= 1974–75 PSV Eindhoven season =

PSV Eindhoven
1974–75 season
- Manager: Kees Rijvers
- Stadium: Philips Stadion
- Eredivisie: 1st
- KNVB Cup: Round of 16
- Cup Winners' Cup: Semi-Finals
- Top goalscorer: League: Willy van der Kuijlen (28); All: Willy van der Kuijlen (37)

During the 1974–75 Dutch football season, PSV Eindhoven competed in the Eredivisie, winning its fifth national title.

== Squad ==
Note: Flags indicate national team as defined under FIFA eligibility rules; some limited exceptions apply. Players may hold more than one non-FIFA nationality.

No.	Pos.	Nation	Player
—	GK	NED	Jan van Beveren
—	GK	NED	André van Gerven
—	DF	NED	Peter Kemper
—	DF	NED	Raymond Korteknie
—	DF	NED	Kees Krijgh
—	DF	NED	Adrie van Kraay
—	DF	NED	Tinie Meulenbroeks
—	DF	SWE	Björn Nordqvist
—	DF	NED	Jan Poortvliet
—	DF	NED	Pleun Strik
—	MF	DEN	Bent Schmidt Hansen
—	MF	NED	René van de Kerkhof

No.	Pos.	Nation	Player
—	MF	NED	Willy van de Kerkhof
—	MF	NED	Willy van der Kuijlen
—	MF	NED	Geo de Leeuw
—	MF	NED	Bertus Quaars
—	FW	SWE	Peter Dahlqvist
—	FW	NED	Gerrie Deijkers
—	FW	SWE	Ralf Edström
—	FW	NED	Harry Lubse
—	FW	NED	Ton van der Palen
—	FW	NED	Paul Postuma

== Results ==
=== Eredivisie ===
1 September 1974 1	MVV Maastricht	1–3	PSV Eindhoven	Maastricht
14:30	Van Broekhoven 25'		Lubse 11', 63'; Van der Kuijlen 80'	Stadium: De Geusselt; Attendance: 15,000; Referee: Frans Derks

8 September 1974 2	PSV Eindhoven	3–2	Feyenoord	Eindhoven
14:30	Edström 17', 34', 69'		De Jong 30', 51'	Stadium: Philips Stadion; Attendance: 20,000; Referee: Charles Corver

14 September 1974 3	Sparta Rotterdam	1–2	PSV Eindhoven	Rotterdam
20:00	Walbeek 2' (pen.)		R. van de Kerkhof 30'; Edström 90+1'	Stadium: Het Kasteel; Attendance: 12,000; Referee: Ben Hoppenbrouwer

22 September 1974 4	PSV Eindhoven	5–1	Go Ahead Eagles	Eindhoven
14:30	Edström 29', 79'; Lubse 54'; Dahlqvist 64', 75'		Van der Leij 61'	Stadium: Philips Stadion; Attendance: 20,000; Referee: Henk Weerink

29 September 1974 5	Excelsior	1–3	PSV Eindhoven	Rotterdam
14:00	Den Butter 80'		Van der Kuijlen 12', 66'; Wickel 28' (o.g.)	Stadium: Van Donge & De Roo Stadion; Attendance: 11,000; Referee: Jan Beck

13 October 1974 6	PSV Eindhoven	6–0	FC Utrecht	Eindhoven
	Van der Kuijlen 36', 49', 56', 63'; W. van de Kerkhof 41'; Edström 89'			Stadium: Philips Stadion; Attendance: 22,000; Referee: Cees de Bruin

20 October 1974 7	NAC	0–4	PSV Eindhoven	Breda
14:30			Van der Kuijlen 11', 50', 63'; W. van de Kerkhof 15'	Stadium: NAC-stadion aan de Beatrixstraat; Attendance: 11,500; Referee: Leo van der Kroft

27 October 1974 8	PSV Eindhoven	3–2	HFC Haarlem	Eindhoven
14:30	Van der Kuijlen 6'; Van Kraay 8'; Edström 64'		Pot 59'; Huijg 75'	Stadium: Philips Stadion; Attendance: 20,000; Referee: Theo Boosten

3 November 1974 9	WVV Wageningen	1–1	PSV Eindhoven	Wageningen
14:30	Groenendijk 65'		Van der Kuijlen 69'	Stadium: Wageningse Berg; Attendance: 12,500; Referee: Jan Keizer

10 November 1974 10	PSV Eindhoven	4–0	AZ '67	Eindhoven
14:30	Van der Kuijlen 15', 43'; Krijgh 39'; Edström 78'			Stadium: Philips Stadion; Attendance: 16,000; Referee: Jan Beck

17 November 1974 11	SC Telstar	2–2	PSV Eindhoven	Velsen
14:30	Bijl 13'; Van Kooten 21'		Van der Kuijlen 27'; W. van de Kerkhof 61'	Stadium: BUKO Stadion; Attendance: 10,000; Referee: Arie van Gemert

1 December 1974 12	PSV Eindhoven	3–0	De Graafschap	Eindhoven
14:30	R. van de Kerkhof 29'; Van der Kuijlen 39', 71'			Stadium: Philips Stadion; Attendance: 19,000; Referee: Joop Vervoort

15 December 1974 14	PSV Eindhoven	1–1	AFC Ajax	Eindhoven
14:30	Krijgh 39'		Mühren 2'	Stadium: Philips Stadion; Attendance: 20,500; Referee: Charles Corver

22 December 1974 15	FC Amsterdam	1–2	PSV Eindhoven	Amsterdam
14:00	Jansen 76'		Edström 2'; R. van de Kerkhof 21'	Stadium: Olympisch Stadion Amsterdam; Attendance: 11,000; Referee: Frans Derks

5 January 1975 16	FC Den Haag	1-1	PSV Eindhoven	The Hague
14:00	Van Leeuwen 65'		R. van de Kerkhof 75'	Stadium: Zuiderparkstadion; Attendance: 17,000; Referee: Jan Beck

12 January 1975 17	PSV Eindhoven	1–1	MVV Maastricht	Eindhoven
14:30	Van der Kuijlen 8'		Kleton 45'	Stadium: Philips Stadion; Attendance: 18,000; Referee: Henk Pijper

19 January 1975 18	Feyenoord	2–3	PSV Eindhoven	Rotterdam
14:00	Kreuz 22'; Schoenmaker 72' (pen.)		W. van de Kerkhof 17'; Van der Kuijlen 40', 56'	Stadium: De Kuip; Attendance: 64,736; Referee: Leo van der Kroft

25 January 1975 19	PSV Eindhoven	1–0	Sparta Rotterdam	Eindhoven
20:00	Lubse 90'			Stadium: Philips Stadion; Attendance: 20,000; Referee: Jan Keizer

28 January 1975 13	FC Twente	2–1	PSV Eindhoven	Twente
19:30	Overweg 2'; Jeuring 56'		Mühren 87' (o.g.)	Stadium: Het Diekman; Attendance: 20,000; Referee: Frans Derks

2 February 1975 20	Go Ahead Eagles	0–0	PSV Eindhoven	Deventer
14:30				Stadium: De Adelaarshorst; Attendance: 12,000; Referee: Siem Wellinga

15 February 1975 21	PSV Eindhoven	7–0	Excelsior	Eindhoven
20:00	Strik 7'; Edström 35'; Van der Kuijlen 46'; R. van de Kerkhof 77'; W. van de Kerkhof 79', 85'; Dahlqvist 88'			Stadium: Philips Stadion; Attendance: 17,000; Referee: Ben Hoppenbrouwer

23 February 1975 22	FC Utrecht	0–0	PSV Eindhoven	Utrecht
14:30				Stadium: Galgenwaard; Attendance: 20,000; Referee: Leo van der Kroft

1 March 1975 23	PSV Eindhoven	1–0	NAC	Eindhoven
20:00	Edström 79'			Stadium: Philips Stadion; Attendance: 19,000; Referee: Henk Pjiper

9 March 1975 24	HFC Haarlem	1–1	PSV Eindhoven	Haarlem
14:30	Huijg 58'		Fransz 90' (o.g.)	Stadium: Haarlem Stadion; Attendance: 6,000; Referee: Charles Corver

15 March 1975 25	PSV Eindhoven	2–0	WVV Wageningen	Eindhoven
20:00	Deijkers 19'; Lubse 57'			Stadium: Philips Stadion; Attendance: 17,000; Referee: Cees de Bruin

23 March 1975 26	AZ '67	2–1	PSV Eindhoven	Alkmaar
14:00	Kist 24', 68'		Van der Kuijlen 87' (pen.)	Stadium: Alkmaarderhout; Attendance: 15,000; Referee: Theo Boosten

29 March 1975 27	PSV Eindhoven	2–0	Roda JC	Eindhoven
20:00	Deijkers 60'; Van der Kuijlen 88'			Stadium: Philips Stadion; Attendance: 20,000; Referee: Leo van der Kroft

31 March 1975 28	Roda JC	0–4	PSV Eindhoven	Kerkrade
14:30			Edström 11', 18'; R. van de Kerkhof 17'; Lubse 62'	Stadium: Kaalheide; Attendance: 20,000; Referee: Jan Keizer

5 April 1975 29	PSV Eindhoven	1–0	SC Telstar	Eindhoven
20:00	Deijkers 11'			Stadium: Philips Stadion; Attendance: 20,000; Referee: Charles Corver

13 April 1975 30	De Graafschap	1–1	PSV Eindhoven	Doetinchem
14:30	De Jonge 40'		Lubse 55'	Stadium: De Vijverberg; Attendance: 12,000

19 April 1975 31	PSV Eindhoven	3–0	FC Twente	Eindhoven
20:00	Quaars 38'; R. van de Kerkhof 86'; Van der Kuijlen 90'			Stadium: Philips Stadion; Attendance: 20,000; Referee: Gerrit Berrevoets

27 April 1975 32	Ajax	2–4	PSV Eindhoven	Amsterdam
14:30	Brokamp 88'; Geels 89'		Edström 8'; R. van de Kerkhof 36'; Van der Kuijlen 39'; Lubse 87'	Stadium: Amsterdam Olympic Stadium; Attendance: 49,000; Referee: Leo van der Kroft

4 May 1975 33	PSV Eindhoven	3–0	FC Amsterdam	Eindhoven
14:30	Edström 16'; Van der Kuijlen 37', 83'			Stadium: Philips Stadion; Attendance: 20,000; Referee: Frans Derks

11 May 1975 34	PSV Eindhoven	3–1	FC Den Haag	Eindhoven
14:30	W. van de Kerkhof 8'; Van der Kuijlen 41'; R. van de Kerkhof 77'		Ouwehand 73'	Stadium: Philips Stadion; Attendance: 20,000; Referee: Jan Keizer

=== KNVB Cup ===
18 September 1974 Second round	RBC Roosendaal	0–4	PSV Eindhoven	De Luiten, Roosendaal
			Edström 16', 57'; Van Hal 40'; Lubse 75'	Attendance: 10,000; Referee: Frans Vermeij

2 February 1975 Round of 16	WVV Wageningen	3–2	PSV Eindhoven	Wageningse Berg, Wageningen
14:30	Blotenberg 28'; Groenendijk 34'; Menting 50'		W. van de Kerkhof 27'; R. van de Kerkhof 67' (pen.)	Attendance: 9,000; Referee: Gerrit Berrevoets

=== UEFA Cup Winners' Cup ===
==== First round ====
18 September 1974 First leg	PSV Eindhoven (Netherlands)	10–0	(Northern Ireland) Ards	Philips Stadion, Eindhoven
20:30	Van der Kuijlen 5', 68', 83'; Lubse 13', 37', 76'; Kemper 26'; Deijkers 28'; Edström 50'; Van Kraay 82'			Attendance: 17,000; Referee: Sven Jonsson (Sweden)

2 October 1974 Second leg	Ards (Northern Ireland)	1–4 (14–1 agg.)	(Netherlands) PSV Eindhoven	Castlereagh Park, Newtownards
17:15	Guy 40'		Van der Kuijlen 6'; Edström 65'; Dahlqvist 77', 86'	Attendance: 1,474; Referee: Kaj Rasmussen (Denmark)

==== Second round ====
23 October 1974 First leg	Gwardia Warszawa (Poland)	1–5	(Netherlands) PSV Eindhoven	Stadion Warszawski Klub Sportowy Gwardia Warszawa, Warsaw
16:30	Malkiewicz 73' (pen.)		Deijkers 15'; Lubse 17'; W. van de Kerkhof 20'; Van der Kuijlen 60'; Kielak 70' (o.g.)	Attendance: 5,000; Referee: Nikos Zlatanos (Greece)

6 November 1974 Second leg	PSV Eindhoven (Netherlands)	3–0 (8–1 agg.)	(Poland) Gwardia Warszawa	Philips Stadion, Eindhoven
20:00	Van der Kuijlen 34', 36'; Lubse 89'			Attendance: 16,000; Referee: Milivoje Gugulović (Yugoslavia)

==== Quarter-finals ====
5 March 1975 First leg	PSV Eindhoven (Netherlands)	0–0	(Portugal) Benfica	Philips Stadion, Eindhoven
20:00				Attendance: 26,000; Referee: Alberto Michelotti (Italy)

19 March 1975 Second leg	S.L. Benfica (Portugal)	1–2 (2–1 agg.)	(Netherlands) PSV Eindhoven	Estádio da Luz, Lisbon
21:45	Coelho 17'		W. van de Kerkhof 11'; Van der Kuijlen 85'	Attendance: 70,000; Referee: John Paterson (Scotland)

==== Semi-finals ====
9 April 1975 First leg	Dynamo Kyiv (Soviet Union)	3–0	(Netherlands) PSV Eindhoven	Central Stadium, Kyiv
19:00	Kolotov 17'; Onyshchenko 31'; Blokhin 56'			Attendance: 100,000; Referee: Pat Partridge (England)

23 April 1975 Second leg	PSV Eindhoven (Netherlands)	2–1 (4–2 agg.)	(Soviet Union) Dynamo Kyiv	Philips Stadion, Eindhoven
20:00	Edström 24', 86'		Buryak 77'	Attendance: 24,000; Referee: Pablo Sánchez Ibáñez (Spain)
