= List of PSV Eindhoven players =

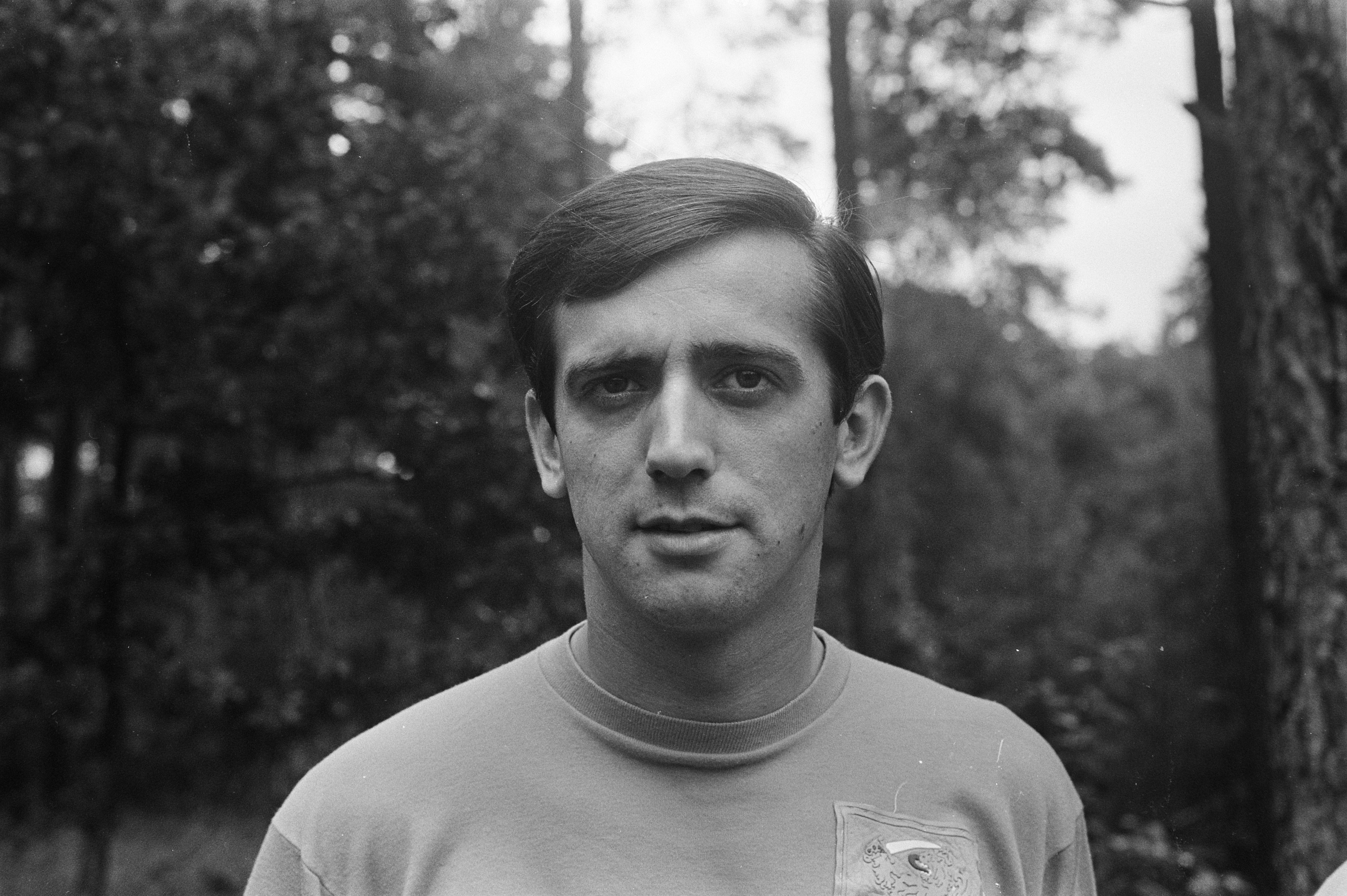
Willy van der Kuijlen holds the records for most league appearances (528) and most league goals (308) for PSV.

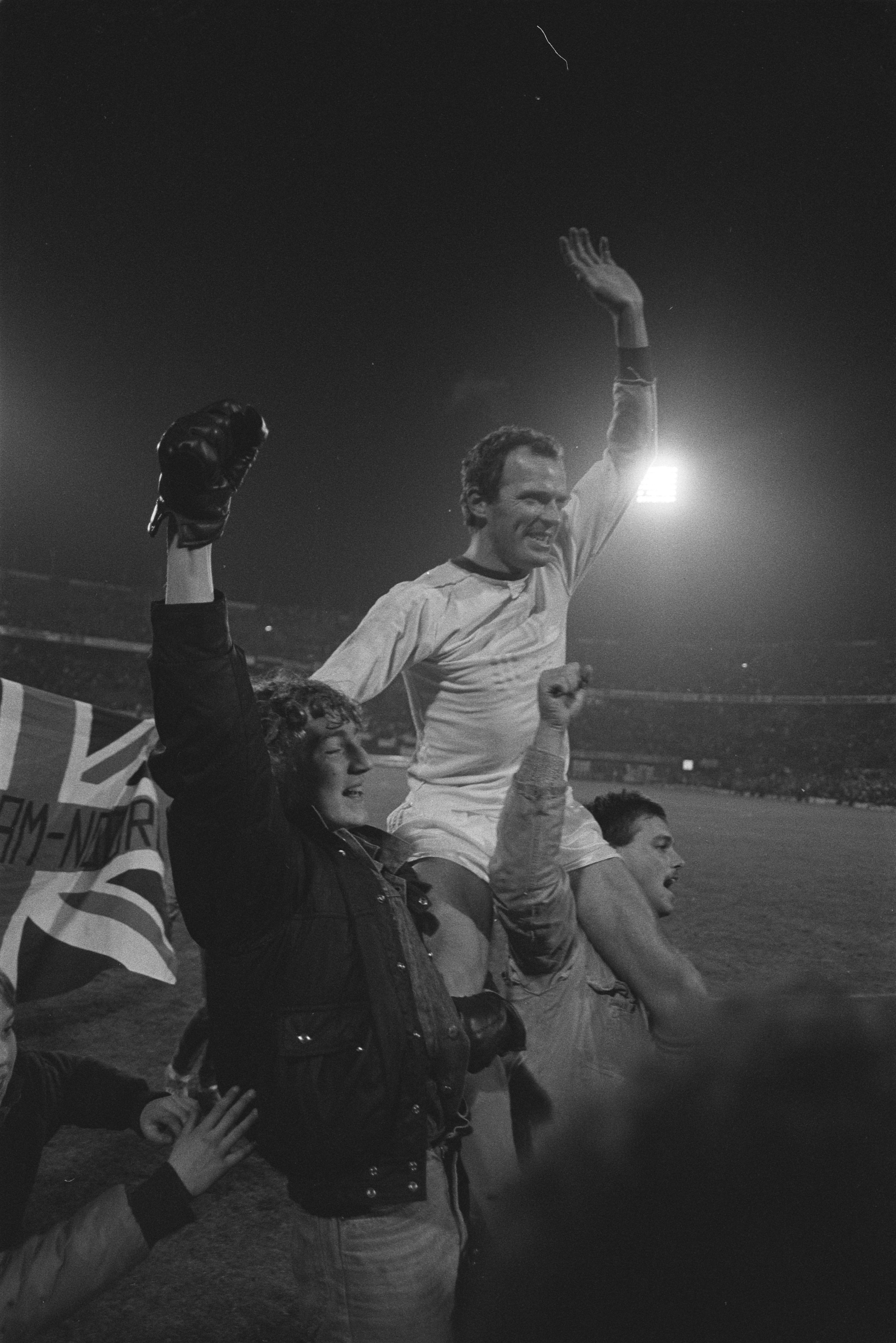
Willy van de Kerkhof played the second-highest number of league matches for PSV (418).

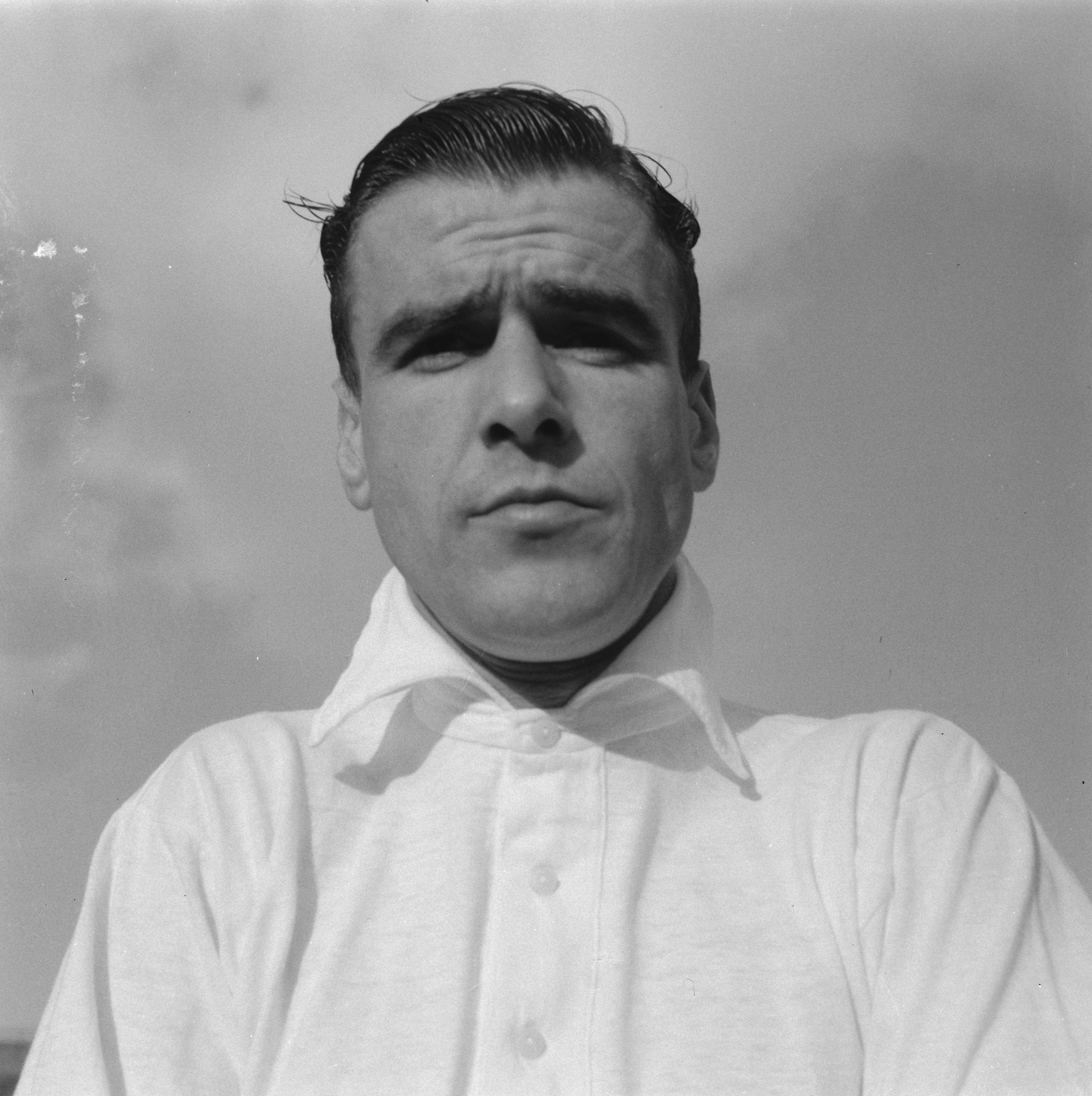
Coen Dillen is the second-highest goal scorer for PSV (288).

Philips Sport Vereniging is a professional football club that is based in Eindhoven, Netherlands, and plays in the Eredivisie. The club was formed in 1913 and started out as a works team for Philips employees. PSV is the second-most successful club in Dutch Football, next to archrivals Ajax, having won 27 Eredivisie titles, 11 KNVB Cups and 15 Supercups. In Europe, PSV won the 1977–78 UEFA Cup and the 1987–88 European Cup. PSV players who have played more than 100 league matches for the club are listed below.

Willy van der Kuijlen currently holds the record for the most league appearances and the most league goals. He played 528 matches and scored 308 goals between 1964 and 1981. Willy van de Kerkhof played the second-highest number of league matches for PSV; he appeared in 418 Eredivisie fixtures. The second-highest goal scorer for PSV is Coen Dillen, with 288 goals.

== List of players ==
- Appearances and goals are for first-team league matches only, including both the Netherlands Football League Championship and Eredivisie.
- Players are listed according to the date of their first team debut for the club.

Statistics correct (but incomplete) as of 1 September 2025.

Table headers

- Nationality – If a player played international football, the country/countries he played for are shown. Otherwise, the player's nationality is given as their country of birth.
- PSV career – The year of the player's first appearance for PSV Eindhoven to the year of his last appearance.
- Appearances* – The number of games played.
- Goals* – The number of goals scored.

*Appearances and goals in the domestic league(s)

Positions key
GK	Goalkeeper
DF	Defender
MF	Midfielder
FW	Forward

- missing some games

Jan Hassink	Netherlands	DF	1925-1927	0	0
Sjef van Run	Netherlands	DF	1926-1942	359	0
Jan van den Broek	Netherlands	FW	1927-1937	200	154
Lieuwe Steiger	Netherlands	GK	1942-1959	33	0
Roel Wiersma	Netherlands	DF	1954-1965	316	2
Milan Nikolić	Serbia	MF	1956-1957	6	0
Trevor Ford	Wales	FW	1957-1960	53	21
Pim Bekkering	Netherlands	GK	1957-1966	121	0
Willy de Hond	Netherlands	GK	1957-1961	13	0
Piet Kruiver	Netherlands	FW	1957-1961	90	36
Dan Ekner	Sweden	FW	1958-1960	23	2
Fons van Wissen	Netherlands	MF	1958-1967	230	25
Piet van der Kuil	Netherlands	FW	1959-1963	115	40
Anders Svensson	Sweden	MF	1959-1963	73	8
Jan Louwers	Netherlands	FW	1960-1963	57	29
Pierre Kerkhoffs	Netherlands	FW	1961-1964	84	55
Gordon Nutt	England	MF	1961-1962	31	5
Peter Kemper	Netherlands	DF	1961-1975	219	6
Miel Pijs	Netherlands	DF	1961-1967	142	15
Gert Bals	Netherlands	GK	1961-1965	123	0
Lambert Maassen	Netherlands	FW	1961-1963	10	2
Piet Giesen	Netherlands	MF	1962-1967	89	19
Anton Allemann	Switzerland	FW	1963-1964	31	6
Lambert Verdonk	Netherlands	FW	1963-1967	94	15
Willy van der Kuijlen	Netherlands	MF/FW	1964-1981	528	308
Daan Schrijvers	Netherlands	DF	1965-1970	134	12
Jack White	Germany	MF	1965-1966	2	1
Ole Sørensen	Denmark		1966-1968	43	9
Zvezdan Čebinac	Serbia	MF	1966-1967	31	5
Pleun Strik	Netherlands	DF	1967-1976	270	8
Pim Doesburg	Netherlands	GK	1967-1970 1980–1987	123	0
Stanley Bish	Netherlands	FW	1967-1969	7	0
Frits Soetekouw	Netherlands	DF	1967-1968	32	0
Bent Schmidt Hansen	Denmark	MF	1967-1975	212	52
Lazar Radović	Montenegro	MF	1968-1972	121	1
Pavle Kiš	Serbia	FW	1968-1969	3	1
Harry Lubse	Netherlands	FW	1968-1980	254	86
Ab Fafié	Netherlands	DF	1968-1970	13	0
Kresten Bjerre	Denmark	DF	1968-1970	53	4
Peter Ressel	Netherlands	MF	1969-1970	27	6
Wietse Veenstra	Netherlands	MF	1969-1971	64	23
Jan van Beveren	Netherlands	GK	1970-1980	292	0
Johan Devrindt	Belgium	FW	1970-1972	58	24
Henning Munk Jensen	Denmark	DF	1970-1973	52	4
Harry Vos	Netherlands	DF	1970-1971	34	0
Adrie van Kraay	Netherlands	DF	1971-1982	309	5
Oeki Hoekema	Netherlands	FW	1971-1973	40	8
Björn Nordqvist	Sweden	DF	1972-1975	101	0
Kees Krijgh	Netherlands	DF	1972-1979	209	7
René van de Kerkhof	Netherlands	FW	1973-1983	278	85
Willy van de Kerkhof	Netherlands	MF	1973-1988	418	57
Ralf Edström	Sweden	FW	1973- 1977	153	81
Jan Poortvliet	Netherlands	DF	1974-1983	264	41
Peter Dahlqvist	Sweden	FW	1974-1977	73	16
Ton van Engelen	Netherlands	GK	1975-1979	20	0
Huub Stevens	Netherlands	DF	1975-1986	293	15
Nick Deacy	Wales	FW	1975-1978	52	8
Willy Janssen	Netherlands	DF	1976-1981	40	3
Toine van Mierlo	Netherlands	MF	1976-1979	18	0
Torbjörn Nilsson	Sweden	FW	1976-1977	11	2
Ernie Brandts	Netherlands	DF	1977-1986	251	23
Rob Landsbergen	Netherlands	FW	1978-1984	68	10
Erwin Koeman	Netherlands	MF	1979-1982 1990–1994	104	14
Piet Wildschut	Netherlands	DF	1979-1985	180	9
Adrie Koster	Netherlands	MF	1979-1983	40	11
Huh Jung-moo	South Korea	MF	1980-1983	77	11
Teddy Maybank	England	FW	1980-1981	6	1
Berry van Aerle	Netherlands	DF/MF	1981-1994	278	12
Hallvar Thoresen	Norway	MF	1981-1988	179	106
Ruud Geels	Netherlands	FW	1981-1982	32	15
Jan Heintze*	Denmark	DF	1982-1994 1999-2003	365	3
Ton Lokhoff	Netherlands	MF	1982-1986	126	19
Arie Haan	Netherlands	MF	1983-1984	18	0
Glenn Hysén	Sweden	DF	1983-1985	48	12
Adick Koot	Netherlands	DF	1983-1991	111	3
Hans van Breukelen	Netherlands	GK	1984-1994	260	0
Peter Corbijn	Netherlands	FW	1984-1985	9	0
Ruud Gullit*	Netherlands	MF FW	1985-1987	68	46
Eric Gerets	Belgium	DF	1985-1992	200	8
Rob McDonald	England	FW/MF	1985-1986	24	15
Frank Arnesen	Denmark	MF	1985-1988	55	11
Randy Samuel	Canada	DF	1985-1987	5	0
Ronald Koeman	Netherlands	DF	1986-1989	98	51
Ivan Nielsen	Denmark	DF	1986-1990	83	5
Gerald Vanenburg	Netherlands	MF	1986-1993	199	48
Hans Gillhaus	Netherlands	FW	1987-1989	67	23
Søren Lerby	Denmark	MF	1987-1990	81	16
Edward Linskens	Netherlands	MF	1987-1995	136	18
Romario	Brazil	FW	1988-1993	107	96
Carlo l'Ami	Netherlands	GK	1988-1989	2	0
Jozef Chovanec	Czech Republic	MF/DF	1988-1991	33	4
Stan Valckx	Netherlands	DF	1988-1992 1994-2000	253	10
Kalusha Bwalya	Zambia	FW/MF	1989-1994	101	25
Flemming Povlsen	Denmark	FW	1989-1990	30	10
Gheorghe Popescu	Romania	DF	1990-1995	120	24
Tom Van Mol	Belgium	DF	1991-1992	39	1
Ernest Faber	Netherlands	DF	1992-1994 1994-2004	228	9
Robert Fuchs	Netherlands	MF	1993-1995 1998-1999	28	1
Nii Lamptey	Ghana	MF	1993-1994	22	10
Klas Ingesson	Sweden	MF	1993-1994	12	1
Eiður Smári Guðjohnsen*	Iceland	FW	1994-1998	13	3
Ronaldo *	Brazil	FW	1994-1996	46	42
Tommy van der Leegte	Netherlands	MF	1994-1996 2007-2008	23	1
Jürgen Dirkx	Netherlands	DF	1994-1995 1998-2001 2002–2003	92	3
Björn van der Doelen	Netherlands	MF	1994-1997 1998-2001	105	6
Luc Nilis	Belgium	FW	1994-2000	204	129
Ronald Waterreus	Netherlands	GK	1994-2004	365	0
Vampeta	Brazil	MF	1994-1997	34	2
Philip Cocu	Netherlands	MF	1995-1998 2004-2007	253	68
Chris van der Weerden	Netherlands	DF	1995-2001	130	5
Dennis Rommedahl	Denmark	MF	1996-1997 1998-2004	215	37
Cláudio	Brazil	FW	1996-1999 2000-2001	19	4
Ovidiu Stîngă	Romania	MF	1996-2001	52	7
Jaap Stam	Netherlands	DF	1996-1998	76	12
Željko Petrović	Montenegro	DF	1996-1997	35	6
Dmitriy Khokhlov	Russia	FW	1997-2000	75	13
Rob Wielaert	Netherlands	DF	1997-2000 2001-2002	14	0
Tomasz Iwan	Poland	MF	1997-2001	79	3
Arnold Bruggink	Netherlands	MF	1997-2003	199	70
André Ooijer	Netherlands	DF	1997-2006 2010-2012	285	27
Gilles De Bilde	Belgium	FW	1997-1999	49	24
Sergei Temryukov	Russia	DF	1997-2000	2	0
Abel Xavier	Portugal	DF	1998-1999	27	2
Giorgi Gakhokidze	Georgia	FW	1998-1999 2000-2003	57	5
Theo Lucius	Netherlands	DF	1998-1999 2000-2006	202	11
Andrius Skerla	Lithuania	DF	1998-2000	27	0
Joonas Kolkka	Finland	FW	1998-2001	103	10
Ruud van Nistelrooy	Netherlands	FW	1998-2001	83	71
Patrick Lodewijks	Netherlands	GK	1998-2002	27	0
Yuriy Nikiforov	Russia	DF	1998-2002	130	5
Mike Franks	Canada	GK	1998-2000	0	0
Godwin Attram	Ghana	FW	1998-1999	0	0
Kasper Bøgelund	Denmark	DF	1999-2005	106	0
Johann Vogel	Switzerland	MF	1999-2005	235	7
Wilfred Bouma	Netherlands	DF	1999-2005 2010-2013	340	30
Eric Addo	Ghana	DF	1999-2009 2004-2009	110	3
Mark van Bommel	Netherlands	MF	1999-2005 2012-2013	267	65
John de Jong	Netherlands	MF	2000-2001 2003-2005	132	25
Adil Ramzi	Morocco	MF	2000-2003	65	9
Kevin Hofland	Netherlands	DF	2000-2004	112	6
Mateja Kežman	Serbia	FW	2000-2004	172	126
Jürgen Colin	Netherlands	DF	2001-2002 2003-2004	38	1
Jan Vennegoor of Hesselink	Netherlands	FW	2001-2006 2011-2012	233	89
Edik Korchagin	Russia	FW	2001-2003	0	0
Vít Valenta	Czech Republic	MF	2001	0	0
Arjen Robben	Netherlands	MF	2002-2004	75	21
Remco van der Schaaf	Netherlands	MF	2002-2005	54	1
Leandro Bonfim	Brazil	MF	2002-2005	23	1
Park Ji-sung	South Korea	MF	2002–2005, 2013-2014	...	...
Otman Bakkal	Netherlands	MF	2003-2004 2007-2011	164	26
Johan Vonlanthen	Switzerland	FW	2003-2005	36	6
Lee Young-pyo	South Korea	DF	2003-2006	117	1
Ibrahim Afellay	Netherlands	MF	2003-2011	217	39
Rob van Dijk	Netherlands	GK	2003-2004	1	0
Csaba Fehér	Hungary	DF	2004-2005 2006-2007	15	0
Edwin Zoetebier	Netherlands	GK	2004-2006	13	0
DaMarcus Beasley	United States	FW	2004-2006	80	16
Gerald Sibon	Netherlands	FW	2004-2006	28	6
Alex	Brazil	DF	2004-2007	123	15
Michael Lamey	Netherlands	DF	2004-2007	50	4
Heurelho Gomes	Brazil	GK	2004-2008	181	0
Jefferson Farfán	Peru	MF	2004-2008	169	67
Robert	Brazil	FW	2005-2006	25	5
Michael Ball	England	DF	2005-2007	15	0
Michael Reiziger	Netherlands	DF	2005-2007	35	1
Roy Beerens	Netherlands	MF	2005-2007	12	1
Arouna Koné	Ivory Coast	FW	2005-2007	72	26
Ismaïl Aissati	Morocco	MF	2005-2007 2007-2008	64	3
Mika Väyrynen	Finland	MF	2005-2008	33	1
Jason Culina	Australia	MF	2005-2009	130	4
Timmy Simons	Belgium	MF	2005-2010	217	21
Xiang Sun	China	MF	2006-2007	10	0
Patrick Kluivert	Netherlands	FW	2006-2007	21	3
Diego Tardelli	Brazil	FW	2006-2007	20	3
Alcides	Brazil	DF	2006-2008	41	1
Manuel da Costa	Portugal	DF	2006-2008	24	1
Genero Zeefuik	Netherlands	FW	2006-2008 2010-2011	18	1
Édison Méndez	Ecuador	MF	2006-2009	105	10
Carlos Salcido	Mexico	DF	2006-2010	168	3
Dirk Marcellis	Netherlands	DF	2006-2010	92	2
Jan Kromkamp	Netherlands	DF	2006-2010	95	2
Slobodan Rajković	Serbia	DF	2007-2008	18	0
Kenneth Perez	Denmark	FW	2007-2008	20	9
Jonathan Reis	Brazil	FW	2007-2008 2009-2011	40	18
Mike Zonneveld	Netherlands	FW	2007-2009	35	3
Danko Lazović	Serbia	FW	2007-2010	114	33
Danny Koevermans	Netherlands	FW	2007-2011	125	44
Jérémie Bréchet	France	DF	2008-2009	33	1
Stijn Wuytens	Belgium	DF	2008-2009 2009-2012	44	3
Stefan Nijland	Netherlands	FW	2008-2009 2010-2011	27	2
Funso Ojo	Belgium	MF	2008-2011 2011-2012	19	0
Francisco Javier Rodríguez	Mexico	DF	2008-2011	88	4
Balázs Dzsudzsák	Hungary	MF	2008-2011	157	54
Nordin Amrabat	Morocco	MF	2008-2011	75	12
Andreas Isaksson	Sweden	GK	2008-2012	174	0
Erik Pieters	Netherlands	DF	2008-2013	140	0
Jagoš Vuković	Serbia	DF	2009-2011	18	1
Zakaria Labyad	Morocco	MF	2009-2012	67	15
Stanislav Manolev	Bulgaria	DF	2009-2013	120	7
Orlando Engelaar	Netherlands	MF	2009-2013	116	10
Ola Toivonen	Sweden	FW	2009-2014	198	79
Zhou Haibin	China	MF	2009	0	0
Marcus Berg	Sweden	FW	2010-2011	41	10
Abel Tamata	Netherlands	DF	2010-2012	18	0
Marcelo	Brazil	DF	2010-2013	139	8
Atiba Hutchinson	Canada	MF	2010-2013	115	4
Jeremain Lens	Netherlands	MF	2010-2013	138	43
Przemysław Tytoń	Poland	GK	2011-2015	...	...
Timothy Derijck	Belgium	DF	2011-2013	62	5
Kevin Strootman	Netherlands	MF	2011-2013	88	14
Marcel Ritzmaier	Austria	MF	2011-2013	11	0
Dries Mertens	Belgium	MF	2011-2013	88	45
Jetro Willems	Netherlands	DF	2011-2017	...	...
Georginio Wijnaldum	Netherlands	MF	2011-2015	...	...
Memphis Depay	Netherlands	FW	2011-2015	...	...
Tim Matavž	Slovenia	FW	2011-2014	...	...
Jürgen Locadia	Netherlands	FW	2011-2018	...	...
Boy Waterman	Netherlands	GK	2012-2013	41	0
Joshua Brenet	Netherlands	DF	2012-2018	...	...
Mathias Jørgensen	Denmark	DF	2012-2014	...	...
Peter van Ooijen	Netherlands	MF	2012-2014	...	...
Luciano Narsingh	Netherlands	MF	2012-2017	...	...
Oscar Hiljemark	Sweden	MF	2013-2015	...	...
Jeroen Zoet	Netherlands	GK	2011-2020	...	...
Santiago Arias	Colombia	DF	2013-2018	136	9
Jeffrey Bruma	Netherlands	DF	2013-2016	...	...
Karim Rekik	Netherlands	DF	2013-2015	...	...
Stijn Schaars	Netherlands	MF	2013-2016	...	...
Adam Maher	Netherlands	MF	2013-2018	...	...
Florian Jozefzoon	Suriname	MF	2013-2017	...	...
Zakaria Bakkali	Belgium	FW	2013-2015	...	...
Bryan Ruiz	Costa Rica	MF	2014-2014	14	5
Andrés Guardado	Mexico	MF	2014-2017	80	4
Héctor Moreno	Mexico	DF	2015-2017	61	11
Hirving Lozano	Mexico	FW	2017-2019 2023-2024	93	44
Érick Gutiérrez	Mexico	MF	2018-2023	94	7

== PSV players participating in international cups ==
Cup	Players
(West Germany) 1974 FIFA World Cup	(Netherlands) René van de Kerkhof (Netherlands) Willy van de Kerkhof (Netherlands) Pleun Strik (Sweden) Ralf Edström (Sweden) Björn Nordqvist
(Socialist Federal Republic of Yugoslavia) UEFA Euro 1976	(Netherlands) René van de Kerkhof (Netherlands) Willy van de Kerkhof (Netherlands) Adrie van Kraay
(Argentina) 1978 FIFA World Cup	(Netherlands) Ernie Brandts (Netherlands) René van de Kerkhof (Netherlands) Willy van de Kerkhof (Netherlands) Adrie van Kraay (Netherlands) Harry Lubse (Netherlands) Jan Poortvliet
(Italy) UEFA Euro 1980	(Netherlands) Ernie Brandts (Netherlands) René van de Kerkhof (Netherlands) Willy van de Kerkhof (Netherlands) Adrie Koster (Netherlands) Jan Poortvliet (Netherlands) Huub Stevens
(Mexico) 1986 FIFA World Cup	(Belgium) Eric Gerets (Denmark) Frank Arnesen
(West Germany) UEFA Euro 1988	(Denmark) Jan Heintze (Denmark) Søren Lerby (Denmark) Ivan Nielsen (Netherlands) Berry van Aerle (Netherlands) Hans van Breukelen (Netherlands) Wim Kieft (Netherlands) Ronald Koeman (Netherlands) Gerald Vanenburg
(Italy) 1990 FIFA World Cup	(Belgium) Eric Gerets (Brazil) Romário (Czechoslovakia) Jozef Chovanec (Netherlands) Berry van Aerle (Netherlands) Hans van Breukelen (Netherlands) Wim Kieft (Netherlands) Gerald Vanenburg
(Senegal) 1992 Africa Cup of Nations	(Zambia) Kalusha Bwalya
(Sweden) UEFA Euro 1992	(Netherlands) Berry van Aerle (Netherlands) Hans van Breukelen (Netherlands) Wim Kieft (Netherlands) Adri van Tiggelen
(Tunisia) 1994 Africa Cup of Nations	(Zambia) Kalusha Bwalya (Ghana) Nii Lamptey
(United States) 1994 FIFA World Cup	(Netherlands) Jan Wouters (Netherlands) Arthur Numan (Romania) Gheorghe Popescu (Sweden) Klas Ingesson
(Uruguay) 1995 Copa América	(Brazil) Ronaldo
(England) UEFA Euro 1996	(Netherlands) Philip Cocu (Netherlands) Arthur Numan (Netherlands) Jaap Stam
(France) 1998 FIFA World Cup	(Belgium) Luc Nilis (Denmark) Peter Møller (Netherlands) Philip Cocu (Netherlands) Wim Jonk (Netherlands) Arthur Numan (Netherlands) André Ooijer (Netherlands) Jaap Stam (Netherlands) Boudewijn Zenden (Romania) Ovidiu Stîngă
(Belgium) (Netherlands) UEFA Euro 2000	(Belgium) Luc Nilis (Denmark) Jan Heintze (Socialist Federal Republic of Yugoslavia) Ivica Kralj
(Mali) 2002 Africa Cup of Nations	(Morocco) Adil Ramzi
(South Korea) (Japan) 2002 FIFA World Cup	(Denmark) Kasper Bøgelund (Denmark) Jan Heintze (Denmark) Dennis Rommedahl (Russia) Yuri Nikiforov
(China) 2004 AFC Asian Cup	(South Korea) Lee Young-pyo (South Korea) Park Ji-sung
(Portugal) UEFA Euro 2004	(Denmark) Kasper Bøgelund (Denmark) Dennis Rommedahl (Netherlands) Wilfred Bouma (Netherlands) Arjen Robben (Netherlands) Ronald Waterreus (Switzerland) Johann Vogel (Switzerland) Johan Vonlanthen
(United States) 2005 CONCACAF Gold Cup	(United States) DaMarcus Beasley
(Egypt) 2006 Africa Cup of Nations	(Ivory Coast) Arouna Koné
(Germany) 2006 FIFA World Cup	(Australia) Jason Culina (Australia) Archie Thompson (Ghana) Eric Addo (Netherlands) Philip Cocu (Netherlands) André Ooijer (Netherlands) Jan Vennegoor of Hesselink (United States) DaMarcus Beasley
(Indonesia) (Malaysia) (Thailand) (Vietnam) 2007 AFC Asian Cup	(Australia) Jason Culina
(United States) 2007 CONCACAF Gold Cup	(United States) DaMarcus Beasley (Mexico) Carlos Salcido
(Venezuela) 2007 Copa América	(Peru) Jefferson Farfán (Ecuador) Édison Méndez (United States) Lee Nguyen (Brazil) Alex
(Ghana) 2008 Africa Cup of Nations	(Ghana) Eric Addo
(Austria) (Switzerland) UEFA Euro 2008	(Netherlands) Ibrahim Afellay
(South Africa) 2010 FIFA World Cup	(Mexico) Francisco Javier Rodríguez (Mexico) Carlos Salcido (Netherlands) Ibrahim Afellay (Netherlands) André Ooijer
(United States) 2011 CONCACAF Gold Cup	(Canada) Atiba Hutchinson (Mexico) Francisco Javier Rodríguez
(Poland) (Ukraine) UEFA Euro 2012	(Netherlands) Wilfred Bouma (Netherlands) Kevin Strootman (Netherlands) Jetro Willems (Poland) Przemysław Tytoń (Sweden) Andreas Isaksson (Sweden) Ola Toivonen
(Brazil) 2014 FIFA World Cup	(Colombia) Santiago Arias (Costa Rica) Bryan Ruiz (Netherlands) Memphis Depay (Netherlands) Georginio Wijnaldum
(Chile) 2015 Copa América	(Colombia) Santiago Arias
(United States) 2015 CONCACAF Gold Cup	(Mexico) Andrés Guardado
(United States) Copa América Centenario	(Colombia) Santiago Arias (Mexico) Andrés Guardado (Mexico) Héctor Moreno
(Russia) 2017 FIFA Confederations Cup	(Mexico) Andrés Guardado (Mexico) Héctor Moreno (Mexico) Hirving Lozano
(Russia) 2018 FIFA World Cup	(Mexico) Hirving Lozano (Colombia) Santiago Arias (Iceland) Albert Guðmundsson
(United Arab Emirates) 2019 AFC Asian Cup	(Australia) Aziz Behich (Australia) Trent Sainsbury
(Portugal) 2019 UEFA Nations League Finals	(Netherlands) Steven Bergwijn (Netherlands) Denzel Dumfries (Netherlands) Luuk de Jong
(Brazil) 2019 Copa América	(Uruguay) Gastón Pereiro
(United States) 2019 CONCACAF Gold Cup	(Mexico) Érick Gutiérrez (Curaçao) Eloy Room
(Europe) UEFA Euro 2020	(Netherlands) Denzel Dumfries (Netherlands) Cody Gakpo (Netherlands) Donyell Malen (Switzerland) Yvon Mvogo
(United States) 2021 CONCACAF Gold Cup	(Mexico) Érick Gutiérrez
(Cameroon) 2021 Africa Cup of Nations	(Ivory Coast) Ibrahim Sangaré
(Qatar) 2022 FIFA World Cup	(Netherlands) Cody Gakpo (Mexico) Érick Gutiérrez (Netherlands) Luuk de Jong (Netherlands) Xavi Simons
(United States) 2024 Copa America	(United States) Ricardo Pepi (United States) Malik Tillman
(United States) 2025 CONCACAF Gold Cup	(United States) Malik Tillman
(Morocco) 2025 Africa Cup of Nations	(Burkina Faso) Adamo Nagalo (Morocco) Ismaël Saibari (Morocco) Anass Salah-Eddine
(Canada) (Mexico) (United States) 2026 FIFA World Cup	(Bosnia and Herzegovina) Esmir Bajraktarević (United States) Sergiño Dest (Czech Republic) Matěj Kovář (Curaçao) Armando Obispo (United States) Ricardo Pepi (Croatia) Ivan Perišić (Morocco) Ismaël Saibari (Morocco) Anass Salah-Eddine (Netherlands) Guus Til (Austria) Paul Wanner
