= 1975–76 European Cup =

European football tournament

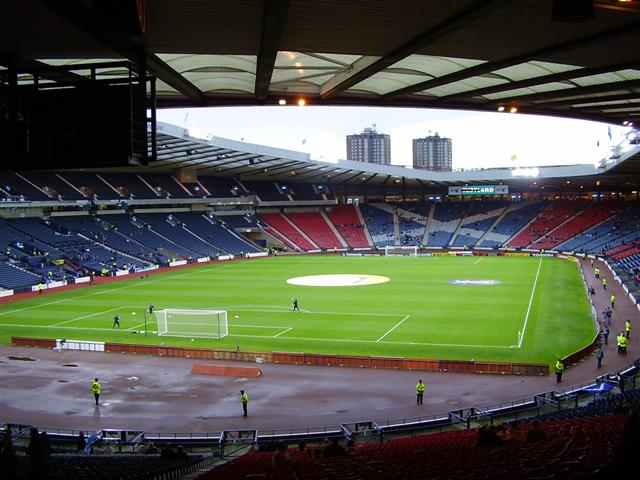
- Hampden Park, Glasgow hosted the final.

Tournament details
- Dates: 17 September 1975 – 12 May 1976
- Teams: 32

Final positions
- Champions: (West Germany) Bayern Munich (3rd title)
- Runners-up: (France) Saint-Étienne

Tournament statistics
- Matches played: 61
- Goals scored: 202 (3.31 per match)
- Attendance: 1,829,242 (29,988 per match)
- Top scorer(s): Jupp Heynckes (Borussia Mönchengladbach); 6 goals

The 1975–76 season of the European Cup football club tournament was won for the third consecutive time by Bayern Munich in the final against Saint-Étienne at Hampden Park, Glasgow. This was the first time that Bayern Munich participated as last year's Cup winners only (Borussia Mönchengladbach won the 1974–75 Bundesliga).

It would be another 42 years before a club again won this tournament in three consecutive seasons, this being achieved by Real Madrid in 2018. Only Real Madrid, Ajax, and Bayern Munich won in three consecutive seasons.

In France, Saint-Étienne's appearance in the final sparked a huge public enthusiasm. In the final, "the Greens" hit the square posts of Glasgow's Hampden Park stadium. Despite their defeat 1–0, they paraded down the Champs Elysées the following day for their great performance.

== Teams ==
(Austria) Wacker (1st)	(Belgium) Molenbeek (1st)	(Bulgaria) CSKA Sofia (1st)	(Cyprus) Omonia (1st)
(Czechoslovakia) Slovan Bratislava (1st)	(Denmark) KB (1st)	(England) Derby County (1st)	(Finland) KuPS (1st)
(France) Saint-Étienne (1st)	(East Germany) Magdeburg (1st)	(West Germany) Borussia Mönchengladbach (1st)	(West Germany) Bayern Munich (10th)^{TH}
(Greece) Olympiacos (1st)	(Hungary) Újpesti Dózsa (1st)	(Iceland) ÍA (1st)	(Republic of Ireland) Bohemians (1st)
(Italy) Juventus (1st)	(Luxembourg) Jeunesse Esch (1st)	(Malta) Floriana (1st)	(Netherlands) PSV Eindhoven (1st)
(Northern Ireland) Linfield (1st)	(Norway) Viking (1st)	(Poland) Ruch Chorzów (1st)	(Portugal) Benfica (1st)
(Romania) Dinamo București (1st)	(Scotland) Rangers (1st)	(Spain) Real Madrid (1st)	(Sweden) Malmö FF (1st)
(Switzerland) Zürich (1st)	(Turkey) Fenerbahçe (1st)	(Soviet Union) Dynamo Kyiv (1st)	(Socialist Federal Republic of Yugoslavia) Hajduk Split (1st)

== Bracket ==
First round
(West Germany) B. M'gladbach	1	6	7
(Austria) Wacker	1	1	2
(Bulgaria) CSKA Sofia	2	0	2
(Italy) Juventus	1	2	3
(Czechoslovakia) Slovan Bratislava	1	0	1
(England) Derby County	0	3	3
(Spain) Real Madrid	4	0	4
(Romania) Dinamo București	1	1	2
(Portugal) Benfica	7	0	7
(Turkey) Fenerbahçe	0	1	1
(Hungary) Újpesti Dózsa (a)	4	1	5
(Switzerland) Zürich	0	5	5
(Sweden) Malmö FF (p)	2	1	3 (2)
(East Germany) Magdeburg	1	2	3 (1)
(Luxembourg) Jeunesse Esch	0	1	1
(West Germany) Bayern Munich	5	3	8
(Greece) Olympiacos	2	0	2
(Soviet Union) Dynamo Kyiv	2	1	3
(Cyprus) Omonia	2	0	2
(Iceland) ÍA	1	4	5
(Denmark) KB	0	1	1
(France) Saint-Étienne	2	3	5
(Scotland) Rangers	4	1	5
(Republic of Ireland) Bohemians	1	1	2
(Malta) Floriana	0	0	0
(Socialist Federal Republic of Yugoslavia) Hajduk Split	5	3	8
(Belgium) Molenbeek	3	1	4
(Norway) Viking	2	0	2
(Poland) Ruch Chorzów	5	2	7
(Finland) KuPS	0	2	2
(Northern Ireland) Linfield	1	0	1
(Netherlands) PSV Eindhoven	2	8	10

Second round
(West Germany) B. M'gladbach	2	2	4
(Italy) Juventus	0	2	2
(England) Derby County	4	1	5
(Spain) Real Madrid	1	5	6
(Portugal) Benfica	5	1	6
(Hungary) Újpesti Dózsa	2	3	5
(Sweden) Malmö FF	1	0	1
(West Germany) Bayern Munich	0	2	2
(Soviet Union) Dynamo Kyiv	3	2	5
(Iceland) ÍA	0	0	0
(France) Saint-Étienne	2	2	4
(Scotland) Rangers	0	1	1
(Socialist Federal Republic of Yugoslavia) Hajduk Split	4	3	7
(Belgium) Molenbeek	0	2	2
(Poland) Ruch Chorzów	1	0	1
(Netherlands) PSV Eindhoven	3	4	7

Quarter-finals
(West Germany) B. M'gladbach	2	1	3
(Spain) Real Madrid (a)	2	1	3
(Portugal) Benfica	0	1	1
(West Germany) Bayern Munich	0	5	5
(Soviet Union) Dynamo Kyiv	2	0	2
(France) Saint-Étienne	0	3	3
(Socialist Federal Republic of Yugoslavia) Hajduk Split	2	0	2
(Netherlands) PSV Eindhoven	0	3	3

Semi-finals
(Spain) Real Madrid	1	0	1
(West Germany) Bayern Munich	1	2	3
(France) Saint-Étienne	1	0	1
(Netherlands) PSV Eindhoven	0	0	0

Finals
(West Germany) Bayern Munich	1
(France) Saint-Étienne	0

== First round ==
Team 1	Agg.	Team 2	1st leg	2nd leg
Borussia Mönchengladbach (West Germany)	7–2	(Austria) Wacker	1–1	6–1
CSKA Sofia (Bulgaria)	2–3	(Italy) Juventus	2–1	0–2
Slovan Bratislava (Czechoslovakia)	1–3	(England) Derby County	1–0	0–3
Real Madrid (Spain)	4–2	(Romania) Dinamo București	4–1	0–1
Benfica (Portugal)	7–1	(Turkey) Fenerbahçe	7–0	0–1
Újpesti Dózsa (Hungary)	5–5 (a)	(Switzerland) Zürich	4–0	1–5
Malmö FF (Sweden)	3–3 (2–1 p)	(East Germany) Magdeburg	2–1	1–2
Jeunesse Esch (Luxembourg)	1–8	(West Germany) Bayern Munich	0–5	1–3
Olympiacos (Greece)	2–3	(Soviet Union) Dynamo Kyiv	2–2	0–1
Omonia (Cyprus)	2–5	(Iceland) ÍA	2–1	0–4
KB (Denmark)	1–5	(France) Saint-Étienne	0–2	1–3
Rangers (Scotland)	5–2	(Republic of Ireland) Bohemians	4–1	1–1
Floriana (Malta)	0–8	(Socialist Federal Republic of Yugoslavia) Hajduk Split	0–5	0–3
Molenbeek (Belgium)	4–2	(Norway) Viking	3–2	1–0
Ruch Chorzów (Poland)	7–2	(Finland) KuPS	5–0	2–2
Linfield (Northern Ireland)	1–10	(Netherlands) PSV Eindhoven	1–2	0–8

=== First leg ===
17 September 1975

Borussia Mönchengladbach (West Germany)	1–1	(Austria) Wacker
Simonsen 83' (pen.)	Report	Welzl 42'

Bökelbergstadion, Mönchengladbach
Attendance: 18,636
Referee: Ken Burns (England)

17 September 1975

CSKA Sofia (Bulgaria)	2–1	(Italy) Juventus
Denev 80'; Marashliev 89'	Report	Anastasi 39'

Natsionalen Stadion Vasil Levski, Sofia
Attendance: 25,693
Referee: Francis Rion (Belgium)

17 September 1975

Slovan Bratislava (Czechoslovakia)	1–0	(England) Derby County
Masný 58'	Report

Tehelné pole, Bratislava
Attendance: 45,000
Referee: Klaus Ohmsen (West Germany)

17 September 1975

Real Madrid (Spain)	4–1	(Romania) Dinamo București
Santillana 8', 90'; Martínez 63'; Netzer 74'	Report	Lucescu 75'

Santiago Bernabéu, Madrid
Attendance: 20,341
Referee: Milivoje Gugulović (Yugoslavia)

17 September 1975

Benfica (Portugal)	7–0	(Turkey) Fenerbahçe
Shéu 22'; Nené 33', 43', 72'; Jordão 60', 75', 84'	Report

Estadio da Luz, Lisbon
Attendance: 18,155
Referee: Robert Héliès (France)

17 September 1975

Újpesti Dózsa (Hungary)	4–0	(Switzerland) Zürich
Fazekas 10'; Dunai 12'; Tóth 56' (pen.); Kellner 78'	Report

Megyeri úti Stadion, Ujpest
Attendance: 7,691
Referee: Doğan Babacan (Turkey)

17 September 1975

Malmö FF (Sweden)	2–1	(East Germany) Magdeburg
Cervin 15'; Larsson 56' (pen.)	Report	Hoffmann 50'

Malmö Stadion, Malmö
Attendance: 11,683
Referee: Marian Srodecki (Poland)

17 September 1975

Jeunesse Esch (Luxembourg)	0–5	(West Germany) Bayern Munich
	Report	Zobel 29', 35'; Schuster 63'; Rummenigge 69', 78'

Stade de la Frontière, Esch-sur-Alzette
Attendance: 15,739
Referee: Alexis Ponnet (Belgium)

17 September 1975

Olympiacos (Greece)	2–2	(Soviet Union) Dynamo Kyiv
Kritikopoulos 35'; Aidiniou 63'	Report	Kolotov 27'; Buryak 30'

Toumba Stadium, Thessaloniki (Note: Olympiacos played their home match at Toumba Stadium, Thessaloniki, as their regular stadium Karaiskakis Stadium, Piraeus, was disqualified because of fan riots)
Attendance: 35,513
Referee: Walter Eschweiler (West Germany)

21 September 1975

Omonia (Cyprus)	2–1	(Iceland) ÍA
Dimitriou 49'; Mavris 57'	Report	Alfredsson 42'

GSP Stadium, Nicosia
Attendance: 5,717
Referee: Petar Nikolov (Bulgaria)

17 September 1975

KB (Denmark)	0–2	(France) Saint-Étienne
	Report	P. Revelli 53'; Larqué 73'

Idrætsparken, Copenhagen
Attendance: 7,463
Referee: Anders Mattsson (Finland)

17 September 1975

Rangers (Scotland)	4–1	(Republic of Ireland) Bohemians
Fyfe 19'; Burke 38' (o.g.); O'Hara 50'; Johnstone 63'	Report	Flanagan 35'

Ibrox Stadium, Glasgow
Attendance: 23,532
Referee: Magnús Pétursson (Iceland)

17 September 1975

Floriana (Malta)	0–5	(Socialist Federal Republic of Yugoslavia) Hajduk Split
	Report	Žungul 15', 61', 78'; Buljan 50'; Šurjak 53'

Empire Stadium, Gżira
Attendance: 4,413
Referee: Gianfranco Menegali (Italy)

17 September 1975

Molenbeek (Belgium)	3–2	(Norway) Viking
Boskamp 36'; Teugels 55'; Wellens 68'	Report	Johannessen 23'; Kvia 89'

Edmond Machtensstadion, Molenbeek-Saint-Jean
Attendance: 9,720
Referee: Pedro Urrestarazu Elordi (Spain)

17 September 1975

Ruch Chorzów (Poland)	5–0	(Finland) KuPS
Marx 6', 59'; Bula 12' (pen.); Benigier 27'; Kopicera 68'	Report

Stadion Miejski, Chorzów
Attendance: 6,961
Referee: Erik Axelryd (Sweden)

17 September 1975

Linfield (Northern Ireland)	1–2	(Netherlands) PSV Eindhoven
Malone 35'	Report	R. van de Kerkhof 3'; Edström 15'

Windsor Park, Belfast
Attendance: 5,388
Referee: William Gow (Wales)

=== Second leg ===
1 October 1975

Wacker (Austria)	1–6	(West Germany) Borussia Mönchengladbach
Flindt Bjerg 23'	Report	Stielike 44'; Simonsen 63'; Heynckes 64', 68', 75', 88'

Tivoli, Innsbruck
Attendance: 18,384
Referee: René Mathieu (Switzerland)

Borussia Mönchengladbach won 7–2 on aggregate.

1 October 1975

Juventus (Italy)	2–0	(Bulgaria) CSKA Sofia
Anastasi 39'; Furino 51'	Report

Stadio Comunale, Turin
Attendance: 54,713
Referee: Bobby Davidson (Scotland)

Juventus won 3–2 on aggregate.

1 October 1975

Derby County (England)	3–0	(Czechoslovakia) Slovan Bratislava
Bourne 45'; Lee 78', 82'	Report

Baseball Ground, Derby
Attendance: 30,888
Referee: Leonardus van der Kroft (Netherlands)

Derby County won 3–1 on aggregate.

1 October 1975

Dinamo București (Romania)	1–0	(Spain) Real Madrid
Sătmăreanu 33'	Report

Stadionul 23 August, Bucharest
Attendance: 50,000
Referee: Giulio Ciacci (Italy)

Real Madrid won 4–2 on aggregate.

1 October 1975

Fenerbahçe (Turkey)	1–0	(Portugal) Benfica
Verel 75'	Report

Alsancak Stadyumu, İzmir
Attendance: 20,027
Referee: Sándor Petri (Hungary)

Benfica won 7–1 on aggregate.

1 October 1975

Zürich (Switzerland)	5–1	(Hungary) Újpesti Dózsa
Katić 2'; Risi 23', 38', 83'; Kühn 45'	Report	Nagy 57'

Letzigrund, Zurich
Attendance: 4,585
Referee: Adolf Prokop (East Germany)

5–5 on aggregate; Újpesti Dózsa won on away goals.

1 October 1975

Magdeburg (East Germany)	2–1 (a.e.t.)	(Sweden) Malmö FF
Hoffmann 30'; Streich 81'	Report	Andersson 65'
Penalties
Streich (penalty missed); Hoffmann (penalty missed); Steinbach (penalty scored); Decker (penalty missed); Zapf (penalty missed)	1–2	(penalty missed) Larsson; (penalty missed) Tapper; (penalty scored) Ljungberg; (penalty scored) R. Andersson

Ernst-Grube-Stadion, Magdeburg
Attendance: 32,769
Referee: Charles Corver (Netherlands)

3–3 on aggregate; Malmö FF won on penalties.

1 October 1975

Bayern Munich (West Germany)	3–1	(Luxembourg) Jeunesse Esch
Schuster 30', 83', 88'	Report	Zwally 86'

Olympiastadion, Munich
Attendance: 8,000
Referee: Zdeněk Jelínek (Czechoslovakia)

Bayern Munich won 8–1 on aggregate.

1 October 1975
19:00

Dynamo Kyiv (Soviet Union)	1–0	(Greece) Olympiacos
Onyshchenko 66'	Report

Central Stadium, Kyiv
Attendance: 67,734
Referee: Adolf Mathias (Austria)

Dynamo Kyiv won 3–2 on aggregate.

28 September 1975

ÍA (Iceland)	4–0	(Cyprus) Omonia
Hallgrímsson 16', 61'; T. Thordarson 50'; K. Þórðarson 79'	Report

Laugardalsvöllur, Reykjavík
Attendance: 5,573
Referee: Thomas Reynolds (Wales)

ÍA won 5–2 on aggregate.

1 October 1975

Saint-Étienne (France)	3–1	(Denmark) KB
Rocheteau 7'; P. Revelli 33'; Larqué 86'	Report	Petersen 49'

Stade Geoffroy Guichard, Saint-Étienne
Attendance: 17,051
Referee: Pablo Sánchez Ibáñez (Spain)

Saint-Étienne won 5–1 on aggregate.

1 October 1975

Bohemians (Republic of Ireland)	1–1	(Scotland) Rangers
O'Connor 56'	Report	Johnstone 37'

Dalymount Park, Dublin
Attendance: 4,189
Referee: Bent Nielsen (Denmark)

Rangers won 5–2 on aggregate.

1 October 1975

Hajduk Split (Socialist Federal Republic of Yugoslavia)	3–0	(Malta) Floriana
Buljan 26'; Šalov 72'; Đorđević 86'	Report

Stari plac, Split
Attendance: 6,159
Referee: Andreas Kouniaides (Cyprus)

Hajduk Split won 8–0 on aggregate.

1 October 1975

Viking (Norway)	0–1	(Belgium) Molenbeek
	Report	Nielsen 48'

Stavanger Stadion, Stavanger
Attendance: 10,636
Referee: Henning Lund-Sørensen (Denmark)

Molenbeek won 4–2 on aggregate.

1 October 1975

KuPS (Finland)	2–2	(Poland) Ruch Chorzów
Törnroos 56'; Heiskanen 61'	Report	Chojnacki 12'; Faber 75'

Mikkelin Urheilupuisto, Mikkeli
Attendance: 1,829
Referee: Rolf Haugen (Norway)

Ruch Chorzów won 7–2 on aggregate.

1 October 1975

PSV Eindhoven (Netherlands)	8–0	(Northern Ireland) Linfield
Lubse 12', 30'; Dahlqvist 36'; W. van de Kerkhof 39'; Van der Kuijlen 41'; Edström 39'; Deacy 70', 83'	Report

Philips Stadion, Eindhoven
Attendance: 12,000
Referee: Jacques Colling (Luxembourg)

PSV Eindhoven won 10–1 on aggregate.

== Second round ==
Team 1	Agg.	Team 2	1st leg	2nd leg
Borussia Mönchengladbach (West Germany)	4–2	(Italy) Juventus	2–0	2–2
Derby County (England)	5–6	(Spain) Real Madrid	4–1	1–5
Benfica (Portugal)	6–5	(Hungary) Újpesti Dózsa	5–2	1–3
Malmö FF (Sweden)	1–2	(West Germany) Bayern Munich	1–0	0–2
Dynamo Kyiv (Soviet Union)	5–0	(Iceland) ÍA	3–0	2–0
Saint-Étienne (France)	4–1	(Scotland) Rangers	2–0	2–1
Hajduk Split (Socialist Federal Republic of Yugoslavia)	7–2	(Belgium) Molenbeek	4–0	3–2
Ruch Chorzów (Poland)	1–7	(Netherlands) PSV Eindhoven	1–3	0–4

=== First leg ===
22 October 1975

Borussia Mönchengladbach (West Germany)	2–0	(Italy) Juventus
Heynckes 27'; Simonsen 36'	Report

Rheinstadion, Düsseldorf
Attendance: 57,195
Referee: Robert Wurtz (France)

22 October 1975

Derby County (England)	4–1	(Spain) Real Madrid
George 9', 15' (pen.), 78' (pen.); Nish 42'	Report	Pirri 25'

Baseball Ground, Derby
Attendance: 34,839
Referee: Anatoliy Ivanov (Soviet Union)

22 October 1975

Benfica (Portugal)	5–2	(Hungary) Újpesti Dózsa
Shéu 16', 37'; Vítor Baptista 31', 89'; Toni 75'	Report	Dunai 20'; Fazekas 61'

Estádio da Luz, Lisbon
Attendance: 31,525
Referee: Clive Thomas (Wales)

22 October 1975

Malmö FF (Sweden)	1–0	(West Germany) Bayern Munich
Andersson 27'	Report

Malmö Stadion, Malmö
Attendance: 23,169
Referee: Vladimir Rudnev (Soviet Union)

22 October 1975
19:00

Dynamo Kyiv (Soviet Union)	3–0	(Iceland) ÍA
Buryak 27', 58'; Onischenko 31'	Report

Central Stadium, Kyiv
Attendance: 32,379
Referee: Marijan Rauš (Yugoslavia)

22 October 1975

Saint-Étienne (France)	2–0	(Scotland) Rangers
P. Revelli 28'; Bathenay 89'	Report

Stade Geoffroy Guichard, Saint-Étienne
Attendance: 28,394
Referee: Leo van der Kroft (Netherlands)

22 October 1975

Hajduk Split (Socialist Federal Republic of Yugoslavia)	4–0	(Belgium) Molenbeek
Žungul 23'; Rožić 30'; Šurjak 40'; Mijač 73'	Report

Stari plac, Split
Attendance: 22,224
Referee: Hilmi Ok (Turkey)

22 October 1975

Ruch Chorzów (Poland)	1–3	(Netherlands) PSV Eindhoven
Bula 10'	Report	Lubse 55'; Edström 67'; R. van de Kerkhof 74'

Stadion Miejski w Chorzowie, Chorzów
Attendance: 7,314
Referee: Walter Eschweiler (West Germany)

=== Second leg ===
5 November 1975

Juventus (Italy)	2–2	(West Germany) Borussia Mönchengladbach
Gori 35'; Bettega 68'	Report	Danner 71'; Simonsen 87'

Stadio Comunale, Turin
Attendance: 62,773
Referee: Erich Linemayr (Austria)

Borussia Mönchengladbach won 4–2 on aggregate.

5 November 1975

Real Madrid (Spain)	5–1 (a.e.t.)	(England) Derby County
Martínez 3', 51'; Santillana 55', 99'; Pirri 83' (pen.)	Report	George 62'

Santiago Bernabéu Stadium, Madrid
Attendance: 95,149
Referee: Walter Hungerbühler (Switzerland)

Real Madrid won 6–5 on aggregate.

5 November 1975

Újpesti Dózsa (Hungary)	3–1	(Portugal) Benfica
Bene 3', 54'; Nagy 65'	Report	Nené 73'

Megyeri úti Stadion, Budapest
Attendance: 8,346
Referee: Riccardo Lattanzi (Italy)

Benfica won 6–5 on aggregate.

5 November 1975

Bayern Munich (West Germany)	2–0	(Sweden) Malmö FF
Dürnberger 59' (pen.); Torstensson 77'	Report

Olympiastadion, Munich
Attendance: 47,000
Referee: Tsvetan Stanev (Bulgaria)

Bayern Munich won 2–1 on aggregate.

5 November 1975
20:00

ÍA (Iceland)	0–2	(Soviet Union) Dynamo Kyiv
	Report	Onischenko 5'; Gunnlaugsson 65' (o.g.)

Melavöllur, Reykjavík
Attendance: 4,091
Referee: Malcolm Wright (Northern Ireland)

Dynamo Kyiv won 5–0 on aggregate.

5 November 1975

Rangers (Scotland)	1–2	(France) Saint-Étienne
MacDonald 88'	Report	Rocheteau 63'; H. Revelli 70'

Ibrox Stadium, Glasgow
Attendance: 54,571
Referee: Francis Rion (Belgium)

Saint-Étienne won 4–1 on aggregate.

5 November 1975

Molenbeek (Belgium)	2–3	(Socialist Federal Republic of Yugoslavia) Hajduk Split
Teugels 29'; Nielsen 79' (pen.)	Report	Šurjak 69'; Žungul 76'; Jovanić 85'

Edmond Machtensstadion, Molenbeek-Saint-Jean
Attendance: 4,586
Referee: Bob Matthewson (England)

Hajduk Split won 7–2 on aggregate.

5 November 1975

PSV Eindhoven (Netherlands)	4–0	(Poland) Ruch Chorzów
W. van de Kerkhof 11'; Van der Kuijlen 22' 27'; Lubse 68'	Report

Philips Stadion, Eindhoven
Attendance: 15,500
Referee: Bobby Davidson (Scotland)

PSV Eindhoven won 7–1 on aggregate.

== Quarter-finals ==
Team 1	Agg.	Team 2	1st leg	2nd leg
Borussia Mönchengladbach (West Germany)	3–3 (a)	(Spain) Real Madrid	2–2	1–1
Benfica (Portugal)	1–5	(West Germany) Bayern Munich	0–0	1–5
Dynamo Kyiv (Soviet Union)	2–3	(France) Saint-Étienne	2–0	0–3
Hajduk Split (Socialist Federal Republic of Yugoslavia)	2–3	(Netherlands) PSV Eindhoven	2–0	0–3

=== First leg ===
3 March 1976

Benfica (Portugal)	0–0	(West Germany) Bayern Munich
	Report

Estádio da Luz, Lisbon
Attendance: 70,000
Referee: John Gordon (Scotland)

3 March 1976

Borussia Mönchengladbach (West Germany)	2–2	(Spain) Real Madrid
Jensen 2'; Wittkamp 27'	Report	Martínez 45'; Pirri 61'

Rheinstadion, Düsseldorf
Attendance: 67,069
Referee: Francis Rion (Belgium)

3 March 1976
19:00

Dynamo Kyiv (Soviet Union)	2–0	(France) Saint-Étienne
Kon'kov 21'; Blokhin 54'	Report

Lokomotiv Stadium, Simferopol (Note: Dynamo Kyiv played their home match at Lokomotiv Stadium, Simferopol, instead of their regular stadium Central Stadium, Kyiv, due to weather conditions.)
Attendance: 26,185
Referee: Clive Thomas (Wales)

3 March 1976

Hajduk Split (Socialist Federal Republic of Yugoslavia)	2–0	(Netherlands) PSV Eindhoven
Mijač 8'; Šurjak 31'	Report

Stari plac, Split
Attendance: 23,203
Referee: Pablo Sánchez Ibáñez (Spain)

=== Second leg ===
17 March 1976

Bayern Munich (West Germany)	5–1	(Portugal) Benfica
Dürnberger 50', 55'; Rummenigge 68'; Müller 73', 83'	Report	António Barros 70'

Olympiastadion, Munich
Attendance: 74,500
Referee: Hilmi Ok (Turkey)

Bayern Munich won 5–1 on aggregate.

17 March 1976

Real Madrid (Spain)	1–1	(West Germany) Borussia Mönchengladbach
Santillana 51'	Report	Heynckes 25'

Santiago Bernabéu Stadium, Madrid
Attendance: 85,956
Referee: Leonardus van der Kroft (Netherlands)

3–3 on aggregate; Real Madrid won on away goals.

17 March 1976
20:30

Saint-Étienne (France)	3–0 (a.e.t.)	(Soviet Union) Dynamo Kyiv
H. Revelli 65'; Larqué 73'; Rocheteau 113'	Report

Stade Geoffroy Guichard, Saint-Étienne
Attendance: 37,737
Referee: Sergio Gonella (Italy)

Saint-Étienne won 3–2 on aggregate.

17 March 1976

PSV Eindhoven (Netherlands)	3–0 (a.e.t.)	(Socialist Federal Republic of Yugoslavia) Hajduk Split
Dahlqvist 62'; Lubse 66'; Van der Kuijlen 108'	Report

Philips Stadion, Eindhoven
Attendance: 16,815
Referee: Erich Linemayr (Austria)

PSV Eindhoven won 3–2 on aggregate.

== Semi-finals ==
Team 1	Agg.	Team 2	1st leg	2nd leg
Real Madrid (Spain)	1–3	(West Germany) Bayern Munich	1–1	0–2
Saint-Étienne (France)	1–0	(Netherlands) PSV Eindhoven	1–0	0–0

=== First leg ===
31 March 1976

Real Madrid (Spain)	1–1	(West Germany) Bayern Munich
Martínez 7'	Report	Müller 42'

Santiago Bernabéu Stadium, Madrid
Attendance: 111,000
Referee: Erich Linemayr (Austria)

31 March 1976

Saint-Étienne (France)	1–0	(Netherlands) PSV Eindhoven
Larqué 17'	Report

Stade Geoffroy Guichard, Saint-Étienne
Attendance: 38,676
Referee: Alfred Delcourt (Belgium)

=== Second leg ===
14 April 1976

Bayern Munich (West Germany)	2–0	(Spain) Real Madrid
Müller 9', 31'	Report

Olympiastadion, Munich
Attendance: 78,000
Referee: Clive Thomas (Wales)

Bayern Munich won 3–1 on aggregate.

14 April 1976

PSV Eindhoven (Netherlands)	0–0	(France) Saint-Étienne
	Report

Philips Stadion, Eindhoven
Attendance: 19,000
Referee: Jack Taylor (England)

Saint-Étienne won 1–0 on aggregate.

== Final ==
12 May 1976

Bayern Munich (West Germany)	1–0	(France) Saint-Étienne
Roth 57'	Report

Hampden Park, Glasgow
Attendance: 54,864
Referee: Károly Palotai (Hungary)

== Top scorers ==
The top scorers from the 1975–76 European Cup are as follows:

Rank	Name	Team	Goals
1	(West Germany) Jupp Heynckes	(West Germany) Borussia Mönchengladbach	6
2	(Netherlands) Harry Lubse	(Netherlands) PSV Eindhoven	5
2	(Spain) Roberto Martínez	(Spain) Real Madrid	5
2	(West Germany) Gerd Müller	(West Germany) Bayern Munich	5
2	(Portugal) Nené	(Portugal) Benfica	5
2	(Spain) Santillana	(Spain) Real Madrid	5
2	(Socialist Federal Republic of Yugoslavia) Slaviša Žungul	(Socialist Federal Republic of Yugoslavia) Hajduk Split	5
8	(England) Charlie George	(England) Derby County	4
8	(Netherlands) Willy van der Kuijlen	(Netherlands) PSV Eindhoven	4
8	(France) Jean-Michel Larqué	(France) Saint-Étienne	4
8	(West Germany) Ludwig Schuster	(West Germany) Bayern Munich	4
8	(Denmark) Allan Simonsen	(West Germany) Borussia Mönchengladbach	4
8	(Socialist Federal Republic of Yugoslavia) Ivica Šurjak	(Socialist Federal Republic of Yugoslavia) Hajduk Split	4
