= Jan Groenendijk =

Jan Groenendijk may refer to:

- Jan Groenendijk (footballer)
- Jan Groenendijk (draughts player)
