= De Luiten =

Multi-use stadium in Roosendaal, Netherlands

Opened in 1949, Sportpark De Luiten was a multi-use stadium in Roosendaal, Netherlands. It was used mostly for football matches and hosted the home matches of RBC Roosendaal. The stadium was able to hold 6,800 people. It was closed and demolished in 2000 when Rosada Stadion opened.

== Sources ==
- Reurink, Ferry (2007): Het Stadioncomplex. Alle terreinen in Nederland waar betaald voetbal is gespeeld. Amsterdam: De Arbeiderspers
