= Piet Huijg =

Dutch footballer (1951–2019)

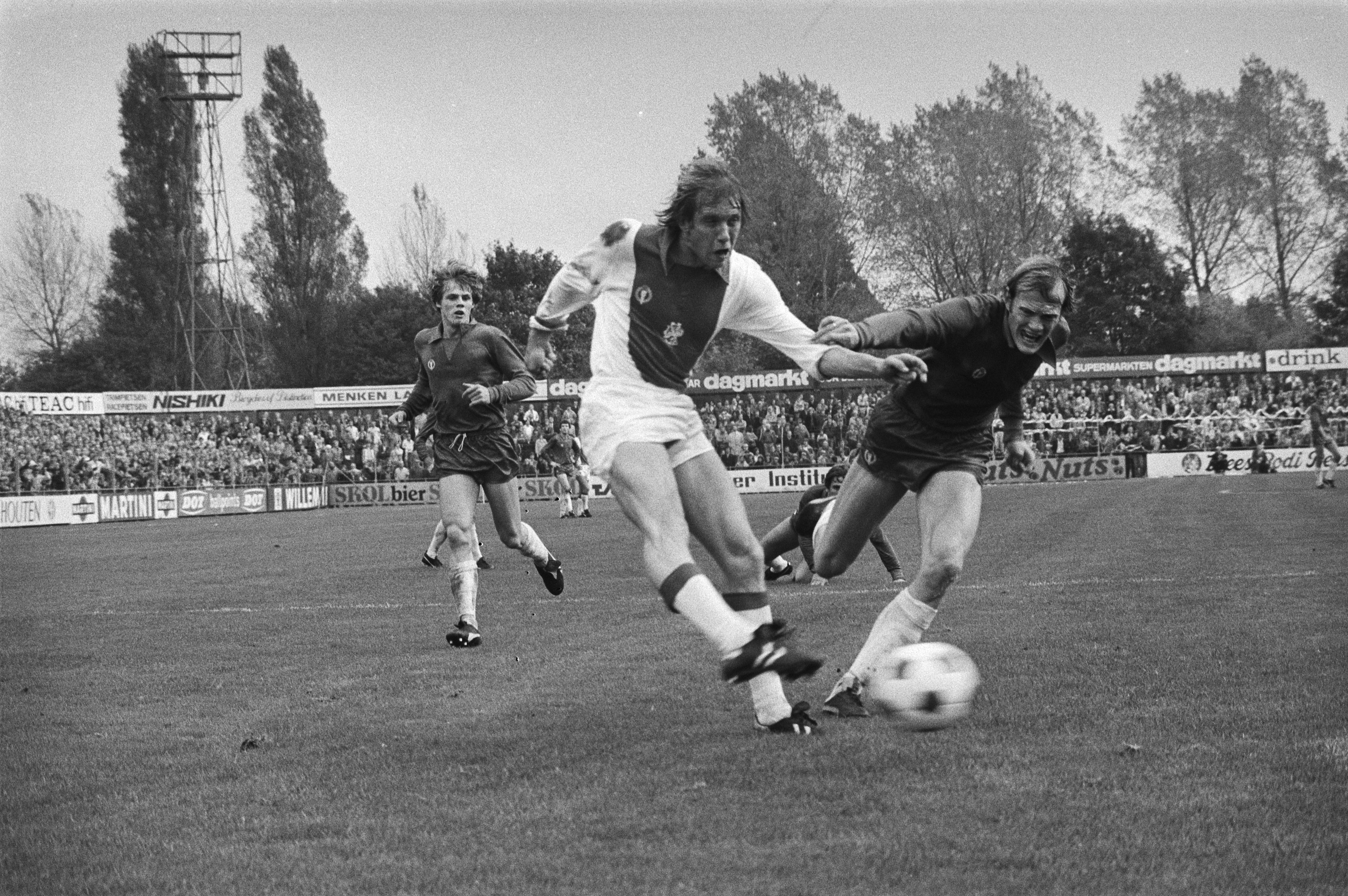
- Huijg (right) challenging Henning Jensen of AFC Ajax in a KNVB Cup match, 1979

Personal information
- Full name: Pieter Huijg
- Date of birth: 19 March 1951
- Place of birth: Velsen, Netherlands
- Date of death: 6 December 2019 (aged 68)
- Height: 1.92 m (6 ft 4 in)
- Position: Defender

Youth career
- BVC Bloemendaal

Senior career*
Years	Team	Apps	(Gls)
1970–1984	Haarlem	341	(16)
- * Club domestic league appearances and goals

Piet Huijg (19 March 1951 – 6 December 2019) was a Dutch footballer who played as a defender.

== Career ==
Born in Velsen, Huijg played youth football for BVC Bloemendaal before joining professional club Haarlem in 1970. Tall and a great header of the ball, he played 349 games with HFC Haarlem, mostly in the Dutch Eredivisie but also in the second tier. Haarlem qualified for the 1982–83 UEFA Cup and Huijg scored the team’s only goal in the second round match against Spartak Moscow. He also played in the game that became known as the Luzhniki disaster game and returned to Moscow in 2007 in remembrance of the disaster.

== Personal life ==
In 1976, Huijg opened a sporting goods store in Haarlem-North which he operated until turning it over to his daughter Ilse.

Huijg died on 6 December 2019 at the age of 68. He had been suffering from Alzheimer’s Disease.
