= Pleun Strik =

Dutch footballer (1944–2022)

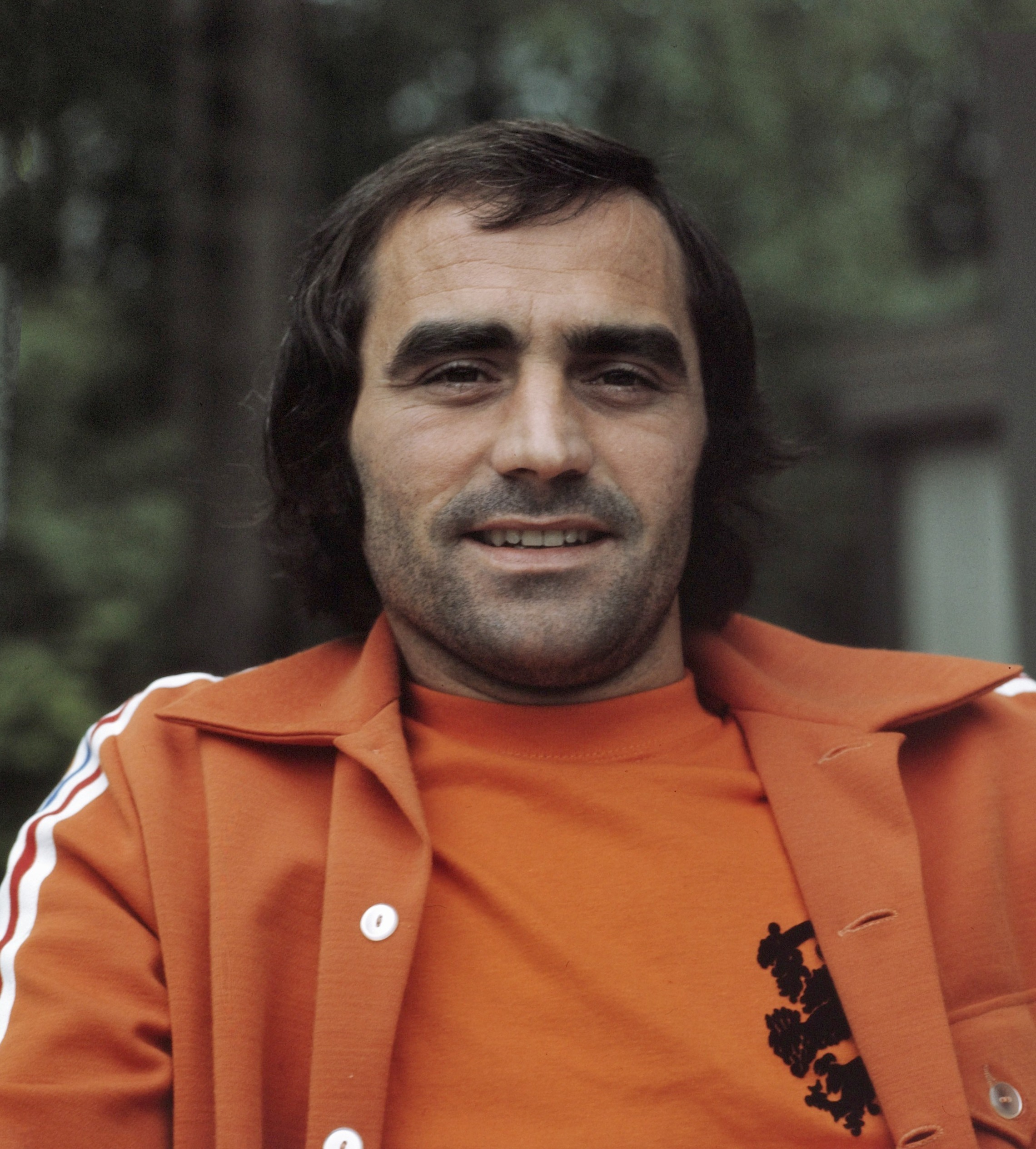
- Strik in 1974

Personal information
- Date of birth: 27 May 1944
- Place of birth: Rotterdam, Reichskommissariat Niederlande (now Netherlands)
- Date of death: 14 July 2022 (aged 78)
- Position: Defender

Youth career
- VCS Den Haag
- Feijenoord

Senior career*
Years	Team	Apps	(Gls)
1964	Feyenoord Rotterdam	0	(0)
1964–1967	Go Ahead Eagles	69	(6)
1967–1976	PSV Eindhoven	270	(8)
1976–1978	FC Eindhoven	53	(9)
1978–1982	NEC Nijmegen	105	(8)
1982–1984	VVV-Venlo	47	(1)
Total		544	(32)

International career
1969–1974	Netherlands	8	(1)
Medal record
Men's football
Representing Netherlands
FIFA World Cup
Runner-up	1974 West Germany
- * Club domestic league appearances and goals

Pleun Strik (27 May 1944 – 14 July 2022) was a Dutch professional footballer who played as a defender.

== Career ==
Strik played two matches for the Netherlands national team in the 1970 FIFA World Cup qualification tournament, and he made the Dutch squad for the 1974 FIFA World Cup, although he did not play in the tournament.

Strik played club football with PSV Eindhoven for over eight years in the late 1960s and 1970s, and made a total of 28 appearances for them in UEFA club competitions. This included four games in the 1975–76 European Cup, although he did not play in the semi-final matches against Saint-Étienne.

== Career statistics ==
=== International ===
Appearances and goals by national team and year
National team	Year	Apps	Goals
Netherlands	1969	2	0
Netherlands	1970	3	0
Netherlands	1971	2	0
Netherlands	1972	0	0
Netherlands	1973	0	0
Netherlands	1974	1	1
Total		8	1

Scores and results list the Netherlands' goal tally first, score column indicates score after each Strik goal.

List of international goals scored by Pleun Strik
No.	Date	Venue	Opponent	Score	Result	Competition
1	26 May 1974	Olympisch Stadion, Amsterdam, Netherlands	Argentina	3–1	4–1	Friendly
