= RBC Roosendaal =

Association football club in the Netherlands

RBC
- Full name: Roosendaal Boys Combinatie
- Short name: RBC
- Founded: 31 July 1912; 114 years ago (as Excelsior); 16 July 1927; 99 years ago (as R.B.C.; 'Roosendaal Boys Combinatie'); 23 October 1999; 27 years ago (as RBC Roosendaal); 2 December 2011; 14 years ago (as RBC)
- Ground: Atik Stadion
- Capacity: 5,000
- Chairman: Kees van Hassel
- Head coach: (vacant)
- League: Derde Divisie
- 2025–26: Derde Divisie B, 6th of 18
- Website: www.rbcvoetbal.nl
Home colours	Away colours

RBC, previously known as RBC Roosendaal, is a football club based in Roosendaal, Netherlands. RBC currently plays in the fourth-tier Derde Divisie after bankruptcy in 2011, restarting the club in the tenth tier Vijfde Klasse.

== History ==
=== 1912–1949: Formative years, mostly Tweede Klasse ===
RBC, the idea of Frans Mathijsen and Anton Poldermans, was formed on 31 July 1912. The club was initially called Excelsior and was renamed VV Roosendaal in 1920. On 16 July 1927, the club name changed to Roosendaal Boys Combinatie (RBC) because of the merger with Roosendaalsche Boys.

=== 1950–1999: Hovering between amateurs and professionals ===
In 1955, the club turned professional and won the Tweede Divisie B in 1957. With the leagues restructured by the KNVB the club left professional football in 1971. Between the return to professional status in 1983, RBC was a successful amateur club.

On 23 October 1999, the club's name was officially changed to RBC Roosendaal.

=== 2000s: Eredivisie for the first time ===
RBC Roosendaal badge between 1999 and its bankruptcy in 2011.

In 2000 the club reached the Eredivisie for the first time just for one season. Before 2001, RBC played its league games in stadium De Luiten, which had a capacity of 2,000 seats and 5,000 standing places. In 2001, RBC moved into its new 5,000 seater stadium. RBC returned in the Eredivisie in 2002 for four seasons.

In the 2004–05 season, RBC just avoided the relegation playoff. Relegation could not be avoided a year later, with RBC finishing bottom of the Eredivisie in the 2005–06 season.

=== 2010s: Bankruptcy and a fresh beginning ===
On 8 June 2011, RBC Roosendaal was declared bankrupt after the board failed to repay the outstanding debts of €1.6 million; this led to an automatic revocation of the professional license from KNVB. With RBC Roosendaal now out of Eerste Divisie, the board started working in order to register the club to the amateur Hoofdklasse league for the 15 June deadline. On 14 June 2011, it was announced that RBC would not play in the Hoofdklasse.

On 21 September 2011, it was announced that the club would make a new start in Dutch football under the name RBC. RBC started season 2012–13 in the Vijfde Klasse, the 9th tier in Dutch football. It played its games at Sportpark Rimboe in the village of Wouwse Plantage, just south of Roosendaal. On 7 April 2013, its first promotion since their restart was confirmed after beating VV Rimboe 10–1. It played the 2013–14 season in the Vierde Klasse. One week after winning promotion, it won the championship of the division. After the end of the 2012–13 season it was announced that RBC would return to its old ground, the RBC Stadion. After finishing runner-up two consecutive seasons, RBC won a Vierde Klasse title in 2017 and it promoted to the Derde Klasse.

=== 2020s: Promotions and a botched merger ===
At the beginning of 2020 the club was again at the brink of a bankruptcy and was exploring a merger with RKSV Halsteren. A merger agreement has been reached and was contingent to supporter input. After already agreeing on a new name and colors, the clubs decided not to merge.

In May 2020, RBC reached promotion to the Tweede Klasse after the Royal Dutch Football Association granted them the decision. RBC had won two period titles in the 2019–20 season, which had been cancelled due to the COVID-19 pandemic.

In 2023, RBC won another promotion, reaching the sixth-tier Eerste Klasse after a 6–1 home victory against VV Virtus. A year later, in 2024, it won another promotion to the Vierde Divisie after staying unbeaten in the league. In 2025, RBC Roosendaal won another promotion through a second trimester championship and promotion playoffs. Over the entire season in the Vierde Divisie C, it had ended third. It promoted to Derde Divisie through playoffs.

== Honours ==
- KNVB Cup
  - Runners-up: 1986
- Tweede Divisie B
  - Winner: 1957
- Promoted to Eredivisie
  - 2000, 2002
- Sunday Amateur Champions
  - 1973
- Sunday Hoofdklasse B
  - 1975
- Eerste Klasse
  - 1973, 1974, 1980, 2024
- Tweede Klasse
  - 1941, 1949, 1972, 2023
- Derde Klasse
  - 2020
- Vierde Klasse
  - 2017
- Vijfde Klasse
  - 2013

== Results ==
10; 2A	7; 2A	6; 2A	5; 2A	4; 2A	8; 2A	8; 2A	8; 2A	7; 2A	6; 2A	9; 2A	2; 2A	1; C	1; 2D	2; 2E	2; 2E	2; 2E	-	11	7; 2A	6; 2A	1; 2B	5	4; 1D	12; 1C	11; 1D	10; 1D	10; D	8; A	1; B	13; A	9; B	16; B	15; A	4; B	4	11	14	13	15	14	18	7	15	1; 2B	1; 1E	1; 1E	1; C	4; C	13; C	2; 1E	7; 1E	1; 1E	2; C	2; C	4; C	14	11	10	13	7	17	17	10	5	7	14	15	13	15	18	12	6	18	3	13	12	16	18	3	11	16	11	17	-	1; 5C	8; 4D	2; 4B	2; 4B	1; 4B	9; 3A	3; 3A	1; 3A	-	4; 2A	1; 2A	1; 1E	3; 4C	– 3B
28	29	30	31	32	33	34	35	36	37	38	39	40	41	42	43	44	45	46	47	48	49	50	51	52	53	54	55	56	57	58	59	60	61	62	63	64	65	66	67	68	69	70	71	72	73	74	75	76	77	78	79	80	81	82	83	84	85	86	87	88	89	90	91	92	93	94	95	96	97	98	99	00	01	02	03	04	05	06	07	08	09	10	11	12	13	14	15	16	17	18	19	20	21	22	23	24	25	26

Eredivisie	Eerste Divisie	Eerste klasse (professional league)	Tweede Divisie	Derde Divisie	Hoofdklasse/Vierde Divisie

Eerste Klasse	Tweede Klasse	Derde Klasse	Vierde Klasse	Emergency League
