= Willy van der Kuijlen =

Dutch footballer and scout (1946–2021)

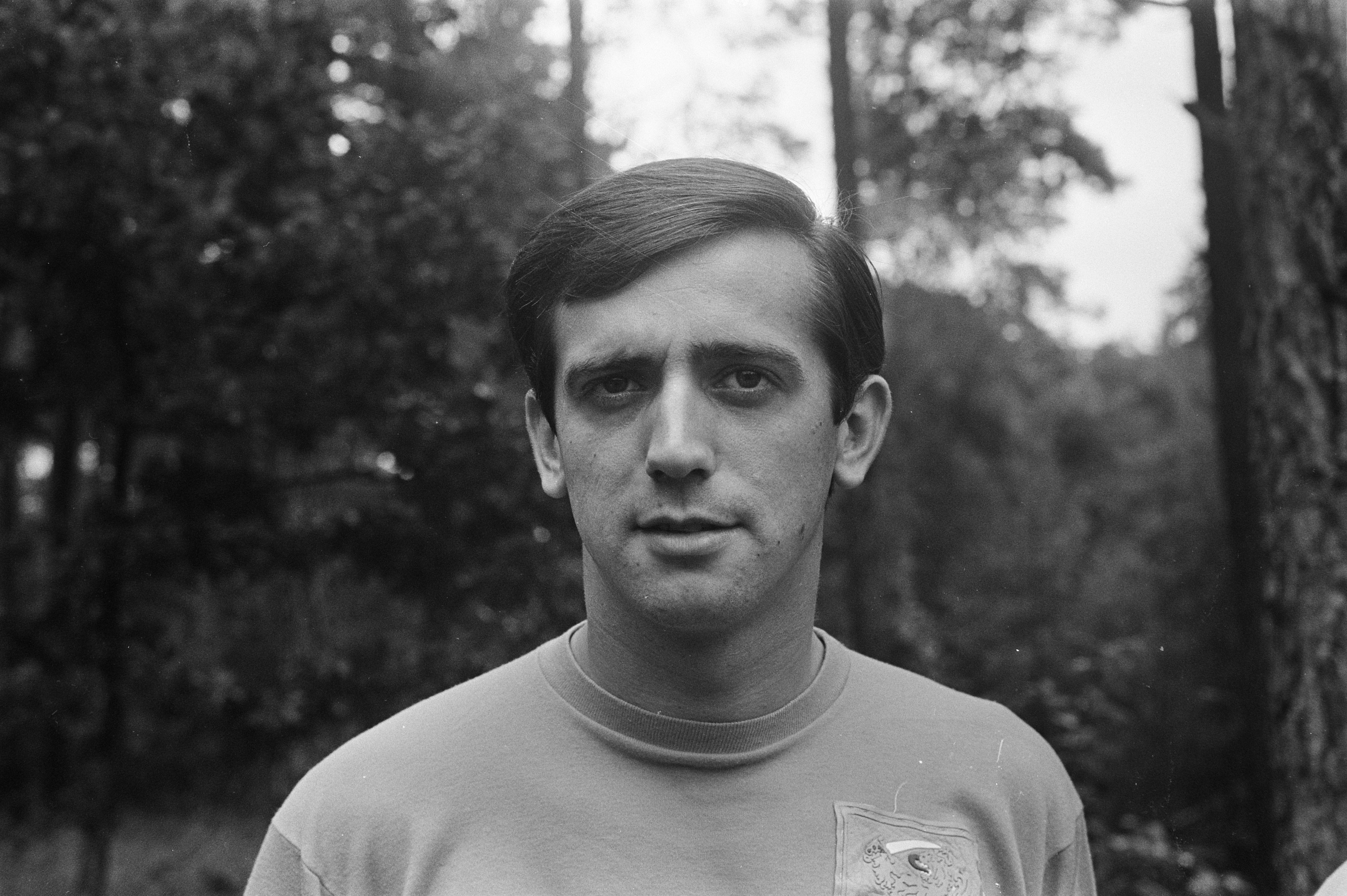
- Van der Kuijlen in 1968

Personal information
- Full name: Wilhelmus Martinus Leonardus; Johannes van der Kuijlen
- Date of birth: 6 December 1946
- Place of birth: Helmond, Netherlands
- Date of death: 19 April 2021 (aged 74)
- Place of death: Helmond, Netherlands
- Height: 1.81 m (5 ft 11 in)
- Positions: Attacking midfielder; forward

Youth career
- 1953–1964: HVV Helmond

Senior career*
Years	Team	Apps	(Gls)
1964–1981	PSV	528	(308)
1981–1982	MVV	16	(3)
Total		544	(311)

International career
1966–1977	Netherlands	22	(7)
- * Club domestic league appearances and goals

Wilhelmus Martinus Leonardus Johannes "Willy" van der Kuijlen (Dutch pronunciation: [ˈʋili vɑn dər ˈkœylə(n)]; 6 December 1946 – 19 April 2021) was a Dutch football player and a scout for PSV Eindhoven.

Van der Kuijlen was born in Helmond and started his youth career at local club HVV. In 1964, he was signed by PSV Eindhoven. Van der Kuijlen ended up playing for the club 18 years, winning three Eredivisie titles, two domestic cups and the UEFA Cup in 1978. He was also crowned Eredivisie top scorer three times. After short periods with MVV Maastricht and Overpelt, he retired at age 37. After his playing career, Van der Kuijlen returned to PSV as assistant manager, first team coach, youth coach and scout. He also briefly served as assistant manager at Roda JC.

Van der Kuijlen played 528 league games and scored 308 times for PSV, both being all-time club records. With 311 career goals in total, Van der Kuijlen also holds the all-time Eredivisie goal record. He won 22 caps and scored seven goals for the Netherlands national team in the 1960s and 1970s, but his international career was marred by frequent clashes with Johan Cruyff and his allies.

== Early years ==
Van der Kuijlen was raised in Helmond and started playing football from an early age. At eight years old, he joined local club HVV Helmond, even though boys were not able to join until the age of nine. Van der Kuijlen became noteworthy because of his goalscoring abilities. He attended school to become a tiler, but quit in favour of becoming a football player. At the age of fifteen, Van der Kuijlen debuted in the HVV Helmond first team. In 1963, he attracted interest from PSV Eindhoven and played a test match for them against De Valk in May. The team offered him a contract, but Van der Kuijlen declined; he could only receive a youth contract and the offered wages were lower than his deal with HVV at the time. While playing for HVV Helmond, he managed to score 69 goals in 63 matches for the amateur side. In 1964, PSV and thirteen other clubs (including Belgian sides) were interested in signing the youngster. This time, Van der Kuijlen opted to play for PSV.

== Club career ==
=== Early career ===
Van der Kuijlen started out with a semi-professional contract; signing a contract with PSV Eindhoven meant that he could also work at Philips. On weekdays, he would work as a warehouse worker. Van der Kuijlen debuted in a friendly match on 7 August 1964 against SVV, scoring five goals in a 6–1 victory. His Eredivisie debut was on 23 August 1964 in a match against Fortuna ’54. Van der Kuijlen scored the only goal in a 2–1 loss. In the second league match, he managed to score three goals in PSV's 3–1 victory over SC Enschede. In his first season at PSV (as the youngest player in the league), the team finished second in the league and Van der Kuijlen also finished second in the Eredivisie top scorer ranking with twenty goals. In the 1965–66 season, Van der Kuijlen, who just turned 20, became league topscorer with 23 goals. In the final league round, PSV managed to beat FC Twente 7–1 in Enschede; Van der Kuijlen scored four times in that match.

In the following years, Van der Kuijlen faced a few struggles in his career. His Philips job and a call up for the military draft proved difficult to combine with his football. In both the 1966–67 and the 1967–68 season, Van der Kuijlen still produced 21 league goals but a lack of chemistry between him and PSV coach Milan Nikolić also made his performances suffer. In 1968, PSV was struggling in the league and battling relegation. As a result, Nikolić was sacked and in the wake of his departure, Van der Kuijlen immediately scored four goals in a 5–1 victory against DWS. After a few important wins, PSV ended 14th in the Eredivisie. In the 1968–69 season PSV appointed Kurt Linder as the new coach. But once again, Van der Kuijlen did not get along with his coach, having trouble with Linder's harsh coaching style. This situation almost led to a transfer by Van der Kuijlen to Helmond Sport, his hometown side. They could not afford his transfer fee though, and Van der Kuijlen ultimately signed a new contract with PSV.

In both the 1968–69 and the 1969–70 season, PSV reached (but lost) the cup final. In the latter season, Van der Kuijlen became the Eredivisie top scorer for the second time with 26 goals. The following two seasons were less successful for Van der Kuijlen, with 14 goals in the 1970–71 season, and 6 goals in the 1971–72 season. Linder's departure in 1972 changed his situation at the club. PSV's new coach was Kees Rijvers, who would connect very well with Van der Kuijlen in the coming years.

=== Domestic success and the UEFA Cup victory ===
Rijvers gave Van der Kuijlen the free playmaker role in the team. He also formed a successful striker partnership with new signing Ralf Edström. In 1974, Van der Kuijlen scored 27 goals (which included four in a 10–0 victory against Go Ahead Eagles) and was once again the league's top scorer. Real Madrid, Nice, Anderlecht and Valencia CF were interested in signing him, but PSV rejected any incoming offers. The offer from Madrid was kept secret by PSV director Ben van Gelder and Van der Kuijlen's agent Jo Verstappen. The season finale was the KNVB beker final against NAC, which PSV won 6–0. Van der Kuijlen scored a hat-trick in that match. In the 1974–75 season, Van der Kuijlen won his first Eredivisie title. He contributed to the success with 28 league goals. In November of that season, a peculiar moment occurred for Van der Kuijlen when he shot a free kick at goal in a match against FC Wageningen. The ball entered the goal, but ended up outside the goal because of a hole in the netting. After long deliberation, the referee acknowledged the goal.

In the following year, PSV won the league and the domestic cup, and reached the semifinals of the European Cup. Van der Kuijlen scored 27 league goals. After the two consecutive titles, PSV ended second in 1977. Edström left the squad after the season, breaking up his partnership with Van der Kuijlen, but also giving way for a new playing style. PSV's game would become more varied, with Rijvers making the team play without a set striker. Van der Kuijlen and Gerrie Deijkers would take turns during matches in becoming the front man. Although he was not keen on becoming captain (declaring that he was "too busy with his own game"), Van der Kuijlen was appointed the team skipper before the 1977–78 season.

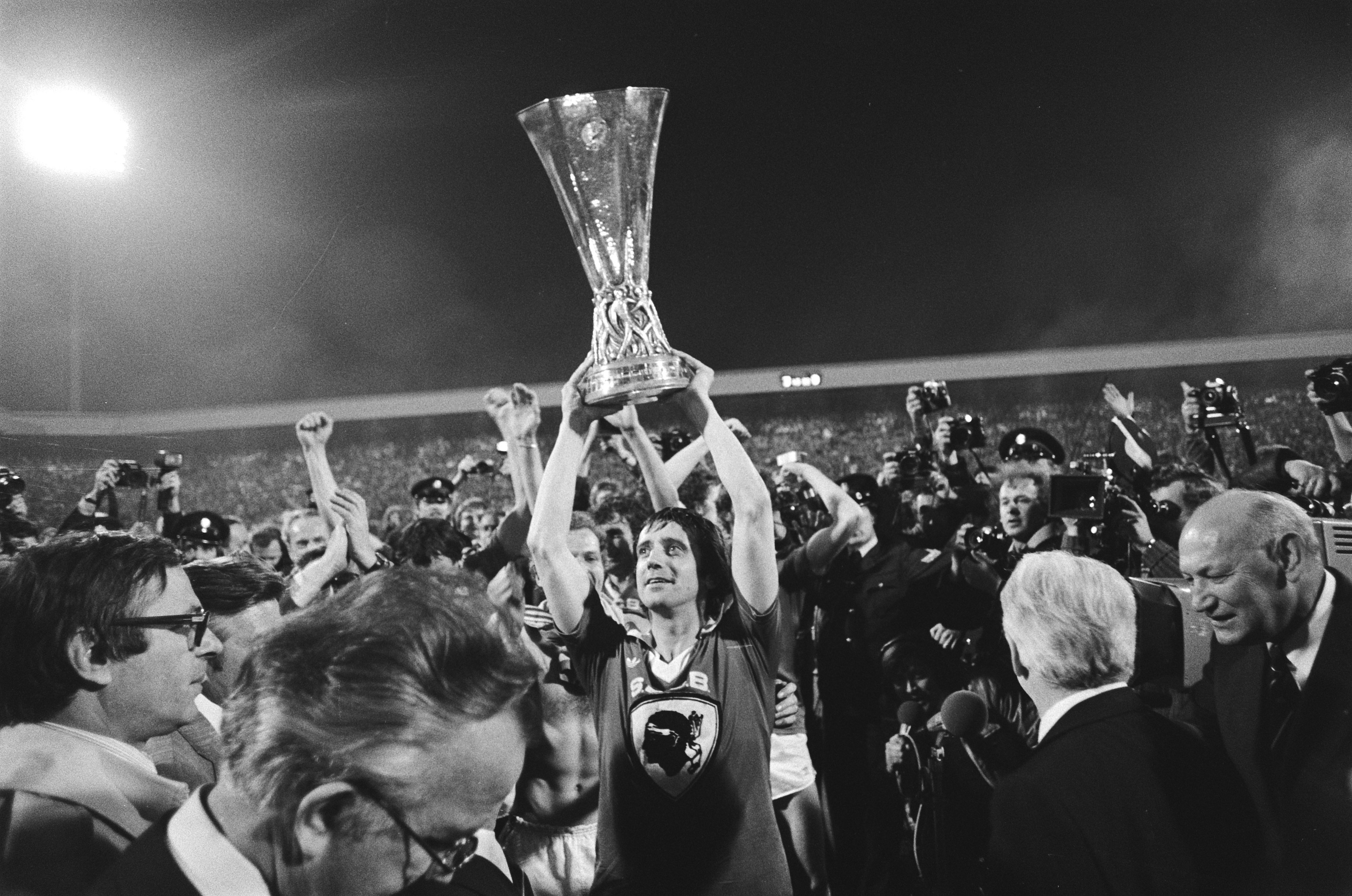
Van der Kuijlen celebrating with the UEFA Cup after the final victory in Eindhoven

That year turned out to be the most successful season in his career, after PSV won the Eredivisie, the domestic cup and the UEFA Cup. In the UEFA Cup semi-finals, PSV faced FC Barcelona, with Johan Cruyff and Johan Neeskens as opponents. PSV won 4–3 on aggregate and advanced to the finals, where Bastia was beaten 3–0 at home (after a goalless draw in the first leg). Van der Kuijlen scored the third and final goal: a pass by Jan Poortvliet resulted in an effort that first hit the post, but rebounded back into his feet, enabling him to score nonetheless. Van der Kuijlen declared that "it was one of the few times we played really well on the European level. When you score a goal like that it stays in your memory."

=== Later years ===
After the UEFA Cup victory, the squad slowly disintegrated. In the 1978-79 season, PSV ended third in the league. Van der Kuijlen scored four times in a 1978 European Cup match against Fenerbahçe (6-1). In the league, he scored 14 goals. In the 1979-80 season, PSV finished third again, with Van der Kuijlen's goal tally decreasing to 12 goals. When Rijvers left in 1980, he was replaced by Thijs Libregts, who often benched Van der Kuijlen in favour of others. A six-minute substitute appearance against N.E.C. on 29 August 1981 was deemed humiliating by Van der Kuijlen, who requested to leave the club. He was transferred to MVV Maastricht, where he played for one season. In Maastricht, he appeared in 17 matches, while scoring three goals. When Van der Kuijlen left MVV, he briefly played for Belgian side Overpelt Fabriek, before officially retiring. In total, he played 538 league games and scored 308 goals for PSV; both statistics still stand as the highest number of games and goals anyone has produced for the club. Van der Kuijlen's 29 goals in European competitions is also a PSV record. His 311 Eredivisie goals remain a Dutch record.

== International career ==
While playing for HVV Helmond, Van der Kuijlen played for the Dutch under-19 national squad. After a call-up from coach George Kessler, Van der Kuijlen made his debut for the Dutch senior national team on 23 March 1966 in a match against West Germany, aged 19. His international career started encouragingly: in his first five caps, he scored four times. Subsequently, Van der Kuijlen received intermittent call-ups until 1970. Because he was occupied with his military draft, he could not play for the national squad very often. Meanwhile, his playmaker position in the Dutch team was slowly taken over by Johan Cruyff. From 1970, he had to wait four years before appearing for the Dutch squad again. The Netherlands were scheduled to play the 1974 FIFA World Cup, but Van der Kuijlen (who almost certainly would be benched in favour of Cruyff) declined to appear at the tournament.

Other reasons why Van der Kuijlen's international career never took off were frequent clashes between Van der Kuijlen, his PSV teammate Jan van Beveren and Cruyff. The feud between PSV players on one side and the Ajax and Feyenoord players on the other originated in the sixties, when Van Beveren criticised Cruyff's will to play for the Dutch team. In return, Van der Kuijlen and Van Beveren's reluctance to adapt to Cruyff's ways had led to harassment from the Ajax and Feyenoord players. One way was to keep passing the ball only between Ajax players in Dutch matches, leaving Van der Kuijlen out of the game. His biggest issue with Cruyff was the preferential treatment he would get from the coach, teammates and the Dutch FA. In 1975, the Dutch team was in training to prepare for a match against Poland. After Cruyff and his FC Barcelona-team member Johan Neeskens took the liberty to arrive a few days late for a Dutch team training camp, coach George Knobel paused the training just to welcome the two. Van der Kuijlen responded to this with: “Here come the kings of Spain”. Angered, Cruyff approached Knobel, forcing him to choose between him and Van der Kuijlen. Knobel sided with Cruyff, resulting in Van der Kuijlen and Van Beveren leaving the team.

Because of these issues, Van der Kuijlen retired from international football in 1975, but retracted this decision a year later after a talk with the coach. In the 1970s, Van der Kuijlen sporadically played for The Netherlands. In 1975, he scored three times in a Euro 1976 qualifying match against Finland, bringing his goal tally to seven. In October 1977, he played his twenty-second and final cap in an away match against Northern Ireland; he came on as a substitute for Cruyff in the 71st minute.

Despite their apparent rivalry on the pitch, Van der Kuijlen said that he never had any personal issues with Cruyff, testifying that they even once celebrated Carnival, together with their wives, in the late 1960s. Van der Kuijlen was also selected by Cruyff for the Dutch squad of the 20th century and they both participated in the Match of the Century, a testimonial against a squad of best foreign players that played in the Eredivisie, on 21 December 1999.

== Style of play ==
Van der Kuijlen usually played in the playmaker or second striker position. He would often drop into the midfield in an attempt to control the game from there. Although Van der Kuijlen was right-footed at first, he trained to become a two-footed player. He was famed for his shot power and technical abilities; his powerful shot earned him the nickname ‘Skiete Willy’ (‘Shoot, Willy’ in regional, eastern North Brabant vernacular). After Ralf Edström joined PSV in 1974, he and Van der Kuijlen formed an effective duo. The partnership's trademark was Edström receiving a long ball with his head and delivering it to Van der Kuijlen, who would stand just outside the penalty box for an attempt at goal. Later in his career, he would form a new partnership with Harry Lubse. Van der Kuijlen rarely headed a ball or tackled a player. As a consequence, Van der Kuijlen only received one yellow card in his entire career. Van der Kuijlen acknowledged his lack of defensive skills, but mentioned that "Rijvers took care of that by letting other team members compensate that". It enabled him to excel in the attacking part.

== Post-career ==
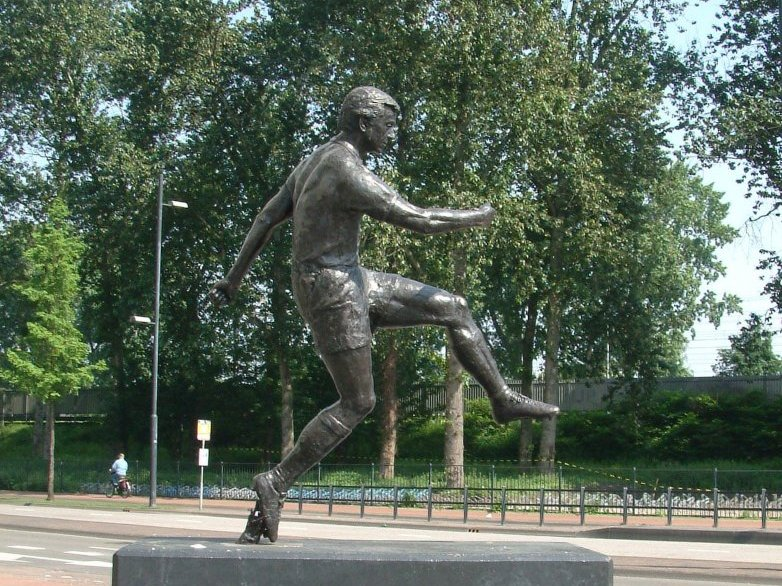
In 2004, a statue of Van der Kuijlen was revealed at the Philips Stadion

After Van der Kuijlen retired, he served as attacking coach and assistant manager for PSV Eindhoven. In 1988, he became assistant manager at Roda JC after Jan Reker was signed as head coach. Later, he returned to PSV as a youth coach. Since 2004, Van der Kuijlen served as a scout for the club. Besides that position, Van der Kuijlen also participated in representative and ceremonial tasks for the club. In 2012, Van der Kuijlen signed a two-year extension of his contract with PSV. Directors Tiny Sanders and Marcel Brands also announced that as long as they are in charge, Van der Kuijlen can always remain at the club.

Van der Kuijlen received recognition for his playing career by PSV and their fans. He was an honorary member of PSV, and in the Philips Stadion one of the reception halls is named after him. In October 2004, a statue of Van der Kuijlen was erected outside of the Philips Stadion. In November 2011, his biography Onze Willy ('Our Willy') was published, written by journalist Frans van den Nieuwenhof. The first edition was presented to Van der Kuijlen by Bert van Marwijk, who was then manager of the Dutch national team. Together with the release of the book, he received an honorary Helmond city badge from mayor Fons Jacobs. On 10 December 2011, Van der Kuijlen's 65th birthday was celebrated in the Philips Stadion during the Eredivisie match PSV-NAC Breda. He was joined by the 1978 PSV team that won the UEFA Cup.

=== Death and legacy ===
Van der Kuijlen later suffered from Alzheimer's disease. He died on 19 April 2021 at the age of 74.

As of the 2020-21 season, the top goal scorer of the season in the Dutch Eredivisie receives the Willy van der Kuijlen Trofee (Willy van der Kuijlen Trophy).

== Career statistics ==
=== Club ===
Appearances and goals by club, season and competition
Club	Season	League		KNVB Cup		Continental	
Club	Season	Apps	Goals	Apps	Goals	Apps	Goals
PSV Eindhoven	1964–65	27	20		2	–	
PSV Eindhoven	1965–66	30	23	6	9	–	
PSV Eindhoven	1966–67	34	21		0	–	
PSV Eindhoven	1967–68	32	21		6	–	
PSV Eindhoven	1968–69	34	11	7	7	–	
PSV Eindhoven	1969–70	32	26	6	4	4	2
PSV Eindhoven	1970–71	30	14		2	8	1
PSV Eindhoven	1971–72	26	6		0	3	0
PSV Eindhoven	1972–73	32	13		1	–	
PSV Eindhoven	1973–74	34	27		7	–	
PSV Eindhoven	1974–75	32	28		1	8	8
PSV Eindhoven	1975–76	33	27	5	10	8	4
PSV Eindhoven	1976–77	32	24		1	4	2
PSV Eindhoven	1977–78	32	13	2	1	11	5
PSV Eindhoven	1978–79	28	14		3	3	4
PSV Eindhoven	1979–80	28	12	5	2	4	0
PSV Eindhoven	1980–81	27	8		1	4	3
PSV Eindhoven	1981–82	5	0	0	0	1	0
PSV Eindhoven	Total	528	308	62	57	58	29
MVV Maastricht	1981–82	17	3	1	2	–	
Career total		545	311	63	59	58	29

=== International ===
Appearances and goals by national team and year
National team	Year	Apps	Goals
Netherlands	1966	5	4
Netherlands	1967	1	0
Netherlands	1968	5	0
Netherlands	1969	1	0
Netherlands	1970	1	0
Netherlands	1971	0	0
Netherlands	1972	0	0
Netherlands	1973	0	0
Netherlands	1974	1	0
Netherlands	1975	3	3
Netherlands	1976	2	0
Netherlands	1977	3	0
Total		22	7

Scores and results list the Netherlands' goal tally first, score column indicates score after each Van der Kuijlen goal.

List of international goals scored by Willy van der Kuijlen
No.	Date	Venue	Opponent	Score	Result	Competition
1	17 April 1966	De Kuip, Rotterdam	Belgium	1–0	3–1	Friendly
2	11 May 1966	Hampden Park, Glasgow	Scotland	2–0	3–0	Friendly
3	11 May 1966	Hampden Park, Glasgow	Scotland	3–0	3–0	Friendly
4	30 November 1966	De Kuip, Rotterdam	Denmark	2–0	2–0	UEFA Euro 1968 qualifier
5	3 September 1975	De Goffert, Nijmegen	Finland	1–1	4–1	UEFA Euro 1976 qualifier
6	3 September 1975	De Goffert, Nijmegen	Finland	2–1	4–1	UEFA Euro 1976 qualifier
7	3 September 1975	De Goffert, Nijmegen	Finland	4–1	4–1	UEFA Euro 1976 qualifier

== Honours ==
PSV Eindhoven

- Eredivisie: 1974–75, 1975–76, 1977–78
- KNVB Cup: 1973–74, 1975–76
- UEFA Cup: 1977–78

Individual

- Eredivisie Top Scorer: 1965–66 (shared with Piet Kruiver), 1969–70, 1973–74

== See also ==
- List of men's footballers with 500 or more goals
