= André Zwally =

Luxembourgish footballer

Personal information
- Date of birth: 18 October 1955 (age 71)
- Position: Forward

Senior career*
Years	Team	Apps	(Gls)
1972–1986	Jeunesse Esch		

International career
1977–1980	Luxembourg	6	(0)
- * Club domestic league appearances and goals

André Zwally (born 18 October 1955) is a retired Luxembourgish football striker.
