= RBC Stadion =

Football stadium in Roosendaal, Netherlands

Coordinates: 51°32′26″N 4°27′15″E

Atik Stadium
- Atik Stadion
- Address: Borchwerf 4, 4704 RG Roosendaal; Roosendaal; Netherlands
- Capacity: 5,000

The Atik Stadion, former name among others Vast & Goed Stadion, Rosada Stadion and MariFlex Stadion, is a multi-use stadium in Roosendaal, Netherlands. It is used mostly for football matches. The stadium is able to hold 5,000 people and was built in 2000. It was the home of the club RBC Roosendaal until the club went bankrupt in June 2011. From the 2013‑14 season on it is again the home stadium of RBC now playing as an amateur club. The stadium was renamed to Herstaco Stadion. It also houses the national football Museum: voetbalexperience.
