= Peter Kemper =

Dutch footballer (1942–2020)

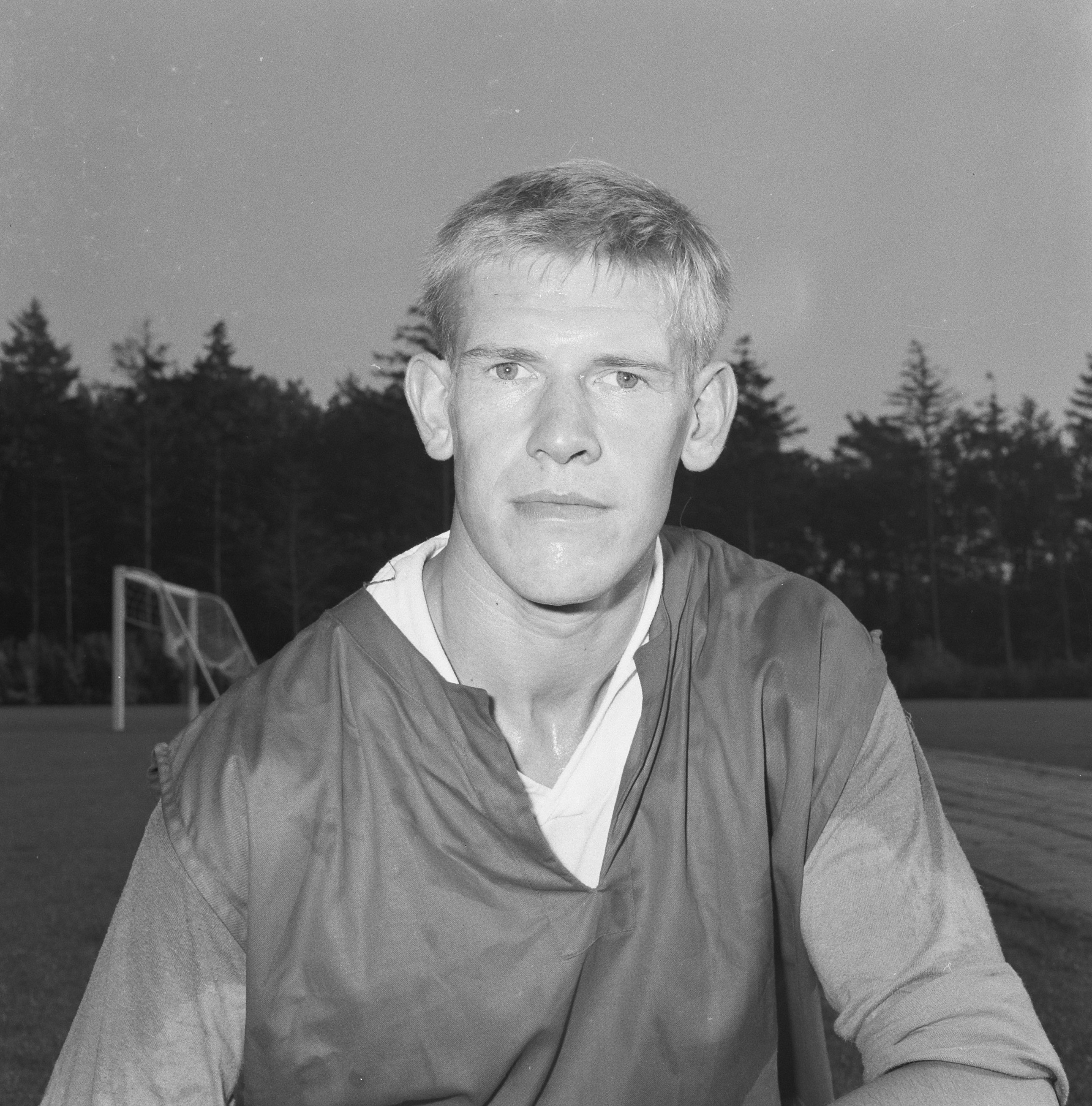

Personal information
- Full name: Pieter Andreas Kemper
- Date of birth: 13 October 1942
- Place of birth: The Hague, Netherlands
- Date of death: 25 March 2020 (aged 77)
- Place of death: Netherlands
- Position: Defender

Youth career
- LenS

Senior career*
Years	Team	Apps	(Gls)
1961–1975	PSV	219	(6)
1975–1976	Helmond Sport		

International career
1964–1967	Netherlands	3	(0)
- * Club domestic league appearances and goals

Peter Kemper (13 October 1942 – 25 March 2020) was a Dutch footballer who played as a defender.

== Club career ==
Born in The Hague, Kemper played for local amateur side Lenig en Snel before joining PSV Eindhoven in 1961. In 14 seasons with PSV, he won two league titles. He played over 200 league and almost 20 European competition matches for the club. Next to his 219 Eredivisie appearances he played 17 matches in the European Cup, the UEFA Cup Winners' Cup and the UEFA Cup. He finished his career with Helmond Sport.

== International career ==
Kemper made his debut for the Netherlands in an October 1964 FIFA World Cup qualification away against Albania and earned a total of 3 caps, scoring no goals. His final international was an April 1967 friendly match against Belgium.

== Personal life ==
After retiring as a player, he worked as a gym teacher at schools and was part of the KNVB disciplinary committee for 33 years. He suffered from a heart attack in 1990 but recovered. He died of heart failure in March 2020.

== Honours ==
- Eredivisie: 2

1963, 1975
