= Jan Groenendijk (footballer) =

Dutch footballer

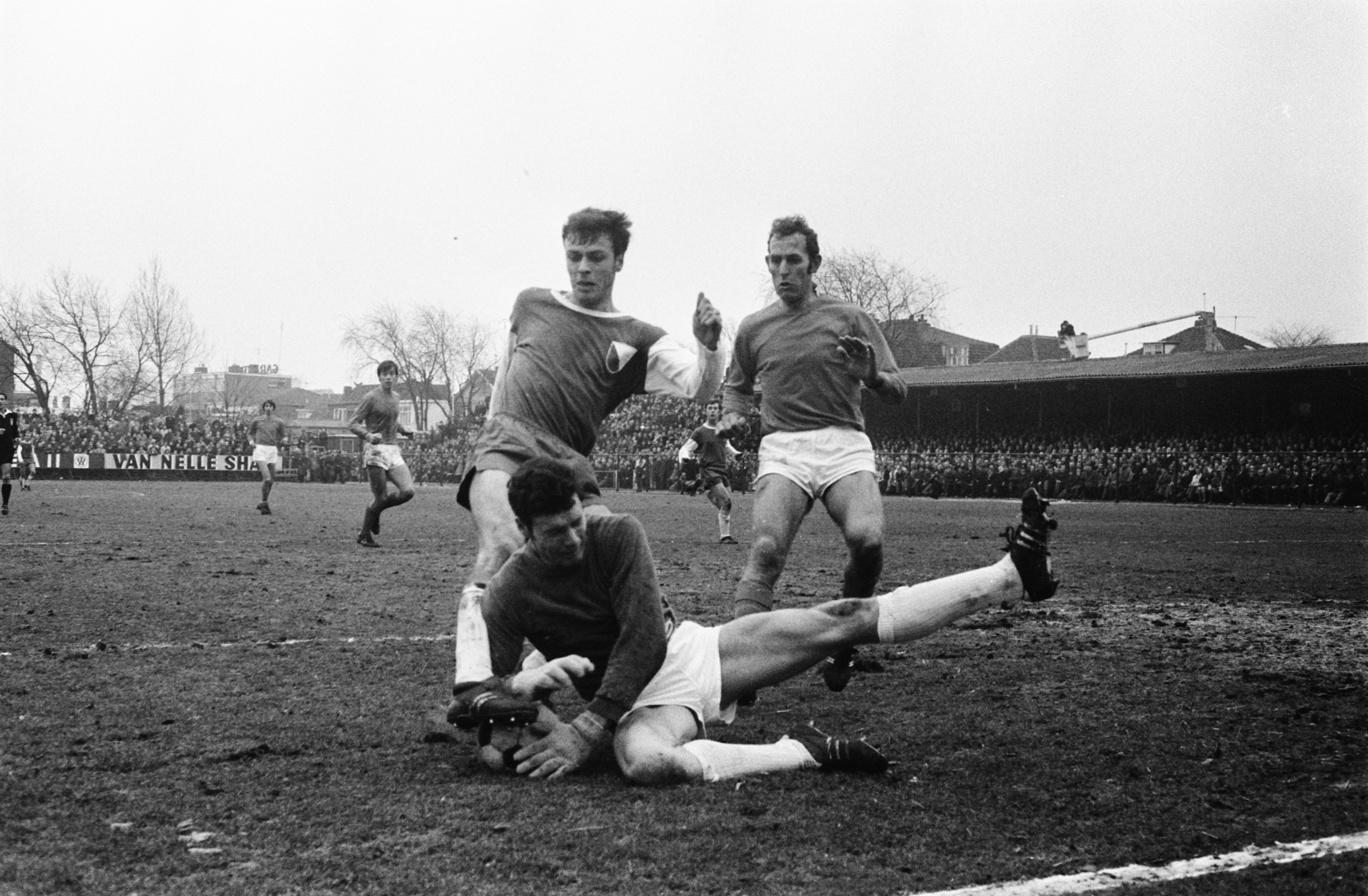
- Elinkwijk against Volendam 0-2.1. Number 18 Groenendijk, keeper

Personal information
- Date of birth: 6 July 1946
- Place of birth: Heinenoord, Netherlands
- Date of death: 9 February 2014 (aged 67)
- Place of death: Culemborg, Netherlands
- Position: Forward

Youth career
- –1961: Heinenoord
- 1961–1963: Geinoord

Senior career*
Years	Team	Apps	(Gls)
1969–1970	Elinkwijk	33	(23)
1970–1972	FC Utrecht	66	(33)
1972–1974	Go Ahead Eagles	58	(13)
1974–1977	Wageningen	90	(40)
Total		247	(109)
- * Club domestic league appearances and goals as of 10 February 2014

Jan Groenendijk (6 July 1946 – 9 February 2014) was a Dutch football player.

== Club career ==
Born in Heinenoord, Groenendijk came through the youth ranks at hometown club SV Heinenoord but moved to Vreeswijk with his parents and subsequently joined local side Geinoord. He made his professional debut in the Eerste Divisie for Elinkwijk and joined new club FC Utrecht who were formed by a merger of DOS, Elinkwijk and Velox in 1970. On Wednesday 19 August 1970 he became the first ever goalscorer of the new club after scoring in 1-4 defeat by Feyenoord. He would become the club's first top goalscorer that season with 18.

He later played for Go Ahead Eagles and Wageningen.

== Death ==
Groenendijk died of esophageal cancer on 9 February 2014.
