= Ralf Edström =

Swedish footballer (born 1952)

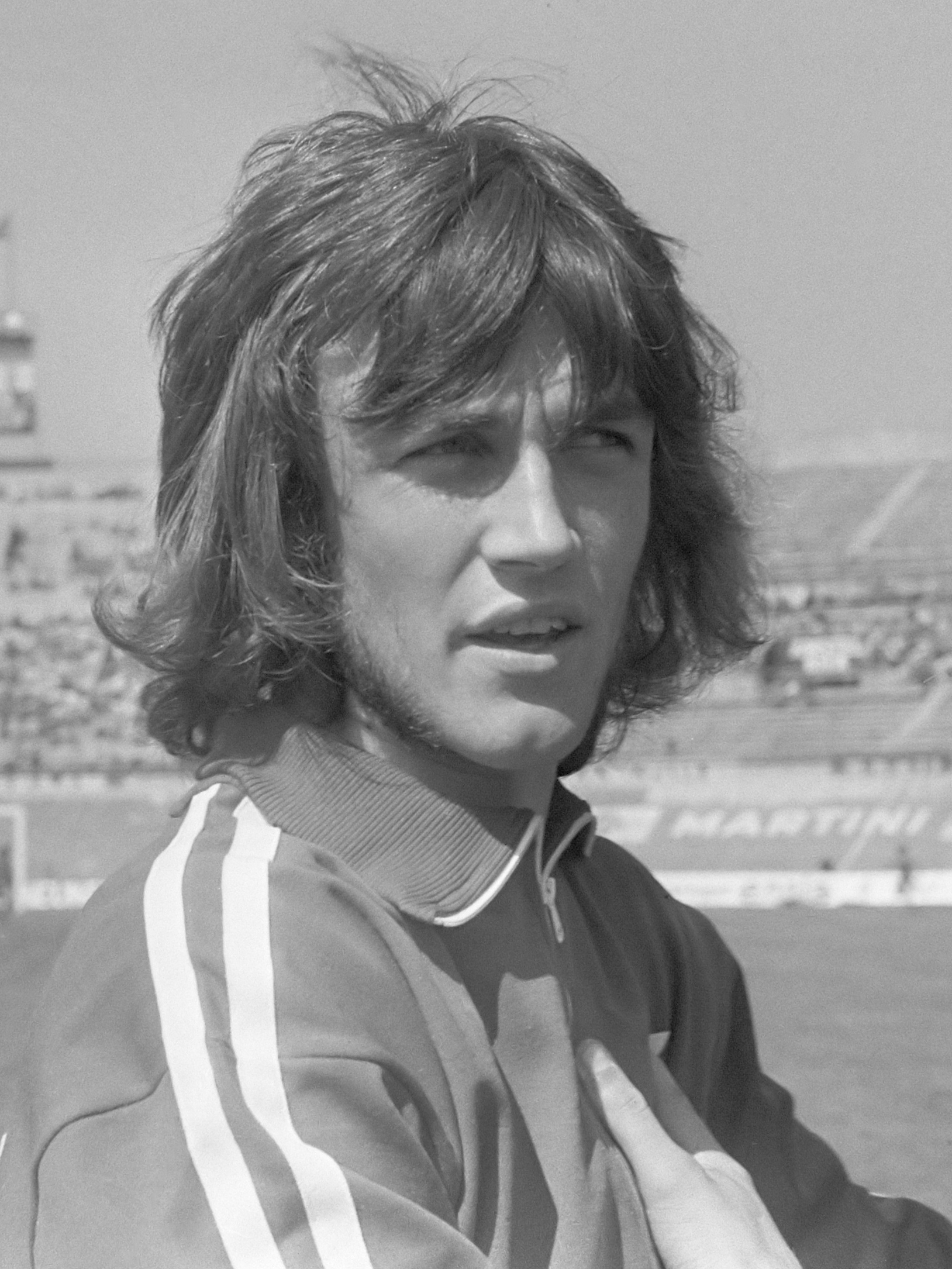
- Ralf Edström in 1973

Personal information
- Full name: Ralf Sigvard Edström
- Date of birth: 7 October 1952 (age 74)
- Place of birth: Degerfors, Sweden
- Height: 1.91 m (6 ft 3 in)
- Position: Forward

Youth career
- –1971: Degerfors IF

Senior career*
Years	Team	Apps	(Gls)
1968–1970	Degerfors IF		
1971–1973	Åtvidabergs FF	52	(28)
1973–1977	PSV Eindhoven	153	(81)
1977–1979	IFK Göteborg	37	(14)
1979–1981	Standard Liège	51	(27)
1981–1983	AS Monaco	49	(16)
1983–1985	Örgryte IS	0	(0)
Total		301	(140)

International career
1969–1971	Sweden U19	14	(9)
1971–1972	Sweden U21	7	(4)
1972–1980	Sweden	40	(15)
- * Club domestic league appearances and goals

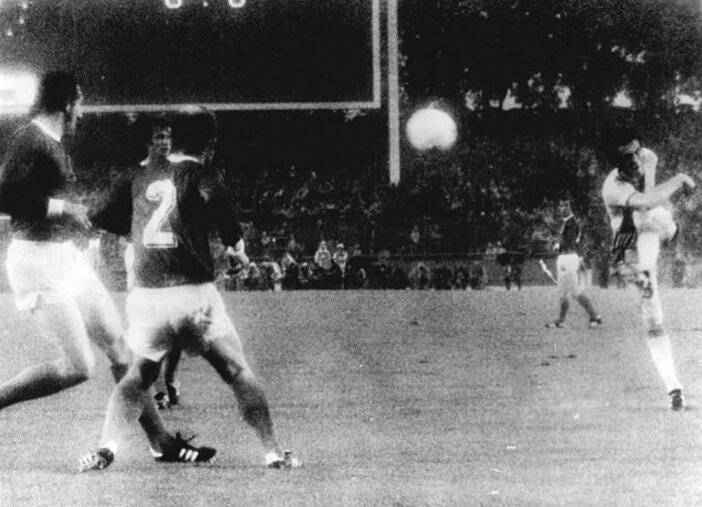
Ralf Edström scoring 1–0 against West Germany in the 1974 FIFA World Cup

Ralf Sigvard Edström (born 7 October 1952) is a Swedish former professional footballer who played as a forward. Widely regarded as Sweden's best player in the 1970s, he started off his career with Degerfors IF in the late 1960s and went on to represent Åtvidabergs FF, PSV Eindhoven, IFK Göteborg, Standard Liege, and AS Monaco before retiring at Örgryte IS in 1985. A full international between 1972 and 1980, he won 40 caps for the Sweden national team and scored 15 goals. He represented his country at the 1974 and 1978 FIFA World Cups and was awarded Guldbollen as Sweden's best player in 1972 and 1974.

== Club career ==
Starting his career in Degerfors IF, a club known to produce many young talents, Edström moved to Åtvidabergs FF and became national champion in 1972. He moved to PSV Eindhoven in 1973 and was part of the team that became national champion in 1974–75 and 1975–76. On club level, he became not only Swedish Champion, but also Dutch (twice) and French Champion. He also won the Swedish, Dutch and Belgian Cups and was voted Swedish player of the year twice (1972 and 1974, winning Guldbollen). He injured his knee while at AS Monaco which prevented him from playing any games for Örgryte IS and ultimately led to his retirement from professional football in 1985.

== International career ==
Edström made 40 appearances for the Sweden national team and scored 15 times. He is most noted for his performance in the 1974 FIFA World Cup where he had a big part in Sweden finishing fifth, and he made six appearances and scored four goals during this tournament.

While representing Sweden at the 1978 FIFA World Cup in Argentina, Edström was arrested for speaking to a person in Buenos Aires; however, the Argentine military released him upon recognising its error (that he was not one of its citizens but a professional footballer who was in the country for the tournament it was hosting).

== Personal life ==
He has been an expert radio commentator since the 1980s.

== Career statistics ==
=== Club ===
Appearances and goals by club, season and competition
Club	Season	League			Cup		Continental		Other		Total	
Club	Season	Division	Apps	Goals	Apps	Goals	Apps	Goals	Apps	Goals	Apps	Goals
Åtvidaberg	1971	Allsvenskan	22	6								
Åtvidaberg	1972	Allsvenskan	19	16								
Åtvidaberg	1973	Allsvenskan	11	6								
Åtvidaberg	Total		52	28								
PSV Eindhoven	1973–74	Eredivisie	33	19								
PSV Eindhoven	1974–75	Eredivisie	32	16								
PSV Eindhoven	1975–76	Eredivisie	29	15								
PSV Eindhoven	1976–77	Eredivisie	18	5								
PSV Eindhoven	Total		153	81								
IFK Göteborg	1977	Allsvenskan	8	4	2	4	–		–		10	8
IFK Göteborg	1978	Allsvenskan	17	6	4	2	–		–		21	8
IFK Göteborg	1979	Allsvenskan	12	4	2	1	–		–		14	5
IFK Göteborg	Total		37	14	8	7	–		–		45	21
Standard Liège	1979–80	First Division	31	18								
Standard Liège	1980–81	First Division	20	9								
Standard Liège	Total		51	27								
Monaco	1981–82	Division 1	35	15								
Monaco	1982–83	Division 1	14	1								
Monaco	Total		49	16								
Örgryte	1983	Allsvenskan	0	0								
Örgryte	1984	Allsvenskan	0	0								
Örgryte	1985	Allsvenskan	0	0								
Örgryte	Total		0	0								
Total			350	156								

=== International ===
Appearances and goals by national team and year
National team	Year	Apps	Goals
Sweden	1972	4	8
Sweden	1973	9	1
Sweden	1974	9	4
Sweden	1975	5	2
Sweden	1976	2	0
Sweden	1977	2	0
Sweden	1978	4	0
Sweden	1980	5	0
Total		40	15

Scores and results list Sweden's goal tally first, score column indicates score after each Edström goal.

List of international goals scored by Ralf Edström
No.	Date	Venue	Opponent	Score	Result	Competition	Ref.
1	6 August 1972	Råsunda Stadium, Solna, Sweden	Soviet Union	1–0	4–4	Friendly	
2	6 August 1972	Råsunda Stadium, Solna, Sweden	Soviet Union	2–3	4–4	Friendly	
3	6 August 1972	Råsunda Stadium, Solna, Sweden	Soviet Union	4–4	4–4	Friendly	
4	17 September 1972	Ullevaal Stadion, Oslo, Norway	Norway	1–0	3–1	1972–77 Nordic Football Championship	
5	17 September 1972	Ullevaal Stadion, Oslo, Norway	Norway	3–1	3–1	1972–77 Nordic Football Championship	
6	15 October 1972	Ullevi, Gothenburg, Sweden	Malta	1–0	7–0	1974 FIFA World Cup qualifier	
7	15 October 1972	Ullevi, Gothenburg, Sweden	Malta	3–0	7–0	1974 FIFA World Cup qualifier	
8	15 October 1972	Ullevi, Gothenburg, Sweden	Malta	7–0	7–0	1974 FIFA World Cup qualifier	
9	13 June 1973	Nepstadion, Budapest, Hungary	Hungary	3–3	3–3	1974 FIFA World Cup qualifier	
10	23 June 1974	Rheinstadion, Düsseldorf, Germany	Uruguay	1–0	3–0	1974 FIFA World Cup	
11	23 June 1974	Rheinstadion, Düsseldorf, Germany	Uruguay	3–0	3–0	1974 FIFA World Cup	
12	30 June 1974	Rheinstadion, Düsseldorf, Germany	West Germany	1–0	2–4	1974 FIFA World Cup	
13	3 July 1974	Rheinstadion, Düsseldorf, Germany	Yugoslavia	1–1	1–1	1974 FIFA World Cup	
14	19 May 1975	Örjans Vall, Halmstad, Sweden	Algeria	1–0	4–0	Friendly	
15	4 June 1975	Råsunda Stadium, Solna, Sweden	Yugoslavia	1–0	1–2	UEFA Euro 1976 qualifier	

== Honours ==
Åtvidabergs FF

- Allsvenskan: 1972, 1973
- Svenska Cupen: 1970–71

PSV Eindhoven

- Eredivisie: 1974–75, 1975–76
- KNVB Cup: 1973–74, 1975–76

IFK Göteborg

- Svenska Cupen: 1978–79

Standard Liege

- Belgian Cup: 1981

AS Monaco

- French Division 1: 1981–82

Individual

- Allsvenskan top scorer: 1972
- Guldbollen: 1972, 1974
- World Soccer World XI: 1975
- Sport Ideal European XI: 1975
- Swedish Football Hall of Fame: 2003
