= Harry Lubse =

Dutch former footballer (born 1951)

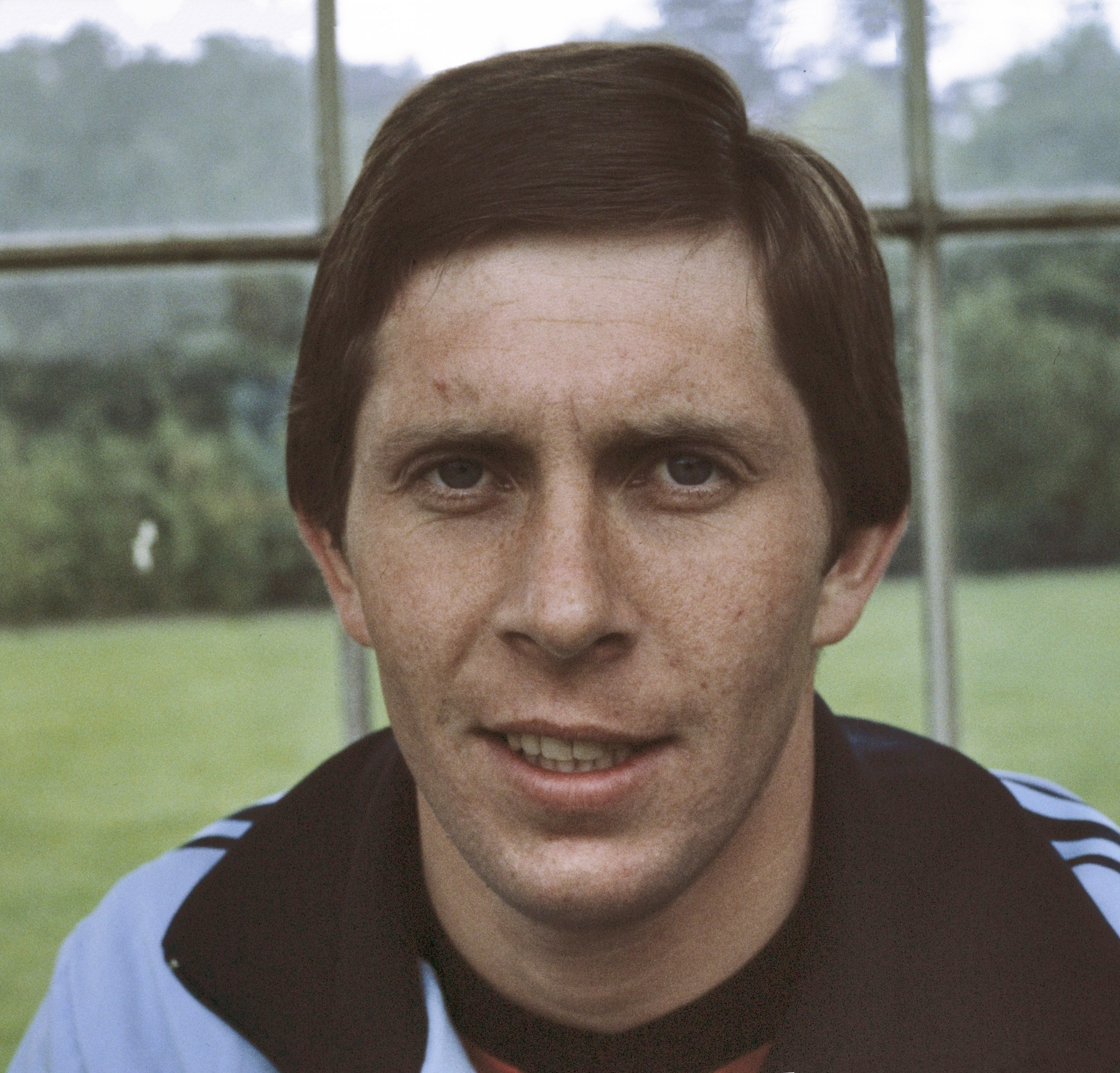
- Harry Lubse in 1978

Personal information
- Full name: Henricus Carolus Gerardus Lubse
- Date of birth: 23 September 1951 (age 75)
- Place of birth: Eindhoven, Netherlands
- Position: Striker

Senior career*
Years	Team	Apps	(Gls)
1968–1980	PSV Eindhoven	254	(81)
1980	Beerschot	9	(1)
1981–1984	Helmond Sport	120	(34)
1984–1985	Vitesse Arnhem	28	(6)

International career
1975	Netherlands	1	(1)
Medal record
Representing Netherlands
FIFA World Cup
Runner-up	1978 Argentina
- * Club domestic league appearances and goals

Henricus ("Harry") Carolus Gerardus Lubse (born 23 September 1951 in Eindhoven, North Brabant) is a retired football striker from the Netherlands, who obtained one international cap for the Netherlands national team. He did so on 3 September 1975 in the Euro Qualifier against Finland, when Holland won 4–1 with one goal from the PSV Eindhoven forward. He represented his native country at the 1978 FIFA World Cup, although Lubse did not play in Argentina. Later moving from PSV he played for Helmond Sport.
