= 1994–95 PSV Eindhoven season =

PSV Eindhoven
1994–95 season
- Manager: Aad de Mos (until October); Kees Rijvers (caretaker); Dick Advocaat (from December)
- Stadium: Philips Stadion
- Eredivisie: 3rd
- KNVB Cup: Round of 16
- UEFA Cup: First round
- Top goalscorer: League: Ronaldo (30); All: Ronaldo (35)
Home colours

During the 1994–95 Dutch football season, PSV Eindhoven competed in the Eredivisie.

== Squad ==
Squad at end of season

Note: Flags indicate national team as defined under FIFA eligibility rules; some limited exceptions apply. Players may hold more than one non-FIFA nationality.

No.	Pos.	Nation	Player
—	GK	NED	Stanley Menzo
—	GK	NED	Ronald Waterreus
—	DF	NED	Wilfred Bouma
—	DF	NED	Jürgen Dirkx
—	DF	NED	Ernest Faber
—	DF	NED	Arthur Numan (captain)
—	DF	THA	Geoffrey Prommayon
—	DF	NED	Stan Valckx
—	DF	NED	Jan Wouters
—	MF	NED	Björn van der Doelen
—	MF	NED	Peter Hoekstra

No.	Pos.	Nation	Player
—	MF	NED	Robert Fuchs
—	MF	NED	René Klomp
—	MF	NED	Edward Linskens
—	MF	NED	Patrick Paauwe
—	MF	NED	Boudewijn Pahlplatz
—	MF	BEL	Tom Van Mol
—	MF	NED	Marciano Vink
—	MF	NED	Boudewijn Zenden
—	FW	NED	Erik Meijer
10	FW	BEL	Luc Nilis
9	FW	BRA	Ronaldo

=== Left club during season ===
Note: Flags indicate national team as defined under FIFA eligibility rules; some limited exceptions apply. Players may hold more than one non-FIFA nationality.

No.	Pos.	Nation	Player
—	DF	ROU	Gheorghe Popescu (to Tottenham Hotspur)
—	DF	NED	Mitchell van der Gaag (to Motherwell)

No.	Pos.	Nation	Player
—	MF	BRA	Vampeta (on loan to VVV)

== Transfers ==
=== In ===
- (Netherlands) Ernest Faber – (Netherlands) FC Groningen (loan return)
- (Netherlands) René Klomp – (Netherlands) Sparta (loan return)
- (Thailand) Geoffrey Prommayon – (Netherlands) FC Eindhoven (loan return)
- (Netherlands) Stanley Menzo – (Netherlands) Ajax
- (Netherlands) Ronald Waterreus – (Netherlands) Roda JC
- (Belgium) Luc Nilis – (Belgium) Anderlecht
- (Netherlands) Boudewijn Pahlplatz – (Netherlands) FC Twente
- (Brazil) Ronaldo – (Brazil) Cruzeiro
- (Brazil) Vampeta – (Brazil) Vitória
- (Netherlands) Marciano Vink – (Italy) Genoa
- (Netherlands) Stan Valckx – (Portugal) Sporting CP, October 1994

=== Out ===
- (Ghana) Nii Lamptey – (Belgium) Anderlecht (loan return)
- (Netherlands) Hans van Breukelen – retired
- (Netherlands) Berry van Aerle – (Netherlands) Helmond Sport
- (Netherlands) Adri van Tiggelen – (Netherlands) Dordrecht'90
- (Zambia) Kalusha Bwalya – (Mexico) Club América
- (Netherlands) Jerry de Jong – (France) Caen
- (Netherlands) Erwin Koeman – (Netherlands) FC Groningen
- (Netherlands) Wim de Ron – (Netherlands) Cambuur Leeuwarden
- (Netherlands) Juul Ellerman – (Netherlands) FC Twente
- (Denmark) Jan Heintze – (Germany) Bayer Uerdingen
- (Sweden) Klas Ingesson – (England) Sheffield Wednesday
- (Denmark) Thomas Thorninger – (Denmark) AGF
- (Netherlands) Edwin van Ankeren – (Belgium) Eendracht Aalst
- (Romania) Gheorghe Popescu – (England) Tottenham Hotspur, September 1994
- (Netherlands) Mitchell van der Gaag – (Scotland) Motherwell, January 1995
- (Brazil) Vampeta – (Netherlands) VVV (loan), February 1995

== Competitions ==
=== Eredivisie ===
==== League table ====
Pos	Team	Pld	W	D	L	GF	GA	GD	Pts	Qualification or relegation
1	Ajax (C)	34	27	7	0	106	28	+78	61	Qualification to Champions League group stage
2	Roda JC	34	22	10	2	70	28	+42	54	Qualification to UEFA Cup first round
3	PSV	34	20	7	7	85	46	+39	47	Qualification to UEFA Cup first round
4	Feyenoord	34	19	5	10	66	56	+10	43 (Note: Winners KNVB Cup.)	Qualification to Cup Winners' Cup first round
5	FC Twente	34	17	8	9	66	50	+16	42	

Source: , RSSSF.com,
Rules for classification: 1) Points; 2) Head-to-head points; 3) Head-to-head goal difference; 4) Goal difference; 5) Goals scored; 6) Draw. (Note: Head-to-head record is used only after all the matches between the teams in question have been played).
(C) Champions

==== Matches ====
27 August 1994 1	Vitesse Arnhem	2–4	PSV Eindhoven	Arnhem
	Gillhaus 25'; Gillhaus 46' (pen.)	Report	Ronaldo 9'; Linskens 30'; Nilis 40'; Nilis 70'	Stadium: Nieuw Monnikenhuize

30 August 1994 2	PSV Eindhoven	4–1	Go Ahead Eagles	Eindhoven
	Ronaldo 1'; Ronaldo 48'; Hoekstra 58'; Nilis 81'	Report	Laferink 88'	Stadium: Philips Stadion

16 September 1994 3	PSV Eindhoven	4–0	Dordrecht'90	Eindhoven
	Hoekstra 36'; Vink 39'; Wouters 62'; Meijer 80'	Report		Stadium: Philips Stadion

20 September 1994 4	Sparta Rotterdam	1–1	PSV Eindhoven	Rotterdam
	van der Laan 19'	Report	Ronaldo 62'	Stadium: Stadion Spangen; Attendance: 5 000

30 September 1994 5	NEC	2–2	PSV Eindhoven	Nijmegen
	Janssen 7'; Kooistra 55'	Report	Numan 50'; Hoekstra 73'	Stadium: Stadion De Goffert; Attendance: 12 000

15 October 1994 6	PSV Eindhoven	3–1	sc Heerenveen	Eindhoven
	Nilis 60'; Meijer 83'; Ronaldo 90' (pen.)	Report	Polley 9'	Stadium: Philips Stadion; Attendance: 25 750; Referee: John Blankenstein

23 October 1994 7	PSV Eindhoven	1–4	AFC Ajax	Eindhoven
	Nilis 74'; Wouters (yellow card)	Report	de Boer 7'; Davids 14'; Seedorf 16' van Vossen 56'; Rijkaard (yellow card)	Stadium: Philips Stadion; Attendance: 27 000; Referee: Mario van der Ende

25 October 1994 8	Willem II	2–1	PSV Eindhoven	Tilburg
	Stewart 25'; Meijs 62'	Report	Meijer 70'	Stadium: Gemeentelijk Sportpark Tilburg; Attendance: 13 200; Referee: Herman van Dijk

28 October 1994 9	PSV Eindhoven	5–0	FC Groningen	Eindhoven
	Dirkx 41'; Ronaldo 55'; Linskens 63' de Jong 72' (o.g.); Numan 90'	Report		Stadium: Philips Stadion; Attendance: 23 900; Referee: Jaap Uilenberg

31 October 1994 10	Roda JC	3–0	PSV Eindhoven	Kerkrade
	Graef 55' van der Luer 62'; Derksen 82'	Report		Stadium: Sportpark Kaalheide; Attendance: 14 500; Referee: Jef van Vliet

5 November 1994 11	FC Utrecht	1–2	PSV Eindhoven	Utrecht
	Smit 35'	Report	Ronaldo 5'; Nilis 83'	Stadium: Nieuw Galgenwaard; Attendance: 13 500; Referee: Roelof Luinge

8 November 1994 12	PSV Eindhoven	4–0	MVV	Eindhoven
	Ronaldo 7'; Nilis 37'; Meijer 82'; Ronaldo 89'	Report		Stadium: Philips Stadion; Attendance: 25 200; Referee: Jan Wegereef

18 November 1994 13	FC Volendam	0–0	PSV Eindhoven	Volendam
		Report		Stadium: Veronicastadion; Attendance: 5 500

26 November 1994 14	PSV Eindhoven	4–1	Feyenoord	Eindhoven
	Nilis 10'; Ronaldo 15' (pen.); Prommayon (red card); Numan 67'; Ronaldo 88'	Report	Larsson 37'	Stadium: Philips Stadion; Attendance: 27500; Referee: Jaap Uilenberg

3 December 1994 15	FC Twente	2–2	PSV Eindhoven	Enschede
	Bosvelt 6'; Boerebach 63'	Report	Numan 74'; Meijer 89'	Stadium: Diekman; Attendance: 10 600; Referee: Roelof Luinge

5 December 1994 16	PSV Eindhoven	2–2	RKC Waalwijk	Eindhoven
	Zenden 8'; Zenden 81'	Report	Streppel 23'; Decheiver 88' (pen.)	Stadium: Philips Stadion; Attendance: 23 500; Referee: Jan Wegereef

21 January 1995 17	AFC Ajax	1–0	PSV Eindhoven	Amsterdam
	Kluivert 80' (pen.)	Report		Stadium: Olympisch Stadion; Attendance: 40000; Referee: Roelof Luinge

27 January 1995 18	PSV Eindhoven	5–0	Roda JC	Eindhoven
	Valckx 5'; Pahlplatz 16'; Ronaldo 40'; Zenden 66'; Ronaldo 68'	Report	Huiberts (red card)	Stadium: Philips Stadion; Attendance: 29 100; Referee: Mario van der Ende

2 February 1995 19	Dordrecht'90	0–2	PSV Eindhoven	Dordrecht
		Report	Ronaldo 2'; Meijer 46'	Stadium: Riwal Hoogwerkers Stadion; Attendance: 4 000; Referee: Jan Wegereef

10 February 1995 20	PSV Eindhoven	3–2	Vitesse Arnhem	Eindhoven
	Ronaldo 55'; Linskens 68'; Hoekstra 79'	Report	Latuheru 29'; Cocu 90'	Stadium: Philips Stadion; Attendance: 27 800; Referee: Dick Jol

14 February 1995 21	PSV Eindhoven	4–0	Sparta Rotterdam	Eindhoven
	Pahlplatz 7'; Ronaldo 12'; Ronaldo 23' (pen.); Pahlplatz 54'	Report	Kooiman (red card) 22'	Stadium: Philips Stadion; Attendance: 24 400; Referee: Hugo Luijten

18 February 1995 22	Go Ahead Eagles	1–1	PSV Eindhoven	Deventer
	Decheiver 86'	Report	Linskens 54'	Stadium: De Adelaarshorst; Attendance: 6225; Referee: Jaap Uilenberg

3 March 1995 23	PSV Eindhoven	3–0	NEC	Eindhoven
	Ronaldo 42'; Meijer 61'; Ronaldo 79'	Report		Stadium: Philips Stadion; Attendance: 24 600; Referee: John Blankenstein

6 March 1995 24	NAC Breda	1–2	PSV Eindhoven	Breda
	Arnold 66'	Report	Zenden 44'; Meijer 71'	Stadium: Rat Verlegh; Attendance: 10 850; Referee: Herman van Dijk

10 March 1995 25	sc Heerenveen	1–2	PSV Eindhoven	Heerenveen
	Echteld 83'	Report	Valckx 46'; Nilis 89'	Stadium: Abe Lenstra Stadion; Attendance: 13 500; Referee: Mario van der Ende

17 March 1995 26	PSV Eindhoven	3–2	Willem II	Eindhoven
	Nilis 26'; Ronaldo 42'; Latupeirissa 69' (o.g.)	Report	Feskens 13'; Sylla 18'	Stadium: Philips Stadion; Attendance: 27 300; Referee: Herman van Dijk

1 April 1995 27	FC Groningen	3–2	PSV Eindhoven	Groningen
	Sion 12'; Koeman 37'; Sion 60'	Report	Valckx 52'; Ronaldo 70'	Stadium: Oosterpark; Attendance: 14 300; Referee: John Blankenstein

8 April 1995 28	PSV Eindhoven	4–0	FC Utrecht	Eindhoven
	Ronaldo 51'; Ronaldo 71'; Ronaldo 87'; Meijer 88'	Report		Stadium: Philips Stadion; Attendance: 24 300; Referee: Jan Wegereef

13 April 1995 29	MVV	2–3	PSV Eindhoven	Maastricht
	Roelofsen 13'; Roelofsen 33'	Report	Faber 14'; Nilis 46'; Ronaldo 60'	Stadium: De Geusselt; Attendance: 8 800; Referee: Dick Jol

28 April 1995 30	PSV Eindhoven	1–1	FC Volendam	Eindhoven
	Numan 60'	Report	Smeets 36'	Stadium: Philips Stadion; Attendance: 24 600; Referee: Mario van der Ende

6 May 1995 31	Feyenoord	3–2	PSV Eindhoven	Rotterdam
	Obiku 20'; Kiprich 50' (pen.); Kiprich 70'	Report	Ronaldo 32'; Hoekstra 35' (yellow card); Valckx (red card) 49'	Stadium: De Kuip; Attendance: 27 639; Referee: Roelof Luinge

13 May 1995 32	PSV Eindhoven	3–1	FC Twente	Eindhoven
	Zenden 25'; Nilis 40'; Ronaldo 45'	Report	Boerebach 50' (yellow card)	Stadium: Philips Stadion; Attendance: 26 600; Referee: Dick Jol

20 May 1995 33	RKC Waalwijk	2–4	PSV Eindhoven	Waalwijk
	Schreuder 68'; Petrov 80'	Report	Hoekstra 3'; Numan 15'; Ronaldo 22'; Linskens 88'	Stadium: Sportpark Olympia; Attendance: 5 200; Referee: Jaap Uilenberg

27 May 1995 34	PSV Eindhoven	2–4	NAC Breda	Eindhoven
	Ronaldo 83'; Ronaldo 88'	Report	Remie 18'; Lammers 74' van Wonderen 80'; Arikan 89'	Stadium: Philips Stadion

=== KNVB beker ===
==== Round of 32 ====
5 October 1994	Roda JC	2–3 (a.e.t.)	PSV Eindhoven

==== Eightfinals ====
30 November 1994	PSV Eindhoven	0–1	sc Heerenveen

=== UEFA Cup ===
==== First round ====
13 September 1994	Bayer Leverkusen (Germany)	5–4	(Netherlands) PSV Eindhoven	Leverkusen
	Kirsten 5', 16', 41'; Dooley 14'; Schuster 73'	Report	Ronaldo 11'; Ronaldo 45'; Ronaldo 61'; Nilis 88'	Referee: (Hungary) László Vagner

27 September 1994	PSV Eindhoven (Netherlands)	0–0	(Germany) Bayer Leverkusen	Eindhoven
		Report		Referee: (England) Dermot Gallagher

== Statistics ==
=== Players statistics ===
No.	Pos	Nat	Player	Total		1994-95 Eredivisie		Cup	
No.	Pos	Nat	Player	Apps	Goals	Apps	Goals	Apps	Goals
	GK	(Netherlands) NED	Ronald Waterreus	20	0	20	0		
	DF	(Netherlands) NED	Arthur Numan	32	6	32	6		
	DF	(Thailand) THA	Geoffrey Prommayon	32	0	32	0		
	DF	(Netherlands) NED	Jürgen Dirkx	19	1	18+1	1		
	DF	(Netherlands) NED	Stan Valckx	27	3	27	3		
	MF	(Netherlands) NED	Edward Linskens	28	5	26+2	5		
	MF	(Netherlands) NED	Jan Wouters	22	1	22	1		
	MF	(Netherlands) NED	Boudewijn Pahlplatz	22	3	19+3	3		
	MF	(Netherlands) NED	Boudewijn Zenden	27	5	23+4	5		
	FW	(Belgium) BEL	Luc Nilis	30	12	30	12		
	FW	(Brazil) BRA	Ronaldo	33	30	33	30		
	GK	(Netherlands) NED	Stanley Menzo	14	0	14	0		
	DF	(Netherlands) NED	Ernest Faber	21	1	15+6	1		
	MF	(Netherlands) NED	Peter Hoekstra	19	6	14+5	6		
	MF	(Belgium) BEL	Tom Van Mol	16	0	12+4	0		
	FW	(Netherlands) NED	Erik Meijer	25	9	8+17	9		
	MF	(Netherlands) NED	Björn van der Doelen	9	0	6+3	0		
	MF	(Netherlands) NED	Marciano Vink	6	1	6	1		
	MF	(Netherlands) NED	Robert Fuchs	4	0	4	0		
	MF	(Romania) ROU	Gheorghe Popescu	2	0	2	0		
	MF	(Netherlands) NED	Patrick Paauwe	1	0	1	0		
	DF	(Netherlands) NED	Wilfred Bouma	1	0	0+1	0		
