= 1995–96 PSV Eindhoven season =

PSV Eindhoven
1995–96 season
- Manager: Dick Advocaat
- Stadium: Philips Stadion
- Eredivisie: 2nd
- KNVB Cup: Winners (In 1996-97 UEFA Cup Winners' Cup)
- UEFA Cup: Quarter-finals
- Top goalscorer: Luc Nilis (21)
Home colours	Away colours

During the 1995–96 Dutch football season, PSV Eindhoven competed in its 40th Eredivisie tournament.

== Season summary ==
PSV finished the season in second with 6 points behind Ajax, one better than last season, with ten more points (once adjusting for the switch to three-points-for-a-win). The club also made its deepest run in Europe since winning the European Cup at the turn of the decade, with a 7–1 thrashing off Finnish team MyPa and a 5–3 victory at Leeds among the highlights as PSV reached the quarter-finals. A 2–2 draw at Spanish giants Barcelona gave the Dutch club a foundation for a second-leg triumph, but a late Barcelona goal gave the Catalans the victory on the night and a semi-final berth.

== First-team squad ==
Squad at end of season

Note: Flags indicate national team as defined under FIFA eligibility rules; some limited exceptions apply. Players may hold more than one non-FIFA nationality.

No.	Pos.	Nation	Player
—	GK	(Netherlands) NED	Stanley Menzo (Note: Menzo was born in Paramaribo, Suriname, but also qualified to represent the Netherlands internationally and made his international debut for the Netherlands in 1989.)
—	GK	(Netherlands) NED	Ronald Waterreus
—	DF	(Netherlands) NED	Wilfred Bouma
—	DF	(Netherlands) NED	Ernest Faber
—	DF	(Netherlands) NED	Ferry Maas
—	DF	(Netherlands) NED	Arthur Numan (captain)
—	DF	(Netherlands) NED	Jaap Stam
—	DF	(Netherlands) NED	Stan Valckx
—	DF	(Netherlands) NED	Chris van der Weerden
—	DF	(Thailand) THA	Geoffrey Prommayon
—	MF	(Netherlands) NED	Phillip Cocu
—	MF	(Netherlands) NED	Wim Jonk

No.	Pos.	Nation	Player
—	MF	(Netherlands) NED	René Klomp
—	MF	(Netherlands) NED	Edward Linskens
—	MF	(Netherlands) NED	Björn van der Doelen
—	MF	(Netherlands) NED	Tommie van der Leegte
—	MF	(Netherlands) NED	Marciano Vink (Note: Vink was born in Paramaribo, Suriname, but also qualified to represent the Netherlands internationally and made his international debut for the Netherlands in 1991.)
—	MF	(Netherlands) NED	Jan Wouters
—	MF	(Netherlands) NED	Boudewijn Zenden
—	FW	(Netherlands) NED	René Eijkelkamp
—	FW	(Netherlands) NED	Boudewijn Pahlplatz
—	FW	(Belgium) BEL	Luc Nilis
—	FW	(Iceland) ISL	Eiður Guðjohnsen
—	FW	(Brazil) BRA	Ronaldo

=== Left club during season ===
Note: Flags indicate national team as defined under FIFA eligibility rules; some limited exceptions apply. Players may hold more than one non-FIFA nationality.

No.	Pos.	Nation	Player
—	MF	(Netherlands) NED	Peter Hoekstra (to Ajax)

== Transfers ==
=== Out ===
- (Netherlands) Erik Meijer – (Germany) KFC Uerdingen
- (Netherlands) Patrick Paauwe – (Netherlands) De Graafschap
- (Netherlands) Peter Hoekstra – (Netherlands) Ajax

=== Loan out ===
- (Netherlands) Jürgen Dirkx – (Netherlands) Fortuna Sittard, season
- (Brazil) Vampeta – (Brazil) Fluminense, season

== Competitions ==
=== Eredivisie ===
==== League table ====
Pos	Team	Pld	W	D	L	GF	GA	GD	Pts	Qualification or relegation
1	Ajax (C)	34	26	5	3	97	24	+73	83	Qualification to Champions League group stage
2	PSV (Note: Winners KNVB Cup.)	34	24	5	5	97	25	+72	77	Qualification to Cup Winners' Cup first round
3	Feyenoord	34	18	9	7	66	36	+30	63	Qualification to UEFA Cup first round
4	Roda JC	34	15	12	7	51	35	+16	57	Qualification to UEFA Cup first round
5	Vitesse Arnhem	34	15	8	11	48	44	+4	53	

(C) Champions

==== Results by round ====
Round	1	2	3	4	5	6	7	8	9	10	11	12	13	14	15	16	17	18	19	20	21	22	23	24	25	26	27	28	29	30	31	32	33	34
Ground	A	A	H	A	H	A	H	A	H	H	A	H	A	H	A	H	H	A	H	A	H	A	H	A	H	A	A	A	H	H	A	H	A	H
Result	W	L	W	W	W	W	W	D	W	W	W	W	D	W	W	L	W	W	W	W	W	D	W	W	D	L	L	W	W	D	W	W	L	W
Position	2	4	6	4	3	3	2	2	2	2	2	2	2	2	2	2	2	2	2	2	2	2	2	1	2	2	2	2	2	2	2	2	2	2

Source: Competitive matches
A = Away; H = Home; W = Win; D = Draw; L = Loss; = Leader, 1996–97 UEFA Champions League Group stage; = 1996–97 UEFA Cup; = 1996–97 UEFA Cup; = 1996–97 UEFA Cup

==== Matches ====
18 August 1995 1	Fortuna Sittard	1–3	PSV
20:00 CET	Hamming 41'		31' Hoekstra; 56' Nilis; 60' Cocu	Attendance: 11 000

27 August 1995 2	NAC Breda	3–0	PSV
14:30 CET	Abdellaoui 20'; Remie 69'; Arnold 88'			Attendance: 10 100

9 September 1995 3	PSV	5–1	SC Heerenveen	Eindhoven
19:30 CET	Ronaldo 25'; Pahlplatz 44'; Ronaldo 70'; Eijkelkamp 82'; Nilis 89'		78' Tammer	Stadium: Philips Stadion; Attendance: 27 500

16 September 1995 4	Vitesse Arnhem	0–1	PSV Eindhoven	Arnhem
19:30 CET			38' Pahlplatz	Attendance: 8 350

20 September 1995 5	PSV Eindhoven	3–0	FC Twente	Eindhoven
	Ronaldo 39'; Faber 48'; Ronaldo 75'			Stadium: Philips Stadion; Attendance: 24 850

23 September 1995 6	FC Volendam	0–5	PSV Eindhoven
			14' Ronaldo; 29' Numan; 36' Pahlplatz; 47'Cocu; 88' Jonk

1 October 1995 7	PSV Eindhoven	3–0	Feyenoord	Eindhoven
18:00 CET	Ronaldo 50'; Jonk 70' van der Weerden 86'			Stadium: Philips Stadion; Attendance: 27 500

4 October 1995 8	Roda JC	1–1	PSV
	Roelofsen 68'		79' Cocu

14 October 1995 9	PSV	4–0	RKC Waalwijk	Eindhoven
19:30 CET	Eijkelkamp 2'; Eijkelkamp 54'; Cocu 68'; Nilis 90'			Stadium: Philips Stadion; Attendance: 24 300

21 October 1995 10	PSV	7–1	FC Groningen	Eindhoven
19:30 CET	Eijkelkamp 13'; Zenden 33'; Zenden 49'; Nilis 53'; Zenden 64'; Nilis 84'; Pahlplatz 90'		24' de Kruyff	Stadium: Philips Stadion; Attendance: 24 500

24 October 1995 11	FC Utrecht	1–4	PSV Eindhoven	Utrecht
19:30 CET	Graanoogst 5'		43' Valckx; 56' Nilis; 70' Jonk; 79' Cocu	Attendance: 9 500

28 October 1995 12	PSV	2–0	Willem II	Eindhoven
19:30 CET	Faber 8'; Nilis 86'			Stadium: Philips Stadion; Attendance: 26 800

5 November 1995 13	Ajax	1–1	PSV Eindhoven	Amsterdam
18:00 CET	Kanu 34'		32' Ronaldo	Attendance: 42 000

18 November 1995 14	PSV	8–0	De Graafschap	Eindhoven
19:30 CET	Jonk 5'; Ronaldo 30'; Ronaldo 57'; Cocu 59'; Eijkelkamp 67'; Hoekstra 73'; Cocu 84'			Stadium: Philips Stadion; Attendance: 25 600

26 November 1995 15	NEC Nijmegen	0–5	PSV
14:30 CET			47' Ronaldo; 59' Ronaldo; 67' Hoekstra; 76' Nilis; 86' Cocu	Attendance: 10 500

2 December 1995 16	PSV	1–2	Sparta Rotterdam	Eindhoven
19:30 CET	Nilis 10'		33' van der Laan; 67' de Nooijer	Stadium: Philips Stadion; Attendance: 24 500

16 December 1995 17	PSV	3–0	Fortuna Sittard	Eindhoven
19:30 CET	Hoekstra 61'; Hoekstra 84'; Numan 88'			Stadium: Philips Stadion; Attendance: 23 800

20 December 1995	Go Ahead Eagles	0–5	PSV
19:30 CET			29' Nilis; 45' Nilis; 46' Eijkelkamp; 50' Wouters; 78' Hoekstra	Attendance: 8 000

16 January 1996 19	PSV	4–1	NAC Breda	Eindhoven
12:00 CET	Pahlplatz 5'; Nilis 33'; Nilis 80' van der Leegte 81'		52' van Wonderen	Stadium: Philips Stadion; Attendance: 25 500

19 January 1996 20	SC Heerenveen	1–3	PSV	Heerenveen
19:30 CET	Regtop 51'		1' Zenden; 45' Jonk; 75' Wouters	Attendance: 13 500

10 February 1996 21	PSV	7–0	FC Volendam	Eindhoven
12:00 CET	Wouters 2'; Cocu 14'; Eijkelkamp 17'; Nilis 41'; Nilis 73'; Gudjohnsen 82'; Cocu 86'			Stadium: Philips Stadion; Attendance: 23 200

25 February 1996 22	Feyenoord	0–0	PSV
19:30 CET				Attendance: 28 052

2 March 1996 23	PSV	3–0	Roda JC	Eindhoven
12:00 CET	Senden 3' (o.g.); Nilis 41' van der Doelen 71'			Stadium: Philips Stadion; Attendance: 26 500

8 March 1996 24	RKC Waalwijk	1–3	PSV
12:00 CET	Petrovic 22'		10'Nilis; Stam 40'; Vink 45'	Attendance: 4 800

16 March 1996 25	PSV	0–0	FC Utrecht	Eindhoven
12:00 CET				Stadium: Philips Stadion; Attendance: 26 300

24 March 1996 26	FC Groningen	1–0	PSV	Groningen
12:00 CET	Veenhof 76'			Attendance: 12 725

27 March 1996 27	FC Twente	3–2	PSV	Twente
12:00 CET	Bosvelt 2'; Bruggink 7'; Bruggink 77'		18' Eijkelkamp; 27' Eijkelkamp	Attendance: 7 000

30 March 1996 28	Willem II Tilburg	2–5	PSV
19:30 CET	de Gier 16'; 39'		10' Nilis; 28' Zenden; 33' Zenden; 53' Nilis; 81' Gudjohnsen	Attendance: 11 900

6 April 1996 29	PSV	1–0	Vitesse Arnhem	Eindhoven
12:00 CET	Eijkelkamp 26'			Stadium: Philips Stadion

8 April 1996 30	PSV	1–1	Ajax Amsterdam	Eindhoven
12:00 CET	Nilis 40'		54' (o.g.) Hoekstra	Stadium: Philips Stadion; Attendance: 27 500

11 April 1996 31	De Graafschap	1–2	PSV
19:30 CET	Viscaal 48'		14' Jonk; 88' Vink	Attendance: 9 000

20 April 1996 32	PSV	1–0	NEC Nijmegen	Eindhoven
12:00 CET	Gudjohnsen 37'			Stadium: Philips Stadion; Attendance: 26 000

28 April 1996 33	Sparta Rotterdam	2–1	PSV	Rotterdam
12:00 CET	Jalink 61'; Groenendijk 76'		83' Cocu	Attendance: 6 500

5 May 1996 34	PSV	3–1	Go Ahead Eagles	Eindhoven
12:300 CET	Zenden 20'; Cocu 54'; Nilis 73'		17' Rorije	Stadium: Philips Stadion; Attendance: 27 800

=== KNVB Cup ===
==== Final ====
16 May 1996	PSV	5–2	Sparta	De Kuip, Rotterdam
	Cocu 7'; Vink 14'; Veldman 65' (o.g.); Jonk 87'; Van der Doelen 90'		Van der Meer 45'; De Nooijer 79' (pen.)	Attendance: 35,000; Referee: Mario van der Ende

=== UEFA Cup ===
==== First round ====
12 September 1995	MyPa (Finland)	1–1	(Netherlands) PSV	Lahti
	Mahlio 29'	Report	Ronaldo 50'

26 September 1995	PSV (Netherlands)	7–1	(Finland) MyPa	Eindhoven
	Ronaldo 15', 45', 73', 81'; Jonk 57', 71'; Hoekstra 66'	Report	Keskitalo 16'

PSV won 8–2 on aggregate.

==== Second round ====
13 October 1995	Leeds United (England)	3–5	(Netherlands) PSV Eindhoven	Leeds
	Speed 5'; Palmer 48'; McAllister 72'	Report	Eijkelkamp 11'; Vink 35'; Jonk 39'; Nilis 83', 88'

31 October 1995	PSV Eindhoven (Netherlands)	3–0	(England) Leeds United	Eindhoven
	Cocu 11', 74'; Pemberton 74' (o.g.)	Report

PSV won 3–8 on aggregate.

==== Third round ====
21 November 1995	PSV (Netherlands)	2–1	(Germany) Werder Bremen	Eindhoven
	Ronaldo 9' (pen.); Nilis 84'	Report	Bode 55'

5 December 1995	Werder Bremen (Germany)	0–0	(Netherlands) PSV	Bremen
		Report

PSV won 2–1 on aggregate.

==== Quarter-finals ====
5 March 1996	Barcelona (Spain)	2–2	(Netherlands) PSV	Camp Nou, Barcelona
21:00	Bakero 21'; Abelardo 70'	Report	Nilis 4', 50'	Attendance: 90,000; Referee: Anders Frisk (Sweden)

19 March 1996	PSV (Netherlands)	2–3	(Spain) Barcelona	Philips Stadion, Eindhoven
20:30	Zenden 43'; Eijkelkamp 65'	Report	Bakero 3'; Figo 22'; Sergi 80'	Attendance: 30,000; Referee: Nikolai Levnikov (Russia)

Barcelona won 5–4 on aggregate.

== Statistics ==
=== Players statistics ===
No.	Pos	Nat	Player	Total		1995-96 Eredivisie		Cup		1995-96 UEFA Cup	
No.	Pos	Nat	Player	Apps	Goals	Apps	Goals	Apps	Goals	Apps	Goals
	GK	(Netherlands) NED	Waterreus	33	0	33	0				
	DF	(Netherlands) NED	van der Weerden	27	1	27	1				
	DF	(Netherlands) NED	Faber	23	2	23	2				
	DF	(Netherlands) NED	Valckx	31	1	30+1	1				
	DF	(Netherlands) NED	Numan	27	2	27	2				
	MF	(Netherlands) NED	Cocu	31	12	29+2	12				
	MF	(Netherlands) NED	Jonk	29	6	28+1	6				
	MF	(Netherlands) NED	Wouters	20	3	20	3				
	MF	(Netherlands) NED	Zenden	25	7	16+9	7				
	FW	(Belgium) BEL	Nilis	31	21	31	21				
	FW	(Netherlands) NED	Eijkelkamp	27	10	20+7	10				
	GK	(Suriname) SUR	Menzo	1	0	1	0				
	MF	(Suriname) SUR	Vink	23	2	19+4	2				
	DF	(Netherlands) NED	Stam	14	1	14	1				
	FW	(Netherlands) NED	Pahlplatz	20	5	11+9	5				
	FW	(Brazil) BRA	Ronaldo	13	12	10+3	12				
	MF	(Netherlands) NED	van der Leegte	12	1	7+5	1				
	MF	(Netherlands) NED	Linskens	10	0	7+3	0				
	FW	(Iceland) ISL	Gudjohnsen	13	3	6+7	3				
	MF	(Netherlands) NED	van der Doelen	11	1	5+6	1				
	DF	(Thailand) THA	Prommayon	6	0	3+3	0				
	MF	(Netherlands) NED	Klomp	2	0	1+1	0				
	DF	(Netherlands) NED	Bouma	4	0	0+4	0				
	DF	(Netherlands) NED	Maas	1	0	0+1	0				
