= 1998 Johan Cruyff Shield =

Johan Cruijff Schaal III
Ajax	PSV Eindhoven
0	2
- Date: 16 August 1998
- Venue: Amsterdam Arena, Amsterdam
- Referee: Mario van der Ende
- Attendance: 39,500

The third edition of the Johan Cruyff Shield (Dutch: Johan Cruijff Schaal) was held on 16 August 1998 between Ajax, who had won both the 1997–98 Eredivisie and the 1997–98 KNVB Cup, and PSV Eindhoven, who had finished as runners-up in the 1997–98 Eredivisie (and, coincidentally, also in the 1997–98 KNVB Cup). PSV won the match 2–0.

== Match ==
=== Details ===
16 August 1998

Ajax	0–2	PSV Eindhoven
		Khokhlov 32'; Bruggink 53'

Amsterdam Arena, Amsterdam
Attendance: 39,500
Referee: Mario van der Ende

Ajax	PSV Eindhoven

GK	1	(Netherlands) Edwin van der Sar
RB	19	(Netherlands) Mario Melchiot
CB	3	(Netherlands) Danny Blind (c)	(yellow card) 40'	(substituted off) 46'
CB	15	(Nigeria) Sunday Oliseh
LB	2	(Denmark) Ole Tobiasen
CM	14	(Portugal) Dani
CM	22	(Netherlands) Peter Hoekstra
AM	10	(Finland) Jari Litmanen		(substituted off) 74'
RW	25	(Brazil) Wamberto
CF	24	(Georgia (country)) Shota Arveladze
LW	11	(Georgia (country)) Georgi Kinkladze
Substitutes:
MF	18	(Poland) Andrzej Rudy		(substituted in) 46'
MF	8	(Netherlands) Richard Witschge		(substituted in) 74'
Manager:
(Denmark) Morten Olsen

GK	23	(Netherlands) Ronald Waterreus	(yellow card) 85'
RB	21	(Netherlands) Theo Lucius		(substituted off) 82'
CB	7	(Portugal) Abel Xavier
CB	17	(Brazil) Marcos
LB	28	(Brazil) Jorginho
RM	19	(Poland) Tomasz Iwan
CM	3	(Russia) Yuriy Nikiforov (c)
CM	20	(Russia) Dmitri Khokhlov		(substituted off) 90'
LM	11	(Finland) Joonas Kolkka
CF	12	(Netherlands) Arnold Bruggink	(yellow card) 38'	(substituted off) 76'
CF	8	(Netherlands) Ruud van Nistelrooy
Substitutes:
FW	9	(Belgium) Gilles De Bilde		(substituted in) 76'
DF	4	(Netherlands) Stan Valckx		(substituted in) 82'
MF	32	(Netherlands) Björn van der Doelen		(substituted in) 90'
Manager:
(England) Bobby Robson
