= Boudewijn Zenden =

Dutch footballer (born 1976)

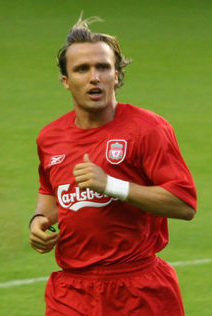
- Zenden playing for Liverpool in 2005

Personal information
- Full name: Boudewijn Zenden
- Date of birth: 15 August 1976 (age 50)
- Place of birth: Maastricht, Netherlands
- Height: 1.73 m (5 ft 8 in)
- Position: Midfielder

Youth career
- 1985–1987: MVV
- 1987–1993: PSV

Senior career*
Years	Team	Apps	(Gls)
1993–1998	PSV	112	(32)
1998–2001	Barcelona	64	(2)
2001–2004	Chelsea	43	(4)
2003–2004	→ Middlesbrough (loan)	31	(4)
2004–2005	Middlesbrough	36	(5)
2005–2007	Liverpool	23	(2)
2007–2009	Marseille	54	(6)
2009–2011	Sunderland	47	(4)
Total		410	(59)

International career
1997–2004	Netherlands	54	(7)

Managerial career
- 2012–2013: Chelsea (assistant manager)
- 2013–2015: Jong PSV (assistant manager)
Medal record
Men's football
Representing Netherlands
UEFA European Championship
Bronze medal – third place	2000 Belgium-Netherlands
Bronze medal – third place	2004 Portugal
- * Club domestic league appearances and goals

Boudewijn Zenden (Dutch pronunciation: [ˈbʌudəʋɛin ˈzɛndə(n)]; born 15 August 1976) also known by his nickname Bolo, is a Dutch former professional footballer who played as a left winger or as an attacking midfielder.

Named the 1997 Dutch Football Talent of the Year, Zenden played for four teams in the English Premier League, totalling 180 games and 19 goals. He also played in the highest leagues in the Netherlands, Spain and France, for PSV, Barcelona and Marseille respectively. Internationally, Zenden earned 54 caps and scored seven goals for the Netherlands, whom he represented at two UEFA European Championships and the 1998 FIFA World Cup.

== Early life ==
Zenden was born in Maastricht, Limburg. His father Pierre Zenden is a former judoka who worked as a sports broadcaster for the public NOS broadcasting system from 1968 to 2005. Zenden played football and was also competitive in judo as a child. In 1985, Dutch club MVV Maastricht signed Zenden after watching him play for amateur club Leonidas. Two years later, he joined the youth academy of PSV.

Zenden earned his judo black belt at age 14 and was three times judo champion of his home province of Limburg. Zenden has been a strict vegetarian since age 19.

== Club career ==
=== PSV ===
As his career developed at PSV, Zenden made the left wing position his own, displacing Peter Hoekstra and finally becoming a firm member of the starting line-up after the departure of Dutch national team player Jan Wouters. Zenden was an important part of the PSV team that won the Eredivisie championship in 1996–97, where he also received the 1997 Dutch Talent of the Year award. After another season at PSV, in which he scored 12 goals in 23 games, he moved to Spanish club Barcelona in 1998.

=== Barcelona ===
At Barcelona, Zenden became part of a large contingent of Dutch players under Barcelona's Dutch coach Louis van Gaal. He found his first-team opportunities at Barcelona limited by the form of fellow Dutchman Marc Overmars, however, who played in Zenden's favoured left wing position for both club and country. Instead, Zenden was deployed as a left wing-back, a defensive role which he took on successfully, as he displaced Spanish international and local favourite Sergi. Zenden helped Barcelona win the 1998–99 La Liga championship, and in the 1999–2000 season, he scored his only three goals for the club. After Van Gaal's resignation as coach in 2000, however, first team appearances became more scarce for Zenden. At the end of the 2000–01 season, English club Chelsea bought him for £7.5 million.

=== Chelsea ===
Zenden scored nine minutes into his Chelsea debut against Newcastle United. In his two years at Chelsea, Zenden played in the 2002 FA Cup final, a 2–0 defeat to Arsenal; however, he struggled to maintain a constant place in the starting line-up mainly due to persistent injuries.

=== Middlesbrough ===
Zenden was loaned out to Middlesbrough for the 2003–04 season. Here he found playing success, as he scored the winning goal in the 2004 League Cup final against Bolton Wanderers to secure Middlesbrough their first major trophy in club history. When his contract with Chelsea expired in the summer 2004, he moved to Middlesbrough on a free transfer, signing a one-year contract for the 2004–05 season. He was deployed in a central midfield position, where he played 36 of 38 league games, scoring five goals in the process, and was voted the Middlesbrough fans' 2005 Player of the Year. However, it would be his last for Middlesbrough, as he left in the summer of 2005 when his contract ran out.

=== Liverpool ===
Zenden joined newly crowned UEFA Champions League champions Liverpool on 4 July 2005. He started his Liverpool career being used regularly as a left midfielder, and was in the starting line-up as Liverpool won the 2005 UEFA Super Cup. However, he suffered a serious cruciate ligament injury in his right knee in December 2005, which ruled him out for the rest of the season. He recovered for the start of the 2006–07 season and was part of the Liverpool team that won the 2006 FA Community Shield. After the departure of German central midfielder Dietmar Hamann in the summer of 2006, Liverpool manager Rafael Benítez indicated that he saw Zenden as an option in the central midfield. Zenden suffered a further knee injury playing against Manchester City on 25 November 2006, for which he underwent corrective surgery. Zenden played in both legs of Liverpool's Champions League semi-final against former club Chelsea, scoring Liverpool's first penalty in the penalty shootout at the end of the second leg, which Liverpool won 4–1. He went on to start in the final, which Liverpool lost to Milan. Zenden scored twice during his spell at Liverpool with goals against West Ham United and Portsmouth in the Premier League.

=== Marseille ===
On 24 May 2007, it was announced by Liverpool manager Rafael Benítez that Zenden's contract would not be renewed and that he was allowed to talk to other clubs, and on 6 July 2007, Zenden signed a two-year contract with Marseille. He made his competitive debut for Marseille on 11 August 2007, starting and eventually being substituted in a 0–0 stalemate with Rennes. At Marseille, Zenden struggled for regular football. In the 2008–09 Ligue 1 season, he featured 13 times (predominately as a substitute) scoring three goals.

After being released, Zenden revealed that he wanted to end his career in England, with Blackburn Rovers and Portsmouth interested in the player. In October 2009, he went to Sunderland on trial. He signed after impressing Sunderland manager Steve Bruce.

=== Sunderland ===
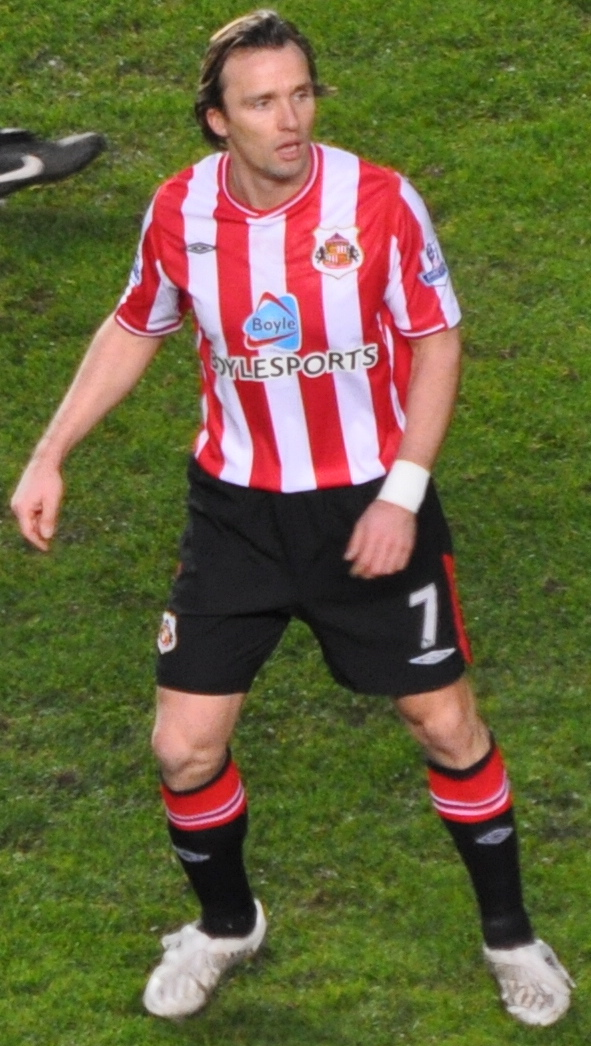
Zenden playing for Sunderland in 2010

In October 2009, Zenden signed a contract with Sunderland which tied him down until the end of the 2009–10 season. Zenden signed in time to make his debut against former club Liverpool and he did an excellent job helping Sunderland to retain their one-goal lead after coming on as a substitute for the injured Lee Cattermole. His Sunderland career often saw him play as a substitute without starting any matches and he had suffered an injury in between, but after recovery he was named in the squad to face his old club Chelsea at Stamford Bridge on 16 January 2010, and within less than ten minutes of coming on as a second-half substitute he scored his first goal for the club, a fine half-volley to reduce his team's deficit to 5–1, having been 4–0 down at half-time. The Black Cats eventually succumbed to a 7–2 defeat. On 3 April 2010, Zenden scored his second goal for Sunderland, a left-footed volley in a 3–1 win against Tottenham Hotspur at the Stadium of Light.

On 17 May 2010, Zenden signed a new one-year contract at the club. Zenden's first start of the season came in Sunderland's 0–0 draw with Manchester United, where he hit the post. Zenden became a YouTube hit after celebrating a goal with Asamoah Gyan in Sunderland's 3–0 victory at Chelsea. Zenden notched his first of the season against Bolton in a 2–1 away win, on 7 May, which he dedicated to his ill father. Following the match, manager Steve Bruce confirmed Zenden would be offered a new contract at the club. Zenden, however, revealed he would quit the club at the end of the season to prolong his career. On 22 May 2011, his last game for Sunderland, he scored the opening goal in a 3–0 win over already-relegated West Ham on the final day of the 2010–11 Premier League season.

== International career ==
Zenden made his debut for the Netherlands national team in a 1998 FIFA World Cup qualification match against San Marino on 30 April 1997. He was included in the starting formation and played the entire match as the Netherlands won 6–0. He was called up to represent the Netherlands at the 1998 World Cup finals in France, where Zenden started the tournament as a substitute. Coming on twice as a substitute, he was selected to start in the semi-final loss to Brazil. He was once more selected to play in the third-place playoff against Croatia, where he scored a goal after a solo run and a powerful long-range shot. After scoring, he attempted to celebrate with an acrobatic somersault, but failed, throwing himself head first to the ground.

It was during the run-up to UEFA Euro 2000 that he gained acclaim, with the tournament itself providing the platform some of his finest performances. His raw pace and acceleration down the flank, coupled with his ability to function both as a wing-forward and as a wing-back made him a versatile player to have in the squad. His man of the match performance in a friendly against Germany at the turn of the millennium cemented his position in the national team – he set up the opening goal for Patrick Kluivert, then added his own name to the scoresheet with a thunderous volley from Ronald de Boer's corner, before nearly putting the gloss on the finish when he left the entire German defence for dead with his raw pace, beat the goalkeeper with his shot, only for it to rebound off the upright.

Zenden played in all five Dutch matches at Euro 2000. Carrying his pre-tournament form into the tournament proper, Zenden grabbed a goal against Denmark and the winner against France to help the Netherlands finish top of Group D. The Dutch annihilated Yugoslavia 6–1 in the quarter-final; Zenden once again put in a stellar performance, including the assist for what turned out to be Kluivert's hat-trick goal. He started the semi-final against Italy, but he was substituted in a game that would see the Dutch be eliminated on penalties.

Zenden featured again in Euro 2004, though he only played the first half of the first match against Germany. Following the tournament, Zenden, like other experienced players including Clarence Seedorf and Edgar Davids, found himself excluded from the national squad selection by new Dutch national team coach Marco van Basten.

== Managerial career ==
On 22 November 2012, Zenden replaced Eddie Newton as ex-club Chelsea's new assistant manager when Rafael Benítez took over as manager.

== Career statistics ==
=== Club ===
Appearances and goals by club, season and competition
Club	Season	League			National cup (Note: Includes KNVB Cup, Copa del Rey, FA Cup, Coupe de France)		League cup (Note: Includes Football League Cup, Coupe de la Ligue)		Continental		Other		Total	
Club	Season	Division	Apps	Goals	Apps	Goals	Apps	Goals	Apps	Goals	Apps	Goals	Apps	Goals
PSV	1994–95	Eredivisie	27	5	2	0	–		1 (Note: Appearances in UEFA Cup)	0	–		30	5
PSV	1995–96	Eredivisie	25	7	4	0	–		2	1	–		31	8
PSV	1996–97	Eredivisie	34	8	2	1	–		4 (Note: Appearances in UEFA Cup Winners' Cup)	1	0	0	40	10
PSV	1997–98	Eredivisie	26	12	3	0	–		3 (Note: Appearances in UEFA Champions League)	0	1 (Note: Appearance in Johan Cruyff Shield)	0	33	12
PSV	Total		112	32	11	1	–		10	2	1	0	134	35
Barcelona	1998–99	La Liga	25	0	1	0	–		4	0	2 (Note: Appearances in Supercopa de España)	0	32	0
Barcelona	1999–2000	La Liga	29	2	4	0	–		10	1	2	0	45	3
Barcelona	2000–01	La Liga	10	0	3	0	–		5 (Note: One appearance in UEFA Champions League, four appearances in UEFA Cup)	0	–		18	0
Barcelona	Total		64	2	8	0	–		19	1	4	0	95	3
Chelsea	2001–02	Premier League	22	3	3	0	4	0	3	0	–		32	3
Chelsea	2002–03	Premier League	21	1	4	0	1	0	1	0	–		27	1
Chelsea	Total		43	4	7	0	5	0	4	0	–		59	4
Middlesbrough	2003–04	Premier League	31	4	2	1	6	2	–		–		39	7
Middlesbrough	2004–05	Premier League	36	5	2	0	1	0	10	3	–		49	8
Middlesbrough	Total		67	9	4	1	7	2	10	3	–		88	15
Liverpool	2005–06	Premier League	7	2	0	0	2	0	9	0	1 (Note: Appearance in UEFA Super Cup)	0	19	2
Liverpool	2006–07	Premier League	16	0	0	0	2	0	11	0	1 (Note: Appearance in FA Community Shield)	0	30	0
Liverpool	Total		23	2	0	0	4	0	20	0	2	0	49	2
Marseille	2007–08	Ligue 1	27	2	2	0	1	0	8	0	–		38	2
Marseille	2008–09	Ligue 1	27	4	1	0	1	0	9	0	–		38	4
Marseille	Total		54	6	3	0	2	0	17	0	–		76	6
Sunderland	2009–10	Premier League	20	2	1	0	0	0	–		–		21	2
Sunderland	2010–11	Premier League	27	2	0	0	2	0	–		–		29	2
Sunderland	Total		47	2	1	0	2	0	–		–		50	4
Career total			410	59	34	2	20	2	80	6	7	0	551	69

=== International ===
Appearances and goals by national team and year
National team	Year	Apps	Goals
Netherlands	1997	2	0
Netherlands	1998	8	1
Netherlands	1999	7	1
Netherlands	2000	9	3
Netherlands	2001	9	1
Netherlands	2002	5	0
Netherlands	2003	7	0
Netherlands	2004	7	1
Total		54	7

Scores and results list the Netherlands' goal tally first, score column indicates score after each Zenden goal.

List of international goals scored by Boudewijn Zenden
No.	Date	Venue	Opponent	Score	Result	Competition
1	11 July 1998	Paris, France	Croatia	1–1	1–2	1998 FIFA World Cup
2	9 October 1999	Amsterdam, Netherlands	Brazil	2–0	2–2	Friendly
3	23 February 2000	Amsterdam, Netherlands	Germany	2–1	2–1	Friendly
4	16 June 2000	Rotterdam, Netherlands	Denmark	3–0	3–0	UEFA Euro 2000
5	21 June 2000	Amsterdam, Netherlands	France	3–2	3–2	UEFA Euro 2000
6	5 September 2001	Eindhoven, Netherlands	Estonia	1–0	5–0	2002 FIFA World Cup qualification
7	28 April 2004	Eindhoven, Netherlands	Greece	2–0	4–0	Friendly

== Honours ==
PSV

- Eredivisie: 1996–97
- KNVB Cup: 1995–96
- Johan Cruyff Shield: 1996, 1997

Barcelona

- La Liga: 1998–99

Chelsea

- FA Cup runner-up: 2001–02

Middlesbrough

- Football League Cup: 2003–04

Liverpool

- FA Community Shield: 2006
- UEFA Super Cup: 2005
- UEFA Champions League runner-up: 2006–07

Individual

- Dutch Young Player of the Year: 1997
