= Dick Advocaat =

Dutch footballer and manager (born 1947)

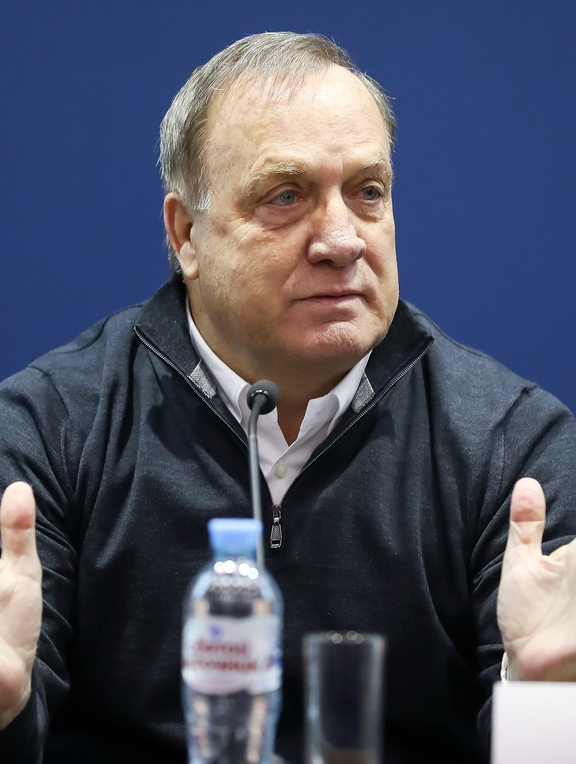
- Advocaat in 2021

Personal information
- Full name: Dirk Nicolaas Advocaat
- Date of birth: 27 September 1947 (age 79)
- Place of birth: The Hague, Netherlands
- Height: 1.70 m (5 ft 7 in)
- Positions: Defensive midfielder; centre-back

Team information
- Current team: Curaçao (manager)

Senior career*
Years	Team	Apps	(Gls)
1966–1973	ADO	147	(7)
1967	→ San Francisco Gales (loan)	7	(1)
1973–1977	Roda JC	113	(2)
1977–1979	FC VVV	74	(6)
1979	Chicago Sting	32	(3)
1979–1980	FC Den Haag	11	(1)
1980	Chicago Sting	31	(1)
1980–1982	Sparta	61	(6)
1982–1983	Berchem Sport	10	(0)
1983–1984	Utrecht	39	(0)
Total		525	(27)

Managerial career
- 1980–1984: DSVP
- 1987: Netherlands Women
- 1987–1989: Haarlem
- 1989–1991: SVV
- 1991–1992: Dordrecht
- 1992–1994: Netherlands
- 1994–1998: PSV
- 1998–2001: Rangers
- 2002–2004: Netherlands
- 2004–2005: Borussia Mönchengladbach
- 2005: United Arab Emirates
- 2005–2006: South Korea
- 2006–2009: Zenit Saint Petersburg
- 2009–2010: Belgium
- 2009–2010: AZ
- 2010–2012: Russia
- 2012–2013: PSV
- 2013–2014: AZ
- 2014: Serbia
- 2015: Sunderland
- 2016–2017: Fenerbahçe
- 2017: Netherlands
- 2017–2018: Sparta
- 2018–2019: Utrecht
- 2019–2021: Feyenoord
- 2021: Iraq
- 2022–2023: ADO Den Haag
- 2024–2026: Curaçao
- 2026–: Curaçao
- * Club domestic league appearances and goals

Dirk Nicolaas "Dick" Advocaat (Dutch pronunciation: [ˈdɪk ɑtfoːˈkaːt]; born 27 September 1947) is a Dutch professional football coach and former player who is the manager of the Curaçao national team. A successful player and manager, he is nicknamed "The Little General", a reference to his mentor Rinus Michels.

Advocaat has coached a number of clubs in the Netherlands and abroad (including the Russian club Zenit Saint Petersburg, with which he won the 2008 UEFA Cup and the 2008 UEFA Super Cup), as well as the national teams of a number of countries (including the Netherlands, South Korea, Belgium and Russia). With the Netherlands, he reached the quarterfinals of the 1994 FIFA World Cup and the semifinals of the 2004 UEFA European Championship.

== Club career ==
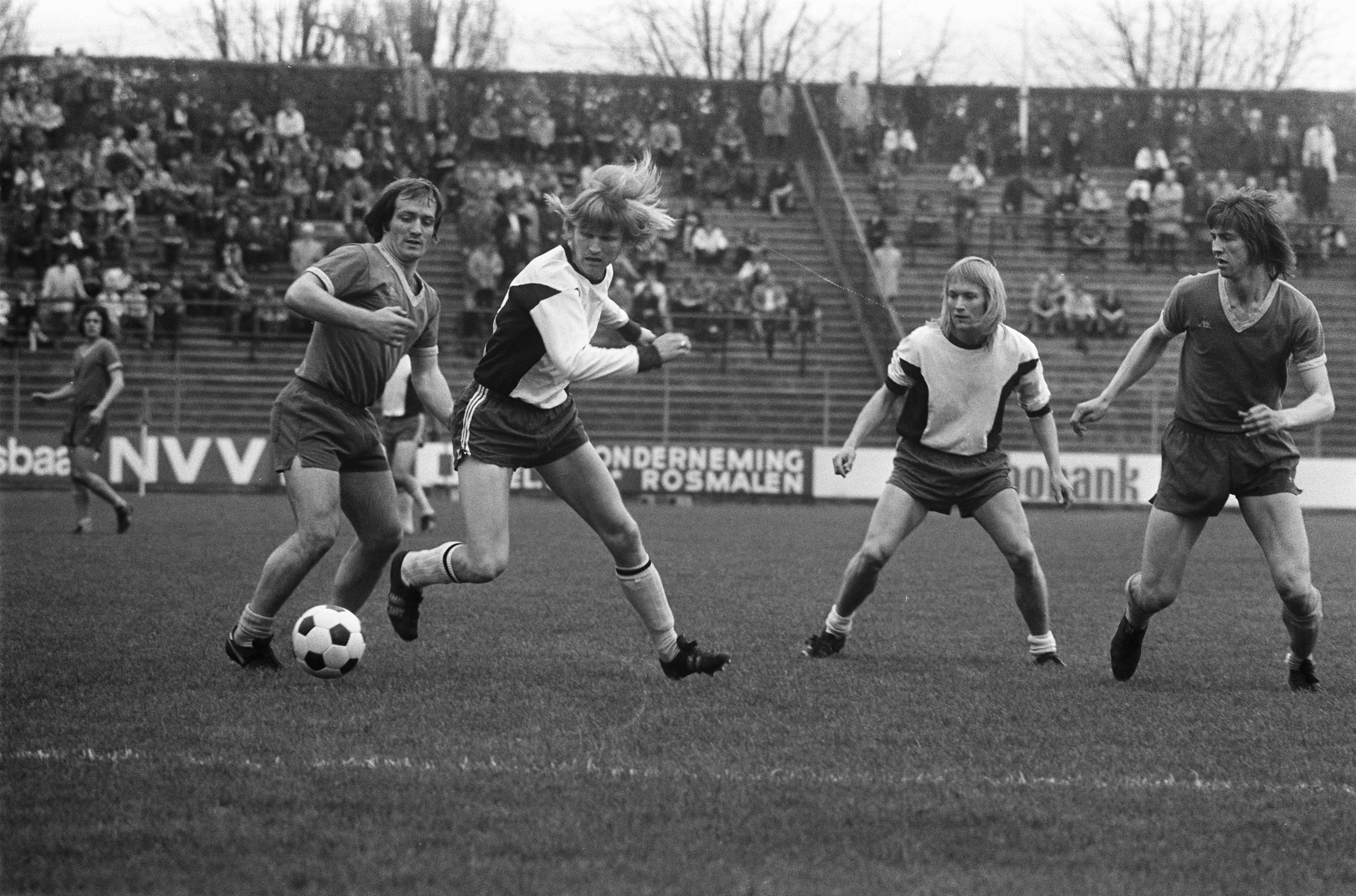
Advocaat (left, in white) during his time playing for FC Den Haag

Advocaat was born in The Hague and was a defensive midfielder during his playing days. His career began as an 18-year-old with Hague club ADO Den Haag, and he made his professional debut with the club on 21 May 1967 in a 3–0 win against GVAV. He only featured for Den Haag once more that season, and that summer, the San Francisco Golden Gate Gales franchise imported the Den Haag team, which included Advocaat, to play for six weeks in the United Soccer Association as part of an effort to make the sport more popular in the United States. It was the following season that Advocaat won his only honour as a player, the KNVB Cup, in 1968. In the 1969–70 season, he became a regular in the side, making 29 appearances and scoring his first goal for the club. He made 33 appearances the season after that. From the 1971–72, the club merged with Holland Sport to become FC Den Haag. That season, his final one for the club, Advocaat made a further 66 appearances and scored 6 goals. In total, he made 147 appearances and scored 7 goals for the club.

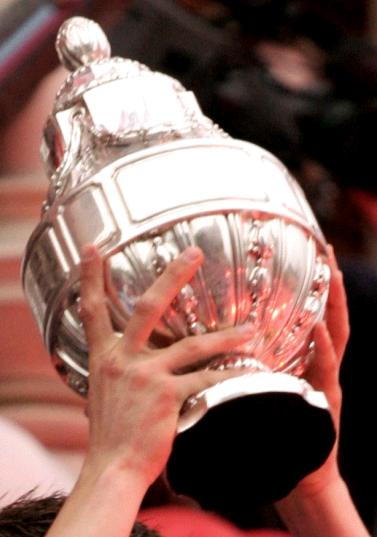
Advocaat won the KNVB Cup as a player with FC Den Haag

From 1973, Advocaat's playing career continued for Roda JC until he moved to VVV during the 1976–77 season. With Roda JC, Advocaat made 121 total appearances and scored 2 goals. When the club was to be discontinued in 2009, Goal.com described him as their most famous player. In his first season with VVV, Advocaat scored 2 goals in 20 appearances. He made 33 appearances in the 1977–78 season, scoring four goals, and made a further 21 appearances in his final season at the club. In total, he made 74 appearances and scored 6 goals.

In 1978, Advocaat made the move to the United States to play with the Chicago Sting in the North American Soccer League (NASL). That season, he made 24 appearances, scoring two goals. In 1979, he scored three more goals in 28 appearances and for the 1980 season, he scored one further goal from 29 appearances. During the break between the 1979 and 1980 NASL seasons, Advocaat returned to the Netherlands and made 11 appearances, scoring one goal, for his former club, FC Den Haag.

Following the 1980 NASL season, Advocaat moved to Sparta Rotterdam to play the remainder of the 1980–81 season. He spent 18 months at the club, scoring six goals and making 61 appearances. Following that, Advocaat moved to Belgium and played in the second division for K. Berchem Sport. However, he only made ten appearances there before moving back to the Eredivisie to join Utrecht, where he made 39 more appearances before the end of his playing career.

== Coaching career ==
=== 1981–92: Early coaching in the Netherlands ===
In addition to playing football, Advocaat was a physical education teacher and became involved in coaching in 1981 when his older brother Jaap was offered a job running amateur Saturday football side Door Samenwerking Verkregen Pijnacker (DSVP). Jaap did not take the role but recommended Dick for the job. Advocaat coached this side during the final four years of his playing career with Sparta Rotterdam and Utrecht.

In 1984, Advocaat was unexpectedly appointed as assistant to Netherlands national team head coach Rinus Michels. Advocaat became a protégé of Michels, whose sobriquet was "The General". In reference to this, Advocaat acquired the nickname "The Little General". In 1987, Advocaat became manager of his first professional club, HFC Haarlem, which he led for two years. Haarlem finished in ninth place in the 1987–88 season and tenth place in the 1988–89 season. Haarlem were eliminated in the second round of the KNVB Cup in both seasons.

Advocaat then moved to Schiedamse Voetbal Vereniging (SVV) as manager. At SVV, alongside technical director Wim Jansen, Advocaat led the team to become Eerste Divisie champions in the 1989–90 season to win promotion to the 1990–91 Eredivisie, winning by 15 points. In 1991, SVV merged with neighbouring club Dordrecht '90, which failed to win promotion to the 1991 play-offs. SVV had finished 16th the previous season, but remained in the Eredivisie after winning their relegation play-off. The two teams competed as SVV/Dordrecht '90 during the 1991–92 season, where they finished in 15th place. and became FC Dordrecht the following season, after Advocaat had left. Despite success at both clubs, Advocaat was criticised in his initial coaching years for playing defensive football.

=== 1992–98: Dutch national team and PSV Eindhoven ===
In 1990, Advocaat once more became an assistant to Michels, who was having his fourth spell as coach of the Dutch national team and looking to qualify for UEFA Euro 1992. At Euro 1992, it became apparent it would be Michels' last job, and following the tournament, Advocaat took over as national coach. Advocaat lost his first two matches in charge, a friendly against Italy and a 1994 FIFA World Cup qualifier against Norway. During the qualifying campaign, Advocaat and Ruud Gullit fell out; Gullit was unhappy with Advocaat's tactics in the World Cup qualifier against England and was eventually substituted. Following this, Gullit retired from international football, but was widely expected to return with a change of administration in the summer. Advocaat qualified for the World Cup, following a crucial win against qualification rivals England. Despite the result, Advocaat was scheduled to lose his job to Johan Cruyff for the 1994 World Cup. However, talks between Cruyff and the Royal Dutch Football Association (KNVB) broke down at the last minute and Advocaat retained his position, causing Gullit to remain in retirement although he initially joined the Dutch squad for the 1994 World Cup. In 1993, the Dutch national team had a record of five wins and two draws.

At the World Cup, Advocaat led the Dutch to the quarter-finals, where they lost 3–2 to eventual winners Brazil. Following the World Cup, Advocaat returned to manage at club level. His final match was a 5–0 win against Luxembourg.

Advocaat returned to coaching at club level with PSV on 16 December 1994, taking over from interim manager Kees Rijvers. His first match was 1–0 loss against Ajax on 22 January 1995. PSV finished third that season. Coming to the club, Advocaat coached existing players Ronaldo and Luc Nilis, and in 1995–96, Advocaat's first full season with the club, he led PSV to second place in the Eredivisie. They also won that year's KNVB Cup, which qualified them for the following years UEFA Cup Winners' Cup. Over the summer, Advocaat signed Jaap Stam, and in the 1996–97 season, PSV won the Eredivisie title and qualified for the UEFA Champions League the following year. In June 1998, Advocaat left the club. PSV also won the Johan Cruyff Shield, the Dutch Super Cup, in 1996 and 1997.

=== 1998–2001: Rangers ===
In 1998, Advocaat accepted the invitation from Rangers chairman David Murray to become the Scottish Premier League (SPL) team's new manager. Walter Smith was still in the job but had announced his departure in advance.

When Advocaat took charge of Rangers, he became the first foreign manager to do so and only the tenth manager in the history of the club. The previous season was the last of seven under Walter Smith, and the first time the club had finished without a trophy in 12 years. Long-term members of the squad that had won nine league championships in a row left, including Ally McCoist, Ian Durrant, Andy Goram and Stuart McCall. With financial backing from chairman David Murray, Advocaat invested heavily in the team. Big money signings such as Giovanni van Bronckhorst, Arthur Numan and Andrei Kanchelskis were among Advocaat's first as Rangers tried to regain the league championship.

In Advocaat's first season, 1998–99, Rangers won the domestic treble, finishing six points above second-place Celtic in the league, defeating Celtic 1–0 in the Scottish Cup final, and defeating St. Johnstone 2–1 in the League Cup final. The club also had a short run in the UEFA Cup, where they reached the round of 16. In the following season, the club won the SPL by an SPL record 21-point margin, and also won the 1999–2000 Scottish Cup. Rangers fans paid tribute to Advocaat and the Dutch Rangers players at the 2000 Scottish Cup Final by wearing replica orange Netherlands international tops and other orange merchandise. Advocaat also guided Rangers into the UEFA Champions League, having beaten UEFA Cup winners Parma in the third round qualifier. However, Rangers went out of the group stage after being drawn alongside Bayern Munich, PSV and Valencia. The club then lost to Borussia Dortmund in a penalty shoot out in the UEFA Cup.

Advocaat's third season at Rangers was less successful. Despite investment in the team with players such as Tore André Flo for a record £12 million, Rangers failed to win any trophies, as Celtic under new manager Martin O'Neill won the domestic treble. Advocaat branded some of his players "fat-necks" in the press. In Europe, Rangers qualified for the UEFA Champions league for the second consecutive season after two qualifying rounds. They were drawn alongside Sturm Graz, Galatasaray and Monaco. After good results against Sturm Graz and Monaco, the club failed to qualify for the next phase of the competition, finishing third behind Galatasaray on goal difference. Rangers then lost 3–0 to 1. FC Kaiserslautern in the UEFA Cup.

In his last season at Rangers, with Celtic leading the SPL by 12 points, Advocaat resigned from the manager's position on 12 December 2001. His final match was a 1–1 draw against Hibernian. Alex McLeish was appointed as his successor, with Advocaat moving to the position of general manager. Advocaat eventually left Rangers for the Netherlands national team. More than a decade later, in March 2012, Advocaat's reign as manager came under scrutiny as Rangers entered administration. Advocaat defended the money spent on transfer fees and said he did not think the club would go bankrupt.

=== 2002–06: International management and Mönchengladbach ===
Advocaat rejoined the national team set-up following Louis van Gaal's failure to take the national team to the 2002 World Cup in January 2002 and presided over the Netherlands qualification for Euro 2004 via the playoffs. His first match was 1–1 draw against England. The Oranje had finished second in their group behind the Czech Republic and therefore went into a playoff in order to qualify for Euro 2004. They managed to achieve this after a 6–1 aggregate win over Scotland but not before surviving a harrowing encounter, losing 1–0 in the first leg in Scotland. Advocaat was criticised by the Dutch media so much so that several of the team's players refused to speak to the media even after the comfortable and inspired 6–0 victory in the return leg at the Amsterdam Arena.

Despite taking Netherlands to the semi-finals of Euro 2004, the Dutch media were critical of Advocaat. Netherlands were beaten 2–1 by Portugal in the semi-finals of Euro 2004 after a dismal performance. The team also made several criticisms of his tactics, especially those in the team's shock loss to the Czech Republic in the second match of the first round of the tournament. In that match, Advocaat made a tactical change that shocked even his own players, as he brought on the aging Paul Bosvelt in midfield to replace crowd favourite Arjen Robben, who had been contributing immensely throughout the match with two assists. The Czechs seized the opportunity to capitalize on it and scored the decisive goal. Shortly after the tournament, with mounting pressure and even death threats, Advocaat quit his job as head coach on 6 July 2004.

Advocaat then went briefly back into club management. He was hired by German club Borussia Mönchengladbach on 2 November 2004. His first match was a 1–1 draw against Mainz 05 on 6 November 2004. He resigned on 18 April 2005 after less than six months at the helm. His final match was 1–1 draw against Mainz 05 on 16 April 2005. He finished with a record of four wins, six draws, and eight losses.

In July 2005, Advocaat signed a one-year contract to become coach of the United Arab Emirates national team, but he terminated this contract in September to become manager of South Korea's national team from 1 October 2005 until the end of the 2006 World Cup. During his tenure with the UAE, Advocaat was manager for two matches at the 1st International Arab Friendly Tournament in Switzerland. UAE won the first match against Kuwait 7–6 on penalties after the match had finished 1–1. They then lost the final to Egypt 4–5 on penalties, following a 0–0 draw in normal time.

Advocaat's first match in charge of South Korea was a friendly against Iran on 12 October 2005, which South Korea won 2–0. Two more friendlies were played that year in November, a draw against Sweden and a victory against Serbia.

In early 2006, during the break between domestic seasons, Advocaat took a 23-man squad of players from the K-League and J-League and embarked on a five-week, ten-match tour. It started with an Advocaat's first defeat as manager against the UAE. From there they travelled to Riyadh, Saudi Arabia, where they drew with Greece and won against Finland. Then they travelled to Hong Kong to take part in the Carlsberg Cup, where they defeated Croatia before losing in the final to Denmark. They then travelled to America where they lost to Costa Rica, won against Major League Soccer (MLS) side LA Galaxy and Mexico. The tour finished in Aleppo, Syria, on 22 February 2006 with an Asian Cup qualifying match against Syria which they won 2–1, ending the tour with six wins, one draw and three losses. In the lead up to the World Cup, South Korea played five more friendlies, winning two, drawing two and losing one.

At the World Cup, South Korea opened their campaign with a 2–1 victory over Togo. In their second group match, they scored a late equalizer to draw 1–1 against France, putting them in a position to qualify from Group G. However, South Korea failed to make it into the last 16 after a 2–0 loss against Switzerland, while France defeated Togo 2–0 to advance to the next round. Following Korea's exit from the World Cup, Advocaat resigned.

=== 2006–09: Zenit Saint Petersburg ===
In December 2005, gas giant Gazprom took over as owners of Russian Premier League team Zenit Saint Petersburg. After a mediocre start to the season, manager Vlastimil Petržela was sacked in the summer. On 26 June 2006, Advocaat was appointed in his place, signing an 18-month contract with the option of a one-year extension. Zenit finished the 2006 season in fourth place, earning a place in the 2007–08 UEFA Cup second qualifying round. In December 2006, the Russian Premier League transfer record was broken twice, first with the signing of Pavel Pogrebnyak and then again when Zenit bought Alejandro Domínguez.

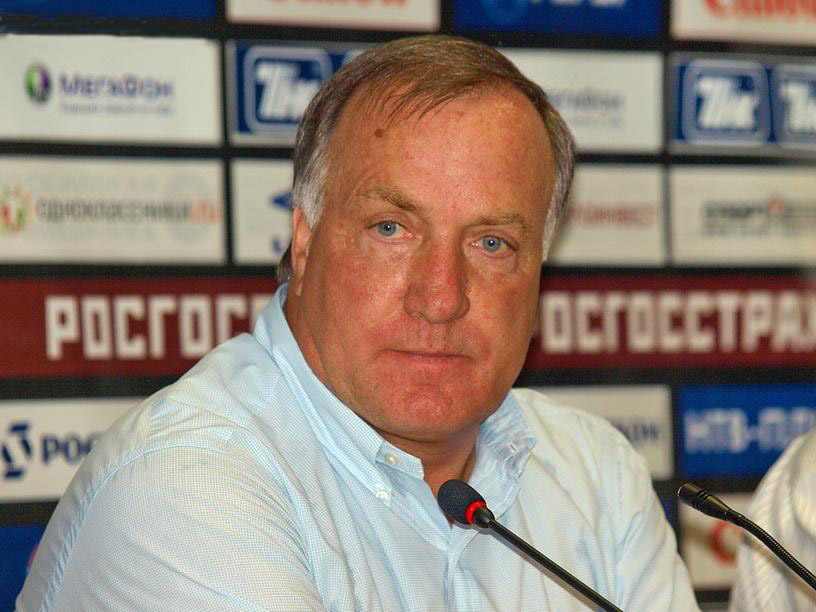
Advocaat in 2007

For the 2007 season, Advocaat led Zenit to their first domestic league title since the Soviet Union was disbanded. Zenit won by two points over second–place Spartak Moscow. Andrey Arshavin stood out as the star player of the season, being the only member of the team to start all 30 league matches. Advocaat became the first foreign coach to win the Russian championship and, by winning the league, Zenit qualified for the group stage of the Champions League the following season. In August, Advocaat had signed a deal to become manager of the Australia national team, however when Zenit offered him a new US$4 million contract extension in November, Advocaat reneged on the deal with Australia. In Europe, Zenit qualified for the group stage of the UEFA Cup. Zenit finished third in their group and advanced to the last 32 of the competition. They progressed to the quarter-finals coming through matches against Villarreal and Marseille on the away goals rule.

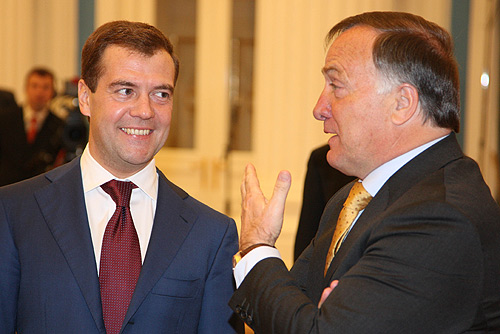
Advocaat with then-Russian president Dmitry Medvedev at the Moscow Kremlin in 2008

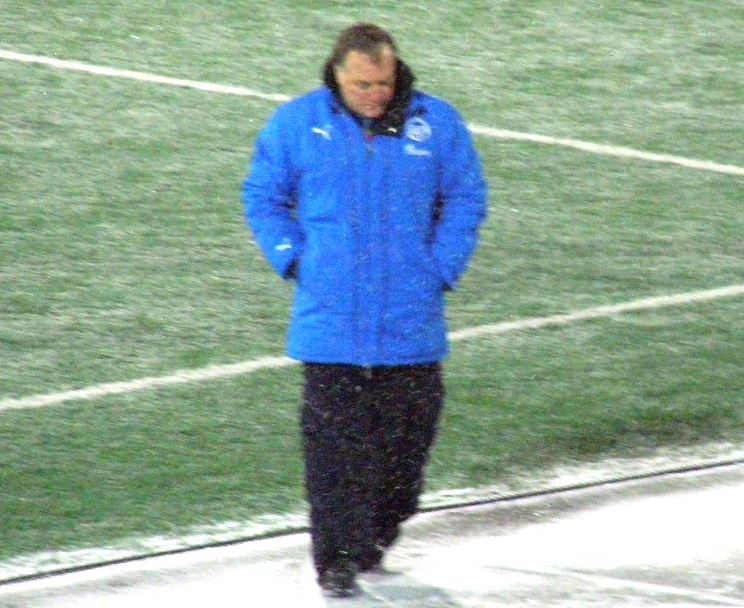
Advocaat with Zenit Saint Petersburg in 2008

Prior to the start of the 2008 domestic season, as league winners, Zenit faced Russian Cup winners Lokomotiv Moscow in the Russian Super Cup on 9 March 2008; Zenit won the match 2–0. Continuing in the UEFA Cup, Zenit were victorious against German clubs Bayer Leverkusen and Bayern Munich to reach the final against Rangers, Advocaat's former club. In the final, played on 14 May 2008, Zenit won 2–0 to become only the second Russian team to ever win a European trophy. On 24 August 2008, Dynamo Moscow player Danny transferred to Zenit for a Russian record transfer fee of €30 million (£23 million). The arrival of Danny increased speculation that Arshavin was to leave the club, but the club rejected substantial bids from both Barcelona and Tottenham Hotspur in the summer transfer window, despite the player's strong desire to leave the club.

On 29 August 2008, Zenit contested with Champions League winners Manchester United for the European Super Cup. Zenit won the match 2–1 with new signing Danny scoring the decisive goal. In Europe, Zenit failed to advance from their Champions League group but finished third which meant they entered into the last 32 of the UEFA Cup. That year, Zenit finished fifth domestically, qualifying for the play-offs of the Europa League the following season. On 7 November 2008, Advocaat signed a one-year extension that contracted him to the club until the end of 2009. In December, Advocaat was named Trainer of the Year in Russia.

In January 2009, Arshavin was heavily rumoured to move again. Towards the end of the winter transfer window, the Russian threatened to strike if he was not sold. Arshavin transferred to Arsenal at the last-minute for around £16.9 million. In February, Zenit's UEFA Cup continued and Zenit progressed to the last 16. They failed to reach the quarter-finals, though, losing to Udinese 2–1 on aggregate. In the domestic season, Advocaat fielded seven foreign players in a team selection (one more than the league rules allow) against Lokomotiv Moscow in April 2009. Advocaat admitted he was at fault for the mistake and the club were fined but not deducted points. In May 2009, Advocaat agreed to become manager of the Belgium national team when his contract with Zenit expired on 1 January 2010. However, on 10 August 2009, after run of poor results, he was sacked by the club with Zenit seventh in the league. His final match was a 2–0 loss to Tom Tomsk on 9 August 2009. Zenit were in seventh place at the time of the dismissal.

=== 2009–10: Belgium and AZ ===
Before his dismissal from Zenit, Advocaat had already agreed a two-year, US$1,688,400 contract as manager of Belgium to start in 2010. However, when Belgium failed to qualify for the 2010 World Cup, Franky Vercauteren resigned as manager and Advocaat's contract was brought forward to commence on 1 October 2009. Advocaat's first two matches in charge were the remaining fixtures in the qualifying campaign, a 2–0 victory against Turkey and a 2–0 defeat to Estonia. In the remainder of 2009, Belgium won in friendly matches against Hungary and Qatar. Belgium lost their first match of 2010 in a friendly against Croatia.

On 6 December 2009, it was announced Advocaat would function as manager of both the Belgium national team and Dutch club AZ. Advocaat succeeded Ronald Koeman, who was dismissed the previous day, and his contract ran until the end of the 2009–10 season. Advocaat only watched AZ's final group match of the Champions League on 9 December 2009, which Martin Haar managed. He was officially presented to the media the following day. His first match in charge was against PSV in the Eredivisie on 12 December 2009; AZ lost 1–0. His first win managing the club came the following weekend, a 3–0 win against ADO Den Haag. Belgium lost to Croatia on 3 March 2010.

On 15 April 2010, Advocaat left as manager of the Belgian national team after breaking his contract with the Royal Belgian Football Association (KBVB) amid speculation he was to become coach of the Russia national team. Advocaat was later appointed Russia manager and announced his intention to leave AZ at the end of the season. On 22 April 2010, it was announced that Gertjan Verbeek would take over as AZ manager for the following season. Under Advocaat, AZ finished fifth in the league, entering the third qualifying round of the 2010–11 UEFA Europa League.

=== 2010–12: Russia ===
Advocaat and Morten Olsen before the friendly Denmark–Russia at Parken, 2012

On 17 May 2010, Advocaat was named the new manager of the Russia national team. He began his contract on 1 July, succeeding compatriot Guus Hiddink. Advocaat signed a four-year contract.

Advocaat's side began their qualifying campaign for Euro 2012 with an unexpected defeat at home to Slovakia. However, Russia managed to win their group and secure automatic qualification to the Euro 2012 finals.

Russia began the participation of Euro 2012 (Group A) in a promising fashion by defeating the Czech Republic 4–1 and playing a 1–1 draw against hosts Poland. However, the team ultimately failed to pass the group stage after losing to Greece 1–0 in the last match. It was already decided before the tournament that Advocaat would leave to take charge of PSV.

=== 2012–14: Return to PSV and AZ; Serbian national team ===
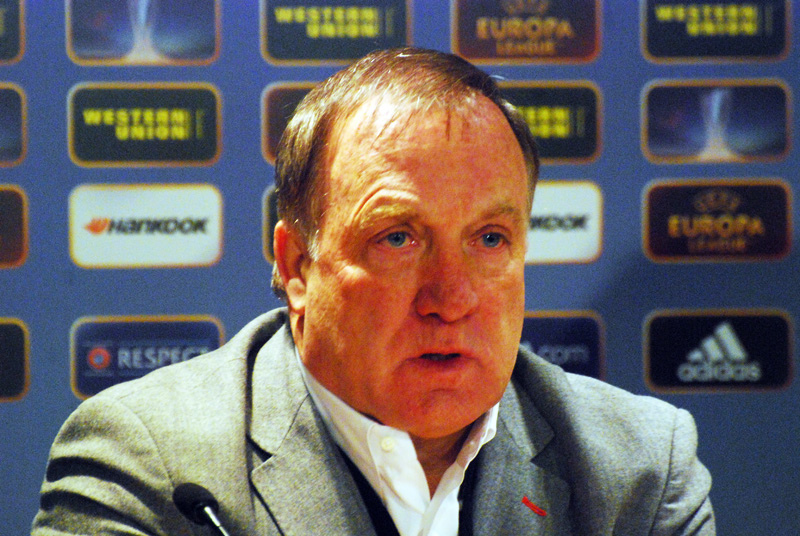
Advocaat with AZ in 2014

Advocaat signed a contract with Dutch giants PSV. The contract began on 1 July 2012. He replaced Fred Rutten, who was sacked in March 2012. For Advocaat, it was a return to the club from which he had his first success.

Advocaat began his new job with a win in the show competition 2012 Polish Masters, followed up by beating Ajax 4–2 to secure the 2012 Johan Cruyff Shield. The 2012–13 Eredivisie campaign under Advocaat began with a shock defeat to RKC Waalwijk. At the winter break, PSV were leading the league table on goal difference over Twente. In the Europa League, PSV finished third in Group F.

After finishing second to champions Ajax in the Eredivisie, and losing the cup final to AZ, Advocaat announced his retirement from club coaching at the end of the 2012–13 season. However, on 15 October 2013, he returned to AZ to succeed the sacked Gertjan Verbeek. He was replaced at the end of the season by Marco van Basten. AZ finished the season in eighth place. He also reached the semi–finals of the KNVB Cup and the quarter–finals of the Europa League.

In July 2014, Advocaat was named the new manager of the Serbia national team. As the beginning of the UEFA Euro 2016 qualifying, Serbia earned just one single point in three matches: Serbia drew 1–1 with Armenia; forfeited (3–0 loss) their match against Albania because of stadium incidents during the match; then lost 3–1 to Denmark. Advocaat agreed to terminate his contract following the 3–1 home defeat against Denmark on 14 November 2014.

=== 2015: Sunderland ===
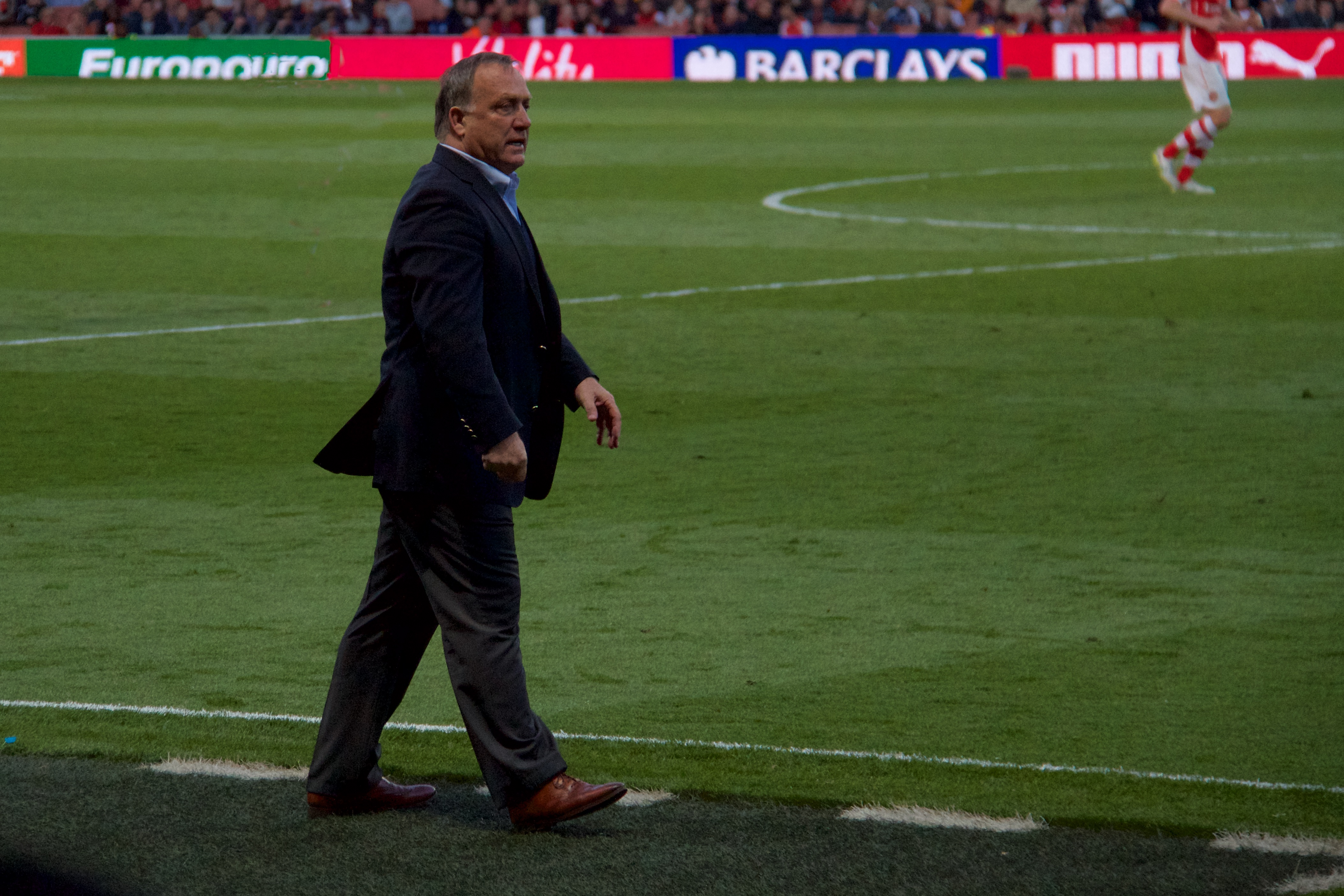
Advocaat on the touchline as manager of Sunderland in May 2015

Following the sacking of manager Gus Poyet, Advocaat was appointed manager of English Premier League club Sunderland on 17 March 2015 until the end of the season. Initially, Advocaat was appointed on temporary basis. His first match in charge was a 1–0 loss to West Ham United four days later. His first win as manager came from his second match, a 1–0 victory over Newcastle United in the Tyne–Wear derby on 5 April 2015. Following a 4–1 home defeat to Crystal Palace, Advocaat oversaw a turnaround in Sunderland's form with a 1–1 draw at Stoke City, and back to back wins against Southampton and Everton.

Advocaat guided Sunderland to Premier League safety on 20 May 2015 with one match remaining after a 0–0 draw at Arsenal, and a visibly moved Advocaat was pictured in tears after the final whistle. Sunderland finished the season in 16th place, two spots and three points above the relegation zone.

He left the club a week later, announcing the end of his managerial career, but reversed his decision to retire on 4 June 2015, signing a one-year contract with Sunderland. During the summer transfer window, the club made two major signings in winger Jeremain Lens, who previously played under Advocaat at PSV, and striker Fabio Borini, who played for Sunderland on loan during the 2013–14 season. The club also signed several defenders and secured the loan signings of Yann M'Vila, DeAndre Yedlin and Ola Toivonen, the latter having also played under Advocaat at PSV. Despite the additions, Sunderland made a poor start to the season with a 4–2 away defeat at Leicester City on 8 August and a 1–3 home defeat to newly promoted Norwich City the following week. Following a 2–2 draw with West Ham, Advocaat resigned on 4 October 2015. His only win in the 2015–16 season was a 6–3 victory against Exeter City on 25 August 2015 in the League Cup. At the time of Advocaat's resignation, Sunderland were in 19th place and in the relegation zone. He finished with a record of four wins, six draws and nine losses.

=== 2016: Fenerbahçe ===
On 17 August 2016, Advocaat signed a one-year contract with Turkish Süper Lig club Fenerbahçe. His first match in charge was a 2016–17 UEFA Europa League home tie against Grasshopper, which Fenerbahçe won 3–0. On 3 November, Advocaat led Fenerbahçe to a 2–1 win at home against Manchester United in the fourth group stage match of the Europa League and finished the group stage in first place, above United, with 13 points.

=== 2017: Netherlands ===
On 9 May 2017, Advocaat was revealed as the new manager of the Netherlands, his third spell in charge of the national team. His first match in charge was the World Cup qualifier at home against Luxembourg on 9 June, which the Netherlands won 5–0. He was joined by Ruud Gullit as his assistant, whom Advocaat previously clashed with in his first spell in charge of the Oranje. After failing to qualify to the World Cup, Advocaat stepped down following the November friendlies against Scotland and Romania. With victories in both matches, he became the most successful Netherlands manager in terms of winning, with a total number of 37 victories, a record previously held by Bob Glendenning for 77 years.

=== 2018: Sparta Rotterdam ===
On 25 December 2017, Sparta Rotterdam announced that Advocaat would be the club's new manager for the remainder of the 2017–18 season. On 20 May 2018, Sparta was relegated to the Eerste Divisie following a 1–3 loss to Emmen in the Promotion/relegation play-offs.

=== Utrecht ===
On 12 September Utrecht announced they had a verbal agreement with Advocaat to finish the 2018-2019 season, after their previous manager had been sacked after four games.

=== Feyenoord ===
On 30 October 2019, Feyenoord announced that Dick Advocaat was appointed as the club's coach for the remainder of the 2019–20 Eredivisie season after their previous manager Jaap Stam had resigned. On 3 November 2019, Feyenoord played their first game under Dick Advocaat, winning 3–0 in an away game against VVV. On 21 April 2020, Feyenoord announced that the club and Advocaat had reached an agreement for Advocaat to continue being the club's coach for the 2020–21 season. On 12 September 2020, Advocaat become the oldest coach in the history of the Dutch Eredivisie at 72 years and 351 days old.

=== Iraq ===
On 1 August 2021, he was unveiled as the new head coach of Iraq national football team to lead them in the FIFA World Cup Qualifiers. However, he did not manage a win in six games, with four draws and two losses. He resigned on 23 November 2021.

=== ADO Den Haag ===
On 28 November 2022, Advocaat was appointed as the new manager of a struggling ADO Den Haag side, after former manager Dirk Kuyt had been fired after an unsuccessful spell at the club. Advocaat retired as a coach at the end of the 2022–23 season as ADO Den Haag finished the season in mid-table of the second-tier Eerste Divisie.

=== Curaçao ===
On 15 January 2024, Advocaat was appointed as the new head coach of the Curaçao national team, signing a one-year contract with an option for a further year. On 18 November 2025, Curaçao managed to qualify for the 2026 FIFA World Cup, the team's first World Cup in their history. They finished their qualifying campaign at the top of their Group B after a goalless away draw against Jamaica, even though he missed the match due to family reasons. He resigned from his position in February 2026 due to his daughter's health concerns. On May 11, however, Advocaat returned to the national team after his daughter's health improved. His return was also a result of disagreements between the national team's players and Advocaat's successor Fred Rutten as well as pressure from the national team's main sponsor, Corendon Dutch Airlines.

On June 14, Advocaat became the oldest coach to manage a World Cup team, beating out Miroslav Koubek of the Czechia national team by roughly four years. Coincidentally, Koubek himself had only held the title for around three days, accomplishing the feat when he debuted at the World Cup on June 11 and, before him, Hugo Broos of the South Africa national team had held it for barely five hours as he had debuted as the then-oldest that very same day in the World Cup opener. On 9 September, he extended his contract until July 2027.

=== Overview ===
==== Club ====
As of matches played on 28 January 2017.

Club	Season	League								Cup	L. Cup	Europe	Other	Ref.
Club	Season	M	W	D	L	GF	GA	Win %	Pos.	Pos.	Pos.	Pos.	Pos.	Ref.
HFC Haarlem	1987–88	34	14	6	14	42	46	41.18	9th	SR	—	—	—	
HFC Haarlem	1988–89	34	11	11	12	37	50	32.35	10th	SR	—	—	—	
HFC Haarlem	Total	68	25	17	26	79	96	36.76	—	—	—	—	—	—
SVV	1989–90	36	26	6	4	67	21	72.22	1st	TR	—	—	—	
SVV	1990–91	34	8	8	18	31	52	23.53	16th	TR	—	—	W	
SVV	Total	70	34	14	22	98	73	48.57	—	—	—	—	—	—
Dordrecht	1991–92	34	9	7	18	38	64	26.47	15th	FR	—	—	—	
PSV	1994–95	18	12	2	4	46	24	66.67	3rd	—	—	—	—	
PSV	1995–96	34	24	5	5	97	25	70.59	2nd	W	—	QF	—	
PSV	1996–97	34	24	5	5	90	26	70.59	1st	R16	—	SR	W	
PSV	1997–98	34	21	9	4	95	44	61.76	2nd	F	—	GS	W	
PSV	Total	120	81	21	18	328	119	67.50	—	—	—	—	—	—
Rangers	1998–99	36	23	8	5	78	31	63.89	1st	W	W	R16	—	
Rangers	1999–2000	36	28	6	2	96	26	77.78	1st	W	QF	TR	—	
Rangers	2000–01	38	26	4	8	76	36	68.42	2nd	QF	SF	TR	—	
Rangers	2001–02	18	11	5	2	40	13	61.11	—	—	—	—	—	
Rangers	Total	128	88	23	17	290	106	68.75	—	—	—	—	—	—
Borussia Mönchengladbach	2004–05	18	4	6	8	17	29	22.22	—	—	—	—	—	
Zenit	2006	21	10	8	3	28	15	47.62	4th	—	—	—	—	
Zenit	2007	30	18	7	5	54	32	60.00	1st	QF	—	—	—	
Zenit	2008	30	12	12	6	59	37	40.00	5th	QF	—	W	W W	
Zenit	2009	17	6	6	5	24	19	35.29	—	FR	—	GS; R16	—	
Zenit	Total	98	46	33	19	165	103	46.94	—	—	—	—	—	—
AZ	2009–10	18	11	4	3	35	14	61.11	5th	R16	—	—	—	
PSV	2012–13	34	22	3	9	103	43	64.71	2nd	F	—	GS	W	
AZ	2013–14	25	9	7	9	40	34	36.00	8th		—			
Sunderland	2014–15	9	3	3	3	8	10	33.33	16th	—	—	—	—	
Sunderland	2015–16	8	0	3	5	8	18	0.00	19th	—	TR	—	—	
Sunderland	Total	17	3	6	8	16	28	17.65	—	—	—	—	—	—
Fenerbahçe	2016–17	18	10	5	3	37	14	55.56	—	—	—	—	—	

==== National team ====
As of 25 June 2025

Country	Year	Competitions								Friendly matches							Ref.
Country	Year	M	W	D	L	GF	GA	Win %	Pos.	M	W	D	L	GF	GA	Win %	Ref.
Netherlands	1992	3	1	1	1	6	5	33.33	—	1	0	0	1	2	3	0.00	
Netherlands	1993	7	5	2	0	23	4	71.43	2nd	—							
Netherlands	1994	9	5	2	2	18	7	55.56	QF	6	4	1	1	16	5	66.67	
Netherlands	Total	19	11	5	3	47	16	57.89	—	7	4	1	2	18	8	57.14	—
Netherlands	2002	2	2	0	0	6	0	100.00	—	5	4	1	0	8	2	80.00	
Netherlands	2003	8	5	1	2	20	2	62.50	2nd	3	1	2	0	3	2	33.33	
Netherlands	2004	5	1	2	2	7	6	20.00	SF	6	3	1	2	8	2	50.00	
Netherlands	Total	15	8	3	4	33	8	53.33	—	14	8	4	2	19	6	57.14	—
United Arab Emirates	2005	—								2	0	2	0	1	1	0.00	
South Korea	2005	—								3	2	1	0	6	2	66.67	
South Korea	2006	3	1	1	1	3	4	33.33	GS	12	5	3	4	11	10	41.67	
South Korea	Total	3	1	1	1	3	4	33.33	—	15	7	4	4	17	12	46.67	—
Belgium	2009	2	1	0	1	2	2	50.00	4th	2	2	0	0	5	0	100.00	
Belgium	2010	—								1	0	0	1	0	1	0.00	
Belgium	Total	2	1	0	1	2	2	50.00	—	3	2	0	1	5	1	66.67	—
Russia	2010	4	3	0	1	6	3	75.00	—	2	1	0	1	1	2	50.00	
Russia	2011	6	4	2	0	11	1	66.67	1st	5	1	3	1	3	3	20.00	
Russia	2012	3	1	1	1	5	3	33.33	GS	4	2	2	0	6	1	50.00	
Russia	Total	13	8	3	2	22	7	61.54	—	12	4	5	3	10	6	33.33	—
Serbia	2014	3	0	1	2	2	7	0.00	—	1	0	1	0	1	1	0.00	
Netherlands	2017	5	4	0	1	11	6	80.00	3rd	4	4	0	0	11	1	100.00	
Iraq	2021	6	0	4	2	3	9	0.00	—	—							
Curaçao	2024	8	6	1	1	21	4	75.00	—	—							
Curaçao	2025	9	4	3	2	17	6	44.44	GS	1	0	0	1	0	2	0.00	

== Managerial statistics ==
As of match played 15 November 2026

Managerial record by team and tenure
Team	Nat.	From	To	Record								Ref.
Team	Nat.	From	To	G	W	D	L	GF	GA	GD	Win %	Ref.
Haarlem	(Netherlands)	1 July 1987	30 June 1989	72	27	19	26	88	100	−12	37.50	
S.V.V.	(Netherlands)	1 July 1989	30 June 1991	78	39	15	24	115	86	+29	50.00	
Dordrecht	(Netherlands)	1 July 1991	22 August 1992	35	9	7	19	39	68	−29	25.71	
Netherlands	(Netherlands)	7 September 1992	15 December 1994	26	15	6	5	65	24	+41	57.69	
PSV	(Netherlands)	16 December 1994	30 June 1998	152	100	29	23	404	160	+244	65.79	
Rangers	(Scotland)	1 July 1998	12 December 2001	195	131	34	30	427	158	+269	67.18	
Netherlands	(Netherlands)	25 January 2002	6 July 2004	29	16	7	6	52	14	+38	55.17	
Borussia Mönchengladbach	(Germany)	2 November 2004	18 April 2005	18	4	6	8	17	29	−12	22.22	
United Arab Emirates	(United Arab Emirates)	17 July 2005	13 September 2005	2	0	2	0	1	1	+0	0.00	
South Korea	(South Korea)	1 October 2005	9 July 2006	18	8	5	5	20	16	+4	44.44	
Zenit Saint Petersburg	(Russia)	26 June 2006	10 August 2009	135	64	42	29	225	141	+84	47.41	
Belgium	(Belgium)	1 October 2009	15 April 2010	5	3	0	2	7	3	+4	60.00	
AZ	(Netherlands)	6 December 2009	1 July 2010	19	11	4	4	35	15	+20	57.89	
Russia	(Russia)	1 July 2010	30 June 2012	25	12	8	5	32	13	+19	48.00	
PSV	(Netherlands)	1 July 2012	30 June 2013	49	32	4	13	145	58	+87	65.31	
AZ	(Netherlands)	15 October 2013	30 June 2014	43	16	13	14	63	48	+15	37.21	
Serbia	(Serbia)	22 July 2014	15 November 2014	4	0	2	2	3	8	−5	0.00	
Sunderland	(England)	17 March 2015	4 October 2015	19	4	6	9	23	35	−12	21.05	
Fenerbahçe	(Turkey)	17 August 2016	9 May 2017	55	30	16	9	99	49	+50	54.55	
Netherlands	(Netherlands)	9 May 2017	14 November 2017	9	8	0	1	22	7	+15	88.89	
Sparta Rotterdam	(Netherlands)	25 December 2017	30 June 2018	21	6	3	12	26	44	−18	28.57	
Utrecht	(Netherlands)	12 September 2018	1 July 2019	37	19	7	11	71	48	+23	51.35	
Feyenoord	(Netherlands)	30 October 2019	23 May 2021	65	35	18	12	126	72	+54	53.85	
Iraq	(Iraq)	31 July 2021	23 November 2021	6	0	4	2	3	9	−6	0.00	
ADO Den Haag	(Netherlands)	28 November 2022	30 June 2023	25	11	8	6	37	35	+2	44.00	
Curaçao	(Curaçao)	15 January 2024	23 February 2026	20	11	6	3	45	13	+32	55.00	
Curaçao	(Curaçao)	12 May 2026	Present	11	4	3	4	18	20	−2	36.36	
Career Total				1,173	615	274	284	2,208	1,274	+934	52.43	

== Honours ==
=== Player ===
ADO Den Haag

- KNVB Cup: 1967-68

=== Manager ===
SVV

- Eerste Divisie: 1989–90

PSV Eindhoven

- Eredivisie: 1996–97
- KNVB Cup: 1995–96
- Johan Cruyff Shield: 1996, 1997, 2012

Rangers

- Scottish Premier League: 1998–99, 1999–2000
- Scottish Cup: 1998–99, 1999–2000
- Scottish League Cup: 1998–99

Zenit Saint Petersburg

- Russian Premier League: 2007
- UEFA Cup: 2007–08
- UEFA Super Cup: 2008

=== Individual ===
- The 2008 UEFA Cup success earned Advocaat the Honorary Citizen of Saint Petersburg award, making him the city's first foreign honorary citizen since 1866.
- Rinus Michels Lifetime Achievement Award (Rinus Michels Oeuvreprijs): 2021

== Personal life ==
Advocaat is teetotal.

== See also ==
- National team managers with 100 or more matches
- List of football managers with the most matches
