= Marcos (footballer, born 1975) =

Brazilian footballer

Personal information
- Full name: Marcos Joaquim dos Santos
- Date of birth: September 14, 1975 (age 51)
- Place of birth: Caruaru, Brazil
- Height: 1.83 m (6 ft 0 in)
- Position: Centre-back

Youth career
- 1992–1995: Porto-PE

Senior career*
Years	Team	Apps	(Gls)
1995–1998	Rio Ave	30	(6)
1998–1999	PSV	6	(0)
1999–2000	Sporting	5	(0)
2000–2003	Vitória	69	(5)
2003–2004	Estrela Amadora	13	(0)
2005	Vasco		
2005	Paraná	28	(1)
2006–2009	Atlético Mineiro	162	(11)
- * Club domestic league appearances and goals

Marcos Joaquim dos Santos, known as Marcos, (born September 14, 1975) is a Brazilian former professional footballer who played as a centre-back.

== Honours ==
PSV

- Johan Cruyff Shield: 1998
