= 1996 Johan Cruyff Shield =

Johan Cruijff Schaal I
Ajax	PSV Eindhoven
0	3
- Date: 18 August 1996
- Venue: Amsterdam Arena, Amsterdam
- Referee: Jaap Uilenberg
- Attendance: 31,000

The first edition of the Johan Cruyff Shield was held on 18 August 1996 at the Amsterdam Arena. Although this was the seventh Dutch Supercup match to be played, it was the first one held under the Johan Cruyff Shield title (Dutch: Johan Cruijff Schaal), with former editions being played under the name Dutch Supercup (Dutch: Nederlandse Supercup). This was also the first Supercup game to be held at the Amsterdam Arena. From this year on each Supercup game would be played there, with each KNVB Cup final being played at De Kuip in Rotterdam.

The match was the first competitive game to be played at the Amsterdam Arena, after a friendly match between Ajax and Milan four days earlier. It featured the winners of the 1995–96 Eredivisie champions Ajax, and the winners of the 1995–96 KNVB Cup, PSV Eindhoven. The match ended in a 3–0 victory for PSV, with a goal from René Eijkelkamp and two for Marc Degryse, making them the first winners of the Johan Cruyff Shield.

== Match details ==
18 August 1996

Ajax	0–3	PSV Eindhoven
		Eijkelkamp 48'; Degryse 61', 78'

Amsterdam Arena, Amsterdam
Attendance: 31,000
Referee: Jaap Uilenberg

Ajax	PSV Eindhoven

GK	(Netherlands) Edwin van der Sar
RB	(Netherlands) John Veldman	(substituted off) 83'
CB	(Netherlands) Danny Blind (c)
CB	(Argentina) Mariano Juan
LB	(Netherlands) Frank de Boer
CM	(Netherlands) Arnold Scholten	(substituted off) 46'
CM	(Netherlands) Richard Witschge
AM	(Finland) Jari Litmanen
RW	(Nigeria) Tijani Babangida
CF	(Netherlands) Ronald de Boer
LW	(Netherlands) Peter Hoekstra	(substituted off) 60'
Substitutes:
FW	(Netherlands) Nordin Wooter	(substituted on) 46'
FW	(Netherlands) Rody Turpijn	(substituted on) 60'
DF	(Netherlands) Mario Melchiot	(substituted on) 83'
Manager:
(Netherlands) Louis van Gaal

GK	(Netherlands) Ronald Waterreus
RB	(Brazil) Vampeta
CB	(Netherlands) Ernest Faber		(substituted off) 75'
CB	(Netherlands) Jaap Stam
LB	(Netherlands) Arthur Numan (c)
DM	(Netherlands) Wim Jonk
RM	(Netherlands) Marciano Vink		(substituted off) 70'
LM	(Netherlands) Phillip Cocu
AM	(Belgium) Marc Degryse
CF	(Belgium) Luc Nilis	Booked
CF	(Netherlands) René Eijkelkamp		(substituted off) 80'
Substitutes:
MF	(Federal Republic of Yugoslavia) Željko Petrović		(substituted on) 70'
DF	(Netherlands) Stan Valckx		(substituted on) 75'
FW	(Brazil) Marcelo		(substituted on) 80'
Manager:
(Netherlands) Dick Advocaat
