= Robert Fuchs (footballer) =

Dutch footballer (born 1975)

Personal information
- Date of birth: 15 February 1975 (age 51)
- Place of birth: Eindhoven, Netherlands
- Height: 1.70 m (5 ft 7 in)
- Position: Midfielder

Youth career
- RKSV Woensel
- 1988-1993: PSV

Senior career*
Years	Team	Apps	(Gls)
1993–1995	PSV	8	(0)
1995–1998	De Graafschap	91	(10)
1998–2001	PSV	20	(1)
1999–2001	→ De Graafschap (loan)	29	(8)
2002–2008	RKC	153	(22)
Total		301	(41)

International career
1992-1993	Netherlands U19	9	(1)
1994–1998	Netherlands U21	18	(2)
- * Club domestic league appearances and goals

Robert Fuchs (born 15 February 1975) is a Dutch retired footballer who played as a midfielder.

== Club career ==
Born in Eindhoven, Fuchs made his debut in professional football as part of the PSV squad in the 1993–94 season. He also played for De Graafschap before joining RKC Waalwijk. He retired in 2010, playing at amateur level for DESK from Kaatsheuvel.

== International career ==
Fuchs is a former Netherlands U21 international, having gained 18 caps and scoring two goals between 1994 and 1998. He also played 9 games (1 goal) for the Netherlands national under-19 football team.
