= Erik Meijer (footballer) =

Dutch footballer

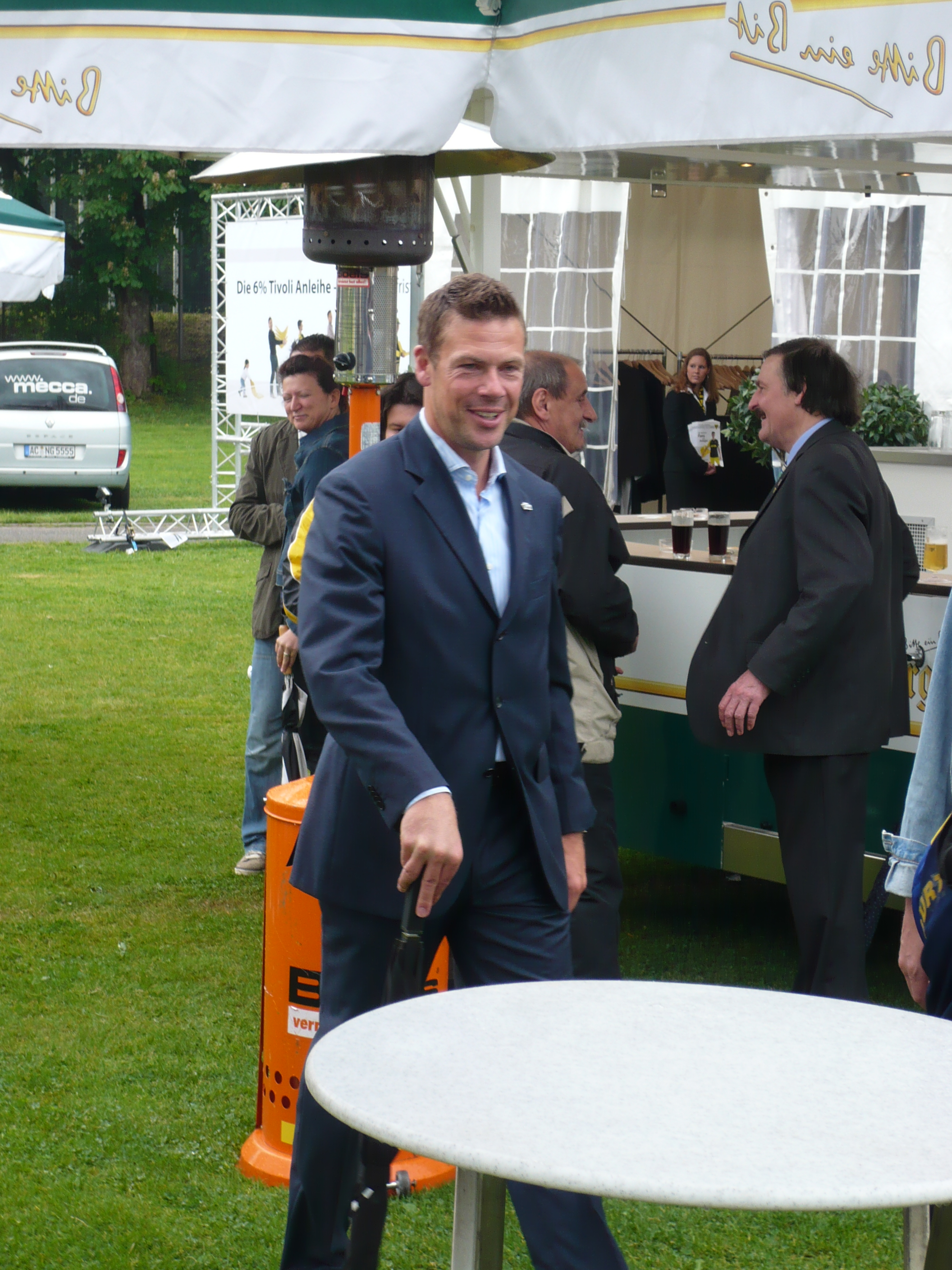
- Meijer in 2008

Personal information
- Date of birth: 2 August 1969 (age 57)
- Place of birth: Meerssen, Netherlands
- Height: 1.89 m (6 ft 2 in)
- Position: Striker

Youth career
- 1984–1985: SV Meerssen
- 1985–1986: MVV
- 1986–1988: Fortuna Sittard

Senior career*
| Years | Team | Apps | (Gls) |
| 1988–1989 | Fortuna Sittard | 14 | (1) |
| 1989–1990 | Royal Antwerp | 0 | (0) |
| 1989–1990 | Eindhoven | 14 | (5) |
| 1990–1991 | Fortuna Sittard | 26 | (5) |
| 1991–1993 | MVV | 66 | (34) |
| 1993–1995 | PSV | 40 | (13) |
| 1995–1996 | Uerdingen 05 | 32 | (11) |
| 1996–1999 | Bayer Leverkusen | 84 | (16) |
| 1999–2000 | Liverpool | 24 | (0) |
| 2000 | → Preston North End (loan) | 9 | (0) |
| 2000–2003 | Hamburger SV | 58 | (11) |
| 2003–2006 | Alemannia Aachen | 92 | (29) |
| Total | | 462 | (117) |

International career
| 1993 | Netherlands | 1 | (0) |

Managerial career
- 2006–2007: Alemannia Aachen (assistant)
- 2010–2012: Alemannia Aachen (sporting director)
- 2014–2019: MVV (assistant)
- * Club domestic league appearances and goals

Erik Meijer (born 2 August 1969) is a Dutch former professional footballer who played as a striker, he was known as a header specialist. He last worked as director of sports for Alemannia Aachen.

== Club career ==
Born in Meerssen, Limburg, Meijer started his career at Fortuna Sittard (1987–89). He broke through in the early 1990s at Dutch Eredivisie club MVV and was transferred to PSV Eindhoven in 1994, where he did not play much due to competition by teammates Ronaldo, Luc Nilis and Wim Kieft.

He then moved to German Bundesliga strugglers Uerdingen 05 in 1995, where he was picked up by Bayer Leverkusen.

After successful years, Meijer moved to Liverpool in 1999, where he failed to make an impression next to Michael Owen and Robbie Fowler. He was therefore loaned out to Preston North End for one season. He returned to the Bundesliga and joined Hamburger SV in December 2000. Meijer scored two goals in his time at Anfield, both coming in a League Cup tie against Hull City. He joined Liverpool fans in Dortmund prior to the 2000–01 UEFA Cup, where he drank and sang with Reds fans. Despite playing a limited number of games for Liverpool, Meijer was voted 99th in the fan-based poll, 100 Players Who Shook The Kop.

But it was only after moving to 2. Bundesliga club Alemannia Aachen, in 2003, where he finally regained success. In the autumn of his career, his strong play and dressing room presence propelled Aachen into the DFB-Pokal finals in 2003–04, losing to Werder Bremen, but earning a ticket into the UEFA Cup (as Bremen were German champions) and rejuvenating Alemannia financially. He was also named captain for the first time in his career. Meijer also was essential for Aachen's promotion into the Bundesliga after 36 years, in 2005–06.

Meijer ended his career that summer, stating he wanted to finish in style after this last big success.

== International career ==
Meijer earned his sole cap for the Netherlands during a 6–0 win against San Marino in 1993.

== Coaching career ==
Meijer took on a post in the management of Alemannia Aachen. But after a very short time he was appointed assistant coach of the newly arrived Bundesliga team, working with Michael Frontzeck, who succeeded Dieter Hecking in September 2006. On 14 December 2009 was named as the new director of sport by his former club Alemannia Aachen and signed a contract between 30 June 2011. He is a patron of A.F.C. Liverpool, a club run by the fans of Liverpool
