= Edward Linskens =

Dutch footballer (born 1968)

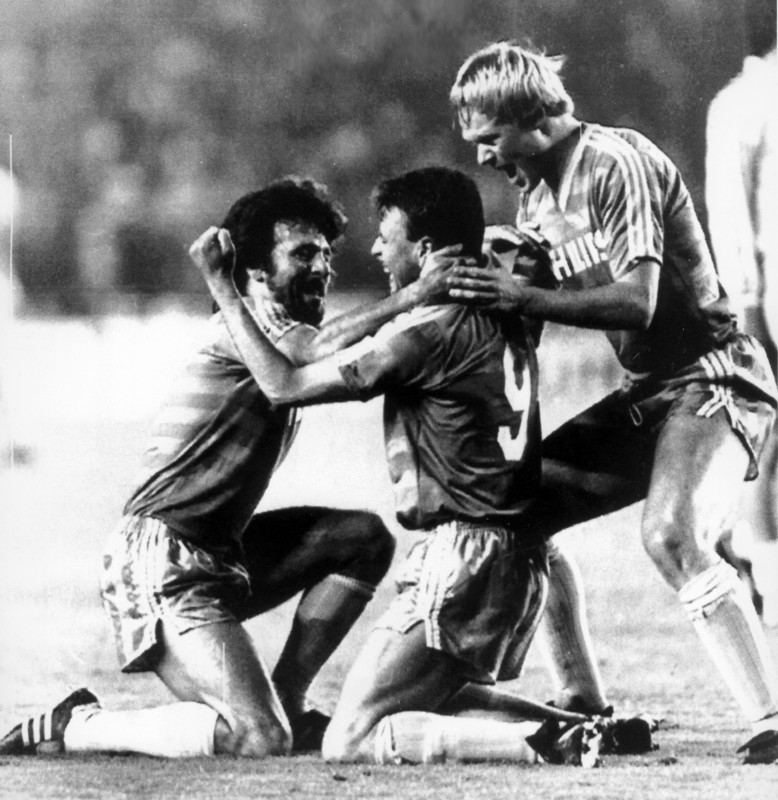
- Linskens (center) after scoring at 1987–88 European Cup Semi-final, Santiago Bernabéu, Madrid

Personal information
- Full name: Edward Linskens
- Date of birth: 6 November 1968 (age 57)
- Place of birth: Venray, Netherlands
- Height: 1.78 m (5 ft 10 in)
- Position: Midfielder

Youth career
- SV Venray

Senior career*
Years	Team	Apps	(Gls)
1987–1995	PSV	136	(18)
1995–1996	NAC	5	(0)
1996–1997	Lokeren	20	(3)
1997–1998	VVV	30	(7)
Total		191	(28)
- * Club domestic league appearances and goals

Edward Linskens (born 6 November 1968) is a Dutch retired footballer who played as a defensive midfielder, mainly for PSV.

== Football career ==
Linskens was born in Venray, Limburg. During his 11-year professional career he played for PSV Eindhoven, NAC Breda, K.S.C. Lokeren Oost-Vlaanderen (Belgium) and VVV-Venlo, the latter club competing in the second division.

At PSV, Linskens was an important first-team element and helped it to the European Cup victory in 1988, by scoring the equalizer in the semi's in the Bernabéu against Madrid and playing the entire final against S.L. Benfica of Portugal, which PSV won on penalties. With the Eindhoven side, he appeared in more than 150 official matches and scored more than 20 goals.
