= Geoffrey Prommayon =

Thai-born Dutch footballer

Personal information
- Date of birth: 25 October 1971 (age 55)
- Place of birth: Udon Thani, Thailand
- Height: 1.68 m (5 ft 6 in)
- Position: Defender

Youth career
- 1983–1990: PSV

Senior career*
Years	Team	Apps	(Gls)
1990–1995	PSV	44	(0)
1991	→ Sparta Rotterdam (loan)	0	(0)
1992–1994	→ FC Eindhoven (loan)	57	(4)
1996–2001	Willem II	137	(1)
2002–2005	FC Eindhoven	39	(1)
2005–2011	Blauw Geel '38		
Total		277	(6)

International career
1988	Netherlands U17	1	(0)
1990	Netherlands U19	5	(0)
- * Club domestic league appearances and goals

Geoffrey Prommayon (born 25 October 1971) is a former professional footballer who played as a defender. Born in Thailand, he represented the Netherlands internationally at youth level.

== Career ==
Prommayon played professional football between 1990 and 2005. He started his career at PSV and was sent on loan to Sparta Rotterdam in early 1991 and later to FC Eindhoven in 1992. From 1994 to December 1995 he played for PSV again. From 1996 to 2001, he played with Willem II in Tilburg. He ended his professional career in 2005 at his former club FC Eindhoven. In total, he made 322 appearances in which he scored seven goals.

After his professional career he started playing football with the amateurs of Blauw Geel '38 from Veghel in the Hoofdklasse. There, he became assistant coach in the 2011–12 season. In 2013, he started playing at PSV/av, the amateur team of PSV, where he retired in 2017. After this, he became an assistant coach at PSV/av, where he occasionally participated as a player.

== Outside football ==
Prommayon has worked for car rental company Hertz since 2005, and resides in Geldrop.

== Personal life ==
=== Family ===
Prommayon was born in Udon Thani, Thailand, to a Thai mother and an American serviceman. His father was recalled to the United States before Prommayon's first birthday. Prommayon moved to the Netherlands with his mother when he was eight. Later in his life, when he was 27, he wrote a letter to the television program Spoorloos asking if they could trace down his father. The program found his biological father, Elmo Blackman, through an American veteran archive and brought him to the Netherlands, where Prommayon subsequently met him for the first time.

=== Legal issues ===
In 2003 he was arrested together with fellow footballers Yassine Abdellaoui and Adil Ramzi, on suspicion of money laundering with a cigar dealer from Breda. In January 2008, Prommayon and Abdellaoui were taken to court. Ramzi was not subsequently not prosecuted. On 28 January 2008 it was announced that Prommayon was no longer suspected of money laundering, but instead of laundering thirty thousand euros. In October 2010, he was acquitted of money laundering by the court, but together with Abdellaoui sentenced to a two-month suspended sentence for laundering $ 38,000 made in dealing MDMA.

== Honours ==
PSV

- Eredivisie: 1990–91, 1991–92
