= René Klomp =

Dutch footballer (born 1974)

René Klomp (born 16 August 1974) is a Dutch former professional footballer who played as a midfielder.

== Career ==
Klomp played for the amateurs of VV Nieuwenhoorn, to end up afterwards for the youth of Sparta Rotterdam, Feyenoord and PSV. During the 1992–93 season he made his debut for PSV and played that season nine games for the head power. The season afterwards he was let to Sparta Rotterdam.

The two seasons afterwards he totally played ona game for PSV. He continued its career in Belgium. He played successively for SK Lommel, KRC Harelbeke and Eendracht Aalst. In 2002, he moved to the Cypriot competition, to play for a year at Ethnikos Achnas. He closed his career finished at the Belgian third class serum KVSK United in 2004.
