= Jürgen Dirkx =

Dutch footballer

Personal information
- Full name: Jürgen Arnoldus Wilhelmus Dirkx
- Date of birth: 15 August 1975 (age 51)
- Place of birth: Reusel, Netherlands
- Height: 1.82 m (6 ft 0 in)
- Position: Centre-back

Team information
- Current team: PSV (assistant)

Youth career
- 1982–1987: Reusel Sport
- 1987–1989: FC Eindhoven
- 1989–1994: PSV

Senior career*
Years	Team	Apps	(Gls)
1994–1996	PSV	19	(1)
1995–1996	→ Fortuna Sittard (loan)	15	(0)
1996–1998	Fortuna Sittard	67	(2)
1998–2003	PSV	41	(2)
2001–2002	→ Fortuna Sittard (loan)	23	(0)

International career
1992–1994	Netherlands U18	17	(0)
1995–1998	Netherlands U21	9	(0)

Managerial career
- 2006–2008: Jong PSV (assistant)
- 2009–2010: RKVV Dommelen
- 2010–2012: VV Geldrop
- 2012–2013: FC Eindhoven (assistant)
- 2012–2013: VV UNA
- 2013–2014: PSV (youth)
- 2014–2018: Jong PSV (assistant)
- 2018–2019: PSV (assistant)
- * Club domestic league appearances and goals

Jürgen Arnoldus Wilhelmus Dirkx (born 15 August 1975), known as Jürgen Dirkx, is a Dutch former professional footballer. During his career, he played as a centre-back for PSV and Fortuna Sittard. After retiring at the age of 27, he became a manager. Currently he is assistant manager of Jong PSV.

== Club career ==
Dirkx started his footballing career at local club Reusel Sport, and also played in the youth teams of FC Eindhoven before moving to PSV. He made his first team debut in the UEFA Cup against Bayer Leverkusen in September 1994. After one season, in which he made 19 Eredivisie appearances and scored one goal, he was loaned to fellow Eredivisie side Fortuna Sittard. One year later, Fortuna signed him on a permanent basis.

In November 1998, Dirkx made an immediate return to PSV, where he was a regular for the rest of the season. As a result of injuries and strong competition for his position, Dirkx appeared more sparingly in the next two seasons. In the 1999–2000 season, he contributed 13 appearances (two goals) as PSV became Eredivisie champions. In the 2000–01 season, he made five appearances (no goals), with PSV once again winning the title.

In August 2001, Dirkx again moved to Fortuna Sittard on loan. He made 23 appearances in a season which ended in relegation to the Eerste Divisie. Dirkx then returned to PSV, making two appearances during the 2002–03 season. At the end of the season, Dirkx was not offered a new contract by PSV, which caused his retirement from professional football at the age of 27.

== International career ==
Dirkx won 17 caps (no goals) for the Netherlands national under-18 football team, and nine caps (no goals) for the under-21 team. He was part of the Netherlands squad which appeared at the final stages of the 1998 UEFA European Under-21 Championship in Romania, playing in all three matches as the Netherlands finished in fourth place.

== Managerial career ==
In 2006, Dirkx started his managerial career at PSV, as youth coach and assistant manager of Jong PSV. In 2009, he was appointed manager of amateur club RKVV Dommelen, who were competing in the Vierde Klasse. He resigned his position in January 2010, and later that year became manager of Eerste Klasse side VV Geldrop. From March 2012, he was also assistant manager at FC Eindhoven.

Dirkx left Geldrop at the end of the 2011–12 season. During the 2012–13 season, he managed Topklasse club VV UNA, while continuing to serve as assistant manager of FC Eindhoven. At the end of the season, Dirkx left both UNA and FC Eindhoven to return to PSV, where he was appointed youth coach. Since 2014, he is assistant manager of Jong PSV.

== Honours ==
PSV

- Eredivisie: 1999–2000, 2000–01, 2002–03
- Johan Cruijff Schaal: 2000
