= Mario van der Ende =

Dutch football referee and coordinator

- Born: March 28, 1956 (age 70); Den Haag, Netherlands
- Other occupation: Referee coordinator

Domestic
Years	League	Role
1987–2002	Dutch Eredivisie	Referee

International
Years	League	Role
1990–2001	FIFA-listed	Referee

Mario van der Ende (born March 28, 1956, in The Hague, South Holland) is a retired football referee and coordinator from the Netherlands. He is mostly known for supervising five matches in the FIFA World Cup: three in 1994 and two in 1998. Van der Ende also officiated one match in the 1996 European Championships, two UEFA Super Cup matches and many in the Champions League. In 1990, he got his FIFA badge as a referee. His hometown is Naarden. On 12 August 2008, Van der Ende was appointed as interim technical director for Australia to replace the outgoing Rob Baan.

Van der Ende retired from FIFA in 2001, due to cancer. He also appointed to retire many times, but he cured so he made a comeback. He still is a referee observer for FIFA and presently works in Australia.
