= Stan Valckx =

Dutch former professional footballer (born 1963)

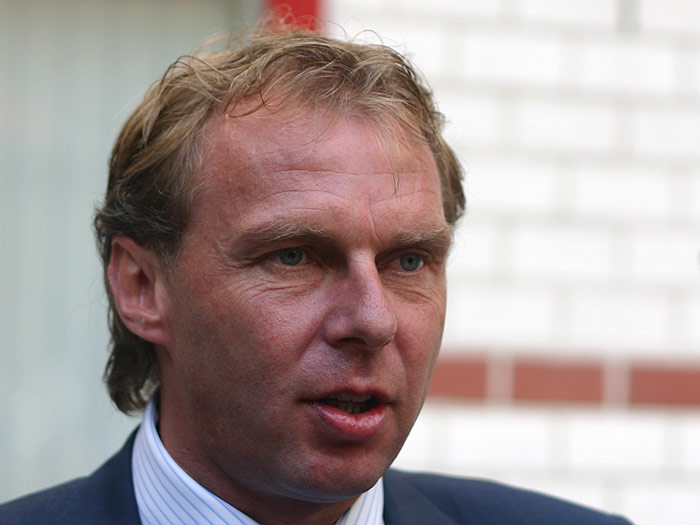

Personal information
- Full name: Stanislaus Henricus Christina Valckx
- Date of birth: 20 October 1963 (age 63)
- Place of birth: Arcen, Netherlands
- Height: 1.81 m (5 ft 11 in)
- Position: Centre back

Youth career
- RKDEV
- VVV

Senior career*
Years	Team	Apps	(Gls)
1983–1988	VVV	145	(15)
1988–1992	PSV	115	(5)
1992–1995	Sporting CP	69	(6)
1995–2000	PSV	106	(4)
Total		435	(30)

International career
1990–1996	Netherlands	20	(0)
- * Club domestic league appearances and goals

Stanislaus "Stan" Henricus Christina Valckx (born 20 October 1963) is a Dutch former professional footballer who played as a central defender.

== Club career ==
Valckx was born in Arcen, Limburg. After starting professionally with VVV-Venlo (second division), he moved in 1988 to Eredivisie club PSV Eindhoven, being instrumental in the conquest of three leagues and two Dutch Cups – in the 1991–92 season, he scored four goals in 28 matches as the team renewed their domestic supremacy.

In 1992, Valckx, aged 28, moved abroad, to Sporting Clube de Portugal, helping the Lisbon side to the Portuguese Cup three years later, although he did not play in the final against C.S. Marítimo as in October 1994 he had already returned to his country and PSV, where he won one more league and another domestic cup before retiring in June 2000 at nearly 37 years of age, with more than 500 official appearances to his credit.

== International career ==
Valckx earned 20 caps for the Netherlands, and was picked for the squad which appeared at the 1994 FIFA World Cup. He contributed with four games, in a quarter-final elimination at the hands of eventual champions Brazil.

Valckx made his debut for his country on 26 September 1990, in a friendly against Italy (0–0).

== Honours ==
=== Club ===
PSV

- Eredivisie: 1988–89, 1990–91, 1991–92, 1996–97, 1999–00
- KNVB Cup: 1988–89, 1989–90, 1995–96
- Johan Cruijff Schaal: 1996, 1997, 1998
- UEFA Super Cup: Runner-up 1988
- Intercontinental Cup: Runner-up 1988

== Post-playing career ==
Subsequently, Valckx began working as a technical director at PSV, a post he occupied for several years. In 2008, he got into a conflict with general manager Jan Reker about the influence and role of player agent Vlado Lemić at the club; the following year, in the same capacity, he joined China's Shanghai Shenhua FC.

In August 2010, Valckx was appointed director of football at Wisła Kraków from Poland. Four years later, he returned to VVV as a technical advisor.
