= Luc Nilis =

Belgian footballer (born 1967)

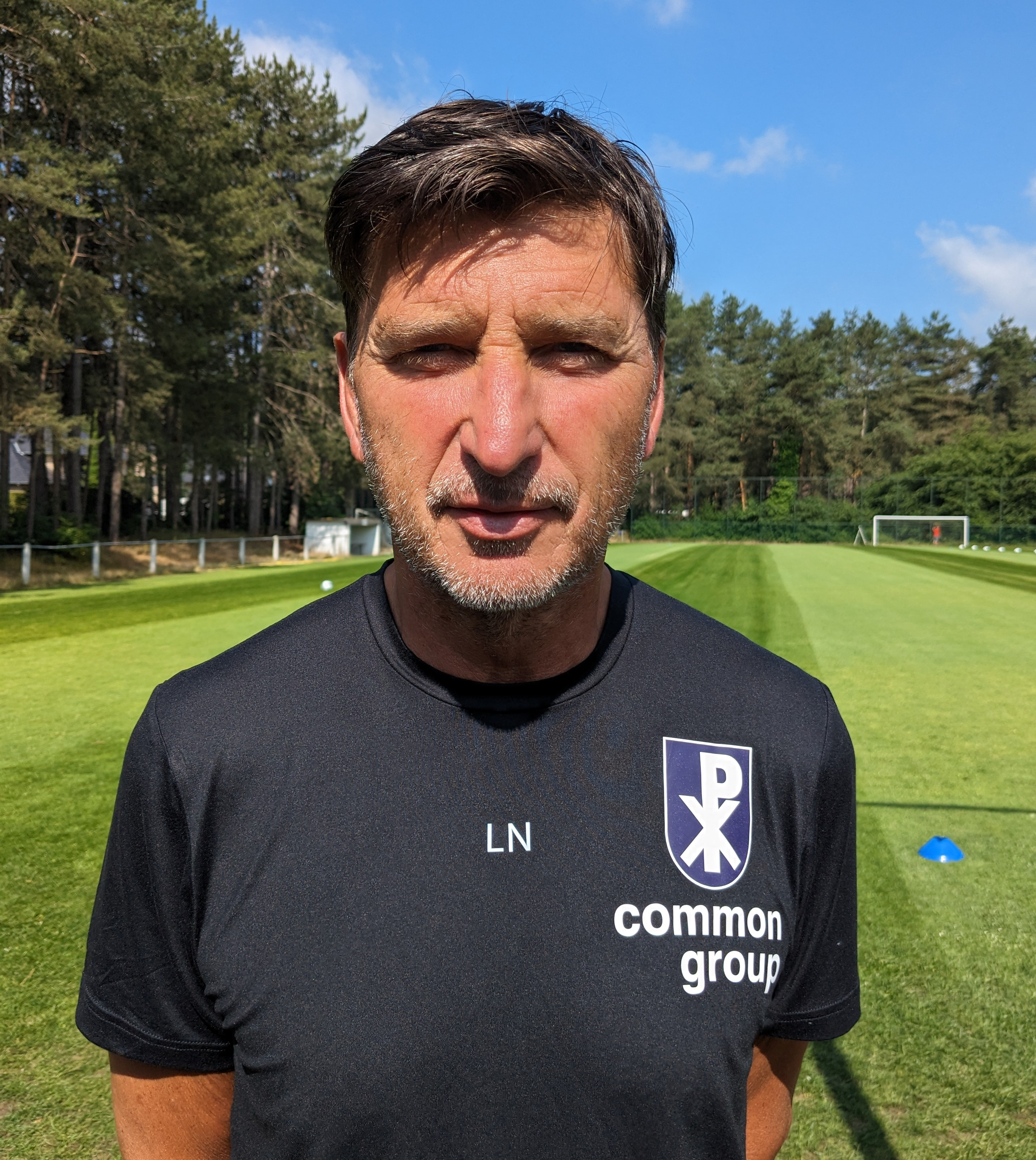
- Nilis in 2023

Personal information
- Full name: Luc Gilbert Cyrille Nilis
- Date of birth: 25 May 1967 (age 59)
- Place of birth: Hasselt, Belgium
- Height: 1.83 m (6 ft 0 in)
- Position: Striker

Team information
- Current team: Patro Eisden (striker coach)

Youth career
- 1973–1980: Halveweg Zonhoven
- 1980–1984: Winterslag

Senior career*
Years	Team	Apps	(Gls)
1984–1986	Winterslag	47	(16)
1986–1994	Anderlecht	223	(124)
1994–2000	PSV	164	(110)
2000–2001	Aston Villa	3	(1)
Total		437	(251)

International career
1982–1983	Belgium U16	6	(3)
1982–1983	Belgium U17	3	(2)
1983–1984	Belgium U18	8	(1)
1983–1985	Belgium U19	11	(6)
1986–1987	Belgium U21	3	(0)
1988–2000	Belgium	56	(10)

Managerial career
- 2007–2010: PSV (assistant)
- 2011: Kasımpaşa (assistant)
- 2011–2013: Gençlerbirliği (assistant)
- 2018–2020: VVV-Venlo (assistant)
- 2021: Jordan (assistant)
- 2021–2022: Belisia Bilzen
- * Club domestic league appearances and goals

Luc Gilbert Cyrille Nilis (born 25 May 1967) is a Belgian professional football manager and former player who is the striker coach of Patro Eisden.

He spent most of his career in his native Belgium and, in particular, in the Netherlands with PSV. His playing days came to an end in the 2000–01 season after breaking his leg in a match with his club Aston Villa following a clash with Ipswich Town goalkeeper Richard Wright.

== Club career ==
His former clubs include Winterslag, Anderlecht, PSV and Aston Villa.

=== Early years ===
As youth player, Nilis was regarded as Winterslag's greatest talent. Standard, Club Brugge and PSV Eindhoven showed interest in the stylish attacker, but under the influence of Raymond Goethals, Nilis was transferred to Anderlecht at the age of 18.

=== Anderlecht ===
Forming a duo with players such as Luís Oliveira or Marc Degryse, he would win several national prizes in the next seasons. Although he was not considered as a very quick football player, his scoring ability and excellent striking technique stood out. Long, placed distance shots with both left and right feet became his hallmark.

=== PSV Eindhoven ===
Having left Anderlecht for Eindhoven in 1994, Nilis topped the Dutch scoring charts in the 1995–96 season, plundering 21 goals. He continued that form into 1996–97 – leading the pack by December 1996 with 13 – before matching his previous total, in a season that ended with PSV winning the league title for the first time in five years. In late 1997, Nilis scored thrice in three games over a fifteen-day period, all against Shay Given; with a goal at Newcastle United in the 1997–98 UEFA Champions League group stage coming in between goals for Belgium against the Republic of Ireland. During his time with PSV, Nilis formed one of the deadliest partnerships in Europe with team-mate Ruud van Nistelrooy, who signed for PSV in 1998. In the 1998–99 season, Nilis and van Nistelrooy scored 55 league goals between them. Van Nistelrooy finished as top-scorer, Nilis came second. In the following season, Nilis' last for PSV, they scored 48 league goals between them.

=== Aston Villa ===
After six years in the Netherlands, Nilis joined Aston Villa on a Bosman transfer in June 2000. Nilis' Villa career started well, as he scored on his debut in the UEFA Intertoto Cup against Dukla Příbram on 22 July 2000 before going on to score on his league debut against Chelsea on 27 August 2000. In a league match against Ipswich Town on 9 September 2000, Nilis was involved in a clash with goalkeeper Richard Wright that left him with a double compound fracture of his right shin. At one point, the injury became infected and Nilis even feared a possible amputation. This hypothesis was later ruled out, although his playing career was effectively ended.

== International career ==
Nilis played 56 times for the Belgium national team, scoring ten times. A prolific goalscorer with his clubs, he scored his first goal for Belgium only on his 24th cap (a 9–0 win against Zambia).

Nilis played in the FIFA World Cups in 1994 and 1998. Qualification for the latter was sealed with Nilis' goals in each leg of Belgium's playoff against the Republic of Ireland. Nilis dropped out of international football after the 1998 Finals, reportedly in response to an "unhealthy atmosphere within the squad and their lack of achievement". However, with control of the Belgian national side having changed, Nilis returned to the international fold in November 1999, in time for Euro 2000, co-hosted by his birth-country Belgium and the Netherlands.

== Coaching career ==
After his playing career ended, Beringen-Heusden-Zolder were his next port of call, becoming technical director in 2005, not long before the club's liquidation after financial difficulties. Nilis took a job with PSV, first as a scout, and then training the club's forwards. In January 2011, Nilis became assistant manager with Turkish club Kasımpaşa, followed by another assistant manager stint with Gençlerbirliği, also in Turkey. In April 2015, he was re-hired by PSV as a striker coach.

In August 2021, Nilis became the head coach of Belgian Division 2 club Belisia Bilzen, which had been founded earlier that year from a merger between Spouwen-Mopertingen and Bilzerse Waltwilder. It was his first assignment as head coach. In the round of 16 of the Belgian Cup, Belisia were drawn against Gent. At the end of October 2021, they lost that cup match 4–0. In addition to his position as manager of Belisia Bilzen, Nilis was also hired as striker coach at the Talent Academy of Genk on 10 March 2022.

In 2023, he was appointed striker coach of Patro Eisden.

== Personal life ==
Nilis's father, Roger (1938–2011), played as a professional footballer in Belgium in the 1960s. His son Arne was a youth player for Genk and PSV Eindhoven but was unable to pursue a professional career, mainly due to injuries and a gambling addiction.

== Legacy ==
Ronaldo names Nilis as the best strike partner he played with, despite sharing only a brief time with him at PSV. Ruud van Nistelrooy has also stated on several occasions that the Belgian was one of the best players, if not the best, he had ever played with.

Despite the lack of a major international career, the technically skilled attacker is still praised by football fans and journalists in the low countries. In 2020, he was named in the "Best squad of all time", of both Anderlecht and PSV Eindhoven.

== Career statistics ==
=== Club ===
Appearances and goals by club, season and competition
Club	Season	League			National cup (Note: Includes Belgian Cup, KNVB Cup, FA Cup)		League cup (Note: Includes League Cup)		Europe		Other		Total	
Club	Season	Division	Apps	Goals	Apps	Goals	Apps	Goals	Apps	Goals	Apps	Goals	Apps	Goals
Winterslag	1984–85	Belgian Second Division	22	5			—		—		—		22	5
Winterslag	1985–86	Belgian Second Division	25	11			—		—		—		25	11
Winterslag	Total		47	16			—		—		—		47	16
Anderlecht	1986–87	Belgian First Division	16	5			—		3 (Note: Appearances in European Cup)	1	—		19	6
Anderlecht	1987–88	Belgian First Division	32	14			—		6	1	—		38	15
Anderlecht	1988–89	Belgian First Division	33	19			—		4 (Note: Appearances in European Cup Winners' Cup)	0	—		37	19
Anderlecht	1989–90	Belgian First Division	27	9			—		9	4	—		36	13
Anderlecht	1990–91	Belgian First Division	30	19			—		6 (Note: Appearances in UEFA Cup)	3	—		36	22
Anderlecht	1991–92	Belgian First Division	27	15			—		9	6			36	21
Anderlecht	1992–93	Belgian First Division	28	19			—		6	4	—		34	23
Anderlecht	1993–94	Belgian First Division	30	24			—		9 (Note: Appearances in UEFA Champions League)	7			39	31
Anderlecht	Total		223	124			—		52	26			275	150
PSV	1994–95	Eredivisie	30	12	1	0	—		2	1	—		33	13
PSV	1995–96	Eredivisie	31	21	5	5	—		8	5	—		44	31
PSV	1996–97	Eredivisie	26	21	2	3	—		4 (Note: Appearances in UEFA Cup Winners' Cup)	2	1 (Note: Appearance in Johan Cruyff Shield)	0	33	26
PSV	1997–98	Eredivisie	24	13	3	3	—		5	1	—		32	17
PSV	1998–99	Eredivisie	27	24	4	1	—		5	0	—		36	25
PSV	1999–2000	Eredivisie	26	19	1	0	—		7	2	—		34	21
PSV	Total		164	110	16	12	—		31	11	1	0	212	133
Aston Villa	2000–01	Premier League	3	1	0	0	0	0	2 (Note: Appearances in UEFA Intertoto Cup)	1	—		5	2
Career total			437	251	16	12	0	0	85	38	1	0	539	301

=== International ===
Scores and results list Belgium's goal tally first, score column indicates score after each Nilis goal.

List of international goals scored by Luc Nilis
No.	Date	Venue	Opponent	Score	Result	Competition
1	4 June 1994	Heysel Stadium, Brussels, Belgium	Zambia	5–0	9–0	Friendly
2	8 August 1994	Heysel Stadium, Brussels, Belgium	Hungary	3–1	3–1	Friendly
3	7 October 1995	Hrazdan Stadium, Yerevan, Armenia	Armenia	1–0	2–0	UEFA Euro 1996 qualifying
4	7 October 1995	Hrazdan Stadium, Yerevan, Armenia	Armenia	2–0	2–0	UEFA Euro 1996 qualifying
5	9 October 1996	Stadio Olimpico, Serravalle, San Marino	San Marino	2–0	3–0	FIFA World Cup 1998 qualifying
6	9 October 1996	Stadio Olimpico, Serravalle, San Marino	San Marino	3–0	3–0	FIFA World Cup 1998 qualifying
7	29 October 1997	Lansdowne Road, Dublin, Republic of Ireland	Ireland	1–1	1–1	FIFA World Cup 1998 qualifying
8	15 November 1997	King Baudouin Stadium, Brussels, Belgium	Ireland	2–1	2–1	FIFA World Cup 1998 qualifying
9	22 April 1998	King Baudouin Stadium, Brussels, Belgium	Romania	1–1	1–1	Friendly
10	25 June 1998	Parc des Princes, Paris, France	South Korea	1–0	1–1	FIFA World Cup 1998

== Honours ==
Anderlecht

- Belgian First Division: 1986–87, 1990–91, 1992–93, 1993–94
- Belgian Cup: 1988–89, 1989–90, 1993–94
- Belgian Supercup: 1987, 1993
- European Cup Winners' Cup runner-up: 1989–90
- Bruges Matins: 1988

PSV

- Eredivisie: 1996–97, 1999–2000
- KNVB Cup: 1995–96; runner-up: 1997–98
- Johan Cruyff Shield: 1996, 1997, 1998

Individual

- Belgian Bronze Shoe: 1990, 1991
- Dutch Eredivisie Footballer of the Year: 1995
- Belgian Professional Footballer of the Year: 1995–96
- Eredivisie Top Scorer: 1995–96 (21 goals), 1996–97 (21 goals)
- Golden Shoe Lifetime Achievement Award: 2001
- AD The Best PSV Team Ever: 2020
- DH The Best RSC Anderlecht Team Ever: 2020
- Pro League Hall of Fame: 2024
