= Peter Hoekstra (footballer) =

Dutch footballer

Personal information
- Full name: Peter Martin Hoekstra
- Date of birth: 4 April 1973 (age 53)
- Place of birth: Assen, Netherlands
- Height: 1.91 m (6 ft 3 in)
- Position: Left winger

Youth career
- ACV
- 1990: PSV

Senior career*
Years	Team	Apps	(Gls)
1991–1996	PSV	90	(21)
1996–2001	Ajax	68	(14)
1999–2000	→ Compostela (loan)	27	(0)
2000–2001	→ Groningen (loan)	14	(1)
2001–2004	Stoke City	78	(11)
Total		277	(47)

International career
1987	Netherlands U15	1	(0)
1988	Netherlands U16	4	(0)
1989	Netherlands U17	3	(0)
1991-1995	Netherlands U21	22	(4)
1996	Netherlands	5	(0)
- * Club domestic league appearances and goals

Peter Martin Hoekstra (Dutch pronunciation: [ˈpeːtər ˈɦukstraː]; born 4 April 1973) is a Dutch retired footballer who played as a left winger for PSV Eindhoven, Ajax and Stoke City. Capped five times by the Netherlands national team, he was a member of the Dutch squad at Euro 1996 in England under manager Guus Hiddink.

== Club career ==
Born in Assen, Hoekstra started his career at local amateur side ACV before joining PSV where he played for five years, making over 100 appearances for the club. Ajax Amsterdam signed him for £2m in 1996 to replace Marc Overmars. Injuries halted his career at Ajax and he was loaned out to Spanish side SD Compostela in 1999 and Dutch side FC Groningen in 2000.

Hoekstra made a total of 68 league appearances in five years with Ajax before signing with English Second Division side Stoke City in August 2001. Hoekstra's skill caused problems for many defences in English football's third tier and he was often subject to heavy tackles from opponents. He made 28 appearances for Stoke in 2001–02 helping them gain promotion in the 2002 play-off final. He scored three goals that season against Notts County and twice against Chesterfield. In 2002–03 Stoke battled against relegation from the First Division and Hoekstra's experience proved to be a vital asset, playing in 33 matches scoring five goals including a brace against Watford and a winning goal against Preston North End. In 2003–04 Hoekstra played 27 times scoring four goals including a hat-trick against Reading. In May 2004, aged just 31, he was forced to retire due to a buildup of injuries.

He was voted as the best Stoke player to play in the first ten years at the Britannia Stadium in 2008. He is now a youth coach at FC Groningen with whom he made a visit to Stoke in April 2011.

== International career ==
Hoekstra played 22 games for the Netherlands national under-21 football team and made his debut for the senior Netherlands national team on 24 April 1996 in a friendly against Germany (1–0 loss) in Rotterdam. He was then selected to play for the Netherlands in the 1996 European Championship in England. Hoekstra played five times for his country, without scoring a goal.

== Career statistics ==
=== Club ===
Appearances and goals by club, season and competition
Club	Season	League			National cup		League cup		Total	
Club	Season	Division	Apps	Goals	Apps	Goals	Apps	Goals	Apps	Goals
PSV Eindhoven	1991–92	Eredivisie	14	3	1	0	—		15	3
PSV Eindhoven	1992–93	Eredivisie	19	0	2	0	—		21	0
PSV Eindhoven	1993–94	Eredivisie	23	6	2	1	—		25	7
PSV Eindhoven	1994–95	Eredivisie	19	6	1	0	—		20	6
PSV Eindhoven	1995–96	Eredivisie	15	6	1	0	—		16	6
PSV Eindhoven	Total		90	21	7	1	—		97	22
Ajax	1995–96	Eredivisie	16	5	2	0	—		18	5
Ajax	1996–97	Eredivisie	8	0	0	0	—		8	0
Ajax	1997–98	Eredivisie	23	3	4	0	—		27	3
Ajax	1998–99	Eredivisie	21	6	2	1	—		23	7
Ajax	Total		68	14	8	1	—		76	15
SD Compostela (loan)	1999–2000	Segunda División	27	0	—		—		27	0
FC Groningen (loan)	2000–01	Eredivisie	14	1	—		—		14	1
Stoke City	2001–02	Second Division	24	3	3	0	1	0	28	3
Stoke City	2002–03	First Division	30	4	2	1	1	0	33	5
Stoke City	2003–04	First Division	24	4	2	0	1	0	27	4
Stoke City	Total		78	11	7	1	3	0	88	12
Career total			277	47	22	3	3	0	302	50

=== International ===
Appearances and goals by national team and year
National team	Year	Apps	Goals
Netherlands	1996	5	0
Total		5	0
