= 1996–97 PSV Eindhoven season =

PSV Eindhoven
1996–97 season
- Chairman: Harry van Raaij
- Manager: Dick Advocaat
- Stadium: Philips Stadion
- Eredivisie: Winners
- KNVB Cup: Round of 16
- UEFA Cup Winners' Cup: Second round
- Johan Cruyff Shield: Winners
- Top goalscorer: League: Luc Nilis (21); All: Luc Nilis (26)
- Highest home attendance: 30,000
- Average home league attendance: 28,094
Home colours	Away colours

During the 1996–97 Dutch football season, PSV Eindhoven competed in the Eredivisie. During that season, they won their 14th league title, as well as the Johan Cruyff Shield. They also competed in both that years KNVB Cup and UEFA Cup Winners' Cup.

== Squad ==
Squad at the start of season

Note: Flags indicate national team as defined under FIFA eligibility rules; some limited exceptions apply. Players may hold more than one non-FIFA nationality.

No.	Pos.	Nation	Player
—	GK	NED	Ronald Waterreus
—	GK	NED	Jan Willem van Ede
—	GK	NED	Wilburt Need
—	DF	NED	Chris van der Weerden
—	DF	DEN	Niclas Jensen
—	DF	NED	Wilfred Bouma
—	DF	NED	Jaap Stam
—	DF	NED	Stan Valckx
—	DF	NED	Ernest Faber
—	DF	NED	Arthur Numan (captain)
—	DF	YUG	Željko Petrović
—	MF	NED	Phillip Cocu
—	MF	NED	Wim Jonk
—	MF	BRA	Vampeta
—	MF	NED	Boudewijn Zenden

No.	Pos.	Nation	Player
—	MF	NED	Marciano Vink
—	MF	NED	Björn van der Doelen
—	MF	ROU	Ovidiu Stîngă
—	MF	DEN	Anders Nielsen
—	MF	DEN	Dennis Rommedahl
—	MF	NED	Tommie van der Leegte
—	FW	BRA	Cláudio
—	FW	BEL	Luc Nilis
—	FW	BRA	Marcelo Ramos
—	FW	BEL	Marc Degryse
—	FW	NED	René Eijkelkamp
—	FW	BEL	Gilles De Bilde
—	FW	NED	Boudewijn Pahlplatz
—	FW	ISL	Eiður Guðjohnsen

== Transfers ==
=== In ===
Position	Player	From	Type	Fee	Date	Ref.
FW	(Brazil) Marcelo Ramos	(Brazil) Cruzeiro	Transfer	€5.00M	1 July 1996	
MF	(Romania) Ovidiu Stîngă	(Spain) Salamanca	Transfer	€1.83M	1 July 1996	
DF	(Denmark) Niclas Jensen	(Denmark) Lyngby	Transfer	Free	1 July 1996	
FW	(Belgium) Marc Degryse	(England) Sheffield Wednesday	Transfer		1 July 1996	
MF	(Denmark) Anders Nielsen	(Denmark) Lyngby	Transfer		1 July 1996	
FW	(Brazil) Cláudio		Transfer		1 July 1996	
GK	(Netherlands) Jan Willem van Ede	(Netherlands) Utrecht	Transfer		1 July 1996	
DF	(Socialist Federal Republic of Yugoslavia) Željko Petrović	(Netherlands) RKC Waalwijk	Transfer		1 July 1996	
MF	(Denmark) Dennis Rommedahl	(Denmark) Lyngby	Transfer		1 January 1997	
FW	(Belgium) Gilles De Bilde	(Belgium) Anderlecht	Transfer		1 January 1997	

=== Out ===
Position	Player	To	Type	Fee	Date	Ref.
GK	(Netherlands) Stanley Menzo	(Belgium) Lierse	Transfer		1 July 1996	
MF	(Netherlands) René Klomp	(Belgium) Lommel	Transfer		1 July 1996	
FW	(Brazil) Ronaldo	(Spain) Barcelona	Transfer	€15.00M	17 July 1996	
FW	(Netherlands) Boudewijn Pahlplatz	(Netherlands) Heerenveen	Transfer		1 January 1997	

=== Loaned out ===
Position	Player	To	Type	Fee	Start	End	Ref.
DF	(Netherlands) Wilfred Bouma	(Netherlands) MVV Maastricht	Loan transfer		1 July 1996	30 June 1997	
MF	(Netherlands) Tommie van der Leegte	(Netherlands) RKC Waalwijk	Loan transfer		November 1996	30 June 1997	

== Competitions ==
Competition	First match	Last match	Starting round	Final position	Record							
Competition	First match	Last match	Starting round	Final position	Pld	W	D	L	GF	GA	GD	Win %
Eredivisie	22 August 1996	1 June 1997	Matchday 1	Winners	34	24	5	5	90	26	+64	70.59
KNVB Cup	27 November 1996	12 February 1997	First Round	Round of 16	2	1	0	1	4	4	+0	50.00
UEFA Cup Winners' Cup	12 September 1996	31 October 1996	First Round	Second Round	4	1	2	1	7	5	+2	25.00
Johan Cruyff Shield	18 August 1996		Final	Winners	1	1	0	0	3	0	+3	100.00
Total					41	27	7	7	104	35	+69	65.85

Source: Competitions

=== Johan Cruyff Shield ===
18 August 1996 Final	Ajax	0–3	PSV Eindhoven	Amsterdam
CEST (UTC+2)		Report	Eijkelkamp 48'; Degryse 61', 78'; Nilis (yellow card)	Stadium: Amsterdam Arena; Attendance: 31,000; Referee: Jaap Uilenberg

=== Eredivisie ===
==== League table ====
Pos	Team	Pld	W	D	L	GF	GA	GD	Pts	Qualification or relegation
1	PSV (C)	34	24	5	5	90	26	+64	77	Qualification to Champions League group stage
2	Feyenoord	34	22	7	5	67	34	+33	73	Qualification to Champions League second qualifying round
3	FC Twente	34	20	5	9	60	33	+27	65	Qualification to UEFA Cup first round
4	Ajax	34	17	10	7	55	31	+24	61	Qualification to UEFA Cup first round
5	Vitesse	34	15	10	9	53	41	+12	55	Qualification to UEFA Cup first round

(C) Champions

==== Results summary ====
Overall								Home						Away					
Pld	W	D	L	GF	GA	GD	Pts	W	D	L	GF	GA	GD	W	D	L	GF	GA	GD
34	24	5	5	90	26	+64	77	15	1	1	61	9	+52	9	4	4	29	17	+12

Source: Eredivisie

==== Results by round ====
Round	1	2	3	4	5	6	7	8	9	10	11	12	13	14	15	16	17	18	19	20	21	22	23	24	25	26	27	28	29	30	31	32	33	34
Ground	A	H	A	H	H	A	H	A	H	A	H	A	H	A	H	A	A	H	H	A	A	H	A	A	H	H	A	H	H	A	A	H	H	A
Result	W	W	W	W	W	L	D	D	W	D	W	W	W	W	W	L	W	W	W	W	L	W	W	D	W	L	D	W	W	W	W	W	W	L
Position	1	1	1	1	1	2	2	2	2	2	1	1	1	1	1	1	1	1	1	1	1	1	1	1	1	1	1	1	1	1	1	1	1	1

Source: Eredivisie
A = Away; H = Home; W = Win; D = Draw; L = Loss

==== Matches ====
22 August 1996 1	NEC	1–4	PSV Eindhoven	Nijmegen
CEST (UTC+2)	van Eijkeren 16'	Report	Numan 12'; Nilis 43'; Cocu 54', 67'	Stadium: De Goffert; Attendance: 9,000; Referee: Roelof Luinge

25 August 1996 2	PSV Eindhoven	4–1	Groningen	Eindhoven
CEST (UTC+2)	Sørensen 33' (o.g.); Nilis 64', 81'; Petrović 79'	Report	Gorré 7'; Sion (red card) 57'; Lodewijks (yellow card); Veenhof (yellow card) de Kruyff (yellow card); Sørensen (yellow card) van Wattum (yellow card)	Stadium: Philips Stadion; Attendance: 27,500; Referee: Dick Jol

28 August 1996 3	Volendam	1–3	PSV Eindhoven	Volendam
CEST (UTC+2)	Jongsma 85'; Plugboer (yellow card); Govedarica (yellow card)	Report	Marcelo Ramos 19', 47', 56'; Numan (yellow card)	Stadium: Kras Stadion; Attendance: 4,500; Referee: René Temmink

5 September 1996 4	PSV Eindhoven	4–0	RKC Waalwijk	Eindhoven
CEST (UTC+2)	Nilis 37', 41', 61'; Eijkelkamp 59'	Report	Hutten (yellow card)	Stadium: Philips Stadion; Attendance: 26,500; Referee: Herman van Dijk

8 September 1996 5	PSV Eindhoven	5–0	NAC	Eindhoven
CEST (UTC+2)	Eijkelkamp 23', 36'; Jonk 48', 72'; Degryse 65' van der Weerden (yellow card)	Report	van Galen (yellow card)	Stadium: Philips Stadion; Attendance: 26,500; Referee: Jaap Uilenberg

15 September 1996 6	De Graafschap	2–1	PSV Eindhoven	Doetinchem
CEST (UTC+2)	Ali Ibrahim Pelé 48'; Viscaal 69'; Schultz (yellow card)	Report	Marcelo Ramos 78'	Stadium: De Vijverberg; Attendance: 8,500; Referee: Dick Jol

22 September 1996 7	PSV Eindhoven	0–0	Vitesse	Eindhoven
CEST (UTC+2)	Numan (yellow card); Petrović (yellow card); Vampeta (yellow card)	Report	Westerveld (yellow card); Bos (yellow card); Goossen (yellow card)	Stadium: Philips Stadion; Attendance: 27,700; Referee: René Temmink

29 September 1996 8	Utrecht	2–2	PSV Eindhoven	Utrecht
CEST (UTC+2)	Mols 20' van Loen 34'; Nascimento (yellow card); Robbemond (yellow card) de Jong (yellow card)	Report	Stam 19' (yellow card); Nilis 69'; Cocu (yellow card); Jonk (yellow card)	Stadium: Stadion Nieuw Galgenwaard; Attendance: 10,000; Referee: Mario van der Ende

8 October 1996 9	PSV Eindhoven	2–0	Twente	Eindhoven
CEST (UTC+2)	Cocu 57'; Zenden 84'; Numan (yellow card)	Report	Hoogma (yellow card) (yellow-red card) 37' van Halst (yellow card); Ayupov (yellow card) ter Avest (yellow card)	Stadium: Philips Stadion; Attendance: 26,800; Referee: Roelof Luinge

11 October 1996 10	Fortuna Sittard	1–1	PSV Eindhoven	Sittard-Geleen
CEST (UTC+2)	van der Weert 78'	Report	Waterreus (red card) 26'; Petrović 84' (yellow card); Numan (yellow card)	Stadium: De Baandert; Attendance: 7,000; Referee: Wout Schaap

20 October 1996 11	PSV Eindhoven	7–2	Feyenoord	Eindhoven
CEST (UTC+2)	Jonk 38'; Nilis 44' (pen.) (yellow card); Cocu 50', 67'; Zenden 61'; Pahlplatz 76'; Degryse 81'	Report	Larsson 2'; Boateng (red card) 44' de Goey (yellow card); Graff (yellow card) van Gastel (yellow card); Schuiteman (yellow card); Vos (yellow card)	Stadium: Philips Stadion; Attendance: 20,000; Referee: Mario van der Ende

23 October 1996 12	Heerenveen	0–1	PSV Eindhoven	Heerenveen
CEST (UTC+2)	de Visser (yellow card)	Report	Nilis 29' (pen.)	Stadium: Abe Lenstra Stadion; Attendance: 13,600; Referee: Dick Jol

26 October 1996 13	PSV Eindhoven	8–0	Roda JC	Eindhoven
CEST (UTC+2)	Numan 7'; Zenden 28', 74'; Vampeta 40'; Vink 50'; Nilis 52'; Marcelo Ramos 81'; Petrović 85'; Valckx (yellow card)	Report	Luijpers (yellow card); Ooijer (yellow card); Martens (yellow card)	Stadium: Philips Stadion; Attendance: 28,100; Referee: Jan Wegereef

3 November 1996 14	Twente	1–2	PSV Eindhoven	Enschede
CET (UTC+1)	Hoogma 11' van Halst (yellow card)	Report	Nilis 23'; Jonk 83'	Stadium: Diekman Stadion; Attendance: 8,745; Referee: Jef van Vliet

14 November 1996 15	PSV Eindhoven	2–1	Sparta Rotterdam	Eindhoven
CET (UTC+1)	Stam 45'; Marcelo Ramos 64'	Report	van der Hoeven 10'; Renfurm (red card) 85'	Stadium: Philips Stadion; Attendance: 26,900; Referee: Jaap Uilenberg

17 November 1996 16	Willem II	1–0	PSV Eindhoven	Tilburg
CET (UTC+1)	Konterman 74'; Kolkka (yellow card)	Report	Vink (yellow card); Eijkelkamp (yellow card)	Stadium: Willem II Stadion; Attendance: 10,500; Referee: Hans Reygwart

24 November 1996 17	AZ Alkmaar	0–2	PSV Eindhoven	Alkmaar
CET (UTC+1)	Snijders (yellow card)	Report	Marcelo Ramos 7'; Stam 38'; Numan (yellow card); Nilis (yellow card)	Stadium: Alkmaarderhout; Attendance: 8,609; Referee: René Temmink

30 November 1996 18	PSV Eindhoven	4–1	NEC	Eindhoven
CET (UTC+1)	Marcelo Ramos 39'; Nilis 74' (pen.), 82'; Zenden 90'	Report	van Eijkeren 48' (yellow card); Crüden (red card) 71'; Sobiech (yellow card)	Stadium: Philips Stadion; Attendance: 27,300; Referee: Dick van Egmond

7 December 1996 19	PSV Eindhoven	6–0	Volendam	Eindhoven
CET (UTC+1)	Marcelo Ramos 17', 38'; Nilis 49'; Petrović 58', 69'; Vampeta 74'	Report	Aandewiel (yellow card); Nijholt (yellow card); Steur (yellow card)	Stadium: Philips Stadion; Attendance: 27,400; Referee: Roelof Luinge

22 December 1996 20	Ajax	0–2	PSV Eindhoven	Amsterdam
CET (UTC+1)	Márcio Santos (red card) 54'; Juan (yellow card)	Report	Jonk 43'; Nilis 90'; Stam (yellow card); Valckx (yellow card)	Stadium: Amsterdam Arena; Attendance: 51,200; Referee: Dick Jol

16 February 1997 21	Vitesse	1–0	PSV Eindhoven	Arnhem
CET (UTC+1)	Jochemsen 81'; Goossen (yellow card); Vierklau (yellow card) van den Brom (yellow card)	Report	Valckx (yellow card); Cocu (yellow card)	Stadium: Nieuw Monnikenhuize; Attendance: 8,607; Referee: Jan Wegereef

22 February 1997 22	PSV Eindhoven	2–1	AZ Alkmaar	Eindhoven
CET (UTC+1)	Zenden 11'; Jonk 65' (pen.); Petrović (red card) 81'	Report	Gillhaus 73'; Bociek (red card) 81'; Durmuşoğlu (yellow card); Buskermolen (yellow card); Huiberts (yellow card)	Stadium: Philips Stadion; Attendance: 28,100; Referee: Hans Reygwart

2 March 1997 23	RKC Waalwijk	1–4	PSV Eindhoven	Waalwijk
CET (UTC+1)	Hill 39' van der Leegte (yellow card)	Report	Stam 10', 89' (yellow card); Vink 31'; Marcelo Ramos 36'; Vampeta (yellow card)	Stadium: Sportpark Olympia; Attendance: 7,500; Referee: Roelof Luinge

9 March 1997 24	Feyenoord	0–0	PSV Eindhoven	Rotterdam
CET (UTC+1)	Picun (yellow card)	Report	Numan (yellow card); Stam (yellow card); Petrović (yellow card)	Stadium: De Kuip; Attendance: 42,000; Referee: Dick Jol

15 March 1997 25	PSV Eindhoven	1–0	Fortuna Sittard	Eindhoven
CET (UTC+1)	Jonk 56' (pen.)	Report	Loontjens (yellow card); Burke (yellow card)	Stadium: Philips Stadion; Attendance: 28,200; Referee: Dick van Egmond

22 March 1997 26	PSV Eindhoven	1–0	Heerenveen	Eindhoven
CET (UTC+1)	Jonk (yellow card) (yellow-red card) 80'; Stîngă (yellow card)	Report	Tomasson 40' (yellow card); Vonk (yellow card); Echteld (yellow card)	Stadium: Philips Stadion; Attendance: 29,300; Referee: Harry van Beek

6 April 1997 27	NAC	2–2	PSV Eindhoven	Breda
CEST (UTC+2)	Arambasic 28'; Brood 29'; Vidmar (yellow card); Gaasbeek (yellow card); Jalink (yellow card) van Galen (yellow card)	Report	Zenden 18'; De Bilde 53'; Petrović (yellow card)	Stadium: FUJiFILM-Stadion; Attendance: 14,521; Referee: Mario van der Ende

13 April 1997 28	PSV Eindhoven	2–0	Ajax	Eindhoven
CEST (UTC+2)	Cocu 15'; De Bilde 54'	Report		Stadium: Philips Stadion; Attendance: 28,500; Referee: Jaap Uilenberg

19 April 1997 29	PSV Eindhoven	5–0	De Graafschap	Eindhoven
CEST (UTC+2)	Cocu 1' (yellow card); Nilis 5' (pen.), 15'; Stam 43'; Jonk 68'; Vampeta (yellow card)	Report	Wilnis (yellow card)	Stadium: Philips Stadion; Attendance: 29,200; Referee: René Temmink

7 May 1997 30	Sparta Rotterdam	1–3	PSV Eindhoven	Rotterdam
CEST (UTC+2)	de Nooijer 34'	Report	Cocu 24'; De Bilde 58', 87'	Stadium: Stadion Spangen; Attendance: 8,000; Referee: Jan Wegereef

11 May 1997 31	Groningen	0–1	PSV Eindhoven	Groningen
CEST (UTC+2)	Huizingh (yellow card)	Report	Valckx 56'; Numan (yellow card); Stam (yellow card)	Stadium: Oosterpark; Attendance: 13,200; Referee: Hans Reygwart

17 May 1997 32	PSV Eindhoven	6–1	Utrecht	Eindhoven
CEST (UTC+2)	De Bilde 6', 54'; Nilis 39', 44', 63'; Zenden 90'	Report	van Burik (yellow card) (yellow-red card) 54'; Vanenburg 87'	Stadium: Philips Stadion; Attendance: 29,000; Referee: Herman van Dijk

25 May 1997 33	PSV Eindhoven	3–1	Willem II	Eindhoven
CEST (UTC+2)	Nilis 22'; Jonk 36'; Gilles De Bilde 38'; Jensen (yellow card)	Report	Kolkka 24'; Mampaey (yellow card); Schenning (yellow card); Feskens (yellow card); Loeffen (yellow card)	Stadium: Philips Stadion; Attendance: 29,800; Referee: Dick Jol

1 June 1997 34	Roda JC	3–1	PSV Eindhoven	Eindhoven
CEST (UTC+2)	Sibon 22', 50' van Houdt 44'	Report	Degryse 80'	Stadium: Gemeentelijk Sportpark Kaalheide; Attendance: 7,400; Referee: Harry van Beek

=== KNVB Cup ===
27 November 1996 First round	VVV-Venlo	1–2	PSV Eindhoven	Venlo
CET (UTC+1)	Hofman 81' de Wolf (yellow card) van der Meer (yellow card); Witzenhausen (yellow card)	Report	Nilis 40'; Zenden 50'; Vink (yellow card)	Stadium: De Koel; Attendance: 10,449; Referee: Herman van Dijk

12 February 1997 Round of 16	PSV Eindhoven	2–3 (a.e.t.)	AZ Alkmaar	Eindhoven
CET (UTC+1)	Nilis 10', 54' (pen.)	Report	Buskermolen 7', 61'; Verhagen 103'; Hesp (yellow card); Opdam (yellow card)	Stadium: Philips Stadion; Attendance: 12,000; Referee: Jef van Vliet

=== UEFA Cup Winners' Cup ===
==== First round ====
12 September 1996 First leg	Dinamo Batumi (Georgia (country))	1–1	(Netherlands) PSV Eindhoven	Batumi
18:00 CEST (UTC+2)	Mujiri 21'	Report	Vink (yellow card) 29'; Nilis 40'	Stadium: Central Stadium; Attendance: 14,000; Referee: Kurt Zuppinger (Switzerland)

26 September 1996 Second leg	PSV Eindhoven (Netherlands)	3–0 (4–1 agg.)	(Georgia (country)) Dinamo Batumi	Eindhoven
20:30 CEST (UTC+2)	Nilis 15' (pen.); Eijkelkamp 56'; Vampeta (yellow card) 64'; Marcelo Ramos 85'	Report	Mujiri (yellow card) 58'; Makharadze (yellow card) 79'	Stadium: Philips Stadion; Attendance: 14,200; Referee: Stuart Dougal (Scotland)

==== Second round ====
17 October 1996 First leg	Brann (Norway)	2–1	(Netherlands) PSV Eindhoven	Bergen
20:00 CEST (UTC+2)	Mjelde 28', 33'; Eftevaag (yellow card) 30'; Ludvigsen (yellow card) 63'	Report	van der Doelen (yellow card) 16'; Valckx (yellow card) 86'; Cocu 90'	Stadium: Brann Stadion; Attendance: 7,842; Referee: Alain Hamer (Luxembourg)

31 October 1996 Second leg	PSV Eindhoven (Netherlands)	2–2 (3–4 agg.)	(Norway) Brann	Eindhoven
20:30 CET (UTC+1)	Vink (yellow card) 42'; Eijkelkamp 75'; Zenden 83'	Report	Johansson (yellow card) 11'; Hasund (yellow card) 28' (goal) 35'; Flo 58'	Stadium: Philips Stadion; Attendance: 19,000; Referee: Philippe Leduc (France)

=== Appearances and goals ===
As of 11 November 2026

No.	Pos	Nat	Player	Total		Eredivisie		KNVB Cup		UEFA Cup Winners' Cup		Johan Cruyff Shield	
No.	Pos	Nat	Player	Apps	Goals	Apps	Goals	Apps	Goals	Apps	Goals	Apps	Goals
	GK	(Netherlands) NED	Waterreus	38	0	31+0	0+0	2	0	4+0	0	1+0	0
	GK	(Netherlands) NED	van Ede	5	0	3+2	0	0+0	0	0+0	0	0+0	0
	GK	(Netherlands) NED	Need	1	0	0+1	0	0+0	0	0+0	0	0+0	0
	DF	(Netherlands) NED	van der Weerden	27	3	9+15	3	1+0	0	1+1	0	0+0	0
	DF	(Denmark) DEN	Jensen	3	0	2+1	0	0+0	0	0+0	0	0+0	0
	DF	(Netherlands) NED	Bouma	1	0	0+1	0	0+0	0	0+0	0	0+0	0
	DF	(Netherlands) NED	Stam	40	6	33+0	6	2+0	0	4+0	0	1+0	0
	DF	(Netherlands) NED	Valckx	36	1	29+0	1	2+0	0	4+0	0	0+1	0
	DF	(Netherlands) NED	Faber	11	0	4+5	0	0+1	0	0+0	0	1+0	0
	DF	(Netherlands) NED	Numan	38	2	31+0	2	2+0	0	4+0	0	1+0	0
	DF	(Socialist Federal Republic of Yugoslavia) YUG	Petrović	31	5	21+4	5	1+1	0	1+2	0	0+1	0
	MF	(Netherlands) NED	Cocu	41	9	34+0	8	2+0	0	4+0	1	1+0	0
	MF	(Netherlands) NED	Jonk	37	9	32+0	9	1+0	0	3+0	0	1+0	0
	MF	(Brazil) BRA	Vampeta	37	2	28+3	2	2+0	0	3+0	0	1+0	0
	MF	(Netherlands) NED	Zenden	40	10	23+11	8	0+2	1	1+3	1	0+0	0
	MF	(Netherlands) NED	Vink	25	2	18+1	2	2+0	0	3+0	0	1+0	0
	MF	(Netherlands) NED	van der Doelen	12	0	1+9	0	0+1	0	1+0	0	0+0	0
	MF	(Romania) ROU	Stîngă	8	0	4+3	0	1+0	0	0+0	0	0+0	0
	MF	(Denmark) DEN	Nielsen	1	0	0+1	0	0+0	0	0+0	0	0+0	0
	MF	(Denmark) DEN	Rommedahl	2	0	0+2	0	0+0	0	0+0	0	0+0	0
	FW	(Brazil) BRA	Cláudio	3	0	0+3	0	0+0	0	0+0	0	0+0	0
	FW	(Belgium) BEL	Nilis	33	26	25+1	21	2+0	3	4+0	2	1+0	0
	FW	(Brazil) BRA	Marcelo Ramos	28	12	15+7	11	2+0	0	0+3	1	0+1	0
	FW	(Belgium) BEL	Degryse	27	5	14+9	3	0+0	0	3+0	0	1+0	2
	FW	(Netherlands) NED	Eijkelkamp	19	6	9+5	3	0+0	0	4+0	2	1+0	1
	FW	(Belgium) BEL	De Bilde	8	7	8+0	7	0+0	0	0+0	0	0+0	0
	FW	(Netherlands) NED	Pahlplatz	1	1	0+1	1	0+0	0	0+0	0	0+0	0
