= 1998–99 PSV Eindhoven season =

PSV Eindhoven
1998–99 season
- Manager: Bobby Robson
- Stadium: Philips Stadion
- Eredivisie: 3rd
- KNVB Cup: Semi-final
- Champions League: Group stage
- Johan Cruyff Shield: Winners
- Top goalscorer: League: Ruud van Nistelrooy (31); All: Ruud van Nistelrooy (36)
Home colours	Away colours

During the 1998–99 Dutch football season, PSV Eindhoven competed in the Eredivisie.

== Season summary ==
PSV dropped one place in the final league table to third, only qualifying for the Champions League on the final day of the season. Manager Bobby Robson's contract expired at the end of the season, and former PSV right-back Eric Gerets was signed from Belgian champions Club Brugge as his replacement.

== Players ==
=== First-team squad ===
Squad at end of season

Note: Flags indicate national team as defined under FIFA eligibility rules; some limited exceptions apply. Players may hold more than one non-FIFA nationality.

No.	Pos.	Nation	Player
1	GK	NED	Patrick Lodewijks
2	DF	NED	André Ooijer
3	DF	RUS	Yuriy Nikiforov (Note: Nikiforov was born in Odesa, Ukrainian SSR, and made his international debut for Ukraine in 1992, but also qualified to represent Russia internationally and made his international debut for Russia in 1993.)
4	DF	NED	Stan Valckx
5	DF	BEL	Davy Oyen
6	MF	NED	Robert Fuchs
7	DF	POR	Abel Xavier (Note: Xavier was born in Nampula, Mozambique, but also qualified to represent Portugal internationally and represented Portugal at U-16, U-17, U-18, U-20 and U-21 level before making his international debut for Portugal in March 1993.)
8	FW	NED	Ruud van Nistelrooy
9	FW	BEL	Gilles De Bilde
10	FW	BEL	Luc Nilis (captain)
11	MF	FIN	Joonas Kolkka
12	MF	NED	Arnold Bruggink
13	MF	GEO	Giorgi Gakhokidze
14	DF	NED	Ernest Faber
15	DF	NED	Jürgen Dirkx
16	DF	NED	Chris van der Weerden

No.	Pos.	Nation	Player
17	DF	BRA	Marcos
18	MF	SVK	Igor Demo
19	MF	POL	Tomasz Iwan
20	MF	RUS	Dmitri Khokhlov
21	DF	NED	Theo Lucius
22	FW	BRA	Claudio
23	GK	NED	Ronald Waterreus
24	MF	ROU	Ovidiu Stîngă
25	MF	NED	Marciano Vink (Note: Vink was born in Paramaribo, Suriname, but also qualified to represent the Netherlands internationally and made his international debut for the Netherlands in 1991.)
28	DF	BRA	Jorginho Paulista
29	MF	DEN	Dennis Rommedahl
30	DF	LTU	Andrius Skerla
31	GK	NED	Wilbert Need
32	MF	NED	Björn van der Doelen
33	DF	NED	Rob Wielaert

=== Left club during season ===
Note: Flags indicate national team as defined under FIFA eligibility rules; some limited exceptions apply. Players may hold more than one non-FIFA nationality.

No. / Pos. / Nation / Player; — / DF / NED / Wilfred Bouma (on loan to Fortuna Sittard)	No. / Pos. / Nation / Player

=== Jong PSV ===
Note: Flags indicate national team as defined under FIFA eligibility rules; some limited exceptions apply. Players may hold more than one non-FIFA nationality.

No.	Pos.	Nation	Player
—	DF	DEN	Kasper Bøgelund
—	MF	NED	Johan Pater

No.	Pos.	Nation	Player
—	FW	NED	Björn Becker

== Transfers ==
=== In ===
Player	Age	From	Fee
Ruud van Nistelrooy (Netherlands)	22	Heerenveen (Netherlands)	€7,000,000
Yuriy Nikiforov (Russia)	27	Sporting Gijón (Spain)	€2,700,000
Davy Oyen (Belgium)	22	KRC Genk (Belgium)	€2,500,000
Abel Xavier (Portugal)	25	Real Oviedo (Spain)	€1,980,000
Patrick Lodewijks (Netherlands)	31	FC Groningen (Netherlands)	€450,000
Joonas Kolkka (Finland)	23	Willem II (Netherlands)	Free
Marcos (Brazil)	23	Rio Ave FC (Portugal)	Unknown
Jürgen Dirkx (Netherlands)	23	Fortuna Sittard (Netherlands)	Unknown
Giorgi Gakhokidze (Georgia (country))	22	Spartak Vladikavkaz (Russia)	Unknown
Theo Lucius (Netherlands)	21	FC Den Bosch (Netherlands)	Unknown
Robert Fuchs (Netherlands)	23	De Graafschap (Netherlands)	Unknown
Manoel (Brazil)	20	SC Internacional (Brazil)	Unknown

=== Loans in ===
Player	Age	From	Fee
Anders Nielsen (Denmark)	25	RKC Waalwijk (Netherlands)	End of loan
Dennis Rommedahl (Denmark)	19	RKC Waalwijk (Netherlands)	End of loan
Wilfred Bouma (Netherlands)	20	MVV Maastricht (Netherlands)	End of loan
Björn van der Doelen (Netherlands)	21	Standard Liège (Belgium)	End of loan
Eiður Guðjohnsen (Iceland)	19	KR Reykjavík (Iceland)	End of loan

=== Out ===
Player	Age	To	Fee
Phillip Cocu (Netherlands)	27	FC Barcelona (Spain)	Free
Wim Jonk (Netherlands)	31	Sheffield Wednesday (England)	€2,800,000
Jaap Stam (Netherlands)	25	Manchester United (England)	€17,000,000
Arthur Numan (Netherlands)	28	Rangers F.C. (Scotland)	€7,700,000
Boudewijn Zenden (Netherlands)	21	FC Barcelona (Spain)	€12,000,000
Peter Møller (Denmark)	26	Real Oviedo (Spain)	€2,700,000
Niclas Jensen (Denmark)	23	F.C. Copenhagen (Denmark)	Free
Eiður Guðjohnsen (Iceland)	19	Bolton Wanderers (England)	Free
Marc Degryse (Belgium)	32	KAA Gent (Belgium)	Unknown
Anders Nielsen (Denmark)	25	Sparta Rotterdam (Netherlands)	Unknown
Jan Willem van Ede (Netherlands)	35	HFC Haarlem (Netherlands)	Unknown

=== Loans out ===
Player	Age	To	Fee
Wilfred Bouma (Netherlands)	20	Fortuna Sittard (Netherlands)	Loan
Jorginho Paulista (Brazil)	18	Udinese (Italy)	January, loan
Sergei Temryukov (Russia)	20	Dynamo Moscow (Russia)	January, loan
Cláudio (Brazil)	19	EC Vitória (Brazil)	Loan
