= 1996–97 in Dutch football =

The 1996/1997 season in Dutch football was the 41st professional season in the Eredivisie, with PSV Eindhoven winning the title and Roda JC claiming the Dutch National Cup.

== Johan Cruijff-schaal ==
August 18, 1996

| Ajax | 0–3 | PSV |
|---|---|---|
| | | Eijkelkamp 48'; Degryse 61', 78' |

Amsterdam ArenA, Amsterdam
Attendance: 31.000
Referee: Uilenberg

== Eredivisie ==
| Position | Team | Points | Played | Won | Drawn | Lost | For | Against | Difference |
|---|---|---|---|---|---|---|---|---|---|
| 1 | PSV Eindhoven | 77 | 34 | 24 | 5 | 5 | 90 | 26 | +64 |
| 2 | Feyenoord Rotterdam | 73 | 34 | 22 | 7 | 5 | 67 | 34 | +33 |
| 3 | FC Twente | 65 | 34 | 20 | 5 | 9 | 60 | 33 | +27 |
| 4 | Ajax Amsterdam | 61 | 34 | 17 | 10 | 7 | 55 | 31 | +24 |
| 5 | Vitesse Arnhem | 55 | 34 | 15 | 10 | 9 | 53 | 41 | +12 |
| 6 | Roda JC | 55 | 34 | 16 | 7 | 11 | 56 | 47 | +9 |
| 7 | SC Heerenveen | 50 | 34 | 13 | 11 | 10 | 58 | 47 | +11 |
| 8 | De Graafschap | 45 | 34 | 13 | 6 | 15 | 52 | 55 | -3 |
| 9 | NAC Breda | 40 | 34 | 10 | 10 | 14 | 41 | 54 | -13 |
| 10 | FC Groningen | 39 | 34 | 9 | 12 | 13 | 43 | 56 | -13 |
| 11 | Fortuna Sittard | 39 | 34 | 9 | 12 | 13 | 36 | 52 | -16 |
| 12 | FC Utrecht | 38 | 34 | 8 | 14 | 12 | 42 | 52 | -10 |
| 13 | Sparta Rotterdam | 38 | 34 | 11 | 5 | 18 | 40 | 56 | -16 |
| 14 | FC Volendam | 38 | 34 | 9 | 11 | 14 | 36 | 55 | -19 |
| 15 | Willem II Tilburg | 35 | 34 | 9 | 11 | 14 | 34 | 51 | -17 |
| 16 | RKC Waalwijk | 34 | 34 | 9 | 7 | 18 | 39 | 61 | -22 |
| 17 | NEC Nijmegen | 32 | 34 | 7 | 11 | 16 | 35 | 61 | -26 |
| 18 | AZ Alkmaar | 25 | 34 | 6 | 7 | 21 | 27 | 52 | -25 |

- Champions League : PSV Eindhoven
- Champions League qualification : Feyenoord Rotterdam
- Cup Winners Cup: Roda JC
- UEFA Cup: FC Twente, Ajax Amsterdam and Vitesse Arnhem
- Promotion / relegation play-offs ("Nacompetitie"): RKC Waalwijk and NEC Nijmegen
- Relegated: AZ Alkmaar

=== Topscorers ===
| Position | Player | Nationality | Club | Goals |
|---|---|---|---|---|
| 1 | Luc Nilis | (Belgium) | PSV Eindhoven | 21 |
| 2 | John Bosman | (Netherlands) | FC Twente | 20 |
| 3 | Roy Makaay | (Netherlands) | Vitesse Arnhem | 19 |
| 4 | Jon Dahl Tomasson | (Denmark) | SC Heerenveen | 18 |
| 5 | Pablo Sánchez | (Argentina) | Feyenoord Rotterdam | 16 |

=== Awards ===
==== Dutch Footballer of the Year ====
- 1996 — Ronald de Boer (Ajax Amsterdam)
- 1997 — Jaap Stam (PSV Eindhoven)

==== Dutch Golden Shoe Winner ====
- 1996 — Danny Blind (Ajax Amsterdam)
- 1997 — Jaap Stam (PSV Eindhoven)

=== PSV Winning Squad 1996-'97 ===
Goal

- (Netherlands) Jan-Willem van Ede
- (Netherlands) Wilburt Need
- (Netherlands) Ronald Waterreus

Defence

- (Netherlands) Ernest Faber
- (Denmark) Niclas Jensen
- (Netherlands) Arthur Numan
- (Netherlands) Jaap Stam
- (Netherlands) Stan Valckx
- (Brazil) Vampeta
- (Netherlands) Chris van der Weerden

Midfield

- (Netherlands) Wilfred Bouma
- (Netherlands) Phillip Cocu
- (Belgium) Marc Degryse
- (Netherlands) Björn van der Doelen
- (Netherlands) Wim Jonk
- (Denmark) Anders Nielsen
- (Netherlands) Boudewijn Pahlplatz
- (Socialist Federal Republic of Yugoslavia) Zeljko Petrovic
- (Denmark) Dennis Rommedahl
- (Romania) Ovidiu Stinga
- (Netherlands) Marciano Vink

Attack

- (Belgium) Gilles De Bilde
- (Brazil) Claudio
- (Netherlands) René Eijkelkamp
- (Brazil) Marcelo
- (Belgium) Luc Nilis
- (Netherlands) Boudewijn Zenden

Management

- (Netherlands) Dick Advocaat (Coach)
- (Netherlands) Rob Baan (Assistant)

== Eerste Divisie ==
| Position | Team | Points | Played | Won | Drawn | Lost | For | Against | Difference |
|---|---|---|---|---|---|---|---|---|---|
| 1 | MVV Maastricht | 70 | 34 | 20 | 10 | 4 | 62 | 30 | +32 |
| 2 | Cambuur Leeuwarden | 67 | 34 | 20 | 7 | 7 | 65 | 33 | +32 |
| 3 | FC Emmen | 63 | 34 | 18 | 9 | 7 | 58 | 36 | +22 |
| 4 | VVV-Venlo | 57 | 34 | 16 | 9 | 9 | 55 | 40 | +15 |
| 5 | FC Zwolle | 55 | 34 | 15 | 10 | 9 | 52 | 40 | +12 |
| 6 | Go Ahead Eagles | 55 | 34 | 16 | 7 | 11 | 58 | 48 | +10 |
| 7 | FC Den Bosch | 54 | 34 | 16 | 6 | 12 | 55 | 43 | +12 |
| 8 | ADO Den Haag | 52 | 34 | 14 | 10 | 10 | 48 | 48 | 0 |
| 9 | FC Eindhoven | 50 | 34 | 14 | 8 | 12 | 53 | 53 | 0 |
| 10 | BV Veendam | 49 | 34 | 13 | 10 | 11 | 44 | 35 | +9 |
| 11 | TOP Oss | 47 | 34 | 13 | 8 | 13 | 46 | 50 | -4 |
| 12 | Dordrecht '90 | 46 | 34 | 13 | 7 | 14 | 45 | 49 | -4 |
| 13 | SC Heracles | 37 | 34 | 9 | 10 | 15 | 51 | 50 | +1 |
| 14 | Helmond Sport | 36 | 34 | 10 | 6 | 18 | 46 | 64 | -18 |
| 15 | RBC Roosendaal | 35 | 34 | 10 | 5 | 19 | 41 | 63 | -22 |
| 16 | SC Telstar | 28 | 34 | 7 | 7 | 20 | 34 | 68 | -34 |
| 17 | Excelsior Rotterdam | 24 | 34 | 6 | 6 | 22 | 37 | 67 | -30 |
| 18 | HFC Haarlem | 22 | 34 | 5 | 7 | 22 | 34 | 67 | -33 |

- Promoted : MVV Maastricht
- Promotion / relegation play-offs ("Nacompetitie"): Cambuur, Emmen, VVV, Zwolle, Eindhoven, Go Ahead Eagles and ADO Den Haag

== Promotion and relegation ==
=== Group A ===
| Position | Team | Points | Played | Won | Drawn | Lost | For | Against | Difference |
|---|---|---|---|---|---|---|---|---|---|
| 1 | RKC Waalwijk | 15 | 6 | 5 | 0 | 1 | 19 | 6 | +13 |
| 2 | FC Zwolle | 10 | 6 | 3 | 1 | 2 | 6 | 9 | -3 |
| 3 | FC Emmen | 7 | 6 | 2 | 1 | 3 | 8 | 10 | -2 |
| 4 | ADO Den Haag | 2 | 6 | 0 | 2 | 4 | 3 | 11 | -8 |

=== Group B ===
| Position | Team | Points | Played | Won | Drawn | Lost | For | Against | Difference |
|---|---|---|---|---|---|---|---|---|---|
| 1 | NEC Nijmegen | 15 | 6 | 5 | 0 | 1 | 19 | 5 | +14 |
| 2 | Go Ahead Eagles | 15 | 6 | 5 | 0 | 1 | 17 | 8 | +9 |
| 3 | Cambuur Leeuwarden | 6 | 6 | 2 | 0 | 4 | 8 | 15 | -7 |
| 4 | VVV-Venlo | 0 | 6 | 0 | 0 | 6 | 6 | 22 | -16 |

- Stayed : RKC Waalwijk and NEC Nijmegen

== KNVB Cup ==
Quarter-finals
March 11
FC Zwolle | 0
Roda JC | 5
March 12
AZ Alkmaar | 0
Willem II Tilburg | 2
March 12
SC Heerenveen | 2
Feyenoord Rotterdam | 1
March 12
Helmond Sport | 2
Vitesse Arnhem | 1

Semi-finals
April 16
Roda JC | 1
Willem II Tilburg | 0
April 17
SC Heerenveen | 5
Helmond Sport | 0

Final
May 8 - Rotterdam
Roda JC | 4
SC Heerenveen | 2

=== Final ===
May 8, 1997

| Roda JC | 4–2 | SC Heerenveen |
|---|---|---|
| Sibon 4'; Senden 16'; Van der Luer 48'; Schops 56' | | Korneev 12'; Talan 83' |

De Kuip, Rotterdam
Attendance: 48.000
Referee: Reygwart
