= Jeffrey Talan =

Dutch footballer and coach

Personal information
- Full name: Jeffrey Dennis Talan
- Date of birth: 29 September 1971 (age 55)
- Place of birth: Katwijk, Netherlands
- Height: 1.75 m (5 ft 9 in)
- Position: Right winger

Team information
- Current team: Bali United (assistant)

Youth career
- –1989: VV Katwijk
- 1989–1990: ADO Den Haag

Senior career*
Years	Team	Apps	(Gls)
1990–1995	ADO Den Haag	90	(18)
1995–2002	Heerenveen	167	(41)

International career
1998–2000	Netherlands	8	(1)

Managerial career
- 2010–2016: Heerenveen (youth)
- 2019–2021: Heerenveen (assistant)
- 2022: Heerenveen (assistant)
- 2022–2025: Almere City (assistant)
- 2023–: Netherlands U21 (assistant)
- 2025–: Bali United (assistant)
- * Club domestic league appearances and goals

Jeffrey Dennis Talan (born 29 September 1971) is a Dutch professional football coach and former player who is the assistant coach of Bali United. He gained 8 caps for the Netherlands national football team, in which he scored once.

== Club career ==
=== Den Haag ===
Talan began playing youth football for VV Katwijk, before moving to FC Den Haag. There, he made his debut in the Eredivisie in the 1990–91 season in the 2–0 away win over FC Volendam as a late substitute for Emiel van Eijkeren. He scored his first professional goal on 22 September 1991, opening the score in a 2–2 draw against FC Groningen. After two seasons at the highest level in which Talan made 17 appearances, the club which at that point had changed its name to ADO Den Haag suffered relegation to the Eerste Divisie after losing to Go Ahead Eagles in the relegation play-offs.

=== Heerenveen ===
After impressing at the second level with ADO for three seasons, Talan signed with Eredivisie club SC Heerenveen in the summer of 1995 after a deal with Swiss club Grasshoppers fell through. He made his debut on 15 July 1995 in the UEFA Intertoto Cup match against Hungarian club Békéscsaba, coming on as a substitute in the 74th minute for Johan Hansma. He scored his first goal for the club on 4 October in a 3–1 away win over NEC. In Heerenveen, Talan soon became a starter and as a right winger he scored regularly. On 6 April 1996, he scored his first hat-trick in a 4–2 win over FC Utrecht.

Talan made his first appearance in the UEFA Champions League on 12 September 2000, after Heerenveen had qualified for the tournament by finishing second in the Eredivisie in the 1999–2000 season. In a 3–1 loss in the first group stage game to Lyon, Talan also scored his first and only goal in the competition; a chip over goalkeeper Grégory Coupet after a through-ball by Daniel Jensen. In played in all six group stage games, as Heerenveen finished bottom.

He retired from professional football in December 2002 due to a lingering injury to his right knee. He managed a total of 201 appearances for Heerenveen, scoring 47 goals. After retiring, he played shortly for Derde Klasse club Olyphia from Noordwolde under future Heerenveen manager Johnny Jansen.

== International career ==
On 10 October 1998, Talan made his debut for the Netherlands national team in the friendly against Peru after receiving his first call-up by new coach Frank Rijkaard. Thereby, he became the third ever Heerenveen player to appear for the national team after Abe Lenstra and Germ Hofma. In the run-up to the UEFA Euro 2000 hosted by the Netherlands and Belgium, he made five appearances for the national team. During the Euros, however, Talan was sidelined with a serious knee injury. After the tournament, new coach Louis van Gaal called up Talan for three 2002 FIFA World Cup qualifiers in which he scored once.

== Style of play ==
Talan has been described as "real, almost orthodox" right winger, who was able to beat defenders one-on-one. Growing up, he modelled his play after Gerald Vanenburg.

== Coaching career ==
Talan became youth coach with SC Heerenveen in 2010 and in 2016 he became head of the club's youth academy. From the 2019–20 season, he became assistant coach of the first team. He left the club in June 2021, after his contract expired.

On 27 June 2022, Almere City appointed Talan as assistant coach to Alex Pastoor, replacing Tim Bakens.

== Personal life ==
Born in the Netherlands, Talan is of Indonesian descent, his father was from Banda Neira. His older brother Ricky Talan won the Eredivisie title with AZ '67 in 1981. He died in September 2015 at age 54 from a brain tumor.

== Career statistics ==
=== Club ===
Appearances and goals by club, season and competition
Club	Season	League			National Cup		Continental		Total	
Club	Season	Division	Apps	Goals	Apps	Goals	Apps	Goals	Apps	Goals
Den Haag	1990–91	Eredivisie	5	0	0	0	—		5	0
Den Haag	1991–92	Eredivisie	13	1	0	0	—		13	1
Den Haag	1992–93	Eerste Divisie	30	5	0	0	—		30	5
Den Haag	1993–94	Eerste Divisie	23	3	0	0	—		23	3
Den Haag	1994–95	Eerste Divisie	19	6	0	0	—		19	6
Den Haag	Total		90	15	0	0	—		90	15
Heerenveen	1995–96	Eredivisie	26	9	0	0	4 (Note: Appearances in UEFA Intertoto Cup)	0	30	9
Heerenveen	1996–97	Eredivisie	23	4	1	1	4	1	28	6
Heerenveen	1997–98	Eredivisie	10	2	2	0	4	2	16	4
Heerenveen	1998–99	Eredivisie	31	8	1	0	3 (Note: Appearances in UEFA Cup Winners' Cup)	1	35	9
Heerenveen	1999–2000	Eredivisie	24	9	0	0	4	0	28	9
Heerenveen	2000–01	Eredivisie	32	7	1	0	6 (Note: Appearances in UEFA Champions League)	1	39	8
Heerenveen	2001–02	Eredivisie	19	2	0	0	4	1	23	3
Heerenveen	2002–03	Eredivisie	2	0	0	0	0	0	2	0
Heerenveen	Total		167	41	5	0	29	6	201	47
Career total			257	56	5	0	29	6	291	62

=== International ===
Appearances and goals by national team and year
National team	Year	Apps	Goals
Netherlands	1998	3	0
Netherlands	2000	5	1
Total		8	1

Scores and results list Talan's goal tally first, score column indicates score after each Netherlands goal.

List of international goals scored by Jeffrey Talan
No.	Date	Venue	Opponent	Score	Result	Competition	Ref.
1	2 September 2000	Amsterdam Arena, Amsterdam, Netherlands	Republic of Ireland	1–2	2–2	2002 FIFA World Cup qualification	
