= Hoekman =

Hoekman is a surname. Notable people with the surname include:

- Danny Hoekman (born 1964), Dutch footballer and manager
- Laurens Hoekman (born 1998), Dutch curler
- Nina Hoekman (1964–2014), Ukrainian-Dutch draughts player and coach
- Rafael Hoekman (born 1975), American-Canadian cellist
