= Niclas Jensen =

Danish footballer (born 1974)

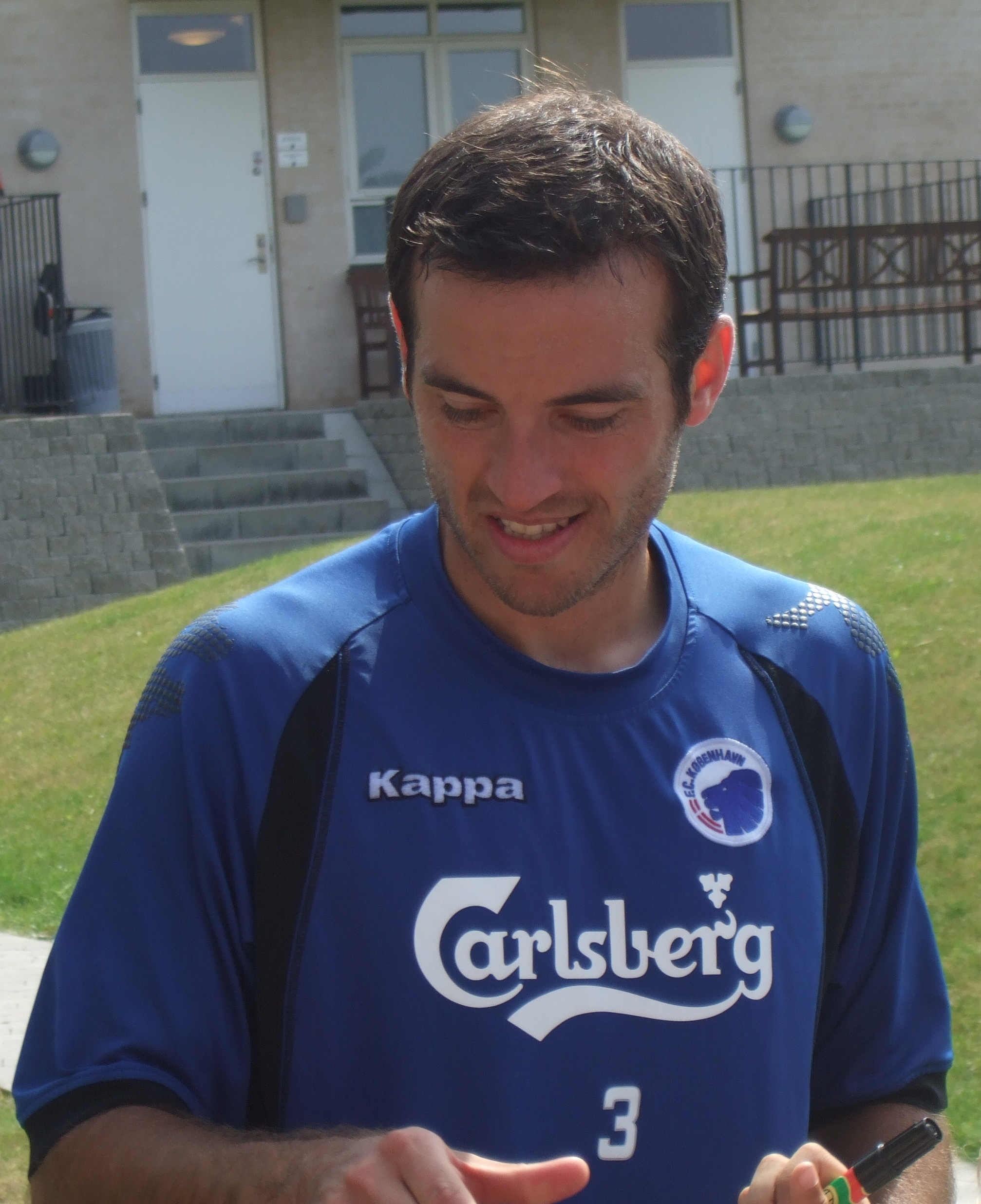
- Jensen with F.C. Copenhagen in 2008

Personal information
- Full name: Niclas Christian Monberg Jensen
- Date of birth: 17 August 1974 (age 52)
- Place of birth: Copenhagen, Denmark
- Height: 1.79 m (5 ft 10 in)
- Position: Left-back

Youth career
- B.93

Senior career*
Years	Team	Apps	(Gls)
1993–1996	Lyngby FC	92	(7)
1996–1998	PSV Eindhoven	5	(0)
1998–2002	F.C. Copenhagen	122	(7)
2002–2003	Manchester City	51	(2)
2003–2005	Borussia Dortmund	43	(2)
2005–2007	Fulham	16	(0)
2007–2009	F.C. Copenhagen	37	(0)
Total		366	(18)

International career
1990–1991	Denmark U17	15	(2)
1992–1993	Denmark U19	11	(0)
1994–1996	Denmark U21	18	(2)
1998–2008	Denmark	62	(0)
- * Club domestic league appearances and goals

Niclas Christian Monberg Jensen (born 17 August 1974) is a Danish former professional football player and current football agent. He played as a left-back, and most notably won three Danish Superliga championships with F.C. Copenhagen. He played abroad for Dutch club PSV Eindhoven, English clubs Manchester City and Fulham, as well as German club Borussia Dortmund. Jensen played 62 games for the Denmark national team between 1998 and 2008, representing Denmark at the 2002 FIFA World Cup and 2004 European Championship. He was named 1995 Danish Under-21 Player of the Year.

He is the older brother of Denmark national team player Daniel Jensen.

== Club career ==
Born in Copenhagen, Denmark, Jensen started playing football for Danish club Boldklubben 1893 (B.93). He moved on to Lyngby Boldklub in the Danish Superliga championship in 1992. He made his Lyngby debut in April 1993. Jensen played a total of 92 games and scored five goals for Lyngby in the Superliga between April 1993 and September 1996.

In the fall of 1996, Jensen was one of several Lyngby players sold by Lyngby CEO Flemming Østergaard. Jensen was one of three Lyngby players sold to Dutch team PSV Eindhoven, alongside Anders Nielsen and Dennis Rommedahl. In his first season at PSV, Jensen played three games as the club won the 1996–97 Eredivisie championship. Jensen played only five games in one and a half seasons at PSV, as he underwent two groin operations, and was used as back-up to Dutch international Arthur Numan.

In March 1998, Jensen returned to Denmark to play for F.C. Copenhagen (FCK) on a 4 1/2-year contract, brought in by FCK's new CEO Flemming Østergaard. Jensen went on to play almost five years for F.C. Copenhagen, winning the 2000–01 Danish Superliga championship with the club. With former Lyngby teammate Thomas Rytter as right wingback, Jensen formed a wingback duo that was known as the best in the Superliga. Jensen played a total of 122 games and scored eight goals for FCK in the Superliga between April 1998 and December 2001. In January 2002, he was sold to Manchester City in the English 1st Division, in a transfer deal worth £ 550,000.

Jensen played the remaining 18 games of the season, as Manchester City won promotion to the top-flight FA Premier League in the summer 2002. Returning from the 2002 FIFA World Cup, he played 33 of Manchester City's 38 games in the 2002–03 Premiership season, as the club finished ninth in the Premier League. A high point came at home against Leeds United when Jensen scored a spectacular volley to win the game. Jensen played a total 51 league games, scoring two goals, for Manchester City.

Niclas Jensen was bought by German team Borussia Dortmund in July 2003 for a fee in the region of £750,000. He started well for Dortmund, but Jensen was eventually relegated to the role of substitute for Brazilian wingback Dedê. In his two seasons in the club, Jensen played 43 games and scored two goals for Dortmund in the Bundesliga. After two years at Dortmund, he moved back to England in July 2005, to play for Fulham in the FA Premier League. At Fulham, he joined former Lyngby teammate Claus Jensen.

In the first half of the 2005–06 season, Niclas Jensen was a Fulham regular. When the club signed a loan deal with English international defender Wayne Bridge in January 2006, Jensen was dropped from the Fulham first team after the 14 January 2006 Premiership game against Newcastle United. He would have to wait until September 2006, before he played his next Fulham game, being substituted off in a Football League Cup game against Wycombe Wanderers. With only one competitive game for Fulham in almost a year, Jensen looked to leave Fulham in January 2007. It was rumoured the solution would be a move "home" to F.C. Copenhagen, and his return to FCK was published in January 2007. By waiting to move back to Denmark until January 2007, Jensen was eligible for preferential taxation rules.

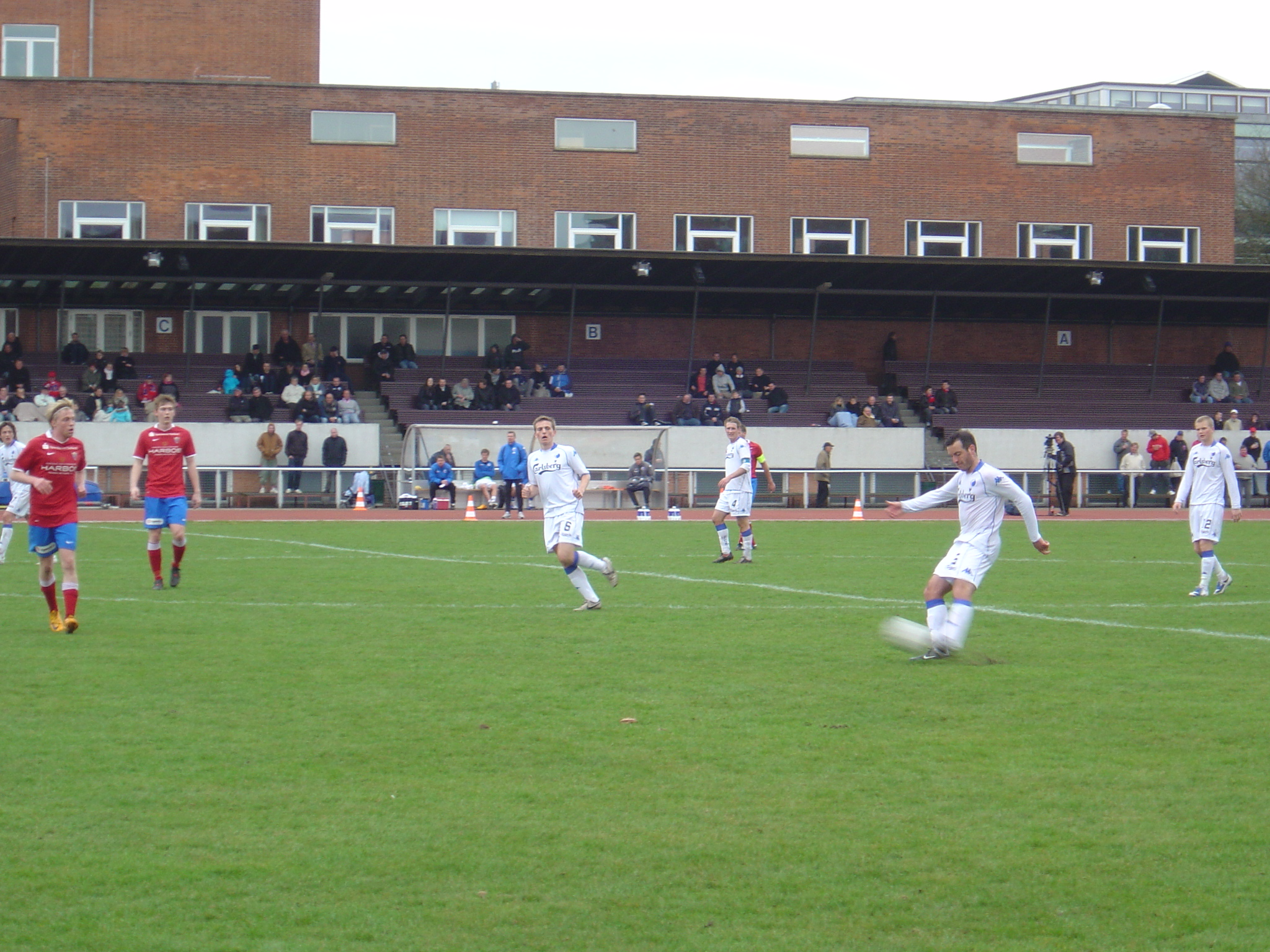
Jensen playing for the FCK reserves against FC Vestsjælland in April 2009.

In his first half season back at FCK, Jensen played 12 of 14 games, as FCK won the 2006–07 Superliga championship. In the following seasons, Jensen saw his playing time dwindling, as he became back-up for Swedish international Oscar Wendt. Jensen played seven of 33 games as FCK won the 2008–09 Superliga championship. He did not play any Superliga games in the fall of 2009, and in October 2009, Jensen decided to end his playing career, in order to pursue a career as a football agent. Niclas Jensen played a total of 213 games and scored 10 goals for FCK in all competitions combined.

== International career ==
While at B.93, Jensen made his debut for the Denmark under-17 national teams in July 1990, and he played three matches at the 1991 UEFA European Under-16 Football Championship. While playing for Lyngby, Jensen debuted for the Denmark under-21 national team in July 1994, and he won the 1995 Danish Under-21 Player of the Year award.

While at F.C. Copenhagen, he was called up for the senior Denmark national team under national team coach Bo Johansson. Jensen debuted in a friendly match against the Czech Republic in August 1998. Following his debut, Jensen would have to wait more than two years to play his second national team game. Under new national team coach Morten Olsen, Jensen was recalled for a friendly match against Germany in November 2000.

He was selected for the Denmark national team at the 2002 FIFA World Cup, and in the progress of the tournament, he displaced Jan Heintze as Denmark's starting left wingback. In his time at Dortmund, Jensen was selected to represent Denmark at the 2004 European Championship. He played Denmark's first three matches at the tournament, before being replaced by Kasper Bøgelund for Denmark's final game before elimination.

In January 2007, having only played few games for his club team Fulham, Jensen received an ultimatum from national manager Morten Olsen to either find himself a new club or be dropped from the Denmark national team. Jensen moved to F.C. Copenhagen, and was a part of the Denmark national team until he played his last national team game in March 2008. He played a total 62 games for the Denmark national team.

== Career statistics ==
=== International ===
Appearances and goals by national team and year
National team	Year	Apps	Goals
Denmark	1998	1	0
Denmark	1999	–	
Denmark	2000	1	0
Denmark	2001	2	0
Denmark	2002	11	0
Denmark	2003	10	0
Denmark	2004	13	0
Denmark	2005	10	0
Denmark	2006	6	0
Denmark	2007	7	0
Denmark	2008	1	0
Total		62	0

== Honours ==
PSV Eindhoven

- Eredivisie: 1996–97

FC Copenhagen

- Danish Superliga: 2001–02, 2006–07, 2008–09
- Danish Cup: 2008–09

Manchester City

- Football League First Division: 2001–02

Individual

- Danish Under-21 Player of the Year: 1995
