= TOS-Actief =

Dutch football club

- Full name: Ter Overwinning Streven-Actief
- Founded: 18 October 1912; 112 years ago
- Ground: Sportpark Middenmeer
- League: Vierde Klasse (2023–24)
- Website: http://www.tos-actief.nl/
Home colours	Away colours

TOS-Actief is a Dutch football club based in Amsterdam, North Holland. TOS was founded in 1912 and merged with Actief (which was founded in 1920) in 1939, it now has over 500 members. Marciano Vink was a member of TOS-Actief.

== History ==
=== TOS ===
TOS (Ter Overwinning Streven) was established on 10 October 1912 in the basement of a store on Lange Leidsedwarsstraat by a group of individuals from various parts of Amsterdam. Despite securing a pitch, its location in the outskirts of Amsterdam posed accessibility challenges. TOS could only utilise this pitch on weekends, leading to the need for the members to manually redraw the lines every Friday using lime and bring the goalposts themselves. After a few years, TOS acquired a pitch at Middenweg 89 and became a part of the Amsterdamse Voetbalbond. Competing in the Tweede Divisie, TOS achieved championship victory in 1920. However, following this success, many players opted to transfer to larger clubs.

=== Actief ===
Actief (Active) was established on 6 September 1920, by a group of boys from the Von Zesenstraat. Mr. Dogger, since an honorary member of TOS-actief, took on various roles crucial for the club's operation, including chairman and paymaster. Initially, Actief secured a pitch on a sandy terrain in the Indische Buurt and became part of the Dutch Christian Football Association.

After one season, Actief expanded its presence by joining the Amsterdamse Volks Voetbalbond with two squads. By 1923, Actief further advanced by joining the Amsterdamse Voetbalbond with three professional squads. In a noteworthy achievement, Actief secured the championship in 1938. However, following this success, almost the entire squad, including players from lower squads, departed from Actief.

=== TOS-Actief ===
Due to declining membership in both TOS and Actief, a decision was made to merge in 1939, forming the club TOS-Actief (Ter Overwinning Streven Actief). During World War II, the Germans took control of the terrain. Following the war, the area was in disarray, and the remaining members of TOS-Actief played a crucial role in clearing debris from the pitch and constructing a wooden pavilion. In 1963, they upgraded to a stone pavilion.

In 1976, Amsterdam planned to construct a highway over the TOS-Actief area, prompting the club to relocate to Sportpark De Toekomst. TOS-Actief enjoyed two decades of football at this location. In 1996, with plans for the Amsterdam Arena and Jong Ajax's housing at Sportpark De Toekomst, TOS-Actief had to relocate once again. The club settled at Radioweg 63 on Sportpark Middenmeer, where it now boasts four pitches.
