= Kris Mampaey =

Belgian footballer (born 1970)

Personal information
- Date of birth: 2 November 1970 (age 56)
- Place of birth: Belgium
- Position: Goalkeeper

Senior career*
Years	Team	Apps	(Gls)
–1996	Lierse		
1996–2000	Willem II		
2000	Dunfermline Athletic	14	(0)
2000–2001	Antwerp	16	(0)
2001–2005	FC Den Bosch		
2003–2004	→ AZ Alkmaar (loan)		
2005	K.R.C. Mechelen		
- * Club domestic league appearances and goals

Kris Mampaey (born 2 November 1970) is a Belgian former professional footballer who played as a goalkeeper.

== Career ==
Mampaey started his senior career with Lierse S.K. In 2000, he signed for Dunfermline Athletic in the Scottish Championship, where he made fifteen appearances. After that, he played for Belgian club Royal Antwerp, Dutchs clubs Den Bosch and AZ Alkmaar, and Belgian club K.R.C. Mechelen before retiring in 2005.

== After football ==
Mampaey later worked as a maintenance engineer in his home country.

== Honours ==
Den Bosch

- Eerste Divisie: 2003–04
