= Sergei Temryukov =

Russian footballer

Personal information
- Full name: Sergei Aleksandrovich Temryukov
- Date of birth: 1 August 1978 (age 48)
- Place of birth: Yuzhno-Sakhalinsk, Russian SFSR
- Height: 1.77 m (5 ft 9 1/2 in)
- Position: Defender

Youth career
- DYuSSh Yuzhno-Sakhalinsk
- 1996–1997: PSV Eindhoven

Senior career*
Years	Team	Apps	(Gls)
1994–1995	Lokomotiv Yuzhno-Sakhalinsk		
1997–2000	PSV Eindhoven	2	(0)
1999	→ Dynamo Moscow (loan)	0	(0)
2000–2002	FC Eindhoven	99	(4)
2003	Lokomotiv Yuzhno-Sakhalinsk		
2004	Uralan Elista	17	(1)
2004–2005	Kozakken Boys		
2005–2007	KAMAZ Naberezhnye Chelny	48	(0)
2007	→ Dinamo Minsk (loan)	7	(0)

International career
1997–1998	Russia U-21	11	(0)
- * Club domestic league appearances and goals

Sergei Aleksandrovich Temryukov (Russian: Серге́й Александрович Темрюков; born 1 August 1978) is a Russian former professional footballer.

== Career ==
Born in Yuzhno-Sakhalinsk, Temuryukov trained with the Russia national under-17 football team in Moscow. Shortly after, he joined PSV Eindhoven's youth academy at age 16. Eventually, Temuryukov started training with PSV's senior side and made a handful of Eredivisie appearances, becoming the first Russian to play for the club. He didn't play enough matches to receive a medal, but PSV twice won the league during Temuryukov's time at the club.

Temuryukov had a spell on loan at FC Dynamo Moscow, but it was cut short after he suffered a serious knee injury. With his chances at PSV limited, he signed for Eerste Divisie side FC Eindhoven.
