= Johan Pater =

Dutch association football player

Personal information
- Date of birth: 1 January 1981 (age 45)
- Place of birth: Netherlands
- Position: Midfielder

Youth career
- 1987–1993: KSV Fortissimo
- 1993–1996: Vitesse
- 1996–1999: PSV

Senior career*
Years	Team	Apps	(Gls)
1999–2000	PSV	1	(0)
2000–2001	Eindhoven	8	(1)
2001–2002	AGOVV		
2002–2005	Stormvogels Telstar	67	(5)
2005–2006	Go Ahead Eagles	35	(2)
2006–2007	Volendam	24	(2)
2007	Stormvogels Telstar	22	(1)
2008–2009	AGOVV	32	(1)
- * Club domestic league appearances and goals

Johan Pater (born 1 January 1981) is a Dutch former professional footballer.
