= Davy Oyen =

Belgian footballer

Personal information
- Date of birth: 17 July 1975 (age 51)
- Place of birth: Zutendaal, Belgium
- Height: 1.83 m (6 ft 0 in)
- Position: Defender

Youth career
- 1982–1991: Zwaluw Wiemismeer
- 1991–1992: AS VV

Senior career*
Years	Team	Apps	(Gls)
1993–1994	Genk	13	(0)
1994–1995	Sint-Truiden	10	(0)
1995–1998	Genk	78	(11)
1998–1999	PSV Eindhoven	19	(0)
1999–2003	Anderlecht	12	(1)
2003–2004	Nottingham Forest	8	(0)
2004–2006	K.V.S.K. United Overpelt-Lommel	45	(6)
2006–2008	Roeselare	31	(4)
2008–2010	KVSK United	12	(2)

International career
1998–1999	Belgium	3	(0)
- * Club domestic league appearances and goals

Davy Oyen (born 17 July 1975) is a Belgian former professional footballer who played as a defender. He played domestically for Genk, Sint-Truiden, Anderlecht, K.V.S.K. United Overpelt-Lommel, Roeselare, and KVSK United as well for Dutch club PSV Eindhoven and English club Nottingham Forest.

== Personal life ==
Oyen is the father of the footballer Luca Oyen.

== Honours ==
Genk

- Belgian Cup: 1997–98
