= Jochem van der Hoeven =

Dutch footballer (born 1975)

Personal information
- Date of birth: 5 October 1975 (age 51)
- Place of birth: Rotterdam, Netherlands
- Positions: Defender; midfielder

Youth career
- 1985-1995: Sparta

Senior career*
Years	Team	Apps	(Gls)
1995–1996	Sparta	32	(3)
1997–1998	Vitesse	47	(2)
1998–1999	Sparta	20	(1)
2000–2003	Fortuna Sittard	88	(3)
2004	Helmond Sport	10	(2)
2004–2005	AEP	24	(0)
2005–2015	RKSV Boxtel		
Total		221	(11)

International career
1996–1998	Netherlands U21	12	(0)
- * Club domestic league appearances and goals

Jochem van der Hoeven (born 5 October 1975) is a Dutch retired footballer who played as a defender or midfielder.

== Club career ==
Van der Hoeven started his career with Dutch side Sparta Rotterdam, where he made 32 league appearances and scored 3 goals. On 1 December 1995, van der Hoeven debuted for Sparta Rotterdam during a 2–1 win over PSV. On 8 March 1996, he scored his first goal for Sparta Rotterdam during a 5–2 win over Heerenveen. In 2004, van der Hoeven signed for AEP in the Cypriot top flight. In 2005, he signed for Dutch ninth tier club RKSV Boxtel.

After retiring as a player, he became a physiotherapist. He is married and has two kids.

== International career ==
Van der Hoeven played 12 games for the Netherlands national under-21 football team.
