= Delano Hill =

Dutch footballer

Personal information
- Date of birth: 29 April 1975 (age 51)
- Place of birth: Rotterdam, Netherlands
- Height: 1.91 m (6 ft 3 in)
- Position: Centre-back

Team information
- Current team: Dordrecht (assistant coach))

Youth career
- EDS
- Neptunus
- PSV

Senior career*
Years	Team	Apps	(Gls)
1995–1996	Den Bosch	27	(1)
1996–1998	RKC	55	(4)
1998–2001	Willem II	90	(1)
2001–2005	Hansa Rostock	96	(3)
2005–2006	Austria Vienna	12	(0)
2007–2008	Willem II	35	(0)
2008–2009	Al-Wakrah		
Total		315	(9)
- * Club domestic league appearances and goals

Delano Hill (born 29 April 1975) is a Dutch retired footballer who played as a centre-back. He worked as the assisting coach of FC Dordrecht.

== Career ==
Born in Rotterdam, Hill made his debut in professional football, being part of the FC Den Bosch squad in the 1995–96 season. He also played for RKC Waalwijk, FC Hansa Rostock and Austria Wien before joining Willem II for the second time in his career.

In 2008, he joined Qatari side Al-Wakrah, before returning to the Netherlands in 2009, beginning as the assistant coach of FC Dordrecht.
