= Marcelo Ramos (footballer, born 1973) =

Brazilian footballer

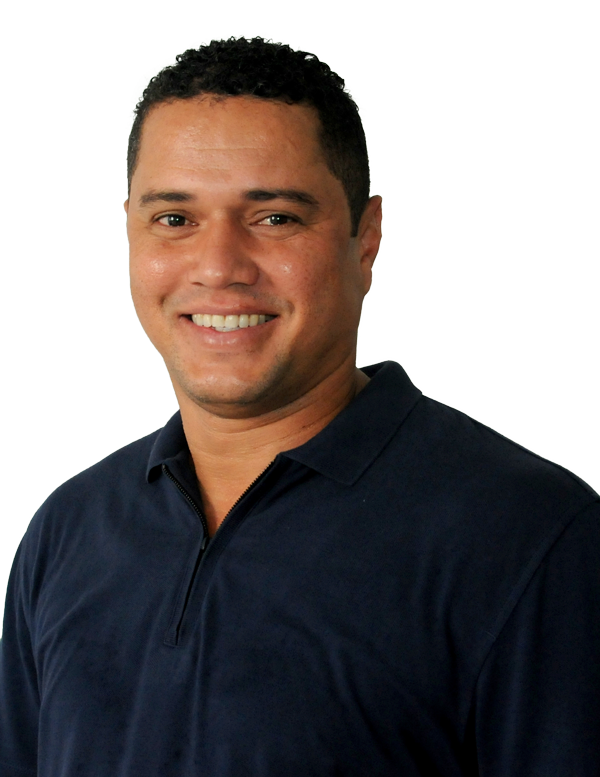

Personal information
- Full name: Marcelo Silva Ramos
- Date of birth: June 25, 1973 (age 53)
- Place of birth: Salvador, Brazil
- Height: 1.77 m (5 ft 10 in)
- Position: Striker

Youth career
- 1991–1993: Bahia

Senior career*
Years	Team	Apps	(Gls)
1994–1995	Bahia	57	(23)
1996	Cruzeiro	26	(14)
1996–1997	PSV Eindhoven	22	(11)
1997–1999	Cruzeiro	51	(18)
2000	São Paulo	18	(8)
2001–2002	Nagoya Grampus Eight	20	(6)
2002–2003	Cruzeiro	22	(6)
2003	Sanfrecce Hiroshima	32	(14)
2004	Corinthians	29	(1)
2005	Vitória		
2005–2007	Atlético Nacional	28	(4)
2007	Santa Cruz		
2007–2008	Atlético Paranaense		
2008	Bahia		
2009	Santa Cruz		
2009	Ipatinga		
2010	Madureira	28	(10)
2010	Paysandu		
2011	Madureira		
2011	Araxá		
2011	Itumbiara	2	(1)
- * Club domestic league appearances and goals

Marcelo Silva Ramos (born June 25, 1973) is a Brazilian former footballer who played as a striker.

== Career ==
Born in Bahia state, Marcelo Ramos was a prolific goal-scorer throughout his career. He played club football in Brazil, Netherlands, Japan and Colombia. He scored 12 goals for Atlético Paranaense as the club finished runner's-up in the 2008 Campeonato Paranaense.

== Club statistics ==
Club performance			League		Cup		League Cup		Total	
Season	Club	League	Apps	Goals	Apps	Goals	Apps	Goals	Apps	Goals
Brazil			League		Copa do Brasil		League Cup		Total	
1992	Bahia	Série A	17	8					17	8
1993	Bahia	Série A	14	6					14	6
1994	Bahia	Série A	26	7					26	7
1995	Cruzeiro	Série A	22	15					22	15
1996	Cruzeiro	Série A	24	10					24	10
Netherlands			League		KNVB Cup		League Cup		Total	
1996/97	PSV Eindhoven	Eredivisie	22	11					22	11
Brazil			League		Copa do Brasil		League Cup		Total	
1997	Cruzeiro	Série A	24	10					24	10
1998	Cruzeiro	Série A	29	8					29	8
1999	Cruzeiro	Série A	20	6					20	6
2000	São Paulo	Série A	20	10					20	10
2001	Cruzeiro	Série A	0	0					0	0
Japan			League		Emperor's Cup		J.League Cup		Total	
2001	Nagoya Grampus Eight	J1 League	13	3	0	0	3	0	16	3
2002	Nagoya Grampus Eight	J1 League	7	3	0	0	4	3	11	6
Brazil			League		Copa do Brasil		League Cup		Total	
2002	Cruzeiro	Série A	23	6					23	6
2003	Cruzeiro	Série A	3	0					3	0
Japan			League		Emperor's Cup		J.League Cup		Total	
2003	Sanfrecce Hiroshima	J2 League	32	14	4	1	-		36	15
Brazil			League		Copa do Brasil		League Cup		Total	
2004	Corinthians Paulista	Série A	29	1					29	1
2005	Vitória	Série B	0	0					0	0
Colombia			League		Cup		League Cup		Total	
2005	Atlético Nacional	Primera A	9	1					9	1
2006	Atlético Nacional	Primera A	19	4					19	4
Brazil			League		Copa do Brasil		League Cup		Total	
2007	Santa Cruz	Série B	16	10					16	10
2007	Atlético Paranaense	Série A	13	4					13	4
2008	Atlético Paranaense	Série A	9	2					9	2
2008	Santa Cruz	Série C								
2009	Santa Cruz	Série D								
Country	Brazil		289	103					289	103
Country	Netherlands		22	11					22	11
Country	Japan		52	20	4	1	7	3	63	24
Country	Colombia		28	5					28	5
Total			391	139	4	1	7	3	402	143

== Honours ==
=== Club ===
Bahia

- Campeonato Baiano: 1991, 1993, 1994

Cruzeiro

- Copa de Oro: 1995
- Copa Master de Supercopa: 1995
- Copa do Brasil: 1996, 2003
- Campeonato Mineiro: 1996, 1997, 1998, 2003
- Copa Libertadores: 1997
- Recopa Sudamericana: 1998
- Copa Centro Oeste: 1999
- Copa Sul-Minas: 2001, 2002

PSV

- Eredivisie: 1996-97
- Johan Cruyff Shield: 1996, 1997

Palmeiras

- Torneio Rio-São Paulo: 2000
- Copa dos Campeões: 2000
- Copa Libertadores runner-up: 2000

Vitória

- Campeonato Baiano: 2005

Ipatinga

- Campeonato Mineiro Módulo II: 2009

Paysandu

- Campeonato Paraense: 2010

Madureira

- Copa Rio: 2011

Araxá

- Campeonato Mineiro Módulo II: 2011

=== Individual ===
- Minas Gerais state league's top scorer: 1996
- Brazilian Cup's top scorer: 1996
