= Danny Hoekman =

Dutch footballer and manager (born 1964)

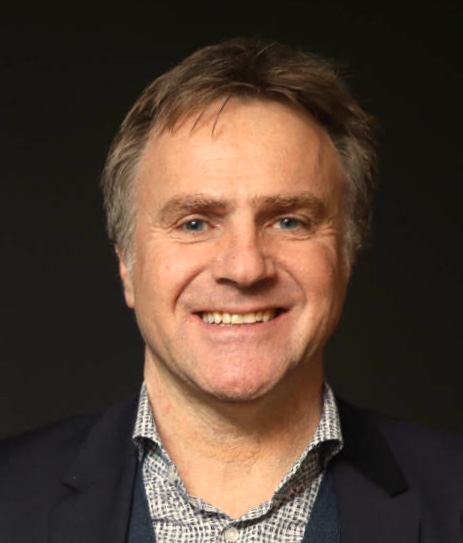

Personal information
- Full name: Danny Hoekman
- Date of birth: September 21, 1964 (age 62)
- Place of birth: Nijmegen, Netherlands
- Position: Winger

Senior career*
Years	Team	Apps	(Gls)
1983–1986	N.E.C.	81	(17)
1986–1988	Roda JC	25	(3)
1988–1989	FC VVV	16	(3)
1989–1991	FC Den Haag	42	(6)
1991–1992	Manchester City	1	(0)
1992	Southampton	0	(0)
1992–1993	ADO Den Haag	24	(6)
1993–1997	N.E.C.	51	(13)
Total		240	(48)

Managerial career
- 2003–2004: Al Shahaniya
- 2004: Bonner SC
- 2005: FC Hämeenlinna
- 2010: Racing Mechelen
- 2010–2011: Mesaimeer
- * Club domestic league appearances and goals

Danny Hoekman (born September 21, 1964) is a retired footballer who briefly played as a midfielder in the Football League for Manchester City. He was severely injured by FC Utrecht goalkeeper Jan-Willem van Ede in 1987; he received a financial compensation twenty years later.

In July 2016, he was appointed technical manager of N.E.C. but was dismissed in January 2017.

Himself a left winger when he was active as a player, Hoekman wrote a book about left sided players.
