= Ovidiu Stîngă =

Romanian footballer and manager

Personal information
- Date of birth: 5 December 1972 (age 53)
- Place of birth: Craiova, Romania
- Height: 1.72 m (5 ft 8 in)
- Position: Central midfielder

Team information
- Current team: Al Sadd U19 (head coach)

Youth career
- –1990: Viitorul Craiova

Senior career*
Years	Team	Apps	(Gls)
1990–1994	Universitatea Craiova	106	(29)
1991	→ Jiul IELIF Craiova (loan)		
1995–1996	Salamanca	50	(14)
1997–2001	PSV	52	(7)
2001–2002	Dinamo București	18	(0)
2002–2004	Universitatea Craiova	35	(5)
2004–2005	Helmond Sport	19	(1)
2005–2007	Universitatea Craiova	32	(5)
Total		312	(61)

International career
1992–1993	Romania U21	3	(0)
1993–1999	Romania	24	(0)

Managerial career
- 2005–2006: Universitatea Craiova (player/coach)
- 2007: Universitatea Craiova (caretaker)
- 2009–2010: PSV Eindhoven (youth)
- 2010–2011: Romania U18
- 2011–2012: Romania U19
- 2013–2014: CS Universitatea Craiova
- 2015–2020: PSV Women (assistant)
- 2020–2021: FC U Craiova
- 2021–: Al Sadd U19
- * Club domestic league appearances and goals

Ovidiu Stîngă (born 5 December 1972) is a Romanian professional football manager and former player, currently in charge of Al Sadd U19.

== Club career ==
=== Universitatea Craiova and Jiul IELIF Craiova ===
Stîngă was born on 5 December 1972 in Craiova, Romania and began playing junior-level football at Viitorul. He made his Divizia A debut by playing for Universitatea Craiova on 28 November 1990 under coach Sorin Cârțu in a 8–1 win over Corvinul Hunedoara. That was his only appearance for the club that season, during which Universitatea won The Double. In the middle of the campaign, he was loaned to Divizia C club Jiul IELIF Craiova, helping them secure promotion to the second league. In the 1992–93 season, Stîngă scored a career-best 12 league goals for Universitatea, and played the entire match under coach Marian Bondrea in the 2–0 victory against Dacia Unirea Brăila in the 1993 Cupa României final. The team reached another cup final in 1994, where he played the full 90 minutes under Bondrea in the 1–0 loss to Gloria Bistrița.

=== Salamanca ===
In summer 1995, Stîngă went abroad to Spain to play for Salamanca which paid a $500,000 fee to "U" Craiova. He debuted in Primera División on 3 September, when coach Juan Manuel Lillo sent him in the 60th minute to replace Joan Barbarà in a 3–1 win against Espanyol. He scored his first goal in the competition on 5 November in a 4–1 victory against Barcelona. During the 1995–96 season, he netted 11 goals, including a hat-trick in a 5–0 success over Racing Santander, but the club finished last and were relegated to Segunda División. In the middle of the 1996–97 season, PSV acquired Stîngă for a $4.5 million transfer fee. His time at Salamanca was considered a success by the club's officials, and in the following years other Romanian players were brought to the club, such as Bogdan Stelea, Cătălin Munteanu, Lucian Marinescu and Gabriel Popescu, with the team being nicknamed "Salamanca Rumana".

=== PSV ===
Stîngă made his Eredivisie debut on 16 February 1997 under coach Dick Advocaat in a 1–0 loss to Vitesse. He made seven league appearances over the course of the season, helping the team win the title. On 4 October 1997, he scored his first league goal in a 3–1 win over Heerenveen. PSV reached the 1997–98 KNVB Cup final, where he played as a starter under Advocaat in the 5–0 loss to Ajax. Following an injury while playing for Romania during the 1998 World Cup, he missed the entire 1998–99 season. Stîngă won another championship in the 1999–2000 season, playing 18 matches and scoring once under coach Eric Gerets. His last Eredivisie appearance took place on 20 May 2001 when Gerets sent him on in the 73rd minute to substitute Björn van der Doelen in a 4–3 victory over De Graafschap, marking his only match of the 2000–01 season as the club secured another title. During these years, Stîngă also made eight appearances in the Champions League over the course of two editions, including victories against Newcastle United and Bayern Munich.

=== Dinamo București ===
In the summer of 2001 he returned to Romania, signing with Dinamo București. His first match was a 2–1 loss to rivals Steaua București in the 2001 Supercupa României. Stîngă made 18 goalless league appearances under coaches Marin Ion and Cornel Dinu, helping the team win the 2001–02 championship. Dinamo also reached the Cupa României final, but he did not play in the 2–1 loss to Rapid București.

=== Universitatea Craiova and Helmond Sport ===
In 2002, Stîngă returned to Universitatea Craiova. For the 2004–05 season, he went to play for Dutch Eerste Divisie side Helmond Sport. In 2005, he made a comeback to "U" Craiova as a player-coach in Divizia B and helped the team gain promotion in the first league in the 2005–06 season. Subsequently, he made his last Divizia A appearance on 15 September 2006 in a 3–3 draw against Politehnica Iași, totaling 146 matches with 34 goals in the competition and 17 games in European competitions.

== International career ==
=== Early years and 1994 World Cup ===
Stîngă played 24 matches for Romania, making his debut on 31 January 1993 under coach Cornel Dinu in a 3–0 friendly loss to Ecuador. Subsequently, he played in a 2–1 win over Cyprus in the successful 1994 World Cup qualifiers. He was selected by coach Emerich Jenei to be part of the squad for the final tournament where the team reached the quarter-finals, but he did not play in any games in the campaign.

=== Euro 1996 and 1998 World Cup ===
Stîngă was part of the Euro 1996 final tournament, where the team lost all three group stage games against France, Bulgaria and Spain. Coach Anghel Iordănescu used him only in the 2–1 loss to the Spanish side in which Stîngă provided the assist to Florin Răducioiu's goal.

During the 1998 World Cup qualifiers, Stîngă made two appearances in wins over Lithuania and Macedonia. He played under coach Iordănescu in the victories against Colombia and England in the group stage of the final tournament, but suffered a knee injury in the latter game, causing him to miss the other matches. The victories against the Colombians and the English secured the mathematical qualification before the last group match against Tunisia. To celebrate, the team dyed their hair blonde and showed up on the pitch with their new look. The campaign ended as they were defeated 1–0 by Croatia in the round of 16 after Davor Šuker scored from a penalty.

=== Final years ===
Stîngă's last two matches for Romania were away victories against Slovakia and Liechtenstein in the Euro 2000 qualifiers.

For representing his country at three final tournaments, Stîngă was decorated by President of Romania Traian Băsescu on 25 March 2008 with the Ordinul "Meritul Sportiv" – (The Medal "The Sportive Merit") class III.

== Managerial career ==
Stîngă began his managerial career in 2005, as a player-coach for Divizia B club Universitatea Craiova, helping them achieve promotion to the first league by the end of the 2005–06 season. Following only one victory in the first nine rounds of the 2006–07 season, he was dismissed. He came back to the team in August 2007, but his tenure lasted just two games, which were losses.

From 2009 to 2010, Stîngă coached a youth squad of PSV Eindhoven. In the following years, he worked for Romania's under-18 and under-19 national teams, teaching players such as Nicolae Stanciu, Florin Andone and Steliano Filip.

In October 2013, Stîngă was appointed the head coach of second-tier club CS Universitatea Craiova, but he terminated his contract by mutual agreement in March 2014. Between 2015 and 2020, he worked as an assistant for PSV Women's team. In December 2020, he was named the head coach of Liga II side FC U Craiova. He was dismissed in March 2021, after the team failed to win any of the three matches under his charge.

In September 2021, Stîngă went back to working with juniors, signing with Al Sadd.

== Personal life ==
In 1994, Stîngă was named Honorary Citizen of Bucharest.

== Career statistics ==
=== International stats ===
Appearances and goals by national team and year
National team	Year	Apps	Goals
Romania	1993	6	0
Romania	1994	3	0
Romania	1995	2	0
Romania	1996	5	0
Romania	1997	0	0
Romania	1998	6	0
Romania	1999	2	0
Total		24	0

== Honours ==
=== Player ===
Jiul IELIF Craiova

- Divizia C: 1990–91

Universitatea Craiova

- Divizia A: 1990–91
- Divizia B: 2005–06
- Cupa României: 1990–91, 1992–93, runner-up 1993–94

PSV

- Eredivisie: 1996–97, 1999–2000, 2000–01
- KNVB Cup runner-up: 1997–98

Dinamo București

- Divizia A: 2001–02
- Cupa României runner-up: 2001–02
- Supercupa României runner-up: 2001

=== Manager ===
Universitatea Craiova

- Divizia B: 2005–06
