= Joonas Kolkka =

Finnish footballer (born 1974)

Personal information
- Full name: Joonas Einari Kolkka
- Date of birth: 28 September 1974 (age 52)
- Place of birth: Lahti, Finland
- Height: 1.74 m (5 ft 9 in)
- Position: Winger

Youth career
- Reipas Lahti

Senior career*
Years	Team	Apps	(Gls)
1991–1993	Reipas Lahti	34	(19)
1993–1995	MyPa	43	(17)
1996–1998	Willem II	68	(16)
1998–2001	PSV	78	(10)
2001–2003	Panathinaikos	45	(3)
2003–2004	Borussia Mönchengladbach	28	(2)
2004–2005	Crystal Palace	26	(3)
2005–2006	ADO Den Haag	31	(8)
2006–2007	Feyenoord	22	(3)
2007–2011	NAC Breda	113	(8)
2011–2012	Willem II	13	(1)
2012	Texas Dutch Lions	15	(2)
Total		516	(92)

International career
1994–2010	Finland	98	(11)
- * Club domestic league appearances and goals

Joonas Einari Kolkka (born 28 September 1974) is a Finnish retired professional footballer who played as a left winger most of his career, but could also play on the right wing. Having started his career in his native Finland, he went on to play for several clubs in the Netherlands, Greece, Germany, England, and the USA.

== Club career ==
Born in Lahti, Kolkka started his career with Reipas Lahti and MyPa in Finland's Veikkausliiga. He won the Finnish Cup with MyPa in 1995 before joining Netherlands' Willem II the same year. In 1998 Kolkka joined Dutch club PSV Eindhoven on a four-year contract. At PSV he won two league championships and got to play in the UEFA Champions League. Kolkka then moved to Greek side Panathinaikos in 2001 for a transfer fee of €2.3 million, and he spent two seasons there. After leaving Greece, Kolkka played a season each for Borussia Mönchengladbach of the German Bundesliga, and in Crystal Palace of the English Premier League, to which he transferred for a fee of €750.000. He scored at both Anfield and Old Trafford during his stay at the club, and also scored in the thrilling 3–3 draw with Norwich. He was released by Palace, and returned to the Netherlands in 2005, signing a one-year deal with ADO Den Haag. After an impressive season with ADO, he was signed by Dutch side Feyenoord in the summer of 2006, and played until summer 2011 for NAC Breda. In 2011, he was signed by his former club, Willem II, being employed as a player and a sales manager of the club.

On 4 May 2012, it was announced that Kolkka had signed a three-month-contract with Texas Dutch Lions, in the third level of American football (not Dayton Dutch Lions). After his contract with the Dutch Lions expired, Kolkka returned to the Netherlands, working as a youth coach for his former club PSV.

== International career ==
Kolkka made his debut for the Finland national team on 26 October 1994 against Estonia, and was a regular in the Finland lineup until 2010.

== Career statistics ==
=== Club ===
As of 31 December 2020

Appearances and goals by club, season and competition
Club	Season	League			National cup (Note: Includes Suomen Cup, KNVB Beker, Kypello Elladas and DFB-Pokal)		Other		Continental		Total	
Club	Season	Division	Apps	Goals	Apps	Goals	Apps	Goals	Apps	Goals	Apps	Goals
Reipas Lahti	1991	Veikkausliiga	4	0			—		—		4	0
Reipas Lahti	1992	Ykkönen					—		—			
Reipas Lahti	1993	Kakkonen					—		—			
Reipas Lahti	Total		34	19			—		—		34	19
MyPa	1994	Veikkausliiga	21	11	0	0	0	0	2 (Note: Includes UEFA Cup)	2	23	13
MyPa	1995	Veikkausliiga	22	6	0	0	0	0	4	0	26	6
MyPa	Total		43	17	0	0	0	0	6	2	49	19
Willem II	1995–96	Eredivisie	7	0	0	0	—		—		7	0
Willem II	1996–97	Eredivisie	32	7	0	0	—		—		32	7
Willem II	1997–98	Eredivisie	29	9	0	0	—		—		29	9
Willem II	Total		68	16	0	0	0	0	0	0	68	16
PSV	1998–99	Eredivisie	19	1	3	0	1 (Note: Includes Johan Cruyff Shield)	0	7 (Note: Includes UEFA Champions League)	0	30	1
PSV	1999–00	Eredivisie	32	5	0	0	—		6	0	38	5
PSV	2000–01	Eredivisie	27	4	3	0	—		11 (Note: Includes UEFA Champions League and UEFA Cup)	0	41	4
PSV	Total		78	10	6	0	1	0	24	0	109	10
Panathninaikos	2001–02	Super League Greece	23	2	4	1	—		12	1	39	4
Panathninaikos	2002–03	Super League Greece	22	1	7	0	—		5	0	34	1
Panathninaikos	Total		45	3	11	1	0	0	17	1	73	5
Borussia Mönchengladbach	2003–04	Bundesliga	28	2	5	1	—		—		33	3
Crystal Palace	2004–05	Premier League	23	3	0	0	1 (Note: Includes EFL League Cup)	0	—		24	3
Crystal Palace	2005–06	Championship	3	0	0	0	1	0	—		4	0
Crystal Palace	Total		26	3	0	0	2	0	0	0	28	3
ADO Den Haag	2005–06	Eredivisie	31	8	—		—		—		31	8
Feyenoord	2006–07	Eredivisie	22	3	0	0	1	0	4	0	27	3
NAC Breda	2007–08	Eredivisie	32	2	5	0	5	0	—		42	2
NAC Breda	2008–09	Eredivisie	30	3	5	1	4	1	2 (Note: Includes UEFA Intertoto Cup)	0	41	5
NAC Breda	2009–10	Eredivisie	31	0	3	0	0	0	5 (Note: Includes UEFA Europa League)	0	39	0
NAC Breda	2010–11	Eredivisie	20	3	3	0	—		—		23	3
NAC Breda	Total		113	8	16	1	9	1	7	0	146	10
Willem II	2011–12	Eerste Divisie	13	1	1	0	—		—		14	1
Texas Dutch Lions	2012	USL PDL	15	2	—		—		—		15	2
Career total			516	90	39	2	13	1	58	3	624	96

=== International ===
Appearances and goals by national team and year
National team	Year	Apps	Goals
Finland	1994	2	1
Finland	1995	2	1
Finland	1996	5	1
Finland	1997	2	0
Finland	1998	7	1
Finland	1999	7	2
Finland	2000	6	0
Finland	2001	6	2
Finland	2002	7	1
Finland	2003	9	2
Finland	2004	9	0
Finland	2005	4	0
Finland	2006	8	0
Finland	2007	9	0
Finland	2008	7	0
Finland	2009	7	0
Finland	2010	1	0
Total		98	11

Scores and results list Finland's goal tally first, score column indicates score after each Kolkka goal.

List of international goals scored by Joonas Kolkka
No.	Date	Venue	Opponent	Score	Result	Competition
1	26 October 1994	Tallinn, Estonia	Estonia		7–0	Friendly
2	16 February 1995	Trinidad, Trinidad and Tobago.	Trinidad and Tobago		2–2	Friendly
3	6 October 1996	Helsinki, Finland	Switzerland		2–3	1998 FIFA World Cup qualification
4	5 September 1998	Helsinki, Finland	Moldova		3–2	UEFA Euro 2000 qualifying
5	9 October 1999	Helsinki, Finland	Northern Ireland		4–1	UEFA Euro 2000 qualifying
6	9 October 1999	Helsinki, Finland	Northern Ireland		4–1	UEFA Euro 2000 qualifying
7	15 August 2001	Helsinki, Finland	Belgium		4–1	Friendly
8	5 September 2001	Helsinki, Finland	Greece		5–1	2002 FIFA World Cup qualification
9	27 March 2002	Porto, Portugal	Portugal		4–1	Friendly
10	7 June 2003	Helsinki, Finland	Serbia and Montenegro		3–0	UEFA Euro 2004 qualifying
11	11 October 2003	Tampere, Finland	Canada		3–2	Friendly

== Honours ==
MyPa

- Finnish Cup: 1995

PSV

- Eredivisie: 1999–2000, 2000–01
- Johan Cruyff Shield: 1998

Finland

- Nordic Football Championship: 2000–01
