= Maikel Renfurm =

Dutch footballer (born 1976)

Personal information
- Full name: Maikel Steven Renfurm
- Date of birth: 8 July 1976 (age 50)
- Place of birth: Paramaribo, Suriname
- Height: 1.80 m (5 ft 11 in)
- Position: Forward

Youth career
- Dynamo'67
- Sparta Rotterdam

Senior career*
Years	Team	Apps	(Gls)
1994–1998	Sparta Rotterdam	89	(13)
1998–2000	N.E.C.	50	(15)
2000	KR	7	(1)
2000–2001	St Mirren	16	(1)
2001	LR Ahlen	8	(0)
2002	Preston North End	0	(0)
2002–2003	Herfølge BK	14	(1)
2003	Sparta Rotterdam	12	(0)
2004–2005	FC Kranenburg		
2005–2006	Haaglandia		
2006–2009	Voorschoten '97		
2009–2010	Haaglandia		
2010–2011	Westlandia		

Managerial career
- 2011–: Westlandia (assistant)
- * Club domestic league appearances and goals

Maikel Renfurm (born 8 July 1976 in Paramaribo, Suriname) is a Dutch professional football player. Currently he is assistant manager at Westlandia after retiring from the game in 2011.

He was Dutch Cup finalist in 2000 with N.E.C. and later that year became Icelandic champion with KR.
