= Marciano Vink =

Dutch footballer (born 1970)

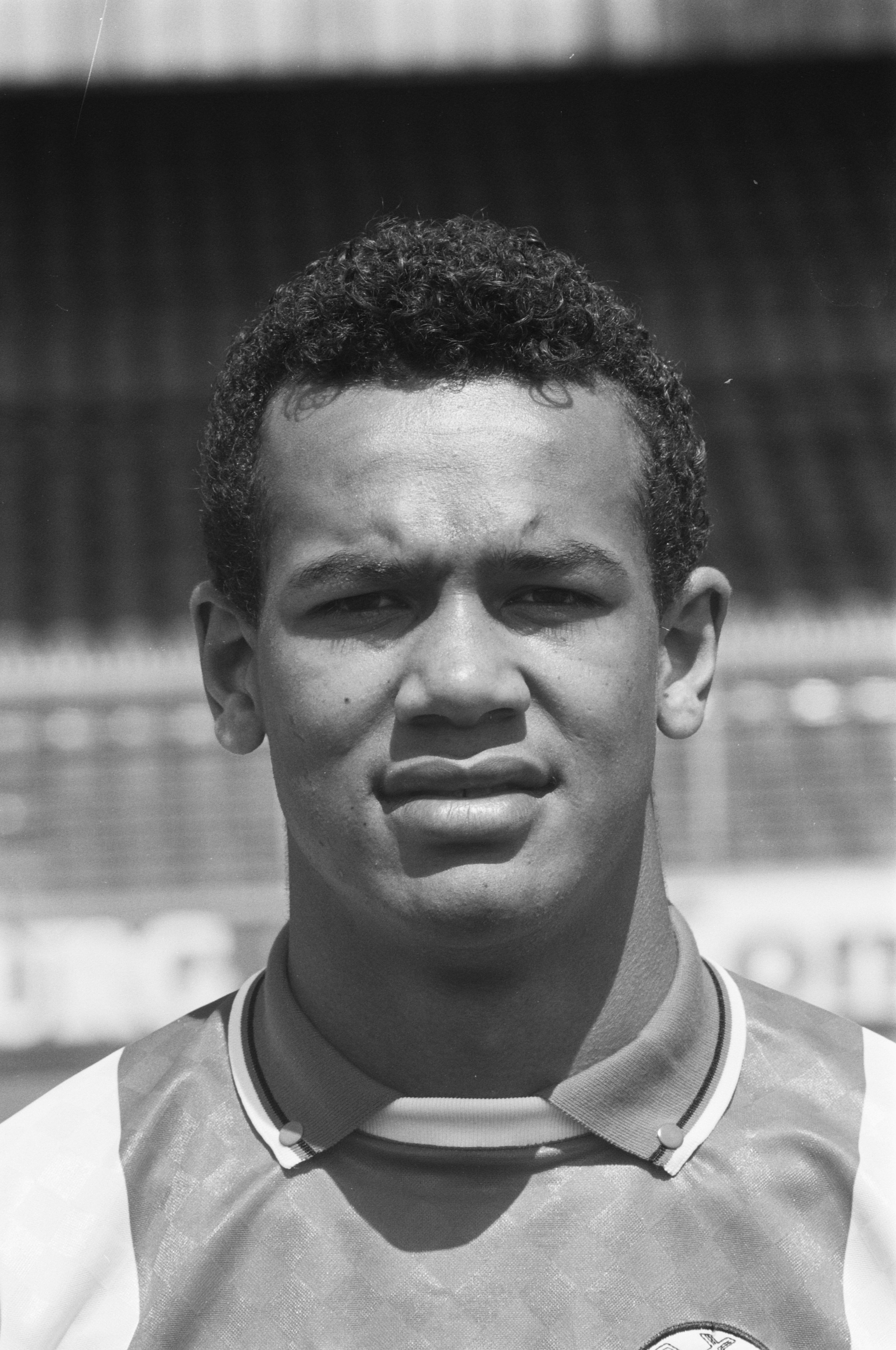
- Vink in 1989

Personal information
- Full name: Marciano Carlos Alberto Vink
- Date of birth: 17 October 1970 (age 56)
- Place of birth: Paramaribo, Suriname
- Height: 1.81 m (5 ft 11 in)
- Position: Midfielder

Youth career
- TOS Actief
- ADE

Senior career*
Years	Team	Apps	(Gls)
1988–1993	Ajax	108	(13)
1993–1994	Genoa	13	(2)
1994–1999	PSV Eindhoven	49	(5)
1999–2000	ADO Den Haag	5	(0)
2001–2002	Ajax Cape Town	13	(1)
Total		188	(21)

International career
1991	Netherlands	2	(0)
- * Club domestic league appearances and goals

Marciano Carlos Alberto Vink (born 17 October 1970) is a Dutch former professional footballer. Throughout his career he played primarily as a right defensive midfielder and as a right central defender. Born in Suriname, he played for the Netherlands national team. He most notably played for Ajax and PSV in the Eredivisie and Genoa in the Serie A. Injury prone since the very beginning of his career, he was forced to quit prematurely at the age of 28.

== Club career ==
=== Early years ===
Born a few months after the 1970 FIFA World Cup into a family of football fans in Paramaribo, Suriname, Vink thanks his middle names to the feats of the Brazil national football team that year, as he was named after its captain Carlos Alberto Torres. The Vink family moved to the Netherlands, and it was there that young Marciano learned his trade at TOS Actief and ADE in Amsterdam. A prolific young player, Vink's talents were soon noticed by the Ajax scouts and it wasn't before long he was admitted to play a notable side (in European football history).

=== Career with Ajax ===
He swiftly rose through ranks of Ajax's youth Academy with a number of extremely talented players such as: Dennis Bergkamp, Frank de Boer, Ronald de Boer, Richard Witschge, Bryan Roy, and Michel Kreek. Vink was deemed to be a huge prospect and was heralded to become the next Frank Rijkaard. His rise through the youth ranks and his debut at the age of 18 in 1988 were, however, no indication of how his career would ultimately unfold. He would play 108 matches in his five-year stint with Ajax until coach Louis van Gaal decided to dismantle the team that won the UEFA Cup in 1992 to make way for a younger generation of players such as Patrick Kluivert, Clarence Seedorf, Michael Reiziger, and Edgar Davids. In 1993, Vink therefore opted for Italian side Genoa.

=== Career continued ===
Vink's spell with Genoa turned out to be a disappointment. He played only 13 matches (2 goals), in a season which saw Genoa narrowly avoid relegation to Serie B. He quickly decided to move back to the Netherlands with top side PSV Eindhoven. Although PSV Eindhoven was progressively starting to challenge Ajax for the domination of the Eredivisie, Vink did not play the part his coaches might have had in mind for him as he was often sidelined through injury. In 1997, his injury plagued stay with PSV came to a grinding halt as Luís Figo made an uncompromising tackle in the Champions League match FC Barcelona - PSV. He spent the next two seasons rehabilitating, but to no avail. In 1999, his contract expired and was not extended. He played only 48 matches in 5 seasons and was left with a damaged reputation. He joined 1st division outfit ADO Den Haag on amateur basis to revitalize his career, but only played 5 competition matches. After this, one could not help but think that the career of Vink was over. However, Vink showed his resilience by returning to professional football briefly, to show the critics that he had just been unlucky in his career and that he was indeed a quality player. He played one more season with the Ajax satellite club Ajax Cape Town. The 1992 UEFA Cup winner turned out to be a more than welcome addition to the squad. In 2002, he permanently retired from professional football and became a player agent.

== International career ==
Marciano Vink has capped twice for the Netherlands in 1991, at the height of his career. At the age of 20 he was called up by national team coach Rinus Michels for the European Championship qualifier matches for Sweden 1992, against Malta and Finland. He earned two caps in one month, but was never called up again, mostly due to injuries.

== Career statistics ==
Appearances and goals by club, season and competition
Club	Season	League			National Cup		Continental		Other		Total	
Club	Season	Division	Apps	Goals	Apps	Goals	Apps	Goals	Apps	Goals	Apps	Goals
Ajax	1988–89	Eredivisie	2	1	0	0	1	0	–		3	1
Ajax	1989–90	Eredivisie	21	2	3	0	2	0	–		26	2
Ajax	1990–91	Eredivisie	27	1	2	0	–		–		29	1
Ajax	1991–92	Eredivisie	27	1	1	0	9	0	–		37	1
Ajax	1992–93	Eredivisie	31	8	4	2	8	1	–		43	11
Ajax	Total		108	13	10	2	20	1	0	0	138	16
Genoa	1993–94	Serie A	13	2					–		13	2
PSV	1994–95	Eredivisie	6	1	1	0	2	0	–		9	1
PSV	1995–96	Eredivisie	23	2	5	1	7	1	–		35	4
PSV	1996–97	Eredivisie	19	2	2	0	3	0	1 (Note: Appearance in Johan Cruyff Shield)	0	25	2
PSV	1997–98	Eredivisie	1	0	0	0	0	0	–		1	0
PSV	Total		49	5	8	1	12	1	1	0	70	7
ADO Den Haag	1999–2000	Eerste Divisie	5	0			–		–		5	0
Ajax Cape Town	2001–02	South African Premier Division	13	1					–		13	1
Career total			188	21	18	3	32	2	1	0	239	26

== Honours ==
Ajax

- Eredivisie: 1989–90
- KNVB Cup: 1992–93
- UEFA Cup: 1991–92

PSV

- Eredivisie: 1996–97
- KNVB Cup: 1995–96
- Johan Cruyff Shield: 1996, 1997, 1998
