= Gilles De Bilde =

Belgian footballer

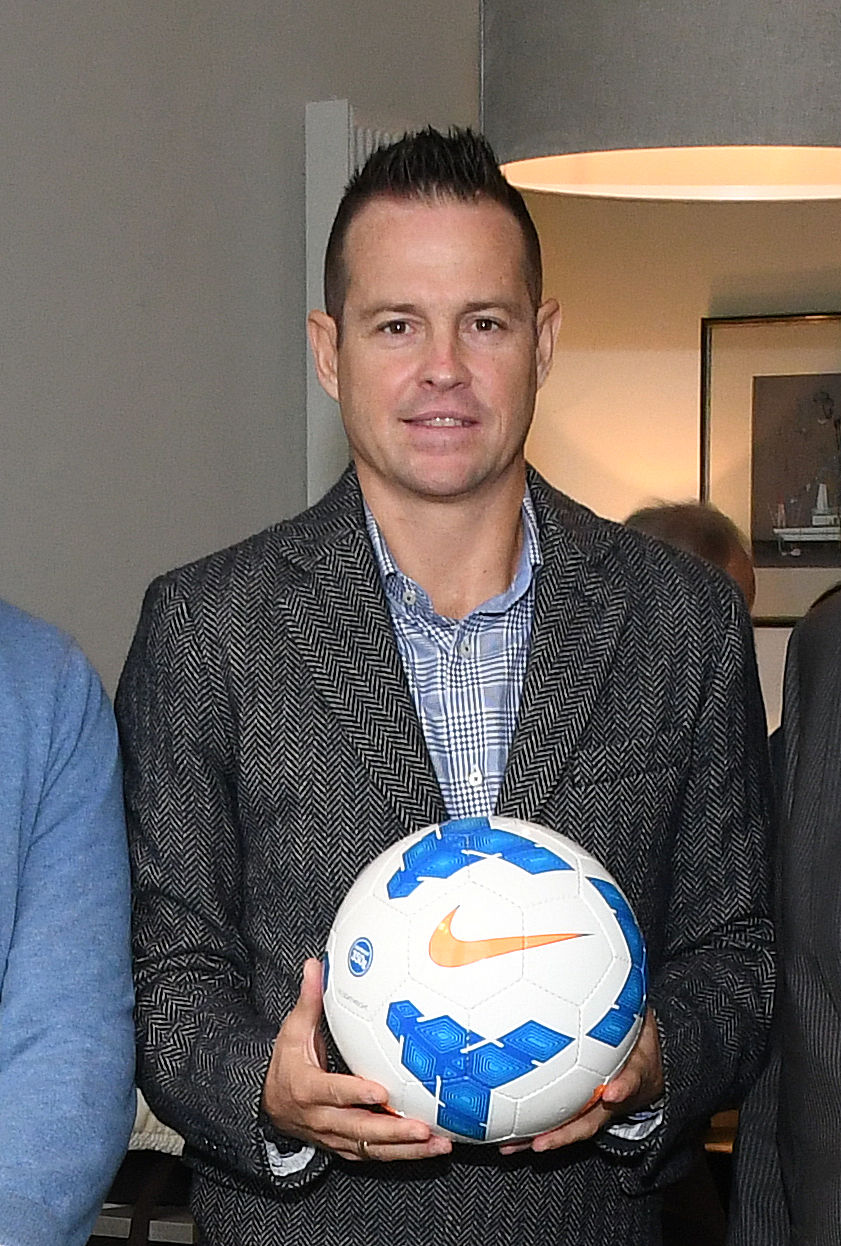

Personal information
- Date of birth: 9 June 1971 (age 55)
- Place of birth: Zellik, Belgium
- Height: 1.80 m (5 ft 11 in)
- Position: Striker

Senior career*
| Years | Team | Apps | (Gls) |
| 1992–1995 | Eendracht Aalst | 86 | (40) |
| 1995–1997 | Anderlecht | 46 | (22) |
| 1997–1999 | PSV | 49 | (24) |
| 1999–2001 | Sheffield Wednesday | 59 | (13) |
| 2000–2001 | → Aston Villa (loan) | 4 | (0) |
| 2001–2003 | Anderlecht | 44 | (14) |
| 2003–2004 | Lierse | 15 | (1) |
| 2005–2007 | Willebroek-Meerhof | | |
| Total | | 303 | (114) |

International career
| 1994–2000 | Belgium | 25 | (3) |
- * Club domestic league appearances and goals

Gilles De Bilde (born 9 June 1971) is a Belgian former professional footballer, sports pundit and television personality.

As a player, he was a striker who notably played in the Premier League for Sheffield Wednesday and Aston Villa, and in the Eredivise for PSV. He also played in his home country for Eendracht Aalst, Anderlecht and Lierse, before retiring with a brief spell with Belgian amateurs Willebroek-Meerhof

He was capped by Belgium at international level, making 25 appearances and scoring three goals. He was part of the Euro 2000 squad.

== Club career ==
At Eendracht Aalst, he won the 1994 Belgian Player of the Year, and scored 21 goals in 33 league games during the 1994–95 season. He joined Anderlecht in the summer of 1995 and managed a further 22 goals in 46 Belgian First Division matches. In a match between Anderlecht and Aalst in December 1996, he punched Krist Porte in the face, which broke his nose and injured his eye. Previously, De Bilde received a suspended two-year prison sentence in 1992 for head-butting two boy scout leaders and, four months before the Porte incident, he head-butted one nurse and punched another when he was denied access to a hospital room his father was in, having suffered a brain haemorrhage. Johan Boskamp, Anderlecht's head coach, suggested that De Bilde should see a psychiatrist.

In January 1997, De Bilde was transferred to Dutch side PSV for £3 million. During his time in Eindhoven, he scored 24 goals in 49 Eredivisie matches. His seven goals in eight league matches during the second half of the 1996–97 season helped PSV become Dutch champions. He joined Sheffield Wednesday in August 1999 and scored ten league goals in his first season with the club, but was unable to prevent them from being relegated from the Premier League. In October 2000, he joined Aston Villa on loan for three months. He made four league appearances for the club, without scoring, and returned to Sheffield Wednesday in January 2001, where he stayed for the remainder of the season, after a number of potential transfers failed to materialise. He returned to Anderlecht in July 2001 on a free transfer, having signed a three-year contract. Two years later, De Bilde joined Lierse, where he finished his professional career at the end of the 2003–04 season. He played for Willebroek-Meerhof of the Belgian Promotion between 2005 and 2007. De Bilde – who campaigned for a European ban on cat and dog fur – was fined by the club in 2006 for missing a match to mourn the death of one of his dogs.

== International career ==
De Bilde was capped 25 times by Belgium at international level. He was a member of the squad at Euro 2000 and made one appearance at the finals, in a 2–0 defeat against Turkey.

== Media career ==
After retiring, De Bilde became a regular football analyst on Belgian television, featuring on their domestic and Champions League coverage. He appeared as a model for Belgian fashion designer Dirk Bikkembergs, and has appearances on television shows involving celebrity challenges, including Dancing on Ice and Celebrity Shock.

== Career statistics ==
Appearances and goals by club, season and competition
| Club | Season | League | | | National cup (Note: Includes Belgian Cup, KNVB Cup, FA Cup) | | Europe | | Other | | Total | |
| Club | Season | Division | Apps | Goals | Apps | Goals | Apps | Goals | Apps | Goals | Apps | Goals |
|---|---|---|---|---|---|---|---|---|---|---|---|---|
| Eendracht Aalst | 1992–93 | Second Division | 9 | 2 | 2 | 0 | — | | — | | 11 | 2 |
| Eendracht Aalst | 1993–94 | Second Division | 16 | 9 | 3 | 3 | — | | 5 (Note: Appearances in Play Off Belgian First Division) | 3 | 24 | 15 |
| Eendracht Aalst | 1994–95 | First Division | 33 | 21 | 5 | 0 | — | | — | | 38 | 21 |
| Eendracht Aalst | Total | | 58 | 32 | 10 | 3 | — | | 5 | 3 | 62 | 36 |
| Anderlecht | 1995–96 | First Division | 28 | 15 | 3 | 1 | 2 (Note: Appearances in UEFA Champions League qualifying round) | 1 | 1 (Note: Appearances in Belgian Super Cup) | 0 | 34 | 17 |
| Anderlecht | 1996–97 | First Division | 18 | 7 | 1 | 0 | 6 (Note: Appearances in UEFA Cup) | 1 | — | | 25 | 8 |
| Anderlecht | Total | | 46 | 22 | 4 | 1 | 8 | 2 | 1 | 0 | 59 | 25 |
| PSV | 1996–97 | Eredivisie | 8 | 7 | — | | 6 (Note: Appearances in UEFA Champions League) | 3 | — | | 14 | 10 |
| PSV | 1997–98 | Eredivisie | 21 | 13 | 2 | 0 | — | | 1 (Note: Appearances in Johan Cruyff Shield) | 1 | 24 | 14 |
| PSV | 1998–99 | Eredivisie | 20 | 4 | 3 | 3 | 5 (Note: 3 appearances in UEFA Champions League, 2 in UEFA Champions League qualifying rounds) | 1 | 1 | 0 | 29 | 8 |
| PSV | Total | | 49 | 24 | 5 | 3 | 11 | 4 | 2 | 1 | 67 | 32 |
| Sheffield Wednesday | 1999–2000 | Premier League | 38 | 10 | 4 | 0 | — | | 3 (Note: Appearances in EFL Cup) | 1 | 45 | 11 |
| Sheffield Wednesday | 2000–01 | First Division | 21 | 3 | — | | — | | — | | 21 | 3 |
| Sheffield Wednesday | Total | | 59 | 13 | 4 | 0 | 0 | 0 | 3 | 1 | 66 | 14 |
| Aston Villa | 2000–2001 | Premier League | 4 | 0 | — | | — | | 0 | 0 | 4 | 0 |
| Anderlecht | 2001–02 | First Division | 27 | 11 | 1 | 0 | 8 (Note: 4 appearances in UEFA Champions League, 4 in 2001–02 UEFA Champions League qualifying rounds) | 0 | 0 | 0 | 36 | 11 |
| Anderlecht | 2002–03 | First Division | 17 | 3 | 2 | 0 | 4 | 1 | 1 | 0 | 24 | 4 |
| Anderlecht | Total | | 44 | 14 | 3 | 0 | 12 | 1 | 1 | 0 | 60 | 15 |
| Lierse | 2003–04 | First Division | 15 | 1 | 1 | 0 | — | | — | | 16 | 1 |
| Career total | | | 275 | 106 | 27 | 7 | 31 | 7 | 12 | 5 | 334 | 123 |

== Honours ==
Anderlecht

- Belgian Supercup: 1995, 2001

PSV Eindhoven

- Eredivisie: 1996–97
- KNVB Cup runner-up: 1997–98
- Johan Cruijff Shield: 1997, 1998

Individual

- Belgian Golden Shoe: 1994
- Belgian Second Division top scorer: 1993–94 (16 goals)
