= Emiel van Eijkeren =

Dutch footballer

Personal information
- Date of birth: 27 July 1967 (age 59)
- Place of birth: The Hague, Netherlands
- Position: Forward

Youth career
- ZVV

Senior career*
Years	Team	Apps	(Gls)
1990–1994	FC Den Haag	114	(39)
1994–1998	NEC	114	(32)
1998–1999	Utrecht	31	(3)
1999–2002	ADO Den Haag	58	(23)
Total		317	(97)
- * Club domestic league appearances and goals

Emiel van Eijkeren (born 27 July 1967) is a Dutch former professional footballer who played as a forward.

== Career ==
Van Eijkeren was born in The Hague, but early on him and his family moved to Zaandam, where his father went to work for a large company, Bruynzeel. He began playing football in Zaandam with local amateur club ZVV. In 1990, he moved to ADO Den Haag, then still named FC Den Haag, managed by Co Adriaanse. He had been on a trial with AZ prior to signing with Den Haag, which proved unsuccessful. He made his debut on 28 August 1990 against FC Twente. He played there for four seasons, two of which in the Eredivisie. Van Eijkeren made 114 appearances and 39 goals during his first stint in Den Haag.

He then played four seasons for NEC, recording 114 league matches and 32 goals. One of these goals came in the relegation play-offs in 1997 against VVV-Venlo, a penalty-kick securing a 3–2 win which heeded NEC from relegation from the Eredivisie, and earned Van Eijkeren the nickname "The Saviour" among fans of the club. His performances earned him a transfer to FC Utrecht in February 1998, joining the club alongside Alfons Groenendijk. Ahead of the 1999–2000 season, he returned to ADO Den Haag and played three more seasons, in which he made 58 league appearances and scored 23 goals. His contract was terminated by mutual consent in April 2002.

== After football ==
After his professional football career, Van Eijkeren began working as a gym teacher at Trias VMBO in Krommenie. He since became dean and mentor at Zaanlands Lyceum. He also coached amateur club Hercules Zaandam between 2014 and 2018 in the Derde Klasse.
