= Jan Willem van Ede =

Dutch footballer (born 1963)

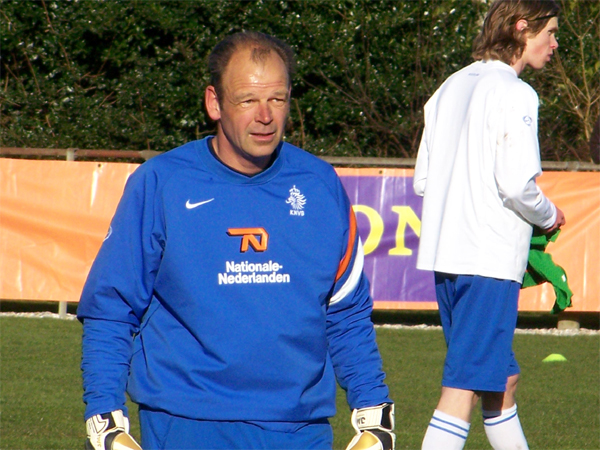
- Jan Willem van Ede

Personal information
- Date of birth: 13 April 1963 (age 63)
- Place of birth: Utrecht, Netherlands
- Position: Goalkeeper

Youth career
- UVV

Senior career*
Years	Team	Apps	(Gls)
1982–1996	FC Utrecht	409	(0)
1996–1998	PSV	6	(0)
1998–1999	Haarlem	10	(0)
1999–2000	NAC	25	(0)
2000–2002	FC Twente	1	(0)
Total		451	(0)

International career
1983	Netherlands U21	2	(0)
1983-1988	Netherlands U23	4	(0)
- * Club domestic league appearances and goals as of 4 December 2008

Jan Willem van Ede (born 13 April 1963 in Utrecht) is a Dutch retired football goalkeeper.

== Playing career ==
=== Club ===
He played the majority of his career for hometown club FC Utrecht and as of 2026, still holds the record of most Eredivisie games played for the club with 409. He made his professional debut on 8 September 1982 for Utrecht against PEC Zwolle and won the 1985 KNVB Cup with the club.

He later became reserve goalkeeper at PSV and FC Twente and also played for Haarlem in the Eerste Divisie and NAC.

=== International ===
Van Ede was capped twice by the Netherlands national under-21 football team.

=== Hoekman case ===
In 1999, Van Ede was sentenced to pay a compensation after kicking Roda JC winger Danny Hoekman 10 years earlier, which took Hoekman out of the game for almost two years due to a knee injury.

== Coaching career ==
Van Ede worked as assistant and goalkeeper coach of the Netherlands women from 2005 but was dismissed in summer 2016 due to a difference in view with manager Arjan van der Laan. Next to his job with the Dutch FA, he was appointed coach of amateur side Montfoort in December 2015.

In September 2019 van Ede was appointed the Republic of Ireland Women's team goalkeeping coach, reuniting with manager Vera Pauw.

== Statistics ==
Season	Club	Country	League	Apps	Goals
1982/83	FC Utrecht	Netherlands	Eredivisie	30	0
1983/84	FC Utrecht	Netherlands	Eredivisie	34	0
1984/85	FC Utrecht	Netherlands	Eredivisie	34	0
1985/86	FC Utrecht	Netherlands	Eredivisie	15	0
1986/87	FC Utrecht	Netherlands	Eredivisie	14	0
1987/88	FC Utrecht	Netherlands	Eredivisie	34	0
1988/89	FC Utrecht	Netherlands	Eredivisie	19	0
1989/90	FC Utrecht	Netherlands	Eredivisie	34	0
1990/91	FC Utrecht	Netherlands	Eredivisie	34	0
1991/92	FC Utrecht	Netherlands	Eredivisie	34	0
1992/93	FC Utrecht	Netherlands	Eredivisie	34	0
1993/94	FC Utrecht	Netherlands	Eredivisie	34	0
1994/95	FC Utrecht	Netherlands	Eredivisie	30	0
1995/96	FC Utrecht	Netherlands	Eredivisie	29	0
1996/97	PSV	Netherlands	Eredivisie	5	0
1997/98	PSV	Netherlands	Eredivisie	1	0
1998/99	HFC Haarlem	Netherlands	Eerste Divisie	10	0
1999/00	NAC	Netherlands	Eerste Divisie	25	0
2000/2001	FC Twente	Netherlands	Eredivisie	1	0
2001/02	FC Twente	Netherlands	Eredivisie	0	0
Total				451	0

Last update: 4 December 2008

== Honours ==
FC Utrecht

- KNVB Cup: 1984–85
