= Chris van der Weerden =

Dutch footballer and manager

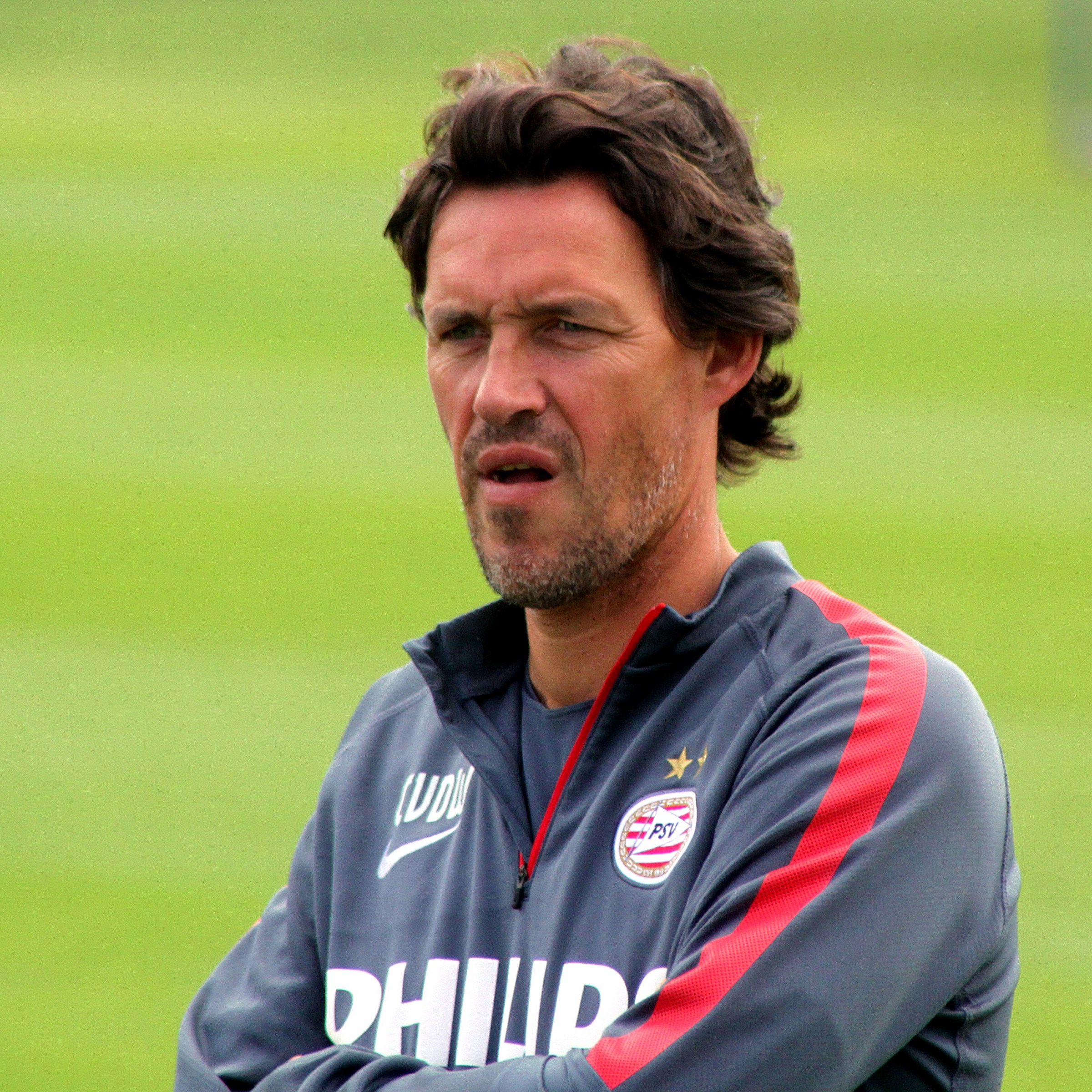
- Van der Weerden in 2014

Personal information
- Full name: Christian Hermanus Cornelis van der Weerden
- Date of birth: 15 November 1972 (age 53)
- Place of birth: Nijmegen, Netherlands
- Height: 1.78 m (5 ft 10 in)
- Position: Right-back

Team information
- Current team: Shakhtar Donetsk (assistant)

Youth career
- SCH
- NEC

Senior career*
Years	Team	Apps	(Gls)
1990–1994	NEC	92	(5)
1994–1995	Vitesse	31	(3)
1995–2001	PSV	108	(5)
2001–2004	Twente	66	(2)
2004–2006	Germinal Beerschot	23	(2)
2006–2008	FC Eindhoven	43	(1)
Total		363	(18)

Managerial career
- 2012–2018: PSV (assistant)
- 2018: Fenerbahçe (assistant)
- 2019–2020: Derby County (assistant)
- 2022–2023: Vitesse (assistant)
- 2023–: Shakhtar Donetsk (assistant)
- * Club domestic league appearances and goals

Christian Hermanus Cornelis van der Weerden (born 15 November 1972) is a Dutch football assistant manager and former player. He is currently working for Shakhtar Donetsk as assistant manager to Marino Pušić.

== Career ==
Van der Weerden played professional football for NEC, Vitesse, PSV, FC Twente, Germinal Beerschot, and FC Eindhoven.
