= Anders Nielsen (footballer, born 1972) =

Danish footballer and coach

Personal information
- Date of birth: November 23, 1972 (age 53)
- Place of birth: Kalundborg, Denmark
- Positions: Right winger; right midfielder

Team information
- Current team: Kalundborg GB (youth)

Youth career
- 1977–1987: Raklev GI
- 1987–1989: Holbæk B&I
- 1989–1990: Lyngby

Senior career*
Years	Team	Apps	(Gls)
1990–1996	Lyngby	159	(15)
1996–1998	PSV Eindhoven	3	(0)
1997–1998	RKC Waalwijk (loan)	33	(11)
1998–2002	Sparta Rotterdam	93	(16)
2002–2002	AS Varese	6	(1)
2003–200?	Kalundborg GB		
2004–2006	Holbæk B&I	27	(1)
2006–2010	Svebølle B&I		

International career
1987–1987	Denmark u-16	2	(0)
1991–1992	Denmark u-19	4	(0)

Managerial career
- 2006–2010: Svebølle B&I
- 2010–: Kalundborg GB (youth)
- * Club domestic league appearances and goals

Anders Nielsen (born November 23, 1972) is a Danish football coach and former player. He works as youth coach at Kalundborg GB. He is the former manager of Denmark Series team Svebølle B&I.

== Club career ==
Nielsen was born in Kalundborg, Denmark. He started his career playing 130 Danish Superliga games for Lyngby Boldklub from 1991 to 1996, winning the 1991–92 Danish Superliga. He moved abroad in 1996 to play for PSV Eindhoven, RKC Waalwijk, and Sparta Rotterdam in the Netherlands, as well as Italian club AS Varese.

He moved back to Denmark in 2003, to play for lower-league clubs Kalundborg GB and Holbæk B&I. In 2006, he was named player-manager of Svebølle B&I. In 2010, he left the club after failing to secure the promotion to the Danish 2nd Divisions. He then became youth coach at Kalundborg GB.

== International career ==
He played four games for the Denmark national under-19 football team from 1991 to 1992.
