= Arthur Numan =

Dutch footballer (born 1969)

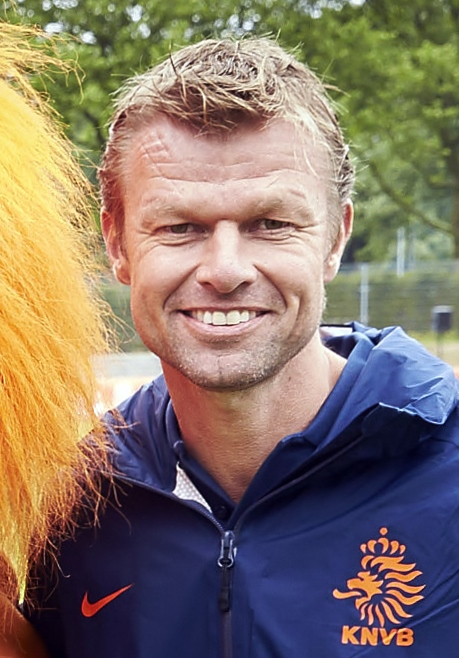
- Numan in 2013

Personal information
- Full name: Arthur Johannes Numan
- Date of birth: 14 December 1969 (age 56)
- Place of birth: Heemskerk, North Holland, Netherlands
- Height: 1.82 m (6 ft 0 in)
- Position: Full back

Youth career
- SV Beverwijk

Senior career*
Years	Team	Apps	(Gls)
1987–1991	Haarlem	91	(5)
1991–1992	Twente	49	(7)
1992–1998	PSV Eindhoven	204	(28)
1998–2003	Rangers	147	(6)
Total		436	(40)

International career
1992–2002	Netherlands	53	(2)

Managerial career
- 2008: Netherlands B (team manager)
Medal record
Men's football
Representing Netherlands
UEFA European Championship
Bronze medal – third place	2000
- * Club domestic league appearances and goals

Arthur Johannes Numan (born 14 December 1969) is a Dutch former professional footballer. He played as a left back.

== Club career ==
=== Early career ===
Born in Heemskerk, North Holland, Numan started his career with the amateur club SV Beverwijk and was spotted by Haarlem, who handed him his first professional game against DS '79 on 26 March 1988 which his team won 2–0. He originally played in a more attacking role, but his long-time mentor Dick Advocaat, then the coach of Haarlem, positioned him as a left fullback.

=== Twente and PSV ===
Numan joined Twente at the close of the 1990–91 season where he scored goals even as a defender. He was named team captain for the Enschede team and also captained the Dutch Under 21 national team. However, it was not until he joined PSV Eindhoven that his talents were fully appreciated. He was drafted into the Dutch team for a World Cup qualifying game against Poland which ended in a 2–2 draw on 14 October 1992. Numan was substituted after forty minutes by Advocaat, who was then the national team coach and brought on PSV teammate Gerald Vanenburg as his team was 2–0 down early in the game.

=== Rangers ===
A £4.5 million deal took him to Rangers in May 1998, but Numan's time in Scotland was then blighted by injuries that forced him to sit out many games. Dick Advocaat, who managed the team at that time, waited for Numan to recover, a move which was rewarded when he helped the team to considerable league success as well as the treble in his first and final season at Rangers. Numan was awarded the teams vice-captaincy serving as deputy to captain Lorenzo Amoruso. He had a particularly prolific relationship with German international left sided midfielder Jorg Albertz. However, at the end of the 2002–03 season, he and the club could not agree a new contract so he left at the end of that season. He stated that he was willing to accept a pay-cut offer but felt that his club wanted too large a drop in wages. He soon announced his retirement. A late offer by Villarreal failed to change his mind and he refused to continue his career in Holland. He was not looking forward to start afresh training and playing hectic games every week.

== International career ==
Numan was included in the squad for the 1994 World Cup in the United States, although he was never included in the starting line-up for any of the matches. His World Cup debut came against Ireland as a substitute in the 75th minute. He was also selected for Euro 1996, yet also failed to start a match at the tournament.

Numan was chosen to captain the team. He featured in most of the qualification games for the 1998 World Cup. Numan played in all of the group matches in France, although the quarter final game against Argentina was marred with his second yellow card of the game (after a tackle on Diego Simeone). He missed the crucial clash with eventual finalist Brazil. He played in the third placing match against Croatia, but could not help his team win the bronze medal.

Numan continued to feature in the Dutch national team, representing his country on home soil during the Euro 2000 tournament. By 2000, Numan's career at the international stage appeared to wane and his automatic left back spot was open to his contenders Winston Bogarde and Giovanni van Bronckhorst. He was to play for the remaining games of his team's failed attempt to capture their first major trophy since 1988 culminating in the semi-final loss to Italy on penalties.

He was determined to assist his national team to qualify for the 2002 World Cup in South Korea and Japan under manager Louis van Gaal but the crucial game against Ireland at Landsdowne Road stadium in late 2001 was lost 1–0. He retired from international football after his final international game against United States on 19 May 2002, which the Dutch won 2–0 away.

== Managing career ==
Numan was a regular pundit on Scotsport SPL, Scottish and Grampian TV's round-up of Scottish Premier League action and remained in Hamilton for a few years after his retirement. He was also appointed treasurer of the Rangers Charity Trust.

He has taken up the position of team manager for the Netherlands B squad in December 2008.

Numan signed a one-year contract with Aston Villa to become their scout in the Netherlands and surrounding areas in mid-2011.

Currently, he works as a scout for Eredivisie side AZ on a part-time basis.

== Honours ==
PSV Eindhoven

- Eredivisie: 1997
- KNVB Cup: 1996
- Johan Cruijff Shield: 1992, 1996, 1997, 1998

Rangers

- Scottish Premier League: 1999, 2000, 2003
- Scottish Cup: 1999, 2000, 2002, 2003
- Scottish League Cup: 1999, 2002, 2003
