= Björn van der Doelen =

Dutch footballer (born 1976)

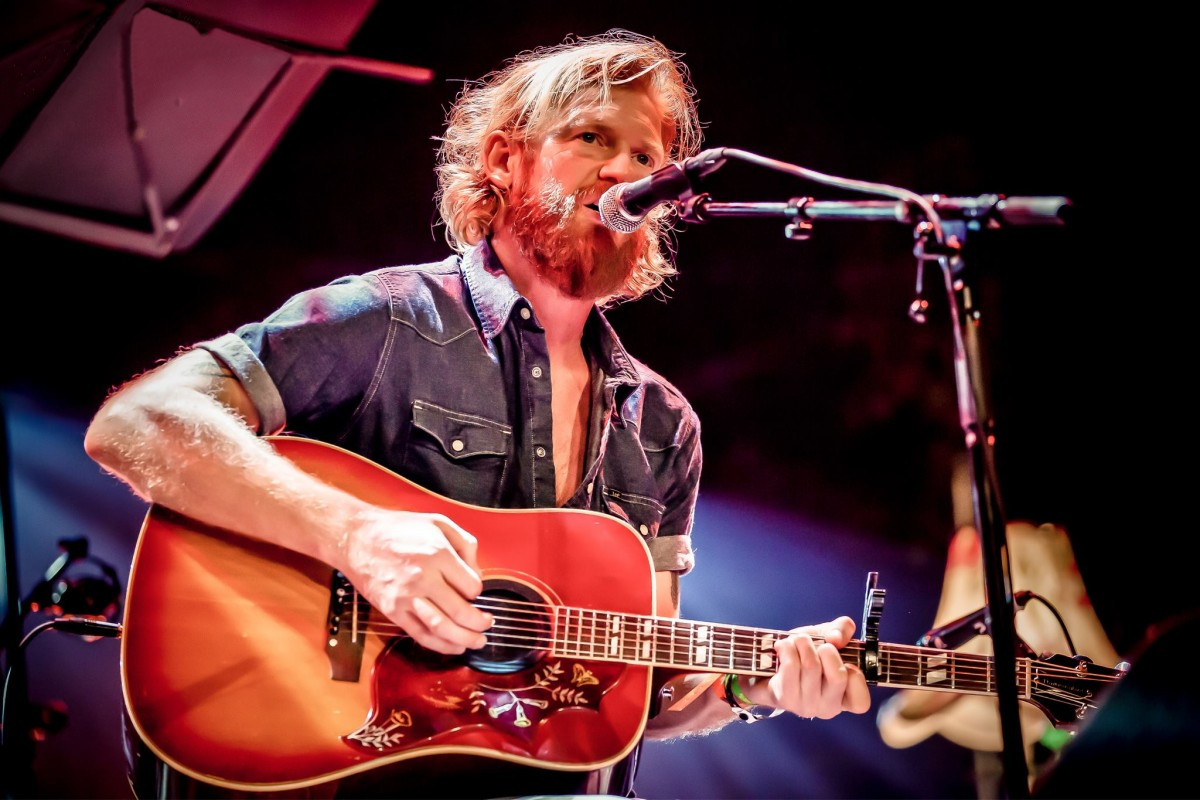
- Van der Doelen performing in 2015

Personal information
- Full name: Wouterus Jacobus; Antonius van der Doelen
- Date of birth: 24 August 1976 (age 50)
- Place of birth: Goirle, Netherlands
- Height: 1.80 m (5 ft 11 in)
- Position: Midfielder

Senior career*
Years	Team	Apps	(Gls)
1994–2001	PSV	95	(5)
1997–1998	→ Standard Liège (loan)	30	(2)
2001–2004	Twente	47	(2)
2004	→ NEC (loan)	21	(3)
2004–2006	NEC	56	(1)
Total		249	(13)

International career
1992–1993	Netherlands U17	8	(0)
1993	Netherlands U18	3	(0)
1994–1995	Netherlands U19	8	(1)
1996–1997	Netherlands U21	10	(1)
- * Club domestic league appearances and goals

Wouterus Jacobus Antonius "Björn" van der Doelen (born 24 August 1976) is a Dutch retired footballer who played as a midfielder.

== Club career ==
Van der Doelen was born in Goirle, Netherlands. He started his professional career for PSV Eindhoven in the 1994–95 season in the Dutch highest league, Eredivisie. Later on, Van der Doelen played for Standard Liège (Belgium), FC Twente and NEC

== International career ==
He was a member of the Dutch squad at the 1995 FIFA World Youth Championship.

== Music career ==
In recent years, Van der Doelen started a career as singer/songwriter, first in the band Allez Soldaat, with band members Maarten van der Zanden (guitar), Steffen Pauws (bass) and Jules Fransen (drums). Later, using his own name. He has been performing with his band Huursoldaten since 2017.

He also made a song about the city Nijmegen, as a declaration of love for the city and for the club he loved most to play football for.
