= 1996–97 Eredivisie =

41st season of the Eredivisie

Eredivisie
- Season: 1996–97
- Dates: 20 August 1996 – 1 June 1997
- Champions: PSV (14th title)
- Relegated: AZ
- Champions League: PSV; Feyenoord
- Cup Winners' Cup: Roda JC
- UEFA Cup: FC Twente; Ajax; Vitesse Arnhem
- Intertoto Cup: sc Heerenveen; FC Groningen
- Goals: 864
- Average goals/game: 2.82
- Top goalscorer: (Belgium) Luc Nilis (21 goals)

The Dutch Eredivisie in the 1996–97 season was contested by 18 teams. PSV won the championship.

== League standings ==
Pos	Team	Pld	W	D	L	GF	GA	GD	Pts	Qualification or relegation
1	PSV (C)	34	24	5	5	90	26	+64	77	Qualification to Champions League group stage
2	Feyenoord	34	22	7	5	67	34	+33	73	Qualification to Champions League second qualifying round
3	FC Twente	34	20	5	9	60	33	+27	65	Qualification to UEFA Cup first round
4	Ajax	34	17	10	7	55	31	+24	61	Qualification to UEFA Cup first round
5	Vitesse	34	15	10	9	53	41	+12	55	Qualification to UEFA Cup first round
6	Roda JC	34	16	7	11	56	47	+9	55	Qualification to Cup Winners' Cup first round
7	SC Heerenveen	34	13	11	10	58	47	+11	50	Qualification to Intertoto Cup group stage
8	De Graafschap	34	13	6	15	52	55	−3	45	
9	NAC	34	10	10	14	41	54	−13	40	
10	FC Groningen	34	9	12	13	43	56	−13	39	Qualification to Intertoto Cup group stage
11	Fortuna Sittard	34	9	12	13	36	52	−16	39	
12	FC Utrecht	34	8	14	12	42	52	−10	38	
13	Sparta	34	11	5	18	40	56	−16	38	
14	FC Volendam	34	9	11	14	36	55	−19	38	
15	Willem II	34	9	8	17	34	51	−17	35	
16	RKC Waalwijk	34	9	7	18	39	61	−22	34	Qualification to Relegation play-offs
17	NEC	34	7	11	16	35	61	−26	32	Qualification to Relegation play-offs
18	AZ (R)	34	6	7	21	27	52	−25	25	Relegation to Eerste Divisie

(C) Champions; (R) Relegated

== Results ==
Home \ Away	AJA	AZ	FEY	FOR	GRA	GRO	HEE	NAC	NEC	PSV	RKC	RJC	SPA	TWE	UTR	VIT	VOL	WIL
Ajax		1–0	3–0	2–2	1–1	1–1	2–1	1–0	5–0	0–2	2–0	3–1	2–0	3–2	1–0	4–0	1–1	3–0
AZ	1–1		0–2	0–1	2–3	1–4	0–2	0–1	2–2	0–2	2–1	1–3	1–2	1–2	3–1	0–2	2–1	1–0
Feyenoord	2–2	1–0		4–4	2–1	3–1	4–2	1–0	2–0	0–0	5–0	1–0	6–1	1–1	2–1	0–0	3–0	4–1
Fortuna Sittard	2–1	1–0	0–2		0–3	0–2	2–4	2–2	3–1	1–1	0–0	0–3	2–1	1–1	1–3	1–5	1–1	2–0
De Graafschap	0–2	1–1	0–4	2–0		2–0	2–1	2–2	4–0	2–1	3–2	5–2	0–2	1–2	1–2	2–1	1–0	2–2
Groningen	1–1	1–0	0–1	2–0	2–4		1–5	2–2	2–4	0–1	1–2	1–1	1–2	2–1	2–2	3–2	1–1	0–0
Heerenveen	2–0	0–0	1–0	2–2	2–1	1–3		0–1	1–1	0–1	2–0	3–1	0–0	1–3	2–2	3–0	1–2	3–1
NAC	2–0	1–0	0–2	1–1	2–1	1–1	2–2		1–1	2–2	0–2	0–1	1–0	1–2	3–3	1–1	3–0	0–1
NEC	2–0	0–0	1–2	1–1	2–1	0–0	1–1	0–3		1–4	3–1	2–1	3–2	0–3	2–2	0–1	3–0	0–0
PSV	2–0	2–1	7–2	1–0	5–0	4–1	0–1	5–0	4–1		4–0	8–0	2–1	2–0	6–1	0–0	6–0	3–1
RKC	1–2	5–0	1–1	1–1	0–3	1–1	0–3	1–2	3–1	1–4		0–2	2–0	3–2	1–0	0–1	0–0	1–2
Roda	0–0	0–2	1–1	0–1	3–0	2–0	6–1	2–1	2–0	3–1	4–0		4–1	1–3	1–1	1–1	3–0	2–1
Sparta Rotterdam	2–1	1–2	0–1	0–0	1–1	0–2	0–3	2–4	1–0	1–3	1–3	4–0		1–2	3–2	1–2	0–3	3–1
Twente	1–1	1–0	0–1	2–1	1–0	0–1	2–1	4–0	3–0	1–2	3–0	1–1	0–2		2–0	1–0	4–0	5–0
Utrecht	1–1	2–0	2–1	0–1	2–0	0–0	2–2	3–1	1–1	2–2	2–2	1–1	0–1	0–0		1–0	1–0	0–0
Vitesse	1–4	1–0	4–2	2–1	3–2	6–1	1–1	3–0	1–1	1–0	2–2	1–2	1–1	4–2	1–0		1–1	2–0
Volendam	0–3	2–2	0–2	2–0	1–1	2–2	2–2	4–1	1–0	1–3	1–0	2–1	0–2	0–1	5–2	1–1		2–1
Willem II	0–1	2–2	0–2	0–1	2–0	3–1	2–2	2–0	3–1	1–0	1–3	0–1	1–1	1–2	3–0	2–1	0–0	

Legend: Blue = home team win; Yellow = draw; Red = away team win.

== Promotion/relegation play-offs ==
Group A
Pos	Team	Pld	W	D	L	GF	GA	GD	Pts	Qualification
1	RKC Waalwijk	6	5	0	1	19	6	+13	15	Remain in Eredivisie
2	FC Zwolle	6	3	1	2	6	9	−3	10	Remain in Eerste Divisie
3	Emmen	6	2	1	3	8	10	−2	7	Remain in Eerste Divisie
4	ADO Den Haag	6	0	2	4	3	11	−8	2	Remain in Eerste Divisie

Group B
Pos	Team	Pld	W	D	L	GF	GA	GD	Pts	Qualification
1	NEC	6	5	0	1	19	5	+14	15	Remain in Eredivisie
2	Go Ahead Eagles	6	5	0	1	17	8	+9	15	Remain in Eerste Divisie
3	Cambuur Leeuwarden	6	2	0	4	8	15	−7	6	Remain in Eerste Divisie
4	VVV	6	0	0	6	6	22	−16	0	Remain in Eerste Divisie

== Attendances ==
No.	Club	Average	Change	Highest
1	AFC Ajax	45,141	101,6%	50,580
2	PSV	28,094	9,2%	30,000
3	Feyenoord	26,881	0,9%	45,200
4	sc Heerenveen	13,235	0,2%	13,600
5	FC Groningen	12,562	4,7%	16,200
6	NAC Breda	12,383	28,4%	16,204
7	FC Utrecht	10,353	36,8%	14,000
8	De Graafschap	8,396	18,0%	10,900
9	Willem II	8,376	-1,8%	13,500
10	FC Twente	7,625	10,8%	10,500
11	AZ	7,440	39,1%	11,250
12	Roda JC	7,388	-9,9%	12,000
13	SBV Vitesse	7,157	3,5%	10,349
14	Fortuna Sittard	5,129	-21,2%	9,500
15	Sparta Rotterdam	4,729	7,3%	13,500
16	NEC	4,642	-10,5%	12,830
17	RKC Waalwijk	4,267	18,7%	7,500
18	FC Volendam	4,014	-2,2%	7,100

== See also ==
- 1996–97 Eerste Divisie
- 1996–97 KNVB Cup
