= 2000–01 in Dutch football =

The 2000/2001 season in Dutch football was the 45th season in the Eredivisie, where PSV Eindhoven claimed the title, while FC Twente won the Dutch National Cup.

== Johan Cruijff-schaal ==
August 13, 2000

PSV	2–0	Roda JC
Ramzi 29'; Faber 44'

Amsterdam Arena, Amsterdam
Attendance: 28,000
Referee: Bossen

== Eredivisie ==
Position	Team	Points	Played	Won	Drawn	Lost	For	Against	Difference
1	PSV	83	34	25	8	1	73	23	+50
2	Feyenoord	66	34	21	3	10	67	37	+30
3	Ajax	61	34	18	7	9	85	43	+42
4	Roda JC	59	34	17	8	9	59	41	+18
5	Utrecht	59	34	17	8	9	58	43	+16
6	Vitesse	59	34	16	11	7	56	43	+13
7	RKC Waalwijk	59	34	16	11	7	48	36	+12
8	Willem II	51	34	14	9	11	60	50	+10
9	NAC Breda	49	34	13	10	11	41	40	+1
10	Heerenveen	47	34	11	14	9	51	42	+9
11	Twente	41	34	10	11	13	47	60	-13
12	NEC	40	34	9	13	12	42	53	-11
13	AZ	35	34	9	8	17	45	63	-18
14	Groningen	33	34	8	9	17	36	56	-20
15	De Graafschap	31	34	9	4	21	44	66	-22
16	Fortuna Sittard	31	34	8	7	19	31	64	-33
17	Sparta Rotterdam	25	34	6	7	21	42	72	-30
18	RBC Roosendaal	14	34	4	2	28	37	90	-53

- Champions League : PSV
- Champions League qualification : Feyenoord
- UEFA Cup : Ajax, Roda JC, Utrecht and Twente
- Promotion / relegation play-offs ("Nacompetitie") : Fortuna Sittard and Sparta Rotterdam
- Relegated : RBC Roosendaal

=== Top scorers ===
Position	Player	Nationality	Club	Goals
1	Mateja Kežman	(Federal Republic of Yugoslavia)	PSV	24
2	Ali El Khattabi	(Morocco)	Sparta Rotterdam	21
3	Yannis Anastasiou	(Greece)	Roda JC	19
–	Igor Gluščević	(Federal Republic of Yugoslavia)	Utrecht	19
5	Shota Arveladze	(Georgia (country))	Ajax	18
6	Rick Hoogendorp	(Netherlands)	RKC Waalwijk	17

=== Awards ===
==== Dutch Footballer of the Year ====
- 2000–01 — Mark van Bommel (PSV)

==== Dutch Golden Shoe Winner ====
- 2000 — Jerzy Dudek (Feyenoord)
- 2001 — Johann Vogel (PSV)

=== PSV winning squad 2000–01 ===
Goal

- (Netherlands) Gino Coutinho
- (Federal Republic of Yugoslavia) Ivica Kralj
- (Netherlands) Patrick Lodewijks
- (Netherlands) Ronald Waterreus

Defence

- (Ghana) Eric Addo
- (Denmark) Kasper Bøgelund
- (Netherlands) Wilfred Bouma
- (Netherlands) Jürgen Dirkx
- (Netherlands) Ernest Faber
- (Netherlands) Kevin Hofland
- (Russia) Yuri Nikiforov
- (Netherlands) André Ooijer
- (Netherlands) Nuelson Wau
- (Netherlands) Chris van der Weerden

Midfield

- (Netherlands) Mark van Bommel
- (Netherlands) Björn van der Doelen
- (Netherlands) Robert Fuchs
- (Georgia (country)) Giorgi Gakhokidze
- (Netherlands) John de Jong
- (Finland) Joonas Kolkka
- (Netherlands) Theo Lucius
- (Brazil) Marquinho
- (Morocco) Adil Ramzi
- (Denmark) Dennis Rommedahl
- (Romania) Ovidiu Stinga
- (Switzerland) Johann Vogel

Attack

- (Netherlands) Arnold Bruggink
- (Brazil) Claudio
- (Federal Republic of Yugoslavia) Mateja Kežman
- (Netherlands) Ruud van Nistelrooy

Management

- (Belgium) Eric Gerets (Coach)
- (Netherlands) Ernie Brandts (Assistant)

== Eerste Divisie ==
Position	Team	Points	Played	Won	Drawn	Lost	For	Against	Difference
1	FC Den Bosch	75	34	23	6	5	64	25	+39
2	Excelsior	66	34	20	6	8	89	63	+26
3	Zwolle	64	34	18	10	6	73	41	+32
4	Cambuur	54	34	15	9	10	55	52	+3
5	Volendam	53	34	16	5	13	58	48	+10
6	Go Ahead Eagles	53	34	16	5	13	62	63	-1
7	Telstar	53	34	15	8	11	47	48	-1
8	Helmond Sport	48	34	13	9	12	69	50	+19
9	FC Eindhoven	45	34	12	9	13	58	57	-1
10	TOP Oss	45	34	14	3	17	59	67	-8
11	Emmen	41	34	11	8	15	53	64	-11
12	Dordrecht '90	40	34	10	10	14	58	59	-1
13	MVV Maastricht	40	34	12	4	18	47	58	-11
14	Veendam	39	34	11	6	17	54	69	-15
15	Heracles Almelo	39	34	10	9	15	38	56	-18
16	ADO Den Haag	36	34	9	9	16	51	71	-20
17	HFC Haarlem	34	34	8	10	16	46	64	-18
18	VVV-Venlo	28	34	8	4	22	37	63	-26

- Promoted : FC Den Bosch
- Promotion / Relegation play-offs ("Nacompetitie") : Excelsior, Zwolle, Cambuur, Volendam, Go Ahead Eagles and SC Telstar

=== Topscorers ===
Position	Player	Nationality	Club	Goals
1	Stefan Jansen	(Netherlands)	TOP Oss	30
2	Bart Van Den Eede	(Belgium)	FC Den Bosch	23
3	Marco Boogers	(Netherlands)	Dordrecht '90	19
–	Raoul Henar	(Netherlands)	Helmond Sport	19
5	Ivan Cvetkov	(Bulgaria)	Veendam	18
6	Jaromír Šimr	(Czech Republic)	Excelsior	17
7	Ali Boussaboun	(Morocco)	ADO Den Haag	15
–	Sherjill MacDonald	(Netherlands)	FC Eindhoven	15
–	Hans van Arum	(Netherlands)	Go Ahead Eagles	15
–	Michel van Oostrum	(Netherlands)	Telstar / Emmen	15

== Promotion and relegation ==
=== Group A ===
Position	Team	Points	Played	Won	Drawn	Lost	For	Against	Difference
1	Fortuna Sittard	10	6	3	2	2	9	6	+3
2	Zwolle	9	6	2	3	1	6	4	+2
3	Volendam	9	6	3	0	3	6	8	-2
4	Telstar	5	6	1	2	3	7	10	-3

=== Group B ===
Position	Team	Points	Played	Won	Drawn	Lost	For	Against	Difference
1	Sparta Rotterdam	13	6	4	1	1	14	8	+6
2	Cambuur	9	6	3	0	3	11	13	-2
3	Excelsior	7	6	2	1	3	14	14	0
4	Go Ahead Eagles	5	6	1	2	3	9	13	-4

- Stayed : Fortuna Sittard and Sparta Rotterdam

== KNVB Cup ==
Quarter-finals
February 7
Vitesse	2
AZ	1
February 7
Zwolle	3
Twente	4
February 7
Roda JC	0
PSV	2
March 14
Heerenveen	4
Feyenoord	3

Semi-finals
April 12
Vitesse	0 (3)
Twente	0 (4)
April 11
Heerenveen	1
PSV	3

Final
May 24 – Rotterdam
Twente	0 (4)
PSV	0 (3)
