= Zeljko Kalac =

Australian soccer player (born 1972)

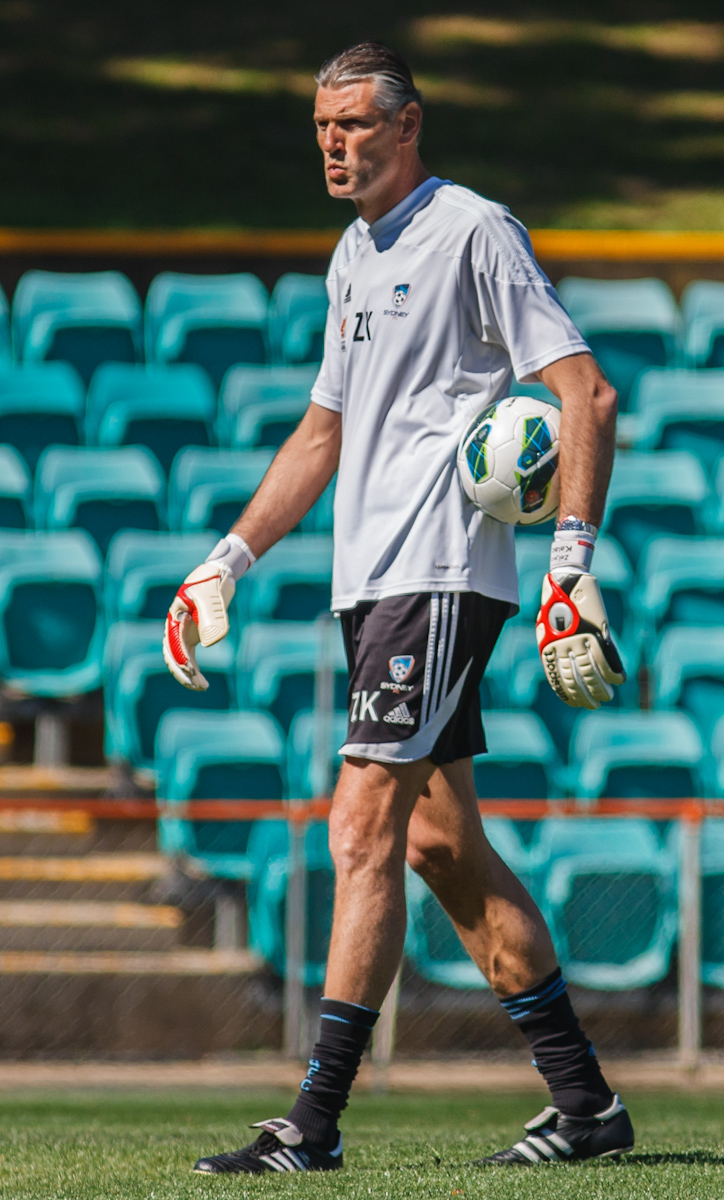
- Kalac in 2012

Personal information
- Full name: Zeljko Kalac
- Date of birth: 16 December 1972 (age 53)
- Place of birth: Sydney, New South Wales, Australia
- Height: 2.02 m (6 ft 8 in)
- Position: Goalkeeper

Team information
- Current team: Iraq (goalkeeping coach)

Youth career
- 1988: Sydney United

Senior career*
| Years | Team | Apps | (Gls) |
| 1989–1995 | Sydney United | 92 | (0) |
| 1995–1996 | Leicester City | 2 | (0) |
| 1996–1998 | Sydney United | 30 | (0) |
| 1998–2002 | Roda JC | 115 | (0) |
| 2002–2005 | Perugia | 79 | (0) |
| 2005–2009 | AC Milan | 38 | (0) |
| 2009–2010 | Kavala | 9 | (0) |
| 2010–2011 | Sydney United | | |
| 2013 | Hobart Zebras | 1 | (0) |
| Total | | 366 | (0) |

International career
| 1992–2006 | Australia | 54 | (0) |

Managerial career
- 2020: Sydney United
- 2021–2023: NK Urania
- 2023: Bulls FC Academy
- 2024: Sydney United
- 2025–: Iraq (goalkeeping)
Medal record
Representing Australia
Men's Association football
FIFA Confederations Cup
| Runner-up | 1997 Saudi Arabia |
OFC Nations Cup
| Winner | 1996 Oceania |
| Winner | 2000 Tahiti |
| Winner | 2004 Australia |
- * Club domestic league appearances and goals

Zeljko Kalac (born 16 December 1972) is an Australian soccer coach and former player who is currently the goalkeeping coach for the Iraq national team. Standing at 2.02 m, Kalac is the tallest player to have represented the Australia national team.

Kalac's 24-year playing career included spells for football clubs in England, the Netherlands, Italy and Greece. Although he was a goalkeeper, Kalac's preferred playing number (when not the conventional number 1) is 18 and has generally worn this number when playing for Australia.

== Club career ==
=== Early career ===
Growing up in the Sydney Croat community, Kalac began his professional career rising through the ranks at Sydney United, competing in the Australian National Soccer League. At the age of sixteen, he was included in the first team alongside first-choice keeper Tony Franken, playing the first eleven games of the 1989–90 NSL season in Franken's absence, before returning to the substitute bench – a place occupied throughout the 1990–91 season as a stand-out Franken remained fit and was first choice all season.

In the off-season, Franken transferred to local rivals APIA Leichhardt, but Kalac was now competing for a place with a young Mark Bosnich (a former rival at Marconi Fairfield), who had returned from an unsuccessful spell at Manchester United. Kalac would start 21 out of 26 games in the 1991–92 season, the place cemented when Bosnich transferred to Aston Villa later in the season.

When APIA Leichhardt were dumped out of the NSL for financial troubles at the end of the 1991–92 season, Franken returned to Sydney United to resume keeping duties, however selections were not as clear cut as before. Appearances were shared throughout the 1992–93 season and Kalac became first choice throughout the 1993–94 season, helping Sydney United to third place in the table before being eliminated in the semi-finals. He remained as first-choice throughout the 1994–95 season, again reaching the semi-final stage of the competition.

=== Move to England ===
In 1995, Kalac followed many Australian players in a move to Europe with English Division One side Leicester City. Here he only made three first team appearances, one each in the league and League Cup, and his final appearance as a substitute in the 1996 Football League First Division play-off final against Crystal Palace, with the score 1–1. He came on in the final minute of extra-time as Leicester manager Martin O'Neill believed that due to Kalac's size, he would be able to save penalties during the shootout. But Steve Claridge scored at the other end with the last kick of the game, 20 seconds after Kalac had come onto the pitch, and the Foxes were promoted to the Premiership without needing a shootout.

With Kevin Poole remaining as first choice keeper, a transfer deal was agreed for Kalac to go to Wolverhampton Wanderers, along with fellow Australian Steve Corica for £1.75 million. But after making the move to Wolves he was unable to attain a UK work permit, and amid a long appeal process, the deal fell through and he returned to Sydney United.

The next season in the NSL, he played every match for United helping them to the most successful season in over a decade, comfortably winning the league before being beaten in the grand final.

A move to England was again on the cards in 1997 at Portsmouth. Terry Venables, who was also coaching the Australian national side at the time, sought to sign Kalac but he was again denied a work permit and the deal fell through.

=== Roda ===
In 1998, he signed with Eredivisie side Roda JC who were seeking to fill the gap left by Ruud Hesp's departure a year earlier. Starting as the club's number one, he held this position for four years.

After narrowly avoiding relegation in 1997–98, Kalac's arrival helped the side rise to fifth in 1998–99 season, earning a UEFA Cup berth. The 1999–2000 season was less successful in the league (finishing eighth) but he helped Roda lift the 2000 KNVB Cup, which Kalac rates as one of his greatest career achievements. A promising 2000–01 season (finishing fourth) earned a UEFA Cup place the following year that would be a memorable campaign. Roda progressed as far as the fourth round, pressing A.C. Milan to penalties. After a number of saves throughout regular time, Kalac saved two penalties in the shootout from José Mari and Kakha Kaladze, but it was not enough as Milan went through 3–2.

=== Perugia ===
In July 2002, he was signed by Serie A club A.C. Perugia, quickly cementing his place as first choice, helping them to a place in the Intertoto Cup. The Italian side went on to win their cup final, Kalac not conceding once in the competition. The domestic season ended in relegation after finishing fourth last and losing a playoff against Fiorentina.

Kalac stayed with Perugia in Serie B in 2004–05 and played 29 times as Perugia finished third, but were demoted to Serie C1 for financial troubles.

=== Milan ===
With Perugia relegated again, Kalac joined AC Milan in the summer of 2005 on a free transfer. It was not until February 2006 that he made his debut in a Milan shirt, when an ankle injury suffered by incumbent Dida forced a substitution in the first leg of the Champions League knockout stage against Bayern Munich. As a result, he played his first Serie A match since 2004, keeping clean sheets against Palermo and Empoli He also played in the Coppa Italia until Milan were eliminated by underdog Palermo on a disappointing 3–1 aggregate.

On 21 November 2006, Kalac made his second UEFA Champions League appearance for Milan as he came off the bench in the final 15 minutes of the group match against AEK Athens. Dida tore knee ligaments and was predicted to be out for two to three months, which finally gave Kalac a chance to make more competitive appearances for Milan. Kalac's first full game in the 2006–07 season was on 25 November 2006 in Milan's 1–0 win over Messina in the Serie A.

On 14 January 2007, Kalac suffered an injury against Reggina and was replaced by a recovering Dida for the following match against Lazio. These goalkeeper injury concerns prompted manager Carlo Ancelotti to sign Messina goalkeeper Marco Storari, who became the third goalkeeper in the Milan first team with veteran Valerio Fiori being the fourth. Storari replaced Dida and Kalac in Milan's Serie A matches against Livorno and Siena in mid-February, when both were out with injuries. Despite this extra competition, Kalac recovered from injury in time to play for Milan in the first leg of the UEFA Champions League round of 16 against Celtic on 20 February. In the next Serie A match against Sampdoria five days later, Dida was nevertheless able to make his comeback after being out for nearly one month and subsequently remained in goal until suffering a shoulder injury in mid-April, which enabled Kalac to make further two Serie A appearances before Dida returned in goal for the first leg of the UEFA Champions League semi-finals against Manchester United on 24 April. Kalac finished his second season at Milan having made 10 appearances in the Serie A and another three in the Champions League.

In March 2007, Kalac signed a contract extension with Milan, keeping him at the San Siro until at least 2009. In the 2007–08 season, he made appearances in the Champions League again after Dida was suspended for simulation in a match against Celtic, helping Milan through to the knockout phase. Kalac made a number of appearances in the Serie A, after Dida suffered a combination of injuries and poor form midway through the season. Kalac notably kept a clean sheet away to Fiorentina on 3 February 2008 as he snuffed out a Fiorentina attack moments before the final whistle, a save that earned praise from media and coach Ancelotti. Later in the month he collected another clean sheet at the Emirates Stadium against Arsenal in a 0–0 draw during the first leg of the UEFA Champions League round of sixteen, producing several good saves in the second half and being named Man of the Match by UEFA. In the second leg of the tie, he conceded two late goals as Milan were eliminated by Arsenal after a 2–0 loss at the San Siro.

The combination of Christian Abbiati's return from his loan spell at Atlético Madrid and a poor performance in Milan's 5–0 Russian Railways Cup thrashing at the hands of Chelsea on 4 August 2008 spelled the end of Kalac's brief first-team run. He was consequently demoted to third-choice behind Abbiati and Dida, and did not play for Milan again until appearing in the second half of a friendly against Hannover 96 on 29 January 2009, and one Serie A appearance against Juventus as an injury replacement on 10 May. He was released by Milan on 11 August, following an agreement reached with the club.

=== Kavala ===
On 1 September 2009, Kalac signed a two-year deal with Greek Super League side Kavala joining fellow goalkeeper Charles Itandje in moving to the club and Fanis Katergiannakis who won UEFA Euro 2004. He made his Greek Super League debut for in the 2–2 home draw against Panathinaikos on 18 October 2009.

Following the end of the 2009–10 season with Kavala, Kalac announced his retirement from club football.

== International career ==
Kalac was an Australian international for more than fourteen years, but has spent many years as understudy to first Mark Bosnich and later Mark Schwarzer. He was selected as a member of Australia's 2006 FIFA World Cup squad, making one appearance.

He was part of the Australian squad for the 1989 FIFA U-16 World Championship as second-choice keeper behind Schwarzer. He was again a squad member for the 1991 FIFA World Youth Championship again as a second choice, but this time behind Bosnich. His first full international appearance was against Malaysia on 11 August 1992, as a stand in for Robert Zabica. Australia lost 1–0, and he was replaced for the next match by club teammate Tony Franken.

In Australia's final first round match of the 2006 FIFA World Cup between Croatia and Australia, coach Guus Hiddink surprisingly selected Kalac over Schwarzer. With Australia needing a draw or better to advance and with the score tied at one apiece in the second half, Kalac fumbled a long range shot from Niko Kovač and conceded what he later described as a "shit goal". Fortunately for Kalac and the Australians, Harry Kewell scored later in the half and they advanced to the round of sixteen. After the match, Kalac spoke of his relief: "You're looking at the ground to eat you up. Obviously for me, it's very relieving to get that result." His performance sparked criticism in Australia, dubbed by the fact Kalac himself is of Croatian descent.

Kalac announced his international retirement on 4 October 2006. He played his last game against Paraguay on 7 October, along with fellow international retirees Tony Popovic, Tony Vidmar and Stan Lazaridis, coming off as a substitute in the 90th minute for Schwarzer.

== Coaching career ==
On 9 August 2011, it was announced he had signed a contract to be goalkeeping coach at A-League club Sydney FC. Despite the dismissal of Frank Farina at the conclusion of the 2013–14 season, Kalac chose to remain at the club, working under new manager Graham Arnold. At the end of the 2014–15 season, with one year remaining on his contract, it was announced that he would be leaving Sydney FC, eventually being replaced by one of Arnold's closest coaches John Crawley.

On 22 May 2015, it was announced that Kalac would join cross-town rivals Western Sydney Wanderers, reuniting with fellow coach Tony Popovic, whom he worked with at Sydney FC.

On 1 October 2017, Kalac would leave his position as goalkeeper coach at the Wanderers to follow manager Tony Popovic and assistant coach Andrés Carrasco to Karabükspor in the Turkish League. He was replaced by fellow goalkeeping coach Davide Del Giovine, who worked with him as an understudy at Sydney FC and during his time at the Wanderers.

In July 2018, Kalac joined Melbourne City as their goalkeeping coach.

For the 2020 NPL NSW season, Kalac joined Sydney United 58 as their manager, the first time he will hold a full managerial position.

Kalac left Sydney United in September to join Greek 2nd Division side Xanthi as their goalkeeping coach, joining head coach Tony Popovic. Kalac left Xanthi in February 2021.

In October 2021, Kalac became head coach of Croatian 3rd division side NK Urania Baška Voda, who play in the Croatian Third Football League - South. On 30 October 2022, Kalac left the position due to personal reasons.

In January 2023, Kalac was signed by Macarthur FC Academy team Bulls Academy as their new head coach for the upcoming 2023 NPL NSW season. But after a last placed finish which saw Bulls Academy relegated, Kalac was replaced by Craig Noone for the 2024 season NSW NPL League One season.

Kalac was quickly snapped up by his former club Sydney United 58, as their new head coach for the 2024 NPL NSW season. After taking Sydney United to the Preliminary Final, where they were eliminated, Kalac left Sydney United and joined NSW NPL League One side Inter Lions as their Head of Men's Football.

In May 2025, Kalac became Iraq national football team goalkeeping coach, alongside head coach Graham Arnold.

== Personal life ==
Kalac has a daughter Abby, and a son Oliver who is also a goalkeeper playing for APIA Leichhardt in the National Premier Leagues NSW.

== Career statistics ==
=== Club ===
As of 1 September 2009

Appearances and goals by club, season and competition
| Club | Season | League | | | National cup (Note: Includes FA Cup, KNVB Cup, Coppa Italia, Greek Cup.) | | League cup (Note: Includes Football League Cup, Greek League Cup.) | | Continental | | Other | | Total | |
| Club | Season | Division | Apps | Goals | Apps | Goals | Apps | Goals | Apps | Goals | Apps | Goals | Apps | Goals |
|---|---|---|---|---|---|---|---|---|---|---|---|---|---|---|
| Sydney United | 1989–90 | NSL | 11 | 0 | | | – | | – | | – | | | |
| Sydney United | 1990–91 | NSL | 0 | 0 | | | – | | – | | – | | | |
| Sydney United | 1991–92 | NSL | 21 | 0 | | | – | | – | | – | | | |
| Sydney United | 1992–93 | NSL | 11 | 0 | | | – | | – | | – | | | |
| Sydney United | 1993–94 | NSL | 25 | 0 | | | – | | – | | – | | | |
| Sydney United | 1994–95 | NSL | 24 | 0 | | | – | | – | | – | | | |
| Sydney United | Total | | 92 | 0 | | | 0 | 0 | 0 | 0 | 0 | 0 | | |
| Leicester City | 1995–96 | First Division | 1 | 0 | 0 | 0 | 1 | 0 | – | | 1 (Note: Appearance in play-offs) | 0 | 3 | 0 |
| Sydney United | 1996–97 | NSL | 7 | 0 | | | – | | – | | – | | | |
| Sydney United | 1997–98 | NSL | 15 | 0 | | | – | | – | | – | | | |
| Sydney United | Total | | 22 | 0 | | | 0 | 0 | 0 | 0 | 0 | 0 | | |
| Roda JC | 1998–99 | Eredivisie | 33 | 0 | | | – | | – | | – | | | |
| Roda JC | 1999–2000 | Eredivisie | 30 | 0 | | | – | | 4 | 0 | – | | | |
| Roda JC | 2000–01 | Eredivisie | 20 | 0 | | | – | | 0 | 0 | – | | | |
| Roda JC | 2001–02 | Eredivisie | 32 | 0 | | | – | | 7 | 0 | – | | | |
| Roda JC | Total | | 115 | 0 | | | 0 | 0 | 11 | 0 | 0 | 0 | | |
| Perugia | 2002–03 | Serie A | 22 | 0 | 6 | 0 | – | | 2 (Note: Appearances in 2002 UEFA Intertoto Cup) | 0 | – | | 30 | 0 |
| Perugia | 2003–04 | Serie A | 29 | 0 | 0 | 0 | – | | 11 (Note: Include six appearances in 2003 UEFA Intertoto Cup) | 0 | 2 (Note: Appearances in relegation play-offs) | 0 | 42 | 0 |
| Perugia | 2004–05 | Serie B | 29 | 0 | 3 | 0 | – | | – | | – | | 32 | 0 |
| Perugia | Total | | 80 | 0 | 9 | 0 | 0 | 0 | 13 | 0 | 2 | 0 | 104 | 0 |
| AC Milan | 2005–06 | Serie A | 2 | 0 | 4 | 0 | – | | 1 | 0 | – | | 7 | 0 |
| AC Milan | 2006–07 | Serie A | 10 | 0 | 3 | 0 | – | | 3 | 0 | – | | 16 | 0 |
| AC Milan | 2007–08 | Serie A | 25 | 0 | 2 | 0 | – | | 5 | 0 | – | | 32 | 0 |
| AC Milan | 2008–09 | Serie A | 1 | 0 | 0 | 0 | – | | 0 | 0 | – | | 1 | 0 |
| AC Milan | Total | | 38 | 0 | 9 | 0 | 0 | 0 | 9 | 0 | 0 | 0 | 56 | 0 |
| Kavala | 2009–10 | Super League Greece | 9 | 0 | 0 | 0 | – | | – | | – | | 9 | 0 |
| Career total | | | 350 | 0 | | | 1 | 0 | 33 | 0 | 3 | 0 | | |

=== International ===
Appearances and goals by national team and year
| National team | Year | Apps | Goals |
|---|---|---|---|
| Australia | 1992 | 1 | 0 |
| Australia | 1993 | 0 | 0 |
| Australia | 1994 | 5 | 0 |
| Australia | 1995 | 7 | 0 |
| Australia | 1996 | 7 | 0 |
| Australia | 1997 | 6 | 0 |
| Australia | 1998 | 3 | 0 |
| Australia | 1999 | 0 | 0 |
| Australia | 2000 | 9 | 0 |
| Australia | 2001 | 0 | 0 |
| Australia | 2002 | 0 | 0 |
| Australia | 2003 | 1 | 0 |
| Australia | 2004 | 7 | 0 |
| Australia | 2005 | 4 | 0 |
| Australia | 2006 | 4 | 0 |
| Total | | 54 | 0 |

== Honours ==
Leicester City

- Football League First Division play-offs: 1996

Sydney United

- National Soccer League Premiership: 1996-97

Roda JC

- KNVB Cup: 2000

Perugia

- UEFA Intertoto Cup: 2003

AC Milan

- UEFA Champions League: 2006–07
- UEFA Super Cup: 2007
- FIFA Club World Cup: 2007

Australia

- FIFA Confederations Cup runner-up: 1997
- OFC Nations Cup: 1996, 2000, 2004
