= Khalid Sinouh =

Morocco international footballer (born 1975)

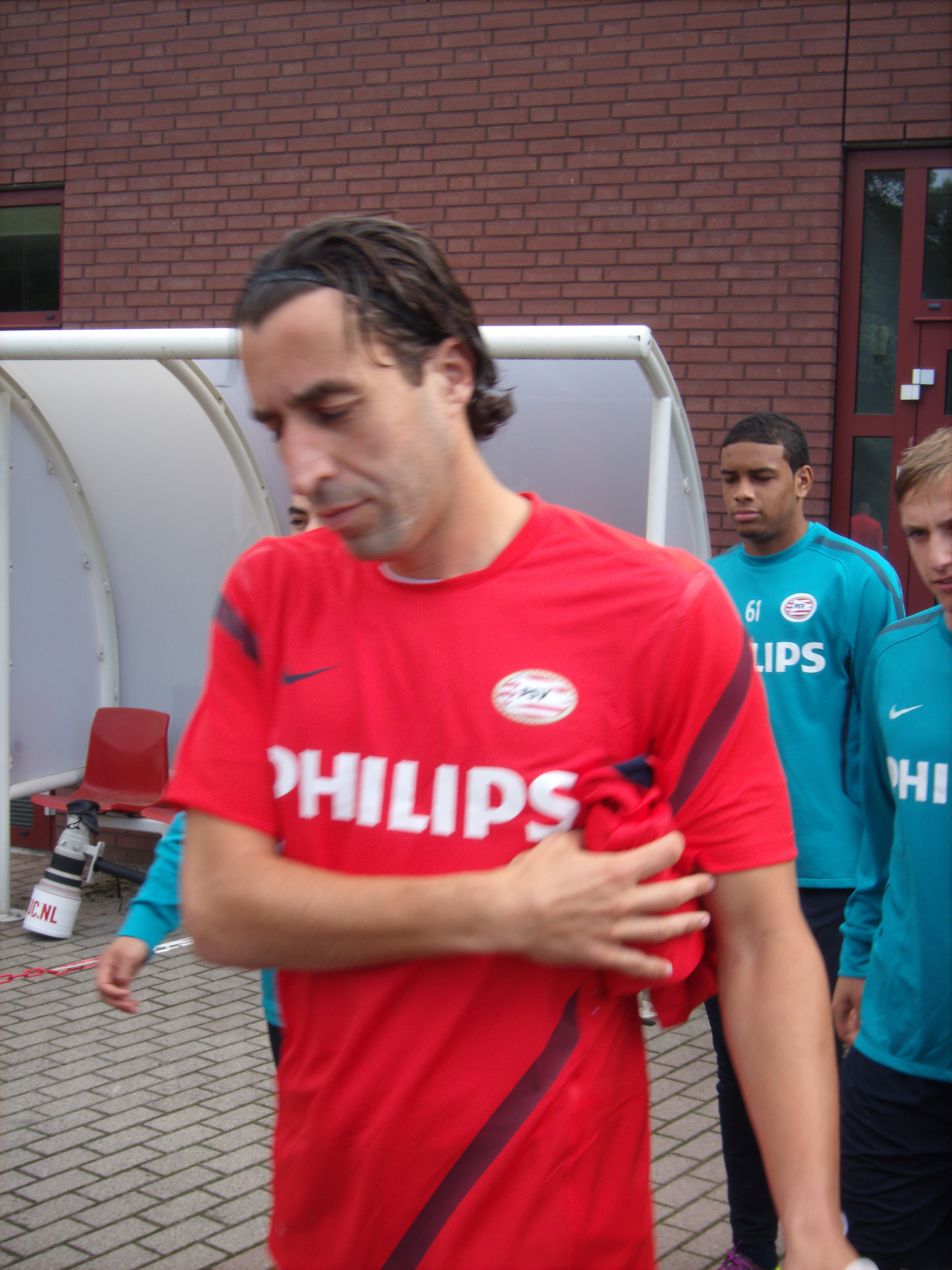
- Sinouh with PSV in 2011

Personal information
- Date of birth: 2 May 1975 (age 51)
- Place of birth: Amsterdam, Netherlands
- Height: 1.91 m (6 ft 3 in)
- Position: Goalkeeper

Senior career*
| Years | Team | Apps | (Gls) |
| 1994–1997 | Haarlem | 46 | (0) |
| 1997–1999 | Heerenveen | 1 | (0) |
| 1999–2005 | RKC Waalwijk | 93 | (0) |
| 2005–2006 | Omonia Nicosia | 11 | (0) |
| 2006–2007 | AZ | 11 | (0) |
| 2007–2008 | Kasımpaşa | 23 | (0) |
| 2009 | Hamburger SV | 0 | (0) |
| 2009–2011 | Utrecht | 2 | (0) |
| 2011–2012 | PSV | 1 | (0) |
| 2012–2013 | NEC | 6 | (0) |
| 2013–2014 | Sparta Rotterdam | 38 | (0) |
| Total | | 232 | (0) |

International career
| 2004–2005 | Morocco | 4 | (0) |
- * Club domestic league appearances and goals

Khalid Sinouh (Arabic: خالد سينوح; born 2 May 1975) is a former professional footballer who played as a goalkeeper. Born in the Netherlands, he represented Morocco at international level.

== Career ==
Sinouh debuted playing for HFC Haarlem in the Dutch second-tier Eerste Divisie at the age of 19 in the 1994–95 season. After three seasons playing for Haarlem, he signed for Eerste Divisie club, SC Heerenveen in 1997. He only played one match in a year and a half for Heerenveen. RKC Waalwijk became Sinouh's new club in the middle of the 1998–99 season. The Moroccan keeper was the second keeper behind the experienced Rob van Dijk and for two seasons he made no appearances. After years on the bench, he played again in the season 2000–01 having three appearances.

The two seasons that followed, Sinouh took his chance by proving that he could be a trustworthy goalkeeper as Rob van Dijk was. Between 2001 and 2003, he played 23 matches. After the transfer of Van Dijk to PSV in the summer of 2003, the club decided to promote Sinouh to first goalkeeper. In the season 2003–2004, Sinouh played 33 league matches and the following season 34 and he proved that he was a skillful goalkeeper.

Sinouh refused to sign a contract extension in the summer of 2005 with RKC Waalwijk, as he eyed a move outside of the Netherlands, rejecting offers by NEC and NAC Breda. However, he initially did not manage to find a new club and he remained a free agent for six months. In early 2006, he signed with Cypriot club Omonia Nicosia and played in 11 matches. However, due to a bad game he had in his last appearance with his team, he was not used again until the end of the season where he finished his career in Cyprus, since he was no longer needed by Omonia.

He signed for AZ Alkmaar in the summer of 2006. At the beginning of the 2006–07 season, he was not playing in the first six matches, but subsequently the injury of first team goalkeeper Joey Didulica, gave him the chance to gain the first keeper position and to help his team in their effort of winning the second position. He also made his debut in European competition, playing with AZ in the UEFA Cup groups.

In April 2007, Sinouh was subject of controversy after he had threatened a journalist who had, in Sinouh's opinion, written negatively about Sinouh.

Sinouh joined Turkish club Kasımpaşa in 2007, but they were forced to release him in September 2008 after they failed to pay his wages. He then went on trial with Scottish Premier League club Hibernian, but failed to win a contract. From July 2008 to 31 January 2009 was without a club after being released by Kasımpaşa and joined as third keeper to Hamburger SV, played here his second time under Martin Jol. He was also member of the reserve team from HSV and played his first game here on 28 February 2009 against VfB Lübeck in the Regionalliga Nord.

On 15 April 2011, he signed a one-year deal with PSV Eindhoven. He joined the club after the end of the 2010–11 season. On 18 September 2011, Sinouh made his first Eredivisie appearance for PSV in a match against Ajax, replacing Przemysław Tytoń who suffered a head injury in a collision with his own defender.

On 6 August 2012, Sinouh signed a one-year deal with NEC.

== International ==
He has been capped by the Moroccan national team four times in the years 2004 and 2005.
