= 2003–04 Rangers F.C. season =

Rangers
2003–04 season
- Chairman: John McClelland
- Manager: Alex McLeish
- Ground: Ibrox Stadium
- Scottish Premier League: 2nd
- Scottish Cup: Quarter-finals
- League Cup: Semi-finals
- Champions League: Group stage
- Top goalscorer: League: Shota Arveladze (12); All: Shota Arveladze (15)
- Highest home attendance: 49,962 vs Aberdeen (22 November)
- Lowest home attendance: 29,395 vs St Johnstone (3 December)
Home colours	Away colours	Third colours

The 2003–04 season was the 124th season of competitive football by Rangers.

== Overview ==
Rangers played a total of 52 competitive matches during the 2003–04 season. The season ended trophyless. Due to the club's financial situation they had to resort to selling many top players. These included Barry Ferguson, Lorenzo Amoruso and Neil McCann, they also released high earners Arthur Numan and Bert Konterman.

Despite starting the season well with seven consecutive wins and topping the table, a 1–0 loss at home to Celtic in October saw Rangers season unravel. Inconsistent form and three old firm derby defeats saw Rangers fall behind Celtic in the title race and ended up finishing 17 points off top spot.

The Scottish Cup campaign ended in the third round after a 1–0 defeat to Celtic. The League Cup campaign also ended in defeat at the semi-final stage to Hibernian at Hampden Park, 4–3 on penalties.

In Europe Rangers managed to qualify for the group stages of the 2003–04 UEFA Champions League with a win over F.C. Copenhagen in the third qualifying round. They were drawn in the group stages alongside English Champions Manchester United, Stuttgart and Panathinaikos. Despite earning 4 points from the first two matches Rangers were to finish bottom of the group.

== Players ==
=== Squad information ===
N	Pos.	Nat.	Name	Age	Since	App	Goals	Ends	Transfer fee	Notes
1	GK	(Germany)	Stefan Klos	32	1998			2007	£0.7m	
2	DF	(Netherlands)	Fernando Ricksen	27	2000			2009	£3.75m	
3	DF	(Australia)	Craig Moore (captain)	28	1999 (Winter)			2006	0.9m	
4	MF	(Brazil)	Emerson	32	2003	18	1	2005	Free	
5	DF	(Netherlands)	Frank de Boer	34	2004 (Winter)	17	2	2004	Free	
6	MF	(Scotland)	Barry Ferguson	26	1998	255	38		Youth system	left on 29 August
7	FW	(Georgia (country))	Shota Arveladze	26	2001			2005	£2m	
8	MF	(Germany)	Christian Nerlinger	31	2001				£1.8m	
9	FW	(Norway)	Egil Østenstad	31	2003	17	2	2004	Free	left on 18 March
10	FW	(Netherlands)	Michael Mols	33	1999	147	48	2004	£4m	
11	MF	(Scotland)	Gavin Rae	26	2004 (Winter)	11	2	2007	£0.25m	
12	DF	(Scotland)	Bob Malcolm	23	1997	98	3	2007	Youth system	
14	MF	(Netherlands)	Ronald de Boer	34	2000			2004	£4m	
15	DF	(Georgia (country))	Zurab Khizanishvili	22	2003	38	0	2006	Free	
16	DF	(Italy)	Paolo Vanoli	31	2003	35	1	2005	Free	
17	DF	(Australia)	Kevin Muscat	31						
18	DF	(England)	Michael Ball	24	2001			2006	£6.5m	
19	FW	(Scotland)	Steven Thompson	20	2003 (Winter)			2006	£0.2m	
20	MF	(Portugal)	Nuno Capucho	32	2003	32	6	2005	£0.7m	
21	DF	(Scotland)	Maurice Ross	23	2000				Youth system	
22	GK	(Scotland)	Allan McGregor	22	2001				Youth system	
26	FW	(Denmark)	Peter Løvenkrands	25	2000				£1.3m	
27	MF	(Scotland)	Stephen Hughes	22	1999	90	7		Youth system	
30	MF	(Scotland)	Chris Burke	21	2000	44	5	2007	Youth system	
32	DF	(Scotland)	Alan Hutton	20	2002	24	1		Youth system	

- Last updated: 22 May 2004
- Source: Players transfer, Wikipedia players' articles
- Ordered by position on pitch.

=== Transfers ===
==== In ====
Date	Player	From	Fee
17 June 2003	(Portugal) Nuno Capucho	(Portugal) Porto	£700,000
18 July 2003	(Georgia (country)) Zurab Khizanishvili	(Scotland) Dundee	Free
4 August 2003	(Italy) Paolo Vanoli	(Italy) Bologna	Free
5 August 2003	(Norway) Henning Berg	(England) Blackburn Rovers	Free
29 August 2003	(Brazil) Emerson	(Spain) Atlético Madrid	Free
30 August 2003	(Norway) Egil Østenstad	(England) Blackburn Rovers	Free
18 September 2003	(Tunisia) Hamed Namouchi	(France) Cannes	Free
18 September 2003	(France) Marc Kalenga	(France) Auxerre	Free
31 December 2003	(Scotland) Gavin Rae	(Scotland) Dundee	£207,000
26 January 2004	(Netherlands) Frank de Boer	(Turkey) Galatasaray	Free
31 January 2004	(North Macedonia) Bajram Fetai	(Denmark) B.93	£200,000

==== Out ====
Date	Player	To	Fee
1 June 2003	(Norway) Dan Eggen	(France) Le Mans	Free
1 June 2003	(Netherlands) Arthur Numan	Retired	
1 June 2003	(France) Jérôme Bonnissel	(England) Fulham	Free
1 June 2003	(Scotland) Stephen Dobbie	(Scotland) Hibernian	Free
3 June 2003	(England) Paul Reid	(England) Northampton Town	£100,000
4 June 2003	(Argentina) Claudio Caniggia	Qatar SC	Free
7 July 2003	(Netherlands) Bert Konterman	(Netherlands) Vitesse	Free
14 July 2003	(Italy) Lorenzo Amoruso	(England) Blackburn Rovers	£1,400,000
30 July 2003	(Scotland) Steven MacLean	(England) Scunthorpe United	Loan
5 August 2003	(Scotland) Neil McCann	(England) Southampton	£1,500,000
21 August 2003	(Scotland) Jimmy Gibson	(Scotland) Clyde	Free
29 August 2003	(Scotland) Barry Ferguson	(England) Blackburn Rovers	£7,500,000
29 August 2003	(Australia) Kevin Muscat	(England) Millwall	Free
16 January 2004	(Denmark) Jesper Christiansen	(Denmark) Viborg FF	Free
18 March 2004	(Norway) Egil Østenstad	(Norway) Viking FK	Free

- Expenditure: ▼£1,107,000
- Income: ▲£10,500,000
- Total loss/gain: ▲£9,393,000

=== Player statistics ===
No.	Player	Position	Appearances	Goals
1	(Germany) Stefan Klos	GK	46	0
2	(Netherlands) Fernando Ricksen	DF	42	1
3	(Australia) Craig Moore	DF	25	2
4	(Brazil) Emerson	MF	18	1
5	(Netherlands) Frank de Boer	DF	17	2
6	(Scotland) Barry Ferguson	MF	5	0
7	(Georgia (country)) Shota Arveladze	FW	29	15
8	(Germany) Christian Nerlinger	MF	21	5
9	(Norway) Egil Østenstad	FW	17	2
10	(Netherlands) Michael Mols	FW	45	12
11	(Scotland) Gavin Rae	MF	11	2
12	(Scotland) Robert Malcolm	DF	17	0
14	(Netherlands) Ronald de Boer	MF	21	3
15	(Georgia (country)) Zurab Khizanishvili	DF	38	0
16	(Italy) Paolo Vanoli	DF	35	1
17	(Australia) Kevin Muscat	DF	0	0
18	(England) Michael Ball	DF	43	1
19	(Scotland) Steven Thompson	FW	19	8
20	(Portugal) Nuno Capucho	MF	32	6
21	(Scotland) Maurice Ross	DF	30	1
22	(Scotland) Allan McGregor	GK	6	0
23	(Spain) Mikel Arteta	MF	33	9
24	(Scotland) Steven MacLean	FW	0	0
25	(Norway) Henning Berg	DF	30	0
26	(Denmark) Peter Løvenkrands	MF	36	13
27	(Scotland) Stephen Hughes	MF	28	3
29	(Denmark) Jesper Christiansen	GK	0	0
30	(Scotland) Chris Burke	MF	26	4
32	(Scotland) Alan Hutton	DF	11	1
37	(Tunisia) Hamed Namouchi	MF	9	3
38	(Scotland) Darryl Duffy	FW	3	0
40	(Scotland) Alex Walker	MF	2	0
45	(Scotland) Charlie Adam	MF	2	0
48	(Scotland) Gary MacKenzie	DF	2	0
49	(Scotland) Bob Davidson	FW	1	0
50	(Scotland) Ross McCormack	FW	1	0
52	(North Macedonia) Bajram Fetai	FW	1	0

== Club ==
=== Board of directors ===
Position	Staff
Chairman	(Scotland) John McClelland
Honorary chairman	(Scotland) David Murray
Director of Football Business	(Scotland) Martin Bain
Director of Finance	(Scotland) Douglas Odam (until 28 August) (Scotland) David Jolliffe (from 1 August)
Director of Retail	(England) Nick Peel
Company Secretary	(Scotland) Campbell Ogilvie
Non-executive director	(Scotland) John Greig (from 11 February)
Non-executive director	(Scotland) Alastair Johnston (from 11 February)
Non-executive director	(Scotland) Dave King
Non-executive director	(England) Daniel Levy
Non-executive director	(Scotland) Donald Wilson
Non-executive director	(Scotland) Ian Skelly (until 27 June)

=== Coaching staff ===
Position	Staff
Manager	(Scotland) Alex McLeish
Assistant Manager	(Scotland) Andy Watson
First-team coach	(Netherlands) Jan Wouters
Goalkeepers coach	(Scotland) Billy Thomson

Source: Wikipedia article

=== Other staff ===
Position	Staff
Physiotherapist	(Scotland) Davie Henderson
Doctor	(Scotland) Dr Iain McGuiness
Chief scout	(Scotland) Ewan Chester
Team analyst	(Scotland) Steve Harvey (from September)
Massuer	(Scotland) David Lavery
Kit controller	(Scotland) Jimmy Bell

Source: Wikipedia article

== Matches ==
=== Friendlies ===
Date	Opponent	Venue	Result	Attendance	Scorers
16 July 2003	Greuther Fürth	N	2–0	3,500	Thompson (2)
19 July 2003	VfB Auerbach	A	5–1	2,500	Mols (3), Capucho, Løvenkrands
19 July 2003	Erzgebirge Aue	A	1–0	2,500	R.de Boer
22 July 2003	Jahn Regensburg	A	1–2	5,000	Nerlinger
26 July 2003	Everton	H	2–3	28,000	Thompson, Mols
30 July 2003	Linfield	A	3–0	13,284	R.de Boer, Dowie, MacLean
5 August 2003	Arsenal	H	0–3	37,000	

=== Scottish Premier League ===
Date	Opponent	Venue	Result	Attendance	Scorers
9 August 2003	Kilmarnock	H	4–0	49,108	Løvenkrands, Mols, Arteta (2, 1 pen)
16 August 2003	Aberdeen	A	3–2	16,348	R. de Boer, Arteta, Mols
23 August 2003	Hibernian	H	5–2	49,642	Mols (2), O'Connor (o.g.), Arteta, Burke
31 August 2003	Dundee United	A	3–1	11,111	Capucho, Arveladze, Arteta (pen.)
13 September 2003	Dunfermline Athletic	H	4–0	49,072	Thompson, Mols, Arveladze, Capucho
21 September 2003	Heart of Midlothian	A	4–0	14,732	Arveladze (2), Løvenkrands (2)
27 September 2003	Dundee	H	3–1	49,548	Arveladze (2), Vanoli
4 October 2003	Celtic	H	0–1	49,825	
19 October 2003	Motherwell	A	1–1	10,824	Arveladze
25 October 2003	Livingston	A	0–0	9,627	
1 November 2003	Partick Thistle	H	3–1	49,551	Arteta (2, 1 pen.), Mols
9 November 2003	Kilmarnock	A	3–2	12,204	Arveladze (2), Capucho
22 November 2003	Aberdeen	H	3–0	49,962	Hughes, Løvenkrands (2),
30 November 2003	Hibernian	A	1–0	11,160	Hughes
6 December 2003	Dundee United	H	2–1	49,307	Capucho, Løvenkrands
14 December 2003	Dunfermline Athletic	A	0–2	8,592	
20 December 2003	Hearts	H	2–1	49,592	Arveladze, Burke
28 December 2003	Dundee	A	2–0	10,948	Capucho, Ball
3 January 2004	Celtic	A	0–3	59,087	
17 January 2004	Motherwell	H	1–0	48,925	Arveladze
24 January 2004	Livingston	H	1–0	48,638	Nerlinger
1 February 2004	Partick Thistle	A	1–0	8,220	Løvenkrands
11 February 2004	Kilmarnock	H	2–0	46,900	Moore, Namouchi
14 February 2004	Aberdeen	A	1–1	15,815	F.de Boer
21 February 2004	Hibernian	H	3–0	49,698	Arveladze (pen), Mols, Thompson(pen)
29 February 2004	Dundee United	A	0–2	10,497	
13 March 2004	Hearts	A	1–1	14,598	Moore(pen)
20 March 2004	Dundee	H	4–0	49,364	Løvenkrands, F.de Boer, Rae, Thompson
23 March 2004	Dunfermline Athletic	H	4–1	47,487	Hutton, Løvenkrands, R.de Boer, Mols
28 March 2004	Celtic	H	1–2	49,909	Thompson
4 April 2004	Motherwell	A	1–0	8,967	Hughes
14 April 2004	Livingston	A	1–1	6,096	Mols
17 April 2004	Partick Thistle	H	2–0	49,279	Thompson, Rae
24 April 2004	Dundee United	A	3–3	8,339	Thompson (2, 1 pen), Namouchi
1 May 2004	Motherwell	H	4–0	47,579	Arteta, Ross, Namouchi, Thompson
8 May 2004	Celtic	A	0–1	59,180	
12 May 2004	Hearts	H	0–1	47,467	
16 May 2004	Dunfermline Athletic	A	3–2	6,798	Ricksen, Burke, McCormack (pen.)

=== Scottish League Cup ===
Date	Round	Opponent	Venue	Result	Attendance	Scorers
28 October 2003	R3	Forfar Athletic	H	6–0	26,327	Nerlinger (3), Løvenkrands, Capucho, Østenstad
3 December 2003	QF	St Johnstone	H	3–0	11,072	Burke, Østenstad, Mols
5 February 2004	SF	Hibernian	N	*1–1	27,954	Mols

*Rangers lost the match 4–3 on penalties

=== Scottish Cup ===
Date	Round	Opponent	Venue	Result	Attendance	Scorers
10 January 2004	R3	Hibernian	A	2–0	11,392	Arveladze, Løvenkrands
8 February 2004	R4	Kilmarnock	A	2–0	11,072	R.de Boer, Arveladze (pen.)
7 March 2004	QF	Celtic	A	0–1	58,735	

=== UEFA Champions League ===
Date	Round	Opponent	Venue	Result	Attendance	Scorers
13 August 2003	QR3	(Denmark) Copenhagen	H	1–1	47,401	Løvenkrands
27 August 2003	QR3	(Denmark) Copenhagen	A	2–1	35,519	Arteta (pen.), Arveladze
16 September 2003	GS	(Germany) VfB Stuttgart	H	2–1	47,957	Nerlinger, Løvenkrands
1 October 2003	GS	(Greece) Panathinaikos	A	1–1	13,718	Emerson
22 October 2003	GS	(England) Manchester United	H	0–1	48,730	
4 November 2003	GS	(England) Manchester United	A	0–3	66,707	
26 November 2003	GS	(Germany) VfB Stuttgart	A	0–1	50,348	
9 December 2003	GS	(Greece) Panathinaikos	H	1–3	48,588	Mols

== Competitions ==
=== Overall ===
Competition	Started round	Current position / round	Final position / round	First match	Last match
Scottish Premier League	—	—	2nd	11 August	4 May
Scottish Cup	Third round	—	Quarter-finals	29 July	18 September
League Cup	Third round	—	Semi-finals	7 August	31 October
UEFA Champions League	Third qualifying round	—	Group stage	29 September	2 February

=== Scottish Premier League ===
==== Standings ====
Pos	Team	Pld	W	D	L	GF	GA	GD	Pts	Qualification or relegation (Note: Teams played each other three times (33 matches), before the league split into two groups (the top six and the bottom six) for the last five matches.)
1	Celtic (C)	38	31	5	2	105	25	+80	98	Qualification for the Champions League group stage
2	Rangers	38	25	6	7	76	33	+43	81	Qualification for the Champions League third qualifying round
3	Heart of Midlothian	38	19	11	8	56	40	+16	68	Qualification for the UEFA Cup first round (Note: As Celtic, the 2003–04 Scottish Cup winners, qualified for the UEFA Champions League via their league position, the place in the UEFA Cup was passed onto Dunfermline Athletic, the cup runners-up.)
4	Dunfermline Athletic	38	14	11	13	45	52	−7	53	Qualification for the UEFA Cup first round
5	Dundee United	38	13	10	15	47	60	−13	49	

Source: Scottish Professional Football League
Rules for classification: 1) Points; 2) Goal difference; 3) Goals scored
(C) Champions

==== Results summary ====
Overall								Home						Away					
Pld	W	D	L	GF	GA	GD	Pts	W	D	L	GF	GA	GD	W	D	L	GF	GA	GD
18	14	3	1	51	14	+37	45	8	0	0	26	3	+23	6	3	1	25	11	+14

Last updated: 2 January 2013.

==== Results by round ====
Round	1	2	3	4	5	6	7	8	9	10	11	12	13	14	15	16	17	18	19	20	21	22	23	24	25	26	27	28	29	30	31	32	33	34	35	36	37	38
Ground	H	A	H	A	H	A	H	H	A	A	H	A	H	A	H	A	H	A	A	H	H	A	H	A	H	A	A	H	H	H	A	A	H	A	H	A	H	A
Result	W	W	W	W	W	W	W	L	D	D	W	W	W	W	W	L	W	W	L	W	W	W	W	D	W	L	D	W	W	L	W	D	W	D	W	L	L	W

A = Away; H = Home; W = Win; D = Draw; L = Loss

=== Champions league table ===
Pos	Team	Pld	W	D	L	GF	GA	GD	Pts	Qualification	MUN	STU	PAN	RAN
1	(England) Manchester United	6	5	0	1	13	2	+11	15	Advance to knockout stage	—	2–0	5–0	3–0
2	(Germany) VfB Stuttgart	6	4	0	2	9	6	+3	12	Advance to knockout stage	2–1	—	2–0	1–0
3	(Greece) Panathinaikos	6	1	1	4	5	13	−8	4	Transfer to UEFA Cup	0–1	1–3	—	1–1
4	(Scotland) Rangers	6	1	1	4	4	10	−6	4		0–1	2–1	1–3	—

Source: RSSSF
