= Dutch Footballer of the Year =

Annual association football award

The title Dutch Footballer of the Year (Dutch: Voetballer van het Jaar) has been awarded in the Netherlands since 1984. The award is determined by a poll of Dutch professional footballers playing in the First (Eredivisie) and Second (Eerste Divisie) leagues.

Until 1997, it was an annual award, afterwards the prize was rewarded at the end of the football season. In 2006, the award merged with the annual prize named Golden Boot (Gouden Schoen), awarded since 1982 by the Dutch daily De Telegraaf and the Dutch football magazine Voetbal International.

== Footballer of the Year ==
Dutch Footballer of the Year			Golden Boot			Ref
Year	Player	Club	Year	Player	Club	
			1982	Martin Haar (NED)	HFC Haarlem	
			1983	Piet Schrijvers (NED)	Ajax	
1984	Ruud Gullit (NED)	Feyenoord	1984	Johan Cruyff (NED)	Feyenoord	
1985	Marco van Basten (NED)	Ajax	1985	Frank Rijkaard (NED)	Ajax	
1986	Ruud Gullit (NED)	PSV	1986	Ruud Gullit (NED)	PSV	
1987	Ronald Koeman (NED)	PSV	1987	Frank Rijkaard (NED)	Ajax	
1988	Ronald Koeman (NED)	PSV	1988	Gerald Vanenburg (NED)	PSV	
1989	Romário (BRA)	PSV	1989	Gerald Vanenburg (NED)	PSV	
1990	Jan Wouters (NED)	Ajax	1990	Edward Sturing (NED)	Vitesse	
1991	Dennis Bergkamp (NED)	Ajax	1991	Henny Meijer (NED)	Groningen	
1992	Dennis Bergkamp (NED)	Ajax	1992	John Metgod (NED)	Feyenoord	
1993	Jari Litmanen (FIN)	Ajax	1993	Marc Overmars (NED)	Ajax	
1994	Ronald de Boer (NED)	Ajax	1994	Ed de Goey (NED)	Feyenoord	
1995	Luc Nilis (BEL)	PSV	1995	Danny Blind (NED)	Ajax	
1996	Ronald de Boer (NED)	Ajax	1996	Danny Blind (NED)	Ajax	
1997	Jaap Stam (NED)	PSV	1997	Jaap Stam (NED)	PSV	
			1998	Edwin van der Sar (NED)	Ajax	
1998–99	Ruud van Nistelrooy (NED)	PSV	1999	Michael Mols (NED)	Utrecht	
1999–2000	Ruud van Nistelrooy (NED)	PSV	2000	Jerzy Dudek (POL)	Feyenoord	
2000–01	Mark van Bommel (NED)	PSV	2001	Johann Vogel (SUI)	PSV	
2001–02	Pierre van Hooijdonk (NED)	Feyenoord	2002	Cristian Chivu (ROM)	Ajax	
2002–03	Mateja Kežman (SCG)	PSV	2003	Dirk Kuyt (NED)	Utrecht	
2003–04	Maxwell (BRA)	Ajax	2004	Maxwell (BRA)	Ajax	
2004–05	Mark van Bommel (NED)	PSV	2005	Mark van Bommel (NED)	PSV	
Awards merged						
			2005–06	Dirk Kuyt (NED)	Feyenoord	
			2006–07	Afonso Alves (BRA)	Heerenveen	
			2007–08	John Heitinga (NED)	Ajax	
			2008–09	Mounir El Hamdaoui (MAR)	AZ	
			2009–10	Luis Suárez (URU)	Ajax	
			2010–11	Theo Janssen (NED)	Twente	
			2011–12	Jan Vertonghen (BEL)	Ajax	
			2012–13	Wilfried Bony (CIV)	Vitesse	
			2013–14	Daley Blind (NED)	Ajax	
			2014–15	Georginio Wijnaldum (NED)	PSV	
			2015–16	Davy Klaassen (NED)	Ajax	
			2016–17	Karim El Ahmadi (MAR)	Feyenoord	
			2017–18	Hakim Ziyech (MAR)	Ajax	
			2018–19	Matthijs de Ligt (NED)	Ajax	
			2019–20	not awarded as season was terminated early		
			2020–21	Dušan Tadić (SRB)	Ajax	
			2021–22	Cody Gakpo (NED)	PSV	
			2022–23	Orkun Kökçü (TUR)	Feyenoord	
			2023–24	Luuk de Jong (NED)	PSV	
			2024–25	Igor Paixão (BRA)	Feyenoord	

== Dutch Football Talent of the Year ==
The title Dutch Football Talent of the Year (Nederlands Voetbal Talent van het Jaar) has been awarded in the Netherlands since 1984 for footballers under 21. The award was replaced by the Johan Cruyff Trophy (Johan Cruijff Prijs) in 2003.

Dutch Football Talent of the Year
Year	Player	Club
1984	Mario Been (NED)	Feyenoord
1985	Frans van Rooy (NED)	PSV
1986	Aron Winter (NED)	Ajax
1987	Bryan Roy (NED)	Ajax
1988	Pieter Huistra (NED)	Twente
1989	Richard Witschge (NED)	Ajax
1990	Dennis Bergkamp (NED)	Ajax
1991	Gaston Taument (NED)	Feyenoord
1992	Marc Overmars (NED)	Ajax
1993	Clarence Seedorf (NED)	Ajax
1994	Clarence Seedorf (NED)	Ajax
1995	Patrick Kluivert (NED)	Ajax
1996	Jon Dahl Tomasson (DEN)	Heerenveen
1997	Boudewijn Zenden (NED)	PSV
1998–99	Mark van Bommel (NED)	Fortuna Sittard
1999–2000	Arnold Bruggink (NED)	PSV
2000–01	Rafael van der Vaart (NED)	Ajax
2001–02	Robin van Persie (NED)	Feyenoord
2002–03	Arjen Robben (NED)	PSV
2003–04	John Heitinga (NED)	Ajax
Johan Cruyff Trophy
2002–03	Arjen Robben (NED)	PSV
2003–04	Wesley Sneijder (NED)	Ajax
2004–05	Salomon Kalou (CIV)	Feyenoord
2005–06	Klaas-Jan Huntelaar (NED)	Ajax
2006–07	Ibrahim Afellay (NED)	PSV
2007–08	Miralem Sulejmani (SRB)	Heerenveen
2008–09	Eljero Elia (NED)	Twente
2009–10	Gregory van der Wiel (NED)	Ajax
2010–11	Christian Eriksen (DEN)	Ajax
2011–12	Adam Maher (NED)	AZ
2012–13	Marco van Ginkel (NED)	Vitesse
2013–14	Davy Klaassen (NED)	Ajax
2014–15	Memphis Depay (NED)	PSV
2015–16	Vincent Janssen (NED)	AZ
2016–17	Kasper Dolberg (DEN)	Ajax
2017–18	Matthijs de Ligt (NED)	Ajax
2018–19	Frenkie de Jong (NED)	Ajax
2019–20	not awarded as season was terminated early	
2020–21	Ryan Gravenberch (NED)	Ajax
2021–22	Jurriën Timber (NED)	Ajax
2022–23	Xavi Simons (NED)	PSV
2023–24	Johan Bakayoko (BEL)	PSV
2024–25	Jorrel Hato (NED)	Ajax

== Dutch Football Goalkeeper of the Year ==
Dutch Goalkeeper of the year
Year	Player	Club
1987	Hans van Breukelen (NED)	PSV
1988	Hans van Breukelen (NED)	PSV
1989	Ruud Hesp (NED)	Fortuna Sittard
1990	Stanley Menzo (NED)	Ajax
1991	Hans van Breukelen (NED)	PSV
1992	Hans van Breukelen (NED)	PSV
1993	Ed de Goey (NED)	Feyenoord
1994	Edwin van der Sar (NED)	Ajax
1995	Edwin van der Sar (NED)	Ajax
1996	Edwin van der Sar (NED)	Ajax
1997	Edwin van der Sar (NED)	Ajax
1998–99	Jerzy Dudek (POL)	Feyenoord
1999–2000	Jerzy Dudek (POL)	Feyenoord
2000–01	Ronald Waterreus (NED)	PSV
2001–02	Edwin Zoetebier (NED)	Feyenoord
2002–03	Dennis Gentenaar (NED)	NEC
2003–04	Gábor Babos (HUN)	NAC Breda

== Official Eredivisie Awards ==
Season	Player of the Season	Young Player of the Season	Goal of the Season	Ref.
2017–18	(Colombia) Santiago Arias (PSV)	(Brazil) David Neres (Ajax)	—N/a	
2018–19	(Netherlands) Frenkie de Jong (Ajax)	(Spain) Angeliño (PSV)	—N/a	
2019–20	not awarded as season was terminated early			
2020–21	(Serbia) Dusan Tadic (Ajax)	(Netherlands) Ryan Gravenberch (Ajax)	(Argentina) Marcos Senesi (Feyenoord)	
2021–22	(Netherlands) Jurriën Timber (Ajax)	—N/a	(Belgium) Cyril Ngonge (Groningen)	
2022–23	(Turkey) Orkun Kökcü (Feyenoord)	—N/a	(Netherlands) Michiel Kramer (Waalwijk)	
2023–24	(Netherlands) Luuk de Jong (PSV)	—N/a	(Brazil) Igor Paixão (Feyenoord)	
2024–25	(Netherlands) Sem Steijn (Twente)	—N/a	(Netherlands) Bryan Linssen (NEC)	
2025–26	(Morocco) Ismael Saibari (PSV)	—N/a	(Netherlands) Gyan de Regt (Excelsior)	

== See also ==
- Dutch Sportsman of the year
