= 1998–99 in Dutch football =

The 1998/1999 season in Dutch football was the 43rd season in the Eredivisie, where Feyenoord Rotterdam claimed the title, for the first time since 1993. Ajax Amsterdam won the Dutch National Cup.

== Johan Cruijff-schaal ==
August 16, 1998

| Ajax | 0–2 | PSV |
|---|---|---|
| | | Khokhlov 32'; Bruggink 53' |

Amsterdam ArenA, Amsterdam
Attendance: 39.500
Referee: Van der Ende

== Eredivisie ==
| Position | Team | Points | Played | Won | Drawn | Lost | For | Against | Difference |
|---|---|---|---|---|---|---|---|---|---|
| 1 | Feyenoord Rotterdam | 80 | 34 | 25 | 5 | 4 | 76 | 38 | +38 |
| 2 | Willem II Tilburg | 65 | 34 | 20 | 5 | 9 | 69 | 46 | +23 |
| 3 | PSV Eindhoven | 61 | 34 | 17 | 10 | 7 | 87 | 55 | +32 |
| 4 | Vitesse Arnhem | 61 | 34 | 18 | 7 | 9 | 61 | 44 | +17 |
| 5 | Roda JC | 60 | 34 | 17 | 9 | 8 | 59 | 50 | +19 |
| 6 | Ajax Amsterdam | 57 | 34 | 16 | 9 | 9 | 73 | 41 | +32 |
| 7 | SC Heerenveen | 54 | 34 | 14 | 12 | 8 | 53 | 41 | +12 |
| 8 | FC Twente | 52 | 34 | 13 | 13 | 8 | 51 | 45 | +6 |
| 9 | AZ Alkmaar | 48 | 34 | 12 | 12 | 10 | 52 | 60 | -8 |
| 10 | Fortuna Sittard | 44 | 34 | 12 | 8 | 14 | 49 | 56 | -7 |
| 11 | NEC Nijmegen | 39 | 34 | 10 | 9 | 15 | 42 | 56 | -14 |
| 12 | FC Utrecht | 38 | 34 | 10 | 8 | 16 | 54 | 64 | -10 |
| 13 | De Graafschap | 36 | 34 | 8 | 12 | 14 | 40 | 57 | -17 |
| 14 | MVV Maastricht | 32 | 34 | 7 | 11 | 16 | 42 | 63 | -21 |
| 15 | Cambuur Leeuwarden | 32 | 34 | 7 | 11 | 16 | 37 | 64 | -27 |
| 16 | RKC Waalwijk | 27 | 34 | 6 | 9 | 19 | 41 | 62 | -21 |
| 17 | Sparta Rotterdam | 26 | 34 | 7 | 5 | 22 | 37 | 71 | -35 |
| 18 | NAC Breda | 23 | 34 | 4 | 11 | 19 | 41 | 61 | -20 |

- Champions League : Feyenoord Rotterdam and Willem II
- Champions League qualification: PSV Eindhoven
- UEFA Cup: Vitesse, Roda JC and Ajax (Cup Winners)
- Promotion / relegation play-offs ("Nacompetitie"): RKC and Sparta
- Relegated: NAC Breda

=== Topscorers ===
| Position | Player | Nationality | Club | Goals |
|---|---|---|---|---|
| 1 | Ruud van Nistelrooy | (Netherlands) | PSV Eindhoven | 31 |
| 2 | Luc Nilis | (Belgium) | PSV Eindhoven | 24 |
| 3 | Jan Vennegoor of Hesselink | (Netherlands) | FC Twente | 21 |
| 4 | Michael Mols | (Netherlands) | FC Utrecht | 20 |
| 5 | Nikos Machlas | (Greece) | Vitesse Arnhem | 18 |
| 6 | Mariano Bombarda | (Spain) | Willem II Tilburg | 17 |
| – | Peter Van Houdt | (Belgium) | Roda JC | 17 |
| 8 | Julio Ricardo Cruz | (Argentina) | Feyenoord Rotterdam | 16 |
| – | Jack de Gier | (Netherlands) | NEC Nijmegen | 16 |
| – | Ronald Hamming | (Netherlands) | Fortuna Sittard | 16 |

=== Awards ===
==== Dutch Footballer of the Year ====
- 1998 – 1999 — Ruud van Nistelrooy (PSV Eindhoven)

==== Dutch Golden Shoe Winner ====
- 1998 — Edwin van der Sar (Ajax Amsterdam)
- 1999 — Michael Mols (FC Utrecht)

=== Feyenoord Winning Squad 1998-'99 ===
Goal

- (Poland) Jerzy Dudek
- (Netherlands) Edwin Zoetebier

Defence

- (Ghana) Patrick Allotey
- (Netherlands) Henk Fräser
- (Netherlands) Ulrich van Gobbel
- (Argentina) Patricio Graff
- (Ghana) Christian Gyan
- (Netherlands) Ferry de Haan
- (Netherlands) Bert Konterman
- (Uruguay) Fernando Picun
- (Netherlands) Bernard Schuiteman
- (Netherlands) Kees van Wonderen

Midfield

- (Netherlands) Paul Bosvelt
- (Netherlands) Jean-Paul van Gastel
- (Russia) Igor Korneev
- (Brazil) Tininho
- (Netherlands) Patrick Paauwe

Attack

- (Argentina) Julio Ricardo Cruz
- (Ivory Coast) Bonaventure Kalou
- (Netherlands) Robin Nelisse
- (Denmark) Jon Dahl Tomasson
- (Argentina) Pablo Sánchez
- (Netherlands) Henk Vos
- (Netherlands) Peter van Vossen

Management

- (Netherlands) Leo Beenhakker (Coach)
- (Netherlands) Geert Meijer (Assistant)
- (Netherlands) John Metgod (Assistant)

== Eerste Divisie ==
| Position | Team | Points | Played | Won | Drawn | Lost | For | Against | Difference |
|---|---|---|---|---|---|---|---|---|---|
| 1 | FC Den Bosch | 77 | 34 | 23 | 8 | 3 | 80 | 35 | +45 |
| 2 | FC Groningen | 64 | 34 | 19 | 7 | 8 | 69 | 33 | +36 |
| 3 | FC Emmen | 61 | 34 | 19 | 4 | 11 | 53 | 37 | +16 |
| 4 | Helmond Sport | 55 | 34 | 16 | 7 | 11 | 55 | 52 | +3 |
| 5 | FC Zwolle | 54 | 34 | 15 | 9 | 10 | 57 | 42 | +15 |
| 6 | Excelsior Rotterdam | 54 | 34 | 16 | 6 | 12 | 74 | 63 | +11 |
| 7 | Go Ahead Eagles | 50 | 34 | 14 | 8 | 12 | 59 | 57 | +2 |
| 8 | FC Volendam | 49 | 34 | 14 | 7 | 13 | 63 | 66 | -3 |
| 9 | FC Eindhoven | 48 | 34 | 14 | 6 | 14 | 64 | 73 | -9 |
| 10 | ADO Den Haag | 45 | 34 | 12 | 9 | 13 | 52 | 52 | 0 |
| 11 | VVV-Venlo | 42 | 34 | 12 | 6 | 16 | 59 | 66 | -7 |
| 12 | RBC Roosendaal | 40 | 34 | 11 | 7 | 16 | 54 | 65 | -11 |
| 13 | BV Veendam | 39 | 34 | 11 | 6 | 17 | 47 | 54 | -7 |
| 14 | Dordrecht '90 | 38 | 34 | 11 | 5 | 18 | 51 | 66 | -15 |
| 15 | HFC Haarlem | 38 | 34 | 9 | 11 | 14 | 45 | 67 | -22 |
| 16 | TOP Oss | 37 | 34 | 9 | 10 | 15 | 43 | 50 | -7 |
| 17 | Heracles Almelo | 34 | 34 | 9 | 7 | 18 | 37 | 58 | -21 |
| 18 | SC Telstar | 26 | 34 | 5 | 11 | 18 | 45 | 71 | -26 |

- Promoted : FC Den Bosch
- Promotion / relegation play-offs ("Nacompetitie"): FC Groningen, Emmen, Helmond Sport, Zwolle, Excelsior and Dordrecht '90

=== Topscorers ===
| Position | Player | Nationality | Club | Goals |
|---|---|---|---|---|
| 1 | Harry van der Laan | (Netherlands) | FC Den Bosch | 30 |
| 2 | Peter Hofstede | (Netherlands) | Helmond Sport / FC Emmen | 22 |
| 3 | Maurice Graef | (Netherlands) | VVV-Venlo | 17 |
| 4 | Marco Boogers | (Netherlands) | FC Volendam | 16 |
| – | John Lammers | (Netherlands) | RBC Roosendaal | 16 |
| – | Bert Zuurman | (Netherlands) | FC Eindhoven | 16 |
| 7 | Silvan Inia | (Netherlands) | FC Volendam | 15 |

== Promotion and relegation ==
=== Group A ===
| Position | Team | Points | Played | Won | Drawn | Lost | For | Against | Difference |
|---|---|---|---|---|---|---|---|---|---|
| 1 | RKC Waalwijk | 16 | 6 | 5 | 1 | 0 | 11 | 3 | +8 |
| 2 | FC Zwolle | 8 | 6 | 2 | 2 | 2 | 8 | 10 | -2 |
| 3 | Dordrecht '90 | 7 | 6 | 2 | 1 | 3 | 12 | 13 | -1 |
| 4 | FC Emmen | 3 | 6 | 1 | 0 | 5 | 10 | 15 | -5 |

=== Group B ===
| Position | Team | Points | Played | Won | Drawn | Lost | For | Against | Difference |
|---|---|---|---|---|---|---|---|---|---|
| 1 | Sparta Rotterdam | 15 | 6 | 5 | 0 | 1 | 19 | 6 | +13 |
| 2 | FC Groningen | 13 | 6 | 4 | 1 | 1 | 16 | 8 | +8 |
| 3 | Excelsior Rotterdam | 7 | 6 | 2 | 1 | 3 | 16 | 18 | -2 |
| 4 | Helmond Sport | 0 | 6 | 0 | 0 | 6 | 5 | 24 | -19 |

- Stayed : RKC Waalwijk and Sparta Rotterdam

== KNVB Cup ==
Quarter-finals
March 9
FC Eindhoven | 0
PSV Eindhoven | 5
March 9
Fortuna Sittard | 3
FC Emmen | 1
March 10
Feyenoord Rotterdam | 2
Vitesse Arnhem | 1
March 24
FC Zwolle | 1
Ajax Amsterdam | 2

Semi-finals
April 13
PSV Eindhoven | 1
Fortuna Sittard | 3
April 14
Ajax Amsterdam | 2
Feyenoord Rotterdam | 1

Final
May 13 - Rotterdam
Ajax Amsterdam | 2
Fortuna Sittard | 0

=== Final ===
May 13, 1999

| Ajax | 2–0 (2–0) | Fortuna Sittard |
|---|---|---|
| Gronkjaer 12', 15' |

De Kuip, Rotterdam
Attendance: 25.000
Referee: Uilenberg
