= 1998–99 Feyenoord season =

Feyenoord
1998–99 season
- Chairman: Jorien van den Herik
- Manager: Leo Beenhakker
- Stadium: De Kuip
- Eredivisie: 1st
- KNVB Cup: Semi-finals
- UEFA Cup: Quarter-finals
Home colours

During the 1998–99 Dutch football season, Feyenoord competed in the Eredivisie.

== Season summary ==
Feyenoord won the Eredivisie with a comfortable 15-point margin over runners-up Willem II. This was their last Dutch league title until 2017.

== First-team squad ==
Note: Flags indicate national team as defined under FIFA eligibility rules; some limited exceptions apply. Players may hold more than one non-FIFA nationality.

No.	Pos.	Nation	Player
1	GK	POL	Jerzy Dudek
2	DF	GHA	Christian Gyan
3	MF	URU	Fernando Picun
4	DF	NED	Bernard Schuiteman
5	MF	NED	Jean-Paul van Gastel (captain)
6	MF	NED	Paul Bosvelt
7	MF	CIV	Bonaventure Kalou
8	DF	NED	Kees van Wonderen
9	FW	ARG	Julio Ricardo Cruz
10	FW	DEN	Jon Dahl Tomasson
11	FW	NED	Henk Vos
13	MF	BRA	Tininho

No.	Pos.	Nation	Player
14	FW	NED	Peter van Vossen
15	DF	ARG	Patricio Graff
16	DF	NED	Bert Konterman
17	DF	NED	Patrick Paauwe
18	MF	RUS	Igor Korneev
20	DF	NED	Ferry de Haan
21	GK	NED	Edwin Zoetebier
22	DF	NED	Ulrich van Gobbel
23	DF	NED	Henk Fräser
24	FW	NED	Robin Nelisse
25	DF	GHA	Patrick Allotey
26	GK	NED	Ronald Graafland
27	DF	NED	René Bot
28	FW	BEL	Thomas Buffel
29	MF	NED	Kelly Rietbroek
30	MF	NED	Rene van Dieren
31	MF	POL	Euzebiusz Smolarek

== Results ==
=== UEFA Cup ===
==== First round ====
15 September 1998	Stuttgart (Germany)	1–3	(Netherlands) Feyenoord	Stuttgart
	Bobic 31'	Report	Van Gastel 19'; Tomasson 21', 32'

29 September 1998	Feyenoord (Netherlands)	0–3 (3–4 agg.)	(Germany) Stuttgart	Rotterdam
		Report	Balakov 35'; Đorđević 70'; Bobic 90'

== Transfers ==
=== In ===
- Jon Dahl Tomasson - Newcastle United, July
