= 2001–02 in Dutch football =

The 2001–02 season in Dutch football was the 46th season in the Eredivisie, where Ajax claimed the double (the Eredivisie title and KNVB Cup).

== Johan Cruijff-schaal ==
August 12, 2001

| PSV | 3–2 | Twente |
|---|---|---|
| Kežman 4'; Bruggink 10'; Rommedahl 71' | | De Witte 34'; Van der Doelen 89' |

Amsterdam Arena, Amsterdam
Attendance: 32,500
Referee: Roelof Luinge

== Eredivisie ==
| Position | Team | Points | Played | Won | Drawn | Lost | For | Against | Difference |
|---|---|---|---|---|---|---|---|---|---|
| 1 | Ajax | 73 | 34 | 22 | 7 | 5 | 73 | 34 | +39 |
| 2 | PSV | 68 | 34 | 20 | 8 | 6 | 77 | 32 | +45 |
| 3 | Feyenoord | 64 | 34 | 19 | 7 | 8 | 68 | 29 | +39 |
| 4 | Heerenveen | 60 | 34 | 17 | 9 | 8 | 57 | 27 | +30 |
| 5 | Vitesse | 60 | 34 | 16 | 12 | 6 | 45 | 34 | +12 |
| 6 | NAC Breda | 54 | 34 | 15 | 9 | 10 | 55 | 52 | +3 |
| 7 | Utrecht | 51 | 34 | 14 | 9 | 11 | 60 | 51 | +9 |
| 8 | RKC Waalwijk | 48 | 34 | 14 | 6 | 14 | 49 | 44 | +5 |
| 9 | NEC | 45 | 34 | 13 | 6 | 15 | 38 | 59 | -21 |
| 10 | AZ | 43 | 34 | 12 | 7 | 15 | 43 | 45 | -2 |
| 11 | Willem II | 43 | 34 | 10 | 13 | 11 | 54 | 61 | -7 |
| 12 | Twente | 42 | 34 | 10 | 12 | 12 | 41 | 41 | 0 |
| 13 | Roda JC | 41 | 34 | 11 | 8 | 15 | 33 | 45 | -12 |
| 14 | De Graafschap | 37 | 34 | 10 | 7 | 17 | 43 | 55 | -12 |
| 15 | Groningen | 37 | 34 | 10 | 7 | 17 | 40 | 59 | -19 |
| 16 | FC Den Bosch | 33 | 34 | 8 | 9 | 17 | 40 | 55 | -15 |
| 17 | Sparta Rotterdam | 24 | 34 | 4 | 12 | 18 | 26 | 75 | -49 |
| 18 | Fortuna Sittard | 17 | 34 | 3 | 8 | 23 | 27 | 71 | -44 |

- Champions League : Ajax and PSV
- Champions League qualification : Feyenoord
- UEFA Cup : Heerenveen, Vitesse and Utrecht
- Promotion / relegation play-offs ("Nacompetitie") : FC Den Bosch and Sparta Rotterdam
- Relegated : Fortuna Sittard

=== Top scorers ===
| Position | Player | Nationality | Club | Goals |
|---|---|---|---|---|
| 1 | Pierre van Hooijdonk | (Netherlands) | Feyenoord | 24 |
| 2 | Jan Vennegoor of Hesselink | (Netherlands) | PSV | 22 |
| 3 | Jon Dahl Tomasson | (Denmark) | Feyenoord | 17 |
| 4 | Denny Landzaat | (Netherlands) | Willem II | 16 |
| 5 | Marcus Allbäck | (Sweden) | Heerenveen | 15 |
| – | Mateja Kežman | (Federal Republic of Yugoslavia) | PSV | 15 |
| 7 | Bart Van Den Eede | (Belgium) | FC Den Bosch | 14 |
| – | Igor Gluščević | (Federal Republic of Yugoslavia) | Utrecht | 14 |
| – | Rafael van der Vaart | (Netherlands) | Ajax | 14 |

=== Awards ===
==== Dutch Footballer of the Year ====
- 2001–02 — Pierre van Hooijdonk (Feyenoord)

==== Dutch Golden Shoe Winner ====
- 2001 — Johann Vogel (PSV)
- 2002 — Cristian Chivu (Ajax)

=== Ajax winning squad 2001–02 ===
Goal

- (Australia) Joey Didulica
- (Netherlands) Fred Grim
- (Romania) Bogdan Lobonț

Defence

- (Norway) André Bergdølmo
- (Romania) Cristian Chivu
- (Netherlands) Tim de Cler
- (Netherlands) John Heitinga
- (United States) John O'Brien
- (Finland) Petri Pasanen
- (Netherlands) Mitchell Piqué
- (Tunisia) Hatem Trabelsi
- (Netherlands) Ferdi Vierklau
- (Ghana) Abubakari Yakubu

Midfield

- (Colombia) Daniel Cruz
- (Czech Republic) Tomáš Galásek
- (Netherlands) Cedric van der Gun
- (Netherlands) Jan van Halst
- (Netherlands) Richard Knopper
- (Brazil) Maxwell
- (South Africa) Steven Pienaar
- (Netherlands) Stefano Seedorf
- (Netherlands) Rafael van der Vaart
- (Netherlands) Richard Witschge

Attack

- (Georgia (country)) Shota Arveladze
- (Egypt) Mido
- (Sweden) Zlatan Ibrahimović
- (Nigeria) Pius Ikedia
- (Greece) Nikos Machlas
- (Netherlands) Andy van der Meyde
- (Brazil) Wamberto

Management

- (Netherlands) Co Adriaanse (Coach)
- (Netherlands) Peter Boeve (Assistant)

During the season replaced by:

- (Netherlands) Ronald Koeman (Coach)
- (Netherlands) Ruud Krol (Assistant)
- (Netherlands) Tonny Bruins Slot (Assistant)

== Eerste Divisie ==
| Position | Team | Points | Played | Won | Drawn | Lost | For | Against | Difference |
|---|---|---|---|---|---|---|---|---|---|
| 1 | Zwolle | 73 | 34 | 22 | 7 | 5 | 65 | 36 | +29 |
| 2 | Excelsior | 70 | 34 | 21 | 7 | 6 | 73 | 31 | +42 |
| 3 | RBC Roosendaal | 68 | 34 | 21 | 5 | 8 | 76 | 40 | +36 |
| 4 | ADO Den Haag | 63 | 34 | 18 | 9 | 7 | 53 | 36 | +17 |
| 5 | Emmen | 59 | 34 | 17 | 8 | 9 | 53 | 43 | +10 |
| 6 | Volendam | 53 | 34 | 15 | 8 | 11 | 66 | 48 | +18 |
| 7 | Cambuur | 51 | 34 | 15 | 6 | 13 | 50 | 42 | +8 |
| 8 | Heracles Almelo | 48 | 34 | 14 | 6 | 14 | 52 | 51 | +1 |
| 9 | Stormvogels Telstar | 45 | 34 | 12 | 9 | 13 | 55 | 49 | +6 |
| 10 | Dordrecht '90 | 45 | 34 | 12 | 9 | 13 | 66 | 66 | 0 |
| 11 | Veendam | 45 | 34 | 13 | 6 | 15 | 60 | 62 | -2 |
| 12 | HFC Haarlem | 38 | 34 | 10 | 8 | 16 | 37 | 46 | -9 |
| 13 | VVV-Venlo | 38 | 34 | 11 | 5 | 18 | 51 | 64 | -13 |
| 14 | MVV Maastricht | 37 | 34 | 10 | 7 | 17 | 49 | 61 | -12 |
| 15 | Helmond Sport | 37 | 34 | 8 | 13 | 13 | 34 | 51 | -17 |
| 16 | Go Ahead Eagles | 36 | 34 | 9 | 9 | 16 | 48 | 62 | -14 |
| 17 | FC Eindhoven | 32 | 34 | 8 | 7 | 19 | 52 | 77 | -25 |
| 18 | TOP Oss | 14 | 34 | 3 | 5 | 26 | 25 | 100 | -75 |

- Promoted : Zwolle
- Promotion / Relegation play-offs ("Nacompetitie") : Excelsior, RBC, ADO, Emmen, Volendam and Cambuur

=== Top scorers ===
| Position | Player | Nationality | Club | Goals |
|---|---|---|---|---|
| 1 | Ivan Cvetkov | (Bulgaria) | Veendam | 22 |
| 2 | Geert den Ouden | (Netherlands) | RBC Roosendaal | 20 |
| – | Laurens ten Heuvel | (Netherlands) | Stormvogels Telstar | 20 |
| – | Bernard Hofstede | (Netherlands) | VVV-Venlo | 20 |
| 5 | Roy Stroeve | (Netherlands) | Heracles Almelo | 17 |
| 6 | Emiel van Eijkeren | (Netherlands) | ADO Den Haag | 16 |
| – | Jan Bruin | (Netherlands) | Cambuur Leeuwarden | 16 |
| – | Marco Boogers | (Netherlands) | Dordrecht '90 | 16 |
| – | Mark de Vries | (Netherlands) | Dordrecht '90 | 16 |

== Promotion and relegation ==
=== Group A ===
| Position | Team | Points | Played | Won | Drawn | Lost | For | Against | Difference |
|---|---|---|---|---|---|---|---|---|---|
| 1 | RBC Roosendaal | 14 | 6 | 4 | 2 | 0 | 15 | 6 | +9 |
| 2 | FC Den Bosch | 13 | 6 | 4 | 1 | 1 | 17 | 9 | +8 |
| 3 | Emmen | 4 | 6 | 1 | 1 | 4 | 10 | 15 | -5 |
| 4 | Cambuur | 3 | 6 | 1 | 0 | 5 | 8 | 20 | -12 |

=== Group B ===
| Position | Team | Points | Played | Won | Drawn | Lost | For | Against | Difference |
|---|---|---|---|---|---|---|---|---|---|
| 1 | Excelsior | 10 | 6 | 3 | 1 | 2 | 10 | 8 | +2 |
| 2 | Volendam | 9 | 6 | 3 | 0 | 3 | 10 | 14 | -4 |
| 3 | ADO Den Haag | 8 | 6 | 2 | 2 | 2 | 13 | 9 | +4 |
| 4 | Sparta Rotterdam | 7 | 6 | 2 | 1 | 3 | 10 | 12 | -2 |

- Promoted : RBC Roosendaal and Excelsior
- Relegated : FC Den Bosch and Sparta Rotterdam

== KNVB Cup ==
Quarter-finals
January 30
Utrecht | 3
Heerenveen | 1
February 7
Ajax II | 3
Stormvogels Telstar | 0
January 30
PSV | 1 (7)
Feyenoord | 1 (6)
February 7
Ajax I | 4
Groningen | 0

Semi-finals
March 29
Ajax II | 2 (6)
Utrecht | 2 (7)
April 10
Ajax I | 3
PSV | 0

Final
May 12 – Rotterdam
Ajax I | 3
Utrecht | 2

== See also ==
- Sparta Rotterdam season 2001–02
