= Michael Mols =

Dutch footballer (born 1970)

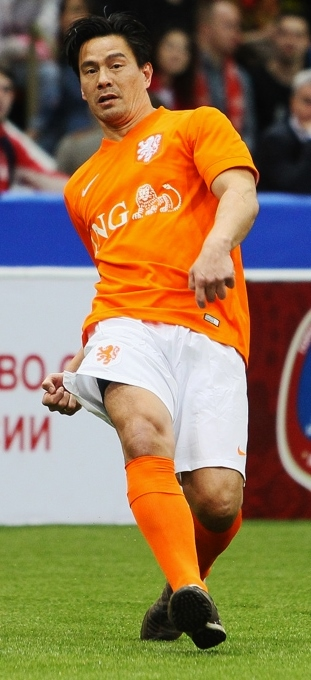
- Mols before a game with the Netherlands

Personal information
- Full name: Michael Alexander Mols
- Date of birth: 17 December 1970 (age 55)
- Place of birth: Amsterdam, Netherlands
- Height: 1.78 m (5 ft 10 in)
- Position: Striker

Youth career
- Geuzenveld
- Eendracht '82
- Blauw Wit
- 1984–1990: Ajax

Senior career*
Years	Team	Apps	(Gls)
1990–1991	Ajax	0	(0)
1991–1993	Cambuur	43	(13)
1993–1996	Twente	107	(26)
1996–1999	Utrecht	94	(49)
1999–2004	Rangers	98	(38)
2004–2005	Utrecht	14	(1)
2005–2007	ADO Den Haag	60	(8)
2007–2009	Feyenoord	39	(4)
Total		455	(139)

International career
1995–1999	Netherlands	6	(0)
- * Club domestic league appearances and goals

Michael Alexander Mols (born 17 December 1970) is a Dutch former professional footballer who played as a striker.

== Club career ==
Born in Amsterdam to Indo (Eurasian) parents, Mols, a product of local Ajax's youth system, never appeared officially for its first team, making his professional debuts in the second division, with Cambuur, which he helped obtain Eredivisie promotion in 1992. Early into the following year, he signed with another club in the top level, Twente, continuing to score regularly with this and his following team, Utrecht.

In the 1999 summer, Mols signed for Scottish side Rangers, scoring nine times in his first nine Scottish Premier League matches. However, during a UEFA Champions League clash against Bayern Munich, he collided with opposing goalkeeper Oliver Kahn, which resulted in a serious knee injury – in the same competition, he previously helped his club crush PSV Eindhoven 4–1 at home by scoring twice, whilst in the league, he put four past former Ranger Andy Goram's Motherwell.

Mols made his return from the injury on 9 September 2000 in a league game against Dundee. In the following years, Mols endured a tough rehabilitation process, eventually recovering fully and scoring 13 times in 27 matches during the 2002–03 championship-winning season, which earned him a one-year extension in his contract. In December 2002, he notably scored the winner in the Old Firm contest against Celtic (3–2), and left club and country in June 2004, having collected a total of five trophies. He got sent off on his final appearance for Rangers against Dunfermline.

After an unassuming year with Utrecht, Mols signed with ADO Den Haag, where he played two seasons and netted eight league goals combined. At the end of 2006–07, as his side relegated to the second division, he decided to retire, at almost 37.

However, after sacking agent Mark Brandon, he later reconsidered: He began his attempt to find a new club with an unsuccessful trial with Australian club Perth Glory, before he signed a one-year deal with Feyenoord, as cover for also recently signed Roy Makaay. He retired for good at the end of 2008–09 (18 matches, two goals).

== International career ==
During a four-year span, Mols won six caps for the Netherlands, the first coming on 18 January 1995 in a 1–0 friendly defeat to France, in Utrecht.

== Honours ==
Rangers

- Scottish League: 1999–2000, 2002–03
- Scottish Cup: 2001–02, 2002–03
- Scottish League Cup: 2001–02, 2002–03

Feyenoord

- Dutch Cup: 2007–08

Individual

- Dutch Golden Shoe: 1999
