= Campbell Ogilvie =

Scottish football executive

Campbell Ogilvie (born 1950 or 1951) is a Scottish football executive. He was the President of the Scottish Football Association, a director of Rangers and managing director of Heart of Midlothian (Hearts).

== Career ==
Ogilvie was appointed assistant secretary of the Scottish Football League. in May 1970. In 1978, he was hired as general secretary at Rangers F.C. and in 1989 he became a director of that club. Ogilvie relinquished his executive duties at Ibrox Stadium in September 2005, following a boardroom re-shuffle.

Ogilvie joined Heart of Midlothian in November 2005 to undertake similar duties under the title "Operations Director". Ogilvie was later promoted to managing director on 14 March 2008. Oglivie held 3505 shares in Rangers FC while a senior manager at Hearts.

In June 2003, Ogilvie became the treasurer, now second vice-president, of the Scottish Football Association (SFA). On 1 June 2007, Ogilvie became first vice-president of the SFA, with Alan McRae taking his place as second vice-president. On 8 June 2011 it was confirmed that Ogilvie would take up the presidency of the Scottish Football Association, succeeding George Peat. He relinquished the post in June 2015, when he was succeeded by Alan McRae.

In March 2012 Ogilvie stated that he was a member of the Employee Benefit Trust scheme at Rangers when he was both a Director of Rangers as well as the treasurer of the Scottish Football Association.
