= 1999–2000 in Dutch football =

The 1999–2000 season in Dutch football was the 44th season in the Eredivisie. PSV Eindhoven won the title, while Roda JC won the Dutch National Cup.

== Johan Cruijff-schaal ==
August 8, 1999

Feyenoord	3–2	Ajax
Tomasson 13'; Kalou 15'; Paauwe 86'		Knopper 45'; Gronkjaer 51'

Amsterdam ArenA, Amsterdam
Attendance: 44.500
Referee: Luinge

== Eredivisie ==
Pos	Team	Pld	W	D	L	GF	GA	GD	Pts	Qualification or relegation
1	PSV (C)	34	27	3	4	105	24	+81	84	Qualification to Champions League group stage
2	Heerenveen	34	21	5	8	65	36	+29	68	Qualification to Champions League group stage
3	Feyenoord	34	18	10	6	66	42	+24	64	Qualification to Champions League third qualifying round
4	Vitesse Arnhem	34	18	9	7	67	43	+24	63	Qualification to UEFA Cup first round (Note: Roda JC qualified for the UEFA Cup by winning the 1999–2000 KNVB Cup.)
5	Ajax	34	18	7	9	72	51	+21	61	Qualification to UEFA Cup first round
6	FC Twente	34	16	12	6	57	37	+20	60	
7	AZ	34	17	4	13	69	59	+10	55	
8	Roda JC	34	16	7	11	62	53	+9	55	Qualification to UEFA Cup first round
9	Willem II	34	13	9	12	55	65	−10	48	
10	FC Utrecht	34	14	4	16	55	61	−6	46	
11	RKC Waalwijk	34	12	6	16	44	67	−23	42	Qualification to Intertoto Cup third round
12	Fortuna Sittard	34	10	8	16	47	54	−7	38	
13	Sparta Rotterdam	34	11	4	19	48	75	−27	37	
14	De Graafschap	34	8	9	17	41	60	−19	33	
15	NEC	34	7	6	21	35	62	−27	27	
16	MVV (R)	34	6	7	21	38	68	−30	25	Qualification to Relegation play-offs (Note: MVV and Cambuur both relegated after losing their promotion/relegation play-offs.)
17	Cambuur (R)	34	6	7	21	35	66	−31	25	Qualification to Relegation play-offs
18	Den Bosch (R)	34	4	11	19	36	74	−38	23	Relegation to Eerste Divisie

Rules for classification: 1) Points; 2) Goal difference; 3) Goals scored; 4) Head-to-head points; 5) Head-to-head goal difference; 6) Head-to-head away goals scored; 7) Play-off if relevant for deciding champion, relegation or participating in a European league, otherwise by draw. 8) Penalty shoot-out (only after a play-off)
(C) Champions; (R) Relegated

=== Topscorers ===
Position	Player	Nat.	Club	Goals
1	Ruud van Nistelrooy	(Netherlands)	PSV	29
2	Pierre van Hooijdonk	(Netherlands)	Vitesse	25
3	Arnold Bruggink	(Netherlands)	PSV	19
3	Jan Vennegoor of Hesselink	(Netherlands)	FC Twente	19
5	Luc Nilis	(Belgium)	PSV	18
5	Anthony Lurling	(Netherlands)	SC Heerenveen	18
7	John Bosman	(Netherlands)	AZ	17
8	Julio Ricardo Cruz	(Argentina)	Feyenoord	15
8	Bob Peeters	(Belgium)	Roda JC	15
10	Richard Knopper	(Netherlands)	Ajax	14
10	Nikos Machlas	(Greece)	Ajax	14

=== PSV Winning Squad 1999-2000 ===
Goal

- (Federal Republic of Yugoslavia) Ivica Kralj
- (Netherlands) Patrick Lodewijks
- (Netherlands) Ronald Waterreus

Defence

- (Ghana) Eric Addo
- (Denmark) Kasper Bøgelund
- (Netherlands) Jürgen Dirkx
- (Netherlands) Ernest Faber
- (Denmark) Jan Heintze
- (Russia) Yuri Nikiforov
- (Netherlands) André Ooijer
- (Lithuania) Andrei Skerla
- (Netherlands) Stan Valckx
- (Netherlands) Chris van der Weerden
- (Netherlands) Rob Wielaert

Midfield

- (Netherlands) Mark van Bommel
- (Netherlands) Wilfred Bouma
- (Netherlands) Björn van der Doelen
- (Poland) Tomek Iwan
- (Russia) Dmitri Khokhlov
- (Finland) Joonas Kolkka
- (Denmark) Dennis Rommedahl
- (Romania) Ovidiu Stinga
- (Switzerland) Johann Vogel

Attack

- (Netherlands) Björn Becker
- (Netherlands) Arnold Bruggink
- (Belgium) Luc Nilis
- (Netherlands) Ruud van Nistelrooy
- (Netherlands) Johan Pater

Management

- (Belgium) Eric Gerets (Coach)
- (Netherlands) Ernie Brandts (Assistant)

== Eerste Divisie ==
Pos	Team	Pld	W	D	L	GF	GA	GD	Pts	Promotion or qualification
1	NAC Breda	34	27	1	6	84	36	+48	82	Promotion to Eredivisie
2	FC Zwolle	34	22	8	4	90	41	+49	74	Play-offs
3	FC Groningen	34	23	5	6	81	33	+48	74	Play-offs
4	Excelsior	34	18	5	11	70	48	+22	59	Play-offs
5	FC Emmen	34	18	4	12	53	45	+8	58	Play-offs
6	RBC Roosendaal	34	17	6	11	65	49	+16	57	Play-offs
7	Heracles Almelo	34	13	8	13	41	42	−1	47	Play-offs
8	Dordrecht '90	34	12	9	13	55	58	−3	45	
9	FC Eindhoven	34	14	3	17	47	63	−16	45	
10	Helmond Sport	34	13	3	18	45	57	−12	42	
11	ADO Den Haag	34	12	6	16	37	52	−15	42	
12	Veendam	34	10	11	13	50	61	−11	41	
13	Telstar	34	11	4	19	44	59	−15	37	
14	Go Ahead Eagles	34	9	9	16	56	58	−2	36	
15	VVV-Venlo	34	8	11	15	38	62	−24	35	
16	HFC Haarlem	34	9	5	20	54	72	−18	32	
17	FC Volendam	34	8	7	19	40	75	−35	31	
18	TOP Oss	34	8	3	23	35	74	−39	27	

Source: rsssf.com
- Promoted : NAC
- Promotion / Relegation play-offs ("Nacompetitie") : FC Zwolle, FC Groningen, Excelsior, Emmen, RBC and Heracles

== Promotion and relegation ==
=== Group A ===
Pos	Team	Pld	W	D	L	GF	GA	GD	Pts	Promotion or relegation
1	FC Groningen	6	5	0	1	19	7	+12	15	Promotion to Eredivisie
2	FC Emmen	6	2	2	2	8	10	−2	8	
3	MVV	6	2	1	3	11	14	−3	7	Relegation from Eredivisie
4	Heracles Almelo	6	1	1	4	10	17	−7	4	

=== Group B ===
Pos	Team	Pld	W	D	L	GF	GA	GD	Pts	Promotion or relegation
1	RBC Roosendaal	6	3	2	1	10	7	+3	11	Promotion to Eredivisie
2	FC Zwolle	6	3	1	2	14	7	+7	10	
3	Excelsior	6	2	1	3	11	14	−3	7	
4	Cambuur Leeuwarden	6	1	2	3	6	13	−7	5	Relegation from Eredivisie

Source: rsssf.com
- Promoted : FC Groningen and RBC Roosendaal
- Relegated : MVV Maastricht and Cambuur Leeuwarden

== KNVB Cup ==
Quarter-finals
February 16
FC Utrecht	0
Roda JC	1
February 16
RKC	0
Vitesse	1
February 16
NEC	2
FC Dordrecht	0
February 17
Willem II	1
AZ	2

Semi-finals
April 12
Vitesse	0
Roda JC	1
April 11
AZ	1 (1)
NEC	1 (4)

Final
May 21 - Rotterdam
Roda JC	2
NEC	0
