= 2003–04 in Dutch football =

The 2003–04 season in Dutch football saw Ajax regain their title in the Eredivisie. Zwolle were relegated to the First Division.

== Johan Cruyff Shield ==
August 10, 2003

PSV	3–1	Utrecht
Robben 14'; Van Bommel 47'; Kežman 89'		Van de Haar 22'

Amsterdam Arena, Amsterdam
Attendance: 32,000
Referee: Haverkort

== Eredivisie ==
=== Awards ===
==== Dutch Footballer of the Year ====
- 2003–04 — Maxwell (Ajax)

==== Dutch Golden Shoe Winner ====
- 2003 — Dirk Kuyt (Utrecht)
- 2004 — Maxwell (Ajax)

=== Ajax squad 2003–04 ===
Goal

- (Netherlands) Sander Boschker
- (Romania) Bogdan Lobonț
- (Netherlands) Maarten Stekelenburg

Defence

- (Belgium) Jelle Van Damme
- (France) Julien Escudé
- (Czech Republic) Zdeněk Grygera
- (Netherlands) John Heitinga
- (Netherlands) Nigel de Jong
- (United States) John O'Brien
- (Finland) Petri Pasanen
- (Tunisia) Hatem Trabelsi
- (Belgium) Thomas Vermaelen
- (Brazil) Fronio Walker
- (Ghana) Abubakari Yakubu

Midfield

- (Czech Republic) Tomáš Galásek
- (Netherlands) Cedric van der Gun
- (Finland) Jari Litmanen
- (Brazil) Maxwell
- (Ghana) Anthony Obodai
- (South Africa) Steven Pienaar
- (Netherlands) Stefano Seedorf
- (Netherlands) Wesley Sneijder
- (Netherlands) Rafael van der Vaart

Attack

- (Netherlands) Jamal Akachar
- (Greece) Yannis Anastasiou
- (Netherlands) Ryan Babel
- (Morocco) Nourdin Boukhari
- (Australia) Jason Culina
- (Sweden) Zlatan Ibrahimović
- (Romania) Nicolae Mitea
- (Belgium) Tom De Mul
- (Netherlands) Daniël de Ridder
- (Netherlands) Victor Sikora
- (Belgium) Tom Soetaers
- (Belgium) Wesley Sonck
- (Brazil) Wamberto

Management

- (Netherlands) Ronald Koeman (Coach)
- (Netherlands) Ruud Krol (Assistant)
- (Netherlands) Tonny Bruins Slot (Assistant)

== Eerste Divisie ==
Position	Team	Points	Played	Won	Drawn	Lost	For	Against	Difference
1	FC Den Bosch	74	36	22	8	6	85	48	+37
2	Excelsior	74	36	22	8	6	70	39	+31
3	Sparta Rotterdam	69	36	21	6	9	76	43	+33
4	Heracles Almelo	67	36	19	10	7	71	42	+29
5	Helmond Sport	65	36	19	8	9	66	42	+24
6	De Graafschap	64	36	18	10	8	63	43	+20
7	VVV-Venlo	61	36	19	4	13	76	62	+14
8	Emmen	61	36	17	10	9	65	54	+11
9	Go Ahead Eagles	53	36	15	8	13	79	63	+16
10	AGOVV Apeldoorn	50	36	14	8	14	63	54	+9
11	TOP Oss	45	36	12	9	15	57	60	-3
12	Stormvogels Telstar	44	36	10	9	17	55	62	-7
13	HFC Haarlem	39	36	10	9	17	41	63	-22
14	BV Veendam	36	36	7	15	14	46	71	-25
15	Dordrecht	30	36	5	15	16	33	60	-27
16	FC Eindhoven	30	36	6	12	18	40	69	-26
17	Cambuur	28	36	6	10	20	35	65	-30
18	MVV Maastricht	28	36	6	10	20	32	70	-38
19	Fortuna Sittard	19	36	3	10	23	38	81	-43

- Promoted : FC Den Bosch
- Promotion / relegation play-offs ("Nacompetitie"): Excelsior, Sparta, Heracles, Helmond Sport, De Graafschap and VVV Venlo

=== Topscorers ===
Position	Player	Nationality	Club	Goals
1	Klaas-Jan Huntelaar	(Netherlands)	AGOVV Apeldoorn	26
2	Stefan Jansen	(Netherlands)	FC Den Bosch	25
3	Yuri Rose	(Netherlands)	Heracles Almelo	22
4	Ronald Hamming	(Netherlands)	BV Veendam	21
5	Uğur Yıldırım	(Netherlands)	Go Ahead Eagles	19
6	Mounir El Hamdaoui	(Morocco)	Excelsior	17
	Ricky van den Bergh	(Netherlands)	Sparta Rotterdam	17

== Promotion and relegation ==
=== Group A ===
Position	Team	Points	Played	Won	Drawn	Lost	For	Against	Difference
1	Vitesse	14	6	4	2	0	14	4	+10
2	VVV-Venlo	8	6	2	2	2	11	10	+1
3	Sparta Rotterdam	6	6	1	3	2	8	10	-2
4	Helmond Sport	3	6	0	3	3	7	16	-9

=== Group B ===
Position	Team	Points	Played	Won	Drawn	Lost	For	Against	Difference
1	De Graafschap	13	6	4	1	1	10	4	+6
2	Heracles Almelo	11	6	3	2	1	11	6	+5
3	Excelsior	8	6	2	2	2	8	8	0
4	Volendam	1	6	0	1	5	4	15	-11

- Stayed / Promoted : Vitesse Arnhem and De Graafschap
- Relegated: Volendam

== KNVB Cup ==
Quarter-finals
February 4
PSV	0
NAC Breda	1
February 4
Twente	3
Feyenoord	1
February 3
Sparta	0 (3)
NEC	0 (2)
February 4
Utrecht	3
Heracles Almelo	2

Semi-finals
March 16
Twente	2 (4)
NAC Breda	2 (3)
March 17
Sparta	3 (3)
Utrecht	3 (4)

Final
May 23 - Rotterdam
Twente	0
Utrecht	1

== See also ==
- Sparta Rotterdam season 2003–04
