= Raoul Henar =

Dutch footballer

Personal information
- Date of birth: 4 August 1972 (age 54)
- Place of birth: Paramaribo, Suriname
- Height: 1.83 m (6 ft 0 in)
- Position: Striker

Youth career
- Zeeburgia
- Zwarte Schapen

Senior career*
Years	Team	Apps	(Gls)
1997–1999	Telstar	67	(27)
1999–2000	Veendam	30	(6)
2000–2002	Helmond Sport	67	(30)
2002–2003	Volendam	20	(1)
Total		184	(64)
- * Club domestic league appearances and goals

Raoul Henar (born 4 August 1972) is a Dutch-Surinamese retired footballer who played as a forward for Eerste Divisie and Eredivisie clubs Stormvogels Telstar, SC Veendam, Helmond Sport and FC Volendam between 1997 and 2004.

After retiring professionally, he played for amateur sides Omniworld, Sparta Nijkerk, Kozakken Boys, Alphense Boys and Elinkwijk, whom he joined from SDC Putten in 2010.

== Personal life ==
He moved with his wife to live near Antwerp, Belgium in 2016.
