= Jaromír Šimr =

Czech footballer (born 1979)

Personal information
- Date of birth: 31 January 1979 (age 47)
- Place of birth: Plzeň, Czechoslovakia
- Height: 1.77 m (5 ft 10 in)
- Position: Midfielder

Youth career
- 1984–1995: Viktoria Plzeň
- 1995–1999: Feyenoord

Senior career*
Years	Team	Apps	(Gls)
1999	RKC Waalwijk	0	(0)
1999–2001	Excelsior	61	(20)
2001–2004	NEC	90	(6)
2005–2006	Amica Wronki	35	(0)
2006–2007	Excelsior	30	(3)
2007	Viktoria Plzeň	1	(0)
2008–2011	Senco Doubravka		
2011–2013	Spartak Chrást		
2013–2014	Slavoj Kolovec		
2014–2015	Plzen Bukovec		

International career
1995	Czech Republic U16	5	(5)
- * Club domestic league appearances and goals

Jaromír Šimr (born 31 January 1979), known in the Netherlands as Jarda Šimr, is a Czech former professional footballer who played as a midfielder.

== Career ==
Born in Plzeň, Šimr began his career in the youth system of local side Viktoria Plzeň, before moving to Feyenoord's youth academy in 1995.

After a move to RKC Waalwijk (without making a senior appearance), he would eventually make his senior league debut on 14 August 1999, for Excelsior, against Go Ahead Eagles. Over the following two seasons, he became a key player and this led to a move to NEC Nijmegen.

In 2003, he scored the goal to take NEC into the UEFA Cup (qualifying for Europe through their league position for the first time).

After leaving NEC, he played for Polish side Amica Wronki, then returned for a single season with Excelsior, before winding down his career at three Plzeň clubs: Viktoria, Senco Doubravka, Spartak Chrast, Slavoj Kolovec and finally Plzeň Bukovec, where he ended his playing career in 2014.
