= Tininho =

Brazilian footballer

Personal information
- Full name: Ronildo Pereira de Freitas
- Date of birth: 23 October 1977 (age 49)
- Place of birth: Montes Claros, Brazil
- Height: 1.82 m (6 ft 0 in)
- Positions: Midfielder; defender

Youth career
- Portuguesa
- Lierse

Senior career*
Years	Team	Apps	(Gls)
1995–1998	Portuguesa		
1998–2001	Feyenoord	49	(1)
2002	América-MG		
2002–2004	RBC	58	(1)
2004–2006	NEC	62	(7)
2006–2007	Den Haag	23	(2)
2007–2009	AEK Larnaca	18	(1)
Total		210	(12)
- * Club domestic league appearances and goals

Ronildo Pereira de Freitas (born 23 October 1977 in Montes Claros, Minas Gerais), known as Tininho, is a Brazilian retired footballer. On the left side of the pitch, he operated as either a midfielder or a defender.

== Football career ==
In May 1998, at the age of 20, Tininho left Brazil and Associação Portuguesa de Desportos to sign with Feyenoord in the Netherlands. In his first season with the Rotterdam team, he appeared in 28 games to help them win the Eredivisie after a six-year wait.

After a brief spell back in his country with América Futebol Clube (MG), Tininho returned to the Netherlands, where he would remain for the following five seasons always in the top flight, with RBC Roosendaal, NEC Nijmegen and ADO Den Haag. In 2007, he joined AEK Larnaca F.C. from Cyprus, playing two seasons with the club and retiring subsequently.

== Honours ==
Feyenoord

- Eredivisie: 1998–99
- Johan Cruijff Shield: 1999
