= Ronald Waterreus =

Dutch footballer (born 1970)

Personal information
- Date of birth: 25 August 1970 (age 56)
- Place of birth: Lemiers, Netherlands
- Height: 1.85 m (6 ft 1 in)
- Position: Goalkeeper

Youth career
- RKVV
- Roda JC

Senior career*
| Years | Team | Apps | (Gls) |
| 1992–1994 | Roda JC | 65 | (0) |
| 1994–2004 | PSV | 285 | (0) |
| 2004–2005 | Manchester City | 0 | (0) |
| 2005–2006 | Rangers | 49 | (0) |
| 2006–2007 | AZ | 6 | (0) |
| 2007 | New York Red Bulls | 18 | (0) |
| Total | | 423 | (0) |

International career
| 2001–2004 | Netherlands | 7 | (0) |
Medal record
Men's football
Representing Netherlands
UEFA European Championship
| Bronze medal – third place | 2004 |
- * Club domestic league appearances and goals

Ronald Waterreus (Dutch pronunciation: [ˈroːnɑlt ˈʋaːtərøːs]; born 25 August 1970) is a Dutch former professional footballer who played as a goalkeeper. He notably played for PSV Eindhoven and Rangers, before ending his career at New York Red Bulls in the Major League Soccer.

== Club career ==
Born in Lemiers, Limburg, Waterreus started his career in 1992, playing for Roda JC. After joining PSV Eindhoven in 1994 he quickly established himself as one of the best goalkeepers in the Eredivisie, eventually being selected for the Dutch national squad.

After ten seasons as PSV's number one goalkeeper, Waterreus was transferred to Manchester City. He joined SPL side Rangers in January 2005 as cover for the injured Stefan Klos, however he quickly established himself as Rangers' first choice goalkeeper. He was also involved in Rangers' historic 2005–06 Champions League run where they reached the knock-out stage for the first time. Waterreus, however, eventually came under fire from Rangers fans following his criticism of the club in a Dutch newspaper, which was misinterpreted by the fans as a result of poor journalism. Waterreus left Rangers on 7 June 2006 having failed to agree a new contract.

He signed a short-term contract with AZ Alkmaar on 4 December 2006, replacing the injured Joey Didulica and Khalid Sinouh in the month of December. In January 2007, he left the club again and agreed to move to New York Red Bulls in Major League Soccer, where he immediately established himself with three clean sheets and another scoreless half to set the record for longest clean sheet streak to begin an MLS career.

== International career ==
Waterreus was on the Dutch national squad at Euro 2004 but he did not get any playing time. He altogether made seven appearances for his country.

== Honours ==
PSV

- Eredivisie: 1996-97, 1999-2000, 2000-01 & 2002-03
- KNVB Cup: 1995-96
- Johan Cruyff Shield (Super Cup): 1996, 1998, 2000, 2001, 2003

Rangers

- Scottish Premier League: 2004–05
- Scottish League Cup: 2004–05
