= Nikos Machlas =

Greek footballer

Personal information
- Full name: Nikolaos Machlas
- Date of birth: 16 June 1973 (age 53)
- Place of birth: Heraklion, Crete, Greece
- Height: 1.83 m (6 ft 0 in)
- Position: Striker

Youth career
- OFI

Senior career*
Years	Team	Apps	(Gls)
1990–1996	OFI	154	(48)
1996–1999	Vitesse	92	(60)
1999–2003	Ajax	74	(38)
2003	→ Sevilla (loan)	14	(2)
2003–2004	Iraklis	26	(10)
2004–2006	OFI	52	(21)
2006–2008	APOEL	51	(17)
Total		463	(196)

International career
1993–2002	Greece	61	(18)
- * Club domestic league appearances and goals

Nikos Machlas (Greek: Νίκος Μαχλάς, born 16 June 1973) is a Greek former professional footballer who played as a striker.

== Club career ==
=== OFI Crete ===
Machlas began his career with OFI, where he made his debut in February 1991 against Panionios. He stayed at the club for six seasons. He had the Dutchman Eugène Gerards as a coach at OFI.

=== Vitesse ===
Machlas signed for Dutch side Vitesse Arnhem in 1996 from Greece. He scored a disappointing 8 goals in 29 games in his first season in the Eredivisie, but in his second season he scored 34 goals in just 32 games, a feat which earned him the European Golden Boot for the 1997–98 season. He scored 60 goals in 92 matches for Vitesse.

=== Ajax ===
Machlas joined Eredivisie giant Ajax Amsterdam in June 1999 for a then-club record $8.6 million. Despite netting 38 goals in 74 Eredivisie league games spread over three seasons, Machlas' goalscoring record was not deemed prolific enough for the demanding Ajax fans and coaching staff. The team went through a transition as poor results meant Machlas had to endure three coaches in as many years. His place as striker became threatened by coach Ronald Koeman's preference for the younger strikers Zlatan Ibrahimović and Mido. His 12 goals in the 2001–02 season were nevertheless important in the run toward the first league title for Ajax in four years. Ajax also won the KNVB Beker that season, meaning they achieved the "double". At the start of the 2002–03 season, Koeman made it clear to Machlas that there was no future for him anymore in the first team of Ajax and was thus relegated to training and playing matches with the youth team. Eventually, the Greek striker and Ajax Amsterdam had split. "By mutual consent, Ajax and Nikos Machlas have terminated their contract. The termination takes effect immediately," Ajax said in a statement, adding that "the player could now join another club on a free transfer".

After a brief (and frustrating) period in the Ajax youth team, he joined Spanish side Sevilla on loan for the rest of the season, with the Spanish club had an option to sign him on a three-year contract at the end of the season. The former Vitesse striker, who was the highest-paid player at Ajax, suffered further misery in Spain, after he was arrested for traffic offences. He made things worse by 'insulting and injuring' police officers who tried to arrest him after the offence had been committed. He scored just 2 goals in 14 appearances. Upon returning to Ajax, his contract was terminated in July 2003. Before returning to Greece Machlas has emerged as a possible transfer target for Twente. Twente was in desperate need of an experienced striker capable of leading their attacking line next term. "We don't just want any striker," Tukkers chairman Herman Wessels told. "We need someone that fits in with us and makes us better."

=== Iraklis ===
The 30-year-old Greek international forward signed a one-year contract with Iraklis with the option of a further two seasons. He played under the man he calls his "footballing father", Dutch coach Eugène Gerards, who gave Machlas his break aged 18 at OFI. He scored 10 goals in 26 appearances.

=== Return to OFI ===
He returned to his first club, OFI and stayed there for two seasons. Upon the termination of his contract and after conflict with the club's chairman, he moved to APOEL, in Cyprus and signed a two years contract.

=== APOEL ===
In his first year at APOEL, Machlas helped his team to win the Championship. On 17 May 2008, he announced his retirement after the end of the Cypriot Cup final, where APOEL beat 2–0 Anorthosis and clinched the title.

In 2009, he returned to his first club, OFI to take up the role of Sporting Director as they bid to return to the Greek Superleague.

== International career ==
Machlas won 61 caps for the Greece national team and scored 18 goals. He also scored a crucial goal against Russia that led Greece to 1994 FIFA World Cup at only 20 years of age. He started each of Greece's group games in the USA though they lost all three, to Argentina, Nigeria and Bulgaria and failed to score a goal. He played his last game for Greece against Cyprus in May 2002.

== Career statistics ==
=== International ===
Scores and results list Greece's goal tally first, score column indicates score after each Machlas goal.

List of international goals scored by Nikos Machlas
No.	Date	Venue	Opponent	Score	Result	Competition
1	10 March 1993	Ernst Happel Stadion, Wien, Austria	Austria	1–2	1–2	Friendly
2	12 October 1993	Stade Josy Barthel, Luxembourg City, Luxembourg	Luxembourg	1–0	3–1	1994 FIFA World Cup qualifier
3	17 November 1993	Olympic Stadium, Athens, Greece	Russia	1–0	1–0	1994 FIFA World Cup qualifier
4	27 April 1994	Olympic Stadium, Athens, Greece	Saudi Arabia	1–0	5–1	Friendly
5	27 April 1994	Olympic Stadium, Athens, Greece	Saudi Arabia	2–0	5–1	Friendly
6	12 October 1994	Kaftanzoglio Stadium, Thessaloniki, Greece	Finland	3–0	4–0	UEFA Euro 1996 qualifier
7	12 October 1994	Kaftanzoglio Stadium, Thessaloniki, Greece	Finland	4–0	4–0	UEFA Euro 1996 qualifier
8	16 November 1994	Olympic Stadium, Athens, Greece	San Marino	1–0	2–0	UEFA Euro 1996 qualifier
9	15 November 1995	Theodoros Vardinogiannis Stadium, Heraklion, Greece	Faroe Islands	3–0	5–0	UEFA Euro 1996 qualifier
10	19 August 1997	Theodoros Vardinogiannis Stadium, Heraklion, Greece	Cyprus	1–1	2–1	Friendly
11	6 September 1997	Bežigrad Stadium, Ljubljana, Slovenia	Slovenia	3–0	3–0	1998 FIFA World Cup qualifier
12	6 September 1998	Olympic Stadium, Athens, Greece	Slovenia	1–1	2–2	UEFA Euro 2000 qualifier
13	14 October 1998	Olympic Stadium, Athens, Greece	Georgia	1–0	3–0	UEFA Euro 2000 qualifier
14	5 June 1999	Boris Paichadze Dinamo Arena, Tbilisi, Georgia	Georgia	2–1	2–1	UEFA Euro 2000 qualifier
15	13 November 1999	National Stadium, Kilkis, Greece	Nigeria	1–0	2–0	Friendly
16	13 November 1999	National Stadium, Kilkis, Greece	Nigeria	2–0	2–0	Friendly
17	2 June 2001	Theodoros Vardinogiannis Stadium, Heraklion, Greece	Albania	1–0	1–0	2002 FIFA World Cup qualifier
18	10 November 2001	Nikos Goumas Stadium, Athens, Greece	Estonia	4–0	4–2	Friendly

== Honours ==
Ajax

- Eredivisie: 2001–02
- KNVB Cup: 2001–02

APOEL

- Cypriot First Division: 2006–07
- Cypriot Cup: 2007–08

Individual

- Eredivisie top scorer: 1997–98
- European Golden Boot: 1998
