= Marco Boogers =

Dutch footballer (born 1967)

Personal information
- Date of birth: 12 January 1967 (age 59)
- Place of birth: Dordrecht, Netherlands
- Height: 1.85 m (6 ft 1 in)
- Position: Forward

Youth career
- EBOH
- Feyenoord

Senior career*
Years	Team	Apps	(Gls)
1986–1988	DS'79	60	(18)
1988–1990	FC Utrecht	60	(15)
1990–1991	RKC	33	(14)
1991–1992	Fortuna Sittard	29	(13)
1992–1994	RKC	71	(32)
1994–1995	Sparta Rotterdam	25	(11)
1995–1996	West Ham United	4	(0)
1996	→ Groningen (loan)	0	(0)
1996–1997	RKC Waalwijk	9	(0)
1997–1999	FC Volendam	51	(25)
1999–2003	Dordrecht '90	134	(66)
Total		476	(194)

International career
1983	Netherlands U17	2	(0)

Managerial career
- 2005: FC Dordrecht (interim manager)
- * Club domestic league appearances and goals

Marco Boogers (born 12 January 1967) is a Dutch former professional footballer who played as a forward. Boogers spent almost all of his career in the Netherlands, apart from an ill-fated spell at English club West Ham United. He later worked as technical director at FC Dordrecht and managed the club on an interim basis in 2005.

== Playing career ==
=== West Ham United ===
After a decade playing in the Netherlands, especially prolific in their second tier Eerste Divisie, Boogers joined West Ham United from Sparta Rotterdam for £1 million in July 1995, even though West Ham manager Harry Redknapp had never seen him play. Soon after coming on as a substitute against Manchester United at Old Trafford in only his second appearance for the club, he was sent off for a dangerous challenge on Gary Neville. The press called it a "horror tackle" and suggested that Boogers was hired to injure a Manchester United player on purpose. Boogers himself claimed the wet grass made him slide too far and noted that Neville was able to finish the match, but nevertheless he was suspended for four matches. In November he returned as a substitute against Aston Villa in a 4–1 loss. He played his last match a month later, on 2 December, against Blackburn Rovers in a 4–2 defeat. He never started a league match for West Ham; all four of his appearances for the club were as a substitute.

During his first few months at West Ham Boogers had been suffering from worsening pain in his knee. After an MRI scan he underwent an emergency surgery. As his recovery was expected to take three months he was given permission by Redknapp to return to the Netherlands on 28 December in order to attend the birth of his son. While Boogers was recovering from his injury Redknapp signed another striker, Iain Dowie, rendering Boogers surplus to requirements.

=== Return to the Netherlands ===
In February 1996, Boogers was loaned out to Groningen for the remainder of the season, but a few days before he was scheduled to play his first match his knee problems returned and worsened, sending him back into recovery until March 1997. Even though he was still under contract at West Ham, Boogers knew he would not play there again. He last visited the club in February 1996 and never returned.

He finished his career playing for RKC Waalwijk, FC Volendam and Dordrecht '90.

== Technical director ==
After retiring as a player, Boogers worked for hometown club Dordrecht as technical director. His position was under threat, after he infamously clashed with then coach Jan Everse over Boogers' behaviour in 2015. The book Koning van de Krommedijk (King of the Krommedijk stadium) was written about Dordrecht's 2014–15 Eredivisie season, but primarily about Boogers.

He was briefly caretaker manager in 2005 after Robert Verbeek was dismissed.

After returning to his previous role, Boogers left the club in August 2017.

== After football ==
Redknapp would later criticise Boogers in an interview, labelling him a poor player. He also claimed that he never saw Boogers play and that he contracted him on a whim based on a videotape where he appeared to be a world class player. Boogers himself disputed this and claimed scouts from West Ham United attended several of his matches with Sparta before signing him. After stepping away from football in 2017, Boogers ran a family package delivery business in Dordrecht alongside his wife Patricia, son Quincy (who had also played professional football for FC Dordrecht) and daughter Demi.

In 2007 Boogers was voted number 19 in The Times' poll of the "50 Worst footballers (to grace the Premier League)."

== Personal life ==
=== Caravan myth ===
During his convalescence in the Netherlands, The Sun newspaper ran an article claiming Boogers was depressed and had been found on a mobile home site in the Netherlands. Bill Prosser, who worked as West Ham United's PA and travel arranger at the time, disputed this claim, explaining to The Guardian's "The Fiver":

Marco was depressed after being sent off in his second appearance for West Ham at Old Trafford and disappeared for a few days. West Ham's Clubcall reporter phoned me and said he was trying to find Boogers for an interview but could not reach him. He asked if I had booked any flights for him. I told him I hadn't, but added: 'If he has gone back to Holland, he's probably gone by car again'. The reporter misheard me and stated on Clubcall that I had said 'If he's gone back to Holland, he's probably gone to his caravan'. As you know, journalists often listen to Clubcall. Which explains why, the following day, the back page headline in the Sun was: 'Barmy Boogers Living in a Caravan'. The legend endures and Marco Boogers never played for West Ham again. I feel a bit responsible for his misfortune".
