= 1997–98 AFC Ajax season =

Dutch football club season

AFC Ajax
1997–98 season
- Manager: Morten Olsen
- Stadium: Amsterdam Arena
- Eredivisie: 1st
- KNVB Cup: Winners
- UEFA Cup: Quarter-finals
- Top goalscorer: League: Shota Arveladze (25); All: Shota Arveladze (37)
- Highest home attendance: 50,499
- Average home league attendance: 47,315
Home colours

During the 1997–98 Dutch football season, AFC Ajax competed in the Eredivisie.

== Season summary ==
After the previous season's disappointing fourth place, Ajax regrouped to win the Eredivisie, finishing 17 points ahead of runners-up PSV Eindhoven, and the KNVB Cup, thrashing PSV 5–0 in the final.

== Players ==
=== First-team squad ===
Squad at end of season

Note: Flags indicate national team as defined under FIFA eligibility rules; some limited exceptions apply. Players may hold more than one non-FIFA nationality.

| No. | Pos. | Nation | Player |
|---|---|---|---|
| — | GK | NED | Fred Grim |
| — | GK | NED | Casper Nelis |
| — | GK | NED | Edwin van der Sar |
| — | DF | NED | Danny Blind (captain) |
| — | DF | NED | Tim de Cler |
| — | DF | NED | Frank de Boer |
| — | DF | NED | Mario Melchiot |
| — | DF | NED | Tom Sier |
| — | DF | DEN | Ole Tobiasen |
| — | DF | NGR | Christopher Kanu |
| — | DF | GHA | Kofi Mensah (Note: Mensah was born in Koforidua, Ghana, but also qualified to represent the Netherlands internationally and represented the Netherlands at U-21 level.) |
| — | MF | NED | Ronald de Boer |
| — | MF | NED | Peter Hoekstra |
| — | MF | NED | Richard Knopper |
| — | MF | NED | Andy van der Meyde |

| No. | Pos. | Nation | Player |
|---|---|---|---|
| — | MF | NED | Richard Witschge |
| — | MF | DEN | Michael Laudrup |
| — | MF | POR | Dani |
| — | MF | POL | Andrzej Rudy |
| — | MF | ARG | Mariano Juan |
| — | MF | SUR | Dean Gorré |
| — | MF | NGR | Tijani Babangida |
| — | MF | NGR | Sunday Oliseh |
| — | FW | NED | Gerald Sibon |
| — | FW | NED | Rody Turpijn |
| — | FW | FIN | Jari Litmanen |
| — | FW | RUS | Andriy Demchenko (Note: Demchenko was born in Zaporizhzhia, Ukrainian SSR, Soviet Union (now Ukraine), but also qualified to represent Russia internationally and represented Russia at U-19, U-20 and U-21 level.) |
| — | FW | GEO | Shota Arveladze |
| — | FW | RSA | Benni McCarthy |

=== Left club during season ===
Note: Flags indicate national team as defined under FIFA eligibility rules; some limited exceptions apply. Players may hold more than one non-FIFA nationality.

| No. | Pos. | Nation | Player |
|---|---|---|---|
| — | MF | NED | Martijn Reuser (on loan to Vitesse) |

=== Jong Ajax ===
Note: Flags indicate national team as defined under FIFA eligibility rules; some limited exceptions apply. Players may hold more than one non-FIFA nationality.

| No. | Pos. | Nation | Player |
|---|---|---|---|
| — | DF | NED | Serginho Greene |
| — | DF | NED | Quido Lanzaat |
| — | DF | NED | Mitchell Piqué |

| No. | Pos. | Nation | Player |
|---|---|---|---|
| — | MF | NED | Cedric van der Gun |
| — | MF | USA | John O'Brien |

== Transfers ==
=== In ===
- (Denmark) Ole Tobiasen - (Netherlands) Heerenveen, 26 June, DKK7,500,000
- (Denmark) Michael Laudrup - (Japan) Vissel Kobe
- (Suriname) Dean Gorré - (Netherlands) Groningen
- (Poland) Andrzej Rudy - (Belgium) Lierse
- (Nigeria) Sunday Oliseh - (Germany) 1. FC Köln
- (Georgia (country)) Shota Arveladze - (Turkey) Trabzonspor
- (Netherlands) Gerald Sibon - (Netherlands) Roda JC
- (South Africa) Benni McCarthy - (South Africa) Seven Stars

=== Out ===
- (Netherlands) Milan Berck Beelenkamp - (Netherlands) FC Volendam
- (Netherlands) Winston Bogarde - (Italy) A.C. Milan
- (Netherlands) Arnold Scholten - (Japan) JEF United Ichihara
- (Netherlands) John Veldman (Note: Veldman was born in Paramaribo, Suriname, but also qualified to represent the Netherlands internationally and made his international debut for the Netherlands in April 1996.) - (Netherlands) Vitesse
- (Netherlands) Menno Willems - (Netherlands) Vitesse
- (Brazil) Márcio Santos - (Brazil) Atlético Mineiro
- (Netherlands) Kiki Musampa (Note: Musampa was born in Kinshasa, Zaire (now Democratic Republic of the Congo), but also qualified to represent the Netherlands internationally and represented the Netherlands at U-17, U-18, U-19 and U-21 level.) - (France) Bordeaux
- (Netherlands) Marc Overmars - (England) Arsenal, 18 June
- (Netherlands) Martijn Reuser - (Netherlands) Vitesse, loan
- (Netherlands) Dennis Schulp - (Netherlands) FC Volendam
- (Netherlands) Rob Gehring - (Spain) Rayo Vallecano
- (Netherlands) Dave van den Bergh - (Spain) Rayo Vallecano
- (Netherlands) Nordin Wooter - (Spain) Real Zaragoza
- (Netherlands) Patrick Kluivert - (Italy) A.C. Milan, free
- (Argentina) Iván Gabrich - (Spain) Mérida
- (Australia) Hayden Foxe - (Germany) Arminia Bielefeld

== Competitions ==
| Competition | First match | Last match | Starting round | Final position | Record | | | | | | | |
| Competition | First match | Last match | Starting round | Final position | Pld | W | D | L | GF | GA | GD | Win % |
|---|---|---|---|---|---|---|---|---|---|---|---|---|
| Eredivisie | 19 August 1997 | 10 May 1998 | Matchday 1 | Winners | 34 | 29 | 2 | 3 | 112 | 22 | +90 | 85.29 |
| KNVB Cup | 19 November 1997 | 17 May 1998 | Second Round | Winners | 5 | 5 | 0 | 0 | 21 | 1 | +20 | 100.00 |
| UEFA Cup | 16 September 1997 | 17 March 1998 | First Round | Quarter-finals | 8 | 3 | 2 | 3 | 19 | 12 | +7 | 37.50 |
| Total | | | | | 47 | 37 | 4 | 6 | 152 | 35 | +117 | 78.72 |

Source: Competitions

=== Eredivisie ===
==== League table ====
| Pos | Team | Pld | W | D | L | GF | GA | GD | Pts | Qualification or relegation |
|---|---|---|---|---|---|---|---|---|---|---|
| 1 | Ajax (Note: Ajax also won the KNVB Cup, thereby taking the double. They would participate in the Champions League, just like finalists PSV. SC Heerenveen, the winner of the third place match, would play in the Cup Winners' Cup.) (C) | 34 | 29 | 2 | 3 | 112 | 22 | +90 | 89 | Qualification to Champions League group stage |
| 2 | PSV | 34 | 21 | 9 | 4 | 95 | 44 | +51 | 72 | Qualification to Champions League second qualifying round |
| 3 | Vitesse Arnhem | 34 | 21 | 7 | 6 | 85 | 48 | +37 | 70 | Qualification to UEFA Cup first round |
| 4 | Feyenoord | 34 | 18 | 7 | 9 | 62 | 40 | +22 | 61 | Qualification to UEFA Cup first round |
| 5 | Willem II | 34 | 17 | 4 | 13 | 66 | 58 | +8 | 55 | Qualification to UEFA Cup first round |

Source: rsssf.com
(C) Champions

==== Results summary ====
| Overall | | | | | | | | Home | | | | | | Away | | | | | |
| Pld | W | D | L | GF | GA | GD | Pts | W | D | L | GF | GA | GD | W | D | L | GF | GA | GD |
|---|---|---|---|---|---|---|---|---|---|---|---|---|---|---|---|---|---|---|---|
| 34 | 29 | 2 | 3 | 112 | 22 | +90 | 89 | 15 | 0 | 2 | 59 | 11 | +48 | 14 | 2 | 1 | 53 | 11 | +42 |

Source: Eredivisie

==== Results by round ====
| Round | 1 | 2 | 3 | 4 | 5 | 6 | 7 | 8 | 9 | 10 | 11 | 12 | 13 | 14 | 15 | 16 | 17 | 18 | 19 | 20 | 21 | 22 | 23 | 24 | 25 | 26 | 27 | 28 | 29 | 30 | 31 | 32 | 33 | 34 |
|---|---|---|---|---|---|---|---|---|---|---|---|---|---|---|---|---|---|---|---|---|---|---|---|---|---|---|---|---|---|---|---|---|---|---|
| Ground | H | A | A | H | H | A | H | A | A | H | H | A | A | H | H | H | A | H | A | H | A | A | H | H | A | A | A | H | H | A | H | A | A | H |
| Result | W | W | W | W | W | W | W | W | W | W | W | D | W | W | W | W | W | W | W | L | W | D | W | W | W | W | W | W | W | W | W | L | W | L |
| Position | 1 | 1 | 1 | 1 | 1 | 1 | 1 | 1 | 1 | 1 | 1 | 1 | 1 | 1 | 1 | 1 | 1 | 1 | 1 | 1 | 1 | 1 | 1 | 1 | 1 | 1 | 1 | 1 | 1 | 1 | 1 | 1 | 1 | 1 |

Source: Eredivisie
A = Away; H = Home; W = Win; D = Draw; L = Loss

==== Matches ====
| 19 August 1997 1 | Ajax | 5–0 | Vitesse | Amsterdam |
| CEST (UTC+2) | Andrzej Rudy 8'; Babangida 21'; Oliseh 51'; Arveladze 62'; Kreek 85' (o.g.) | Report | Zeman (yellow card) 22' van der Hoeven (yellow card) 60' | Stadium: Amsterdam Arena; Attendance: 49,500; Referee: Jaap Uilenberg |

| 22 August 1997 2 | Fortuna Sittard | 0–5 | Ajax | Sittard |
| CEST (UTC+2) | Lee (yellow card) 60' | Report | Sibon 1'; Babangida 27'; F. de Boer 61' (pen.); Arveladze 66', 74'; Blind (yellow card) 67' | Stadium: Fortuna Sittard Stadion; Attendance: 12,000; Referee: René Temmink |

| 31 August 1997 3 | Utrecht | 1–7 | Ajax | Utrecht |
| CEST (UTC+2) | Decheiver 30' | Report | Babangida 10'; Tobiasen 24', 68' (yellow card) 28'; F. de Boer (yellow card) 60'; Blind 62'; Arveladze 69'; Laudrup 72'; Litmanen 82' | Stadium: Stadion Galgenwaard; Attendance: 14,000; Referee: Dick Jol |

| 9 September 1997 4 | Ajax | 3–0 | RKC Waalwijk | Amsterdam |
| CEST (UTC+2) | Babangida 30'; McCarthy 61', 68'; R. de Boer (yellow card) 62' | Report | Wanrooij (yellow card) | Stadium: Amsterdam Arena; Attendance: 46,400; Referee: Hugo Luijten |

| 12 September 1997 5 | Ajax | 4–1 | Groningen | Amsterdam |
| CEST (UTC+2) | Litmanen 20'; Babangida 29'; Atteveld 77' (o.g.); McCarthy 90' | Report | Atteveld 31'; Magno (yellow card) 34'; Leonardo (red card) 40' | Stadium: Amsterdam Arena; Attendance: 46,300; Referee: Ruud Bossen |

| 21 September 1997 6 | NEC | 1–4 | Ajax | Nijmegen |
| CEST (UTC+2) | van Eijkeren 7' (yellow card) 69'; Roorda (yellow card) 52' | Report | Oliseh 5'; F. de Boer (yellow card) 24'; Litmanen 35', 40'; Laudrup 74' | Stadium: De Goffert; Attendance: 10,213; Referee: Roelof Luinge |

| 24 September 1997 7 | Ajax | 7–0 | MVV Maastricht | Amsterdam |
| CEST (UTC+2) | Arveladze 7', 20', 45'; Laudrup 32', 66'; Dani 59'; Babangida 70' | Report | | Stadium: Amsterdam Arena; Attendance: 44,600; Referee: Hans Reygwart |

| 27 September 1997 8 | Heerenveen | 0–1 | Ajax | Heerenveen |
| CEST (UTC+2) | Mitriță (yellow card) 70'; Gușatu (yellow card) 76' | Report | Babangida 57' | Stadium: Abe Lenstra Stadion; Attendance: 13,900; Referee: Jaap Uilenberg |

| 5 October 1997 9 | Willem II | 0–1 | Ajax | Tilburg |
| CEST (UTC+2) | | Report | Laudrup 13' | Stadium: Willem II Stadion; Attendance: 13,400; Referee: Herman van Dijk |

| 15 October 1997 10 | Ajax | 1–0 | NAC | Amsterdam |
| CEST (UTC+2) | Witschge 84' | Report | Stewart (yellow card); De Roover (yellow card) | Stadium: Amsterdam Arena; Attendance: 49,600; Referee: Jan Wegereef |

| 26 October 1997 11 | Ajax | 4–0 | Feyenoord | Amsterdam |
| CET (UTC+1) | Litmanen 31' (pen.); Arveladze 42'; Dani 51'; R. de Boer 76'; Blind (yellow card) | Report | van Gobbel (red card) 78'; Schuiteman (yellow card); Boateng (yellow card); Cruz (yellow card) | Stadium: Amsterdam Arena; Attendance: 47,000; Referee: Mario van der Ende |

| 30 October 1997 12 | Roda JC | 1–1 | Ajax | Kerkrade |
| CET (UTC+1) | Damjanac (red card) 11'; Valgaeren 37' | Report | Litmanen 45'; F. de Boer (yellow card) 52' | Stadium: Sportpark Kaalheide; Attendance: 12,000; Referee: Roelof Luinge |

| 9 November 1997 13 | Sparta Rotterdam | 0–5 | Ajax | Rotterdam |
| CET (UTC+1) | Marilia (yellow card) 37' | Report | Litmanen 14' (pen.), 37' (pen.), 50'; Dani 58'; McCarthy 81' | Stadium: Het Kasteel; Attendance: 10,500; Referee: Dick Jol |

| 12 November 1997 14 | Ajax | 1–0 | Twente | Amsterdam |
| CET (UTC+1) | F. de Boer 18' | Report | | Stadium: Amsterdam Arena; Attendance: 48,000; Referee: Dick van Egmond |

| 22 November 1997 15 | Ajax | 1–0 | De Graafschap | Amsterdam |
| CET (UTC+1) | Witschge 86' | Report | | Stadium: Amsterdam Arena; Attendance: 46,942; Referee: Jaap Uilenberg |

| 30 November 1997 16 | Ajax | 2–0 | Fortuna Sittard | Amsterdam |
| CET (UTC+1) | Oliseh 78'; Arveladze (yellow card) 80' (goal) 86' | Report | Paauwe (yellow card) 32'; Zegrean (yellow card) (red card) 78'; Zwam (yellow card) van Bommel (yellow card) | Stadium: Amsterdam Arena; Attendance: 48,200; Referee: Hugo Luijten |

| 3 December 1997 17 | MVV Maastricht | 0–3 | Ajax | Maastricht |
| CET (UTC+1) | de Jong (yellow card) | Report | Laudrup 14'; Melchiot (red card) 15'; Babangida 52'; F. de Boer 54'; Blind (yellow card) | Stadium: De Geusselt; Attendance: 10,000; Referee: Jack van Hulten |

| 6 December 1997 18 | Ajax | 1–0 | Roda JC | Amsterdam |
| CET (UTC+1) | Babangida 11' | Report | | Stadium: Amsterdam Arena; Attendance: 49,800; Referee: René Temmink |

| 14 December 1997 19 | Volendam | 0–3 | Ajax | Volendam |
| CET (UTC+1) | | Report | Litmanen 38', 68'; F. de Boer 62' | Stadium: Kras Stadion; Attendance: 7,500; Referee: Roelof Luinge |

| 21 December 1997 20 | Ajax | 3–4 | PSV Eindhoven | Amsterdam |
| CET (UTC+1) | Arveladze 16'; Gorré 54'; Hoekstra 86'; Oliseh (yellow card); Sier (yellow card) | Report | Bruggink 45', 53'; De Bilde 47'; Zenden 66'; Stam (yellow card); Numan (yellow card); Stîngă (yellow card) | Stadium: Amsterdam Arena; Attendance: 51,000; Referee: Dick Jol |

| 8 February 1998 21 | RKC Waalwijk | 1–5 | Ajax | Waalwijk |
| CET (UTC+1) | Hill (yellow card) 49' van der Leegte 51'; Nielsen (yellow card) (yellow-red card) 65' | Report | Arveladze 7'; Laudrup 23', 50', 60'; Babangida 62'; Sier (yellow card) 65' | Stadium: Mandemakers Stadion; Attendance: 6,200; Referee: Herman van Dijk |

| 15 February 1998 22 | PSV Eindhoven | 1–1 | Ajax | Eindhoven |
| CET (UTC+1) | Zenden 62'; Numan (yellow card); Jonk (red card) 87'; Faber (yellow card) (yellow-red card) 90' | Report | R. de Boer 24'; Laudrup (yellow card); Babangida (yellow card) | Stadium: Philips Stadion; Attendance: 28,500; Referee: Jaap Uilenberg |

| 28 February 1998 23 | Ajax | 3–0 | NEC | Amsterdam |
| CET (UTC+1) | Oliseh 23'; Arveladze 30', 32' | Report | Janssen (yellow card) van Eijkeren (yellow card) | Stadium: Amsterdam Arena; Attendance: 46,543; Referee: Ruud Bossen |

| 14 March 1998 24 | Ajax | 6–1 | Volendam | Amsterdam |
| CET (UTC+1) | Laudrup 32'; Gorré 35', 56'; F. de Boer 50' (pen.); Rudy 52'; Sibon 65' | Report | Matthaei (yellow card) 19'; Mans (yellow card) 54'; Schulp (yellow card) 57'; Leeflang 84' | Stadium: Amsterdam Arena; Attendance: 49,400; Referee: Rien Koopman |

| 22 March 1998 25 | NAC | 0–2 | Ajax | Breda |
| CET (UTC+1) | van As (yellow card) (yellow-red card) 60' | Report | Blind (yellow card) 23'; Witschge (yellow card) 54'; Melchiot (yellow card) 78'; Arveladze 86'; McCarthy 88' | Stadium: Rat Verlegh Stadion; Attendance: 16,100; Referee: Roelof Luinge |

| 29 March 1998 26 | Twente | 1–2 | Ajax | Enschede |
| CEST (UTC+2) | Sumiala 36'; Karnebeek (yellow card) 50'; Kamphuis (yellow card) 56' | Report | Oliseh (yellow card) (yellow-red card) 15'; Arveladze 40'; Litmanen 60' | Stadium: Diekman Stadion; Attendance: 11,300; Referee: Dick van Egmond |

| 5 April 1998 27 | Feyenoord | 0–1 | Ajax | Rotterdam |
| CEST (UTC+2) | Graff (yellow card) van Gobbel (yellow card) van Gastel (yellow card); Vitamina (yellow card) | Report | R. de Boer 74'; Sier (yellow card); Laudrup (yellow card) | Stadium: De Kuip; Attendance: 42,100; Referee: Dick Jol |

| 8 April 1998 28 | Ajax | 4–0 | Sparta Rotterdam | Amsterdam |
| CEST (UTC+2) | Babangida 3', 58'; Arveladze 52'; Hoekstra 54' | Report | Kayış (yellow card) 45' | Stadium: Amsterdam Arena; Attendance: 51,500; Referee: Hans Reygwart |

| 11 April 1998 29 | Ajax | 7–2 | Heerenveen | Amsterdam |
| CEST (UTC+2) | R. de Boer 14'; Oliseh 25'; Arveladze 31', 65', 85'; Laudrup 48'; Litmanen 61' (pen.) | Report | Mitriță (yellow card) 24'; Samardžić 51', 74'; Onwuzuruike (yellow card) 60'; Krstev (yellow card) 79' | Stadium: Amsterdam Arena; Attendance: 50,400; Referee: Jack van Hulten |

| 19 April 1998 30 | Groningen | 2–4 | Ajax | Groningen |
| CEST (UTC+2) | Koen (yellow card) 55'; Huizingh 72'; Leonardo (yellow card) 77'; Magno 81' | Report | Litmanen 17'; Arveladze 27', 44', 66'; Oliseh (yellow card) (yellow-red card) 53' | Stadium: Stadion Oosterpark; Attendance: 16,000; Referee: René Temmink |

| 23 April 1998 31 | Ajax | 6–1 | Willem II | Amsterdam |
| CEST (UTC+2) | Melchiot (yellow card) 10'; Babangida 18'; R. de Boer 29', 37'; Arveladze 35', 44'; Blind (yellow card) 60'; McCarthy 73' | Report | Wijnhard (yellow card) 20' (goal) 80' | Stadium: Amsterdam Arena; Attendance: 49,600; Referee: Jan Wegereef |

| 26 April 1998 32 | Vitesse | 2–0 | Ajax | Arnhem |
| CEST (UTC+2) | Machlas 27' van Hintum (yellow card) 44'; Jochemsen 47'; Kreek (yellow card) 48'; Sturing (yellow card) 53' | Report | Mensah (yellow card) 69'; R. de Boer (yellow card) 80' | Stadium: Nieuw Monnikenhuize; Attendance: 26,200; Referee: Herman van Dijk |

| 3 May 1998 33 | De Graafschap | 1–8 | Ajax | Doetinchem |
| CEST (UTC+2) | Viscaal (yellow card) 31'; Wilnis (red card) 79'; Vreman (yellow card) 81'; Fuchs 89' | Report | McCarthy 17', 45', 78'; Litmanen 55' (pen.), 61'; Hoekstra 66' (yellow card) 88'; R. de Boer 80' (pen.) van der Sar 85' (pen.) | Stadium: De Vijverberg; Attendance: 11,000; Referee: Dick Jol |

| 10 May 1998 34 | Ajax | 1–2 | Utrecht | Amsterdam |
| CEST (UTC+2) | Melchiot (yellow card) (yellow-red card) 66'; Arveladze 69'; Witschge (yellow card) 72' | Report | Hernandez (yellow card) 3' de Jong 9'; Asmus (yellow card) 29'; Mols 30'; Scharrenburg (yellow card) 41' | Stadium: Amsterdam Arena; Attendance: 48,400; Referee: Hugo Luijten |

=== KNVB Cup ===
| 19 November 1997 First round | Ajax | 6–0 | MVV Maastricht | Amsterdam |
| CET (UTC+1) | Gorré 49', 55', 60', 84'; Arveladze 63'; F. de Boer 68' | Report | Einarsson (yellow card) | Stadium: Amsterdam Arena; Referee: Wout Schaap |

| 11 February 1998 Round of 16 | Ajax | 5–0 | Roda JC | Amsterdam |
| CET (UTC+1) | Gorré 6', 52'; Rudy 9'; Arveladze 11', 83' | Report | | Stadium: Amsterdam Arena; Referee: Hans Reygwart |

| 11 March 1998 Quarter-finals | Ajax | 2–1 | NAC | Amsterdam |
| CET (UTC+1) | F. de Boer 28'; Gorré 41'; Oliseh (yellow card) | Report | Bogdanović 63' van As (yellow card) van de Looi (yellow card) | Stadium: Amsterdam Arena; Referee: Jaap Uilenberg |

| 7 May 1998 Semi-finals | Ajax | 2–1 | Heerenveen | Amsterdam |
| CEST (UTC+2) | Litmanen 39'; Arveladze 55' (yellow card); Blind 65' | Report | Klompe (yellow card); Hansma (yellow card); Houttuin (yellow card) | Stadium: Amsterdam Arena; Attendance: 35,000; Referee: Ruud Bossen |

| 17 May 1998 Final | Ajax | 5–0 | PSV Eindhoven | Rotterdam |
| CEST (UTC+2) | Babangida 24'; Litmanen 38', 60', 82'; Arveladze 77'; Witschge (yellow card) | Report | Ooijer (yellow card) (yellow-red card) 75'; Numan (yellow card) | Stadium: De Kuip; Attendance: 22,500; Referee: Dick Jol |

=== UEFA Cup ===
==== First round ====
| 16 September 1997 First leg | Maribor (Slovenia) | 1–1 | (Netherlands) Ajax | Maribor |
| 17:30 CEST (UTC+2) | Čeh 47' | Report | Litmanen 67' | Stadium: Ljudski vrt Attendance: 4,922; Referee: Charles Agius (Malta) |

| 30 September 1997 Second leg | Ajax (Netherlands) | 9–1 (10–2 agg.) | (Slovenia) Maribor | Amsterdam |
| 20:30 CEST (UTC+2) | Arveladze 1', 24', 79'; Witschge (yellow card) 12' (goal) 37'; Litmanen 21'; Babangida 40'; F. de Boer 62'; Rudy (yellow card) 77'; Oliseh 84'; McCarthy 86' | Report | Drobne (yellow card) 24'; Ljubobratović 83' | Stadium: Amsterdam Arena; Attendance: 41,500; Referee: Aron Huzu (Romania) |

==== Second round ====
| 21 October 1997 First leg | Ajax (Netherlands) | 1–0 | (Italy) Udinese | Amsterdam |
| 20:30 CEST (UTC+2) | Dani 28' (yellow card) 71'; F. de Boer (yellow card) 65' | Report | Calori (yellow card) 11'; Walem (yellow card) 16'; Cappioli (yellow card) 19' | Stadium: Amsterdam Arena; Attendance: 48,000; Referee: Urs Meier (Switzerland) |

| 4 November 1997 Second leg | Udinese (Italy) | 2–1 (2–2a agg.) | (Netherlands) Ajax | Udine |
| 20:45 CET (UTC+1) | Poggi 25'; Bierhoff 32'; Helveg (yellow card) 35'; Bertotto (yellow card) 40'; Pierini (yellow card) 44'; Gargo (yellow card) 70' | Report | van der Sar (yellow card) 60'; Oliseh (yellow card) 70'; Arveladze 81' | Stadium: Stadio Friuli; Attendance: 38,912; Referee: Paul Durkin (England) |

==== Third round ====
| 25 November 1997 First leg | Ajax (Netherlands) | 4–2 | (Germany) Bochum | Amsterdam |
| 20:45 CET (UTC+1) | Laudrup 34', 36'; Arveladze 38'; Blind (yellow card) 42'; F. de Boer 45' | Report | Reis 20'; Yuran (yellow card) 22'; Wałdoch 24' | Stadium: Amsterdam Arena; Attendance: 48,200; Referee: Serge Muhmenthaler (Switzerland) |

| 11 December 1997 Second leg | Bochum (Germany) | 2–2 (4–6 agg.) | (Netherlands) Ajax | Bochum |
| 20:30 CET (UTC+1) | Hofmann 58'; Mamić 69'; Schreiber (yellow card) 71' | Report | Arveladze 52'; Dani 73' | Stadium: Ruhrstadion; Attendance: 20,034; Referee: Claude Colombo (France) |

==== Quarter-finals ====
| 2 March 1998 First leg | Ajax (Netherlands) | 1–3 | (Russia) Spartak Moscow | Amsterdam |
| 20:30 CET (UTC+1) | Arveladze 57' (yellow card) 57' | Report | Shirko 26', 51' (yellow card) 61'; Gorlukovich (yellow card) 63'; Ananko (yellow card) 69'; Kechinov 84' | Stadium: Amsterdam Arena; Attendance: 40,000; Referee: Günter Benkö (Austria) |

| 17 March 1998 Second leg | Spartak Moscow (Russia) | 1–0 (4–1 agg.) | (Netherlands) Ajax | Moscow |
| 16:00 CET (UTC+1) | Tikhonov (yellow card) 36'; Shirko 86' | Report | | Stadium: Central Dynamo Stadium; Attendance: 32,000; Referee: Vítor Melo Pereira (Portugal) |

=== Appearances and goals ===
As of 2 November 2026

| No. | Pos | Nat | Player | Total | | Eredivisie | | KNVB Cup | | UEFA Cup | |
| No. | Pos | Nat | Player | Apps | Goals | Apps | Goals | Apps | Goals | Apps | Goals |
|---|---|---|---|---|---|---|---|---|---|---|---|
| | GK | (Netherlands) NED | Grim | 2 | 0 | 1 | 0 | +1 | 0 | 0 | 0 |
| | GK | (Netherlands) NED | van der Sar | 46 | 1 | 33 | 1 | 5 | 0 | 8 | 0 |
| | DF | (Netherlands) NED | Blind | 37 | 2 | 26 | 1 | 4 | 1 | 7 | 0 |
| | DF | (Netherlands) NED | de Cler | 1 | 0 | +1 | 0 | 0 | 0 | 0 | 0 |
| | DF | (Netherlands) NED | F. de Boer | 44 | 9 | 31 | 5 | 5 | 2 | 8 | 2 |
| | DF | (Netherlands) NED | Melchiot | 33 | 0 | 21+5 | 0 | 3 | 0 | 2+2 | 0 |
| | DF | (Netherlands) NED | Sier | 24 | 0 | 9+8 | 0 | 1+3 | 0 | +3 | 0 |
| | DF | (Denmark) DEN | Tobiasen | 19 | 2 | 13 | 2 | 1 | 0 | 5 | 0 |
| | DF | (Ghana) GHA | Mensah | 5 | 0 | 4+1 | 0 | 0 | 0 | 0 | 0 |
| | MF | (Netherlands) NED | R. de Boer | 43 | 7 | 31 | 7 | 4 | 0 | 8 | 0 |
| | MF | (Netherlands) NED | Hoekstra | 32 | 3 | 15+8 | 3 | 1+3 | 0 | 3+2 | 0 |
| | MF | (Netherlands) NED | Knopper | 2 | 0 | 1+1 | 0 | 0 | 0 | 0 | 0 |
| | MF | (Netherlands) NED | van der Meyde | 6 | 0 | 1+3 | 0 | +1 | 0 | 1 | 0 |
| | MF | (Netherlands) NED | Witschge | 40 | 3 | 28+1 | 2 | 5 | 0 | 6 | 1 |
| | MF | (Denmark) DEN | Laudrup | 30 | 13 | 19+2 | 11 | 3+1 | 0 | 5 | 2 |
| | MF | (Portugal) POR | Dani | 27 | 5 | 12+6 | 3 | 2 | 0 | 4+3 | 2 |
| | MF | (Poland) POL | Rudy | 33 | 3 | 12+11 | 2 | 3 | 1 | 4+3 | 0 |
| | MF | (Argentina) ARG | Juan | 1 | 0 | +1 | 0 | 0 | 0 | 0 | 0 |
| | MF | (Suriname) SUR | Gorré | 29 | 10 | 8+14 | 3 | 2+2 | 7 | 2+1 | 0 |
| | MF | (Nigeria) NGR | Babangida | 33 | 15 | 23+3 | 13 | 3 | 1 | 4 | 1 |
| | MF | (Nigeria) NGR | Oliseh | 42 | 6 | 29 | 5 | 5 | 0 | 8 | 1 |
| | FW | (Netherlands) NED | Sibon | 16 | 2 | 5+8 | 2 | +1 | 0 | 1+1 | 0 |
| | FW | (Finland) FIN | Litmanen | 34 | 19 | 22+3 | 16 | 3 | 1 | 4+2 | 2 |
| | FW | (Russia) RUS | Demchenko | 2 | 0 | +2 | 0 | 0 | 0 | 0 | 0 |
| | FW | (Georgia (country)) GEO | Arveladze | 44 | 37 | 27+4 | 25 | 5 | 5 | 8 | 7 |
| | FW | (South Africa) RSA | McCarthy | 25 | 10 | 3+14 | 9 | +3 | 0 | +5 | 1 |
