= 1997–98 in Dutch football =

The 1997/1998 season in Dutch football was the 42nd season in the Eredivisie, where Ajax Amsterdam won the double, claiming the title and the Dutch National Cup.

== Johan Cruijff-schaal ==
August 17, 1997

PSV	3–1	Roda JC
Cocu 22', 90'; De Bilde 90'		Van Houdt 84'

Amsterdam ArenA, Amsterdam
Attendance: 15,000
Referee: Jol

== Eredivisie ==
Position	Team	Points	Played	Won	Drawn	Lost	For	Against	Difference
1	Ajax	89	34	29	2	3	112	22	+90
2	PSV	72	34	21	9	4	95	44	+51
3	Vitesse Arnhem	70	34	21	7	6	85	48	+37
4	Feyenoord	61	34	18	7	9	62	40	+22
5	Willem II	55	34	17	4	13	66	58	+8
6	SC Heerenveen	55	34	16	7	11	56	59	-3
7	Fortuna Sittard	48	34	14	6	14	51	53	-2
8	NEC	44	34	14	2	18	40	57	-17
9	FC Twente	43	34	11	10	13	41	42	-1
10	FC Utrecht	43	34	13	4	17	56	64	-8
11	De Graafschap	42	34	11	9	14	45	49	-4
12	NAC	42	34	12	6	16	41	49	-8
13	Sparta	41	34	10	11	13	50	59	-9
14	Roda JC	38	34	10	8	16	44	45	-1
15	MVV	32	34	9	5	20	35	75	-40
16	RKC	31	34	8	7	19	48	71	-23
17	FC Groningen	31	34	7	10	17	42	65	-23
18	FC Volendam	21	34	5	6	23	33	102	-79

- Champions League : Ajax and PSV
- UEFA Cup: Vitesse, Feyenoord and Willem II
- Cup Winners Cup: SC Heerenveen
- Promotion / relegation play-offs ("Nacompetitie"): RKC and FC Groningen
- Relegated: FC Volendam

=== Topscorers ===
Position	Player	Nationality	Club	Goals
1	Nikos Machlas	(Greece)	Vitesse Arnhem	34
2	Shota Arveladze	(Georgia (country))	Ajax Amsterdam	25
3	Ronald Hamming	(Netherlands)	Fortuna Sittard	20
4	Dejan Curovic	(Federal Republic of Yugoslavia)	Vitesse Arnhem	17
5	Jari Litmanen	(Finland)	Ajax Amsterdam	16
–	Michael Mols	(Netherlands)	FC Utrecht	16

=== Awards ===
==== Dutch Footballer of the Year ====
- 1997 — Jaap Stam (PSV Eindhoven)
- 1998 – 1999 — Ruud van Nistelrooy (PSV Eindhoven)

==== Dutch Golden Shoe Winner ====
- 1997 — Jaap Stam (PSV Eindhoven)
- 1998 — Edwin van der Sar (Ajax Amsterdam)

=== Ajax Winning Squad 1997-'98 ===
Goal

- (Netherlands) Fred Grim
- (Netherlands) Edwin van der Sar

Defence

- (Netherlands) Danny Blind
- (Netherlands) Frank de Boer
- (Netherlands) Tim de Cler
- (Argentina) Mariano Juan
- (Netherlands) Mario Melchiot
- (Ghana) Kofi Mensah
- (Nigeria) Sunday Oliseh
- (Netherlands) Tom Sier
- (Netherlands) Raphael Supusepa
- (Denmark) Ole Tobiasen

Midfield

- (Netherlands) Ronald de Boer
- (Portugal) Dani
- (Netherlands) Dean Gorré
- (Netherlands) Richard Knopper
- (Finland) Jari Litmanen
- (Netherlands) Martijn Reuser
- (Poland) Andrzej Rudy
- (Netherlands) Richard Witschge

Attack

- (Georgia (country)) Shota Arveladze
- (Nigeria) Tijani Babangida
- (Russia) Andrey Demchenko
- (Netherlands) Peter Hoekstra
- (Denmark) Michael Laudrup
- (South Africa) Benni McCarthy
- (Netherlands) Andy van der Meyde
- (Netherlands) Gerald Sibon

Management

- (Denmark) Morten Olsen (Coach)
- (Netherlands) Heini Otto (Assistant)
- (Netherlands) Bobby Haarms (Assistant)

== Eerste Divisie ==
Position	Team	Points	Played	Won	Drawn	Lost	For	Against	Difference
1	AZ Alkmaar	72	34	21	9	4	81	31	+50
2	Cambuur Leeuwarden	65	34	20	5	9	66	43	+23
3	FC Emmen	61	34	18	7	9	64	45	+19
4	FC Den Bosch	60	34	17	9	8	60	42	+18
5	ADO Den Haag	58	34	17	7	10	69	43	+26
6	FC Zwolle	54	34	14	12	8	58	42	+16
7	TOP Oss	52	34	16	4	14	59	50	+9
8	FC Eindhoven	51	34	16	3	15	50	52	-2
9	Go Ahead Eagles	49	34	15	4	15	70	55	+15
10	Helmond Sport	47	34	12	11	11	46	45	+1
11	VVV-Venlo	47	34	12	11	11	45	46	-1
12	BV Veendam	45	34	11	12	11	51	55	-4
13	SC Telstar	40	34	11	7	16	43	60	-17
14	SC Heracles	32	34	8	8	18	51	77	-26
15	HFC Haarlem	31	34	8	7	19	43	85	-42
16	Excelsior Rotterdam	30	34	8	6	20	39	64	-25
13	Dordrecht '90	30	34	6	12	16	37	64	-27
18	RBC Roosendaal	22	34	4	10	20	33	66	-33

- Promoted : AZ Alkmaar
- Promotion / relegation play-offs ("Nacompetitie"): Cambuur, Emmen, Den Bosch, ADO Den Haag, Zwolle and Eindhoven

== Promotion and relegation ==
=== Group A ===
Position	Team	Points	Played	Won	Drawn	Lost	For	Against	Difference
1	RKC Waalwijk	14	6	4	2	0	15	5	+10
2	FC Eindhoven	6	6	1	3	2	8	11	-3
3	ADO Den Haag	5	6	0	5	1	5	8	-3
4	FC Emmen	4	6	0	4	2	11	15	-4

=== Group B ===
Position	Team	Points	Played	Won	Drawn	Lost	For	Against	Difference
1	Cambuur Leeuwarden	14	6	4	2	0	15	8	+7
2	FC Zwolle	8	6	2	2	2	8	9	-1
3	FC Groningen	5	6	1	2	3	9	12	-3
4	FC Den Bosch	5	6	1	2	3	7	10	-3

- Stayed / Promoted : RKC Waalwijk and Cambuur Leeuwarden
- Relegated: FC Groningen

== KNVB Cup ==
Quarter-finals
March 11
FC Twente	3
Vitesse Arnhem	1
March 12
PSV Eindhoven	4
Feyenoord Rotterdam	0
March 11
Ajax Amsterdam	2
NAC Breda	1
March 31
SC Heerenveen	3
Fortuna Sittard	0

Semi-finals
April 29
PSV Eindhoven	2
FC Twente	1
May 7
Ajax Amsterdam	3
SC Heerenveen	0

Final
May 17 - Rotterdam
Ajax Amsterdam	5
PSV Eindhoven	0
Third place
May 14 - Zwolle
SC Heerenveen	3
FC Twente	1

* The third place match was necessary to determine the Dutch Cup Winners Cup entrant, since both finalists (Ajax and PSV) were qualified for the Champions League.

=== Final ===
May 17, 1998

Ajax	5–0	PSV
Babangida 25'; Litmanen 38', 61', 84'; Arveladze 79'

De Kuip, Rotterdam
Attendance: ?
Referee: Jol
