= 1998–99 AFC Ajax season =

Dutch football club season

AFC Ajax
1998–99 season
- Chairman: Michael van Praag
- Manager: Morten Olsen (until December); Jan Wouters
- Stadium: Amsterdam Arena
- Eredivisie: 6th
- KNVB Cup: Winners
- Champions League: Group stage
- Johan Cruyff Shield: Runners-up
- Top goalscorer: Jari Litmanen and Benni McCarthy (11)

During the 1998–99 Dutch football season, AFC Ajax competed in the Eredivisie.

== Season summary ==
Having waltzed to the title during the previous season, Ajax suffered a complete collapse this season to finish 6th, 23 points adrift of champions Feyenoord. This was the club's lowest finish since 1965. The club also suffered poor form in Europe, finishing bottom of their Champions League group stage. Manager Morten Olsen had paid for the club's poor form in December with his job; his replacement, promoted reserve-team coach Jan Wouters, was unable to reverse the team's fortunes but managed to lead Ajax to win the KNVB Cup.

== Players ==
=== First-team squad ===
Note: Flags indicate national team as defined under FIFA eligibility rules; some limited exceptions apply. Players may hold more than one non-FIFA nationality.

No.	Pos.	Nation	Player
1	GK	NED	Edwin Van Der Sar
2	DF	DEN	Ole Tobiasen
3	DF	NED	Danny Blind (captain)
4	DF	NED	Frank de Boer
5	DF	NED	Tom Sier
6	MF	NED	Ronald de Boer
7	MF	NGA	Tijani Babangida
8	MF	NED	Richard Witschge
9	FW	NED	Gerald Sibon
10	FW	FIN	Jari Litmanen
11	MF	GEO	Georgi Kinkladze
12	GK	NED	Fred Grim
13	MF	NED	Richard Knopper
14	FW	POR	Dani
15	MF	NGA	Sunday Oliseh

No.	Pos.	Nation	Player
16	FW	DEN	Jesper Grønkjær
17	FW	RSA	Benni McCarthy
18	MF	POL	Andrzej Rudy
19	DF	NED	Mario Melchiot
20	MF	SUR	Dean Gorré
21	DF	GHA	Kofi Mensah (Note: Mensah was born in Koforidua, Ghana, but also qualified to represent the Netherlands internationally and represented the Netherlands at U-21 level.)
22	MF	NED	Peter Hoekstra
24	FW	GEO	Shota Arveladze
25	FW	BRA	Wamberto
29	FW	ANT	Brutil Hosé (Note: Hosé was born in Willemstad, Netherlands Antilles (now Curaçao), but also qualified to represent the Netherlands internationally and represented the Netherlands at U-21 level before making his international debut for the Netherlands Antilles in 2004.)
34	MF	NED	Andy van der Meyde
37	DF	NED	Tim de Cler
32	DF	NED	Quido Lanzaat
33	DF	NGA	Christopher Kanu
35	FW	NED	Kevin Bobson

=== Left club during season ===
Note: Flags indicate national team as defined under FIFA eligibility rules; some limited exceptions apply. Players may hold more than one non-FIFA nationality.

No.	Pos.	Nation	Player
25	MF	NED	Martijn Reuser (on loan to Vitesse)
23	MF	ARG	Mariano Juan (on loan to Racing)

No.	Pos.	Nation	Player
27	MF	USA	John O'Brien (on loan to Utrecht)

=== Jong Ajax ===
Note: Flags indicate national team as defined under FIFA eligibility rules; some limited exceptions apply. Players may hold more than one non-FIFA nationality.

No.	Pos.	Nation	Player
—	DF	NED	Serginho Greene
—	DF	NED	Mitchell Piqué

No.	Pos.	Nation	Player
36	MF	NED	Cedric van der Gun

== Transfers ==
=== In ===
- (Brazil) Wamberto - (Belgium) Standard Liège, August
- (Georgia (country)) Georgi Kinkladze - (England) Manchester City, £5,000,000
- (Denmark) Jesper Grønkjær - (Denmark) AaB, £3,500,000, July

=== Out ===
- (Netherlands) Edwin van der Sar - (Italy) Juventus, approx. £5,000,000
- (Netherlands) Ronald de Boer - (Spain) Barcelona
- (Argentina) Mariano Juan - (Argentina) Racing, loan
- (Denmark) Michael Laudrup - retired
- (Russia) Andriy Demchenko (Note: Demchenko was born in Zaporizhzhia, Ukrainian SSR, Soviet Union (now Ukraine), but also qualified to represent Russia internationally and represented Russia at U-19, U-20 and U-21 level.) - (Ukraine) FC Metalurh Zaporizhya

== Results ==
=== Champions League ===
==== Group stage ====
Pos	Team	Pld	W	D	L	GF	GA	GD	Pts	Qualification	OLY	CZG	POR	AJX
1	(Greece) Olympiacos	6	3	2	1	8	6	+2	11	Advance to knockout stage	—	2–0	2–1	1–0
2	Croatia Zagreb	6	2	2	2	5	7	−2	8		1–1	—	3–1	0–0
3	(Portugal) Porto	6	2	1	3	11	9	+2	7		2–2	3–0	—	3–0
4	(Netherlands) Ajax	6	2	1	3	4	6	−2	7		2–0	0–1	2–1	—

Source: UEFA

16 September 1998	Croatia Zagreb	0–0	(Netherlands) Ajax	Maksimir, Zagreb
		Report		Attendance: 33,000; Referee: Kim Milton Nielsen (Denmark)

30 September 1998	Ajax (Netherlands)	2–1	(Portugal) Porto	Amsterdam ArenA, Amsterdam
	Rudy 57'; Litmanen 86' (pen.)	Report	Zahovič 68'	Attendance: 40,000; Referee: Piero Ceccarini (Italy)

21 October 1998	Olympiacos (Greece)	1–0	(Netherlands) Ajax	Spiridon Louis, Athens
	Alexandris 39'	Report		Attendance: 73,250; Referee: Manuel Díaz Vega (Spain)

4 November 1998	Ajax (Netherlands)	2–0	(Greece) Olympiacos	Amsterdam ArenA, Amsterdam
	Witschge 33'; Gorré 88'	Report		Attendance: 45,000; Referee: Stefano Braschi (Italy)

25 November 1998	Ajax (Netherlands)	0–1	Croatia Zagreb	Amsterdam ArenA, Amsterdam
		Report	Šimić 68'	Attendance: 46,000; Referee: Marc Batta (France)

9 December 1998	Porto (Portugal)	3–0	(Netherlands) Ajax	Estádio das Antas, Porto
	Zahovič 54', 80'; Drulović 73'	Report		Attendance: 15,000; Referee: Pierluigi Collina (Italy)
