= 1999–2000 AFC Ajax season =

Dutch football club season

AFC Ajax
1999–2000 season
- Chairman: Michael van Praag
- Manager: Jan Wouters
- Stadium: Amsterdam Arena
- Eredivisie: 5th
- Amstel Cup: Round of 16
- UEFA Cup: Third round
- Johan Cruyff Shield: Runners-up
- Top goalscorer: Richard Knopper (15)

During the 1999–2000 Dutch football season, Ajax competed in the Eredivisie.

== Season summary ==
Another poor season saw Ajax finish in fifth, though this at least was an improvement on finishing sixth the previous season.

== Players ==
=== First-team squad ===
Squad at end of season. Squad numbers refer to numbers worn in European competitions.

Note: Flags indicate national team as defined under FIFA eligibility rules; some limited exceptions apply. Players may hold more than one non-FIFA nationality.

No.	Pos.	Nation	Player
1	GK	NED	Fred Grim
2	DF	DEN	Ole Tobiasen
3	DF	NED	Ferdi Vierklau
4	DF	NED	Jan van Halst
5	DF	NED	Frank Verlaat
6	MF	NED	Aron Winter (captain)
7	FW	BRA	Wamberto
8	MF	NED	Richard Witschge
9	FW	GRE	Nikos Machlas
10	FW	DEN	Brian Laudrup
11	MF	DEN	Jesper Grønkjær
13	MF	NED	Richard Knopper
14	FW	POR	Dani
15	DF	NED	Tim de Cler
16	DF	NED	John Nieuwenburg
17	DF	ROU	Cristian Chivu

No.	Pos.	Nation	Player
18	MF	USA	John O'Brien
19	FW	NGA	Tijani Babangida
21	MF	NGA	Pius Ikedia
23	MF	NED	Martijn Reuser
24	FW	GEO	Shota Arveladze
25	DF	NGA	Christopher Kanu
26	FW	NED	Brutil Hosé (Note: Hosé was born in Willemstad, Netherlands Antilles (now Curaçao), but also qualified to represent the Netherlands internationally and represented the Netherlands at U-21 level before making his international debut for the Netherlands Antilles in 2004.)
28	GK	NED	Serge van den Ban
29	FW	NED	Kevin Bobson
30	DF	NED	Mitchell Piqué
36	DF	NED	Quido Lanzaat
37	MF	RSA	Aaron Mokoena
42	MF	GHA	Abubakari Yakubu
43	MF	NED	Rafael van der Vaart

=== Left club during season ===
Note: Flags indicate national team as defined under FIFA eligibility rules; some limited exceptions apply. Players may hold more than one non-FIFA nationality.

No.	Pos.	Nation	Player
27	MF	NED	Cedric van der Gun (on loan to Den Bosch)
—	MF	NED	Peter Hoekstra (on loan to Compostela)

No.	Pos.	Nation	Player
—	MF	NED	Andy van der Meyde (on loan to Twente)

=== Jong Ajax ===
Note: Flags indicate national team as defined under FIFA eligibility rules; some limited exceptions apply. Players may hold more than one non-FIFA nationality.

No.	Pos.	Nation	Player
—	GK	NED	Maarten Stekelenburg
—	DF	NED	Serginho Greene
—	DF	NED	John Heitinga
—	MF	NED	Nigel de Jong

No.	Pos.	Nation	Player
—	MF	NED	Jeffrey Sneijder
—	MF	NED	Wesley Sneijder
—	MF	COL	Daniel Cruz

== Transfers ==
=== Out ===
- Danny Blind - retired
- Gerald Sibon - Sheffield Wednesday, £2,000,000
- Kofi Mensah (Note: Mensah was born in Koforidua, Ghana, but also qualified to represent the Netherlands internationally and represented the Netherlands at U-21 level.) - NAC Breda
- Dean Gorré - Huddersfield Town
- Mario Melchiot - Chelsea, free
- Andrzej Rudy - Lierse
- Sunday Oliseh - Juventus
- Jari Litmanen - Barcelona

== Results ==
=== UEFA Cup ===
==== Second round ====
21 October 1999	Hapoel Haifa (Israel)	0–3	(Netherlands) Ajax	Kiryat Eliezer Stadium, Haifa
		Report	Machlas 3'; Knopper 12'; Laudrup 55'	Attendance: 14,500; Referee: Tomasz Mikulski (Poland)

4 November 1999	Ajax (Netherlands)	0–1	(Israel) Hapoel Haifa	Amsterdam Arena, Amsterdam
		Report	Roso 60'	Attendance: 37,400; Referee: Knud Erik Fisker (Denmark)

Ajax won 3–1 on aggregate.

==== Third round ====
25 November 1999	Ajax (Netherlands)	0–1	(Spain) Mallorca	Amsterdam Arena, Amsterdam
		Report	Tristán 35'	Attendance: 40,123; Referee: Ľuboš Micheľ (Slovakia)

9 December 1999	Mallorca (Spain)	2–0	(Netherlands) Ajax	Son Moix, Palma
	Soler 2'; Biagini 70'	Report		Attendance: 20,500; Referee: Fritz Stuchlik (Austria)

Mallorca won 3–0 on aggregate.
