= Andy van der Meyde =

Dutch footballer (born 1979)

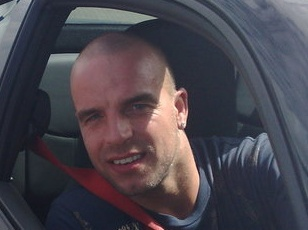
- Van der Meyde in 2008

Personal information
- Date of birth: 30 September 1979 (age 47)
- Place of birth: Arnhem, Netherlands
- Height: 1.77 m (5 ft 10 in)
- Position: Winger

Youth career
- 1989–1993: Vitesse 1892
- 1993–1998: Ajax

Senior career*
Years	Team	Apps	(Gls)
1997–2003	Ajax	91	(18)
1999–2000	→ Twente (loan)	32	(2)
2003–2005	Inter Milan	32	(1)
2005–2009	Everton	20	(0)
2010	PSV	0	(0)
2011–2012	WKE	6	(0)
Total		181	(21)

International career
2002–2004	Netherlands	17	(1)
Medal record
Men's football
Representing Netherlands
UEFA European Championship
Bronze medal – third place	2004
- * Club domestic league appearances and goals

Andy van der Meijde (Dutch pronunciation: [ˈɛndi vɑn dər ˈmɛidə]; born 30 September 1979), anglicised to van der Meyde, is a Dutch former professional footballer who played as a winger.

After making a name for himself at Ajax, he went on to represent Inter Milan and Everton, his spell at the latter club being cut short due to several problems, both on and off the pitch.

A full international between 2002 and 2004, he won 17 caps and scored one goal for the Dutch national team. He represented his country at UEFA Euro 2004.

== Club career ==
=== Ajax ===
Born in Arnhem, Gelderland, Van der Meyde signed for Ajax as a youngster, and made his first-team debut aged just 18, helping to a 1–0 win against Twente on 12 November 1997. In 1999, in order to gain experience, he was loaned to Twente for one season, and was an undisputed starter for a side that finished sixth in the Eredivisie.

It would be in 2001–02 that Van der Meyde established himself as first-choice at Ajax. After a turbulent start, Ronald Koeman was instated as head coach, and the player became an integral part in the rebuilding of the team, making the right-winger position his own. The campaign ended in huge success as the Amsterdam club conquered the double, with him scoring five times in the league.

In 2002–03 Van der Meyde – playing alongside the likes of youngsters as Mido, Zlatan Ibrahimović, Rafael van der Vaart, Wesley Sneijder, Steven Pienaar and Cristian Chivu – scored a career-best 11 goals, while also helping Ajax to the quarterfinals in the UEFA Champions League, netting in a crucial 1–1 away draw against Roma which certified the team's qualification for the knockout stages.

=== Inter Milan ===
In the 2003 off-season, 24-year-old Van der Meyde was acquired by Inter Milan from Italy, for £4 million. However, he managed only 14 Serie A appearances in his first season, appearing slightly more in the following campaign.

Van der Meyde scored a spectacular goal against Arsenal on 17 September 2003, in the Champions League group stage 3–0 away win at Highbury, as Inter were eventually ousted in the group stages.

=== Everton ===
After leaving Inter, strong speculation suggested Van der Meyde would return to Ajax, with additional reported interest from French club Monaco and Tottenham Hotspur in England. However, on 31 August 2005, he agreed a contract with another Premier League team, Everton, for £2 million; on 25 March 2006, in his first Merseyside derby against Liverpool, he received a straight red card for his challenge on Liverpool's Xabi Alonso, in a 1–3 away loss.

In the summer of 2006, Van der Meyde proved once again to be the centre of much speculation regarding his future, having failed to properly settle at Everton and making only ten appearances in his first season thanks to a combination of injuries and rumours of alcoholism. He staunchly denied any such allegations and reaffirmed his commitment in June 2006, stating

"I want to stay, I am desperate to stay. I love it here. Everything suits my game. I'm happy in England and I want to show everyone that I can really play football. If I get the chance next season, I will do it."

Van der Meyde was admitted to hospital in the early hours of 7 August 2006, with breathing problems. It was claimed that his drink had been spiked whilst in a bar in Liverpool. He was fined by Everton for breach of discipline and, to further add to a miserable week, his house was burgled during a friendly with Athletic Bilbao five days later: his Ferrari, Mini Cooper, and dog were amongst the items stolen. The cars and pet dog were later found, although the Ferrari had its windscreen smashed. In March 2007, the player accused manager David Moyes of telling 'downright lies' in regard to his fitness, but apologised afterwards.

In July 2007, Van der Meyde played a full 90 minutes in Coleraine, Northern Ireland. In arguably his most successful pre-season at the club, he went on to complete several friendly matches in an attempt to gain fitness ahead of the new domestic league campaign. However, he further cast a doubt over his Everton future by failing to turn up for a scheduled training session.

On 17 August 2007, Van der Meyde was suspended following a 'breach of club discipline' because he had failed to appear at training, being fined two weeks' wages for a total of £50,000. The player appealed for "understanding from the club and fans" due to the personal situation he was facing, with his five-month-old daughter Dolce not being allowed to leave the hospital since her birth due to illness; following this, he did not make an appearance for the main squad for over a year, being limited to just reserve team football.

Van der Meyde returned to first-team football on 7 December 2008, playing five minutes for an injury-hit Everton side in a 2–3 home defeat to Aston Villa. The following month, he was brought on as a substitute in the FA Cup fourth round replay against Liverpool, providing the assist to Dan Gosling's winning strike in the 118th minute; he was released in June 2009, after his contract expired.

=== Later years ===
Van der Meyde spent six months unattached before agreeing a short-term deal with PSV Eindhoven in March 2010. On 23 April he made his debut for the club in a 3–0 friendly win over VVV-Venlo, but failed to appear officially during his stint.

In late February 2011, Van der Meyde retired from professional football at the age of 31. However, in December, he returned to action and joined Topklasse amateurs WKE based in Emmen, until the end of the season.

== International career ==
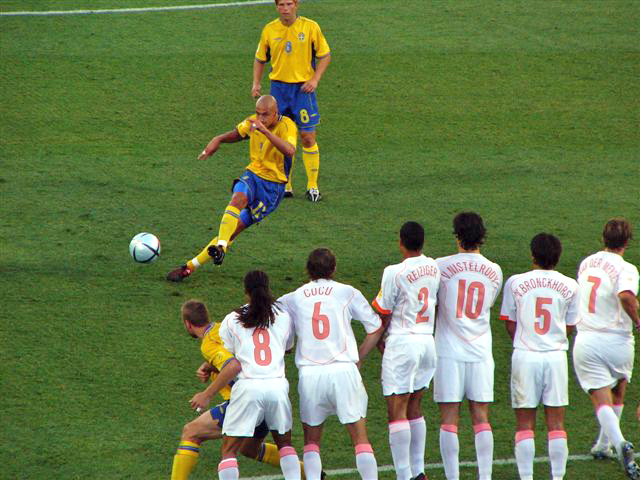
Van der Meyde (wearing No.7) in the Dutch wall, facing a free kick against Sweden at Euro 2004.

On 19 May 2002, Van der Meyde was handed his debut for Dick Advocaat's Dutch national team against the United States, which he marked with a goal in a 2–0 win. He helped the country reach the semi-finals of UEFA Euro 2004, featuring in four games – all starts – and assisting Ruud van Nistelrooy in the 1–1 group stage draw to Germany, but being overlooked for the last-four match against Portugal.

After the tournament, following Marco van Basten's appointment as national team manager and the emergence of youngsters as Arjen Robben, Robin van Persie and Rafael van der Vaart, Van der Meyde failed to receive another callup, finishing his international career with 17 caps.

== Personal life ==
Van der Meyde has two daughters from a previous marriage.

In November 2012, following the publication of his biography Geen genade (English: No Mercy), Van der Meyde gave a series of media interviews, including with The Times in England, in which he admitted to a long term series of personal problems: after a difficult first year in Milan he spent a long time on the bench in his second year, and began drinking. Offered the chance to join AS Monaco at the end of the season his wife, who liked to keep animals, rejected the prospect of living in an apartment, so he moved to Everton. Injured upon arriving, he played regularly for a period after regaining fitness, before getting injured against Manchester United; in rehabilitation for six months, after his newly born daughter was hospitalised for an equal period, he again turned to alcohol.

In his second year at Everton, Van der Meyde's wife and daughters returned to the Netherlands to enable his youngest child to have access to hospital treatment and to maintain close ties with family members. Van der Meyde began an affair, which his wife discovered after she paid a private detective to follow his activities; this led to his divorce, and also a break-up with his girlfriend.

After his contract with Everton was terminated at the end of the fourth season due to recurring injuries, personal problems, and falling out with manager David Moyes, Van der Meyde remained as a resident of Liverpool for a year. Moving in with a friend he began a downward spiral of drink, excessive gambling and drug taking, including cocaine.

Realising his now depressive state, Van der Meyde agreed with his agent to return to Amsterdam, who negotiated a training agreement with former club Ajax. This allowed him to turn around his life, and regain contact with his ex-wife and daughters.

On 24 May 2014, Van der Meyde refereed the Lingerie World Cup, which the Netherlands won on home soil.

== Career statistics ==
=== Club ===
Appearances and goals by club, season and competition
Club	Season	League			National cup		League cup		Continental		Total	
Club	Season	Division	Apps	Goals	Apps	Goals	Apps	Goals	Apps	Goals	Apps	Goals
Ajax	1997–98	Eredivisie	4	0	1	0	–		1	0	6	0
Ajax	1998–99	Eredivisie	1	0	0	0	–		0	0	1	0
Ajax	1999–2000	Eredivisie	0	0	0	0	–		–		0	0
Ajax	2000–01	Eredivisie	27	2	1	0	–		3	0	31	2
Ajax	2001–02	Eredivisie	30	5	4	2	–		5	0	39	7
Ajax	2002–03	Eredivisie	29	11	3	0	–		13	1	45	12
Ajax	Total		91	18	9	2	0	0	22	1	122	21
Twente (loan)	1999–2000	Eredivisie	32	2	2	1	0	0	0	0	34	3
Inter Milan	2003–04	Serie A	14	1	4	1	–		7	1	25	3
Inter Milan	2004–05	Serie A	18	0	5	0	–		6	1	29	1
Inter Milan	Total		32	1	9	1	0	0	13	2	54	4
Everton	2005–06	Premier League	10	0	0	0	1	0	0	0	11	0
Everton	2006–07	Premier League	8	0	1	0	1	0	0	0	10	0
Everton	2007–08	Premier League	0	0	0	0	0	0	0	0	0	0
Everton	2008–09	Premier League	2	0	1	0	0	0	0	0	3	0
Everton	Total		20	0	2	0	2	0	0	0	24	0
PSV Eindhoven	2009–10	Eredivisie	0	0	0	0	0	0	0	0	0	0
WKE	2011–12	Topklasse	6	0	0	0	–		–		6	0
Career total			181	21	22	4	2	0	35	3	240	28

=== International ===
Appearances and goals by national team and year
National team	Year	Apps	Goals
Netherlands	2002	3	1
Netherlands	2003	5	0
Netherlands	2004	9	0
Total		17	1

#	Date	Venue	Opponent	Score	Result	Competition
1.	19 May 2002	CMGi Field, Foxborough, Massachusetts, United States	United States	1–0	2–0	Friendly

== Honours ==
Ajax

- Eredivisie: 1997–98, 2001–02
- KNVB Cup: 1997–98, 1998–99, 2001–02
- Johan Cruijff Shield: 2002

Inter Milan

- Coppa Italia: 2004–05
