= Mario Melchiot =

Dutch football player (born 1976)

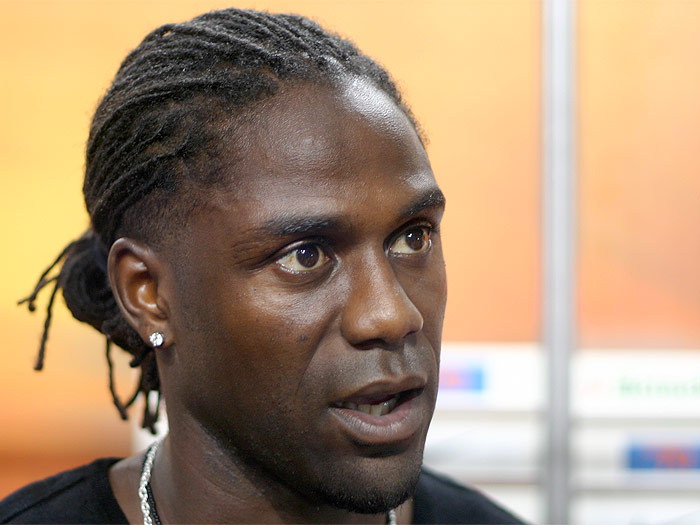
- Melchiot in 2007

Personal information
- Full name: Mario Dino Patrick Melchiot
- Date of birth: 4 November 1976 (age 50)
- Place of birth: Amsterdam, Netherlands
- Height: 1.88 m (6 ft 2 in)
- Position: Right-back

Senior career*
Years	Team	Apps	(Gls)
1996–1999	Ajax	73	(1)
1999–2004	Chelsea	130	(4)
2004–2006	Birmingham City	57	(2)
2006–2007	Rennes	30	(2)
2007–2010	Wigan Athletic	97	(0)
2010–2011	Umm Salal	20	(0)
Total		407	(9)

International career
1994–1995	Netherlands U19	11	(1)
1996–1998	Netherlands U21	13	(0)
2000–2008	Netherlands	22	(0)
- * Club domestic league appearances and goals

Mario Dino Patrick Melchiot (born 4 November 1976) is a Dutch former professional footballer who played as a defender. He played both as a right-back and as a centre-back, and also occasionally played in midfield. He represented the Netherlands national football team at UEFA Euro 2008, and mostly played abroad for football clubs in England, France and Qatar.

== Early life ==
Melchiot was born and raised in Amsterdam, living with his two brothers and two sisters. He enjoyed a close relationship with his eldest brother, Winston, who acted as Mario's mentor after their parents split up. When Winston died of a heart attack at the age of 25 in 1996, Melchiot considered giving up football.

== Club career ==
=== Ajax ===
Melchiot started his career in the youth system at Ajax, and made his debut in the 1996–97 season. He scored his first goal for the club in the semi-final of the Champions League in a 4–1 defeat against Juventus. Melchiot spent three seasons at the club, winning the Eredivisie in 1998 and the KNVB Cup in 1998 and 1999. In the summer of 1999, he signed a three-year contract with Chelsea under the Bosman ruling.

=== Chelsea ===
For most of his first season at the club, Melchiot did not feature in the first team due to injuries. However, on 22 April 2000, following an injury to Albert Ferrer, he finally made his debut in a 1–1 draw against Middlesbrough. A month later he played in the 2000 FA Cup Final against Aston Villa where he played a major role in helping Chelsea win the match.

At the start of the 2000–01 season, Melchiot scored his first goal for Chelsea in a 2–0 win against Manchester United in the 2000 FA Charity Shield. His second goal was also against Manchester United, as he helped his team to a memorable 3–0 win at Old Trafford in the 2001–02 season. Under the management of Claudio Ranieri, He quickly established himself as the club's first-choice right-back, and was soon rewarded with a contract extension, keeping him at the club until 2004.

=== Birmingham City ===
Melchiot signed for Birmingham City on a three-year contract in July 2004, and made his debut in a 1–1 draw against Portsmouth. In his second season, Birmingham found themselves in a relegation battle. He soon became a scapegoat for the club's poor performances, and was booed by his own supporters in a match against Tottenham Hotspur. Birmingham were finally relegated in April 2006 after a 0–0 draw with Newcastle United. He played his last game for Birmingham in their 1–0 defeat to Bolton Wanderers on 7 May 2006. He scored two league goals during his spell at Birmingham, against Charlton Athletic and Wigan Athletic.

=== Rennes ===
In August 2006, Melchiot joined French outfit Rennes on a one-year contract. He scored his first goal for the club in a Coupe de la Ligue Round of 16 tie against Ligue 2 club Libourne-Saint-Seurin. He endeared himself to the Rennes faithful when he scored his first league goal for the club in a 2–0 win over fierce rivals Nantes. Melchiot's contract with Rennes lasted until the summer of 2007.

=== Wigan Athletic ===
Melchiot joined Wigan Athletic on a free transfer on 15 June 2007. On 24 July 2007, he was given the Wigan captaincy, following the departure of his compatriot Arjan de Zeeuw. He became a fan-favourite at the JJB Stadium, and made Latics history when he became the first Wigan player to play in a major international tournament by coming on for the Netherlands against Romania at the UEFA Euro 2008 tournament. He made 101 appearances for Wigan during his three years at the club.

=== Umm Salal ===
In June 2010, Melchiot turned down a new contract from Wigan and agreed to join Umm-Salal Sports Club on a free transfer after his existing contract expired at the end of the month. He was signed by Umm Salal manager, Henk ten Cate, as he was reportedly interested in an experienced defender after signing Spanish midfielder Gabri. He made his debut in a 2–2 draw against Al-Arabi. At the end of the 2010–11 Qatar Stars League Season, he left Umm-Salal as they opted not to give him a new one-year contract.

== International career ==
Melchiot was capped 22 times for the Netherlands since making his international debut on 11 October 2000 in a 2–0 World Cup qualifier defeat against Portugal. His last international appearance was in the final group match of UEFA Euro 2008 against Romania on 17 June 2008.

== Outside football ==
In 1998, Melchiot and Ajax teammates Benni McCarthy and Dean Gorre, calling themselves BMD, released a rap/R & B track called "Midas Touch". He has also campaigned for the British Heart Foundation and has appeared on the quiz show A Question of Sport.

== Career statistics ==
Appearances and goals by club, season and competition
Club	Season	League			National Cup (Note: Includes KNVB Cup, FA Cup, Coupe de France)		League Cup (Note: Includes Football League Cup, Coupe de la Ligue)		Europe		Other		Total	
Club	Season	Division	Apps	Goals	Apps	Goals	Apps	Goals	Apps	Goals	Apps	Goals	Apps	Goals
Ajax	1996–97	Eredivisie	23	0	1	0	—		9 (Note: Appearance(s) in UEFA Champions League)	1	1 (Note: Appearance in Johan Cruyff Shield)	0	34	1
Ajax	1997–98	Eredivisie	26	0	3	0	—		4 (Note: Appearance(s) in UEFA Cup)	0			33	0
Ajax	1998–99	Eredivisie	24	1	4	1	—		1	0	1	0	30	2
Ajax	Total		73	1	8	1	—		14	1	2	0	97	3
Chelsea	1999–2000	Premier League	5	0	1	0	0	0	0	0	—		6	0
Chelsea	2000–01	Premier League	31	0	1	0	1	0	1	0	1 (Note: Appearance in FA Charity Shield)	1	35	1
Chelsea	2001–02	Premier League	37	2	6	0	4	0	3	0	—		50	2
Chelsea	2002–03	Premier League	34	0	5	0	2	0	0	0	—		41	0
Chelsea	2003–04	Premier League	23	2	3	0	2	0	5	0	—		33	2
Chelsea	Total		130	4	16	0	9	0	9	0	1	1	165	5
Birmingham City	2004–05	Premier League	34	1	2	0	2	0	—		—		38	1
Birmingham City	2005–06	Premier League	23	1	5	0	1	0	—		—		29	1
Birmingham City	Total		57	2	7	0	3	0	—		—		67	2
Rennes	2006–07	Ligue 1	30	2	1	0	3	1	—		—		34	3
Wigan Athletic	2007–08	Premier League	31	0	1	0	1	0	—		—		33	0
Wigan Athletic	2008–09	Premier League	34	0	0	0	1	0	—		—		35	0
Wigan Athletic	2009–10	Premier League	32	0	1	0	0	0	—		—		33	0
Wigan Athletic	Total		97	0	2	0	2	0	—		—		101	0
Career total			387	9	34	1	17	1	23	1	3	1	464	13

== Honours ==
Ajax

- Eredivisie: 1997–98
- KNVB Cup: 1997–98, 1998–99
- Ajax talent of the year 1997

Chelsea

- FA Cup: 1999–2000; runner-up: 2001–02
- FA Charity Shield: 2000
