= Max Houttuin =

Dutch footballer

Personal information
- Date of birth: 20 April 1978 (age 48)
- Place of birth: Leeuwarden, Netherlands
- Position: Midfielder

Youth career
- 1984-: Blauw Wit ’34
- Cambuur
- Heerenveen

Senior career*
Years	Team	Apps	(Gls)
1996–2003	Heerenveen	52	(2)
→ 2001–2003	Veendam (loan)	32	(3)
Total		84	(5)

International career
1996	Netherlands U19	1	(0)
1996–1997	Netherlands U21	6	(0)
- * Club domestic league appearances and goals

Max Houttuin (born 20 April 1978) is a former professional footballer who played as a midfielder for SC Heerenveen.

== Club career ==
He played for Heerenveen in the 2000–01 UEFA Champions League and the Dutch Olympic team with Mark Van Bommel, Wilfred Bouma, Kevin Hofland and Arnold Bruggink. Heerenveen loaned him to Veendam in 2001 and again in 2002.

However, by 2005 following a succession of injuries Houttuin had retired from football to re-train as a carer for people with a mental handicap. He runs a football school and coached local amateur club FC Stiens in the town where he lives with his girlfriend and three children. It was announced he would leave his position at the club in summer 2026.

== International career ==
Houttuin played 6 games for the Netherlands national under-21 football team.
