= 1998–99 KNVB Cup =

Tournament details
- Country: Netherlands
- Teams: 61

Final positions
- Champions: Ajax
- Runners-up: Fortuna Sittard

Tournament statistics
- Top goal scorer(s): Ronald Hamming (8 goals)

The 1998–99 KNVB Cup (at the time called Amstel Cup) was the 81st edition of the Dutch national football annual knockout tournament for the KNVB Cup. 61 teams contested, beginning on 11 August 1998 and ending at the final on 13 May 1999.

Ajax successfully defended its 1998 title and successfully pursued its 14th KNVB Cup on 13 May 1999 in De Kuip, Rotterdam, defeating Fortuna Sittard, 2–0. 25,000 attended.

The Cup Winners' Cup tournament no longer existed, Ajax contested the UEFA Cup.

== Teams ==
- All 18 participants of the 1998–99 Eredivisie, six of which entering in the knock-out stage
- All 18 participants of the 1998–99 Eerste Divisie
- 23 teams from lower (amateur) leagues
- Two youth teams

== Group stage ==
The matches of the group stage were played between 11 August and 2 September 1998. 55 clubs participated, 26 advanced to the next round.

Group 1
Team	Pts
1. FC Den Bosch _{1}	10
2. RKC Waalwijk _{E}	7
3. VV Katwijk _{A}	7
4. SC Feyenoord _{A}	3
5. WSC _{A}	0

Group 2
Team	Pts
1. Fortuna Sittard _{E}	9
2. UDI'19 _{A}	4
3. Helmond Sport _{1}	4
4. RKSV Halsteren _{A}	0

Group 3
Team	Pts
1. NEC _{E}	9
2. Go Ahead Eagles _{1}	6
3. De Treffers _{A}	3
4. IJsselmeervogels _{A}	0

Group 4
Team	Pts
1. FC Twente _{E}	9
2. Heracles Almelo _{1}	4
3. Young Vitesse	3
4. AGOVV Apeldoorn _{A}	1

Group 5
Team	Pts
1. FC Utrecht _{E}	9
2. Excelsior _{1}	2
3. Telstar _{1}	2
4. Young Sparta	2

Group 6
Team	Pts
1. De Graafschap _{E}	9
2. FC Zwolle _{1}	4
3. ACV _{A}	4
4. VV Drachten _{A}	0

Group 7
Team	Pts
1. NAC Breda _{E}	12
2. VSV TONEGIDO _{A}	7
3. TOP Oss _{1}	6
4. Dordrecht'90 _{1}	4
5. SHO _{A}	0

Group 8
Team	Pts
1. Sparta _{E}	9
2. ADO Den Haag _{1}	6
3. ARC _{A}	3
4. BVV Barendrecht _{A}	0

Group 9
Team	Pts
1. Roda JC _{E}	9
2. FC Eindhoven _{1}	6
3. RBC Roosendaal _{1}	3
4. Schijndel _{A}	0

Group 10
Team	Pts
1. VVV-Venlo _{1}	7
2. MVV _{E}	7
3. VV Gemert _{A}	3
4. SV Panningen _{A}	0

Group 11
Team	Pts
1. FC Groningen _{1}	9
2. FC Emmen _{1}	6
3. VV Appingedam _{A}	1
4. SV Urk _{A}	1

Group 12
Team	Pts
1. Cambuur Leeuw. _{E}	9
2. FC Volendam _{1}	4
3. HVV Hollandia _{A}	4
4. VV Nijenrodes _{A}	0

Group 13
Team	Pts
1. AZ _{E}	9
2. Veendam _{1}	8
3. HFC Haarlem _{1}	7
4. FC Lisse _{A}	2
5. Stormvogels _{A}	1

_{E} Eredivisie; _{1} Eerste Divisie; _{A} Amateur teams

== Knock-out Stage ==
=== First round ===
The matches of the first round were played on October 27, 28 and 29, 1998. The six highest ranked Eredivisie teams from last season entered the tournament this round.

Home team	Result	Away team
Ajax _{E}	9–0	UDI '19
FC Eindhoven	3–1	FC Den Bosch
Sparta	1–1 (p: 3–4)	Cambuur Leeuw. (on November 4)
FC Utrecht	2–2 (p: 5–4)	NEC (on November 25)
Heracles Almelo	0–0 (p: 4–5)	NAC Breda (on November 28)
FC Groningen	2–0	VSV TONEGIDO (on December 1)
FC Emmen	3–2	sc Heerenveen _{E} (on December 9)
Excelsior	0–5	PSV _{E} (on December 15)

Home team	Result	Away team
Feyenoord _{E}	2–1 (aet)	ADO Den Haag (on October 20)
AZ	3–1	MVV
FC Twente	2–1	VVV-Venlo
Fortuna Sittard	5–0	RKC Waalwijk
Vitesse Arnhem _{E}	3–0	FC Volendam
Roda JC	2–1	Veendam
Go Ahead Eagles	3–2	De Graafschap
Willem II _{E}	0–2	FC Zwolle

_{E} six Eredivisie entrants

=== Round of 16 ===
The matches of the round of 16 were played on February 2, 3 and 4, 1999.

Home team	Result	Away team
Vitesse Arnhem	4–0	NAC Breda
FC Twente	2–5	Fortuna Sittard
FC Emmen	2–0	Cambuur Leeuwarden
PSV	2–0	AZ
FC Zwolle	5–2	Go Ahead Eagles
FC Eindhoven	2–1	FC Groningen
FC Utrecht	1–2	Feyenoord
Roda JC	0–3	Ajax

=== Quarter finals ===
The quarter finals were played on March 9 and 10, 1999.

Home team	Result	Away team
Fortuna Sittard	3–1	FC Emmen
FC Eindhoven	0–5	PSV
Feyenoord	2–1 (aet)	Vitesse Arnhem
FC Zwolle	1–2	Ajax (on March 24)

=== Semi-finals ===
The semi-finals were played on April 13 and 14, 1999.

Home team	Result	Away team
PSV	1–3	Fortuna Sittard
Ajax	2–1	Feyenoord

=== Final ===
The final was played on May 13, 1999.

13 May 1999
12:00 (CEST)

Ajax	2–0	Fortuna Sittard
Grønkjær 12', 15'

De Kuip, Rotterdam
Attendance: 25,000
Referee: Jaap Uilenberg

Ajax	Fortuna Sittard

GK	1	(Netherlands) Edwin van der Sar
LB	37	(Netherlands) Tim de Cler
CB	15	(Nigeria) Sunday Oliseh
CB	8	(Netherlands) Richard Witschge
RB	19	(Netherlands) Mario Melchiot
CM	10	(Finland) Jari Litmanen (c)
CM	18	(Poland) Andrzej Rudy
CM	22	(Netherlands) Peter Hoekstra
LW	22	(Denmark) Jesper Grønkjær
RW	25	(Brazil) Wamberto	(substituted off) 26'
FW	22	(Georgia (country)) Shota Arveladze
Substitutes:
FW		(South Africa) Benni McCarthy	(substituted on) 26'
Manager:
(Netherlands) Jan Wouters

GK	(Netherlands) Arno van Zwam (c)
LB	(Netherlands) Edwin Hermans
CB	(Netherlands) Kevin Hofland	(yellow card) 90'
CB	(Netherlands) Robert Roest
RB	(Netherlands) Ervin Lee	(yellow card) 72'
CM	(Czech Republic) Jaromir Paciorek
CM	(Netherlands) Ruud Kool
LM	(Netherlands) Wilfred Bouma		(substituted off) 72'
RM	(Netherlands) Francois Gesthuizen		(substituted off) 52'
FW	(Netherlands) Regillio Simons
FW	(England) Michael Jeffrey
Substitutes:
FW	(Netherlands) Ronald Hamming		(substituted on) 52'
RW	(Netherlands) Marco Heering		(substituted on) 72'
Manager:
(Netherlands) Bert van Marwijk

The Cup Winners' Cup tournament no longer existed, Ajax would now play in the UEFA Cup.
