= Erwin Koen =

Dutch footballer

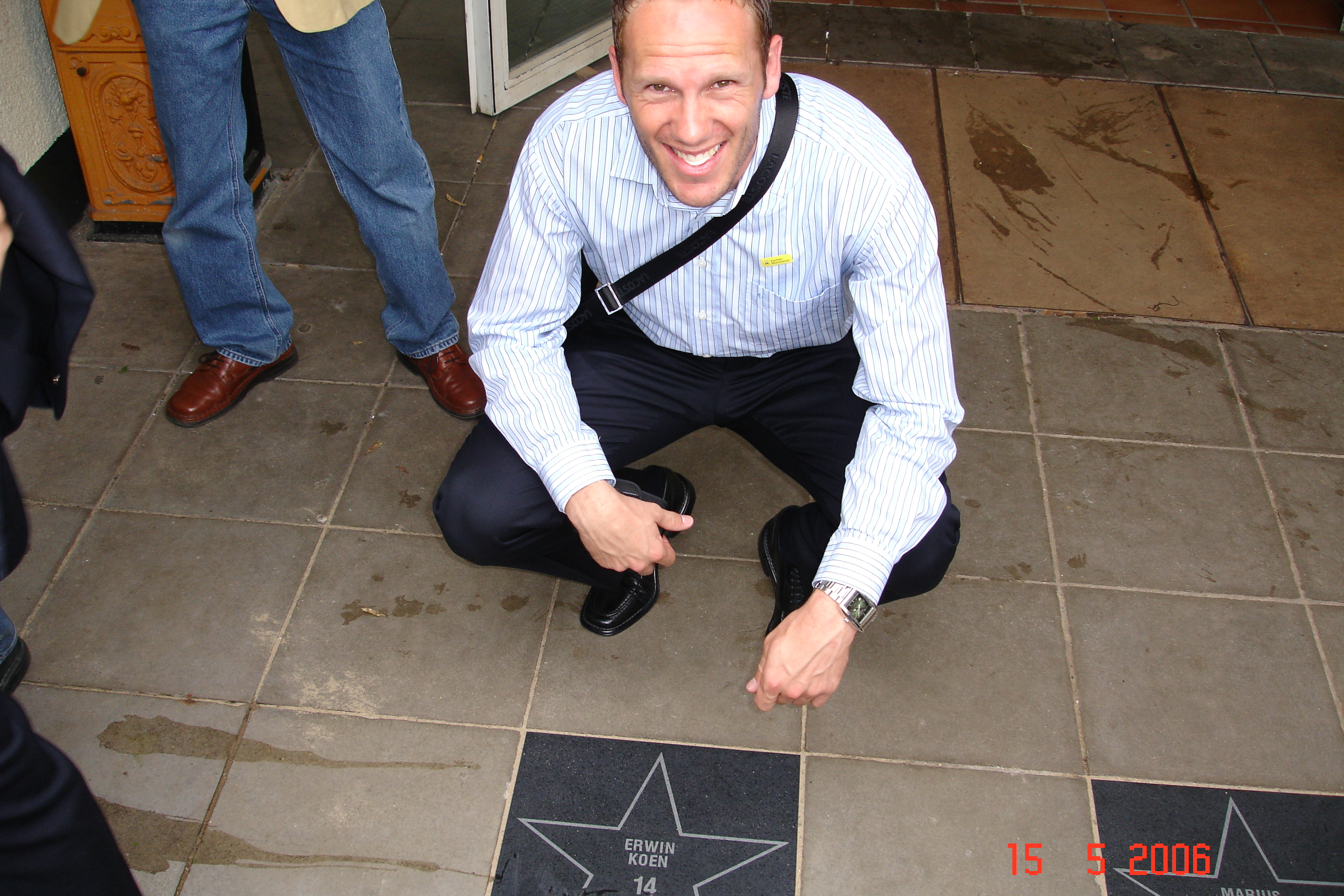
- Erwin Koen

Personal information
- Date of birth: 7 September 1978 (age 48)
- Place of birth: Den Helder, Netherlands
- Height: 1.86 m (6 ft 1 in)
- Position: Striker

Senior career*
Years	Team	Apps	(Gls)
1996–1999	Groningen	36	(2)
1999	FC Gütersloh	21	(2)
2000	SC Göttingen 05	12	(4)
2000–2005	Rot-Weiss Essen	143	(36)
2005–2008	Alemannia Aachen	19	(1)
2006–2008	SC Paderborn	48	(10)
2008–2009	Wehen Wiesbaden	14	(2)
2009–2010	Telstar	28	(4)
2010–2011	De Treffers	26	(9)
2011–2012	JVC Cuijk	15	(3)

International career
- Netherlands U21
- * Club domestic league appearances and goals

Erwin Koen (born 7 September 1978) is a Dutch former footballer who played as a striker. Most of his career he played in the 2. Bundesliga.
