= Ruud Kool =

Dutch footballer

Personal information
- Date of birth: 1 November 1966 (age 59)
- Place of birth: Abbekerk, Netherlands
- Position: Midfielder

Senior career*
Years	Team	Apps	(Gls)
1988–1991	AZ Alkmaar		
1991–1995	FC Twente	114	(10)
1995–2001	Fortuna Sittard	151	(8)
2001–2002	VVV Venlo		
- * Club domestic league appearances and goals as of 5 September 2016

Ruud Kool (born 1 November 1966) is a retired Dutch footballer who played as a midfielder for AZ Alkmaar, FC Twente, Fortuna Sittard and VVV Venlo.
