= Milan Berck Beelenkamp =

Dutch footballer (born 1977)

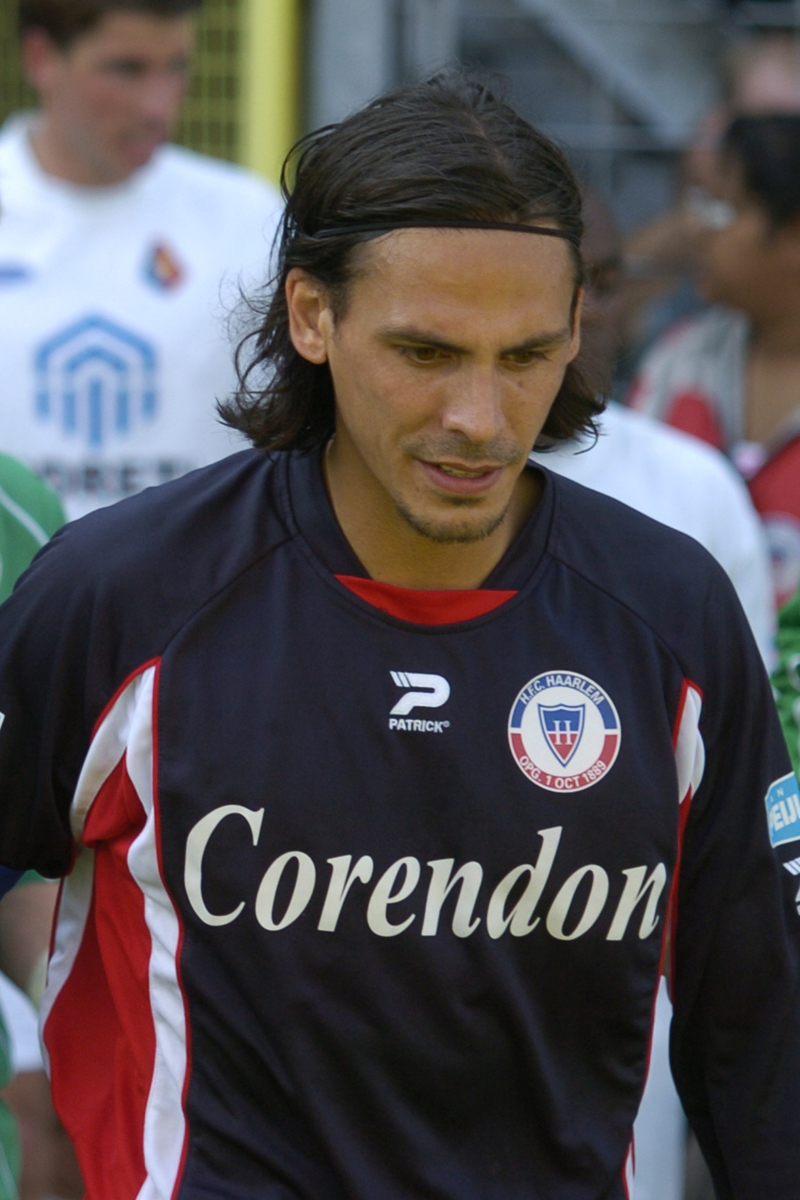

Personal information
- Full name: Milan Berck Beelenkamp
- Date of birth: 17 September 1977 (age 49)
- Place of birth: Haarlem, Netherlands
- Height: 1.78 m (5 ft 10 in)
- Position: Defender

Youth career
- Zandvoortmeeuwen
- Ajax

Senior career*
Years	Team	Apps	(Gls)
1996–1997	Ajax	2	(0)
1998	Volendam	18	(0)
1998–1999	Genoa	14	(0)
1999–2005	De Graafschap	161	(5)
2005	Mechelen	13	(0)
2006–2010	Haarlem	108	(3)
2010–2013	ARC		
2013–2015	IJVV Stormvogels		
2015–2018	Zandvoort		
- * Club domestic league appearances and goals

Milan Berck Beelenkamp (born 17 September 1977) is a Dutch former professional footballer who played as a right back.

He has formerly played for various clubs. The most well known being Ajax and Genoa.

== Club career ==
Berck Beelenkamp played only two matches for Ajax. After one year, he moved to FC Volendam. In 1998, he was signed by Italian Serie B club Genoa CFC. His return to the Netherlands came within a year, where he joined De Graafschap. Berck Beelenkamp played six seasons at De Vijverberg.

After his contract expired in 2005, he shortly played for Mechelen in Belgium. He left before the season was over, this time joining hometown club, HFC Haarlem.

After Haarlem's bankruptcy, he decided to turn his back to professional football, joining third division side, ARC in March 2010. He moved to Stormvogels in summer 2013 and to SV Zandvoort in 2015.
