= Ole Tobiasen =

Danish footballer (born 1975)

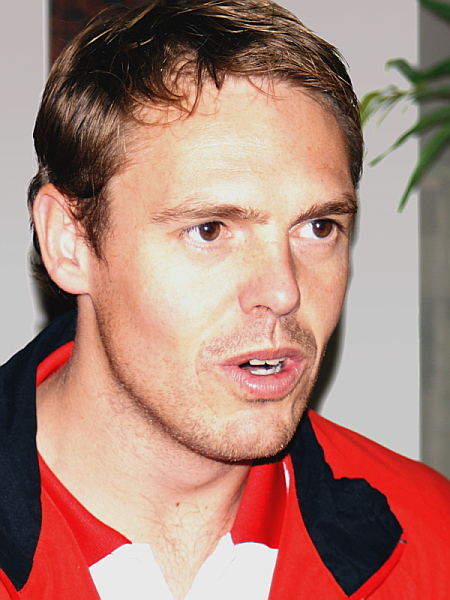

Personal information
- Date of birth: 8 July 1975 (age 51)
- Place of birth: Amager, Denmark
- Height: 1.90 m (6 ft 3 in)
- Position: Defender

Team information
- Current team: Heerenveen (assistant manager)

Youth career
- B 1908
- Fremad Amager
- KB

Senior career*
| Years | Team | Apps | (Gls) |
| 1992–1995 | FC Copenhagen | 46 | (0) |
| 1996–1997 | Heerenveen | 34 | (1) |
| 1997–2002 | Ajax | 24 | (2) |
| 2002 | AZ | 13 | (1) |
| 2003–2005 | F.C. Copenhagen | 61 | (4) |
| 2005 | → AaB (loan) | 13 | (1) |
| 2006 | Sandefjord | 24 | (1) |
| 2007–2010 | MVV | 84 | (10) |
| 2010–2011 | EHC Hoensbroek | | |
| Total | | 316 | (20) |

International career
| 1992–1993 | Denmark U19 | 5 | (0) |
| 1994–1997 | Denmark U21 | 19 | (0) |
| 1997–1998 | Denmark | 6 | (1) |

Managerial career
- 2010: MVV (youth)
- 2011–2012: Roda (youth)
- 2012–2014: EHC Hoensbroek
- 2015–2016: NAC Breda U19
- 2016–2018: Sparta Rotterdam (assistant)
- 2018–2019: Almere City (assistant)
- 2019–2021: Almere City
- 2021–2022: Heerenveen (assistant)
- 2022: Heerenveen (caretaker)
- 2022–: Heerenveen (assistant)
- * Club domestic league appearances and goals

Ole Tobiasen (born 8 July 1975) is a Danish football manager and former player. He is an assistant manager with the Dutch club Heerenven.

As a player, Tobiasen played as a right-back or centre-back for a number of clubs in Denmark, the Netherlands, and Norway. He most prominently won the Eredivisie championship with Ajax and the Danish Superliga championship with F.C. Copenhagen. Tobiasen was capped six times for the Denmark national team.

== Club career ==
Tobiasen started his career with lower-league clubs B 1908, Fremad Amager, and KB in the Copenhagen area, before joining Danish Superliga club F.C. Copenhagen (FCK) in 1992. He made his senior debut for FCK in a June 1993 match against Pogoń Szczecin in the 1993 Intertoto Cup, and made his Superliga debut in April 1994. He was praised for his marking of Mark Strudal in FCK's 2–1 victory against Brøndby IF on 24 April, and Tobiasen established himself as a central defender in the 3–5–2 formation of manager Benny Johansen.

In February 1996, Tobiasen moved on to the Dutch Eredivisie club SC Heerenveen, as he hoped to emulate the success of fellow Dane Jon Dahl Tomasson. Tobiasen had initially agreed a free transfer move effective from his contract expiry in summer 1996. Following FCK director Karsten Aabrink's public outrage that FCK was not informed of the deal beforehand, FCK and Heerenveen agreed a transfer fee in excess of DKK500,000 to allow Tobiasen an immediate transfer. At Heerenveen, he adapted to a new position as a right full back. After one-and-a-half years and 34 matches for Heerenveen, fellow Eredivisie team Ajax Amsterdam spotted his talent.

Ajax' Danish manager Morten Olsen brought Tobiasen into his squad for the 1997–98 Eredivisie season. He joined the club in June 1997, as Ajax reportedly paid a DKK7.5 million transfer fee. Having immediately established himself in the starting line-up, Tobiasen suffered a knee injury in November 1997, and did not return to fitness until July 1998. He managed to play 13 games and score two goals as Ajax won the 1997–98 Eredivisie championship that season. He also won the 1998 and 1999 Dutch Cup trophies with the club. In November 1998, Tobiasen suffered another knee injury, and following several recurring knee problems, he would not play another Eredivisie game for Ajax.

Tobiasen underwent a long period of injury lay-off, sitting in the stands for three full seasons, from 1999 to 2002. When his contract ran out in summer 2002, Tobiasen moved to Eredivisie rivals AZ Alkmaar on a one-year contract. He established himself in the right back position, and played 13 matches in the first half of the 2002–03 Eredivisie season. In January 2003, he returned to his former club F.C. Copenhagen.

Back at FCK, he was set to compete with Swedish international Tomas Antonelius for the right back position. Following new injury problems, Tobiasen eventually found centre back Bo Svensson had taken over the right back position for the remaining 2002–03 Danish Superliga season, as FCK won the championship. For the following season, Tobiasen reclaimed the right back position, but as FCK brought in new right back Lars Jacobsen in January 2004, Tobiasen eventually settled as a central defender. Tobiasen played 26 of 33 games as FCK won the 2003–04 Danish Superliga championship, and he also helped the club win the 2004 Danish Cup Final by beating AaB 1–0.

In the summer 2005 transfer window, Tobiasen was loaned out to AaB for six months, where he played regularly in the central defender position through the first half of the 2005–06 Danish Superliga season. When his FCK contract expired in January 2006, Tobiasen signed a one-year contract with newly promoted Norwegian Premier League team Sandefjord. He played 24 games, as Sandefjord finished the 2006 Norwegian Premier League season in 9th place. Tobiasen left Sandefjord as his contract ran out in December 2006.

In February 2007, Tobiasen returned to the Netherlands and joined MVV Maastricht in the second-tier Eerste Divisie league. In September 2009, Tobiasen had a dispute with MVV coach Fuat Çapa, as he had arranged a vote of confidence in Çapa amongst the players, and Tobiasen was suspended from the team. Even as Çapa was later fired, Tobiasen did not return to the first team. MVV was contractually obligated to offer him a position in the technical staff upon the expiry of his playing contract in summer 2010, but did not honor the obligation. Instead, Tobiasen agreed to become youth team coach at Roda JC and played in the 2010–11 season at Hoofdklasse side EHC Hoensbroek before retiring from the game.

== International career ==
Following his breakthrough for FCK, Tobiasen was called up for the Denmark U21 national team in July 1994. He played a total 24 games for under-19 and under-21 teams, and also represented the Denmark XI for a single game in April 1996.

After his move to Ajax, Tobiasen was called up for the Denmark senior national team. He made his international debut against Croatia in September 1997, earning him rave reviews. He featured in the Danish qualification campaigns for the 1998 FIFA World Cup and Euro 2000, but due to injury he missed out on both final tournaments. He was often seen raiding up the sideline from his right back position. He scored his only international goal in the 1–1 draw with Switzerland in October 1998, which was to be his last game for Denmark. Tobiasen earned a total six caps for his country, before his persisting injury problems saw him dropped from the team.

== Coaching career ==
In the 2021–22 season, he started as the assistant manager at Heerenveen and was appointed interim manager for the remainder of the season on 4 February 2022, after the dismissal of Manager Johnny Jansen. He returned to the assistant position for the 2022–23 season.

== Honours ==
Copenhagen

- Superliga: 1992–93, 2002–03, 2003–04
- Danish Cup: 1994–95, 2003–04
- Danish Super Cup: 1995, 2004

Ajax

- Eredivisie: 1997–98
- KNVB Cup: 1997–98, 1998–99
