= Dani (footballer, born 1976) =

Portuguese footballer (born 1976)

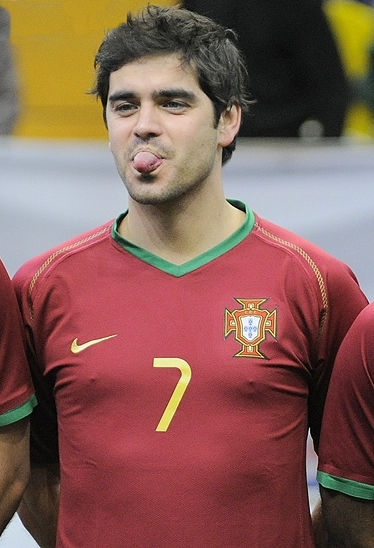
- Dani in 2011

Personal information
- Full name: Daniel da Cruz Carvalho
- Date of birth: 2 November 1976 (age 49)
- Place of birth: Lisbon, Portugal
- Height: 1.82 m (6 ft 0 in)
- Position: Attacking midfielder

Youth career
- 1985–1995: Sporting CP

Senior career*
Years	Team	Apps	(Gls)
1995–1996	Sporting CP	9	(0)
1996	→ West Ham United (loan)	9	(2)
1996–2000	Ajax	72	(12)
2000	Benfica	5	(0)
2001–2003	Atlético Madrid	64	(10)
Total		159	(24)

International career
1992	Portugal U15	8	(4)
1992–1993	Portugal U16	15	(6)
1993	Portugal U17	6	(4)
1994	Portugal U18	8	(6)
1995–1996	Portugal U20	15	(6)
1995–1998	Portugal U21	11	(6)
1996	Portugal U23	6	(0)
1995–2000	Portugal	9	(0)
Medal record
Men's football
Representing Portugal
FIFA U-20 World Cup
Third place	1995 Qatar
- * Club domestic league appearances and goals

Daniel da Cruz Carvalho (born 2 November 1976), commonly known as Dani, is a Portuguese former professional footballer who played mainly as an attacking midfielder.

He spent most of his eight-year professional career with Ajax after starting out at Sporting CP, appearing in nearly 100 competitive matches and winning three major titles. He also competed abroad in England with West Ham United, and in Spain with Atlético Madrid.

All youth levels comprised, Dani played 69 times for Portugal and scored 33 goals. He made his full debut in 1995.

== Club career ==
A talented attacking player whose career was cut short due to a poor work ethic, Dani was born in Lisbon and began his career with local club Sporting CP, making his first-team debut during 1994–95 aged just 17, in a team which also included Luís Figo, Ricardo Sá Pinto and Bulgarian Krassimir Balakov, and helped the side to that season's Taça de Portugal.

In January 1996, Dani started a small loan in the Premier League with West Ham United, where he scored at Tottenham Hotspur and at home against Manchester City. Despite performing reasonably well during his tenure, his season ended when he was fired by manager Harry Redknapp when he missed training after being spotted in a nightclub.

Subsequently, Dani represented Ajax, appearing regularly for the Amsterdam side but almost never as an undisputed starter. He did score an important goal in the 1996–97 UEFA Champions League quarter-final tie against Atlético Madrid, in a 3–2 away win (4–3 aggregate).

In December 2000, following a brief spell with Benfica, Dani signed for Atlético Madrid of the Spanish Segunda División on the recommendation of his compatriot Paulo Futre, the latter's director of football, teaming up with also-Portuguese Hugo Leal. After the Colchoneros returned to La Liga with him as an important unit, he was pretty much absent for the majority of the 2002–03 campaign and, having failed to find a new team, definitively retired from football in early 2004 at only 27.

== International career ==
Dani earned nine caps for Portugal, the first coming on 12 December 1995 in a 1–1 friendly with England, and the last on 29 March 2000 in a 2–1 victory over Denmark (also friendly).

Previously, he appeared for the under-20 national team at the 1995 FIFA World Youth Championship in Qatar, being awarded the second place in both the Golden Boot and Golden Ball awards, and also competed at the 1996 Summer Olympics where his country finished fourth.

== Personal life ==
Before and during his playing career, Dani worked regularly as a model. After retiring, he worked in television, including as a pundit for TVI 24.

Dani married Patrícia Claro in 2009. The couple had two daughters, Maria Luísa (born 2011) and Benedita (2015).

Redknapp, when he was manager at West Ham, once said about the player: "Dani is so good-looking I don't know whether to play him or fuck him".

== Honours ==
Sporting CP

- Taça de Portugal: 1994–95

Ajax

- Eredivisie: 1997–98
- KNVB Cup: 1997–98, 1998–99

Atlético Madrid

- Segunda División: 2001–02

Portugal

- UEFA European Under-18 Championship: 1994
- FIFA U-20 World Cup third place: 1995

Individual

- FIFA U-20 World Cup Silver Ball: 1995
- FIFA U-20 World Cup Bronze Boot: 1995
