= Andriy Demchenko =

Ukrainian-Russian footballer

Personal information
- Full name: Andriy Anatoliyovych Demchenko
- Date of birth: 20 August 1976 (age 50)
- Place of birth: Zaporizhzhia, Ukrainian SSR, Soviet Union (now Ukraine)
- Height: 1.82 m (6 ft 0 in)
- Positions: Attacking midfielder; forward

Team information
- Current team: Iberia 1999 (manager)

Senior career*
Years	Team	Apps	(Gls)
1992–1994	CSKA Moscow	0	(0)
1992–1994	→ CSKA-d Moscow	53	(19)
1995–1998	Ajax	4	(0)
1997	→ CSKA Moscow (loan)	9	(2)
1998–2006	Metalurh Zaporizhzhia	186	(46)
1998–2006	→ Metalurh-2 Zaporizhzhia	11	(1)
2000	→ SSSOR-Metalurh Zaporizhzhia	1	(2)
2007–2008	Illichivets Mariupol	18	(4)
2008–2009	Obolon Kyiv	23	(2)
2009	Dacia Chişinău	1	(0)
2010	Metalurh Zaporizhzhia	1	(0)
2010	Helios Kharkiv	11	(0)
Total		317	(76)

International career
1994	Russia U19	1	(1)
1995	Russia U20	2	(0)
1995–1997	Russia U21	14	(7)

Managerial career
- 2012–2015: Metalurh Zaporizhzhia (youth)
- 2017–2018: Obod
- 2018: Veres Rivne (caretaker)
- 2018: Lviv
- 2019–2020: Metalist 1925 Kharkiv
- 2021–2023: Dila Gori
- 2023–2024: Dinamo Batumi
- 2025: Zhenis
- 2026: Araz-Naxçıvan
- 2026–: Iberia 1999
- * Club domestic league appearances and goals

Andriy Anatoliyovych Demchenko (Ukrainian: Андрій Анатолійович Демченко; born 20 August 1976) is a Ukrainian professional football manager and former player who played as an attacking midfielder or forward. He is currently the manager of Erovnuli Liga club Iberia 1999.

== Club career ==
Demchenko started out in his native Zaporizhzhia, where his first coaches were Borys Zozulya and Viktor Vysochyn. When Demchenko turned 13, his new trainer was Anatoliy Vasyleha who coached him before Demchenko moved to Moscow. During his teenage years, Demchenko was spotted by Gennadiy Kostylev, a Soviet Union national team coach, and Demchenko participated in some international tournaments among junior teams. During dissolution of the Soviet Union, in 1990 Demchenko was invited as a prospect player to play for CSKA Moscow where Kostylev also became the club's manager.

At the 1994 UEFA European Under-18 Championship, Demchenko, playing for the Russia national team, became a top scorer of the tournament. Following the tournament, Ajax offered CSKA Moscow $1 million for the 17-year-old Demchenko, and both player and club agreed. At Ajax, Demchenko mostly sat on the bench and had limited amount of playing experience. Following end of contract with the Dutch club, he returned to Zaporizhzhia where he joined Metalurh Zaporizhzhia.

== Managerial career ==
In early 2021, Demchenko signed a two-year deal with Erovnuli Liga club Dila, extended to another year in December 2022. He guided the team to the third place twice and the third round of UEFA Conference League before being appointed at Dinamo Batumi in August 2023. At the end of the season, he was selected Manager of the Year as his team secured the second league title in three years.

On 4 January 2026, Azerbaijan Premier League club Araz-Naxçıvan PFK signed a contract with Demchenko for the position of head coach for a term of 5 months, with an option for another year.”

In June 2026, Demchenko returned to Georgia to take charge of the defending champions Iberia 1999.

== Honours ==
=== Player ===
Ajax

- Eredivisie: 1995–96, 1997–98
- KNVB Cup: 1997–98
- Intercontinental Cup: 1995
- UEFA Super Cup: 1995

=== Manager ===
Dinamo Batumi

- Erovnuli Liga: 2023
- Erovnuli Liga Manager of the Year: 2023
