= Urvin Lee =

Dutch footballer (born 1973)

Ervin Lee
Personal information
- Date of birth: 18 August 1973 (age 53)
- Place of birth: Amsterdam, Netherlands
- Position: Defender

Senior career*
Years	Team	Apps	(Gls)
1991–1994	HFC Haarlem	59	(0)
1994–1999	Fortuna Sittard	105	(0)
1999–2002	AZ Alkmaar	73	(0)
2002–2003	Stormvogels		
2003–2004	DOVO		
2004–2005	FC Lisse		
2005–2006	Blauw Wit Beursbengels		
2006–2007	DOVO		
2007–2008	DVS '33		
2008–2009	FC Türkiyemspor		
2009	SV Huizen		
- * Club domestic league appearances and goals as of 2 September 2016

Urvin Lee (born 18 August 1973 in Amsterdam, Netherlands), sometimes written as Ervin Lee, is a Dutch footballer who played for several clubs in the Dutch Eerste Divisie and Eredivisie leagues. Lee made his Eerste Divisie debut with HFC Haarlem during the 1991–1992 season and made his debut for the Eredivisie league for club Fortuna Sittard during the 1995–1996 season. He also played for AZ Alkmaar.
