= Kevin Bobson =

Dutch footballer (born 1980)

Personal information
- Full name: Kevin Marlon Bobson
- Date of birth: 13 November 1980 (age 46)
- Place of birth: Amsterdam, Netherlands
- Height: 1.82 m (6 ft 0 in)
- Position: Forward

Youth career
- Bijlmer
- Ajax

Senior career*
Years	Team	Apps	(Gls)
1998–2001	Ajax	8	(0)
2001–2004	NAC	70	(10)
2004	Espanyol	9	(1)
2004–2008	Willem II	104	(15)
2008	→ N.E.C. (loan)	14	(2)
2008–2009	Red Bull Salzburg	3	(0)
2009	Wiltz		
- * Club domestic league appearances and goals

Kevin Marlon Bobson (born 13 November 1980) is a Dutch retired professional football winger.

== Early life and club career ==
Kevin Marlon Bobson was born on 13 November 1980 in Amsterdam. was part of the famous Ajax youth academy. He scored his first goal for Ajax in a UEFA Cup tie against Dukla Banská Bystrica in September 1999. Bobson's chances were limited at Ajax, and he moved to NAC Breda in July 2001. He scored 10 goals in 70 games for NAC, and that prompted interest from Espanyol of the Spanish La Liga to race for his signature. He only managed one goal for Espanyol (Goal number 3000 for Espanyol in Spanish La Liga) before moving back to the Netherlands to join Willem II in Tilburg in August 2004. He spent the 2007–08 season on loan with N.E.C. in Nijmegen. On 30 August 2008 he moved to Red Bull Salzburg, where he would be working again with manager Co Adriaanse, but could not break into the starting team and his contract was terminated on Bobson's initiative in January 2009. Following a stint at Luxembourg club Wiltz he had a trial with Excelsior but a move did not materialize.

Since then, he has moved into amateur football, and played for Zuidoost United from 2012.

== Personal life ==
Born in the Netherlands, Bobson is of Surinamese descent.
