= Tim de Cler =

Dutch footballer (born 1978)

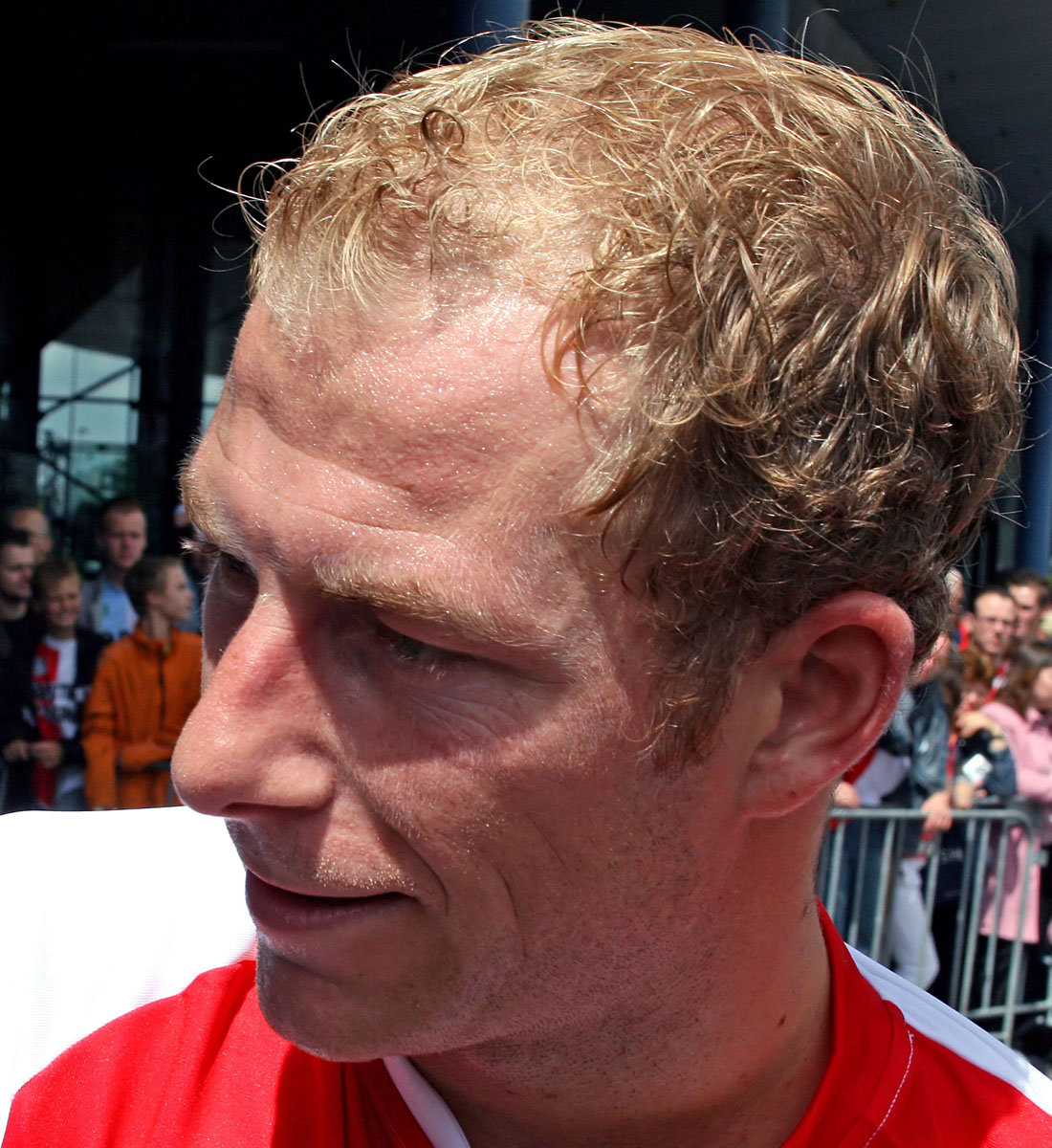
- De Cler in 2007

Personal information
- Full name: Tim de Cler
- Date of birth: 8 November 1978 (age 48)
- Place of birth: Leiden, Netherlands
- Height: 1.79 m (5 ft 10 in)
- Position: Left-back

Youth career
- Lugdunum
- Ajax

Senior career*
| Years | Team | Apps | (Gls) |
| 1997–2002 | Ajax | 75 | (2) |
| 2002–2007 | AZ | 157 | (4) |
| 2007–2011 | Feyenoord | 87 | (1) |
| 2011–2013 | AEK Larnaca | 41 | (0) |
| Total | | 361 | (8) |

International career
| 2005–2008 | Netherlands | 17 | (0) |
- * Club domestic league appearances and goals

Tim de Cler (born 8 November 1978) is a Dutch former professional footballer who played as a left-back for Ajax, AZ, Feyenoord and AEK Larnaca.

== Early life ==
De Cler is born and raised in Leiden, South Holland. In Leiden, he grew up in a neighbourhood with 15–20 boys around the same age. Together with his brother Henk, he was found on the streets playing football constantly.

== Club career ==
=== Lugdunum ===
At age six, De Cler joined his first football team, amateur side Lugdunum. There he played as a centre-back until age 12. Ajax showed interest in him and, despite him supporting Feyenoord, joined their rival's world-famous youth academy.

=== Ajax ===
At Ajax, De Cler played at first as a left winger, but eventually he was positioned as a left-back when he reached the A-level in youth football. He was offered his first professional contract and joined Ajax's second team. Occasionally, he was added to the first team squad to train with the elite at the club.

On 23 April 1998, De Cler made his professional debut in a 6–1 home win over Willem II. Two days later, he played another match with the second team and he broke his tibia, which sidelined him for four months. That season, Ajax won both the Eredivisie and the KNVB Cup, and although these were De Cler's first official trophies, there were mixed feelings due to his injury. Once he was declared fit again, his tibia was struck by a ball and he was sidelined for another four months. He rejoined the Ajax first team squad after he was declared fit for the second time. The KNVB Cup won by Ajax in 1999 offered him much more joy than the title won the year prior.

During his time at Ajax, De Cler had tough competition from fellow defenders Cristian Chivu, John O'Brien and Maxwell, but nonetheless managed to play many matches. In his final year at the club, he won both the Eredivisie and the KNVB Cup for the second and third time respectively.

=== AZ ===
De Cler left Ajax in the summer of 2002 to join AZ, at the time a mid-table club. In his first season, AZ finished in the tenth position in the Eredivisie, however prospects changed when Co Adriaanse was appointed the side's manager in 2003. Under Adriaanse, AZ nearly secured European football in his first season. It was the start of a unique period in which AZ found themselves improving among the three historical giant teams in the Netherlands and even in Europe; that is, Ajax, Feyenoord and PSV. In 2005, AZ unexpectedly reached the UEFA Cup semi-finals, only to be beaten on away goals by Sporting CP. De Cler was also named to Marco van Basten's squad for the 2006 FIFA World Cup. During the World Cup, he played one match, the goalless draw against Argentina.

In his last year at AZ, during the 2006–07 season, AZ could claim the Eredivisie championship at the last matchday as they were equal on points with both Ajax and PSV. However, AZ had the superior goal difference and would have been the champions should all clubs stay equal on points. Where Ajax and PSV both won their final match of the season AZ lost theirs against Excelsior and finished in third position as a result. They also reached the final of the KNVB Cup, but were again denied the trophy as Ajax won the cup after a penalty shoot-out.

=== Feyenoord ===
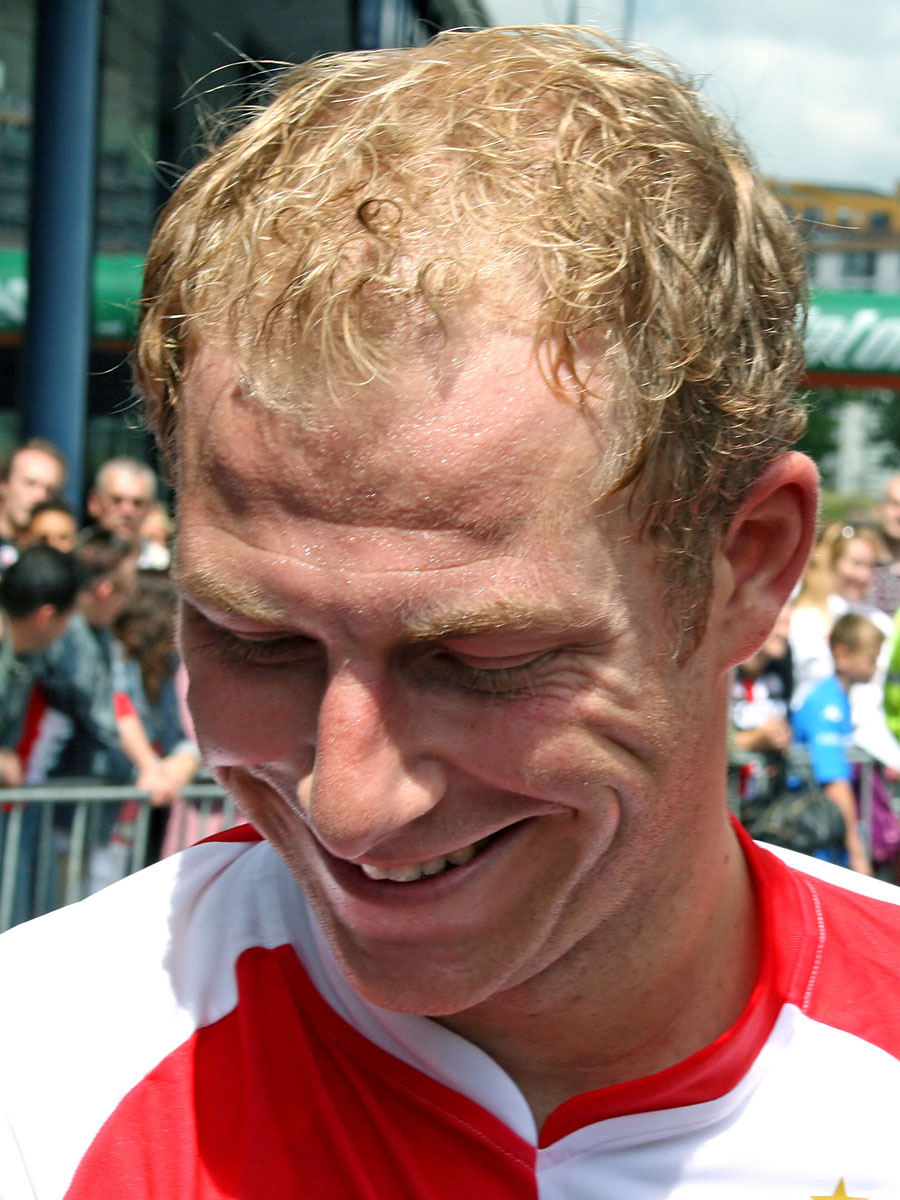
De Cler with Feyenoord in 2007

After five years at AZ, De Cler felt it was time for a change. Both PSV and Feyenoord showed interest. His agent Rob Jansen, who also works with Roy Makaay and Kevin Hofland, made a unique effort to discuss the future of his players with them, each other and their future club Feyenoord to bring them all together at the club. Also Sigi Lens the agent of Giovanni van Bronckhorst was a part of the deal and when manager Bert van Marwijk signed his contract as the new Feyenoord manager, all these players were contracted within a few weeks time span.

=== AEK Larnaca ===
Having parted company with Feyenoord, De Cler signed a two-year contract with the Cypriot First Division side AEK Larnaca on 30 June 2011 following a suggestion from the club's head coach, Jordi Cruyff.

After finishing his professional career in 2013, De Cler returned to his youth club Lugdunum.

== International career ==
De Cler represented the Netherlands national team. He had been a regular member of the Dutch national team since Marco van Basten took over as coach in August 2004 and was selected for the 2006 FIFA World Cup and UEFA Euro 2008.

== Career statistics ==
=== Club ===
Appearances and goals by club, season and competition
| Club | Season | League | | | Cup | | Continental | | Total | |
| Club | Season | Division | Apps | Goals | Apps | Goals | Apps | Goals | Apps | Goals |
|---|---|---|---|---|---|---|---|---|---|---|
| Ajax | 1997–98 | Eredivisie | 1 | 0 | 0 | 0 | 0 | 0 | 1 | 0 |
| Ajax | 1998–99 | Eredivisie | 12 | 0 | 0 | 0 | 0 | 0 | 12 | 0 |
| Ajax | 1999–2000 | Eredivisie | 21 | 0 | 0 | 0 | 0 | 0 | 21 | 0 |
| Ajax | 2000–01 | Eredivisie | 25 | 2 | 0 | 0 | 0 | 0 | 25 | 2 |
| Ajax | 2001–02 | Eredivisie | 16 | 0 | 0 | 0 | 0 | 0 | 16 | 0 |
| Ajax | Total | | 75 | 2 | 0 | 0 | 0 | 0 | 75 | 2 |
| AZ | 2002–03 | Eredivisie | 30 | 2 | 0 | 0 | 0 | 0 | 30 | 2 |
| AZ | 2003–04 | Eredivisie | 33 | 0 | 0 | 0 | 0 | 0 | 33 | 0 |
| AZ | 2004–05 | Eredivisie | 32 | 1 | 0 | 0 | 12 | 0 | 44 | 1 |
| AZ | 2005–06 | Eredivisie | 30 | 0 | 0 | 0 | 7 | 0 | 37 | 0 |
| AZ | 2006–07 | Eredivisie | 32 | 1 | 0 | 0 | 11 | 0 | 43 | 1 |
| AZ | Total | | 157 | 4 | 0 | 0 | 30 | 0 | 187 | 4 |
| Feyenoord | 2007–08 | Eredivisie | 32 | 1 | 0 | 0 | 0 | 0 | 32 | 1 |
| Feyenoord | 2008–09 | Eredivisie | 19 | 0 | 2 | 0 | 5 | 0 | 26 | 0 |
| Feyenoord | 2009–10 | Eredivisie | 7 | 0 | 3 | 0 | 0 | 0 | 10 | 0 |
| Feyenoord | 2010–11 | Eredivisie | 29 | 0 | 1 | 0 | 2 | 0 | 32 | 0 |
| Feyenoord | Total | | 87 | 1 | 6 | 0 | 7 | 0 | 100 | 1 |
| AEK Larnaca | 2011–12 | Cypriot First Division | 26 | 1 | 0 | 0 | 0 | 0 | 26 | 1 |
| AEK Larnaca | 2012–13 | Cypriot First Division | 15 | 0 | 0 | 0 | 0 | 0 | 15 | 0 |
| AEK Larnaca | Total | | 41 | 1 | 0 | 0 | 0 | 0 | 41 | 1 |
| Career total | | | 361 | 8 | 6 | 0 | 37 | 0 | 404 | 8 |

== Honours ==
Ajax

- Eredivisie: 1997–98, 2001–02
- KNVB Cup: 1998–99, 2001–02

Feyenoord

- KNVB Cup: 2007–08
