= Andrzej Rudy =

Polish footballer (born 1965)

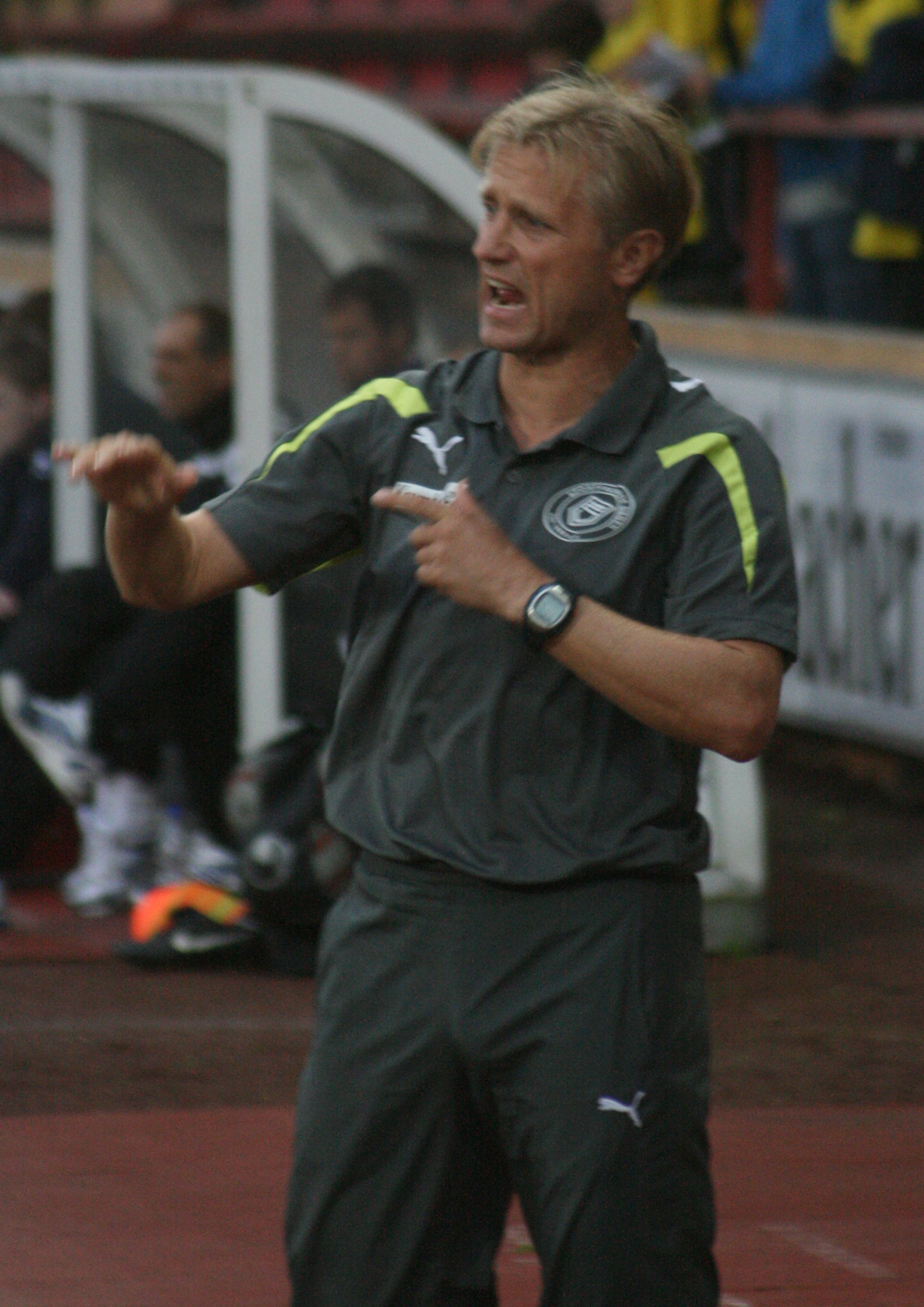

Personal information
- Date of birth: 15 October 1965 (age 61)
- Place of birth: Ścinawa, Poland
- Height: 1.73 m (5 ft 8 in)
- Position: Midfielder

Senior career*
Years	Team	Apps	(Gls)
1981–1983	Odra Ścinawa		
1983–1988	Śląsk Wrocław	107	(8)
1988–1989	GKS Katowice	13	(1)
1989–1991	1. FC Köln	43	(4)
1992	Brøndby	8	(1)
1992–1995	1. FC Köln	91	(10)
1995–1996	VfL Bochum	14	(1)
1996–1997	Lierse	21	(4)
1997–1999	Ajax	41	(3)
1999–2000	Lierse	13	(1)
2000–2001	K.V.C. Westerlo	1	(0)
2001–2002	SCB Preußen Köln		
2002–2003	Borussia Fulda		
Total		352	(33)

International career
- Poland U18
1986–1998	Poland	16	(3)

Managerial career
- 2003: SC Borussia Fulda (player-manager)
- 2004: SC Borussia Fulda
- 2004–2005: Bonner SC
- 2010–2011: Sportfreunde Siegen
Medal record
Men's football
Representing Poland
UEFA European Under-18 Championship
Third place	1984 Soviet Union
- * Club domestic league appearances and goals

Andrzej Rudy (born 15 October 1965) is a Polish former professional footballer who played as a midfielder.

== Playing career ==
Born in Ścinawa, Rudy started his career in football with Odra Ścinawa (1981–83). He debuted professionally with Śląsk Wrocław (1983–88), then switched to GKS Katowice (1988–89).

In July 1989, Rudy emigrated, joining Bundesliga side 1. FC Köln. After a short stint with Denmark's Brøndby IF (January–June 1992), he returned to Köln, remaining there until May 1995, subsequently moving to VfL Bochum in the second division (one season).

After leaving Germany, Rudy played for Lierse S.K. (1996–97, 1999–2000), AFC Ajax (1997–99) and K.V.C. Westerlo (2000–01), returning to Germany to retire, with SCB Preußen Köln (2001–02).

Between 1986–98, Rudy received 16 caps for the Poland national football team (three goals).

== Managerial career ==
As a manager, Rudy worked with Borussia Fulda (2003 as a playing manager and 2004 as a normal manager), Bonner SC (2004–05) and TSC Euskirchen (2007–08), returning in the next season to 1. FC Köln, to work within the youth system.

He was the manager of Sportfreunde Siegen from April 2010 to May 2011 and worked in a short period in January 2014 as a youth coach for TSC Euskirchen.

== Post-retirement ==
After retiring from football, Rudy found employment as a recovery driver in Cologne.

== Honours ==
Śląsk Wrocław

- Polish Cup: 1986–87

Lierse

- Belgian First Division: 1996–97

Ajax

- Eredivisie: 1997–98
- KNVB Cup: 1997–98, 1998–99

Poland U18

- UEFA European Under-18 Championship third place: 1984

Individual

- Polish Newcomer of the Year: 1985
