= Mariano Juan =

Argentine footballer (born 1976)

Personal information
- Full name: Mariano Alcides Juan
- Date of birth: 15 May 1976 (age 50)
- Place of birth: Buenos Aires, Argentina
- Height: 1.78 m (5 ft 10 in)
- Position: Midfielder

Senior career*
Years	Team	Apps	(Gls)
1994–1996	River Plate	7	(0)
1996–2000	Ajax	17	(0)
1998–1999	→ Racing Club (loan)	5	(0)
2000–2002	Getafe CF		
2002–2003	CD Toledo		
2003–2006	Huracán	84	(2)
2006–2007	CD Leganés	29	(0)

International career
1995	Argentina U20	5	(0)
- * Club domestic league appearances and goals

Mariano Alcides Juan (born 15 May 1976 in Buenos Aires) is a retired Argentine association football player who played in Argentina for River Plate, Racing and Huracán, in the Netherlands for Ajax, and in Spain for Getafe CF, CD Toledo and CD Leganés.
