= Kofi Mensah =

Dutch-Ghanaian footballer

Personal information
- Date of birth: March 8, 1978 (age 48)
- Place of birth: Koforidua, Ghana
- Height: 1.78 m (5 ft 10 in)
- Position: Defender

Youth career
- 1991–1996: AFC Ajax

Senior career*
Years	Team	Apps	(Gls)
1996–1999	AFC Ajax	21	(0)
1999–2003	NAC Breda	49	(0)
2003–2004	ADO Den Haag	14	(0)
2004–2005	Anorthosis Famagusta FC	6	(0)
2006	FC Omniworld	6	(0)

International career
1999–2000	Netherlands U-21	8	(0)
- * Club domestic league appearances and goals

Kofi Mensah (born March 8, 1978, in Koforidua, Ghana) is a former Dutch-Ghanaian footballer.

== Career ==
Mensah began his career in 1996 at AFC Ajax. After three years with the club, he moved to NAC Breda. In June 2003, he moved again to ADO Den Haag. Mensah played for Anorthosis Famagusta FC in the 2004–05, but decided to leave after he had not received two months of salary. He then tried to get a contract at FC Emmen, Helmond Sport and SC Cambuur, but in vain. In February 2006, he moved to FC Omniworld until the end of the season.

== International ==
He has played for Dutch youth selections.

== Career ==
Season	Club	Games	Goals	League
1996/97	AFC Ajax	1	0	Eredivisie
1997/98	AFC Ajax	5	0	Eredivisie
1998/99	AFC Ajax	15	0	Eredivisie
1999/00	AFC Ajax	0	0	Eredivisie
	NAC Breda	11	0	Eerste Divisie
2000/01	NAC Breda	14	0	Eredivisie
2001/02	NAC Breda	13	0	Eredivisie
2002/03	NAC Breda	11	0	Eredivisie
2003/04	ADO Den Haag	14	0	Eredivisie
2004/05	Anorthosis Famagusta FC	6	0	Cyprus First Division
2005/06	FC Omniworld	6	0	Eerste Divisie
Total		96	0	
