= Richard Knopper =

Dutch footballer

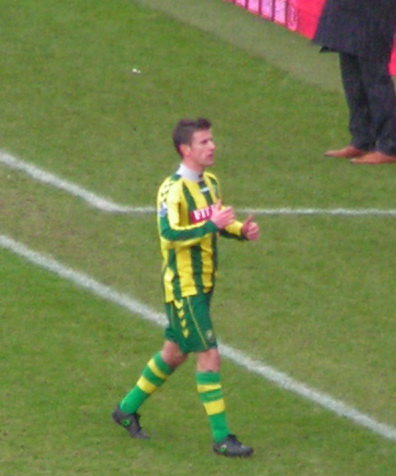
- Knopper playing for Den Haag in 2009

Personal information
- Date of birth: 29 August 1977 (age 49)
- Place of birth: Rijswijk, Netherlands
- Height: 1.77 m (5 ft 10 in)
- Position: Attacking midfielder

Youth career
- 1984–1988: RVC Rijswijk
- 1988–1993: Feyenoord
- 1993–1997: Ajax

Senior career*
Years	Team	Apps	(Gls)
1997–2004	Ajax	67	(19)
2002–2003	→ Aris (loan)	21	(1)
2003–2004	→ Heerenveen (loan)	32	(9)
2004–2006	Vitesse	47	(8)
2006–2010	ADO Den Haag	85	(17)
2010–2011	PSM Makassar	18	(3)
2011–2012	Haaglandia	15	(3)
Total		285	(60)

Managerial career
- 2013–2014: ADO Den Haag (U18)
- 2014–2015: ADO Den Haag (U15)
- 2015–2016: ADO Den Haag (U17)
- 2015–2016: Netherlands U16 (assistant)
- 2016–2018: Ajax (U16/U15)
- 2018–2020: Ajax (U-18)
- 2020: ADO Den Haag (assistant)
- * Club domestic league appearances and goals

Richard Knopper (born 29 August 1977) is a Dutch former professional footballer who played as an attacking midfielder.

== Club career ==
Born in Rijswijk, Knopper began his career with Feyenoord but, still in his youth, moved to rivals Ajax, making his official debut in November 1997 against Sparta Rotterdam. In 1999, he was voted by club supporters as Most Talented Player, receiving the Marco van Basten Trophy; the following year he scored 15 Eredivisie goals as a midfielder, but his team could only finish fifth.

A regular under Jan Wouters, Knopper saw his playing time reduce when Co Adriaanse took over as head coach in 2000. He was sidelined with injury for almost the entire season, playing only eight matches that year and appearing slightly more in the following, which would be his last.

In May 2002, Knopper had a trial with Premier League side Sunderland and played in that predicament in the testimonial match for Niall Quinn with the Republic of Ireland on the 14th. From 2002 to 2004, he went out on two loans, first with Greece's Aris and then with Heerenveen, slightly reviving his career with the latter; upon his Ajax release in summer 2004, he spent two additional campaigns with Vitesse, appearing regularly.

After some problems with Vitesse manager Aad de Mos, Knopper was forced to leave and joined ADO Den Haag. In July 2007 a three-year contract was agreed, with the player netting again in double figures (ten) in 2008–09, crucial to help in a narrow escape from relegation; in the 2010 summer, aged 33, he was released.

In January 2011, Knopper moved to Liga Primer Indonesia club PSM Makassar, leaving after a couple of months and signing with lowly Haaglandia back in his country, where he ended his career.

== Managerial career ==
=== ADO Den Haag and KNVB ===
In January 2012, Knopper was hired as an account manager at his former club ADO Den Haag. From the end of May 2013, Knopper was also coaching the club's U-18 squad. In February 2014, he left the position as account manager, but continued coaching the U-18 squad.

From the 2014–15 season, Knopper took charge of ADO's U-15 squad and in the 2015–16 season, of the U-17 squad. At the end of August 2015, Knopper was also hired as assistant coach for the Dutch U-16 national team.

Knopper left both the position at ADO and at the national team, in the summer 2016.

=== Ajax ===
In May 2016, it was confirmed that Knopper would join Ajax ahead of the upcoming season, where he would alternate between coaching the U16 and U15 teams. In April 2017, he signed a one-year contract extension with Ajax. Ahead of the 2018–19 season, he was promoted to U-17 manager. He left Ajax in the summer 2020.

=== Return to ADO Den Haag ===
On 13 May 2020, ADO Den Haag confirmed that Knopper would return to the club from 1 July 2020 on a two-year deal as a first team assistant coach under head coach Aleksandar Ranković. After Ranković was fired on 8 November 2020, Knopper also left the club.

On 12 October 2021, Knopper returned to ADO, however, this time as a forward coach for the women's team, ADO Den Haag Vrouwen.
