= Dean Gorré =

Surinamese footballer and manager

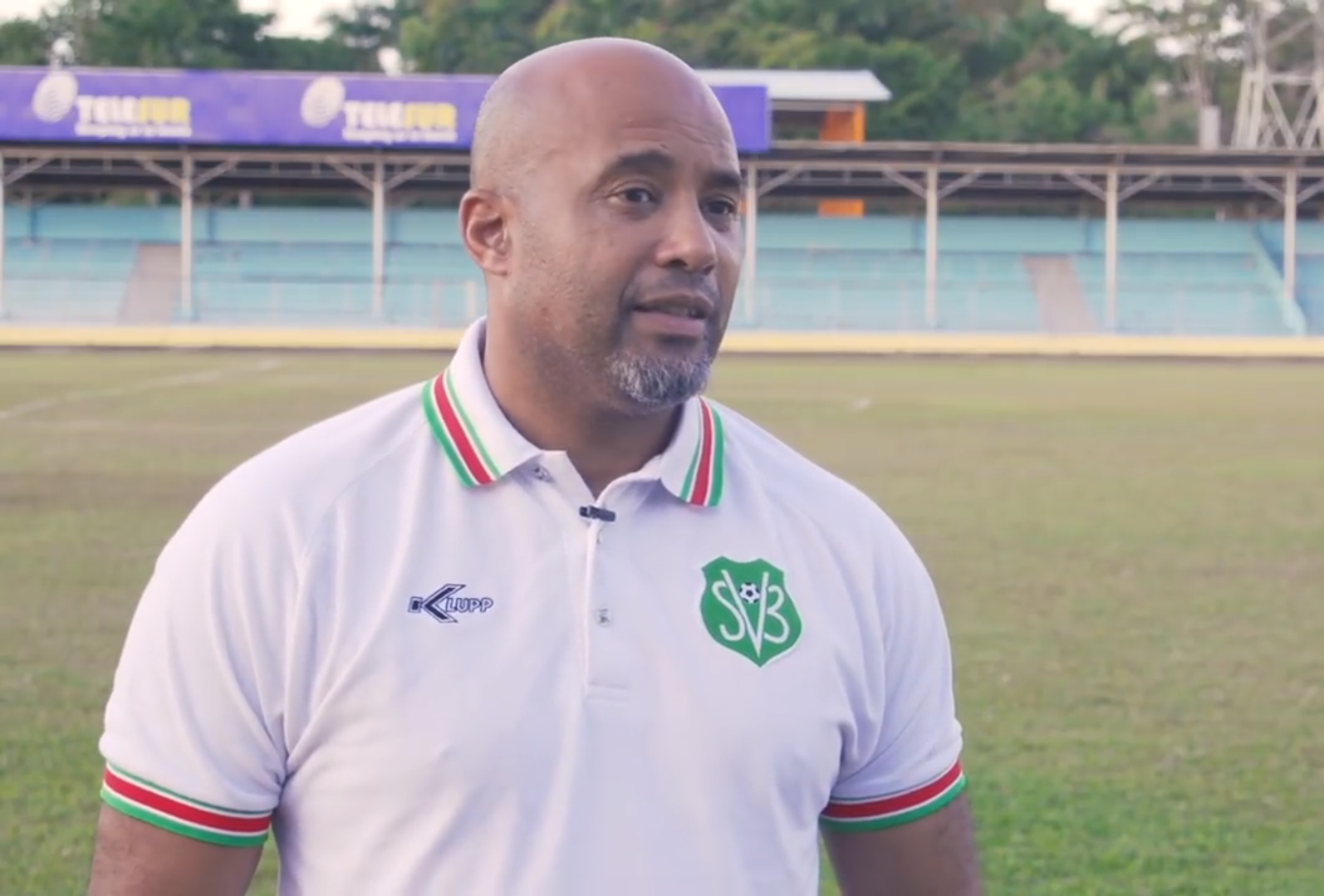
- Gorré in 2018

Personal information
- Full name: Dean Roberto Gorré
- Date of birth: 10 September 1970 (age 56)
- Place of birth: Paramaribo, Suriname
- Height: 1.73 m (5 ft 8 in)
- Position: Midfielder

Team information
- Current team: Curaçao U-20 (head coach)

Youth career
- SV Hoogvliet

Senior career*
Years	Team	Apps	(Gls)
1987–1991	SVV	82	(6)
1991–1992	SVV/Dordrecht'90	32	(8)
1992–1995	Feyenoord	42	(6)
1995–1997	Groningen	80	(18)
1997–1999	Ajax	36	(4)
1999–2001	Huddersfield Town	62	(6)
2001–2004	Barnsley	65	(9)
2004	Blackpool	1	(0)
2017–2018	Egerton	13	(0)
Total		410	(57)

International career
1989–1991	Netherlands U21	5	(1)
1992	Netherlands U23	2	(0)

Managerial career
- 2011: RBC
- 2015: Suriname
- 2017–2018: Egerton
- 2018–2021: Suriname
- 2023: Curaçao (interim)
- 2023: Curaçao women (interim)
- 2024–: Curaçao U-20
- 2025: Curaçao U-17
- * Club domestic league appearances and goals

Dean Roberto Gorré (born 10 September 1970) is a Surinamese football coach and former player. He is currently the head coach of the Curaçao national under-20 team.

== Playing career ==
=== Club ===
Born in Suriname, Gorré grew up in Hoogvliet and made his debut on 20 April 1988 for SVV. He also went on to play for the merger club SVV/Dordrecht’90, as well as at Feyenoord, Groningen, Ajax, all in the Netherlands, and Huddersfield Town, Barnsley and Blackpool in the United Kingdom.

=== International ===
Gorré played 5 games for the Netherlands national under-21 football team and 2 for the Olympic team.

== Coaching and managerial career ==
In 2008–09, he was the assistant first-team coach at Southampton, after previously occupying the same role at Stoke City.

In January 2012, he was appointed head coach at RBC Roosendaal in the Netherlands. Despite a string of negative results during his tenure at the club, the club avoided direct relegation by the end of the season; this was however made redundant later in June after the club was declared bankrupt due to financial troubles.

Gorré had a spell as a youth coach at Ajax, before being appointed Scotland national under-17 football team coach in February 2012. He had worked previously with Scottish FA performance director Mark Wotte at Southampton. He left this post for personal reasons in March 2013.

In December 2014, Gorré was appointed head coach of the new proposed professional national squad of his native country Suriname. In February 2015, the appointment was made permanent. He has coached three official Surinamese games with one win and two losses. In February 2016, the SVB said that Dean was no longer manager of Suriname, but there were papers saying that Gorre still wanted to be coach of Suriname.

In October 2016, Gorré joined Reading as a scout.

In July 2018, Gorré returned as national coach of Suriname. He signed a contract for two years. His goal to enforce Surinamese qualification for the Gold Cup, the championship of North and Central America and the Caribbean, for the first time was achieved. This was made possible via the Concacaf Nations League, which started in September 2018 and by beating Nicaragua 2–1 in the final away group match.

Gorré has been distinguished by the Surinamese President Desi Bouterse, he was appointed officer in the Honorary Order of the Yellow Star, one of the awards that can also be granted to non-Surinamese. This was for reaching the Gold Cup with the Surinamese squad for the first time ever and happened in the context of the 44th Independence Day that Suriname celebrates on 25 November each year.

== Personal life ==
Gorré has been married to his wife Magali, who is originally from The Hague in the Netherlands, for twenty-one years. Together, they have three sons: Kenji, Quinten and Aidan. All of his three sons play football. Kenji currently plays for Maccabi Haifa and Aidan is currently in the Manchester City Academy. In November 2015, Gorré and Magali renewed their wedding vows.

His wife, Magali, appeared in The Real Housewives of Cheshire until she announced her departure from the show on 1 March 2016, although a return in future has not been ruled out.

== Playing statistics ==
Appearances and goals by club, season and competition
Club	Season	League		
Club	Season	Division	Apps	Goals
SVV	1987–88	Eerste Divisie	4	0
SVV	1988–89	Eerste Divisie	36	4
SVV	1989–90	Eerste Divisie	26	1
SVV	1990–91	PTT-Telecompetitie	16	1
SVV	Total		82	6
SVV/Dordrecht '90	1991–92	PTT-Telecompetitie	32	8
SVV/Dordrecht '90	Total		32	8
Feyenoord	1992–93	PTT-Telecompetitie	25	2
Feyenoord	1993–94	PTT-Telecompetitie	12	3
Feyenoord	1994–95	PTT-Telecompetitie	5	1
Feyenoord	Total		42	6
Groningen	1994–95	PTT-Telecompetitie	12	3
Groningen	1995–96	PTT-Telecompetitie	34	4
Groningen	1996–97	PTT-Telecompetitie	34	11
Groningen	Total		80	18
Ajax	1997–98	PTT-Telecompetitie	22	3
Ajax	1998–99	PTT-Telecompetitie	14	1
Ajax	1999–00	KPN-Telecompetitie	0	0
Ajax	Total		36	4
Huddersfield Town	1999–00	Division One	28	4
Huddersfield Town	2000–01	Division One	34	2
Huddersfield Town	Total		62	6
Barnsley	2001–02	Division One	19	2
Barnsley	2002–03	Division Two	27	0
Barnsley	2003–04	Division Two	19	7
Barnsley	Total		65	9
Blackpool	2004–05	League One	1	0
Blackpool	Total		1	0
Career total			400	57

== Managerial statistics ==
As of Match played 20 July 2021

Team	From	To	Record				
Team	From	To	G	W	D	L	Win %
Suriname	2018	2021	19	12	2	5	63.16
