= 1997–98 KNVB Cup =

Tournament details
- Country: Netherlands
- Teams: 60

Final positions
- Champions: Ajax
- Runners-up: PSV
- Third place: Heerenveen
- Fourth place: Twente

Tournament statistics
- Top goal scorer(s): Anthony Lurling (7 goals)

The 1997-98 KNVB Cup (at the time called Amstel Cup) was the 80th edition of the Dutch national football annual knockout tournament for the KNVB Cup. 60 teams contested, beginning on 12 August 1997. The final was played on 17 May 1998.

Ajax beat PSV 5–0 and won the cup for the thirteenth time.

== Teams ==
- All 18 participants of the 1997–98 Eredivisie, six of which entering in the knock-out stage
- All 18 participants of the 1997–98 Eerste Divisie
- 21 teams from lower (amateur) leagues
- Three youth teams

== Group stage ==
The matches of the group stage were played between 12 August and 7 September 1997. 54 clubs participated, 26 advanced to the next round.

Group 1
Team	Pts
1. sc Heerenveen _{E}	9
2. Cambuur Leeuw. _{1}	6
3. Drachtster Boys _{A}	1
4. VVOG _{A}	1

Group 2
Team	Pts
1. SC Heracles _{1}	7
2. De Graafschap _{E}	6
3. RKSV Babberich _{A}	4
4. HSC '21 _{A}	0

Group 3
Team	Pts
1. NAC Breda _{E}	9
2. TOP Oss _{1}	6
3. SV Capelle _{A}	3
4. SC Feyenoord _{A}	0

Group 4
Team	Pts
1. FC Groningen _{E}	7
2. Veendam _{1}	7
3. Quick '20 _{A}	1
4. SC Genemuiden _{A}	1

Group 5
Team	Pts
1. Fortuna Sittard _{E}	9
2. Young PSV	6
3. BVV/Caterpillar _{A}	3
4. VVV-Venlo _{1}	0

Group 6
Team	Pts
1. ADO Den Haag _{1}	9
2. Sparta _{E}	6
3. Excelsior _{1}	3
4. SVV Scheveningen _{A}	0

Group 7
Team	Pts
1. VV Katwijk _{A}	9
2. Dordrecht'90 _{1}	7
3. FC Utrecht _{E}	6
4. VV Noordwijk _{A}	6
5. Young HFC Haarlem	1

Group 8
Team	Pts
1. Telstar _{1}	6
2. FC Volendam _{E}	6
3. Go Ahead Eagles _{1}	3
4. FC Lisse _{A}	3

Group 9
Team	Pts
1. Willem II _{E}	6
2. FC Eindhoven _{1}	6
3. SHO _{A}	4
4. RBC Roosendaal _{1}	1

Group 10
Team	Pts
1. RKC Waalwijk _{E}	9
2. FC Den Bosch _{1}	6
3. WSC _{A}	3
4. Young FC Utrecht	0

Group 11
Team	Pts
1. FC Emmen _{1}	9
2. NEC _{E}	6
3. De Treffers _{A}	3
4. GVVV _{A}	0

Group 12
Team	Pts
1. Helmond Sport _{1}	7
2. MVV _{E}	7
3. EHC _{A}	3
4. VV Baronie _{A}	0

Group 13
Team	Pts
1. AZ _{1}	9
2. AFC '34 _{A}	5
3. FC Zwolle _{1}	5
4. HFC Haarlem _{1}	4
5. HVV Hollandia _{A}	4

_{E} Eredivisie; _{1} Eerste Divisie; _{A} Amateur teams

== Knock-out stage ==
=== First round ===
The matches of the first round were played on November 18 and 19, 1997. The six highest Eredivisie teams from last season entered the tournament this round.

Home team	Result	Away team
Ajax _{E}	6–0	MVV
PSV _{E}	4–0	FC Emmen
FC Den Bosch	2–1 (aet)	AZ
NEC	2–1	ADO Den Haag
Dordrecht'90	1–4	FC Groningen
Sparta	1–2 (aet)	FC Twente _{E}
AFC '34	1–2	Fortuna Sittard
RKC Waalwijk	0–1	Vitesse Arnhem _{E}

Home team	Result	Away team
De Graafschap	2–3	Willem II (on November 8)
Helmond Sport	2–2 (p: 5-4)	Cambuur Leeuwarden (Nov. 12)
NAC Breda	5–1	VV Katwijk (on November 12)
Feyenoord _{E}	2–0	TOP Oss (on November 12)
Young PSV	3–4	Telstar
Roda JC _{E}	1–0	Veendam
FC Volendam	2–2 (p: 4-5)	SC Heracles
sc Heerenveen	6–1	FC Eindhoven

_{E} six Eredivisie entrants

=== Round of 16 ===
The matches of the round of 16 were played on February 4, 10 and 11, 1998.

Home team	Result	Away team
NAC Breda	5–0	Helmond Sport
SC Heracles	1–3	Vitesse Arnhem
FC Twente	1–0	Willem II
Telstar	0–1	Fortuna Sittard
Ajax	5–0	Roda JC
Feyenoord	2–0	FC Groningen
NEC	1–3	sc Heerenveen
FC Den Bosch	1–2 (aet)	PSV (on March 4)

=== Quarter finals ===
The quarter finals were played on March 11 and 12, 1998.

Home team	Result	Away team
FC Twente	3–1	Vitesse Arnhem
Ajax	2–1	NAC Breda
PSV	4–0	Feyenoord
sc Heerenveen	3–0	Fortuna Sittard (on March 31)

=== Semi-finals ===
The semi-finals were played on April 29 and May 7, 1998.

Home team	Result	Away team
PSV	2–1	FC Twente
Ajax	3–0	sc Heerenveen

=== Third place match ===
Since finalists Ajax and PSV already qualified for the Champions League, this match for the third place was played on May 14 to determine the Dutch participant for the last edition of the Cup Winners' Cup.

Home team	Result	Away team
sc Heerenveen	3–1	FC Twente

=== Final ===
17 May 1998
18:00

Ajax	5–0	PSV
Babangida 24'; Litmanen 38', 60', 82'; Arveladze 77'

De Kuip, Rotterdam
Attendance: 22,500
Referee: Dick Jol

Ajax also won the Dutch Eredivisie championship, thereby taking the double. They would participate in the Champions League. PSV ended second in the Eredivisie, and qualified for the Champions League as well.
