= 2002–03 AFC Ajax season =

Dutch football club season

AFC Ajax
2002–03 season
- Chairman: Michael van Praag
- Manager: Ronald Koeman
- Stadium: Amsterdam Arena
- Eredivisie: 2nd
- KNVB Cup: Semi-finals
- Champions League: Quarter-finals
- Johan Cruyff Shield: Winners
- Top goalscorer: Rafael van der Vaart (18)
Home colours	Away colours	Third colours

During the 2002–03 Dutch Football season, AFC Ajax competed in the Eredivisie.

== Season summary ==
Despite being the top scorers in the Eredivisie, Ajax were unable to defend their title and finished second. They also failed to retain the cup, but compensated by reaching the Champions League quarter-finals before being knocked out by eventual winners A.C. Milan.

== First-team squad ==
Squad at end of season

Note: Flags indicate national team as defined under FIFA eligibility rules; some limited exceptions apply. Players may hold more than one non-FIFA nationality.

No.	Pos.	Nation	Player
1	GK	ROU	Bogdan Lobonț
2	DF	TUN	Hatem Trabelsi
3	DF	NOR	André Bergdølmo
4	DF	CZE	Tomáš Galásek
5	DF	ROU	Cristian Chivu
7	MF	NED	Andy van der Meyde
8	MF	NED	Richard Witschge
9	FW	SWE	Zlatan Ibrahimović
10	MF	RSA	Steven Pienaar
12	DF	NED	John Heitinga
13	DF	BRA	Maxwell
15	MF	NED	Wesley Sneijder
16	DF	FIN	Petri Pasanen
17	FW	BRA	Wamberto

No.	Pos.	Nation	Player
18	DF	USA	John O'Brien
20	MF	FIN	Jari Litmanen
21	GK	AUS	Joey Didulica
22	MF	GHA	Abubakari Yakubu
23	MF	NED	Rafael van der Vaart
24	DF	BEL	Jelle van Damme
25	MF	CPV	David Mendes da Silva (on loan from Sparta Rotterdam)
26	MF	NED	Nigel de Jong
27	FW	NED	Victor Sikora
28	MF	MAR	Nourdin Boukhari
29	MF	NED	Jamal Akachar
30	MF	NED	Stefano Seedorf
31	GK	NED	Maarten Stekelenburg
32	GK	NED	Henk Timmer (on loan from AZ)

=== Left club during season ===
Note: Flags indicate national team as defined under FIFA eligibility rules; some limited exceptions apply. Players may hold more than one non-FIFA nationality.

No.	Pos.	Nation	Player
6	MF	NED	Aron Winter (retired)
11	FW	EGY	Mido (on loan to Celta Vigo)
14	MF	NED	Jan van Halst (to Vitesse)
15	DF	NED	Tim de Cler (to AZ)

No.	Pos.	Nation	Player
19	FW	GRE	Nikos Machlas (on loan to Sevilla)
20	FW	NED	Cedric van der Gun (on loan to Willem II)
25	MF	COL	Daniel Cruz (on loan to Germinal Beerschot)

== Reserve squad ==
Note: Flags indicate national team as defined under FIFA eligibility rules; some limited exceptions apply. Players may hold more than one non-FIFA nationality.

No. / Pos. / Nation / Player; — / DF / NED / Mitchell Piqué	No. / Pos. / Nation / Player

== Transfers ==
=== Out ===
- Richard Knopper
- Fred Grim
- Ferdi Vierklau

== Results ==
=== UEFA Champions League ===
==== First group stage ====
Pos	Team	Pld	W	D	L	GF	GA	GD	Pts	Qualification	INT	AJX	LYO	ROS
1	(Italy) Internazionale	6	3	2	1	12	8	+4	11	Advance to second group stage	—	1–0	1–2	3–0
2	(Netherlands) Ajax	6	2	2	2	6	5	+1	8	Advance to second group stage	1–2	—	2–1	1–1
3	(France) Lyon	6	2	2	2	12	9	+3	8	Transfer to UEFA Cup	3–3	0–2	—	5–0
4	(Norway) Rosenborg	6	0	4	2	4	12	−8	4		2–2	0–0	1–1	—

Source: RSSSF

==== Second group stage ====
Pos	Team	Pld	W	D	L	GF	GA	GD	Pts	Qualification	VAL	AJX	ARS	ROM
1	(Spain) Valencia	6	2	3	1	5	6	−1	9	Advance to knockout stage	—	1–1	2–1	0–3
2	(Netherlands) Ajax	6	1	5	0	6	5	+1	8	Advance to knockout stage	1–1	—	0–0	2–1
3	(England) Arsenal	6	1	4	1	6	5	+1	7		0–0	1–1	—	1–1
4	(Italy) Roma	6	1	2	3	7	8	−1	5		0–1	1–1	1–3	—

Source: RSSSF

27 November 2002	Valencia (Spain)	1–1	(Netherlands) Ajax	Valencia, Spain
20:45	Angulo 90'	Report	Ibrahimović 89'	Stadium: Estadio Mestalla; Attendance: 48,000; Referee: Gilles Veissière (France)

10 December 2002	Ajax (Netherlands)	2–1	(Italy) Roma	Amsterdam, Netherlands
20:45	Ibrahimović 11'; Litmanen 66'	Report	Batistuta 89'	Stadium: Amsterdam Arena; Attendance: 50,148; Referee: Markus Merk (Germany)

18 February 2003	Arsenal (England)	1–1	(Netherlands) Ajax	London, England
20:45	Wiltord 5'	Report	De Jong 17'	Stadium: Highbury; Attendance: 35,427; Referee: Lucílio Batista (Portugal)

26 February 2003	Ajax (Netherlands)	0–0	(England) Arsenal	Amsterdam, Netherlands
20:45		Report		Stadium: Amsterdam Arena; Attendance: 51,500; Referee: Valentin Ivanov (Russia)

11 March 2003	Ajax (Netherlands)	1–1	(Spain) Valencia	Amsterdam, Netherlands
20:45	Pasanen 56'	Report	González 28' (pen.)	Stadium: Amsterdam Arena; Referee: Ľuboš Micheľ (Slovakia)

19 March 2003	Roma (Italy)	1–1	(Netherlands) Ajax	Rome, Italy
20:45	Cassano 23'	Report	Van der Meyde 1'	Stadium: Stadio Olimpico; Attendance: 62,000; Referee: Herbert Fandel (Germany)
