= 2001–02 AFC Ajax season =

Dutch football club season

Ajax
2001–02 season
- Manager: Co Adriaanse (until 29 November); Ronald Koeman
- Stadium: Amsterdam Arena
- Eredivisie: 1st
- KNVB Cup: Winners
- Champions League: Third qualifying round
- UEFA Cup: Second round
- Top goalscorer: Rafael van der Vaart (14)
Home colours	Away colours	Third colours

During the 2001–02 Dutch football season, Ajax competed in the Eredivisie.

== Season summary ==
Manager Co Adriaanse was sacked in late November after some poor results, including elimination from the Champions League and UEFA Cup. His replacement, Ronald Koeman, led Ajax to the league and cup double.

== Players ==
=== First-team squad ===
Squad at end of season

Note: Flags indicate national team as defined under FIFA eligibility rules; some limited exceptions apply. Players may hold more than one non-FIFA nationality.

No.	Pos.	Nation	Player
1	GK	NED	Fred Grim
2	DF	NED	Ferdi Vierklau
3	DF	NOR	André Bergdølmo
4	MF	CZE	Tomáš Galásek
5	DF	ROU	Cristian Chivu
6	DF	TUN	Hatem Trabelsi
7	MF	NED	Andy van der Meyde
8	MF	NED	Jan van Halst
9	FW	SWE	Zlatan Ibrahimović
10	FW	NED	Richard Knopper
11	FW	EGY	Mido
12	GK	AUS	Joey Didulica (Note: Didulica was born in Geelong, Victoria, Australia, and represented Australia at U-23 level, but also qualified to represent Croatia internationally through his parents and made his international debut for Croatia in 2004.)
13	DF	BRA	Maxwell

No.	Pos.	Nation	Player
15	DF	NED	Tim de Cler
16	DF	FIN	Petri Pasanen
17	FW	BRA	Wamberto
18	DF	USA	John O'Brien
19	FW	GRE	Nikos Machlas
20	FW	NED	Cedric van der Gun
21	DF	NED	John Heitinga
22	MF	GHA	Abubakari Yakubu
23	MF	NED	Rafael van der Vaart
25	FW	NGA	Pius Ikedia
26	MF	COL	Daniel Cruz
27	MF	RSA	Steven Pienaar
31	GK	NED	Maarten Stekelenburg

=== Left club during season ===
Note: Flags indicate national team as defined under FIFA eligibility rules; some limited exceptions apply. Players may hold more than one non-FIFA nationality.

No.	Pos.	Nation	Player
12	GK	ROU	Bogdan Lobonț (on loan to Dinamo București)
8	MF	NED	Richard Witschge (on loan to Alavés)

No.	Pos.	Nation	Player
14	FW	GEO	Shota Arveladze (to Rangers)

=== Jong Ajax ===
Note: Flags indicate national team as defined under FIFA eligibility rules; some limited exceptions apply. Players may hold more than one non-FIFA nationality.

No. / Pos. / Nation / Player; 24 / DF / NED / Mitchell Piqué	No. / Pos. / Nation / Player; 30 / MF / NED / Stefano Seedorf

== Results ==
=== UEFA Champions League ===
==== Third qualifying round ====
- 15 August: Ajax 1-3 Celtic (Arveladze; Petta, Agathe, Sutton)
- 29 August: Celtic 0-1 Ajax

=== UEFA Cup ===
==== First round ====
- Ajax 3–0 Apollon Limassol
- Apollon Limassol 0-2 Ajax

==== Second round ====
- Copenhagen 0–0 Ajax
- Ajax 0-1 Copenhagen
