= 2000–01 AFC Ajax season =

Dutch football club season

AFC Ajax
2000–01 season
- Manager: Co Adriaanse
- Stadium: Amsterdam Arena
- Eredivise: 3rd
- KNVB Cup: Round of 16
- UEFA Cup: Second round
- Top goalscorer: Shota Arveladze (18)
Home colours	Away colours

During the 2000–01 Dutch football season, Ajax competed in the Eredivisie.

== Season summary ==
Although Ajax recorded the same points total as the previous season, this year their tally was enough for third place, which allowed them to qualify for the third qualifying round of the Champions League.

== First-team squad ==
Squad at end of season

Note: Flags indicate national team as defined under FIFA eligibility rules; some limited exceptions apply. Players may hold more than one non-FIFA nationality.

No.	Pos.	Nation	Player
1	GK	NED	Fred Grim
2	DF	NED	Ferdi Vierklau
3	DF	NOR	André Bergdølmo
4	MF	CZE	Tomáš Galásek
5	DF	ROU	Cristian Chivu
6	MF	NED	Aron Winter (captain)
7	MF	NED	Andy van der Meyde
8	MF	NED	Richard Witschge
9	FW	GEO	Shota Arveladze
10	MF	NED	Richard Knopper
11	MF	DEN	Jesper Grønkjær
12	GK	ROU	Bogdan Lobonț
14	FW	ANT	Brutil Hosé (on loan to De Graafschap)
15	DF	NED	Tim de Cler
17	MF	BRA	Wamberto

No.	Pos.	Nation	Player
18	MF	USA	John O'Brien
19	FW	GRE	Nikos Machlas
20	MF	NED	Cedric van der Gun
21	MF	NED	Kevin Bobson
22	FW	GHA	Abubakari Yakubu
23	MF	NED	Rafael van der Vaart
24	DF	DEN	Ole Tobiasen
29	MF	GHA	Kwame Quansah
31	GK	AUS	Joey Didulica
32	DF	FIN	Petri Pasanen
35	MF	RSA	Aaron Mokoena
36	DF	NGA	Christopher Kanu
37	MF	NGA	Pius Ikedia
38	MF	COL	Daniel Cruz
39	MF	NED	Youssouf Hersi

=== Left club during season ===
Note: Flags indicate national team as defined under FIFA eligibility rules; some limited exceptions apply. Players may hold more than one non-FIFA nationality.

No.	Pos.	Nation	Player
16	MF	NED	John Nieuwenburg (on loan to Sparta Rotterdam)
30	DF	NED	Mitchell Piqué (on loan to Twente)
4	MF	NED	Jan van Halst (on loan to Fortuna Sittard)

No.	Pos.	Nation	Player
26	MF	NED	Peter Hoekstra (on loan to Groningen)
19	MF	NGA	Tijani Babangida (on loan to Gençlerbirliği)

== Jong Ajax ==
Note: Flags indicate national team as defined under FIFA eligibility rules; some limited exceptions apply. Players may hold more than one non-FIFA nationality.

No.	Pos.	Nation	Player
16	GK	NED	Maarten Stekelenburg
27	DF	NED	Serginho Greene
13	DF	NED	John Heitinga
28	MF	NED	Nigel de Jong

No.	Pos.	Nation	Player
30	MF	NED	Stefano Seedorf
26	MF	NED	Jeffrey Sneijder
33	MF	NED	Wesley Sneijder
25	MF	COL	Daniel Cruz

== Transfers ==
=== Out ===
- Frank Verlaat - Werder Bremen
- Brian Laudrup - retired
- Dani - Benfica
- Serge van den Ban - HFC Haarlem

== Results ==
=== UEFA Cup ===
==== First round ====
12 September 2000	Gent (Belgium)	0–6	(Netherlands) Ajax	Jules Ottenstadion, Ghent
		Report	Arveladze 16'; Knopper 40', 69'; Grønkjær 70' van der Vaart 80' van der Gun 84'	Referee: Juan Ansuátegui Roca (Spain)

28 September 2000	Ajax (Netherlands)	3–0	(Belgium) Gent	Amsterdam ArenA, Amsterdam
	Van der Gun 27', 58'; Van der Vaart 85'	Report		Referee: Lutz Michael Fröhlich (Germany)

Ajax won 9–0 on aggregate.

==== Second round ====
26 October 2000	Lausanne (Switzerland)	1–0	(Netherlands) Ajax	Stade Olympique de la Pontaise, Lausanne
	Mazzoni 37'	Report UEFA Report	Wamberto (red card) 79'	Attendance: 11,150; Referee: Željko Širić (Croatia)

9 November 2000	Ajax (Netherlands)	2–2	(Switzerland) Lausanne	Amsterdam Arena, Amsterdam
	Arveladze 17'; Van der Gun 79'	Report UEFA Report	Mazzoni 38'; Kuźba 77' (pen.)	Attendance: 27,500; Referee: Víctor José Esquinas Torres (Spain)

Lausanne win 3–2 on aggregate
