= 2003–04 AFC Ajax season =

Dutch football club season

Ajax
2003–04 season
- Manager: Ronald Koeman
- Eredivise: 1st
- KNVB Cup: Round of 16
- UEFA Champions League: Group stage
- Top goalscorer: Zlatan Ibrahimović (13)
Home colours	Away colours	Third colours

During the 2003–04 Dutch football season, AFC Ajax competed in the Eredivisie.

== Season summary ==
Ajax reclaimed the Eredivisie title.

== Players ==
=== First-team squad ===
Squad at end of season

Note: Flags indicate national team as defined under FIFA eligibility rules; some limited exceptions apply. Players may hold more than one non-FIFA nationality.

No.	Pos.	Nation	Player
1	GK	ROU	Bogdan Lobonț
2	DF	TUN	Hatem Trabelsi
4	DF	FRA	Julien Escudé
5	MF	USA	John O'Brien
6	DF	CZE	Tomáš Galásek
7	MF	BEL	Tom Soetaers
8	MF	RSA	Steven Pienaar
9	FW	SWE	Zlatan Ibrahimović
10	MF	NED	Rafael van der Vaart (captain)
11	MF	NED	Victor Sikora
12	DF	NED	John Heitinga
14	DF	BEL	Jelle Van Damme
15	DF	BRA	Maxwell
16	MF	NED	Nigel de Jong
17	FW	GRE	Yannis Anastasiou

No.	Pos.	Nation	Player
18	MF	NED	Wesley Sneijder
19	FW	BEL	Wesley Sonck
20	MF	FIN	Jari Litmanen
21	GK	NED	Maarten Stekelenburg
22	MF	GHA	Abubakari Yakubu
23	DF	CZE	Zdeněk Grygera
26	MF	GHA	Anthony Obodai
27	MF	NED	Daniël de Ridder
29	MF	ROU	Nicolae Mitea
30	MF	AUS	Jason Culina
31	GK	NED	Sander Boschker
33	DF	BEL	Thomas Vermaelen
37	MF	BEL	Tom De Mul
39	FW	NED	Ryan Babel

=== Left club during season ===
Note: Flags indicate national team as defined under FIFA eligibility rules; some limited exceptions apply. Players may hold more than one non-FIFA nationality.

No.	Pos.	Nation	Player
3	DF	FIN	Petri Pasanen (on loan to Portsmouth)
17	FW	BRA	Wamberto (on loan to Mons)

No.	Pos.	Nation	Player
27	MF	NED	Cedric van der Gun (on loan to ADO Den Haag)
28	MF	MAR	Nourdin Boukhari (Note: Boukhari was born in Rotterdam, the Netherlands, but also qualified to represent Morocco internationally and made his international debut for Morocco in November 2001.) (on loan to NAC Breda)

=== Reserve squad ===
Note: Flags indicate national team as defined under FIFA eligibility rules; some limited exceptions apply. Players may hold more than one non-FIFA nationality.

No.	Pos.	Nation	Player
—	MF	NED	Jamal Akachar

== Transfers ==
=== In ===
- (Czech Republic) Zdeněk Grygera - (Czech Republic) Sparta Prague, 22 July, €3,500,000
- (Belgium) Wesley Sonck - (Belgium) Genk
- (Netherlands) Sander Boschker - (Netherlands) Twente
- (France) Julien Escudé - (France) Rennes
- (Romania) Nicolae Mitea - (Romania) Dinamo București
- (Belgium) Tom Soetaers - (Netherlands) Roda JC
- (Greece) Yannis Anastasiou - (Netherlands) Roda JC

=== Out ===
- (Egypt) Mido - (France) Marseille, 12 July, €12,000,000
- (Greece) Nikos Machlas - contract terminated, July
- (Romania) Cristian Chivu - (Italy) Roma, September, €18,000,000
- (Netherlands) Andy van der Meyde - (Italy) Inter Milan, £4,000,000
- (Netherlands) Mitchell Piqué - (Netherlands) FC Oss
- (Netherlands) Richard Witschge - (Netherlands) ADO' 20
- (Australia) Joey Didulica (Note: Didulica was born in Geelong, Victoria, Australia, and represented Australia at U-23 level, but also qualified to represent Croatia internationally through his father and made his international debut for Croatia in March 2004.) - Austria Wien
- (Norway) André Bergdølmo - (Germany) Borussia Dortmund

=== Loan out ===
- (Netherlands) Cedric van der Gun - (Netherlands) ADO Den Haag, 4 September, end of season
- (Morocco) Nourdin Boukhari - (Netherlands) NAC Breda, 4 September, end of season
- (Netherlands) Stefano Seedorf - (Netherlands) NAC Breda, end of season
- (Finland) Petri Pasanen - (England) Portsmouth, end of season
- (Brazil) Wamberto - (Belgium) Mons, 18 months

== Results ==
=== UEFA Champions League ===
==== Third qualifying round ====
12 August 2003	GAK (Austria)	1–1	(Netherlands) Ajax	Stadion Graz-Liebenau, Graz
20:30	Pogatetz 56'	Report MatchCentre	Sneijder 76'	Referee: Massimo De Santis (Italy)

27 August 2003	Ajax (Netherlands)	2–1 (a.e.t.)	(Austria) GAK	Amsterdam Arena, Amsterdam
20:30	Ibrahimović 15'; Galásek 103' (pen.)	Report MatchCentre	Kollmann 40'	Referee: Valentin Ivanov (Russia)

==== Group stage ====
Pos	Team	Pld	W	D	L	GF	GA	GD	Pts	Qualification	MIL	CLT	BRU	AJX
1	(Italy) Milan	6	3	1	2	4	3	+1	10	Advance to knockout stage	—	1–2	0–1	1–0
2	(Spain) Celta Vigo	6	2	3	1	7	6	+1	9	Advance to knockout stage	0–0	—	1–1	3–2
3	(Belgium) Club Brugge	6	2	2	2	5	6	−1	8	Transfer to UEFA Cup	0–1	1–1	—	2–1
4	(Netherlands) Ajax	6	2	0	4	6	7	−1	6		0–1	1–0	2–0	—

Source: RSSSF

16 September 2003	Milan (Italy)	1–0	(Netherlands) Ajax	San Siro, Milan
20:45	Inzaghi 67'	Report MatchCentre		Referee: Ľuboš Micheľ (Slovakia)

1 October 2003	Ajax (Netherlands)	2–0	(Belgium) Club Brugge	Amsterdam Arena, Amsterdam
20:45	Sonck 11', 54'	Report MatchCentre		Referee: Graham Barber (England)

22 October 2003	Ajax (Netherlands)	1–0	(Spain) Celta Vigo	Amsterdam Arena, Amsterdam
20:45	Ibrahimović 53'	Report MatchCentre		Referee: Markus Merk (Germany)

4 November 2003	Celta Vigo (Spain)	3–2	(Netherlands) Ajax	Balaídos, Vigo
20:45	Luccin 25' (pen.); Milošević 39'; Vágner 63'	Report MatchCentre	Sonck 53'; Van der Vaart 82'	Referee: Gilles Veissière (France)

26 November 2003	Ajax (Netherlands)	0–1	(Italy) Milan	Amsterdam Arena, Amsterdam
20:45		Report MatchCentre	Shevchenko 52'	Referee: Urs Meier (Switzerland)

9 December 2003	Club Brugge (Belgium)	2–1	(Netherlands) Ajax	Jan Breydel Stadium, Bruges
20:45	Lange 27'; Sæternes 84'	Report MatchCentre	Sonck 42' (pen.)	Referee: Domenico Messina (Italy)
