= List of AFC Ajax seasons =

A list of football seasons contested by AFC Ajax in both domestic and international competitions.

== Seasons ==
Season	Domestic league										KNVB Cup	Europe		Other competitions		Top scorer(s)	
Season	Division	Pos	Pld	W	D	L	GF	GA	GD	Pts	KNVB Cup	Europe		Other competitions		Player(s)	Goals
1956–57	Eredivisie	1st	34	22	5	7	64	40	+24	49	Subround					Wim Bleijenberg	20
1957–58	Eredivisie	3rd	34	17	8	9	62	44	+18	42		European Cup	QF			Loek den Edel	17
1958–59	Eredivisie	6th	34	15	7	12	77	63	+14	37	QF					Piet van der Kuil	16
1959–60	Eredivisie	1st	34	22	6	6	109	44	+65	50	Not held					Henk Groot	37
1960–61	Eredivisie	2nd	34	22	7	5	102	51	+51	51	W	Cup Winners' Cup	QR1			Henk Groot	42
1961–62	Eredivisie	5th	34	16	7	11	80	59	+21	39	L16	Cup Winners' Cup	R1			Henk Groot	18
1962–63	Eredivisie	2nd	30	17	5	8	73	41	+32	39	L16	Intertoto Cup	GS			Henk Groot	18
1963–64	Eredivisie	5th	30	13	8	9	63	40	+23	34	QF	Intertoto Cup	GS			Piet Keizer	13
1964–65	Eredivisie	13th	30	9	8	13	52	51	+1	26	L64					Klaas Nuninga	14
1965–66	Eredivisie	1st	30	24	4	2	79	25	+54	52	QF					Johan Cruyff	16
1966–67	Eredivisie	1st	34	26	4	4	122	34	+88	56	W	European Cup	QF			Johan Cruyff	33
1967–68	Eredivisie	1st	34	27	4	3	96	19	+77	58	L16	European Cup	R1			Johan Cruyff	25
1968–69	Eredivisie	2nd	34	25	4	5	90	34	+56	54	L16	European Cup	RU			Johan Cruyff	24
1969–70	Eredivisie	1st	34	27	6	1	100	23	+77	60	W	Inter-Cities Fairs Cup	SF			Johan Cruyff	23
1970–71	Eredivisie	2nd	34	24	5	5	90	20	+70	53	W	European Cup	W			Johan Cruyff	21
1971–72	Eredivisie	1st	34	30	3	1	104	20	+84	63	W	European Cup	W			Johan Cruyff	25
1972–73	Eredivisie	1st	34	30	0	4	120	18	+84	60	L32	UEFA Super Cup	W	Intercontinental Cup	W	Johnny Rep	17
1972–73	Eredivisie	1st	34	30	0	4	120	18	+84	60	L32	European Cup	W	Intercontinental Cup	W	Johnny Rep	17
1973–74	Eredivisie	3rd	34	21	9	4	88	30	+58	51	SF	UEFA Super Cup	W			Johan Neeskens	15
1973–74	Eredivisie	3rd	34	21	9	4	88	30	+58	51	SF	European Cup	R2			Johan Neeskens	15
1974–75	Eredivisie	3rd	34	21	7	6	76	34	+36	49	L16	UEFA Cup	R3			Ruud Geels	30
1975–76	Eredivisie	3rd	34	21	8	5	74	38	+36	50	QF	UEFA Cup	R3			Ruud Geels	29
1976–77	Eredivisie	1st	34	23	6	5	62	26	+36	52	L32	UEFA Cup	R1			Ruud Geels	34
1977–78	Eredivisie	2nd	34	20	9	5	85	36	+49	49	RU	European Cup	QF			Ruud Geels	30
1978–79	Eredivisie	1st	34	22	6	6	77	41	+36	50	W	UEFA Cup	R3			(Denmark) Søren Lerby	16
1979–80	Eredivisie	1st	34	22	6	6	77	41	+36	50	RU	European Cup	SF			Dick Schoenaker	13
1980–81	Eredivisie	2nd	34	22	4	8	88	54	+34	48	RU	European Cup	R2			Wim Kieft	17
1981–82	Eredivisie	1st	34	26	4	4	117	42	+75	58	L16	Cup Winners' Cup	R1			Wim Kieft	32
1982–83	Eredivisie	1st	34	26	6	2	106	41	+65	58	W	European Cup	R1			Wim Kieft	19
1983–84	Eredivisie	3rd	34	22	7	5	100	46	+54	51	L16	European Cup	R1			Marco van Basten	28
1984–85	Eredivisie	1st	34	24	6	4	93	46	+47	54	L16	UEFA Cup	R2			Marco van Basten	22
1985–86	Eredivisie	2nd	34	25	2	7	120	35	+85	52	W	European Cup	R1			Marco van Basten	37
1986–87	Eredivisie	2nd	34	25	3	6	92	30	+62	53	W	Cup Winners' Cup	W			Marco van Basten	31
1987–88	Eredivisie	2nd	34	23	4	7	78	40	+38	50	L32	Cup Winners' Cup	RU			John Bosman	25
1987–88	Eredivisie	2nd	34	23	4	7	78	40	+38	50	L32	Super Cup	RU			John Bosman	25
1988–89	Eredivisie	2nd	34	22	6	6	74	32	+42	50	QF	UEFA Cup	R1			Dennis Bergkamp (Sweden) Stefan Pettersson	13
1989–90	Eredivisie	1st	34	19	11	4	67	23	+44	49	SF	UEFA Cup	R1			Aron Winter	10
1990–91	Eredivisie	2nd	34	22	9	3	75	21	+54	53	QF	European Cup	DSQ			Dennis Bergkamp	25
1991–92	Eredivisie	2nd	34	25	5	4	83	24	+59	55	QF	UEFA Cup	W			Dennis Bergkamp	22
1992–93	Eredivisie	3rd	34	20	9	5	87	30	+57	49	W	UEFA Cup	QF			Dennis Bergkamp	26
1993–94	Eredivisie	1st	34	26	2	6	86	26	+60	54	SF	Cup Winners' Cup	QF	Dutch Supercup	W	(Finland) Jari Litmanen	26
1994–95	Eredivisie	1st	34	27	7	0	106	28	+78	61	QF	Champions League	W	Dutch Supercup	W	Patrick Kluivert	18
1995–96	Eredivisie	1st	34	26	5	3	97	24	+73	83	L16	UEFA Super Cup	W	Dutch Supercup	W	Patrick Kluivert	15
1995–96	Eredivisie	1st	34	26	5	3	97	24	+73	83	L16	Champions League	RU	Intercontinental Cup	W	Patrick Kluivert	15
1996–97	Eredivisie	4th	34	17	10	7	55	31	+24	61	L32	Champions League	SF	Johan Cruyff Shield	RU	Patrick Kluivert (Finland) Jari Litmanen	6
1997–98	Eredivisie	1st	34	29	2	3	112	22	+90	89	W	UEFA Cup	QF			(Georgia (country)) Shota Arveladze	25
1998–99	Eredivisie	6th	34	16	9	9	73	41	+32	57	W	Champions League	GS	Johan Cruyff Shield	RU	(Finland) Jari Litmanen (South Africa) Benni McCarthy	11
1999–2000	Eredivisie	5th	34	18	7	9	72	51	+21	61	L16	UEFA Cup	R3	Johan Cruyff Shield	RU	Richard Knopper (Greece) Nikos Machlas	10
2000–01	Eredivisie	3rd	34	18	7	9	85	43	+42	61	L16	UEFA Cup	R2			(Georgia (country)) Shota Arveladze	17
2001–02	Eredivisie	1st	34	22	7	5	73	34	+39	73	W	Champions League	QR3			Rafael van der Vaart	14
2001–02	Eredivisie	1st	34	22	7	5	73	34	+39	73	W	UEFA Cup	R2			Rafael van der Vaart	14
2002–03	Eredivisie	2nd	34	26	5	3	96	32	+64	83	SF	Champions League	QF	Johan Cruyff Shield	W	Rafael van der Vaart	18
2003–04	Eredivisie	1st	34	25	5	4	79	31	+48	80	L16	Champions League	GS			(Sweden) Zlatan Ibrahimović	13
2004–05	Eredivisie	2nd	34	24	5	5	74	33	+41	77	SF	Champions League	GS	Johan Cruyff Shield	RU	Ryan Babel; Wesley Sneijder	7
2004–05	Eredivisie	2nd	34	24	5	5	74	33	+41	77	SF	UEFA Cup	L32	Johan Cruyff Shield	RU	Ryan Babel; Wesley Sneijder	7
2005–06	Eredivisie	4th	34	18	6	10	66	41	+25	60	W	Champions League	L16	Johan Cruyff Shield	W	Klaas-Jan Huntelaar	16
2006–07	Eredivisie	2nd	34	23	6	5	84	35	+49	75	W	Champions League	QR3	Johan Cruyff Shield	W	Klaas-Jan Huntelaar	21
2006–07	Eredivisie	2nd	34	23	6	5	84	35	+49	75	W	UEFA Cup	L32	Johan Cruyff Shield	W	Klaas-Jan Huntelaar	21
2007–08	Eredivisie	2nd	34	20	9	5	94	45	+49	69	R4	Champions League	QR3	Johan Cruyff Shield	W	Klaas-Jan Huntelaar	33
2007–08	Eredivisie	2nd	34	20	9	5	94	45	+49	69	R4	UEFA Cup	R1	Johan Cruyff Shield	W	Klaas-Jan Huntelaar	33
2008–09	Eredivisie	3rd	34	21	5	8	74	41	+33	68	R3	UEFA Cup	L16			(Uruguay) Luis Suárez	22
2009–10	Eredivisie	2nd	34	27	4	3	106	20	+86	85	W	Europa League	L32			(Uruguay) Luis Suárez	35
2010–11	Eredivisie	1st	34	22	7	5	72	30	+42	73	RU	Champions League	GS	Johan Cruyff Shield	RU	(Morocco) Mounir El Hamdaoui	13
2010–11	Eredivisie	1st	34	22	7	5	72	30	+42	73	RU	Europa League	L16	Johan Cruyff Shield	RU	(Morocco) Mounir El Hamdaoui	13
2011–12	Eredivisie	1st	34	23	7	4	93	36	+57	76	R4	Champions League	GS	Johan Cruyff Shield	RU	Siem de Jong	13
2011–12	Eredivisie	1st	34	23	7	4	93	36	+57	76	R4	Europa League	L32	Johan Cruyff Shield	RU	Siem de Jong	13
2012–13	Eredivisie	1st	34	22	10	2	83	31	+52	76	SF	Champions League	GS	Johan Cruyff Shield	RU	Siem de Jong	12
2012–13	Eredivisie	1st	34	22	10	2	83	31	+52	76	SF	Europa League	L32	Johan Cruyff Shield	RU	Siem de Jong	12
2013–14	Eredivisie	1st	34	20	11	3	69	28	+41	71	RU	Champions League	GS	Johan Cruyff Shield	W	Davy Klaassen (Iceland) Kolbeinn Sigþórsson	10
2013–14	Eredivisie	1st	34	20	11	3	69	28	+41	71	RU	Europa League	L32	Johan Cruyff Shield	W	Davy Klaassen (Iceland) Kolbeinn Sigþórsson	10
2014–15	Eredivisie	2nd	34	21	8	5	69	29	+40	71	R4	Champions League	GS	Johan Cruyff Shield	RU	(Poland) Arkadiusz Milik	23
2014–15	Eredivisie	2nd	34	21	8	5	69	29	+40	71	R4	Europa League	L16	Johan Cruyff Shield	RU	(Poland) Arkadiusz Milik	23
2015–16	Eredivisie	2nd	34	25	7	2	81	21	+60	82	R3	Champions League	QR3			(Poland) Arkadiusz Milik	21
2015–16	Eredivisie	2nd	34	25	7	2	81	21	+60	82	R3	Europa League	GS			(Poland) Arkadiusz Milik	21
2016–17	Eredivisie	2nd	34	25	6	3	79	23	+56	81	R3	Champions League	PO			(Denmark) Kasper Dolberg	22
2016–17	Eredivisie	2nd	34	25	6	3	79	23	+56	81	R3	Europa League	RU			(Denmark) Kasper Dolberg	22
2017–18	Eredivisie	2nd	34	25	4	5	89	33	+56	79	R3	Champions League	QR3			(Brazil) David Neres	14
2017–18	Eredivisie	2nd	34	25	4	5	89	33	+56	79	R3	Europa League	PO			(Brazil) David Neres	14
2018–19	Eredivisie	1st	34	28	2	4	119	32	+87	86	W	Champions League	SF			(Serbia) Dušan Tadić	38
2019–20	Eredivisie	1st (Note: The 2019–20 Eredivisie season was ended early due to the COVID-19 pandemic. As a result, Ajax concluded the league season in first place, but were not awarded the title.)	25	18	2	5	68	23	+45	56	SF	Champions League	GS	Johan Cruyff Shield	W	Quincy Promes (Serbia) Dušan Tadić	16
2019–20	Eredivisie	1st	25	18	2	5	68	23	+45	56	SF	Europa League	L32	Johan Cruyff Shield	W	Quincy Promes (Serbia) Dušan Tadić	16
2020–21	Eredivisie	1st	34	28	4	2	102	23	+79	88	W	Champions League	GS			(Serbia) Dušan Tadić	22
2020–21	Eredivisie	1st	34	28	4	2	102	23	+79	88	W	Europa League	QF			(Serbia) Dušan Tadić	22
2021–22	Eredivisie	1st	34	26	5	3	98	19	+79	83	RU	Champions League	L16	Johan Cruyff Shield	RU	(Ivory Coast) Sébastien Haller	34
2022–23	Eredivisie	3rd	34	20	9	5	86	38	+48	69	RU	Champions League	GS	Johan Cruyff Shield	RU	(Ghana) Mohammed Kudus	18
2022–23	Eredivisie	3rd	34	20	9	5	86	38	+48	69	RU	Europa League	KRPO	Johan Cruyff Shield	RU	(Ghana) Mohammed Kudus	18
2023–24	Eredivisie	5th	34	15	11	8	74	61	+13	56	R2	Europa League	GS			Brian Brobbey	22
2023–24	Eredivisie	5th	34	15	11	8	74	61	+13	56	R2	Europa Conference League	L16			Brian Brobbey	22
2024–25	Eredivisie	2nd	34	24	6	4	67	32	+35	78	R16	Europa League	L16			Kenneth Taylor	15
2025–26	Eredivisie	5th	34								R16	Champions League	LP				
