= 2002 Johan Cruyff Shield =

Football match in the Netherlands

Johan Cruijff Schaal VII
Ajax	PSV Eindhoven
3	1
- Date: 11 August 2002
- Venue: Amsterdam Arena, Amsterdam
- Referee: Jack van Hulten
- Attendance: 40,200

The seventh edition of the Johan Cruyff Shield (Dutch: Johan Cruijff Schaal) was held on 11 August 2002 between 2001–02 Eredivisie and 2001–02 KNVB Cup winners Ajax, and Eredivisie runners-up PSV Eindhoven. Ajax won the match 3–1.

== Match ==
=== Details ===
11 August 2002
18:00 CEST

Ajax	3–1	PSV Eindhoven
Van der Vaart 41', 76'; Mido 54'		Kežman 10'

Amsterdam Arena, Amsterdam
Attendance: 40,200
Referee: Jack van Hulten

Ajax	PSV Eindhoven

GK	31	(Netherlands) Maarten Stekelenburg
RB	2	(Tunisia) Hatem Trabelsi
CB	3	(Norway) André Bergdølmo		(substituted off) 46'
CB	5	(Romania) Cristian Chivu (c)	(yellow card) 73'
LB	18	(United States) John O'Brien
CM	4	(Czech Republic) Tomáš Galásek	(yellow card) 79'
CM	23	(Netherlands) Rafael van der Vaart
CM	13	(Brazil) Maxwell
RW	7	(Netherlands) Andy van der Meyde	(yellow card) 27'
CF	11	(Egypt) Mido		(substituted off) 77'
LW	27	(Netherlands) Victor Sikora		(substituted off) 73'
Substitutes:
DF	16	(Finland) Petri Pasanen		(substituted in) 46'
FW	17	(Brazil) Wamberto		(substituted in) 73'
FW	9	(Sweden) Zlatan Ibrahimović		(substituted in) 77'
Manager:
(Netherlands) Ronald Koeman

GK	23	(Netherlands) Ronald Waterreus
RB	30	(Denmark) Kasper Bøgelund
CB	2	(Netherlands) André Ooijer	(yellow card) 67'
CB	3	(Netherlands) Kevin Hofland
LB	22	(Netherlands) Wilfred Bouma
RM	19	(Denmark) Dennis Rommedahl
CM	6	(Netherlands) Mark van Bommel (c)
CM	14	(Switzerland) Johann Vogel		(substituted off) 64'
LM	17	(Georgia (country)) Giorgi Gakhokidze		(substituted off) 64'
SS	10	(Netherlands) Arnold Bruggink		(substituted off) 79'
CF	9	(Federal Republic of Yugoslavia) Mateja Kežman	(yellow card) 59'
Substitutes:
FW	8	(Netherlands) Jan Vennegoor of Hesselink		(substituted in) 64'
FW	11	(Netherlands) Arjen Robben		(substituted in) 64'
FW	7	(Morocco) Adil Ramzi		(substituted in) 79'
Manager:
(Netherlands) Guus Hiddink
