= Rafael van der Vaart =

Dutch footballer (born 1983)

- Van der Vaart in 2000

Personal information
- Full name: Rafael Ferdinand van der Vaart
- Date of birth: 11 February 1983 (age 43)
- Place of birth: Heemskerk, North Holland, Netherlands
- Height: 1.76 m (5 ft 9 in)
- Position: Attacking midfielder

Youth career
- 1987–1993: De Kennemers
- 1993–1999: Ajax

Senior career*
Years	Team	Apps	(Gls)
1999–2005	Ajax	117	(52)
2005–2008	Hamburger SV	74	(30)
2008–2010	Real Madrid	58	(11)
2010–2012	Tottenham Hotspur	63	(24)
2012–2015	Hamburger SV	78	(16)
2015–2016	Betis	7	(0)
2016–2018	Midtjylland	17	(2)
2018	Esbjerg	3	(0)
Total		417	(135)

International career
1998–1999	Netherlands U17	13	(5)
1999–2000	Netherlands U19	8	(2)
2000–2001	Netherlands U21	4	(2)
2001–2013	Netherlands	109	(25)

Managerial career
- 2021–2023: Esbjerg (assistant)
- 2022: Esbjerg (caretaker)
Medal record
Men's football
Representing Netherlands
FIFA World Cup
Runner-up	2010 South Africa
UEFA European Championship
Bronze medal – third place	2004 Portugal
UEFA European Under-16 Championship
Bronze medal – third place	2000 Israel	U-16 Team
- * Club domestic league appearances and goals

Rafael Ferdinand van der Vaart (Dutch pronunciation: [ˈrɑfaːɛl ˈfɛrdinɑnt vɑn dər vaːrt]; born 11 February 1983) is a Dutch former professional footballer who played as an attacking midfielder.

Van der Vaart began his career at Ajax's youth academy and worked his way into the first team, debuting as a 17-year-old. Known for his playmaking skills, he drew comparisons to Johan Cruyff. He was named Dutch Football Talent of the Year and became the first recipient of the Golden Boy Award while at the club. He moved to Bundesliga club Hamburger SV, then to Real Madrid, then on to Tottenham Hotspur before returning to Hamburger SV in 2012. In the latter stages of his career, Van der Vaart had brief spells playing in Spain and Denmark before announcing his retirement in 2018, and return in 2019 with a testimonial match.

Van der Vaart earned 109 caps for the Netherlands between 2001 and 2013. He represented the country at three UEFA European Championships and two FIFA World Cups, reaching the final in 2010.

In 2019, Van der Vaart began his darts career, joining the British Darts Organisation.

== Early life ==
Van der Vaart with Ajax

Van der Vaart was born in Heemskerk, North Holland, to a Dutch father and a Spanish mother from Chiclana de la Frontera, Cádiz, who had moved to the Netherlands weeks after birth. He grew up on a caravan park, belonging to Dutch Travellers called the Woonwagenbewoners, who had ties to the Irish Travellers and the Yenish people, and he often pretended to be Romário while playing football. It was at the trailer park that he learned how to play football and, before joining Ajax, he played for a local club called De Kennemers based in Beverwijk. At the age of ten, he joined the Ajax Academy. Van der Vaart has said of his upbringing: "That was the way my family lived. My father was born there and it is a lifestyle. Maybe it is not a normal lifestyle but I always liked it. I always played football on the street. It was an easy life, then I was 10 years old and went to Ajax and played there for almost 12 years."

== Club career ==
=== Ajax ===
Van der Vaart came through the ranks at Ajax with national teammates John Heitinga and Wesley Sneijder. Initially, he signed for Ajax on a trial basis as a ten-year-old, but was eventually enrolled permanently after impressing the coaches. At the age of 17, Van der Vaart made his debut for the Ajax senior side in a 1–1 draw with Den Bosch on 19 April 2000 in the 1999–00 season. After he broke into the Ajax first team, Van der Vaart was "hailed as the new Johan Cruyff".

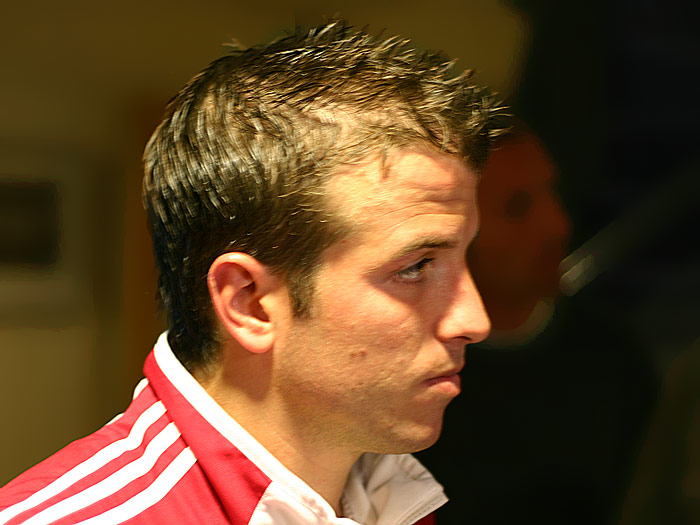
Van der Vaart was with Ajax from 1993 to 2005

In the 2000–01 season, Ajax manager Co Adriaanse increased Van der Vaart's playing time by moving him to the attacking midfielder position. He was voted European Talent of the Year by Italian football website CalcioManager.

The next season, Van der Vaart suffered a serious knee injury against RKC Waalwijk on 10 February 2002 which required an operation that involved the removal of his entire meniscus. This injury forced him to miss the run-in to Ajax's successful Eredivisie campaign and their Dutch Cup triumph against Utrecht in the 2001–02 season, but it did not stop him being named the Netherlands' Talent of the Year, mainly thanks to the 15 goals in just 27 games that he scored before the incident.

In 2002–03, Ajax won the Amsterdam Tournament, though injury limited Van der Vaart to 21 league appearances, in which he scored 18 goals. After his return to fitness, he scored a vital goal in the UEFA Champions League away to Lyon, which propelled Ajax into the knockout stages.

In the first half of 2003–04, his performances were poor. Van der Vaart admitted he was overweight, and the media criticized his celebrity lifestyle with his then-fiancée, The Music Factory VJ Sylvie Meis. He became an influential figure once again as Ajax claimed another league title. By that stage, Van der Vaart had firmly established himself as one of the stars of the Ajax team, as well as one of the most popular players in the Netherlands.

Van der Vaart was named team captain by coach Ronald Koeman for the 2004–05 season. During an international match against Sweden on 18 August 2004, he was injured by then-Ajax teammate Zlatan Ibrahimović, which led to the sale of Ibrahimović to Juventus two weeks later, following controversial accusations that the Swede had intentionally tried to hurt Van der Vaart. He was unhappy at being played out of position, and following his refusal to play on the wing in a Champions League match in December, he was stripped of the team captaincy by Koeman.

His ongoing injury problems that resulted in an average of only 23 league appearances in five seasons with Ajax, led him to announce that he was leaving the club at the end of the year.

=== Hamburger SV ===
At this point, Van der Vaart's performances were attracting interest from some of Europe's top clubs. He had previously been strongly linked to Milan, but in the summer of 2005, he signed for Bundesliga outfit Hamburger SV in Germany. Van der Vaart's €5.5 million transfer to Hamburg, on 1 June 2005, raised many eyebrows. Many other top-flight clubs had shown interest in the midfielder but he chose Hamburg. Ajax legend Johan Cruyff himself commented in his De Telegraaf column: "I don't know what to say about it or what Rafael van der Vaart is doing in Hamburg." He played a massive part in Hamburg's impressive away form that season, scoring in each of their first four games on the road; in fact, in the course of his first one and a half seasons with the German club, they did not lose a single match away from home while he was on the pitch. Van der Vaart finished his first season as the team's top scorer as Hamburg finished third in the league and won the 2005 UEFA Intertoto Cup.

He assumed the team captaincy for the 2006–07 season. This season proved to be a difficult one for his club, and despite Van der Vaart's three goals in the Champions League group stages, they made an early exit from the competition, while languishing for several months in the bottom half of the Bundesliga table as Van der Vaart was troubled by injuries throughout the season. The arrival of Van der Vaart's countryman Huub Stevens as head coach, however, saw Hamburg march up the standings and they finished the season in a respectable seventh place, qualifying for, and also winning, the Intertoto Cup.

After garnering interest from Real Madrid from Spain, Van der Vaart responded by saying, "I am set to spend another season in Hamburg," of which he told Welt am Sonntag. He further added, "Now we have the team to achieve something." In the 2007–08 season, Van der Vaart scored 12 league goals as Hamburg finished fourth in the league, while reaching the round of 16 in the UEFA Cup. During the UEFA Cup away win at FC Zürich, he tore ankle ligaments and was out of action for several weeks. Despite interest from other clubs such as Chelsea and Valencia, he stated that he would stay at Hamburg until the end of the season, but opted out of signing a contract extension.

=== Real Madrid ===
"Rafael van der Vaart is a player of great quality, vision and talent. We are certain that he will be a player who will help us complement the already very strong squad we have."

— Ramón Calderón on Van der Vaart following his arrival at Real Madrid in August 2008.

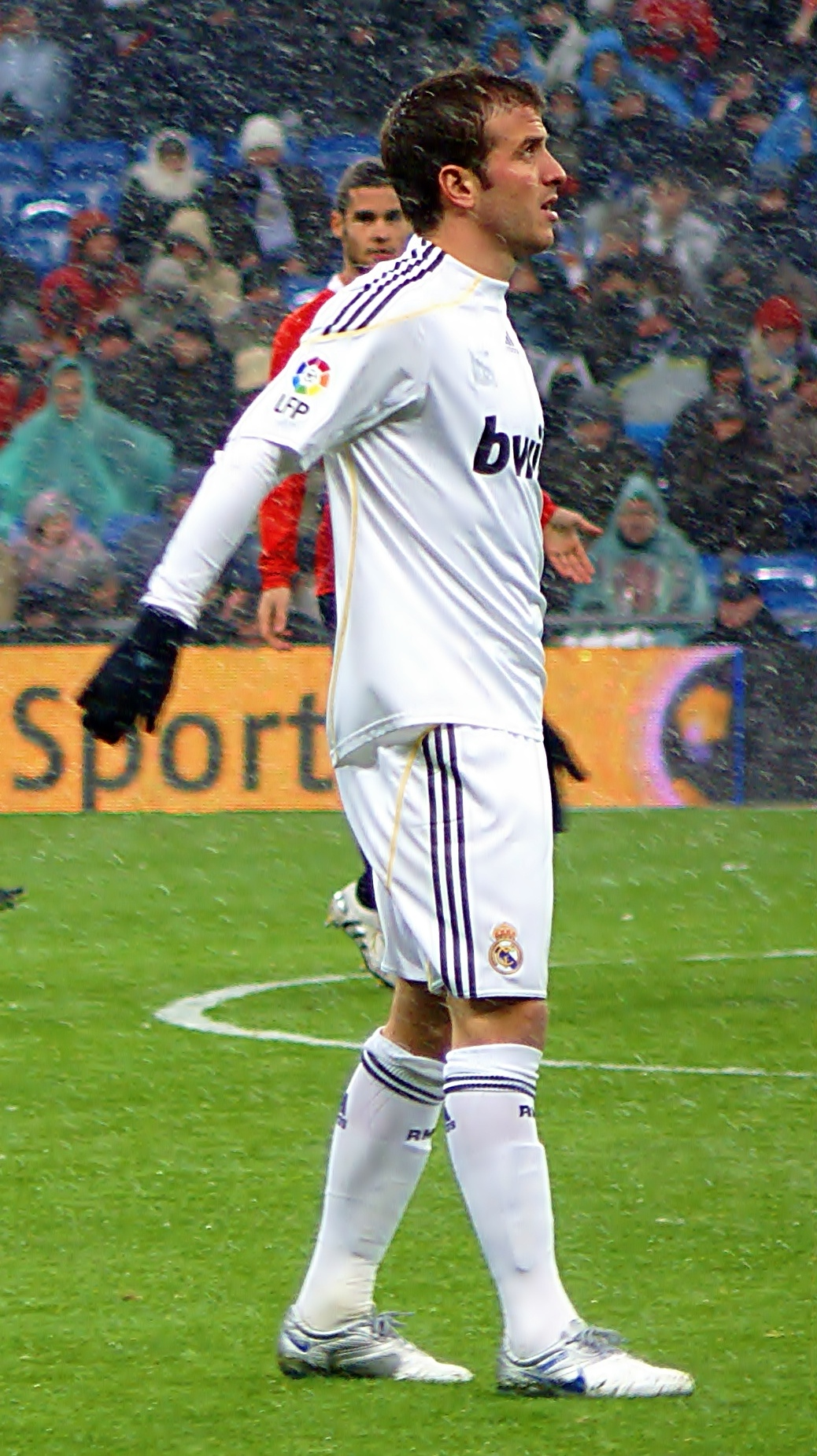
Van der Vaart in action for Real Madrid

Towards the end of the 2007–08 season, Van der Vaart was linked to a move to several clubs including Atlético Madrid and Juventus. Atlético made a €15 million bid for the Dutchman, which Hamburg rejected, and in the end, it was their cross-town rivals who got Van der Vaart's signature instead.

On 4 August 2008, Real Madrid and Hamburg reached a €13 million agreement for Van der Vaart's transfer, Real Madrid's only summer signing. He signed a five-year contract for an undisclosed amount. Van der Vaart debuted in a 2–1 pre-season win four days later, against Colombian side Independiente, where he scored the equalising goal and provided an assist for the winner.

He changed his squad number from 19 to his favoured number 23 after teammate Wesley Sneijder took number 10 following Robinho's departure to Manchester City on 31 August. He marked his league debut for Real Madrid with a strike against Numancia in a 4–3 victory. On 24 September, he scored his first career hat-trick in a 7–1 thrashing of Sporting de Gijón. In October 2008, Van der Vaart was one of the many La Liga players to be nominated for the Ballon d'Or, but the award eventually went to Manchester United forward and future teammate Cristiano Ronaldo. For the latter part of the 2008–09 season, Van der Vaart was mostly utilised as an impact substitute by coach Juande Ramos, which led to speculations of a fall-out between coach and player. Despite transfer rumours linking him with Arsenal, Chelsea and Liverpool, he denied having any links with the English clubs.

During the summer of 2009, it was speculated that van der Vaart would leave Real Madrid after being told he was not going to be part of the team's plans by coach Manuel Pellegrini. His number 23 jersey was even handed to Esteban Granero in preseason, leaving him without a squad number. Towards the end of the summer transfer window, however, he eventually came to an agreement with Real Madrid to stay with the club after the squad size had been reduced to 25 players as Dutch compatriots Sneijder, Arjen Robben and Klaas-Jan Huntelaar were forced to leave the club. Van der Vaart was handed his original number 23 jersey while Granero was given number 24. After a wait of four games, Van der Vaart was finally included in Pellegrini's squad list to face Villarreal on 23 September. An injury to Kaká gave Van der Vaart a chance to establish himself as a key player for Real Madrid again. On 20 December, he scored two goals in a 6–0 win against Real Zaragoza. He scored his last goal for Real Madrid against Málaga on 16 May 2010. Van der Vaart stated his desire to stay at Real Madrid, at least until the end of his contract.

=== Tottenham Hotspur ===
On 31 August 2010, two hours before the transfer window closed, Tottenham Hotspur made an offer of £8 million for Van der Vaart. According to Spurs manager Harry Redknapp, an £18 million transfer to Bayern Munich had collapsed the day before and Van der Vaart had suddenly become much cheaper, although such a price reduction was later denied by Real Madrid. Due to problems with computer servers used in the transaction between Tottenham and Real Madrid, preventing the necessary paperwork from being completed, Spurs requested special dispensation from the Premier League to allow the transfer to proceed. The Premier League confirmed on 1 September that the transfer had been permitted after they gave Tottenham special dispensation due to "technical problems". He signed a four-year contract at White Hart Lane. It was announced that Van der Vaart would wear the number 11 shirt for Spurs. Van der Vaart later denied speculation that he had been a failure at Real Madrid, stating that he always gave his best over the last few years for both club and country, and that he wanted to show his quality for his new club.

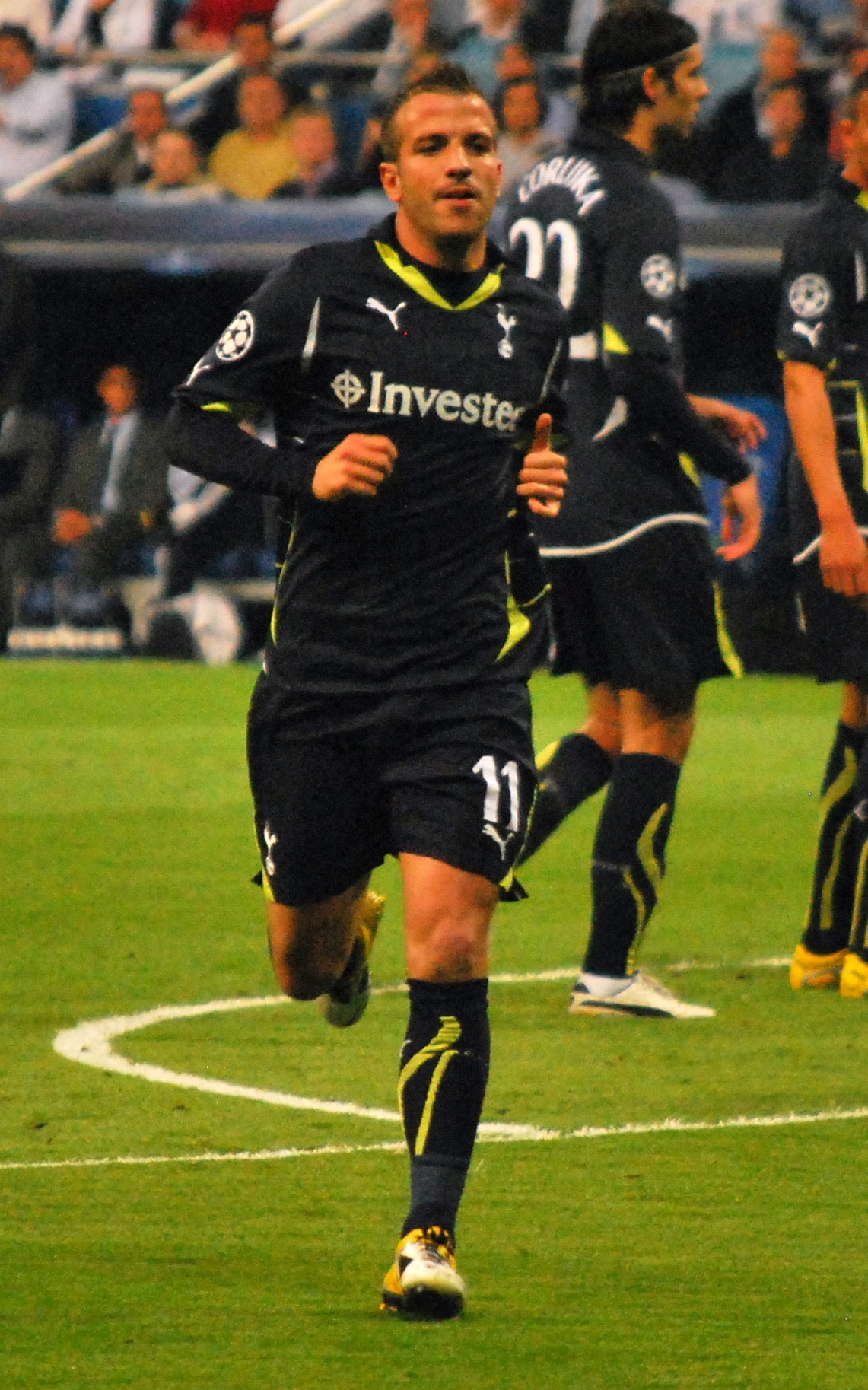
Van der Vaart with Tottenham Hotspur in 2011

Van der Vaart made his Premier League debut for Spurs in a 1–1 draw against West Bromwich Albion on 11 September 2010, and his Champions League bow for the club three days later against Werder Bremen, providing an assist for Peter Crouch in a 2–2 draw. Van der Vaart scored his first Premier League goal from the penalty spot in a 3–1 win against Wolverhampton Wanderers on 18 September. After starting his Spurs career by scoring three goals in four Premier League matches, and with a goal and an assist in two Champions League matches, Van der Vaart was named Goal.com World Player of the Week on 4 October 2010. He was later named Premier League Player of the Month for October.

A hamstring injury kept Van der Vaart out of action for much of December, but he returned to the Tottenham side on 26 December, scoring both goals in a 2–1 away win over Aston Villa. On 20 April 2011, Van der Vaart revived Tottenham's Champions League ambitions by scoring twice to hold North London rivals Arsenal to a 3–3 draw at White Hart Lane. After losing to Manchester City and being knocked out of the Champions League race, Spurs travelled to Anfield. Van der Vaart scored from 25 yards out in a 2–0 win that put Tottenham in position to secure qualification for the Europa League. He ended the season as Spurs' top scorer in the Premier League, scoring 13 goals – nearly a quarter of Tottenham's total – while also providing the most assists, with nine.

Van der Vaart scored his first two Premier League goals of the following season against Wigan Athletic and Arsenal. Van der Vaart scored a penalty away against Newcastle United on 16 October to keep up a good run of goal scoring form and also scored twice in the 2–1 win over Blackburn Rovers. On 30 October, scored in a 3–1 win over Queens Park Rangers, equalling a Tottenham record by scoring in five consecutive Premier League matches, a record he shares with Teddy Sheringham and Robbie Keane. On 31 December, he scored away to Swansea City, converting a Benoît Assou-Ekotto cross. Van der Vaart scored a long-range effort against Watford in the FA Cup to send Tottenham through to the next round of the competition with a 1–0 victory. He was on the pitch at White Hart Lane on 17 March 2012 when Bolton Wanderers midfielder Fabrice Muamba went into cardiac arrest; Van der Vaart later described it as "horrible to witness ... the absolute low in my football career".

=== Return to Hamburg ===
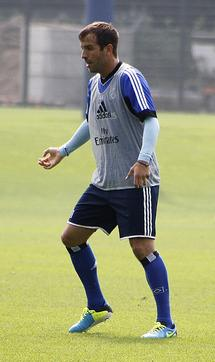
Van der Vaart with Hamburg in 2013

On 31 August 2012, Van der Vaart returned to his former club, Hamburger SV. He would wear his favourite 23 number on the shirt and was announced as club's vice-captain. On 16 September, he made his second debut with HSV in a match against Eintracht Frankfurt. On 22 September, Van der Vaart provided two assists against Borussia Dortmund, contributing to two crucial goals in a 3–2 win. He scored his first goal of the season in a 2–2 away draw against Borussia Mönchengladbach, later suffering a serious injury that left him out of action for several months.

Van der Vaart made his return to action on 20 January 2013 against Nürnberg in a 1–1 draw. On 9 April, he was named the club's captain, succeeding Heiko Westermann. Not having scored for almost two months, Van der Vaart scored a brace on 20 April 2013 against Fortuna Düsseldorf in a 2–1 home win. Hamburg later decided not to give van der Vaart a contract extension.

=== Real Betis ===
Van der Vaart joined newly promoted Spanish club Real Betis on a free transfer in June 2015. He made his debut for the club on 24 September in a 2–1 La Liga defeat to Deportivo. His performance turned out to be a fiasco. He finally left the club on 30 June 2016, accumulating just 296 minutes of playing time in the 2015–2016 season.

=== FC Midtjylland ===
On 31 July 2016, Van der Vaart was spotted in a skybox at MCH Arena just outside Herning alongside agents Alan Hvedehave and Mikkel Beckmann, both before and during the league game between Danish Superliga clubs FC Midtjylland and Silkeborg. Following the match, in a live interview with Danish Eurosport 2, Midtjylland sporting director Claus Steinlein denied any ongoing negotiations, stating that Midtjylland would not be able to live up to Van der Vaart's economic demands. Just four days later, however, ahead of the 2016–17 UEFA Europa League third round qualifying match against Videoton, Steinlein confirmed that the club was in fact trying to work out a deal with him.

On 10 August, Van der Vaart joined Midtjylland on a two-year deal. Eighteen days later, he made his Superliga debut, as a substitute for Paul Onuachu in a 0–0 draw away to local rivals Viborg. Less than a month later, in his fourth appearance for his new side, he scored his first goal in a 5–2 win at home against promoted team Horsens. After coming in as a substitute in a match against Lyngby on 28 May 2017 he was selected for only one of the first team's matches until 9 February 2018 where he was on the bench in a 2–0 win against Horsens. On 18 February 2018 Van der Vaart made his first appearance for the first team in the 2017–18 season coming in as a substitute in the 90th minute. He told NOS, "I wasn't selected for half a year. That's why this is a celebration for me. Not playing is awful."

=== Esbjerg ===
On 4 August 2018 it was made public that Van der Vaart had signed a one-year contract with Esbjerg in the same league. He had been training with them since his FC Midtjylland had ended. He was presented to the fans at the Esbjerg Stadium before a league game against Randers, which ended in a 3–3 draw. On 4 November, having been struggling with recurring injuries, he announced he would retire from professional football with immediate effect.

On 22 August 2019 Van der Vaart confirmed, that he would play a game for Esbjerg's reserves in the ninth tier of football in Denmark. Due to his relationship with handball player Estavana Polman, he was still living in Esbjerg, as she was playing for Team Esbjerg.

== International career ==
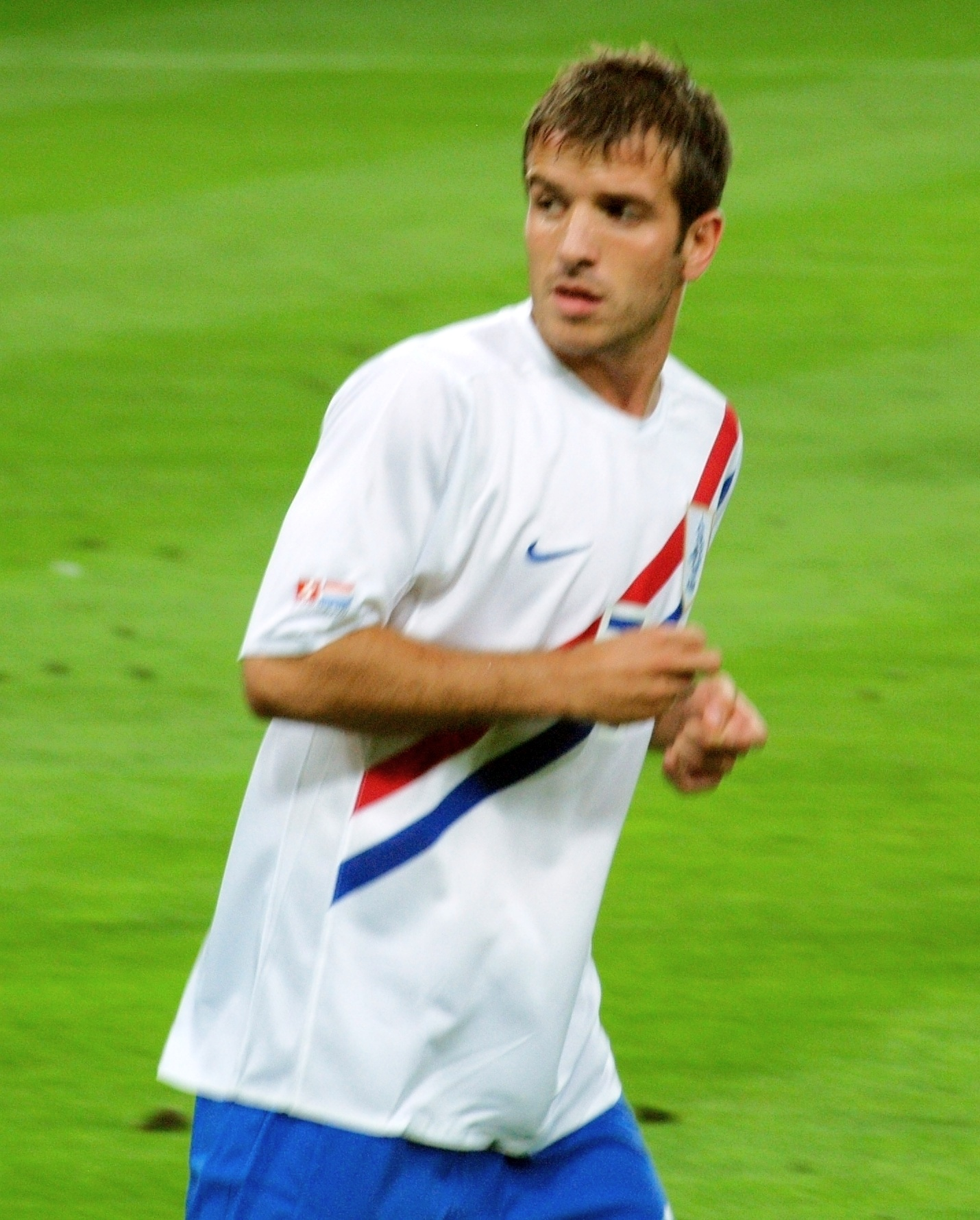
Van der Vaart with Oranje.

Van der Vaart gained the notice of the youth team coaches and was called up for the youth squads. He played in the 2001 FIFA World Youth Championship with present senior teammates Maarten Stekelenburg and John Heitinga and former Real Madrid teammates Klaas-Jan Huntelaar and Arjen Robben.

The 18-year-old Van der Vaart then made his senior international debut against Andorra on 6 October 2001. He was a member of the squads that participated in Euro 2004, Euro 2008, Euro 2012, the 2006 World Cup and the 2010 World Cup. Despite figuring prominently in a number of qualifying stage matches, Van der Vaart has had a lack of luck when it came to the final tournament. He was however, vice-captain during the 2010 World Cup and Euro 2012 behind Giovanni van Bronckhorst and Mark van Bommel respectively. On 15 August 2012, Van der Vaart earned his 100th cap for the Netherlands in the 2–4 loss against Belgium in a friendly match.

Van der Vaart was used to wear the number 23 or 10 jersey while playing for his country.

=== Euro 2004 ===
A sub-par performance by the Dutch during their opening game of Euro 2004 persuaded then manager Dick Advocaat to change the side's formation into one which he felt the talented Van der Vaart did not fit into. With Advocaat's new system seemingly working, Van der Vaart would be reduced to play a bit-part role at Euro 2004, as Oranje reached the semi-finals before losing to hosts Portugal.

=== 2006 World Cup ===
Despite that setback, Van der Vaart produced some superlative performances in the Bundesliga the following season, and it seemed that Van der Vaart's turn to shine on the big stage was to finally come – at the 2006 World Cup. However, niggling injury problems resurfaced, and Van der Vaart was not risked by Dutch coach Marco van Basten for the opening World Cup encounter against Serbia and Montenegro. With victory in that opening game, the national team coach would once again decide to continue fielding a "Van der Vaart-less" lineup. And once again, Van der Vaart was reduced to a bit-part role in the squad as they exited the competition in the round of 16 against Portugal.

=== Euro 2008 ===
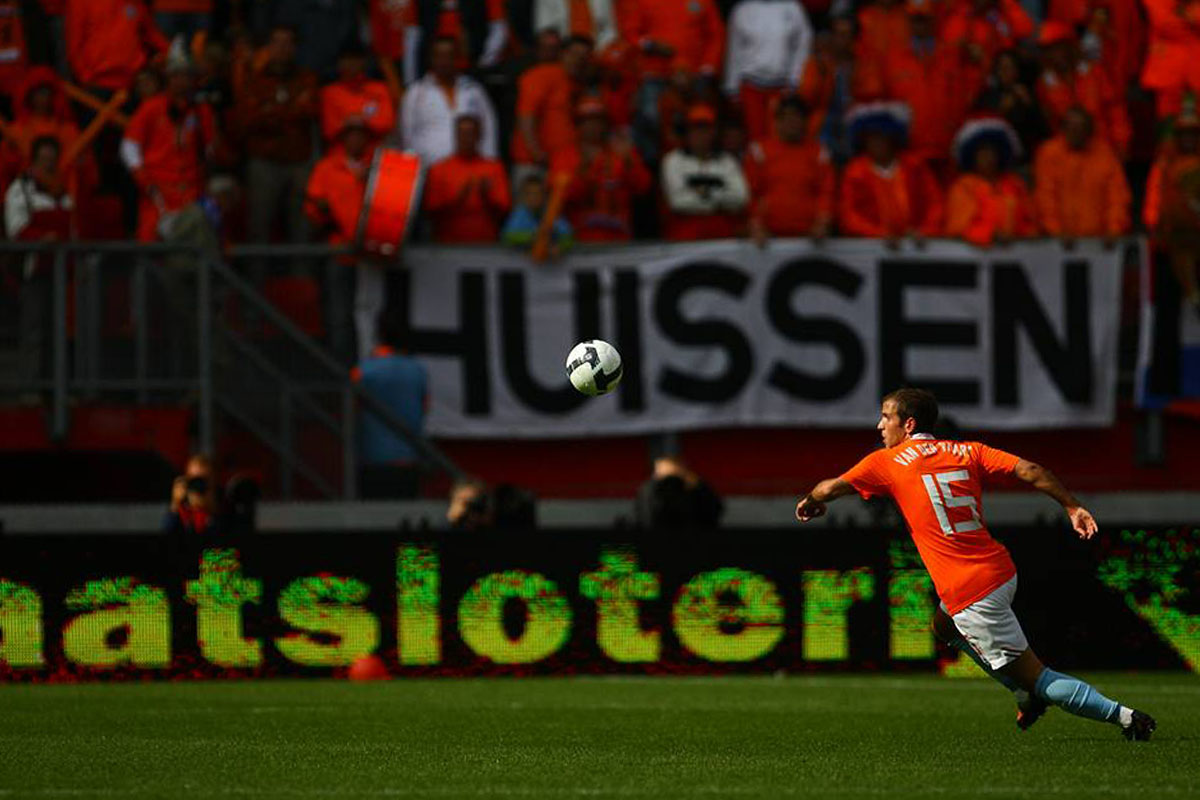
Van der Vaart playing for the Netherlands

Van der Vaart was called up for Euro 2008 despite missing several qualification matches due to an ankle injury. As Van Basten had decided to change their formation to 4–2–3–1, Van der Vaart was deployed in the midfield along with Wesley Sneijder and either Dirk Kuyt or Robin van Persie, behind lone striker Ruud van Nistelrooy to great effect. In the opening game of the competition, the Dutch team won 3–0 against the world champions Italy with Van der Vaart playing a role in the build-ups. Van Basten decided to field him again in the starting line-up in the next match against France; the Oranje later went on to win 4–1. Despite an impressive group stage performance, the Dutch suffered a disappointing quarter-final exit at the hands of Russia.

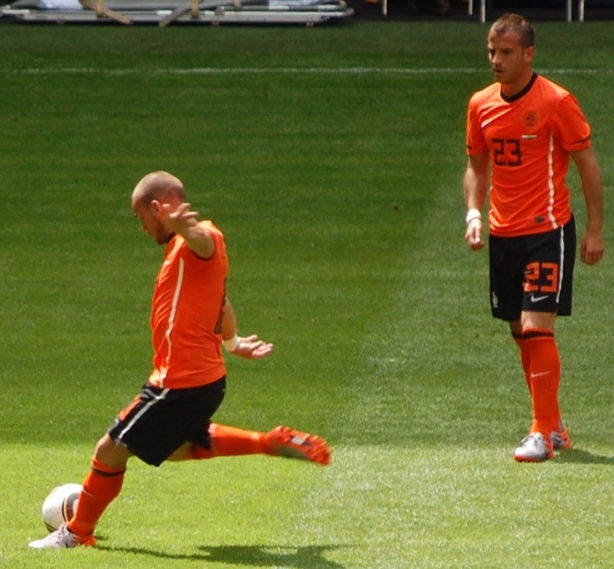
Van der Vaart (right) with Wesley Sneijder.

=== 2010 World Cup ===
Despite enduring a tough time at club level, Van der Vaart remained a first-choice player for Van Basten's successor Bert van Marwijk in the 2010 World Cup qualifiers. On 10 September 2008, he ended a ten-month goal drought with a vital strike against Macedonia in a 2–1 win. He ended the campaign with 2 goals and several important assists. On 12 August 2009, Van der Vaart captained the Dutch in the absence of Giovanni van Bronckhorst in a friendly against England. He scored the second goal off a Gareth Barry mistake to put the Netherlands two goals up in the first half but Jermain Defoe netted a brace to seal a 2–2 draw. Van der Vaart was in the starting line-up for the three group matches in the 2010 World Cup, against Denmark, Japan and Cameroon, but eventually lost his spot in the starting line-up to his recently recovered fellow midfielder Arjen Robben after being substituted in the match against Cameroon. He was brought off the pitch after giving away a penalty to Cameroon by blocking the ball with his arm from a free-kick. However, he made another appearance in the semi-final against Uruguay, after coming on for the injured Demy de Zeeuw. He helped Oranje win the match 3–2, thus sending them to the final. He also played in the final against Spain, substituting Nigel de Jong just before injury time. Netherlands lost the game 1–0 to a goal from Andrés Iniesta. He was handed the captain's armband during the match, after Giovanni van Bronckhorst was substituted off.

=== Euro 2012 ===
Van der Vaart made his Euro 2012 debut as a sub in the first match against Denmark – a match they went on to lose. In the second match against Germany, again he was a substitute, but came on for Dutch captain Mark van Bommel and took the captain's armband. In the second half he created more attacking chances, which led to a goal, but they again lost the match. In the final group match against Portugal, Van der Vaart started as captain, and scored a goal that gave the Netherlands a glimmer of hope to get out of the group. However, two goals from Cristiano Ronaldo gave Portugal a 2–1 win and knocked out the Netherlands.

=== 2014 World Cup ===
Van der Vaart was named in Louis van Gaal's provisional 30-man squad for the 2014 World Cup, but withdrew on 28 May, three days before the final squad was named, due to a calf injury that he suffered in training.

== Style of play ==
Rafael van der Vaart is widely regarded as one of the finest Dutch attacking midfielders of his generation, noted for his tactical intelligence, exceptional technical ability, and goalscoring instinct. Operating primarily as a classic number 10, his playing style combined traditional playmaking attributes with a distinct threat inside the penalty box. Throughout his career, Van der Vaart was deployed predominantly as an attacking midfielder or second striker. He excelled in the "hole" between the opposition’s midfield and defensive lines. Rather than relying on explosive pace or physical power, he utilized superior positional awareness and spatial intelligence to find pockets of space from which he could orchestrate his team's offensive play. A hallmark of Van der Vaart’s game was his elite technical proficiency. He possessed an exceptional first touch and ball control, allowing him to operate effectively under intense defensive pressure. He was a highly creative passer, capable of executing intricate short-combination plays as well as delivering sweeping, diagonal long-range balls to unlock opposing defenses. He was also a renowned dead-ball specialist, frequently taking responsibility for penalties, corner kicks, and direct free-kicks, which he struck with immense precision using his favored left foot. Unlike many traditional playmakers who prioritized assists, Van der Vaart was a prolific goalscorer from midfield. He was noted for his clean ball-striking ability, which made him dangerous from long distance. Additionally, he possessed the instincts of a forward, frequently timing late runs into the penalty box to finish off attacking moves.

== Personal life ==
On 10 June 2005, Van der Vaart married Sylvie Meis and on 28 May 2006, their son Damián Rafael was born. Some of the media have described the couple as the "new Beckhams" but both of them denied the claims saying that they prefer to just live a normal life.

In the summer of 2009, Real Madrid wanted to sell Van der Vaart, but the player decided to stay in Madrid because his wife was undergoing cancer treatment there. A year later, upon his move to England, Van der Vaart stated, "She had a very serious illness and it is true that she had to be treated at the Clinica Quiron. Last season, they wanted me to leave but I couldn't leave for that reason. Now she is well and the only thing that happened was that Madrid wanted to sell and I wanted to get back to enjoying playing football, and Tottenham are a great team that are going to give me the football opportunities that I need."

In 2010, Van der Vaart found out through emails that his wife was having an affair with a KLM airline pilot. On New Year's Eve 2012, Van der Vaart and his wife separated. Their son Damián signed for the youth team of Ajax in September 2023.

Since August 2016, Van der Vaart has been in a relationship with Dutch handball player Estavana Polman who played for Danish club Team Esbjerg. This was the main reason he moved to Denmark and chose to play for Midtjylland. On 27 December 2016, they announced that they were expecting a child. Their daughter Jesslynn was born in June 2017.

== Awards ==
In October 2002, Dutch magazine Voetbal International conducted a poll to decide who was the best Dutch talent. Van der Vaart received an overwhelming 73% of the votes, while Arjen Robben came second with 12% and forward Robin van Persie was third with 6% of the votes.

== Coaching career ==
On 10 August 2021, Van der Vaart was hired in his first coaching role as an assistant coach to Peter Hyballa at his former club Esbjerg. Van der Vaart had lived in Esbjerg for the past five years due to his relationship with handball player Estavana Polman, who was playing for Team Esbjerg. On 27 January 2023 the club confirmed, that Van der Vaart's contract had been terminated by mutual agreement.

== Darts career ==
In April 2019, Van der Vaart began a professional darts career, joining the British Darts Organisation. On 4 May, Van der Vaart made his debut at the Denmark Open, winning his first round match 4–2 against Thomas Anderson before being knocked out in the second round 4–0 by Mogens Christensen.

== Media controversies ==
=== Appearance on Studio Voetbal ===
In May 2026, Van der Vaart drew attention for his appearance as a guest on the final national television broadcast of Studio Voetbal, after viewers speculated on social media that he had been under the influence of alcohol. On the radio programme De Coen & Sander Show, he confirmed that he had drunk “two or three glasses of wine” before the broadcast and said they had affected him “more heavily than normal”.

=== Remark about Japanese footballers ===
In June 2026, Van der Vaart came under criticism for a remark made while working as a pundit for NOS TV during the Netherlands’ 2–2 draw with Japan. While analysing Japan's late equaliser, in which Micky van de Ven had lost track of his Japanese opponent, he said of the Japanese players: “They all look alike, of course, maybe he thought that.” Van der Vaart later apologised, stating that it had never been his intention to offend, hurt or discriminate against anyone.

== Career statistics ==
=== Club ===
Appearances and goals by club, season and competition
Club	Season	League			National cup (Note: Includes KNVB Cup, DFB-Pokal, Copa del Rey, FA Cup, Danish Cup)		League cup (Note: Includes DFL-Ligapokal, Football League Cup)		Europe		Other		Total	
Club	Season	Division	Apps	Goals	Apps	Goals	Apps	Goals	Apps	Goals	Apps	Goals	Apps	Goals
Ajax	1999–2000	Eredivisie	1	0	0	0	—		0	0	—		1	0
Ajax	2000–01	Eredivisie	27	7	1	0	—		4 (Note: Appearances in UEFA Cup)	2	—		32	9
Ajax	2001–02	Eredivisie	20	14	2	2	—		5	1	—		27	17
Ajax	2002–03	Eredivisie	21	18	2	0	—		6 (Note: Appearances in UEFA Champions League)	2	1 (Note: Appearance in Johan Cruyff Shield)	2	30	22
Ajax	2003–04	Eredivisie	26	7	1	0	—		7	1	—		34	8
Ajax	2004–05	Eredivisie	22	6	2	0	—		7	1	1	0	32	7
Ajax	Total		117	52	8	2	—		29	7	2	2	156	63
Hamburger SV	2005–06	Bundesliga	19	9	2	0	—		8	5	7	2	36	16
Hamburger SV	2006–07	Bundesliga	26	8	0	0	2	0	5	3	—		33	11
Hamburger SV	2007–08	Bundesliga	29	12	4	4	—		9	3	2	2	44	21
Hamburger SV	Total		74	29	6	4	2	0	22	11	9	4	113	48
Real Madrid	2008–09	La Liga	32	5	1	0	—		7	0	2 (Note: Appearances in Supercopa de España)	0	42	5
Real Madrid	2009–10	La Liga	26	6	2	1	—		3	0	—		31	7
Real Madrid	Total		58	11	3	1	—		10	0	2	0	73	12
Tottenham Hotspur	2010–11	Premier League	28	13	1	0	0	0	7	2	—		36	15
Tottenham Hotspur	2011–12	Premier League	33	11	4	1	1	0	1 (Note: Appearance in UEFA Europa League)	1	—		39	13
Tottenham Hotspur	2012–13	Premier League	2	0	0	0	0	0	0	0	—		2	0
Tottenham Hotspur	Total		63	24	5	1	1	0	8	3	—		77	28
Hamburger SV	2012–13	Bundesliga	27	5	0	0	—		—		—		27	5
Hamburger SV	2013–14	Bundesliga	27	7	3	1	—		—		2 (Note: Appearances in Bundesliga relegation play-offs)	0	32	8
Hamburger SV	2014–15	Bundesliga	24	4	2	1	—		—		1	0	27	5
Hamburger SV	Total		78	16	5	2	—		—		3	0	86	18
Real Betis	2015–16	La Liga	7	0	2	0	—		—		—		9	0
Midtjylland	2016–17	Danish Superliga	15	2	2	0	—		1	0	—		18	2
Midtjylland	2017–18	Danish Superliga	2	0	0	0	—		0	0	—		2	0
Midtjylland	Total		17	2	2	0	—		1	0	—		20	2
Esbjerg	2018–19	Danish Superliga	3	0	1	0	—		—		—		4	0
Career total			417	135	32	10	3	0	70	21	16	6	538	171

=== International ===
Appearances and goals by national team and year
National team	Year	Apps	Goals
Netherlands	2001	1	0
Netherlands	2002	2	0
Netherlands	2003	10	3
Netherlands	2004	13	1
Netherlands	2005	9	2
Netherlands	2006	5	1
Netherlands	2007	10	5
Netherlands	2008	14	1
Netherlands	2009	10	2
Netherlands	2010	14	1
Netherlands	2011	5	1
Netherlands	2012	10	4
Netherlands	2013	6	4
Total		109	25

Scores and results list Netherlands's goal tally first, score column indicates score after each van der Vaart goal.

List of international goals scored by Rafael van der Vaart
No.	Date	Venue	Opponent	Score	Result	Competition
1	6 September 2003	De Kuip, Rotterdam, Netherlands	Austria	1–0	3–1	UEFA Euro 2004 qualification
2	10 September 2003	Toyota Arena, Prague, Czech Republic	Czech Republic	1–2	1–3	UEFA Euro 2004 qualification
3	11 October 2003	Philips Stadion, Eindhoven, Netherlands	Moldova	4–0	5–0	UEFA Euro 2004 qualification
4	1 June 2004	Olympique de la Pontaise, Lausanne, Switzerland	Faroe Islands	1–0	3–0	Friendly
5	7 September 2005	Philips Stadion, Eindhoven, Netherlands	Andorra	1–0	4–0	2006 FIFA World Cup qualification
6	8 October 2005	Toyota Arena, Prague, Czech Republic	Czech Republic	1–0	2–0	2006 FIFA World Cup qualification
7	15 November 2006	Amsterdam Arena, Amsterdam, Netherlands	England	1–1	1–1	Friendly
8	7 February 2007	Amsterdam Arena, Amsterdam, Netherlands	Russia	4–1	4–1	Friendly
9	2 June 2007	Seoul World Cup Stadium, Seoul, South Korea	South Korea	1–0	2–0	Friendly
10	2 June 2007	Seoul World Cup Stadium, Seoul, South Korea	South Korea	2–0	2–0	Friendly
11	6 June 2007	Rajamangala Stadium, Bangkok, Thailand	Thailand	1–0	3–1	Friendly
12	21 November 2007	Dinamo Stadium, Minsk, Belarus	Belarus	1–2	1–2	UEFA Euro 2008 qualification
13	10 September 2008	Philip II Arena, Skopje, Republic of Macedonia	North Macedonia	2–0	2–1	2010 FIFA World Cup qualification
14	1 April 2009	Amsterdam Arena, Amsterdam, Netherlands	North Macedonia	4–0	4–0	2010 FIFA World Cup qualification
15	12 August 2009	Amsterdam Arena, Amsterdam, Netherlands	England	2–0	2–2	Friendly
16	1 June 2010	De Kuip, Rotterdam, Netherlands	Ghana	2–0	4–1	Friendly
17	25 March 2011	Ferenc Puskás Stadium, Budapest, Hungary	Hungary	1–0	4–0	UEFA Euro 2012 qualification
18	30 May 2012	De Kuip, Rotterdam, Netherlands	Slovakia	1–0	2–0	Friendly
19	17 June 2012	Metalist Stadium, Kharkiv, Ukraine	Portugal	1–0	1–2	UEFA Euro 2012
20	12 October 2012	De Kuip, Rotterdam, Netherlands	Andorra	1–0	3–0	2014 FIFA World Cup qualification
21	16 October 2012	Arena Națională, Bucharest, Romania	Romania	3–1	4–1	2014 FIFA World Cup qualification
22	22 March 2013	Amsterdam Arena, Amsterdam, Netherlands	Estonia	1–0	3–0	2014 FIFA World Cup qualification
23	26 March 2013	Amsterdam Arena, Amsterdam, Netherlands	Romania	1–0	4–0	2014 FIFA World Cup qualification
24	11 October 2013	Amsterdam Arena, Amsterdam, Netherlands	Hungary	7–1	8–1	2014 FIFA World Cup qualification
25	16 November 2013	Cristal Arena, Genk, Belgium	Japan	1–0	2–2	Friendly

=== Managerial ===
As of match played 30 June 2022

Managerial record by team and tenure
Team	Nat	From	To	Record							
Team	Nat	From	To	G	W	D	L	GF	GA	GD	Win %
Esbjerg (interim)	(Denmark)	9 March 2022	30 June 2022	6	0	4	2	5	8	−3	0.00
Career total				6	0	4	2	5	8	−3	0.00

== Honours ==
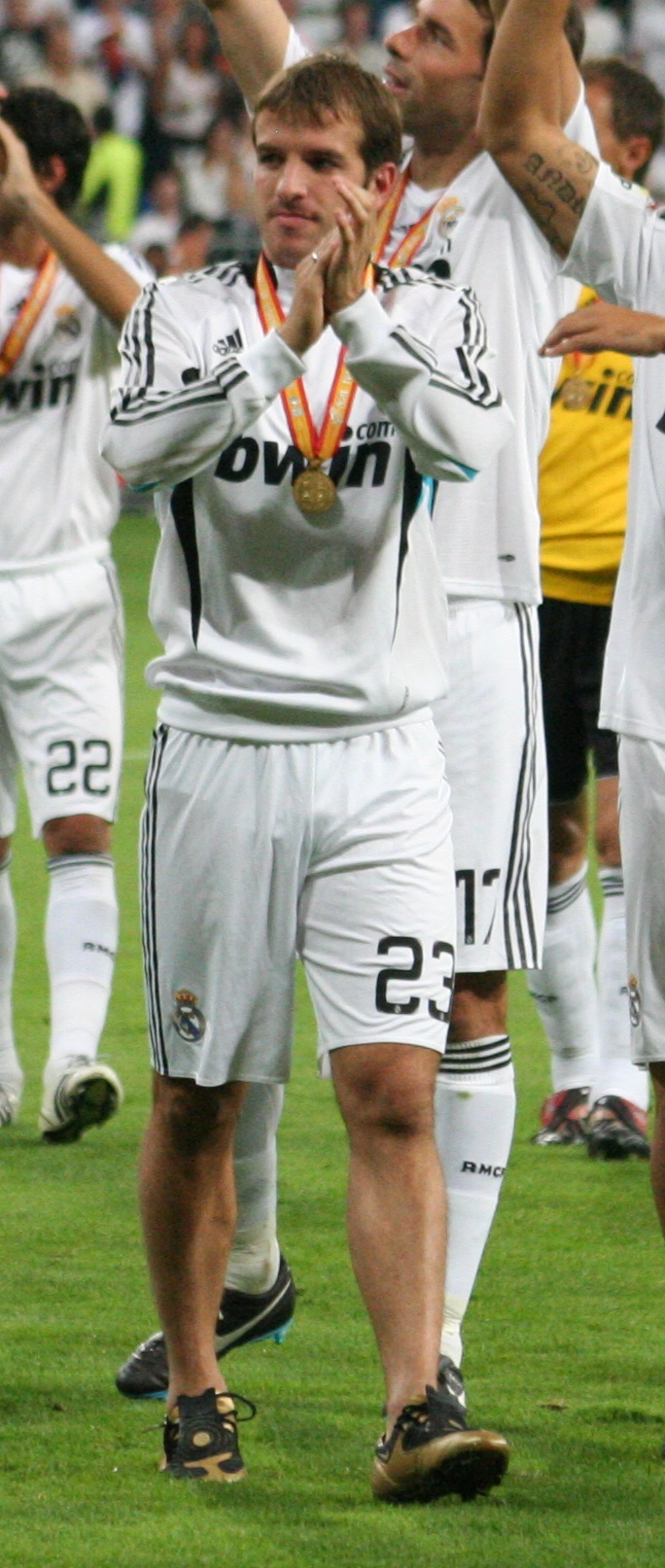
Van der Vaart won the Spanish Super Cup while at Real Madrid

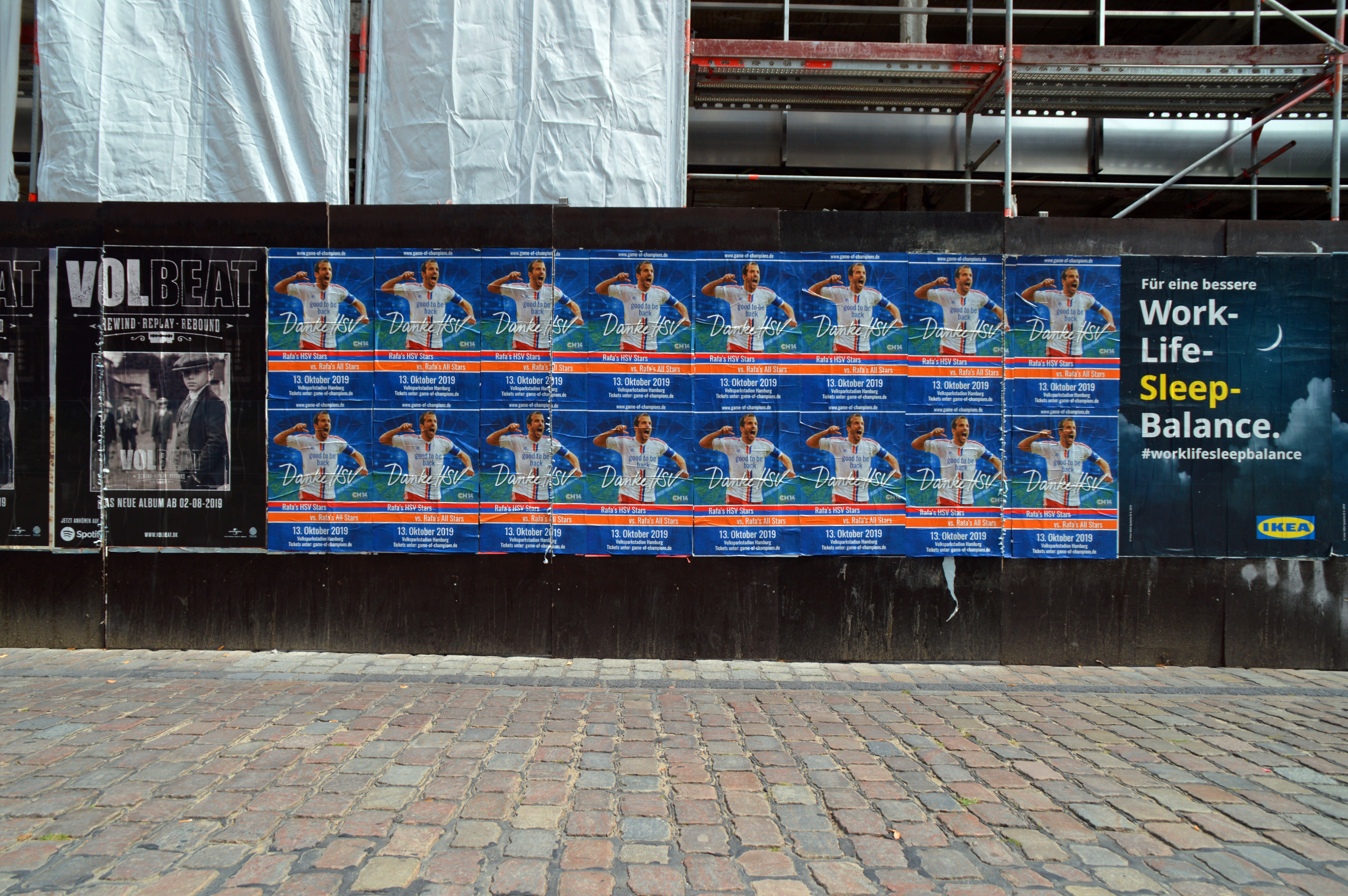
Posters farewell match Rafael van der Vaart at football club Hamburger SV. Hamburg

Ajax

- Eredivisie: 2001–02, 2003–04
- KNVB Cup: 2001–02
- Johan Cruyff Shield: 2002

Hamburger SV

- UEFA Intertoto Cup: 2005, 2007

Real Madrid

- Supercopa de España: 2008

FC Midtjylland

- Danish Superliga: 2017–18

Netherlands

- FIFA World Cup runner-up: 2010

Individual

- Ajax Talent of the Future (Sjaak Swart Award) 1999–2000
- Ajax Talent of the Year (Marco van Basten Award): 2000–01
- Ajax Player of the Year (Rinus Michels Award): 2001–02
- Amsterdam Talent of the Year: 2000
- Amsterdam Sportsman of the year: 2001
- Amsterdam Tournament Most Valuable Player: 2001
- Dutch Football Talent of the Year: 2001
- European Talent of the Year: 2002
- Golden Boy: 2003
- Bundesliga Player of the Month: September 2005
- Premier League Player of the Month: October 2010

== See also ==
- List of footballers with 100 or more caps
- List of European association football families
