= Jamal Akachar =

Dutch-Moroccan footballer (born 1982)

Personal information
- Date of birth: 14 October 1982 (age 44)
- Place of birth: Breda, Netherlands
- Height: 1.85 m (6 ft 1 in)
- Position: Winger

Youth career
- –2002: Ajax

Senior career*
Years	Team	Apps	(Gls)
2002–2004	Ajax	2	(0)
2004–2007	→ SC Cambuur	29	(5)
2007–2008	Moghreb Tétouan	28	(5)
- * Club domestic league appearances and goals as of 18 May 2008 ‡ National team caps and goals as of 18 May 2008

Jamal Akachar (born 14 October 1982 in Breda) is a retired Dutch-Moroccan footballer.

== Club career ==
He started his career for Ajax, where he made his debut against FC Groningen on 1 September 2002 while still an amateur and making a living as a taxi-driver. In July 2004 he left Ajax and moved to SC Cambuur and after 3 years in Leeuwarden he was released by the club after he spent a night in jail for alleged embezzlement. He signed in January 2008 a 3-year contract by Moghreb Tétouan, but returned to the Netherlands after the club failed to pay his wages.
