= Ferdi Vierklau =

Dutch footballer

Personal information
- Full name: Ferdinand Rudols Marcel Vierklau
- Date of birth: 1 April 1973 (age 53)
- Place of birth: Bilthoven, Netherlands
- Height: 1.78 m (5 ft 10 in)
- Position: Right back

Youth career
- FAK
- USV Elinkwijk

Senior career*
Years	Team	Apps	(Gls)
1991–1996	Utrecht	117	(4)
1996–1997	Vitesse	30	(1)
1997–1998	Tenerife	32	(1)
1999–2002	Ajax	38	(0)
Total		217	(6)

International career
1996–1997	Netherlands	2	(0)
- * Club domestic league appearances and goals

Ferdinand 'Ferdi' Rudols Marcel Vierklau (born 1 April 1973) is a Dutch retired footballer who played as a right back.

== Club career ==
Vierklau was born in Bilthoven, Utrecht. In his country, he played for FC Utrecht, Vitesse Arnhem and AFC Ajax (March 1999 to June 2002), appearing in 185 Eredivisie matches over 11 seasons and scoring five goals; he won the double with the Amsterdam club in the 2001–02 campaign, but was already a fringe player at the time.

Vierklau also played one and a half seasons with CD Tenerife in Spain, being relegated in his second year in La Liga and subsequently signing with Ajax. He retired at the age of 29.

== International career ==
Vierklau earned two caps for the Netherlands, in a period of eight months. His debut was on 5 October 1996, as he played 71 minutes in a 3–1 away win against Wales for the 1998 FIFA World Cup qualification stages.

== Honours ==
Ajax

- Eredivisie: 2001–02
- KNVB Cup: 1998–99, 2001–02
