= Daniel Cruz (footballer, born 1981) =

Colombian footballer (born 1981)

Personal information
- Full name: Daniel Alberto Cruz Castro
- Date of birth: 3 May 1981 (age 45)
- Place of birth: Cali, Colombia
- Height: 1.77 m (5 ft 10 in)
- Position: Midfielder

Youth career
- Tucumán
- América de Cali
- 1998–2000: Ajax

Senior career*
Years	Team	Apps	(Gls)
2000–2003	Ajax	13	(2)
2002	→ Germinal Beerschot (loan)	11	(0)
2003–2011	Germinal Beerschot	173	(10)
2005	→ Lierse (loan)	12	(0)
2011	FC Dallas	10	(1)
2012–2013	Waasland-Beveren	9	(0)
- * Club domestic league appearances and goals

Daniel Alberto Cruz Castro (born 3 May 1981) is a Colombian former professional footballer who played as a midfielder.

== Career ==
=== Youth career ===
Cruz played his early football at the Academia de Fútbol Tucumán in his hometown of Cali. His father, a retired Argentinian professional football player, was his primary coaching influence. In 1998, Cruz was discovered by an Ajax scout while training with the first team at América de Cali. Within two weeks, at 17, the young Colombian had signed with the Dutch club's youth reserve program.

=== Ajax ===
Cruz made his first team debut for Ajax during the 2000–01 season after two years with the club's youth reserve program. That season, he played in eleven matches for the Ajax first team before being sidelined with a knee injury. A head coaching change during his rehabilitation undermined the possibility of Cruz returning to the first team ranks at Ajax. Eventually he was loaned and later sold to Belgian club Germinal Beerschot.

=== Germinal Beerschot ===
Since his move from Ajax in 2002, until the expiration of his final contract with the club in 2011, Cruz established himself as one of the most prolific players in Germinal Beerschot club history. His time there spanned nearly a decade – having made over 250 appearances for the club in all competitions. Cruz was considered a trendsetter in the Belgian Pro League. The South American midfielder was known as a play-maker with charisma and modesty.

In 2005, Cruz captained Germinal Beerschot to a Belgian Cup title.

=== Lierse ===
After winning the Belgian Cup in 2005, Cruz shocked fans and the media when he announced that he had signed a contract with rival club Lierse for the following season. The deal was rumored to be one of the largest contracts in Belgian Pro League history. Financial troubles at Lierse halfway through the 2005–06 season led to the club actually selling Cruz back to Germinal Beerschot after only six months of his three-year deal.

=== FC Dallas ===
On 4 August 2011, it was announced that Cruz had signed with FC Dallas of American Major League Soccer. Cruz scored his first goal for his new club on 14 September 2011, in a 1–1 draw against Tauro. The goal was just 27 seconds into the match officially making it the quickest strike in FC Dallas club history.

== Personal life ==
Cruz is the son of retired Argentinian football player José Luis Cruz who played for River Plate and América de Cali. In January 2009, Voetbal magazine produced a cover story featuring an extensive interview with Cruz. The article highlighted the Colombian's role at his club, his recent injuries, and his love for Germinal Beerschot.

== Honours ==
Beerschot A.C.

- Belgian Cup: 2004–05
