= Jan van Halst =

Dutch footballer

Personal information
- Full name: Johannes Marinus van Halst
- Date of birth: 20 April 1969 (age 57)
- Place of birth: Utrecht
- Height: 1.77 m (5 ft 9 1/2 in)
- Position: Midfielder

Youth career
- –1979: VV Jonathan
- 1979–1989: Utrecht

Senior career*
Years	Team	Apps	(Gls)
1988–1989	Utrecht	9	(0)
1989–1990	Wageningen	30	(2)
1990–1999	Twente	223	(19)
1999–2002	Ajax	36	(0)
2000–2001	→ Fortuna Sittard (loan)	24	(1)
2002–2003	Vitesse	13	(0)
Total		335	(22)

International career
1988	Netherlands U21	1	(0)
- * Club domestic league appearances and goals

Johannes Marinus "Jan" van Halst (born 20 April 1969) is a former Dutch professional football player and current television show host and sports analyst for Ziggo Sport. He previously held positions as financial manager and general manager of the Dutch football club Twente. He also worked as commercial and technical director at the club.

On August 13, 2021, it was announced that he would participate in the Dutch TV-show Expeditie Robinson: a well-known survival programme featuring famous Dutch people.

== Club career ==
Jan Van Halst grew up in Zeist and started his youth career at local outfit VV Jonathan, but then moved to Utrecht. He had his breakthough at Eerste Divisie club Wageningen, which earned him a move to FC Twente where he would have the longest spell of his playing career. He then joined Dutch powerhouse Ajax in 1999, only for them to send him on loan to Fortuna Sittard in November 2000 after manager Co Adriaanse deemed van Halst not good enough for the Amsterdammers. He finished his career at Vitesse in 2003.

== International career ==
Van Halst made one appearance for the Netherlands national U-21 team when he played the full 90 minutes against Iceland in what ended in a 0–3 loss.

== Honours ==
Ajax

Eredivisie: 2001–02
KNVB Cup: 2001–02
