= Cedric van der Gun =

Dutch footballer (born 1979)

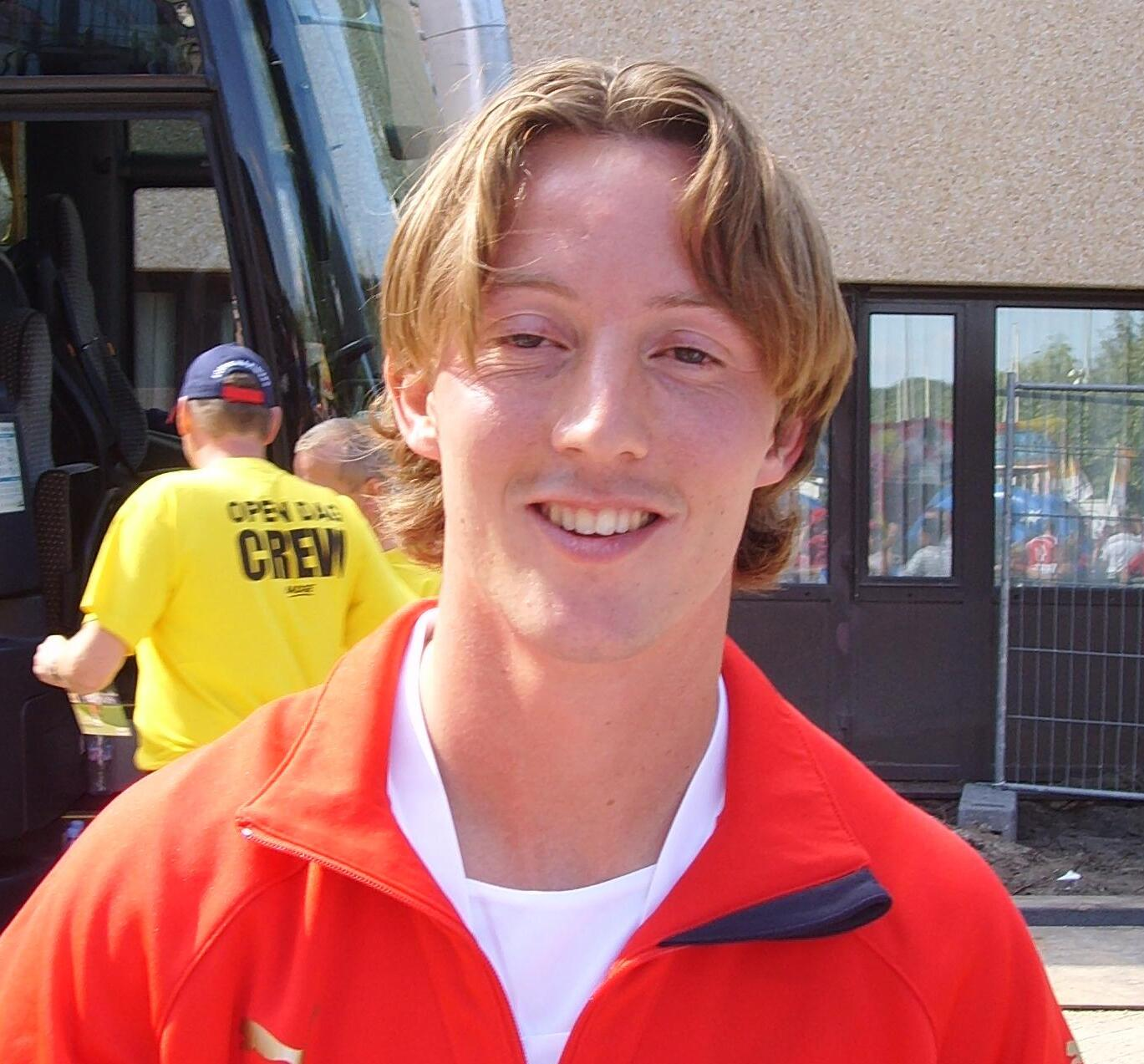
- Van der Gun in 2007

Personal information
- Date of birth: 5 May 1979 (age 47)
- Place of birth: The Hague, Netherlands
- Height: 1.77 m (5 ft 10 in)
- Position: Winger

Youth career
- HVV
- ADO Den Haag
- Ajax

Senior career*
Years	Team	Apps	(Gls)
1999–2003	Ajax	35	(9)
1999–2000	→ Den Bosch (loan)	10	(0)
2002–2003	→ Willem II (loan)	30	(6)
2003–2005	ADO Den Haag	58	(12)
2005–2006	Borussia Dortmund	3	(0)
2006–2009	Utrecht	52	(17)
2009–2011	Swansea City	35	(3)
2012–2014	Utrecht	49	(9)
Total		272	(56)

International career
1996–1997	Netherlands U18	5	(2)
1997–2001	Netherlands U21	12	(2)
- * Club domestic league appearances and goals

Cedric van der Gun (born 5 May 1979) is a Dutch former professional footballer who played as a winger.

== Club career ==
=== Ajax and loan spells ===
Born in The Hague, Van der Gun started his professional football at Ajax when he first joined at fifteen years old. Van der Gun was part of the senior squad of the club in the 1998–99 season, but did not play. He then joined Den Bosch in the 1999–2000 season and made his debut in the Eredivisie.

In the summer of 2000, Van der Gun was brought back to Ajax, where he made the breakthrough, and was given a number twenty shirt. Van der Gun made his debut for the club, coming on as a 76th-minute substitute, in a 5–0 win against Fortuna Sittard in the opening game of the season. Since returning from injury, he found his playing time, coming from the substitute bench. Van der Gun scored his first goal for Ajax in the first leg of the UEFA Cup first round, in a 6–0 win against Genk on 12 September 2000. In the return leg, he scored twice for the club, in a 3–0 win to advance to the next round of the tournament. On 9 November 2000, Van der Gun scored his third goal in the UEFA Cup against Lausanne in the second leg of the tournament second round, as Ajax lost 3–2 on aggregate following a 2–2 draw. Three days later on 12 November 2000, he scored his first league goals for Ajax, in a 4–1 win against De Graafschap A month later on 3 December 2000, Van der Gun scored another brace, in a 6–2 win against SC Heerenveen. He then scored his fifth league goal for the club, in a 3–0 win against Fortuna Sittard on 16 February 2001. Two weeks later, on 4 March 2001, Van der Gun scored sixth league goal for Ajax, in a 3–1 win against RBC Roosendaal. Two weeks later on 18 March 2001, he scored twice and provided a hat–trick assist, in a 9–0 win against Sparta Rotterdam. His performance led to the club keen on extending Van der Gun's contract. On 26 April 2001, he signed a contract with Ajax, keeping him until 2005. In the last game of the season, Van der Gun scored his thirteenth goal of the season, in a 5–1 win against AZ Alkmaar. Despite suffering from injuries, Van der Gun went on to make thirty–six appearances and scoring thirteen times in all competitions.

Van der Gun made his first appearance of the 2001–02 season against Roda JC, starting a match and playing 83 minutes, in a 1–1 draw. However, he suffered a knee injury while training and was sidelined for most of the 2001–02 season. By November, Van der Gun spent the next three months, recovering slowly from his injury, as he began making his return to training. On 28 February 2002, he made his return from injury, coming on as a 76th-minute substitute, in a 1–1 draw against Fortuna Sittard. However, his return was short–lived when Van der Gun suffered ankle injury that saw him out for the rest of the 2001–02 season. At the end of the 2001–02 season, he went on to make two appearances in all competitions.

Ahead of the 2002–03 season, Van der Gun was expected to leave Ajax following a not so satisfactory from last season. He was then loaned to Willem II for the 2002–03 season. Van der Gun made his debut for the club, coming on as a 70th-minute substitute, in a 1–0 loss against Roda JC on 31 August 2002. A month later on 28 September 2002, he scored his first goal for Willem II, in a 5–2 win against FC Zwolle. This was followed up by scoring his second goal for the club, in a 1–1 draw against Heerenveen. On two occasions, he played twice against his parent club, Ajax, on 3 November 2002 and 2 February 2003, as the club lost both matches. Van der Gun then scored three more goals by the end of the year. He then scored his sixth goal for Willem II, in a 3–0 win against FC Zwolle. On 14 April 2003, it was announced that he would be returning to his parent club at the end of the 2002–03 season. Van der Gun became a first team regular for the club, as he went on to make thirty appearances and scoring six times in all competitions.

Ahead of the 2003–04 season, Van der Gun said he will be fighting for his place in the first team for Ajax. However, Van Der Gun was dropped from the first team squad. On 4 September 2003, Van der Gun signed for ADO Den Haag on loan for the 2003–04 season. He made his debut for the club, starting the whole game, in a 1–1 draw against Volendam on 12 September 2003. Van der Gun scored his first goal for ADO Den Haag, in a 4–1 loss against Feyenoord on 7 December 2003. Once again, he played twice against his parent club, Ajax, on two occasions on 9 November 2003 and 1 February 2004. Van der Gun then scored three goals in three matches between 15 February 2004 and 29 February 2004 against Feyenoord, Roda JC and Volendam. He became a first team regular at ADO Den Haag and went on to make twenty–six appearances and scoring six times in all competitions.

Once again, Van der Gun was loaned out to ADO Den Haag for the 2004–05 season. He made his second debut for the club, starting the whole game, in a 1–0 loss against Den Bosch in the opening game of the season. Two weeks later on 29 August 2004, Van der Gun scored his first goal in his second spell at ADO Den Haag, in a 3–1 win against RKC Waalwijk. This was followed up by scoring against his parent club, Ajax, drawing 3–3. He then scored two goals in two matches between 31 October 2004 and 12 November 2004 against Groningen and RBC Roosendaal. Van der Gun later scored two more goals later in the 2004–05 season, coming against Vitesse and Feyenoord. Once again becoming a first team regular at the club, he went on to make thirty–three appearances and scoring six times in all competitions. It was announced on 31 March 2005 that Ajax would not be renewing Van der Gun's contract at the end of the 2004–05 season.

=== Borussia Dortmund ===
On 22 August 2005, Van der Gun was signed by Borussia Dortmund on a one–year contract, after impressing the club on trial and turning down a permanent move to join ADO Den Haag.

His first game for Dortmund was for the reserve team against Gütersloh on 24 August 2005 and he was on the wings with David Odonkor, Salvatore Gambino and Delron Buckley. Van der Gun made his Bundesliga debut for the club on match day three against Duisburg on 28 August 2005, starting a match before former Dortmund coach Bert van Marwijk replaced him in the 62nd minute for Ebi Smolarek, in a 1–1 draw. On 11 September 2005, the following matchday, he suffered in the match against the 1. FC Köln a torn ACL and was out for months. This injury threw him far behind. On 6 May 2006, Van der Gun made his return from injury in the last game of the season against Bayern Munich. At the end of the 2005–06 season, he went on to make three appearances in all competitions. However, Van der Gun was released by the club after deciding against renewing his expiring contract. Since leaving Borussia Dortmund, he was called "the unluckiest player to play for the club" by Goal.com, due to injuries.

=== Utrecht (first spell) ===
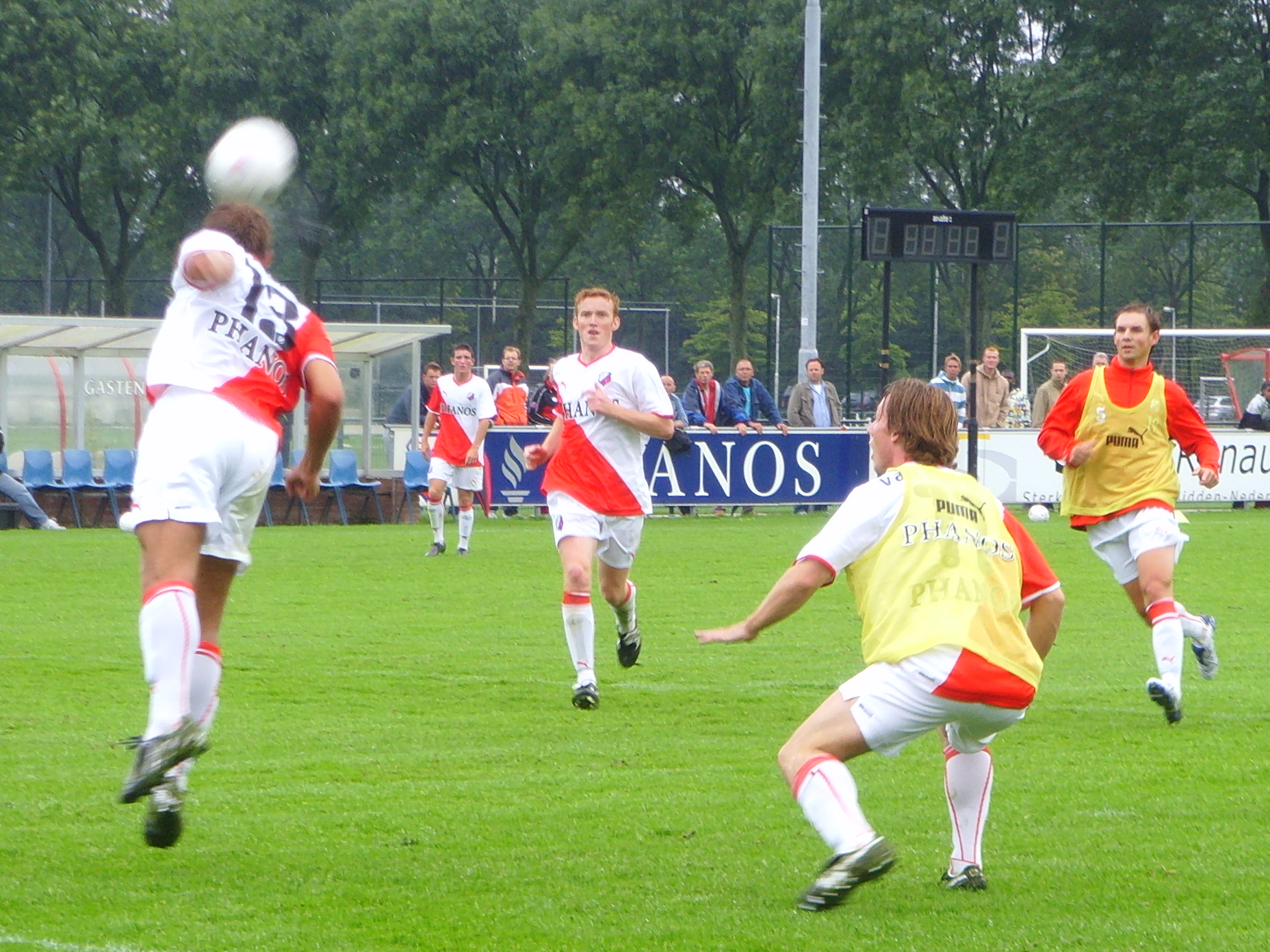
Van der Gun training during his time at FC Utrecht in 2008.

After a season with injury problems at the German side, Van der Gun returned to the Netherlands for Utrecht, signing a three–year contract with the club.

He made his debut for Utrecht, starting the whole game, in a 2–1 loss against Willem II in the opening game of the season. Since joining the club, Van der Gun quickly established himself in the first team, becoming FC Utrecht's first choice striker. He scored his first goal for the club, in a 1–0 win against Excelsior on 15 October 2006. This was followed up by scoring his second goal for FC Utrecht, in a 2–0 win against ADO Den Haag. Van der Gun then scored twice for the club, in a 3–0 win against Groningen on 3 December 2006. However, he suffered a torn cruciate ligament in the right knee while warming up prior to a match against NEC on 9 December 2006 and was sidelined for three months. On 9 March 2007, Van der Gun made his return from injury, coming on as a 72nd-minute substitute, in a 0–0 draw against Roda JC. However, his return was short–lived when he suffered a knee injury while training and was sidelined for the rest of the 2006–07 season. As a result, Van der Gun was sidelined for six months. At the end of the 2006–07 season, he went on to make eighteen appearances and scoring four times in all competitions.

The first half of the 2007–08 season saw Van der Gun continuing to remain on the sidelines, as he recovered from his knee injury. Van der Gun made his return from injury, playing for Jong Utrecht and scored in a 3–3 draw against Jong Vitesse on 11 December 2007. On 13 January 2008, he made his first team return, coming on as a second half substitute, in a 2–2 draw against Heerenveen. Three weeks later on 3 February 2008, Van der Gun scored his first goal of the season, in a 2–0 win against Willem II. A month later on 16 March 2008, he scored his second goal of the season, in a 2–2 draw against AZ Alkmaar. His third goal of the season came on 13 April 2008, in a 2–2 draw against De Graafschap. Van der Gun played in both legs of the play–offs round against Groningen, as the club lost 5–3 on aggregate. Despite missing two matches later in the 2007–08 season, he went on to make fifteen appearances and scoring two times in all competitions.

At the start of the 2008–09 season, Van der Gun was sidelined for four months when he suffered a heel injury. By late–October, Van Der Gun made a recovery from his injury and returned to training. He made his first appearance of the season against Heracles Almelo on 2 November 2008, coming on as a second half substitute, and scoring his first goal of the season, in a 2–0 win. Since returning from injury, Van der Gun regained his first team place, starting out as Utrecht's first choice striker. He then scored three more goals by the end of the year, coming against Vitesse, NEC and Roda JC. His fifth goal of the season came on 25 January 2009 against Sparta Rotterdam, as well as, Utrecht's first goal of the game, in a 3–3 draw. A week later on 4 February 2009, Van der Gun scored a hat–trick for the club, as they won 3–0 against De Graafschap. He scored his ninth goal of the season, as well as, setting up the first goal of the game, in a 2–0 win against Willem II on 13 February 2009. However, Van der Gun suffered a hamstring injury and was substituted in the 80th minute, as Utrecht drew 0–0 against Roda JC on 8 March 2009. After the match, it was announced that he would be sidelined for a month. On 24 April 2009, Van der Gun made his return to the starting line–up against Vitesse and played the whole game, as the club lost 6–1. In the last game of the season, he scored his tenth goal of the season, in a 1–1 draw against Heracles Almelo. Van der Gun played both legs of the play–offs round against Groningen, as Utrecht lost 7–3 on aggregate. At the end of the 2008–09 season, he was able to put his skills to the test when he scored ten goals in twenty–three matches in all competitions.

It was announced on 4 March 2009 that Van der Gun would be leaving Utrecht and was keen on playing abroad.

=== Swansea City ===
On 10 September 2009, Van der Gun signed a one-year contract with Swansea City with a 12-month extension option. This was his first period in the United Kingdom. Manager Paulo Sousa said: "I am delighted to bring Cedric in. He is a player with a lot of experience, who likes to take on players and has very good technique. He is a good finisher as well and I expect his quality to help the team improve as an attacking unit. I hope he will score some goals too and help us win games. He knows Swansea well and he knows the football we play here, which is good. The fact he wanted to play in England really did help us seal the deal."

Van der Gun made his debut for the club, coming on as a 62nd-minute substitute, in a 2–0 loss against Preston North End on 12 September 2009. In a follow–up match against Bristol City, he made his first start for Swansea City, as the club drew 0–0. However, Van der Gun missed four matches, due to a thigh injury. On 20 October 2009, he made his return from injury, starting the whole game, in a 1–0 win against West Bromwich Albion. Having struggled to score goals since joining Swansea, Van der Gun finally scored his first goal for the club against Scunthorpe United on 31 October 2009. Following his return from injury, he became a first team regular for Swansea, playing in the left–wing position. However in January, Van der Gun suffered a thigh injury that kept him out for two months. On 7 March 2010, he made his return from injury, coming on as a second half substitute, in a 1–0 loss against Nottingham Forest. Following his return from injury, Van der Gun continued to remain involved in the first team for the rest of the 2009–10 season. He then scored his second goal of the season, in a 5–1 loss against Blackpool on 23 March 2010. At the end of the 2009–10 season, Van der Gun went on to make twenty–six appearances and scoring two times in all competitions. Following this, Swansea opted to trigger his contract to stay for another season.

In the 2010–11 season, Van der Gun found his first team opportunities limited and found himself placed on the substitute bench. As a result, manager Brendan Rodgers expected the player to leave Swansea, but ended up staying at the club. Despite this, he was able to add three goals in the first two months to the season, scoring against Barnet, Tranmere Rovers and Nottingham Forest. Van der Gun added two more goals in the FA Cup matches against Colchester United and Leyton Orient. Having made sixteen appearances and scoring five times in all competitions, he was released by Swansea at the end of the 2010–11 season, following their promotion to the Premier League.

=== Utrecht (second spell) ===
After seven months without a club, on 31 January 2012, Van der Gun re-joined his former club Utrecht until the end of the season. Upon re–joining the club, he said: "I know Utrecht and the player well and I have previously trained under Jan Wouters at the start of my career. I also know Foeke Booy well, under him I went through one of my best periods of my career. I am looking forward to it in order to take my experience with the club up the road. I am eager and I think I can add value. Utrecht can expect something from me."

However, Van der Gun missed three matches since joining the club, due to a muscle injury. He made his second debut for Utrecht, coming on as a 73rd-minute substitute, in a 1–1 draw against ADO Den Haag on 12 February 2012. However, Van der Gun missed two matches due to injury. He returned to the starting line–up against Feyenoord on 11 March 2012, and scored his first goal for the club in three years, in a 1–1 draw. This was followed up by scoring in the next two matches against Groningen and Heracles Almelo. Following this, Van der Gun remained in the first team in the remaining matches of the 2011–12 season. At the end of the 2011–12 season, he went on to make twelve appearances and scoring three times in all competitions. Following this, Van der Gun signed a contract extension with the club.

At the start of the 2012–13 season, Van der Gun continued to be in the first team, becoming Utrecht's first choice striker. After coming on as a substitute in the opening game of the season, in a 1–1 draw against Feyenoord, he scored on his first start of the season, in a 3–1 win against VVV-Venlo on 18 August 2012. Van der Gun then scored his second goal of the season, in a 5–1 win against Willem II on 3 November 2012. However, he suffered a knee injury that saw him out for six weeks. On 20 January 2013, Van der Gun made his return from injury, starting a match and playing 79 minutes, in a 2–0 win against Groningen. Following his return from injury, he was involved in the first team for the next ten matches. Van der Gun then scored his second goal of the season, in a 2–1 loss against Feyenoord on 17 March 2013. However, he missed three matches, due to a knee injury. After months of negotiations, Van der Gun signed a contract extension with the club, with a reduced salary. He then made his return from injury, starting a match against Heerenveen on 5 May 2013, and played 61 minutes, before being substituted, in a 4–2 win. In a follow–up match, Van der Gun scored his third goal of the season, in a 3–0 win against Heracles Almelo in the last game of the season. He scored against SC Heerenveen in the first leg of the semi–final play–offs spot for the UEFA Europa League next season, in a 1–0 win. After helping Utrecht progress through the next round, Van der Gun scored in the first leg of the final play–offs spot against Twente, in a 2–0 win. In the return leg, he captained the whole game, as Utrecht went on to lose 2–1, though the club won 3–2 on aggregate, thereby qualifying for the UEFA Europa League. At the end of the 2012–13 season, Van der Gun went on to make twenty–nine appearances and scoring six times in all competitions.

Ahead of the 2013–14 season, Utrecht announced that Van der Gun was appointed as the new captain. At the start of the 2013–14 season, he played in both legs of the UEFA Europa League second round match against Dufferdange, as Utrecht lost 5–4 on aggregate, eliminating the club from the tournament. However, Van der Gun suffered a knee injury that saw him out for two months. But he made his return to the first team from injury, coming on as a 59th-minute substitute, in a 1–0 loss against Feyenoord on 22 September 2013. Van der Gun captained his first match of the season against Roda JC on 28 September 2013, and scored his first goal of the season, in a 3–2 win. However, he suffered a knee injury while training and was sidelined for three months. On 8 March 2014, Van der Gun made his return from injury, coming on as a 62nd-minute substitute, in a 1–0 loss against PSV Eindhoven. Three weeks later on 28 March 2014, he scored his second goal of the season, in a 2–2 draw against NAC Breda. His return was short–lived when Van der Gun suffered a shoulder injury and was substituted in the 36th minute, as Utrecht won 2–1 on 13 April 2014. After the match, it was announced that he would be out for the rest of the 2013–14 season. At the end of the 2013–14 season, Van der Gun went on to make seventeen appearances and scoring two times in all competitions.

On 30 April 2014, it was announced that Van der Gun would be leaving Utrecht at the end of the season. Having been a free agent for months, he retired from professional football.

== International career ==
Van der Gun represented the youth levels of Netherlands. In August 2000, he was called up to the Netherlands U21 squad for the first time. Van der Gun scored on his U21 national team debut, in a 2–0 win against Republic of Ireland on 1 September 2000. He then scored his second goal for Netherlands U21, in a 4–2 win against Cyprus U21 on 24 April 2001. Van der Gun went on to make five appearances and scoring two times for the U21 national team.

== Post-playing career ==
Following his retirement from professional football, Van der Gun, along with John Heitinga, were added to Ajax's backroom staff and was appointed as the club's trainer. He previously worked as a youth trainer at ADO Den Haag.
