= André Bergdølmo =

Norwegian footballer (born 1971)

Personal information
- Full name: André Bergdølmo
- Date of birth: 13 October 1971 (age 55)
- Place of birth: Oslo, Norway
- Height: 1.87 m (6 ft 2 in)
- Position: Defender

Youth career
- –1990: Skjetten

Senior career*
Years	Team	Apps	(Gls)
1991–1996	Lillestrøm	119	(9)
1997–2000	Rosenborg	83	(3)
2000–2003	Ajax	69	(6)
2003–2005	Borussia Dortmund	28	(0)
2005–2007	Copenhagen	33	(3)
2007–2008	Strømsgodset	43	(7)
Total		403	(36)

International career
1997–2005	Norway	63	(0)

Managerial career
- 2009–2010: Lillestrøm (assistant)
- 2010–2011: Lillestrøm (junior)
- 2012: Vålerenga (developer)
- 2013: Drøbak-Frogn
- 2014: Kongsvinger
- 2016: Ull/Kisa (assistant)
- * Club domestic league appearances and goals

André Bergdølmo (born 13 October 1971) is a Norwegian former football defender. He was capable of playing in all defensive positions on the field, and while most often taking up a position on the left side, his favourite was that of right full back.

Bergdølmo began his senior career at Lillestrøm in 1991, before transferring to Rosenborg for a fee of 700,000 kr ahead of the 1997 season. From there, he went on to play for clubs in the Netherlands, Germany and Denmark, over a period of seven years from 2000 to 2007. He then returned to Norway, spending the final two years of his career at Strømsgodset. Upon retiring at the end of the 2008 season, Bergdølmo had won the League Championship seven times with three clubs, and earned 63 caps for the Norway national football team.

== Club career ==
Bergdølmo started his playing career in Skjetten, and went from there to Lillestrøm in 1991, where he gradually became known as one of the best defenders in Norway. After six seasons at Åråsen, he went to Norwegian champion team Rosenborg in the spring of 1997. This move was controversial, and Bergdølmo fell out of favour with the Lillestrøm fans. The same year he made his national team debut.

Bergdølmo won four league titles with Rosenborg, and was ever-present for Norway at the Euro 2000. After the European Championships, he was bought by Dutch giants Ajax. Used as a central defender, he helped to win the Dutch league title in 2002. In the summer of 2003, he moved on to German team Borussia Dortmund, where he played for two seasons, before signing with Copenhagen in the summer of 2005. He made his debut for Copenhagen in a match against Nordsjælland on 31 July 2005, and his last match for the club was an UEFA Champions League match in Group F against Scottish Celtic on 26 September 2006. He reached 53 appearances for Copenhagen, scoring five goals, four of which on penalty.

He moved to Strømsgodset on 15 March 2007, where he signed a two-year contract. He retired at the end of the 2008 season, but would continue playing sporadically for Sørum on the eighth tier of Norwegian football.

== International career ==
Bergdølmo made his debut for Norway on 18 January 1997, and was a regular since the late nineties. He played his last match on 12 November 2005, and amassed 63 caps in total.

== Managerial career ==
After coaching the U20 team of Lillestrøm SK, Bergdølmo became player developer for their rivals Vålerenga in 2012. He was asked to find a new club in January 2013. Bergdølmo was subsequently announced as the new manager of Drøbak-Frogn IL in early 2013. He was bought by Kongsvinger IL in 2014. He was sacked in the late summer. Ahead of the 2016 season he joined Ull/Kisa as assistant manager to Vegard Skogheim.

== Honours ==
Rosenborg

- Tippeligaen: 1997, 1998, 1999, 2000

Ajax

- Eredivisie: 2001–02
- KNVB Cup: 2001–02
- Johan Cruyff Shield: 2002

Copenhagen

- Superliga: 2005–06
- Royal League: 2004–05, 2005–06

Individual

- Kniksen of the Year: 2002
