= Wamberto =

Brazilian footballer (born 1974)

Personal information
- Full name: Wamberto de Jesus Sousa Campos
- Date of birth: 14 December 1974 (age 51)
- Place of birth: Cururupu, Brazil
- Height: 1.68 m (5 ft 6 in)
- Positions: Forward; midfielder

Youth career
- São Luís
- –1991: Sampaio Corrêa
- 1991–1993: Seraing

Senior career*
Years	Team	Apps	(Gls)
1993–1996	Seraing	86	(14)
1996–1998	Standard Liège	53	(10)
1998–2004	Ajax	122	(26)
2004	→ Mons (loan)	17	(5)
2004–2006	Standard Liège	28	(1)
2006–2007	Mons	20	(2)
2007–2008	Omniworld	16	(3)
2009–2010	KFCO Wilrijk	7	(5)
2010–2011	Berlaar-Heikant		
- * Club domestic league appearances and goals

Wamberto de Jesus Sousa Campos (born 14 December 1974) is a Brazilian former professional footballer who played as a forward and as a midfielder. He notably represented Ajax and Standard Liége.

He was also nicknamed Wampie by Ajax supporters.

== Career ==
Wamberto played for Seraing and Standard Liège in Belgium and Ajax in Netherlands. The tricky and illusive player established himself in Belgium between 1993 and 1998, before joining Ajax in August 1998. He is famously remembered for scoring the equaliser in offside position against Utrecht in the 2002 Dutch Cup final, which was won by Ajax in the extra time. In January 2004, he was loaned to Belgian club Mons for 18 months who also retained the first option to buy him. But Mons failed to protect their place in top division, and Wamberto joined Standard Liège in the summer of 2004 on a two-year contract, but he rejoined the newly promoted Mons on a free transfer in summer 2006. He was released after a year, and returned to the Netherlands, joining Omniworld.

== Personal life ==
His eldest son Damilo is also a former professional footballer, having played for Standard Liège and Metalurh Donetsk, ending his career in Cyprus, after a formative period in the Ajax academy. His younger son Wanderson is also a footballer currently playing for Internacional.
