= John O'Brien (soccer) =

American soccer player

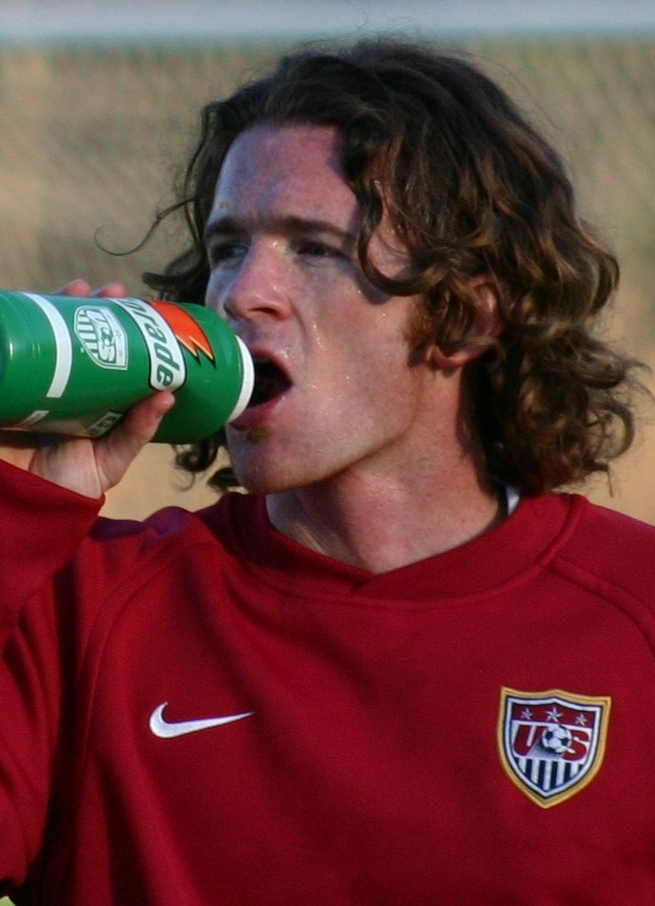
- O'Brien in 2006

Personal information
- Full name: Jonathan Patrick O'Brien
- Date of birth: August 29, 1977 (age 49)
- Place of birth: Los Angeles, California, U.S.
- Height: 5 ft 8 in (1.73 m)
- Positions: Midfielder; left-back

Youth career
- 1994–1998: Ajax

Senior career*
Years	Team	Apps	(Gls)
1998–2005	Ajax	63	(3)
1998–1999	→ Utrecht (loan)	19	(2)
2005–2006	ADO Den Haag	3	(0)
2006	Chivas USA	1	(0)
Total		86	(5)

International career
1998–2006	United States	32	(3)
Medal record
Representing United States
Winner	CONCACAF Gold Cup	2005
Men's Soccer
- * Club domestic league appearances and goals

Jonathan Patrick O'Brien (born August 29, 1977) is an American former soccer player. After retiring, he pursued a career in psychology.

O'Brien was one of the first Americans to earn a starting spot with a major European team, with Ajax Amsterdam in the late 1990s. (Note: O'Brien was the second American ever to play for the 1st team of Ajax, the first being Eddy Hamel who played for the club from 1922 to 1930.) At the peak of his career, United States national teammate Landon Donovan called O'Brien the "best soccer player in the USA."

== Club career ==
O'Brien grew up in Playa del Rey, California and attended Brentwood School. After being brought to attention of youth director Co Adriaanse, he had his first trial with Ajax at the age of 14 and signed an amateur contract with the Dutch giants in 1994 as a 17-year-old. After two years on their youth teams, Ajax offered O'Brien a professional contract in 1998. He spent the 1998–99 season on loan to FC Utrecht and made his Ajax debut in 1999. He became a regular for the team, usually playing at left back, winning the Eredivisie in 2002 and 2004.

Unfortunately, chronic injuries limited O'Brien's playing time. He left Ajax for ADO Den Haag in February 2005. After one injury-riddled season, in which he only played three games for the club, O'Brien came to MLS for the first time, to sign with hometown club Chivas USA. O'Brien played only one game with Chivas before suffering an injury with the U.S. national team during the 2006 World Cup, and was released by the club following the 2006 season.

O'Brien stated that he was done playing in an interview on June 11, 2008.

== International career ==
With the United States, O'Brien earned his first cap against Austria on April 22, 1998, but was an alternate for the U.S. squad for the 1998 FIFA World Cup. He played in the 2000 Summer Olympics, helping to lead the U.S. to a fourth-place finish. O'Brien became a regular with the senior team under Bruce Arena, and came into his own at the 2002 FIFA World Cup. Playing in defensive midfield, he scored the opener in the 3–2 win over Portugal, assisted on Clint Mathis' goal against South Korea, and played every minute of every game for the United States.

Four years later, O'Brien was named to the U.S. roster for the 2006 FIFA World Cup in Germany. On June 12, 2006, he played the second half of the U.S.'s opening game against the Czech Republic, albeit with a nagging injury, which kept him out for the duration of the tournament.

== Personal life ==
O’Brien lives with his wife, son, and daughter near Boulder, Colorado. After retiring from soccer, O’Brien returned to college and completed a doctorate in clinical psychology from Alliant International University. O’Brien has two separate practices, one providing mental health counseling to the general public and one working as a sports psychologist.

== Career statistics ==
=== Club ===
Appearances and goals by club, season and competition
Club	Season	League			National cup (Note: Includes KNVB Cup, U.S. Open Cup)		Continental		Other		Total	
Club	Season	Division	Apps	Goals	Apps	Goals	Apps	Goals	Apps	Goals	Apps	Goals
Utrecht	1998–99	Eredivisie	19	2	0	0	–		–		19	2
Ajax	1999–2000	Eredivisie	15	1	1	0	4	0	0 (Note: Appearance in Johan Cruijff Shield)	0	20	1
Ajax	2000–01	Eredivisie	4	0	0	0	0	0	–		4	0
Ajax	2001–02	Eredivisie	27	2	4	0	3	0	–		34	2
Ajax	2002–03	Eredivisie	12	0	2	0	5	0	1	0	20	0
Ajax	2003–04	Eredivisie	4	0	0	0	0	0	–		4	0
Ajax	2004–05	Eredivisie	1	0	0	0	0	0	0	0	1	0
Ajax	Total		63	3	7	0	12	0	1	0	83	3
ADO Den Haag	2005–06	Eredivisie	3	0	1	0	–		–		4	0
Chivas USA	2006	Major League Soccer	1	0	0	0	–		–		1	0
Career total			86	5	8	0	12	0	1	0	107	5

=== International ===
Appearances and goals by national team and year
National team	Year	Apps	Goals
United States	1998	1	0
United States	1999	0	0
United States	2000	5	1
United States	2001	5	0
United States	2002	9	1
United States	2003	1	0
United States	2004	0	0
United States	2005	7	1
United States	2006	4	0
Total		32	3

Scores and results list the United States' goal tally first, score column indicates score after each O'Brien goal.

List of international goals scored by John O'Brien
No.	Date	Venue	Opponent	Score	Result	Competition
1	August 16, 2000	Foxborough, Massachusetts, United States	Barbados	4–0	7–0	2002 World Cup qualification
2	June 5, 2002	Suwon, South Korea	Portugal	1–0	3–2	2002 FIFA World Cup
3	July 21, 2005	East Rutherford, New Jersey, United States	Honduras	1–1	2–1	2005 CONCACAF Gold Cup

== Honors ==
Ajax

- Eredivisie: 2001–02, 2003–04
- KNVB Cup: 2002
- Johan Cruyff Shield: 2002

United States

- CONCACAF Gold Cup: 2005

Individual

- CONCACAF Gold Cup Best XI (Honorable Mention): 2005
