= Tomáš Galásek =

Czech footballer and manager

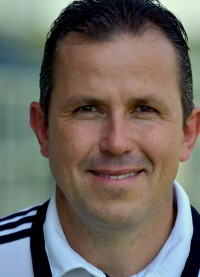
- Galásek in 2016

Personal information
- Full name: Tomáš Galásek
- Date of birth: 15 January 1973 (age 53)
- Place of birth: Frýdek-Místek, Czechoslovakia (now Czech Republic)
- Height: 1.80 m (5 ft 11 in)
- Position: Midfielder

Youth career
- 1979–1991: Baník Ostrava

Senior career*
Years	Team	Apps	(Gls)
1991–1996	Baník Ostrava	121	(9)
1996–2000	Willem II	110	(11)
2000–2006	Ajax	154	(24)
2006–2008	1. FC Nürnberg	63	(4)
2008	Banik Ostrava	14	(0)
2009	Borussia Mönchengladbach	15	(0)
2009–2011	FSV Erlangen-Bruck	23	(2)
Total		500	(50)

International career
1994–1996	Czech Republic U21	15	(6)
1995–2008	Czech Republic	69	(1)

Managerial career
- 2015–2016: SpVgg SV Weiden
- 2022: Baník Ostrava (caretaker)
- 2025–2026: Baník Ostrava
Medal record
Men's football
Representing Czech Republic
UEFA European Championship
Bronze medal – third place	2004 Portugal
- * Club domestic league appearances and goals

Tomáš Galásek (Czech pronunciation: [ˈtomaːʃ ˈɡalaːsɛk]; born 15 January 1973) is a Czech football manager and former player. A midfielder, he is the only player to have witnessed both silver goals ever scored in European football, scoring the first for Ajax.

== Club career ==
Galásek started his career with Banik Ostrava, where he was part of the starting line-up for more than four seasons, before moving to Dutch side Willem II Tilburg in 1996 for a fee of 50 million Czech koruna. With Willem II, he reached an historic fifth place in Eredivisie, which meant UEFA Cup qualification for the first time in 30 years. Since then, he played four UEFA Cup matches. In 1998–99, Willem II exceeded the previous year's performance, finishing second in the league. For the first time in history, Willem II qualified for the UEFA Champions League. In that competition, Galásek played five matches for Willem II.

Galásek moved to Ajax in the summer of 2000. With Ajax, he won the national championship twice and the national cup once and played 26 times in the Champions League.

From 2006, he played for 1. FC Nürnberg in the Bundesliga, after signing a two-year deal with German club. On 15 August 2008, he returned to Banik Ostrava. On 19 December, he signed a contract with Borussia Mönchengladbach. In July 2009, he retired from professional football but made a comeback in the Bayernliga on 31 August 2009 when he signed for FSV Erlangen-Bruck.

== International career ==
Galásek made his debut for the Czech Republic in 1995 and was part of the team that reached the semifinals of Euro 2004. He took part in the 2006 FIFA World Cup as captain of the Czech team.

In June 2008, after a loss to Turkey at UEFA Euro 2008, he left the national team and ended his international career. He made 69 appearances scoring once.

== Managerial career ==
In the season of 2011–12, Galásek trained the U15 team in FSV Erlangen-Bruck, where his son played. The following year, he was the assistant manager of the Czech national team. In the 2013–14 season, he was assistant manager of 1. FC Schweinfurt 05. In the summer of 2015, he became the head coach of SpVgg SV Weiden, remaining in his position until 2016.

He worked at Baník Ostrava as assistant coach in the 2021–22 season under head coach Ondřej Smetana. After Smetana's departure, he concluded the season as interim head coach. On 12 October 2025, Galásek was appointed as manager of Baník Ostrava. On 16 February 2026, after only four months, Galásek was replaced by Ondřej Smetana.

== Personal life ==
Galásek was born on 15 January 1973 in Frýdek-Místek to Czech parents. In 1994, he married his wife Sylvie. Together, they have two children Denisa and Tom. In 2012, he was living with his family in the suburbs of Nuremberg, Germany.

== Career statistics ==
=== Club ===
Appearances and goals by club, season and competition
Club	Season	League		
Club	Season	Division	Apps	Goals
Baník Ostrava	1991–92	First League	10	0
Baník Ostrava	1992–93	First League	30	1
Baník Ostrava	1993–94	First League	30	0
Baník Ostrava	1994–95	First League	25	3
Baník Ostrava	1995–96	First League	26	5
Baník Ostrava	Total		121	9
Willem II	1996–97	Eredivisie	16	0
Willem II	1997–98	Eredivisie	31	3
Willem II	1998–99	Eredivisie	32	5
Willem II	1999–00	Eredivisie	31	3
Willem II	Total		110	11
Ajax	2000–01	Eredivisie	33	8
Ajax	2001–02	Eredivisie	23	1
Ajax	2002–03	Eredivisie	30	5
Ajax	2003–04	Eredivisie	29	4
Ajax	2004–05	Eredivisie	13	2
Ajax	2005–06	Eredivisie	26	4
Ajax	Total		154	24
1. FC Nürnberg	2006–07	Bundesliga	32	2
1. FC Nürnberg	2007–08	Bundesliga	31	2
1. FC Nürnberg	Total		63	4
Baník Ostrava	2008–09	First League	14	0
Borussia Mönchengladbach	2008–09	Bundesliga	15	0
FSV Erlangen-Bruck	2009–10	Bayernliga	16	1
FSV Erlangen-Bruck	2010–11	Bayernliga	7	1
FSV Erlangen-Bruck	Total		23	2
Career total			500	50

=== International ===
Appearances and goals by national team and year
National team	Year	Apps	Goals
Czech Republic	1995	2	0
Czech Republic	1996	0	0
Czech Republic	1997	0	0
Czech Republic	1998	5	0
Czech Republic	1999	4	0
Czech Republic	2000	0	0
Czech Republic	2001	2	0
Czech Republic	2002	8	0
Czech Republic	2003	7	0
Czech Republic	2004	14	0
Czech Republic	2005	7	1
Czech Republic	2006	5	0
Czech Republic	2007	6	0
Czech Republic	2008	9	0
Total		69	1

== Honours ==
Ajax

- Eredivisie: 2001–02, 2003–04
- KNVB Cup: 2001–02, 2005–06
- Dutch Super Cup: 2002, 2005

1. FC Nürnberg

- DFB-Pokal: 2006–07
