= 1993–94 AFC Ajax season =

Ajax
1993–94 season
- Chairman: Michael van Praag
- Manager: Louis van Gaal
- Stadium: De Meer Stadion; Olympisch Stadion (selected matches)
- Eredivisie: Winners
- KNVB Cup: Semi-finals
- European Cup Winners' Cup: Quarter-finals
- Dutch Supercup: Winners
- Top goalscorer: League: Jari Litmanen (26); All: Jari Litmanen (34)
- Highest home attendance: 48,000
- Average home league attendance: 23,331
Home colours	Away colours

During the 1993–94 Dutch football season, Ajax competed in the Eredivisie. During that season, they won their 24th league title, as well as the Johan Cruyff Shield. They also competed in both that years KNVB Cup and European Cup Winners' Cup.

== Squad ==
Squad at the start of season

Note: Flags indicate national team as defined under FIFA eligibility rules; some limited exceptions apply. Players may hold more than one non-FIFA nationality.

No.	Pos.	Nation	Player
—	GK	NED	Edwin van der Sar
—	GK	NED	Stanley Menzo
—	DF	NED	Sonny Silooy
—	DF	NED	Frank de Boer
—	DF	NED	Danny Blind (captain)
—	DF	NED	Dick van Burik
—	MF	NED	Frank Rijkaard
—	MF	FIN	Jari Litmanen
—	MF	NED	Ronald de Boer
—	MF	NED	John van den Brom
—	MF	NED	Clarence Seedorf
—	MF	NED	Edgar Davids

No.	Pos.	Nation	Player
—	MF	NED	Michel Kreek
—	MF	NED	Tarik Oulida
—	MF	NED	Rob Alflen
—	MF	NED	Martijn Reuser
—	MF	NED	Ignacio Tuhuteru
—	FW	NGR	Nwankwo Kanu
—	FW	NED	Marc Overmars
—	FW	NGR	Finidi George
—	FW	SWE	Stefan Pettersson
—	FW	NED	Peter van Vossen
—	FW	DEN	Dan Petersen
—	FW	NED	Donny Huijsen

== Club ==
=== Coaching staff ===
Position	Staff
Manager	(Netherlands) Louis van Gaal
Assistant manager	(Netherlands) Bobby Haarms
Assistant manager	(Netherlands) Gerard van der Lem
Goalkeeping coach	(Netherlands) Frans Hoek
Fitness coach	(Hungary) László Jámbor
Fitness coach	(Netherlands) René Wormhoudt
Physiotherapist	(Netherlands) Pim van Dord

=== Other information ===
Position	Staff
Chairman	(Netherlands) Michael van Praag
Treasurer	(Netherlands) Arie van Os
Press officer	(Netherlands) David Endt

== Transfers ==
=== In ===
Position	Player	From	Type	Fee	Date	Ref.
FW	(Netherlands) Peter van Vossen	(Belgium) Anderlecht	Transfer	€4.55M	1 July 1993	
MF	(Netherlands) John van den Brom	(Netherlands) Vitesse	Transfer	€1.36M	1 July 1993	
MF	(Netherlands) Frank Rijkaard	(Italy) Milan	Transfer	€636.4K	1 July 1993	
FW	(Nigeria) Nwankwo Kanu	(Nigeria) Iwuanyanwu Nationale	Transfer	€200K	1 July 1993	
FW	(Nigeria) Finidi George	(Nigeria) Sharks	Transfer	€4.3K	1 July 1993	
FW	(Netherlands) Donny Huijsen	(Netherlands) DWS	Transfer		1 July 1993	
MF	(Norway) Hans Erik Ramberg	(Norway) Fredrikstad	Transfer		1 July 1993	
GK	(Netherlands) Peter van der Kwaak	(Netherlands) Stormvogels	Transfer		1 July 1993	
MF	(Netherlands) Martijn Reuser	(Netherlands) Jong Ajax	Transfer	Free	1 July 1993	
MF	(Netherlands) Tarik Oulida	(Netherlands) Jong Ajax	Transfer	Free	1 July 1993	
DF	(Netherlands) André Ooijer	(Netherlands) Jong Ajax	Transfer	Free	1 July 1993	

=== Out ===
Position	Player	To	Type	Fee	Date	Ref.
FW	(Netherlands) Dennis Bergkamp	(Italy) Inter Milan	Transfer	€9.77M	1 July 1993	
MF	(Netherlands) Wim Jonk	(Italy) Inter Milan	Transfer	€5.68M	1 July 1993	
MF	(Netherlands) Marciano Vink	(Italy) Genoa	Transfer	€5.00M	1 July 1993	
MF	(Netherlands) Alfons Groenendijk	(England) Manchester City	Transfer	€341K	1 July 1993	
MF	(Netherlands) Dick van Burik	(Netherlands) NAC	Transfer	€300K	1 July 1993	
MF	(Netherlands) Hans Werdekker	(Netherlands) RKC Waalwijk	Transfer		1 July 1993	
MF	(Denmark) Johnny Hansen	(Denmark) Odense BK	Transfer		1 January 1994	

=== Loaned out ===
Position	Player	To	Type	Fee	Start	End	Ref.
GK	(Netherlands) Dennis van de Poll	(Netherlands) FC Den Bosch	Loan transfer		1 July 1993	1 June 1994	
DF	(Netherlands) Michael Reiziger	(Netherlands) Groningen	Loan transfer		1 August 1993	30 June 1994	
FW	(Netherlands) Donny Huijsen	(Netherlands) Go Ahead Eagles	Loan transfer		17 February 1994	30 June 1994	
FW	(Netherlands) Clyde Wijnhard	(Netherlands) Groningen	Loan transfer		1 July 1993	1 May 1994	

== Competitions ==
Competition	First match	Last match	Starting round	Final position	Record							
Competition	First match	Last match	Starting round	Final position	Pld	W	D	L	GF	GA	GD	Win %
Eredivisie	15 August 1993	8 May 1994	Matchday 1	Winners	34	26	2	6	86	26	+60	76.47
KNVB Cup	10 November 1993	20 March 1994	Third Round	Semi-finals	4	3	0	1	20	7	+13	75.00
European Cup Winners' Cup	17 September 1993	16 March 1994	First Round	Quarter-finals	6	3	1	2	12	4	+8	50.00
Dutch Supercup	8 August 1993		Final	Winners	1	1	0	0	4	0	+4	100.00
Total					45	33	3	9	122	37	+85	73.33

Source: Competitions

=== Dutch Supercup ===
8 August 1993 Final	Feyenoord	0–4	Ajax	Rotterdam
CEST (UTC+2)	Heus (yellow card)	Report	Litmanen 18', 62'; F. de Boer 47'; Overmars 61'	Stadium: De Kuip; Attendance: 28,750; Referee: John Blankenstein

=== Eredivisie ===
==== League table ====
Pos	Team	Pld	W	D	L	GF	GA	GD	Pts	Qualification or relegation
1	Ajax (C)	34	26	2	6	86	26	+60	54	Qualification to Champions League group stage
2	Feyenoord (Note: Winners of the KNVB Cup)	34	19	13	2	61	27	+34	51	Qualification to Cup Winners' Cup first round
3	PSV	34	17	10	7	60	36	+24	44	Qualification to UEFA Cup first round
4	Vitesse Arnhem	34	17	6	11	63	37	+26	40	Qualification to UEFA Cup first round
5	FC Twente	34	15	9	10	57	43	+14	39	Qualification to UEFA Cup first round

(C) Champions

==== Results summary ====
Overall								Home						Away					
Pld	W	D	L	GF	GA	GD	Pts	W	D	L	GF	GA	GD	W	D	L	GF	GA	GD
34	26	2	6	86	26	+60	80	15	1	1	50	11	+39	11	1	5	36	15	+21

Source: Eredivisie

==== Results by round ====
Round	1	2	3	4	5	6	7	8	9	10	11	12	13	14	15	16	17	18	19	20	21	22	23	24	25	26	27	28	29	30	31	32	33	34
Ground	H	A	H	A	A	H	H	H	A	H	A	A	H	A	H	A	H	H	H	A	A	A	H	H	A	A	H	A	H	A	A	H	H	A
Result	W	W	W	W	D	W	W	W	L	D	W	W	W	W	W	W	W	W	W	W	L	W	W	W	W	L	W	L	W	W	W	W	L	L
Position	2	5	3	2	1	1	1	1	1	2	2	2	2	2	2	1	1	1	1	1	1	1	1	1	1	1	1	1	1	1	1	1	1	1

Source: Eredivisie
A = Away; H = Home; W = Win; D = Draw; L = Loss

==== Matches ====
Fixtures listed by date played; matchday numbers shown are the official league rounds.

15 August 1993 1	Ajax	3–0	RKC Waalwijk	Amsterdam
CEST (UTC+2)	Rijkaard 3' (yellow card); Petersen 49'; Overmars 66'	Report	Werdekker (yellow card); Valk (yellow card)	Stadium: De Meer Stadion; Attendance: 18,302; Referee: Frans Houben

22 August 1993 6	Utrecht	1–4	Ajax	Utrecht
CEST (UTC+2)	Smolarek 75'; Roest (yellow card) van der Net (yellow card); Bijl (yellow card)	Report	Litmanen 45', 68'; Rijkaard 54', 64' (yellow card); F. de Boer (yellow card)	Stadium: Stadion Nieuw Galgenwaard; Attendance: 14,500; Referee: Dick Jol

25 August 1993 3	Ajax	3–0	Sparta Rotterdam	Amsterdam
CEST (UTC+2)	van den Brom 70'; Oulida 79'; George 83'; Silooy (yellow card)	Report	Jalink (yellow card)	Stadium: De Meer Stadion; Attendance: 19,200; Referee: Hugo Luijten

29 August 1993 4	Vitesse	0–1	Ajax	Arnhem
CEST (UTC+2)	Bos (yellow card); Laamers (yellow card)	Report	Litmanen 51'	Stadium: Nieuw Monnikenhuize; Attendance: 11,637; Referee: Hans Reygwart

1 September 1993 2	MVV Maastricht	1–1	Ajax	Maastricht
CEST (UTC+2)	Lanckohr 57'; Delahaye (yellow card); Roelofsen (yellow card); Reijners (yellow card)	Report	Litmanen 89' van Vossen (yellow card)	Stadium: De Geusselt; Attendance: 10,732; Referee: Jaap Uilenberg

5 September 1993 5	Ajax	2–0	PSV Eindhoven	Amsterdam
CEST (UTC+2)	George 72'; Litmanen 88'	Report		Stadium: Olympisch Stadion; Attendance: 38,321; Referee: Mario van der Ende

12 September 1993 7	Ajax	2–0	Roda JC	Amsterdam
CEST (UTC+2)	Litmanen 35', 88' (pen.)	Report	Doomernik (yellow card)	Stadium: De Meer Stadion; Attendance: 18,886; Referee: John Blankenstein

3 October 1993 9	Ajax	2–0	VVV-Venlo	Amsterdam
CET (UTC+1)	Rijkaard 38'; Litmanen 54'	Report	Hanssen (yellow card)	Stadium: De Meer Stadion; Attendance: 18,554; Referee: Jef van Vliet

17 October 1993 10	Twente	2–1	Ajax	Enschede
CET (UTC+1)	Mols 48'; Boerebach 90' (yellow card); Pahlplatz (yellow card)	Report	Rijkaard 83' (yellow card)	Stadium: Diekman Stadion; Attendance: 13,300; Referee: Mario van der Ende

24 October 1993 11	Ajax	2–2	Feyenoord	Amsterdam
CET (UTC+1)	Litmanen 21', 88'; Blind (yellow card); Silooy (yellow card)	Report	Scholten 6'; Esajas 18' de Wolf (yellow card) van Loen (yellow card)	Stadium: Olympisch Stadion; Attendance: 41,395; Referee: John Blankenstein

27 October 1993 8	Cambuur	0–3	Ajax	Leeuwarden
CET (UTC+1)		Report	Rijkaard 7'; Overmars 58'; Litmanen 69'	Stadium: Cambuur Stadion; Attendance: 12,500; Referee: Dick van Egmond

30 October 1993 12	NAC	0–5	Ajax	Breda
CET (UTC+1)	Wilnis (yellow card)	Report	Litmanen 7', 66'; Pettersson 47'; Alflen 61'; Overmars 69'; Blind (yellow card)	Stadium: NAC Stadion; Attendance: 11,684; Referee: Roelof Luinge

7 November 1993 13	Ajax	3–1	Volendam	Amsterdam
CET (UTC+1)	Litmanen 45'; Pettersson 50'; R. de Boer 71'	Report	de Freitas 90'; Steur (yellow card)	Stadium: De Meer Stadion; Attendance: 19,151; Referee: Herman van Dijk

21 November 1993 14	Groningen	0–4	Ajax	Groningen
CET (UTC+1)	Gall (yellow card)	Report	Seedorf 54'; Overmars 70'; George 72'; Pettersson 73'	Stadium: Stadion Oosterpark; Attendance: 14,577; Referee: Frans Houben

28 November 1993 15	Ajax	4–0	Go Ahead Eagles	Amsterdam
CET (UTC+1)	Litmanen 49', 84'; Overmars 55'; F. de Boer 68'; Blind (yellow card)	Report		Stadium: De Meer Stadion; Attendance: 18,975; Referee: Dick Jol

6 December 1993 16	Heerenveen	1–4	Ajax	Heerenveen
CET (UTC+1)	Keur 39'; Echteld (yellow card)	Report	Litmanen 18'; Seedorf 45'; Overmars 52'; R. de Boer 84'	Stadium: Abe Lenstra Stadion; Attendance: 14,000; Referee: Jaap Uilenberg

12 December 1993 17	Ajax	3–1	Willem II	Amsterdam
CET (UTC+1)	van Arum 55' (o.g.); Litmanen 67'; R. de Boer 75'	Report	van Arum 40'	Stadium: De Meer Stadion; Attendance: 19,441; Referee: Mario van der Ende

16 January 1994 19	Ajax	4–1	MVV Maastricht	Amsterdam
CET (UTC+1)	Rijkaard 21'; Blind 31'; Litmanen 72'; Overmars 82' van den Brom (yellow card)	Report	Roelofsen 26'; Delahaye (yellow card)	Stadium: De Meer Stadion; Attendance: 19,197; Referee: Dick Jol

30 January 1994 21	Ajax	3–1	Vitesse	Amsterdam
CET (UTC+1)	Litmanen 19', 88'; Pettersson 65' van den Brom (yellow card)	Report	Loeffen 7'; Laamers (yellow card)	Stadium: De Meer Stadion; Attendance: 19,116; Referee: René Temmink

2 February 1994 18	RKC Waalwijk	0–3	Ajax	Waalwijk
CET (UTC+1)		Report	Rijkaard 40'; Oulida 59'; Overmars 61'	Stadium: Sportpark Olympia; Attendance: 6,000; Referee: Cees van der Neut

6 February 1994 22	PSV Eindhoven	4–1	Ajax	Eindhoven
CET (UTC+1)	Numan 12'; Lamptey 25', 49'; Kieft 30'; Wouters (yellow card)	Report	Overmars 89'; F. de Boer (yellow card)	Stadium: Philips Stadion; Attendance: 30,000; Referee: Jaap Uilenberg

13 February 1994 20	Sparta Rotterdam	0–1	Ajax	Rotterdam
CET (UTC+1)	de Bruin (yellow card)	Report	F. de Boer 55' van Vossen (yellow card)	Stadium: Het Kasteel; Attendance: 12,500; Referee: John Blankenstein

20 February 1994 23	Ajax	3–0	Utrecht	Amsterdam
CET (UTC+1)	Seedorf 4'; Litmanen 14'; Davids 32'; F. de Boer (yellow card)	Report		Stadium: De Meer Stadion; Attendance: 19,222; Referee: Jan Wegereef

6 March 1994 25	Ajax	3–2	Cambuur	Amsterdam
CET (UTC+1)	Litmanen 62'; Pettersson 74' van Vossen 80'	Report	Meijer 36'; Elzinga 44' (yellow card); Uhlenbeek (yellow card) (yellow-red card) 68' de Gier	Stadium: De Meer Stadion; Attendance: 19,230; Referee: Jef van Vliet

13 March 1994 26	VVV-Venlo	0–1	Ajax	Venlo
CET (UTC+1)		Report	van den Brom 2'	Stadium: De Koel; Attendance: 14,189; Referee: Wout Schaap

27 March 1994 28	Feyenoord	2–1	Ajax	Rotterdam
CEST (UTC+2)	de Wolf 57'; Heus 61' (pen.) (yellow card); Bosz (yellow card)	Report	Kanu 31' van der Sar (yellow card); Blind (yellow card)	Stadium: De Kuip; Attendance: 46,000; Referee: John Blankenstein

6 April 1994 29	Ajax	5–0	NAC	Amsterdam
CEST (UTC+2)	Rijkaard 13'; Pettersson 25' (pen.), 52'; Overmars 37'; Kanu 42'	Report		Stadium: De Meer Stadion; Attendance: 19,424; Referee: Frans Houben

12 April 1994 30	Volendam	1–0	Ajax	Volendam
CEST (UTC+2)	Obdam 36' de Freitas (yellow card)	Report	Davids (yellow card)	Stadium: Kras Stadion; Attendance: 28,000; Referee: Roelof Luinge

17 April 1994 27	Ajax	6–0	Twente	Amsterdam
CEST (UTC+2)	Pettersson 8'; George 11'; R. de Boer 27'; Overmars 31', 76'; Litmanen 60' (pen.); Blind (yellow card) (yellow-red card) 71'	Report	Boerebach (yellow card) ten Hag (yellow card); Gaasbeek (yellow card)	Stadium: De Meer Stadion; Attendance: 18,801; Referee: Jef van Vliet

24 April 1994 32	Go Ahead Eagles	0–3	Ajax	Deventer
CEST (UTC+2)	Hulshoff (yellow card); Heering (yellow card)	Report	Pettersson 5', 39'; Litmanen 28'; Davids (yellow card)	Stadium: De Adelaarshorst; Attendance: 11,435; Referee: Herman van Dijk

27 April 1994 24	Roda JC	1–2	Ajax	Kerkrade
CEST (UTC+2)	Babangida 7'	Report	Litmanen 34'; Davids 39'	Stadium: Sportpark Kaalheide; Attendance: 19,000; Referee: Mario van der Ende

1 May 1994 33	Ajax	2–1	Heerenveen	Amsterdam
CEST (UTC+2)	Rijkaard 65'; Pettersson 68'	Report	Verbeek 88' (yellow card)	Stadium: De Meer Stadion; Attendance: 41,000; Referee: René Temmink

3 May 1994 31	Ajax	0–2	Groningen	Amsterdam
CEST (UTC+2)	Menzo (yellow card); Blind (yellow card)	Report	Huizingh 28'; Hamming 62'; Brinks (yellow card)	Stadium: De Meer Stadion; Attendance: 18,469; Referee: John Blankenstein

8 May 1994 34	Willem II	2–1	Ajax	Tilburg
CEST (UTC+2)	Abdellaoui 39' van Arum 57'	Report	Seedorf 82'	Stadium: Gemeentelijk Sportpark Tilburg; Attendance: 12,000; Referee: Ab Schuurmans

=== KNVB Cup ===
10 November 1993 Third round	Ajax	8–3	Heerenveen	Amsterdam
CET (UTC+1)	Pettersson 20', 47'; F. de Boer 39'; R. de Boer 43' van den Brom 49'; George 56', 90'; Petersen 64'	Report	Alberda 22', 65', 76'	Stadium: De Meer Stadion; Attendance: 20,700; Referee: Jaap Uilenberg

15 December 1993 Round of 16	Ajax	4–1	Twente	Amsterdam
CET (UTC+1)	R. de Boer 40'; Pettersson 51', 55'; Blind 84' (pen.) van den Brom (yellow card)	Report	Leurink 63'	Stadium: De Meer Stadion; Attendance: 12,543; Referee: Roelof Luinge

9 February 1994 Quarter-finals	Ajax	7–1	Helmond Sport	Amsterdam
CET (UTC+1)	Davids 8'; Blind 41'; F. de Boer 44'; Petersen 53'; Litmanen 60', 71' van Vossen 74'; Oulida (yellow card)	Report	Ton 88'	Stadium: De Meer Stadion; Attendance: 13,000; Referee: Ab Schuurmans

20 March 1994 Semi-finals	Ajax	1–2	NEC	Amsterdam
CET (UTC+1)	Blind 9'; Rijkaard (yellow card); Reuser (yellow card)	Report	Kooistra 76'; Lok 82' (yellow card); Hoekman (yellow card)	Stadium: De Meer Stadion; Attendance: 17,107; Referee: Roelof Luinge

=== European Cup Winners' Cup ===
==== First round ====
17 September 1993 First leg	Hajduk Split (Croatia)	1–0	(Netherlands) Ajax	Ljubljana
20:15 CEST (UTC+2)	Mornar 44'	Report		Stadium: Bežigrad Stadium; Attendance: 8,909; Referee: Fabio Baldas (Italy)

29 September 1993 Second leg	Ajax (Netherlands)	6–0 (6–1 agg.)	(Croatia) Hajduk Split	Amsterdam
20:00 CET (UTC+1)	R. de Boer 11'; Davids 37', 76'; Litmanen 56'; F. de Boer 61'; Pettersson 73'	Report		Stadium: Olympisch Stadion; Attendance: 33,000; Referee: Patrick Kelly (Republic of Ireland)

==== Second round ====
20 October 1993 First leg	Ajax (Netherlands)	2–1	(Turkey) Beşiktaş	Amsterdam
19:30 CET (UTC+1)	Rijkaard 60'; R. de Boer 81'	Report	Mehmet 40'	Stadium: Olympisch Stadion; Attendance: 42,000; Referee: Keith Burge (Wales)

2 November 1993 Second leg	Beşiktaş (Turkey)	0–4 (1–6 agg.)	(Netherlands) Ajax	Istanbul
20:00 CET (UTC+1)	Çetin (yellow card); Günçar (yellow card)	Report	Litmanen 19', 72', 75'; Pettersson 78'; George (yellow card)	Stadium: BJK İnönü Stadium; Attendance: 27,115; Referee: Manuel Díaz Vega (Spain)

==== Quarter-finals ====
3 March 1994 First leg	Ajax (Netherlands)	0–0	(Italy) Parma	Amsterdam
20:00 CET (UTC+1)	Blind (yellow card); R. de Boer (yellow card)	Report	Apolloni (yellow card)	Stadium: Olympisch Stadion; Attendance: 39,000; Referee: Philip Don (England)

16 March 1994 Second leg	Parma (Italy)	2–0 (2–0 agg.)	(Netherlands) Ajax	Parma
17:45 CET (UTC+1)	Minotti 16'; Brolin 49'	Report		Stadium: Stadio Ennio Tardini; Attendance: 24,212; Referee: Frans Van Den Wijngaert (Belgium)

=== Appearances and goals ===
As of 2 November 2026

No.	Pos	Nat	Player	Total		Eredivisie		KNVB Cup		European Cup Winners' Cup		Dutch Supercup	
No.	Pos	Nat	Player	Apps	Goals	Apps	Goals	Apps	Goals	Apps	Goals	Apps	Goals
	GK	(Netherlands) NED	van der Sar	43	0	32	0	4	0	6	0	1	0
	GK	(Netherlands) NED	Menzo	2	0	2	0	0	0	0	0	0	0
	DF	(Netherlands) NED	Silooy	41	0	31+2	0	4	0	3	0	1	0
	DF	(Netherlands) NED	F. de Boer	45	7	34	2	4	3	6	1	1	1
	DF	(Netherlands) NED	Blind	41	4	30	1	4	3	6	0	1	0
	MF	(Netherlands) NED	Rijkaard	41	11	30	10	4	0	6	1	1	0
	MF	(Finland) FIN	Litmanen	38	34	28+2	26	2	2	5	4	1	2
	MF	(Netherlands) NED	R. de Boer	38	8	26+2	4	3	2	5+1	2	1	0
	MF	(Netherlands) NED	van den Brom	35	3	22+5	2	2	1	4+1	0	1	0
	MF	(Netherlands) NED	Seedorf	24	4	13+6	4	2	0	2	0	1	0
	MF	(Netherlands) NED	Davids	21	5	15	2	2	1	4	2	0	0
	MF	(Netherlands) NED	Kreek	19	0	9+6	0	0	0	3	0	1	0
	MF	(Netherlands) NED	Oulida	12	2	6+4	2	1	0	1	0	0	0
	MF	(Netherlands) NED	Alflen	8	1	1+3	1	1	0	2+1	0	0	0
	MF	(Netherlands) NED	Reuser	4	0	+2	0	+1	0	+1	0	0	0
	MF	(Netherlands) NED	Tuhuteru	3	0	+1	0	+1	0	+1	0	0	0
	FW	(Nigeria) NGR	Kanu	7	2	3+3	2	+1	0	0	0	0	0
	FW	(Netherlands) NED	Overmars	43	13	33	12	4	0	4+1	0	1	1
	FW	(Nigeria) NGR	George	34	6	25+2	4	3	2	4	0	0	0
	FW	(Sweden) SWE	Pettersson	41	17	22+10	11	2+1	4	3+3	2	0	0
	FW	(Netherlands) NED	van Vossen	20	2	6+9	1	1+1	1	1+2	0	0	0
	FW	(Denmark) DEN	Petersen	17	3	6+6	1	1+2	2	1+1	0	0	0
	FW	(Netherlands) NED	Huijsen	1	0	0	0	0	0	0	0	+1	0
