= 1993–94 in Dutch football =

The 1993/1994 season in Dutch football saw Ajax Amsterdam winning the title in the Eredivisie, while Feyenoord Rotterdam won the Dutch National Cup.

== PTT Telecom Cup ==
August 8, 1993

| Feyenoord | 0–4 | Ajax |
|---|---|---|
| | | Litmanen 18', 62'; F. de Boer 47'; Overmars 61' |

De Kuip, Rotterdam
Attendance: 29.000
Referee: Blankenstein

== Eredivisie ==
| Position | Team | Points | Played | Won | Drawn | Lost | For | Against | Difference |
|---|---|---|---|---|---|---|---|---|---|
| 1 | Ajax | 54 | 34 | 26 | 2 | 6 | 86 | 26 | +60 |
| 2 | Feyenoord | 51 | 34 | 19 | 13 | 2 | 61 | 27 | +34 |
| 3 | PSV | 44 | 34 | 17 | 10 | 7 | 60 | 36 | +24 |
| 4 | Vitesse Arnhem | 40 | 34 | 17 | 6 | 11 | 63 | 37 | +26 |
| 5 | FC Twente | 39 | 34 | 15 | 9 | 10 | 57 | 43 | +14 |
| 6 | Roda JC | 38 | 34 | 15 | 8 | 11 | 55 | 40 | +15 |
| 7 | NAC | 38 | 34 | 14 | 10 | 10 | 61 | 52 | +9 |
| 8 | Willem II | 37 | 34 | 15 | 7 | 12 | 48 | 42 | +6 |
| 9 | Sparta | 32 | 34 | 12 | 8 | 14 | 58 | 57 | +1 |
| 10 | MVV | 32 | 34 | 11 | 10 | 13 | 49 | 58 | -9 |
| 11 | FC Volendam | 30 | 34 | 13 | 4 | 17 | 46 | 55 | -9 |
| 12 | Go Ahead Eagles | 28 | 34 | 10 | 8 | 16 | 44 | 57 | -13 |
| 13 | SC Heerenveen | 28 | 34 | 9 | 10 | 15 | 35 | 61 | -26 |
| 14 | FC Groningen | 26 | 34 | 9 | 8 | 17 | 42 | 65 | -23 |
| 15 | FC Utrecht | 26 | 34 | 9 | 8 | 17 | 40 | 63 | -23 |
| 16 | RKC | 25 | 34 | 8 | 9 | 17 | 38 | 58 | -18 |
| 17 | VVV | 25 | 34 | 7 | 11 | 16 | 30 | 62 | -32 |
| 18 | Cambuur | 19 | 34 | 6 | 7 | 21 | 28 | 64 | -36 |

- Champions League : Ajax
- Cup Winners Cup: Feyenoord
- UEFA Cup: PSV, Vitesse and FC Twente
- Promotion / relegation play-offs ("Nacompetitie"): RKC and VVV
- Relegated: Cambuur

=== Topscorers ===
| Position | Player | Nationality | Club | Goals |
|---|---|---|---|---|
| 1 | Jari Litmanen | (Finland) | Ajax | 26 |
| 2 | Pierre van Hooijdonk | (Netherlands) | NAC | 25 |
| 3 | Hans Gillhaus | (Netherlands) | Vitesse | 22 |
| 4 | John Lammers | (Netherlands) | NAC | 19 |
| 5 | Richard Roelofsen | (Netherlands) | MVV | 16 |
| 6 | Maurice Graef | (Netherlands) | VVV | 14 |

=== Awards ===
==== Dutch Footballer of the Year ====
- 1993 — Jari Litmanen (Ajax Amsterdam)
- 1994 — Ronald de Boer (Ajax Amsterdam)

==== Dutch Golden Shoe Winner ====
- 1993 — Marc Overmars (Ajax Amsterdam)
- 1994 — Ed de Goey (Feyenoord Rotterdam)

=== Ajax Winning Squad 1993-'94 ===
Goal

- (Netherlands) Stanley Menzo
- (Netherlands) Edwin van der Sar

Defence

- (Netherlands) Rob Alflen
- (Netherlands) Danny Blind
- (Netherlands) Frank de Boer
- (Netherlands) Frank Rijkaard
- (Netherlands) Sonny Silooy

Midfield

- (Netherlands) Ronald de Boer
- (Netherlands) John van den Brom
- (Netherlands) Edgar Davids
- (Netherlands) Michel Kreek
- (Finland) Jari Litmanen
- (Netherlands) Tarik Oulida
- (Netherlands) Martijn Reuser
- (Netherlands) Clarence Seedorf

Attack

- (Nigeria) Finidi George
- (Nigeria) Nwankwo Kanu
- (Netherlands) Marc Overmars
- (Denmark) Dan Petersen
- (Sweden) Stefan Pettersson
- (Netherlands) Peter van Vossen

Management

- (Netherlands) Louis van Gaal (Coach)
- (Netherlands) Gerard van der Lem (Assistant)
- (Netherlands) Bobby Haarms (Assistant)

== Eerste Divisie ==
| Position | Team | Points | Played | Won | Drawn | Lost | For | Against | Difference |
|---|---|---|---|---|---|---|---|---|---|
| 1 | Dordrecht '90 | 46 | 34 | 20 | 6 | 8 | 64 | 36 | +28 |
| 2 | NEC | 45 | 34 | 19 | 7 | 8 | 69 | 44 | +25 |
| 3 | AZ | 42 | 34 | 16 | 10 | 8 | 60 | 31 | +29 |
| 4 | SC Heracles | 41 | 34 | 16 | 9 | 9 | 68 | 37 | +31 |
| 5 | Telstar | 40 | 34 | 15 | 10 | 9 | 60 | 32 | +28 |
| 6 | De Graafschap | 38 | 34 | 13 | 12 | 9 | 45 | 37 | +8 |
| 7 | ADO Den Haag | 38 | 34 | 14 | 10 | 10 | 62 | 56 | +6 |
| 8 | FC Zwolle | 38 | 34 | 15 | 8 | 11 | 51 | 53 | -2 |
| 9 | FC Emmen | 36 | 34 | 14 | 8 | 12 | 49 | 58 | -9 |
| 10 | Fortuna Sittard | 33 | 34 | 11 | 11 | 12 | 36 | 36 | 0 |
| 11 | FC Den Bosch | 33 | 34 | 12 | 9 | 13 | 55 | 57 | -2 |
| 12 | Excelsior | 30 | 34 | 10 | 10 | 14 | 41 | 54 | -13 |
| 13 | Helmond Sport | 30 | 34 | 9 | 12 | 13 | 35 | 51 | -16 |
| 14 | RBC | 29 | 34 | 11 | 7 | 16 | 60 | 69 | -9 |
| 15 | Haarlem | 25 | 34 | 9 | 7 | 18 | 42 | 62 | -20 |
| 16 | Eindhoven | 24 | 34 | 5 | 14 | 15 | 31 | 64 | -33 |
| 17 | Veendam | 23 | 34 | 6 | 11 | 17 | 39 | 57 | -18 |
| 18 | TOP Oss | 21 | 34 | 7 | 7 | 20 | 36 | 69 | -33 |

- Promoted : Dordrecht '90
- Promotion / Relegation play-offs ("Nacompetitie") : NEC, AZ, Heracles, Telstar, Graafschap and ADO Den Haag

== Promotion and relegation ==
=== Group A ===
| Position | Team | Points | Played | Won | Drawn | Lost | For | Against | Difference |
|---|---|---|---|---|---|---|---|---|---|
| 1 | RKC | 7 | 6 | 3 | 1 | 2 | 14 | 7 | +7 |
| 2 | Telstar | 6 | 6 | 3 | 0 | 3 | 9 | 11 | -2 |
| 3 | ADO Den Haag | 6 | 6 | 3 | 0 | 3 | 5 | 12 | -7 |
| 4 | AZ | 5 | 6 | 2 | 1 | 3 | 10 | 8 | +2 |

=== Group B ===
| Position | Team | Points | Played | Won | Drawn | Lost | For | Against | Difference |
|---|---|---|---|---|---|---|---|---|---|
| 1 | NEC | 12 | 6 | 6 | 0 | 0 | 14 | 5 | +9 |
| 2 | VVV | 6 | 6 | 3 | 0 | 3 | 11 | 9 | +2 |
| 3 | SC Heracles | 4 | 6 | 2 | 0 | 4 | 8 | 12 | -4 |
| 4 | De Graafschap | 2 | 6 | 1 | 0 | 5 | 10 | 17 | -7 |

- Stayed / Promoted : RKC Waalwijk and NEC Nijmegen
- Relegated: VVV Venlo

== KNVB Cup ==
Quarter-finals
February 9
NAC | 1
PSV | 0
February 9
RKC | 2
Feyenoord | 4
February 9
ADO Den Haag | 1
NEC | 3
February 9
Ajax | 7
Helmond Sport | 1

Semi-finals
March 9
NAC | 0
Feyenoord | 3
March 20
Ajax | 1
NEC | 2

Final
May 12 - Rotterdam
Feyenoord | 2
NEC | 1
