= 1994–95 in Dutch football =

The 1994/95 season in Dutch football saw Ajax Amsterdam winning the title in the Eredivisie, while Feyenoord Rotterdam won the Dutch National Cup. For the first time in history of Dutch professional football a club stayed unbeaten in the highest league. Ajax suffered only one loss that year, losing to Feyenoord in the cup.

== Super Cup ==
August 21, 1994

Ajax	3–0	Feyenoord
Litmanen 13'; Oulida 21'; Kluivert 25'

Olympisch Stadion, Amsterdam
Attendance: 23.500
Referee: Blankenstein

== Eredivisie ==
Position	Team	Points	Played	Won	Drawn	Lost	For	Against	Difference
1	Ajax	61	34	27	7	0	106	28	+78
2	Roda JC	54	34	22	10	2	70	28	+42
3	PSV	47	34	20	7	7	85	46	+39
4	Feyenoord	43	34	19	5	10	66	56	+10
5	FC Twente	42	34	17	8	9	66	50	+16
6	Vitesse Arnhem	40	34	14	12	8	55	44	+11
7	Willem II	34	34	13	8	13	44	48	-4
8	RKC	33	34	11	11	12	46	49	-3
9	SC Heerenveen	30	34	12	6	16	47	60	-13
10	NAC	29	34	11	7	16	54	60	-6
11	FC Volendam	29	34	8	13	13	37	55	-18
12	FC Utrecht	27	34	8	11	15	43	60	-17
13	FC Groningen	26	34	8	10	16	49	64	-15
14	Sparta	26	34	8	10	16	42	58	-16
15	NEC	25	34	9	7	18	48	60	-12
16	MVV	23	34	7	9	18	41	71	-30
17	Go Ahead Eagles	23	34	7	9	18	42	77	-35
18	Dordrecht '90	20	34	5	10	19	40	67	-27

- Champions League : Ajax
- Cup Winners Cup: Feyenoord
- UEFA Cup: Roda JC and PSV
- Promotion / relegation play-offs ("Nacompetitie"): MVV and Go Ahead Eagles
- Relegated: Dordrecht '90

=== Topscorers ===
Position	Player	Nationality	Club	Goals
1	Ronaldo	(Brazil)	PSV	30
2	Patrick Kluivert	(Netherlands)	Ajax	18
3	Jari Litmanen	(Finland)	Ajax	17
4	Harry Decheiver	(Netherlands)	RKC	16
	Maurice Graef	(Netherlands)	Roda JC	16

=== Awards ===
==== Dutch Footballer of the Year ====
- 1994 — Ronald de Boer (Ajax Amsterdam)
- 1995 — Luc Nilis (PSV Eindhoven)

==== Dutch Golden Shoe Winner ====
- 1994 — Ed de Goey (Feyenoord Rotterdam)
- 1995 — Danny Blind (Ajax Amsterdam)

=== Title-winning squad ===
Goal

- (Netherlands) Fred Grim
- (Netherlands) Edwin van der Sar

Defence

- (Netherlands) Danny Blind
- (Netherlands) Frank de Boer
- (Netherlands) Winston Bogarde
- (Netherlands) Michael Reiziger
- (Netherlands) Frank Rijkaard
- (Netherlands) Sonny Silooy
- (Netherlands) Mendel Witzenhausen

Midfield

- (Netherlands) Ronald de Boer
- (Netherlands) John van den Brom
- (Netherlands) Edgar Davids
- (Netherlands) Michel Kreek
- (Finland) Jari Litmanen
- (Netherlands) Kiki Musampa
- (Netherlands) Tarik Oulida
- (Netherlands) Martijn Reuser
- (Netherlands) Clarence Seedorf

Attack

- (Nigeria) Finidi George
- (Nigeria) Nwankwo Kanu
- (Netherlands) Patrick Kluivert
- (Netherlands) Marc Overmars
- (Netherlands) Peter van Vossen
- (Netherlands) Nordin Wooter

Management

- (Netherlands) Louis van Gaal (coach)
- (Netherlands) Gerard van der Lem (assistant)
- (Netherlands) Bobby Haarms (assistant)

== Eerste Divisie ==
Position	Team	Points	Played	Won	Drawn	Lost	For	Against	Difference
1	Fortuna Sittard	51	34	23	5	6	72	27	+45
2	De Graafschap	50	34	21	8	5	70	45	+25
3	Excelsior	44	34	18	8	8	71	49	+22
4	FC Den Haag	40	34	16	8	10	71	52	+19
5	AZ	39	34	16	7	11	59	40	+19
6	SC Heracles	39	34	16	7	11	62	46	+16
7	Cambuur	39	34	14	11	9	50	43	+7
8	Veendam	38	34	16	6	12	54	41	+13
9	TOP Oss	38	34	14	10	10	59	47	+12
10	FC Emmen	35	34	13	9	12	56	61	-5
11	Telstar	30	34	11	8	15	49	59	-10
12	VVV	29	34	10	9	15	54	62	-8
13	Helmond Sport	29	34	11	7	16	57	67	-10
14	FC Zwolle	28	34	10	8	16	36	59	-23
15	RBC	27	34	10	7	17	39	48	-9
16	Haarlem	24	34	8	8	18	50	69	-19
17	Eindhoven	20	34	8	4	22	35	78	-43
18	FC Den Bosch	12	34	4	4	26	39	90	-51

== Promotion and relegation ==
=== Group A ===
Position	Team	Points	Played	Won	Drawn	Lost	For	Against	Difference
1	De Graafschap	9	6	4	1	1	17	8	+9
2	FC Den Haag	8	6	4	0	2	11	6	-5
3	SC Heracles	5	6	2	1	3	8	15	-7
4	MVV	2	6	0	2	4	8	15	-7

=== Group B ===
Position	Team	Points	Played	Won	Drawn	Lost	For	Against	Difference
1	Go Ahead Eagles	11	6	5	1	0	13	6	+7
2	Excelsior	6	6	3	0	3	5	7	-2
3	VVV	4	6	1	2	3	10	11	-1
4	AZ	3	6	1	1	4	9	13	-4

- Promoted : Fortuna Sittard and De Graafschap
- Relegated: Dordrecht '90 and MVV Maastricht

== KNVB Cup ==
Quarter-finals
February 24
SC Heerenveen	3
NAC	2
March 8
Ajax	1
Feyenoord	2
February 25
SC Heracles	0
FC Volendam	1
March 8
FC Utrecht	2
Ajax II	1

Semi-finals
March 22
SC Heerenveen	0
Feyenoord	1
March 22
FC Utrecht	0
FC Volendam	1

Final
May 25 - Rotterdam
Feyenoord	2
FC Volendam	1
