= Sonny Silooy =

Dutch footballer and coach (born 1963)

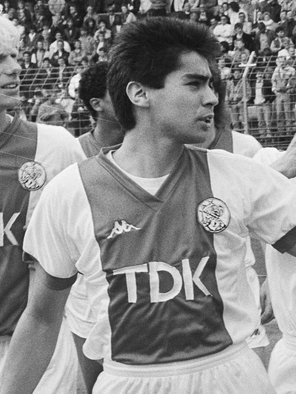
- Silooy in 1987

Personal information
- Full name: Jan Jacobus Silooy
- Date of birth: 31 August 1963 (age 63)
- Place of birth: Rotterdam, Netherlands
- Position: Defender

Youth career
- Zilvermeeuwen
- ZVV

Senior career*
Years	Team	Apps	(Gls)
1980–1987	Ajax	157	(4)
1987–1989	Matra Racing	55	(2)
1989–1996	Ajax	111	(0)
1996–1998	Arminia Bielefeld	37	(0)
1998–2000	De Graafschap	46	(0)
Total		406	(6)

International career
1983–1993	Netherlands	25	(0)

Managerial career
- 2003–2008: Ajax youth
- 2010: Dayton Dutch Lions
- 2011–2014: D.C. United (assistant)
- 2014–2015: Netherlands U18 (assistant)
- 2015: Sparta Rotterdam (U17)
- 2015: Netherlands U19 (assistant)
- 2015–2016: Al Shabab (U19)
- 2020–2022: Sharjah (director of youth development)
- 2024–2026: Ajax women (assistant)
- * Club domestic league appearances and goals

Jan Jacobus "Sonny" Silooy (born 31 August 1963) is a Dutch former professional footballer and football manager. He is currently the assistant coach with AFC Ajax. His last managing post was for the under-19 team for United Arab Emirates club Al Shabab. His most successful time as a player was in his period with Ajax. He won seven Eredivisie titles, four KNVB Cups, three Johan Cruyff Shields, one UEFA Champions League, one UEFA Cup Winners' Cup, one UEFA Cup, one UEFA Super Cup and one Intercontinental Cup.

== Club career ==
Silooy was born in Rotterdam. He played as a right or central defender and is one of the legends of Ajax, where he made his debut on 3 May 1981, playing over 250 league games for the Amsterdam club in two separate periods. Silooy also played for Matra Racing, Arminia Bielefeld, De Graafschap and the amateurs of GVV Unitas from Gorinchem. He played in the 1996 UEFA Champions League Final against Juventus, but missed a key penalty in the shootout which Ajax ultimately lost.

== International career ==
Silooy, a member of the Netherlands national team's squad at the 1983 FIFA World Youth Championship, obtained 25 caps, including eight appearances in Euro 88 qualifying, but never played in a major international competition.

== Coaching career ==
Silooy coached of the Jong Ajax youth academy and juniors team. In 2010, he became the head coach of the new club Dayton Dutch Lions.

He left Dayton Dutch Lions to become an assistant coach with the Major League Soccer club D.C. United. In 2015, he was appointed as head coach of Al Shabab under 19. He joined Ajax's women's team in 2024 with new head coach Hesterine de Reus.

== Career statistics ==
=== International ===
Appearances and goals by national team and year
National team	Year	Apps	Goals
Netherlands	1983	1	0
Netherlands	1984	2	0
Netherlands	1985	1	0
Netherlands	1986	7	0
Netherlands	1987	7	0
Netherlands	1988	3	0
Netherlands	1989	1	0
Netherlands	1990	0	0
Netherlands	1991	0	0
Netherlands	1992	2	0
Netherlands	1993	1	0
Total		25	0

== Honours ==
=== Player ===
Ajax

- Eredivisie: 1981–82, 1982–83, 1984–85, 1989–90, 1993–94, 1994–95, 1995–96
- KNVB Cup: 1982–83, 1985–86, 1986–87, 1992–93
- Johan Cruijff Shield: 1993, 1994, 1995
- UEFA Champions League: 1995
- UEFA Cup Winners' Cup: 1986–87
- UEFA Cup: 1991–92
- UEFA Super Cup: 1995
- Intercontinental Cup: 1995
