= Stanley Menzo =

Dutch footballer and manager

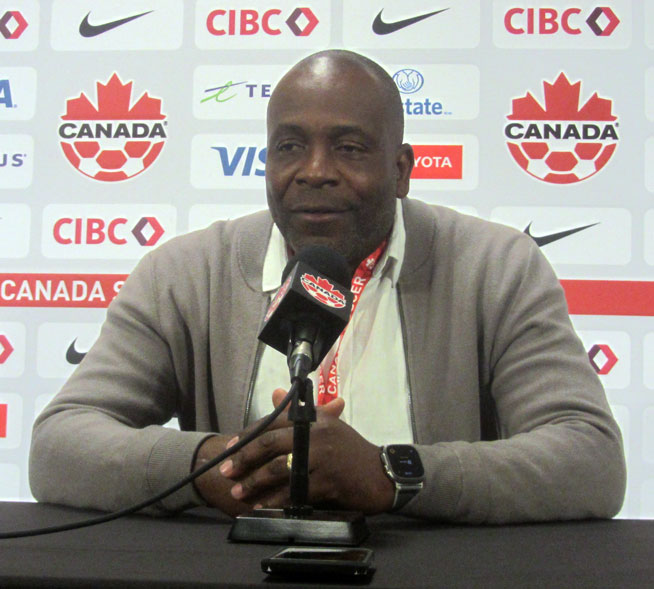
- Menzo in 2024 as manager of Suriname

Personal information
- Full name: Stanley Purl Menzo
- Date of birth: 15 October 1963 (age 63)
- Place of birth: Paramaribo, Suriname
- Height: 1.87 m (6 ft 2 in)
- Position: Goalkeeper

Youth career
- TWW Centrum
- 1980–1983: AVV Zeeburgia

Senior career*
Years	Team	Apps	(Gls)
1983–1994	Ajax	249	(0)
1983–1984	→ Haarlem (loan)	9	(0)
1994–1996	PSV	15	(0)
1996–1999	Lierse	73	(0)
1997	→ Bordeaux (loan)	10	(0)
1999–2000	Ajax	0	(0)
2001–2002	AGOVV		

International career
1989–1992	Netherlands	6	(0)

Managerial career
- 2002–2003: AGOVV
- 2003–2004: AFC
- 2005–2006: AGOVV
- 2006–2008: Volendam
- 2008–2010: Cambuur
- 2013–2014: Lierse
- 2014–2015: AFC
- 2016–2017: Ajax Cape Town
- 2021–2022: Aruba
- 2022: Suriname
- 2022–2023: Beijing Guoan
- 2024–2025: Suriname
- * Club domestic league appearances and goals

Stanley Purl Menzo (born 15 October 1963) is a Dutch football manager and former professional player who played as a goalkeeper. He last managed the Suriname national team.

He spent ten full seasons at Ajax, appearing in more than 300 official matches with the club and winning nine major titles. He represented the Netherlands national team in one World Cup and one European Championship.

Menzo has previously managed AGOVV, AFC, Volendam, Cambuur, Lierse, Ajax Cape Town, Aruba and Beijing Guoan.

== Club career ==
Born in Paramaribo, Suriname, Menzo arrived at Eredivisie giants Ajax at the age of 19, from amateurs AVV Zeeburgia.

Menzo deputised for Hans Galjé during the 1983–84 and 1984–85 seasons, in which he played only a few matches. After a loan to fellow league side Haarlem from September 1983 to March 1984, he became the starter for the 1985–86 campaign. Newly appointed manager Johan Cruyff believed that Menzo was one of the first goalkeepers who could also make his mark as a field player.

Throughout the 1980s, Menzo was subjected to racist abuse from fans.

Menzo then proceeded to remain an undisputed starter for seven full seasons, helping Ajax to the 1989–90 national title, as well as the 1986–87 European Cup Winners' Cup and the 1991–92 UEFA Cup. However, after a game in the latter competition the following season, a 4–2 loss at Auxerre, during which he scored an own goal, he lost his place to youth graduate Edwin van der Sar, and never regained it.

In the summer of 1994, Menzo signed with PSV Eindhoven, where he backed up Ronald Waterreus for two seasons. The 33-year-old managed to revive his career in Belgium with Lierse, which he helped win one league and one cup, eventually amassing nearly 100 official appearances. For a brief period of time, he also played in France for Bordeaux, arriving in August 1997 to replace Gilbert Bodart. However, having lost his place to Ulrich Ramé (who would be the club's first-choice for the next decade), he returned to Lierse in January 1998.

In the summer of 2001, after a second spell at Ajax, Menzo joined amateur club AGOVV, helping it to the amateur title. He retired from football at the end of the season.

== International career ==
Menzo gained six caps for the Netherlands, the first arriving in 1989. He then spent nearly three years without any further appearances, but was summoned for the squads present at both the 1990 FIFA World Cup and UEFA Euro 1992, as third-choice.

After legendary Hans van Breukelen retired from international play following the latter competition, Menzo was named the starter for the qualification stages of the 1994 World Cup; following two unassuming performances, the 1–2 loss in Norway and a 2–2 home draw against Poland, he was benched, and ultimately did not even make the squad at all for the World Cup (Ed de Goey, Theo Snelders and Van der Sar would be the goalkeepers listed as starter, reserve and third respectively).

== Managerial career ==
In the summer of 2004, after former Ajax teammate Marco van Basten became head coach of the national team, Menzo was named its goalkeeping coach, remaining there for two years.

When coach Peter Bosz left in June 2002, Menzo became AGOVV's manager, remaining in the position for only one season: AGOVV became a professional club in the second division, but he did not have the qualifications to exercise in that category, subsequently moving to Amsterdam-based amateur club AFC.

In February 2005, Menzo received the necessary diploma to coach professional clubs. That summer, he returned as head manager of AGOVV. A year later, he joined Volendam, lasting two seasons (incomplete) and signing with Cambuur, which he led to the second position in the second level in 2009–10, even though the team ultimately failed in the playoffs.

In October 2010, Menzo resigned from his position at Cambuur in order to join Vitesse as assistant to new head coach Albert Ferrer. In May 2013, he became the head coach of Lierse, where he stayed until his sacking at the end of August 2014. On 28 October 2016, Menzo was appointed head coach of South African Premier Soccer League team, Ajax Cape Town. He left just before Christmas 2017.

On 14 January 2019, Menzo was appointed as the manager of the reserve team of Beijing Sinobo Guoan in China. In March 2021, he was named technical manager and interim head coach of the Aruba national team.

In January 2022, he became the head coach of the Suriname national team. However, he announced that he would step down in August that year. On 29 August 2022, Menzo was appointed as the manager for Beijing Guoan's first team. His appointment was terminated less than a year later on 11 June 2023 after a mediocre start to the team's 2023 season saw the team settle in mid-table positions.

In March 2024, he reassumed the role of head coach of the Suriname national team. During the 2026 FIFA World Cup qualification third round, Suriname topped their group for much of the campaign before a decisive away loss to Guatemala dropped them to second, but they still advanced to the inter-confederation play-offs. On 2 December 2025, he resigned from the role.

In June 2026, Menzo was appointed Director of Football at Ghanaian club Asante Kotoko.

== Career statistics ==
=== International ===
Appearances and goals by national team and year
National team	Year	Apps	Goals
Netherlands	1989	1	0
Netherlands	1990	0	0
Netherlands	1991	0	0
Netherlands	1992	5	0
Total		6	0

== Honours ==
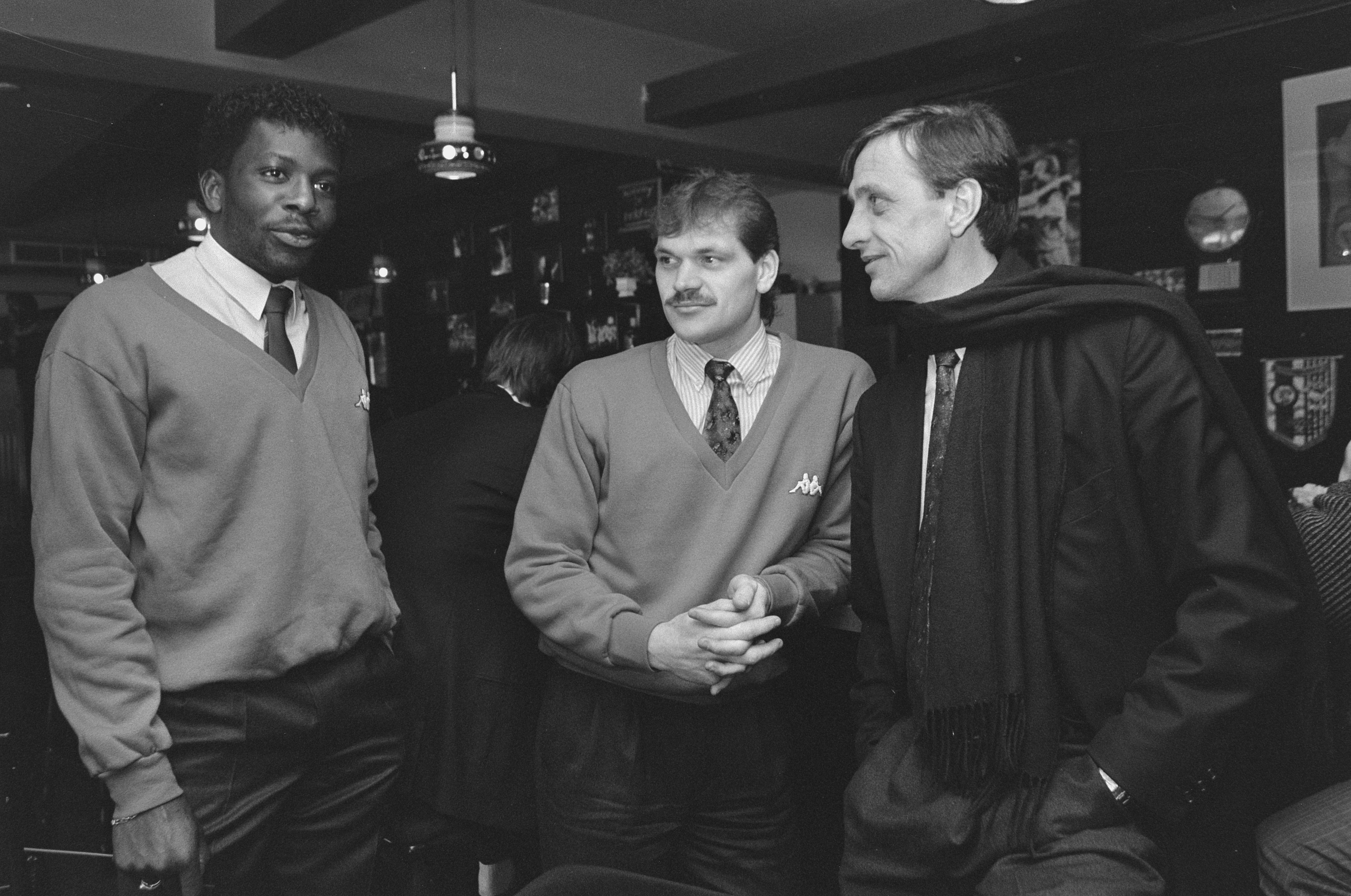
Menzo (left) with Jan Wouters (middle) and Ajax manager Johan Cruyff in 1987.

Ajax

- UEFA Cup Winners' Cup: 1986–87; runner-up 1987–88
- UEFA Cup: 1991–92
- Eredivisie: 1984-85, 1989-90, 1993-94
- KNVB Cup: 1985-86, 1986-87, 1992-93
- Dutch Super Cup (in 1996 rebranded as Johan Cruyff Shield): 1993

PSV

- KNVB Cup: 1995-96

Lierse

- Belgian Pro League: 1996–97
- Belgian Cup: 1998–99
