= The King – Jari Litmanen =

- Promotional poster
- Directed by: Arto Koskinen
- Written by: Mika Kaurismäki; Arto Koskinen
- Produced by: Mika Kaurismäki
- Starring: Jari Litmanen
- Distributed by: Marianna Films
- Release date: 28 September 2012
- Running time: 107 minutes
- Country: Finland
- Languages: Finnish, English, Dutch, Spanish

The King – Jari Litmanen (also known as King Litmanen, Finnish: Kuningas Litmanen) is a 2012 Finnish documentary film about the football player Jari Litmanen. He is considered to be Finland's greatest footballer of all time.

The film was shot in Finland, Amsterdam, Barcelona and Liverpool. It features comments of Litmanen's former teammates Danny Blind, Edwin van der Sar, Marc Overmars, Carles Puyol and Xavi, in addition to former Ajax manager Louis van Gaal. The title of the film refers to Litmanen's nickname, "The King", used by Finnish football fans.

The Dutch premier of The King – Jari Litmanen was at the International Documentary Film Festival Amsterdam in November 2012.
