= John van den Brom =

Dutch footballer and manager

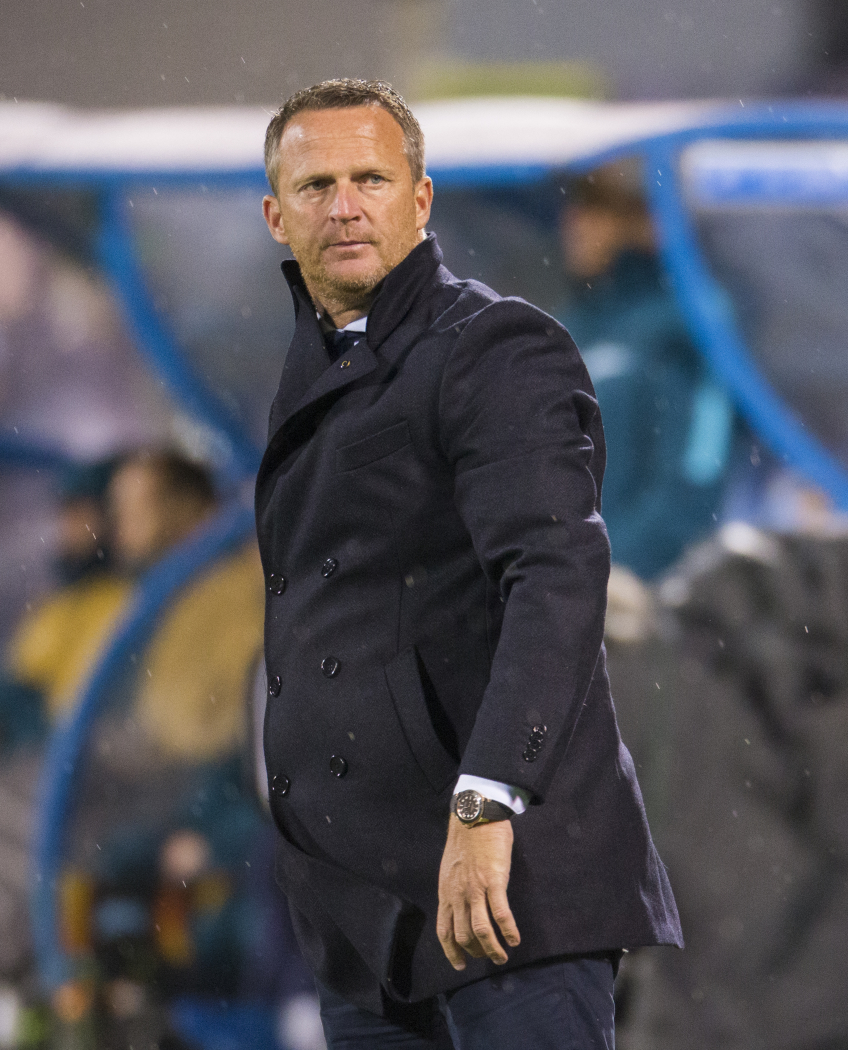
- Van den Brom in 2016 managing AZ

Personal information
- Full name: Joseph Anthonius van den Brom
- Date of birth: 4 October 1966 (age 60)
- Place of birth: Amersfoort, Netherlands
- Height: 1.91 m (6 ft 3 in)
- Position: Midfielder

Team information
- Current team: Twente (manager)

Youth career
- APWC
- AFC Quick 1890

Senior career*
Years	Team	Apps	(Gls)
1986–1993	Vitesse	225	(80)
1993–1995	Ajax	44	(7)
1995–1996	Istanbulspor	22	(3)
1996–2001	Vitesse	99	(13)
2002–2003	De Graafschap	42	(4)
Total		432	(107)

International career
1990–1993	Netherlands	2	(1)

Managerial career
- 2003–2004: Bennekom
- 2004–2007: Jong Ajax
- 2007–2010: AGOVV
- 2010–2011: ADO Den Haag
- 2011–2012: Vitesse
- 2012–2014: Anderlecht
- 2014–2019: AZ
- 2019–2020: Utrecht
- 2020–2021: Genk
- 2022: Al-Taawoun
- 2022–2023: Lech Poznań
- 2024–2025: Vitesse
- 2025–: Twente
- * Club domestic league appearances and goals

Joseph Anthonius John van den Brom (born 4 October 1966) is a Dutch professional football manager and former player who is currently the manager of Eredivisie side Twente.

As a player, he played for Vitesse, Ajax, De Graafschap and Istanbulspor. After his playing career, Van den Brom became a manager. He worked as a head coach for AGOVV Apeldoorn (2007–2010), ADO Den Haag (2010–2011), Vitesse (2011–2012) and Anderlecht (2012–2014). After managing AZ for five years, he moved to take charge of Utrecht from the 2019–20 season.

== Playing career ==
=== Club career ===
Born in Amersfoort, Netherlands, Van den Brom started his career at the amateurs of APWC in Amersfoort before signing as a professional footballer for Vitesse in 1986. After seven seasons with Vitesse, playing 225 games and scoring 80 goals, he made the move to Dutch giants Ajax, where he played for two seasons before moving abroad with Turkish side Istanbulspor. He returned to Vitesse after one season, and spent another five seasons there before signing for De Graafschap for his final season, retiring from playing in 2003.

=== International career ===
Van den Brom made two appearances for the Dutch national team. He played in the 8–0 win against Malta and the 6–0 win against San Marino. He scored one goal.

== Managerial career ==
=== Early managerial career ===
After his playing career he became head scout of De Graafschap and head coach of amateur side Bennekom, before becoming coach of the second team at Ajax, on 29 April 2004. From 2007 to 2010 he served as head coach of small Eerste Divisie club AGOVV with impressive results, also winning a place in the promotion playoffs in his last season in charge. In May 2010 he was presented as new head coach of Eredivisie club ADO Den Haag, with whom he qualified for the 2011–12 Europa League. In June 2011, Van den Brom was named as head coach of his old club Vitesse. Again, he managed to qualify for the Europa League.

=== Anderlecht ===
Van den Brom was appointed head coach of Anderlecht on 29 May 2012.

In his first season, he led the team to win the Belgian Pro League title, also qualifying for the UEFA Champions League group stage. Anderlecht impressed domestically with attacking football and a strong focus on developing young talents. His second season was more turbulent. The club struggled in the league's early stages and failed to progress beyond the Champions League group stage. Despite a late improvement, the board felt results and performances were not meeting expectations. As a result, Van den Brom was sacked on 10 March 2014 after a series of disappointing results.

=== AZ ===
van den Brom was appointed head coach of AZ Alkmaar on 27 September 2014.

In his first season, he guided AZ to an impressive third place in the Eredivisie, which earned the club qualification for the UEFA Europa League. Over the following seasons, Van den Brom built a competitive and attacking side, consistently finishing in the top half of the table and regularly qualifying for European competitions. One of his highlights came in the 2017–18 season, when AZ finished third again and reached the KNVB Cup final, which they lost against Feyenoord Rotterdam.

By the 2018–19 season, after nearly five years in charge, results had become more inconsistent, and both Van den Brom and the club felt it was time for a new challenge. He announced his departure in March 2019, finishing the season before officially leaving.

=== Three clubs in three years ===
John van den Brom was announced as head coach of Utrecht on 1 July 2019. During the 2019–20 Eredivisie season, he led the team to a sixth-place finish, securing a spot in European competition. Van den Brom parted ways with the club on 9 November 2020, to take charge of Genk.

In November 2020, Van den Brom was announced as the new manager of Belgian First Division A side Genk, following Jess Thorup's departure. He was sacked by Genk on 6 December 2021.

On 31 March 2022, Van den Brom was announced as the manager of Saudi Professional League club Al-Taawoun.

=== Lech Poznań ===
On 19 June 2022, he was announced as the manager of defending Polish Ekstraklasa champions Lech Poznań, replacing Maciej Skorża who left the team for personal reasons. He had a tumultuous start to his tenure, as Lech remained winless in the first four league games and crashed out of the UEFA Champions League first qualifying round after losing to Azerbaijani side Qarabağ 2–5 on aggregate. However, Lech rebounded, and Van den Brom led the team to a successful UEFA Europa Conference League campaign, reaching second place in the group stage which included Villarreal, Austria Wien and Hapoel Be'er Sheva, eliminating Bodø/Glimt and Djurgårdens in the knockout stages, before losing in the quarter-finals to Fiorentina, 4–6 on aggregate.

Lech's 2023–2024 campaign got off to a rocky start, crashing out of Conference League third qualifying round against Slovak side Spartak Trnava (3–4 on aggregate). On 16 December 2023, Lech drew 2–2 at Radomiak Radom, losing the win in the 96th minute. With that result, Lech scored ten points in the last eight games of the year, and headed off for the winter break sitting in third place in the league table, with an eight-point deficit to leaders Śląsk Wrocław. The following day, Van den Brom was dismissed.

=== Recent years ===
On 1 May 2024, shortly after Vitesse's relegation to Eerste Divisie was confirmed, the club announced Van den Brom would return to managing them from the 2024–25 season onwards. Almost 11 years since his exit, he signed a one-year deal.

During the 2024–25 season, Vitesse went through a turbulent period marked by severe financial troubles and a threatened license. Despite starting with a heavy 39-point deduction, van den Brom's young and largely homegrown squad managed to collect 41 points on the field, which would have placed them around 15th without the deduction. At the end of the season, the club decided not to extend his contract, aiming for a fresh start with a new coach.

On 15 September 2025, Twente officially announced the appointment of van den Brom as their new head coach, on a contract for the remainder of the 2025–26 Eredivisie season. On 27 March 2026, FC Twente extended van den Brom's contract until 2027.

== Career statistics ==
=== Club ===
Appearances and goals by club, season and competition
Club	Season	League	Apps	Goals
Vitesse	1986–87	Eerste Divisie	36	17
Vitesse	1987–88	Eerste Divisie	25	10
Vitesse	1988–89	Eerste Divisie	36	6
Vitesse	1989–90	Eredivisie	33	14
Vitesse	1990–91	Eredivisie	33	8
Vitesse	1991–92	Eredivisie	32	10
Vitesse	1992–93	Eredivisie	30	15
Ajax	1993–94	Eredivisie	27	2
Ajax	1994–95	Eredivisie	17	5
Istanbulspor	1995–96	1. Lig	22	3
Vitesse	1996–97	Eredivisie	28	5
Vitesse	1997–98	Eredivisie	15	1
Vitesse	1998–99	Eredivisie	26	1
Vitesse	1999–00	Eredivisie	24	6
Vitesse	2000–01	Eredivisie	6	0
De Graafschap	2000–01	Eredivisie	16	2
De Graafschap	2001–02	Eredivisie	23	2
De Graafschap	2002–03	Eredivisie	3	0
Total			432	107

=== International ===
Appearances and goals by national team and year
National team	Year	Apps	Goals
Netherlands	1990	1	0
Netherlands	1991	0	0
Netherlands	1992	0	0
Netherlands	1993	1	1
Total		2	1

Scores and results list the Netherlands' goal tally first, score column indicates score after each Van den Brom goal.

List of international goals scored by John van den Brom
No.	Date	Venue	Opponent	Score	Result	Competition
1	24 March 1993	Stadion Galgenwaard, Utrecht, Netherlands	San Marino	1–0	6–0	1994 FIFA World Cup qualification

== Managerial statistics ==
As of match played 22 November 2026

Managerial record by team and tenure
Team	Nat	From	To	Record				
Team	Nat	From	To	G	W	D	L	Win %
AGOVV	(Netherlands)	1 July 2007	30 June 2010	120	45	22	53	37.50
Den Haag	(Netherlands)	1 July 2010	29 June 2011	40	20	7	13	50.00
Vitesse	(Netherlands)	1 July 2011	30 May 2012	42	20	9	13	47.62
Anderlecht	(Belgium)	30 May 2012	9 April 2014	98	54	18	26	55.10
AZ	(Netherlands)	29 September 2014	30 June 2019	216	116	41	59	53.70
Utrecht	(Netherlands)	1 July 2019	9 November 2020	40	20	9	11	50.00
Genk	(Belgium)	9 November 2020	6 December 2021	65	30	13	22	46.15
Al-Taawoun	(Saudi Arabia)	31 March 2022	7 May 2022	7	2	1	4	28.57
Lech Poznań	(Poland)	19 June 2022	17 December 2023	82	41	23	18	50.00
Vitesse	(Netherlands)	1 July 2024	9 May 2025	39	11	11	17	28.21
Twente	(Netherlands)	15 September 2025	Present	54	29	17	8	53.70
Total				802	387	171	244	48.25

== Honours ==
=== As player ===
Vitesse

- Eerste Divisie: 1988–89

Ajax

- Eredivisie: 1993–94, 1994–95
- Dutch Supercup: 1993, 1994
- UEFA Champions League: 1994–95

=== As manager ===
Anderlecht

- Belgian Pro League: 2012–13
- Belgian Super Cup: 2012, 2013

Genk

- Belgian Cup: 2020–21

Individual

- Ekstraklasa Coach of the Month: September 2022
- Eredivisie Manager of the Month: February 2026
