= Stefan Pettersson (footballer) =

Swedish footballer (born 1963)

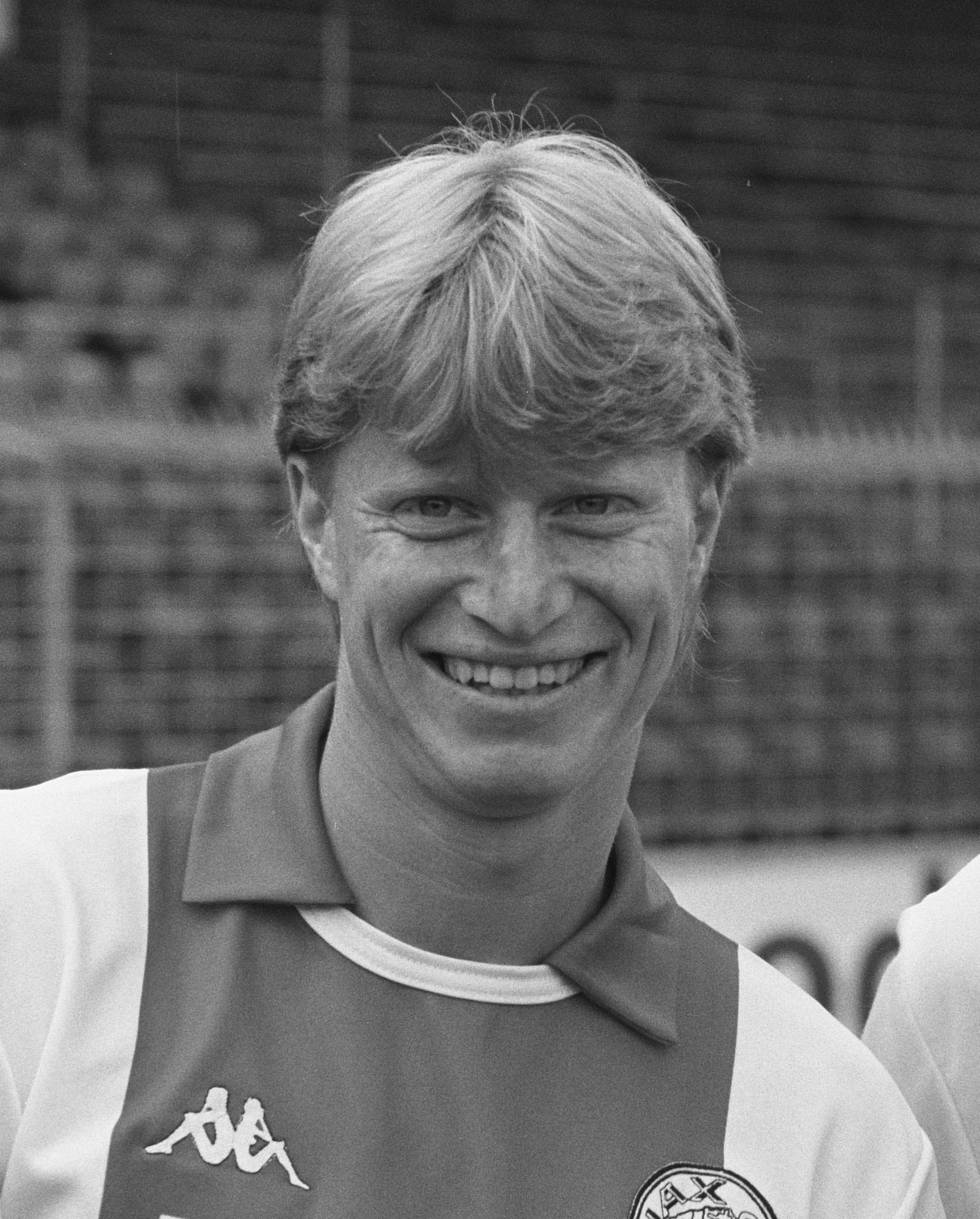
- Pettersson in 1988

Personal information
- Full name: Stefan Bengt Pettersson
- Date of birth: 22 March 1963 (age 63)
- Place of birth: Västerås, Sweden
- Height: 1.82 m (6 ft 0 in)
- Position: Striker

Youth career
- IFK Västerås

Senior career*
Years	Team	Apps	(Gls)
1980–1981	IFK Västerås	31	(4)
1982–1984	IFK Norrköping	46	(24)
1984–1988	IFK Göteborg	78	(31)
1988–1994	Ajax	151	(77)
1994–1998	IFK Göteborg	84	(28)
Total		390	(164)

International career
1979	Sweden U17	4	(1)
1980–1981	Sweden U19	12	(4)
1982–1985	Sweden U21	15	(1)
1983–1993	Sweden	31	(4)
- * Club domestic league appearances and goals

Stefan Bengt Pettersson (born 22 March 1963) is a Swedish former professional footballer who played as a striker. He won the UEFA Cup with both IFK Göteborg and Ajax, and won 31 caps for the Sweden national team. He represented his country at the 1990 FIFA World Cup.

== Club career ==
Pettersson was born and raised in Västerås, and started his football career with the local club IFK Västerås. He began his Allsvenskan career with IFK Norrköping, before leaving for IFK Göteborg during the 1984 season. The following four years he helped Göteborg win one league title, become runners-up once, and to one UEFA Cup victory in 1987, in which he scored in the final itself against Dundee United.

In 1988, he was bought by Dutch club AFC Ajax. In the six seasons he spent with Ajax he won the league twice and the Dutch Cup once. In 1992, he won the UEFA Cup again, also scoring in the final again, this time a penalty. He returned to IFK Göteborg in 1994 and won three more league titles. The latter part of his career he had recurring knee problems, which forced him to retire in 1999.

== International career ==
Pettersson represented the Sweden U17, U19, and U21 teams a total of 31 times between 1979 and 1985. He made his full international debut for Sweden on 19 November 1983 in a friendly 4–0 win against Barbados, playing for 65 minutes before being replaced by Mats Jingblad. He scored his first international goal for Sweden on 31 August 1988 in a friendly 1–2 loss against Denmark. He was selected for Sweden's squad for the 1990 FIFA World Cup and played in all three games as Sweden was eliminated after the group stage following three straight 1–2 losses against Brazil, Scotland, and Costa Rica.

Pettersson scored in a friendly against Poland ahead of UEFA Euro 1992, but was not selected for the tournament. He scored his first competitive goal for Sweden in a 1994 FIFA World Cup qualifier against Bulgaria, but was overlooked for the final tournament.

He won a total of 31 caps for Sweden, scoring four goals.

== Personal life ==
Pettersson is married to a sister of Jesper Parnevik.

== Career statistics ==
=== International ===
Appearances and goals by national team and year
National team	Year	Apps	Goals
Sweden	1983	1	0
Sweden	1984	1	0
Sweden	1985	2	0
Sweden	1986	1	0
Sweden	1987	5	0
Sweden	1988	4	1
Sweden	1989	1	0
Sweden	1990	9	0
Sweden	1991	0	0
Sweden	1992	5	3
Sweden	1993	2	0
Total		31	4

Scores and results list Sweden's goal tally first, score column indicates score after each Pettersson goal.

List of international goals scored by Stefan Pettersson
No.	Date	Venue	Opponent	Score	Result	Competition	Ref.
1	31 August 1988	Råsunda Stadium, Solna, Sweden	Denmark	1–2	1–2	Friendly	
2	7 May 1992	Råsunda Stadium, Solna, Sweden	Poland	5–0	5–0	Friendly	
3	26 August 1992	Ullevaal Stadion, Oslo, Norway	Norway	2–1	2–2	Friendly	
4	7 October 1992	Råsunda Stadium, Solna, Sweden	Bulgaria	2–0	2–0	1994 FIFA World Cup qualifier	

== Honours ==
IFK Göteborg

- UEFA Cup: 1986–87
- Allsvenskan: 1984, 1994, 1995, 1996

Ajax

- UEFA Cup: 1991–92
- Eredivisie: 1989–90, 1993–94
- KNVB Cup: 1992–93

Individual

- Pettersson was also given the "Folkets lirare" ("People's Choice Player") award at Fotbollsgalan in 1997.
- Årets Ärkeängel: 1987
