= Rob Delahaye =

Dutch footballer

Personal information
- Date of birth: 24 June 1959 (age 67)
- Place of birth: Houthem, Netherlands
- Height: 1.72 m (5 ft 8 in)

Youth career
- Mheerder Boys

Senior career*
Years	Team	Apps	(Gls)
1980–1995	MVV	412	(23)
1995–1998	Wiltz	50	(0)

Managerial career
- 1996–1998: Wiltz (player/coach)
- 2004: MVV (caretaker)
- 2007: MVV (caretaker)
- 2008: Odra Opole
- 2009–2010: Sportfreunde Siegen
- 2014: EHC
- * Club domestic league appearances and goals

Rob Delahaye (born 24 June 1959) is a Dutch retired footballer who played for MVV between 1980 and 1995, making over 400 appearances.

== Club career ==
Delahaye played his entire Dutch professional career for MVV which earned him the nickname Mr MVV. He finished his career abroad at FC Wiltz in Luxembourg.

== Managerial career ==
After retiring, Delahaye became an assistant coach at MVV, temporarily taking over as head coach after the dismissal of Jan van Deinsen in February 2004 and from Ron Elsen in April 2007. He also worked as a scout for the club. He was named manager of Polish second division side Odra Opole in January 2008, joining compatriot and club chairman Guido Vreuls. After a disappointing period in charge of German side Siegen, Delahaye expected to be welcomed back by MVV but they ended his lifelong contract with the club. He joined amateur side EHC as an assistant to coach Ole Tobiasen in 2013, only to take charge himself in January 2014 when Tobiasen was dismissed.

He was named coach of amateur team Geusselt Sport for the 2017–18 season.

He later worked as a waiter in the t Rozenhoedje bar and was a candidate for the 2026 Maastricht municipal elections on behalf of the Socially Active Citizens Party.
