= 1994 Dutch Supercup =

Ajax	Feyenoord
3	0
- Date: 21 August 1994
- Venue: Olympic Stadium, Amsterdam
- Referee: John Blankenstein
- Attendance: 23,500

The fifth edition of the Dutch Supercup was held on 21 August 1994 in the Olympic Stadium in Amsterdam. The match featured the winners of the 1993–94 Eredivisie, Ajax, and the winners of the 1993–94 KNVB Cup, Feyenoord. The game was won by Ajax 3–0, with the goals coming from Jari Litmanen, Tarik Oulida and Patrick Kluivert, the latter on his professional debut.

PTT (an acronym for Posterijen, Telegrafie en Telefonie (Dutch for Postoffice, Telegraph and Telephone)), had been the corporate sponsors since the re-inauguration of the Supercup in 1991, with the competition being known as the PTT Telecom Cup. However, they withdrew their sponsorship for the 1994 edition of the cup. This led to the name reverting to 'Dutch Supercup' (Dutch: Nederlandse Supercup), a name which was retained until 1996 when the competition became known as the Johan Cruyff Shield.

This would be the last Dutch Supercup to be played at the Olympic Stadium; in 1995, the games would be played at the De Kuip, with all subsequent cups, under the title of the Johan Cruyff Shield, being played at the Amsterdam Arena.

== Match details ==
21 August 1994

Ajax	3–0	Feyenoord
Litmanen 13'; Oulida 21'; Kluivert 25'

Olympic Stadium, Amsterdam
Attendance: 23,500
Referee: John Blankenstein (Den Haag)

Ajax
GK	1	(Netherlands) Edwin van der Sar
DF	2	(Netherlands) Michael Reiziger	Booked
DF	3	(Netherlands) Danny Blind (c)	Booked
DF	4	(Netherlands) Frank Rijkaard	Booked
DF	5	(Netherlands) Frank de Boer		(substituted off) 67'
MF	11	(Netherlands) Marc Overmars
MF	6	(Netherlands) Ronald de Boer
MF	10	(Finland) Jari Litmanen
MF	8	(Netherlands) Tarik Oulida
FW	7	(Nigeria) Finidi George
FW	9	(Netherlands) Patrick Kluivert
Substitutes:
	14	(Netherlands) Peter van Vossen		(substituted on) 67'
Manager:
		(Netherlands) Louis van Gaal

Feyenoord
GK	1	(Netherlands) Ed de Goey
DF	2	(Netherlands) Ulrich van Gobbel
DF	3	(Netherlands) Orlando Trustfull
DF	4	(Netherlands) Henk Fräser
DF	5	(Netherlands) Errol Refos	Booked
MF	6	(Netherlands) Peter Bosz (c)	Booked
MF	8	(Suriname) Dean Gorré
MF	10	(Netherlands) Rob Witschge
MF	7	(Netherlands) Gaston Taument		(substituted off) 72'
FW	9	(Sweden) Henrik Larsson
FW	11	(Netherlands) Regi Blinker
Substitutes:
	16	(Hungary) Joszef Kiprich		(substituted on) 72'
Manager:
		(Netherlands) Willem van Hanegem

Match rules

- 90 minutes.
- 30 minutes of extra time if necessary.
- Penalty shoot-out if scores still level.
- Five named substitutes
- Maximum of 3 substitutions.
