= Jari Litmanen =

Finnish footballer (born 1971)

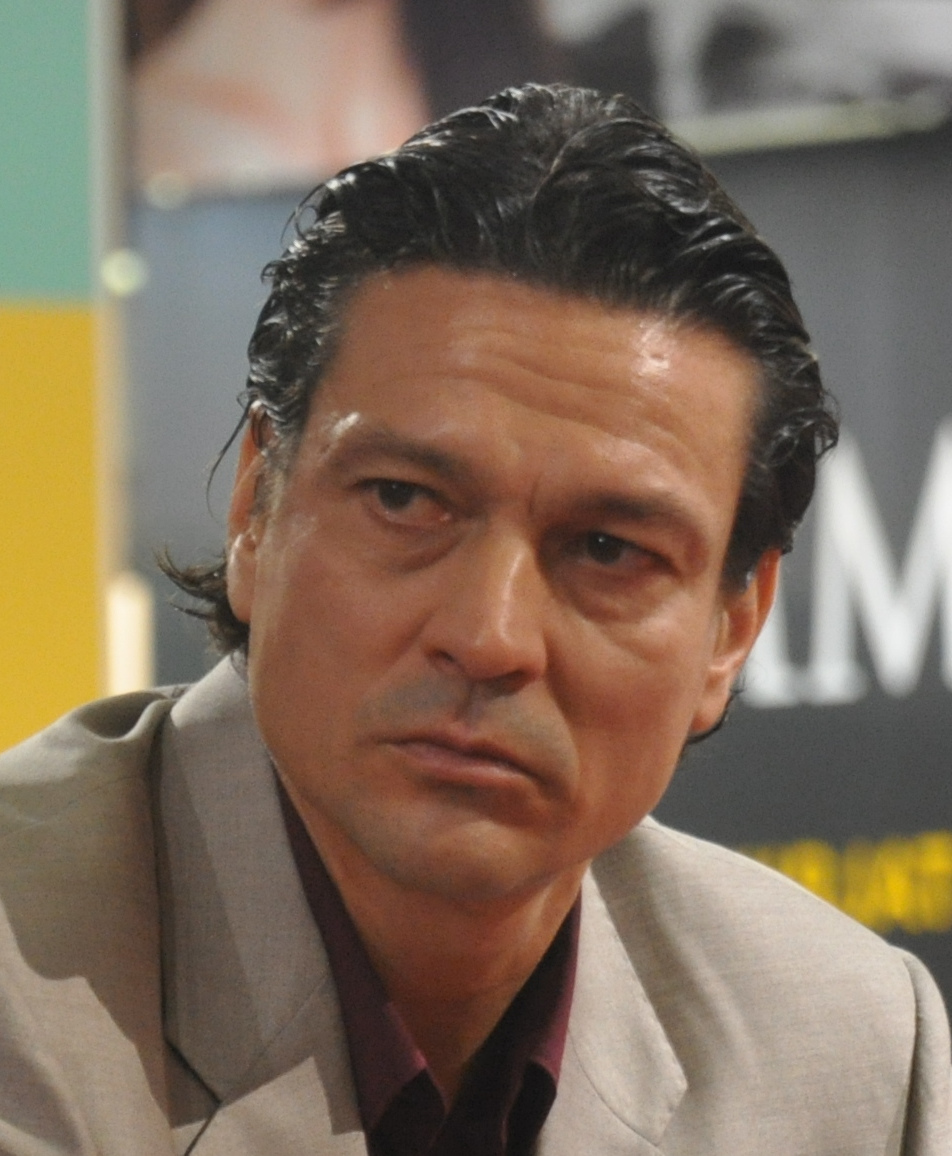
- Litmanen in 2015

Personal information
- Full name: Jari Olavi Litmanen
- Date of birth: 20 February 1971 (age 55)
- Place of birth: Lahti, Finland
- Height: 1.82 m (6 ft 0 in)
- Positions: Attacking midfielder; second striker

Team information
- Current team: Tallinna Kalev Juunior

Youth career
- 1977–1987: Reipas

Senior career*
Years	Team	Apps	(Gls)
1987–1990	Reipas	86	(28)
1991	HJK	27	(16)
1992	MyPa	18	(7)
1992–1999	Ajax	159	(91)
1999–2001	Barcelona	21	(3)
2001–2002	Liverpool	26	(5)
2002–2004	Ajax	20	(5)
2004	Lahti	11	(3)
2005	Hansa Rostock	13	(1)
2005–2007	Malmö FF	10	(3)
2008	Fulham	0	(0)
2008–2010	Lahti	40	(10)
2011	HJK	18	(1)
2025–	Tallinna Kalev Juunior	7	(2)
Total		453	(174)

International career
1989–2010	Finland	137	(32)
- * Club domestic league appearances and goals

Jari Olavi Litmanen (pronounced [ˈjɑri ˈlitmɑnen]; born 20 February 1971) is a Finnish former professional footballer who played as an attacking midfielder or a second striker. He was the first-choice captain of the Finland national team between 1996 and 2008 in an international career that ran from 1989 to 2010. Litmanen is widely considered to be Finland's greatest football player of all time. He was chosen as the best Finnish player of the last 50 years by the Football Association of Finland in the UEFA Jubilee Awards in November 2003. He also finished 42nd in the 100 Greatest Finns voting in 2004. The Association of Football Statisticians' (The AFS) compendium of 'Greatest Ever Footballers' listed Litmanen as the 53rd best footballer ever. Litmanen was inducted into the Finnish Football Hall of Fame in 2015.

In Finland, he is often called "Litti" (after his own surname), which dates from his early years, and is also known as "Kuningas" ("The King").

During his club career, Litmanen represented Reipas, HJK, MyPa and Lahti in Finland, and Ajax, Barcelona, Liverpool, Hansa Rostock and Malmö FF abroad. Once considered one of the best attacking midfielders in the world, he became the first Finnish footballing superstar while playing for Ajax in the mid-1990s, winning the Champions League in 1995, the peak year of his career.

His later career was marred by injuries, and he was unable to repeat the success of his Ajax years either at Barcelona or Liverpool, often finding himself on the bench, despite some impressive performances for the latter. Writing about Litmanen in 2009, Paul Simpson, former FourFourTwo editor, went as far as to assert that "his career has not been worthy of his talent".

In 2025, when Ajax was celebrating its 125th anniversary, the fans of the club voted Litmanen among the best 11 players in the club's entire history. He was also named the best midfielder of Ajax, per voting.

== Club career ==
=== Early career in Finland ===
Litmanen made his first-team debut for Reipas in Finland's then top division Mestaruussarja at the age of 16 in 1987. After four seasons with Reipas, he moved to HJK, Finland's biggest club, in 1991. A year later, he joined MyPa, where he was coached by Harri Kampman, who later introduced him to his agent, the late Heikki Marttinen. Litmanen did not win any medals in the Finnish league, but he did win the Finnish Cup with MyPa in July 1992 in a 2–0 win over FF Jaro in the final at the Helsinki Olympic Stadium. His performance in the cup final, including a goal, convinced a scout of Ajax that the club should sign him. "For me, he was the player," the scout later told Finnish television. His transfer took place during the same summer, and he did not complete the Finnish football season with MyPa.

Louis Van Gaal, the manager of Ajax at the time, later stated that Ajax paid a transfer fee of only £10,000 for Litmanen. However, the original fax document was later revealed in Finnish media, according to which the transfer fee was 100,000 + 800,000 Dutch guilder, which corresponds roughly to €550,000.

=== Ajax ===
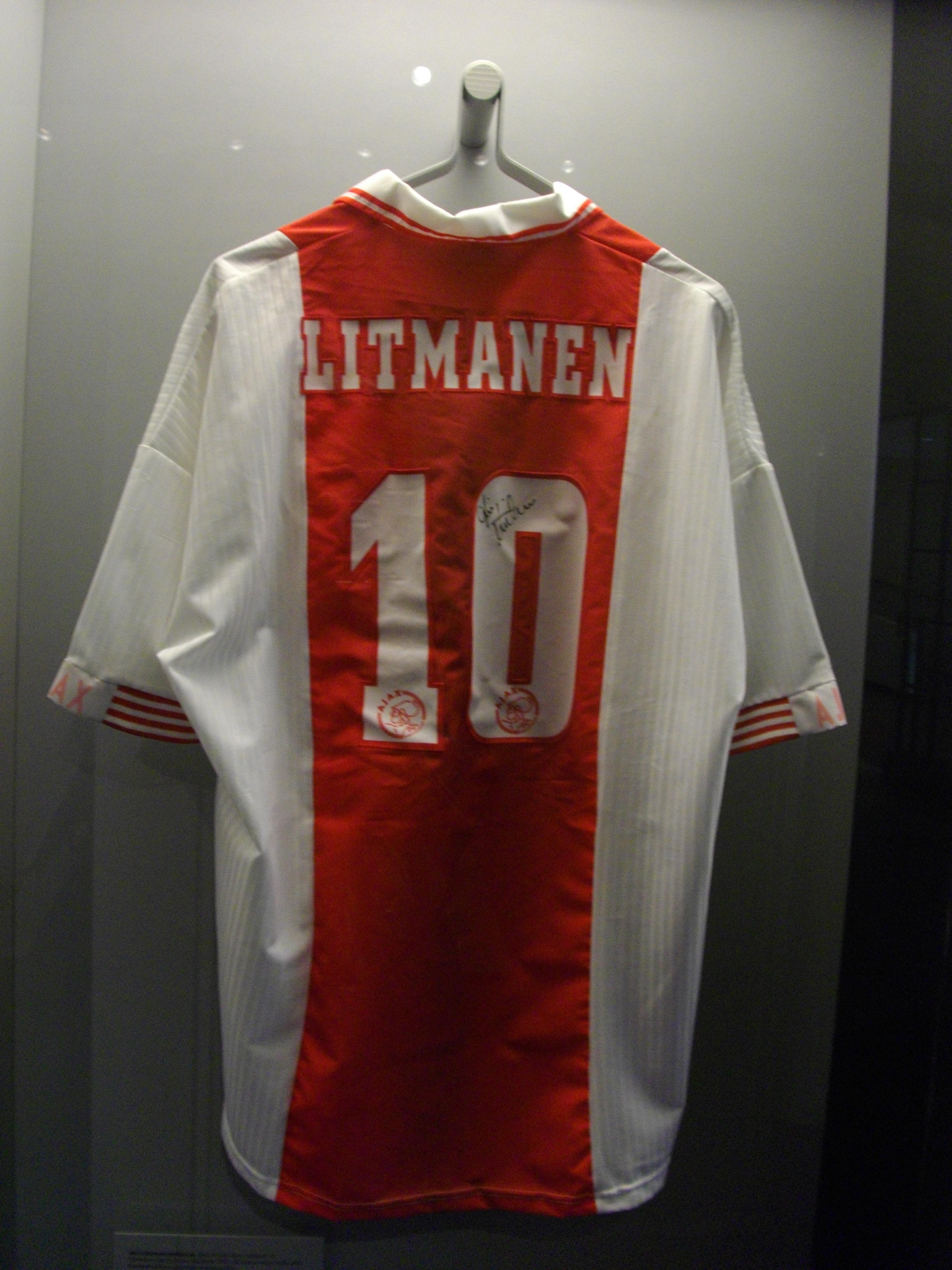
Jari Litmanen's Ajax shirt in the Sports Museum of Finland

Before his move to Ajax, Litmanen had failed to earn a contract with the Romanian club Dinamo București. A number of European clubs, including Barcelona, Leeds United and PSV, had shown an interest in him, but in the end it was Ajax that bought him.

David Endt, who was Ajax team manager in the 1990s, described his first impression of Litmanen to the Finnish broadcasting corporation YLE in 2010:

The press conference is over, and in comes Jari Litmanen, from behind the door. And I looked at his face and I looked at his eyes, and I recognised something in those eyes. And I thought, this is a man with a great willpower. Because he was not shy, not timid, but he was modest. He is not a man who will raise his voice, or bang with his fist on the table and say, 'We do it this way'. No, he was more of a diplomat, not wanting to be a leader, but being a leader. … He wanted to know everything about football, he was interested in every part of the game, and this gave him the nickname, within the team, we called him the 'Professor', because you could ask anything about football, and he would know the answer.

During 1992–93, his first season at Ajax, he played mostly in the reserves. Then Ajax manager Louis van Gaal was apparently not overly impressed with him, but the team physiotherapist suggested using him as a stand-in for Dennis Bergkamp, who was injured at the time. Van Gaal liked what he saw, and knowing that Bergkamp was about to leave for Inter, he announced that Litmanen would be Bergkamp's successor, something that people in Litmanen's native Finland found difficult to believe. This turned out to be true, however, and he inherited from Bergkamp the famous number 10 shirt, which is often given to playmakers. He went on to score 26 goals in the 1993–94 season, becoming the league's top scorer, and leading Ajax to the title. He was also voted Footballer of the Year in the Netherlands in 1993.

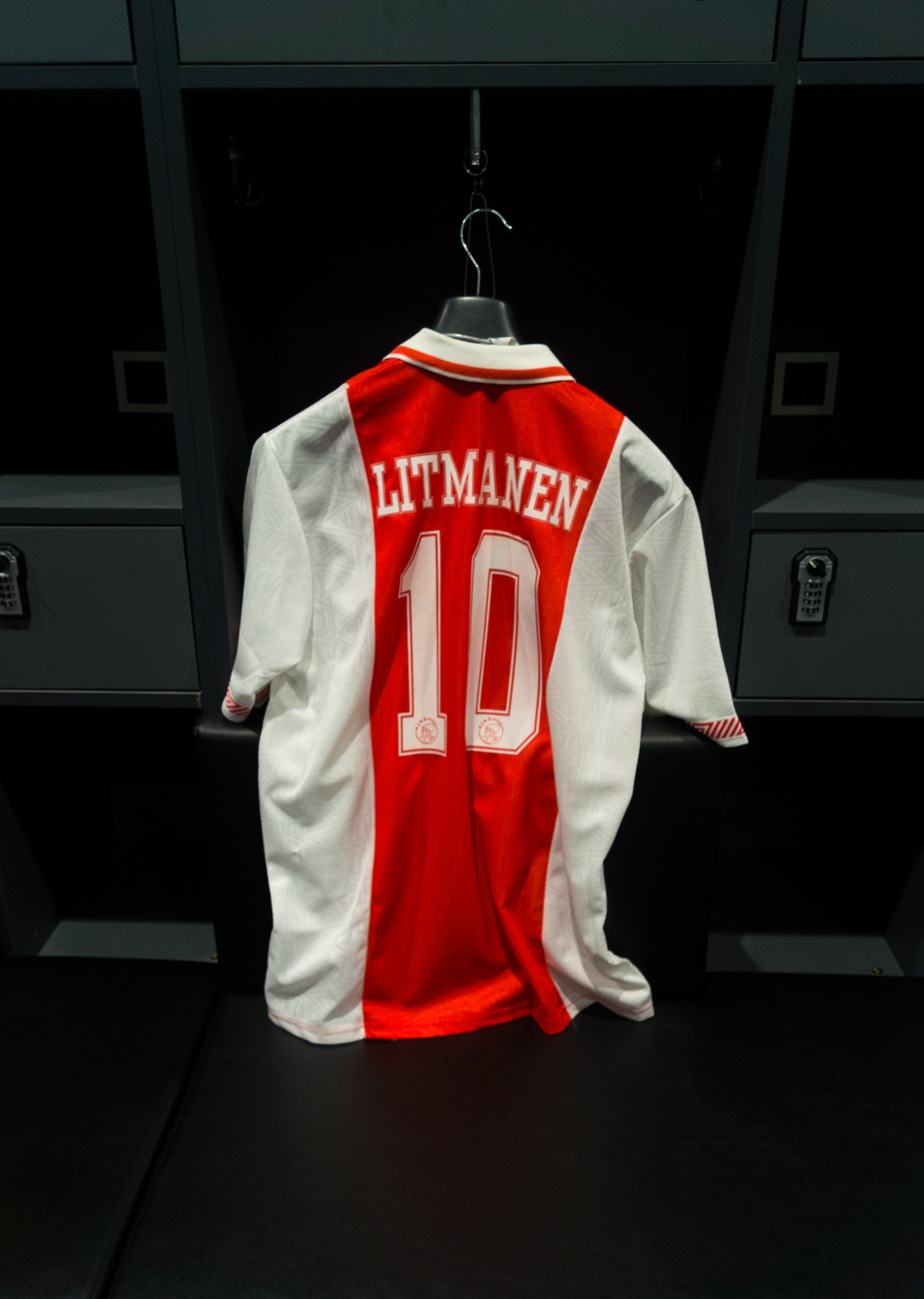
Jari Litmanen shirt in Vodafone Park, Istanbul

Litmanen was one of the star players of Van Gaal's team that won three consecutive Dutch championships and reached the UEFA Champions League final twice in a row. From the beginning of the 1994–95 season to the middle of the 1995–96 season, Ajax went undefeated in both the Eredivisie (a run of 52 games) and the Champions League (19 games). When Ajax beat Milan in the 1995 Champions League final, Litmanen became the first Finnish player to win the Champions League. In the 1995–96 edition of the Champions League, he was the Champions League top scorer with nine goals, including the equaliser in the final against Juventus, which Ajax lost on penalties. In 1995, he also won the Intercontinental Cup against Grêmio and came third in the voting for the Ballon d'Or (European Footballer of the Year), having finished eighth the previous year.

Litmanen spent seven years in Amsterdam, winning four Dutch championships and three KNVB Cups, and scored a total of 129 goals, 91 of them in the league. He is the club's top scorer in European competition with 26 goals in 54 matches (including two goals scored in the 2002–03 season). Litmanen has the honour of being one of just three players presented in a special video featurette at the Ajax Museum. The other two are Marco van Basten and Johan Cruyff. Frank Rijkaard, Litmanen's teammate in the 1993–94 and 1994–95 seasons, once said, "Dennis Bergkamp was brilliant for Ajax but the best No.10 we ever had was Jari." In his time at Ajax, some fans called him "Merlin" because of the magic he brought to the pitch.

But his proneness to injury also earned Litmanen the name "The Man of Glass", and injuries hampered his later seasons at Ajax causing him to miss many games (in his six seasons as a regular first-team player, he missed 57 out of a total of 204 league games, and in his last three seasons, he missed seven out of 24 European matches, playing only part of five others). His injury problems were to worsen as time passed, undermining his subsequent career.

=== Barcelona ===
In 1999, Litmanen was reunited with Louis van Gaal at Barcelona, one of several former Ajax players recruited by Van Gaal in his time as manager. Litmanen's stint with the club was largely plagued by injuries. An article in The Observer in April 2000 likened him to Pope John Paul II, in that he was "making few appearances and looking more frail each time".

Litmanen also failed to adapt to his new conditions, and he was one of the players dropped by Van Gaal that winter. Van Gaal later expressed his disappointment with Litmanen at Barcelona:

Players count for nothing, the team is everything. I set more store by a player's character than by his on-field qualities, and particularly whether he is willing to give everything to the cause. There are some incredibly talented players who haven't got the character or the personality to suit my methods. Litmanen, for example, was a different player at Barca than he was at Ajax. You have to adapt to a new culture when you move to a different club, and not every player is able to do that.

After an unsuccessful season, Van Gaal was replaced by Lorenzo Serra Ferrer, and Litmanen was frozen out of the team, losing the number 10 shirt to Rivaldo, although he remained at the club until January 2001, when he moved to Liverpool on a free transfer.

=== Liverpool ===
"We have signed a world-class player. He comes with a massive reputation and I believe he's one of the most exciting signings we have made," said Liverpool manager Gérard Houllier after the transfer had been completed. Litmanen also expressed his pleasure with the move: "It has always been my dream to play for Liverpool. I have supported them since I was a child and there has been talk about me joining them before." He wanted to wear the number seven shirt as worn by his boyhood hero Kenny Dalglish, but this had already been taken by Vladimír Šmicer. As shirt numbers 17 and 27 were also in use, he settled for the number 37.

Litmanen made a good start at Liverpool but broke his wrist playing for Finland against England at Anfield in late March 2001 and missed the rest of the season. Although he was part of the Liverpool team that won the treble of the League Cup, FA Cup and UEFA Cup in 2001, he missed all three finals because of injury. The following season, he was used sparingly by Houllier but did score goals against Tottenham Hotspur, Arsenal, Aston Villa and Fulham in the Premier League and against Dynamo Kyiv, Roma and Bayer Leverkusen in the Champions League.

According to his profile on LFCHistory.net, "Litmanen had difficulties in training due to his ankle problems and was hardly able to play for ninety minutes week in and week out." Litmanen himself was frustrated by his lack of playing time at Liverpool:

Litmanen was puzzled by Houllier's treatment of him. 'It's strange that he was so pleased when he signed me and then decided to not use me. I cannot explain it myself.' Houllier's explanations made his reasons even more puzzling. 'I let Jari go because I have always believed he had great potential which could benefit other teams. When we had some difficult moments, he was there for us, notably with goals against Fulham, Sunderland, AS Roma and in other crucial games. He had a lack of opportunities in the team but I really liked the reaction of the Ajax players towards Jari when I sold him!'

Litmanen was again given permission to move clubs for free after the 2001–02 season, having scored a total of 9 goals in 43 official matches during his one and a half seasons at the club.

=== Return to Ajax ===
Litmanen decided to return to Ajax, and was given a hero's welcome with the crowd again singing his name. He was one of the key players as Ajax reached the quarter-finals of the 2002–03 Champions League, but he continued to be plagued by injuries, and much of the following season was once again spent on the sidelines. In the spring of 2004, the club released him from his contract.

=== Lahti and Hansa Rostock ===
Litmanen's return to Finland, where he joined Lahti, was much hyped and was hailed as "the return of the king". Litmanen, however, moved to German Bundesliga strugglers Hansa Rostock in January 2005, but he was unable to prevent them being relegated, which ended his stint at the club.

=== Malmö FF ===
Litmanen joined the Swedish club Malmö FF in July 2005 in an attempt to help them qualify for the Champions League. This attempt, however, failed, and Litmanen himself was injured during the whole of the autumn, only making a few appearances. He decided to continue his career with Malmö in 2006 but was again sidelined with a number of injuries for much of the season. However, the matches he did play showed he remained a brilliant player when fit. After an operation to repair a damaged ankle during the winter break, Malmö decided to extend his contract over the 2007 season, but an ankle injury suffered in June 2007 forced Litmanen to cancel it.

=== Fulham ===
In January 2008, Litmanen received a ten-day trial invitation from Fulham under former Finland manager Roy Hodgson, and was signed on 31 January 2008 together with fellow countryman Toni Kallio. Just weeks after signing with Fulham, Litmanen had to return to his native Finland to rest, after serious heart concerns.

Litmanen eventually made his debut for Fulham in a reserve-team match against Tottenham on 31 March 2008, but he was released in May of the same year without playing a single game for the first team.

=== Return to Lahti ===
On 8 August 2008, it was announced that Litmanen would join his former club Lahti of the Finnish Premier Division for the remainder of the 2008 season. Although he only played 34 minutes in his first match, he scored twice and provided the passes for two other goals. He played an important role in helping Lahti to finish third in the league and qualify for Europe for the first time in the club's history. He signed a new one-year contract with Lahti on 16 April 2009. Litmanen scored his first European goal for Lahti in a 2–0 win against Gorica in the second qualifying round of the Europa League, with the final aggregate score being 2–1. This was his 30th goal in 83 European matches. On 18 September 2010, he scored a bicycle kick goal against Oulu in a 2–1 away victory.

On 23 October 2010, he scored his 50th Veikkausliiga goal, but this happened in a 3–2 defeat against TPS and didn't stop the club from being relegated to Ykkönen.

=== Return to HJK ===
On 20 April 2011, Litmanen signed a one-year contract with the reigning Finnish champions HJK at age 40, making him one of the few footballers to play at professional level in four different decades (1980s–2010s). He usually started as a substitute and played for 10–30 minutes. The HJK coach Antti Muurinen described Litmanen as something akin to a "precision munition" for HJK. He played in this role on 24 September 2011 in the Finnish Cup final against KuPS, coming on in the 80th minute when the score was 0–0. During the second half of extra time, he scored a spectacular half volley to make it 1–0 to HJK in the 108th minute. They went on to win the match 2–1. This was Litmanen's first Finnish Cup final after winning it with MyPa in 1992.

On 2 October 2011, HJK secured their third consecutive Finnish championship, thus winning the Double. As of that day, Litmanen had played 18 matches for HJK that season, and they had won every single match in which he had been on the field. On 14 October 2011, this run ended when HJK drew 0–0 with JJK Jyväskylä.

On 29 October 2011, Litmanen celebrated his 200th league match by giving three assists in HJK's 5–2 home win over Haka. It was also his last game of the season and would prove to be the last of his professional career.

=== Tallinna Kalev Juunior ===
In October 2025, Litmanen returned to playing, for Estonian fourth-tier club Tallinna Kalev Juunior. It is the reserve team of JK Tallinna Kalev, for whom Litmanen's sons Bruno (born 2007) and Caro (born 2005) are under contract. On 25 October 2025, Litmanen played alongside his sons in a 3–2 defeat against Tallinna Zapoos. He has also played for the club's third team.

== International career ==
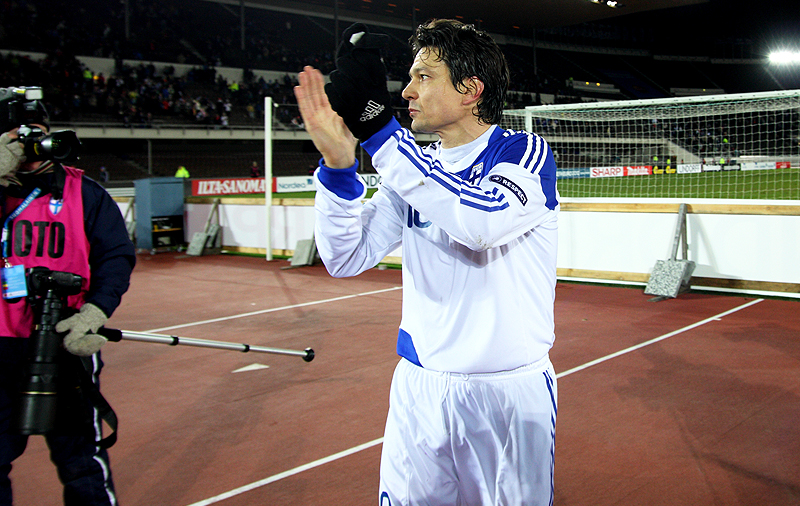
Litmanen after his last international against San Marino in November 2010

Litmanen is Finland's most capped player and was Finland's leading goalscorer until 12 October 2021, when Teemu Pukki broke the record with two goals against Kazakhstan in a World Cup qualifier. His international career ran for 21 years from 1989 to 2010.

Litmanen made his Finland debut on 22 October 1989 against Trinidad and Tobago, and scored his first goal on 16 May 1991 against Malta. Litmanen served as Finland's captain from 1996 to 2008, and was arguably their key player for more than a decade, helping the team to many unexpected victories against higher ranked opposition.

Litmanen earned his 100th cap on 25 January 2006 against South Korea, one of only four Finns to have reached such a milestone, the others being Ari Hjelm, Sami Hyypiä and Jonatan Johansson.

When he played for Finland against South Korea on 19 January 2010, Litmanen became one of a handful of male players to represent a national team in four different decades, a feat matched by Andorra's Ildefons Lima in June 2021.

On 17 November 2010, Litmanen became the oldest player ever to score for Finland – and also the oldest player overall to score a goal in the qualifying stages for the UEFA European Championship – when he netted a penalty in an 8–0 win over San Marino, which proved to be his last international match.

== Post-playing career ==
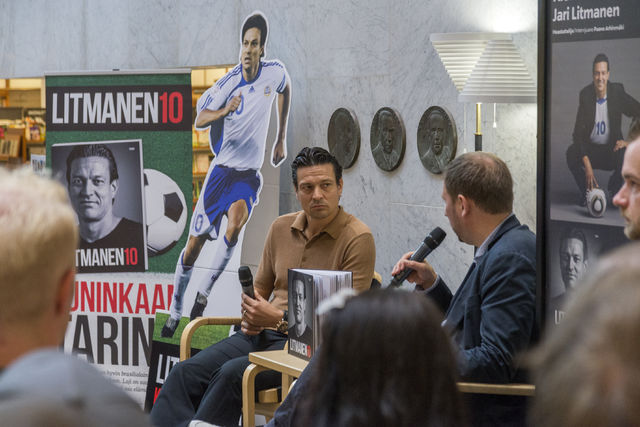
Paavo Arhinmäki interviews Litmanen at the time of announcing his autobiography book in 2015

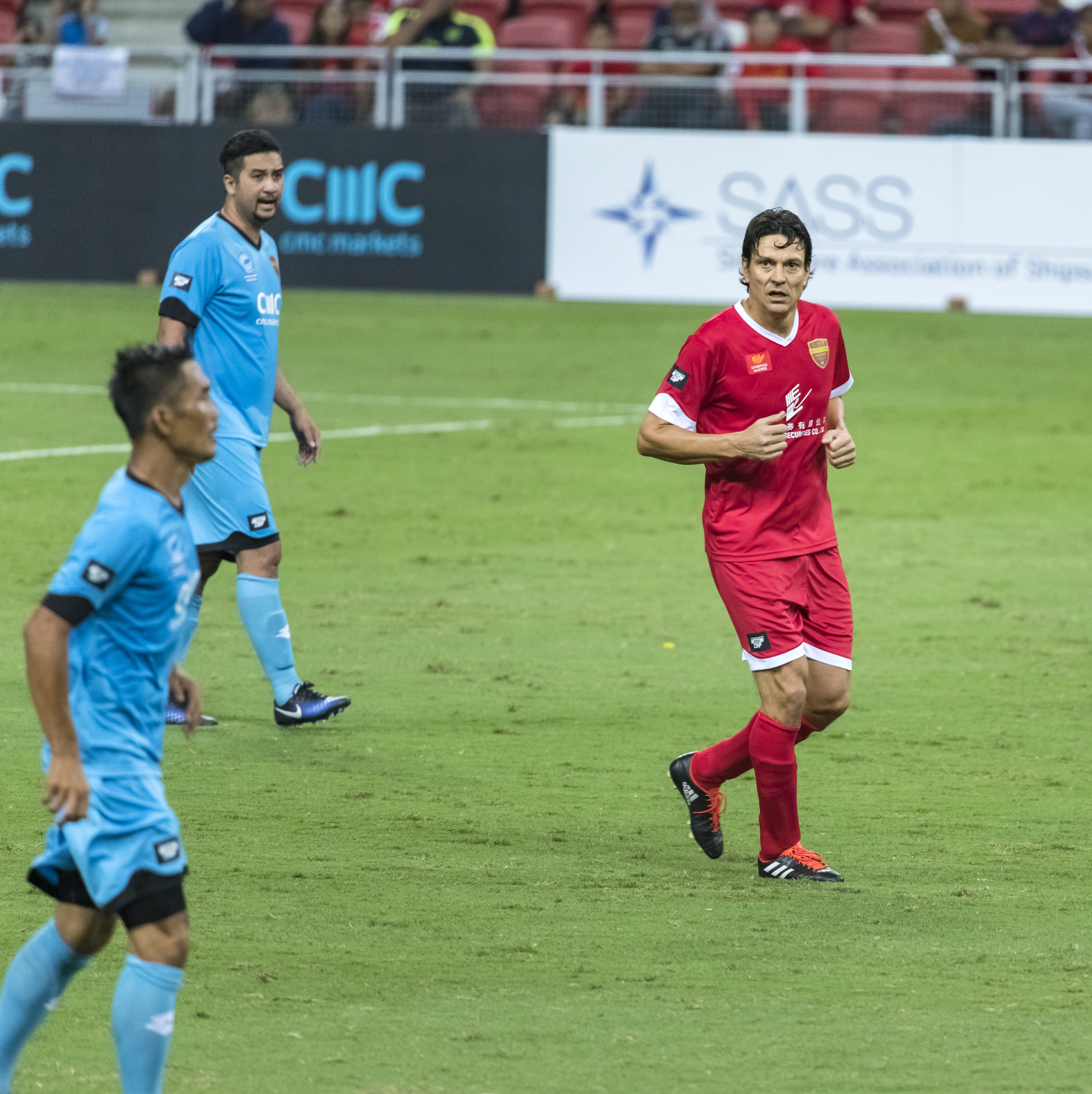
Litmanen playing in a friendly in 2017

In February 2011, the sports news programme Urheiluruutu of the Finnish Broadcasting Company YLE interviewed two of Litmanen's former teammates about the possibility of his working for Ajax when he decides to end his playing career. Former Ajax captain Danny Blind said the following:

Jari knows the door is always open for him as an assistant coach, as a youth coach, whatever in the club. We love Jari, and we know his qualities as a football player, but also as a coach, I think, so the door is always open for him.

Michel Kreek of the Ajax Academy was equally positive about this possibility:

It would be great if Jari would return here in Ajax. We played together, Jari came to Ajax when I played in the first team, and we saw him become a world player, so if that kind of player are willing to come back to Amsterdam, to Ajax, and put some of their experience into Ajax Academy, it’s only a great help for us.

He served as a TV pundit for YLE during Euro 1992, Euro 2012, World Cup 2014 and Euro 2016, and, during the latter, also wrote comment and analysis for the newspaper Ilta-Sanomat.

Jari Litmanen has confirmed in his autobiography that his professional career is over. He played his last professional game in 2011.

== Personal life ==
Litmanen was born into a footballing family. His father, Olavi Litmanen, was also a Finnish international and a Reipas player. His mother also played for Reipas at the women's highest level.

Litmanen became a father in November 2005 when his Estonian girlfriend Ly Jürgenson gave birth to a son named Caro. The couple's second son, Bruno, was born in September 2007. Although they avoid too much publicity, they are sometimes seen together in public.

On 10 October 2010, Litmanen became the first Finnish team sport player to be honoured with a statue: it stands at Kisapuisto (Lahti) where he started his career in the 1970s. The King – Jari Litmanen is a 2012 documentary film about Litmanen's career.

In late September 2019, Litmanen provoked controversy in Finland with his positive comments on the future 2022 FIFA World Cup and Qatar. Later Litmanen explained that his comments were targeted only to football conditions and infrastructure, and said that according to freedom of speech, he has a right to express his personal opinion.

On 11 May 2020, Litmanen said to Unibet that his coronavirus test was positive, and he had been recovering for four weeks. He said of this time that "I've probably never been in such bad shape".

=== Influence in the Netherlands ===
Since the 1990s, name Jari has been a popular first name for newborns in the Netherlands and also in Belgium, due to Litmanen's influence. As of 2017, there were 2,188 people named Jari in the country, including professional footballers Jari Oosterwijk, Jari Vandeputte, Jari Schuurman, Jari Vlak and Jari De Busser. At the end of the 1990s, Jari was occasionally more popular name in the Netherlands than in Finland.

== Career statistics ==
=== Club ===
Appearances and goals by club, season and competition
Club	Season	League			Cup		Continental		Other		Total	
Club	Season	Division	Apps	Goals	Apps	Goals	Apps	Goals	Apps	Goals	Apps	Goals
Reipas Lahti	1987	Mestaruussarja	9	0	1	0	—		—		10	0
Reipas Lahti	1988	Mestaruussarja	26	8	4	0	—		—		30	8
Reipas Lahti	1989	Mestaruussarja	25	6	4	2	—		—		29	8
Reipas Lahti	1990	Veikkausliiga	26	14	3	0	—		—		29	14
Reipas Lahti	Total		86	28	12	2	0	0	0	0	98	30
HJK Helsinki	1991	Veikkausliiga	27	16	0	0	2	0	—		29	16
MyPa	1992	Veikkausliiga	18	7	6	4	—		—		24	11
Ajax	1992–93	Eredivisie	12	1	1	0	1	0	0	0	14	1
Ajax	1993–94	Eredivisie	30	26	3	4	5	4	1	2	39	36
Ajax	1994–95	Eredivisie	27	17	4	2	11	6	1	1	43	26
Ajax	1995–96	Eredivisie	26	14	2	0	12	9	0	0	40	23
Ajax	1996–97	Eredivisie	16	6	1	0	7	2	1	0	25	8
Ajax	1997–98	Eredivisie	25	16	3	4	6	2	0	0	34	22
Ajax	1998–99	Eredivisie	23	11	5	1	4	1	1	0	33	13
Ajax	Total		159	91	19	11	46	24	4	3	228	129
Barcelona	1999–2000	La Liga	21	3	2	1	8	0	1	0	32	4
Barcelona	2000–01	La Liga	0	0	0	0	0	0	—		0	0
Barcelona	Total		21	3	2	1	8	0	1	0	32	4
Liverpool	2000–01	Premier League	5	1	2	1	2	0	2	0	11	2
Liverpool	2001–02	Premier League	21	4	1	0	9	3	1	0	32	7
Liverpool	Total		26	5	3	1	11	3	3	0	43	9
Ajax	2002–03	Eredivisie	14	5	1	0	7	2	0	0	22	7
Ajax	2003–04	Eredivisie	6	0	0	0	3	0	0	0	9	0
Ajax	Total		20	5	1	0	10	2	0	0	31	7
Lahti	2004	Veikkausliiga	11	3	1	0	1	0	—		13	3
Hansa Rostock	2004–05	Bundesliga	13	1	1	0	0	0	0	0	14	1
Malmö FF	2005	Allsvenskan	2	1		0	2	0	—		4	1
Malmö FF	2006	Allsvenskan	8	2		0	—		—		8	2
Malmö FF	2007	Allsvenskan	0	0			—		—		0	0
Malmö FF	Total		10	3			2	0	0	0	12	3
Fulham	2007–08	Premier League	0	0	0	0	—		0	0	0	0
Lahti	2008	Veikkausliiga	6	3	0	0	—		0	0	6	3
Lahti	2009	Veikkausliiga	13	2	2	0	6	1	3	1	24	4
Lahti	2010	Veikkausliiga	21	5	0	0	—		2	0	23	5
Lahti	Total		40	10	2	0	6	1	5	1	53	12
HJK Helsinki	2011	Veikkausliiga	18	1	1	1	2	0	1	0	22	2
Career total			449	173	48	20	15	4	87	30	599	227

- Finnish League Cup held for the first time in 1994.

=== International ===
Appearances and goals by national team and year
National team	Year	Apps	Goals
Finland	1989	2	0
Finland	1990	7	0
Finland	1991	7	1
Finland	1992	8	1
Finland	1993	8	1
Finland	1994	6	2
Finland	1995	4	2
Finland	1996	2	1
Finland	1997	7	4
Finland	1998	6	1
Finland	1999	3	0
Finland	2000	8	4
Finland	2001	6	2
Finland	2002	7	2
Finland	2003	3	1
Finland	2004	9	2
Finland	2005	5	1
Finland	2006	8	3
Finland	2007	4	0
Finland	2008	8	2
Finland	2009	11	1
Finland	2010	8	1
Total		137	32

Win Draw Loss

List of international goals scored by Jari Litmanen
No.	Date	Home team	Visiting team	Goals	Score	Result	Venue	Competition
1.	16 May 1991	Finland	Malta	87' 2–0	2–0	Win	Helsinki Olympic Stadium	UEFA Euro 1992 qualifying
2.	25 March 1992	Scotland	Finland	41' 1–1	1–1	Draw	Hampden Park, Glasgow	Friendly
3.	13 October 1993	Sweden	Finland	60' 3–2	3–2	Loss	Råsunda Stadium, Stockholm	1994 FIFA World Cup qualification
4.	16 November 1994	Finland	Faroe Islands	53' 2–0; 72' 3–0	5–0	Win	Helsinki Olympic Stadium	UEFA Euro 1996 qualifying
5.	16 November 1994	Finland	Faroe Islands	53' 2–0; 72' 3–0	5–0	Win	Helsinki Olympic Stadium	UEFA Euro 1996 qualifying
6.	29 March 1995	San Marino	Finland	45' 0–1	0–2	Win	Stadio Olimpico, Serravalle	UEFA Euro 1996 qualifying
7.	11 June 1995	Finland	Greece	45+1' 1–1 (pen.)	2–1	Win	Helsinki Olympic Stadium	UEFA Euro 1996 qualifying
8.	2 June 1996	Finland	Turkey	25' 1–0	1–2	Loss	Helsinki Olympic Stadium	Friendly
9.	2 February 1997	Turkey	Finland	17' 0–1	1–1	Draw	Atatürk Stadium, Denizli	Friendly
10.	2 April 1997	Azerbaijan	Finland	26' 0–1	1–2	Win	Tofik Bakhramov Stadium, Baku	1998 FIFA World Cup qualification
11.	8 June 1997	Finland	Azerbaijan	65' 2–0	3–0	Win	Helsinki Olympic Stadium	1998 FIFA World Cup qualification
12.	6 September 1997	Switzerland	Finland	16' 0–1	1–2	Win	Stade Olympique de la Pontaise, Lausanne	1998 FIFA World Cup qualification
13.	14 October 1998	Turkey	Finland	90+6' 1–3	1–3	Win	Ali Sami Yen Stadium, Istanbul	UEFA Euro 2000 qualifying
14.	29 March 2000	Wales	Finland	21' 0–1	1–2	Win	Millennium Stadium, Cardiff	Friendly
15.	16 August 2000	Finland	Norway	24' 1–0; 61' 2–1	3–1	Win	Finnair Stadium, Helsinki	2000–01 Nordic Football Championship
16.	16 August 2000	Finland	Norway	24' 1–0; 61' 2–1	3–1	Win	Finnair Stadium, Helsinki	2000–01 Nordic Football Championship
17.	2 September 2000	Finland	Albania	45' 1–0	2–1	Win	Finnair Stadium, Helsinki	2002 FIFA World Cup qualification
18.	15 August 2001	Finland	Belgium	3–0 (pen.)	4–1	Win	Helsinki Olympic Stadium	Friendly
19.	5 September 2001	Finland	Greece	53' 5–1	5–1	Win	Helsinki Olympic Stadium	2002 FIFA World Cup qualification
20.	27 March 2002	Portugal	Finland	41' 1–3; 53' 1–4	1–4	Win	Estádio do Bessa, Porto	Friendly
21.	27 March 2002	Portugal	Finland	41' 1–3; 53' 1–4	1–4	Win	Estádio do Bessa, Porto	Friendly
22.	30 April 2003	Finland	Iceland	55' 1–0 (pen.)	3–0	Win	Pohjola Stadion, Myyrmäki, Vantaa	Friendly
23.	31 April 2004	Malta	Finland	86' 0–2	1–2	Win	Ta' Qali National Stadium, Valletta	Friendly
24.	28 May 2004	Finland	Sweden	8' 1–0 (pen.)	1–3	Loss	Ratina Stadion, Tampere	Friendly
25.	26 March 2005	Czech Republic	Finland	46' 2–1	4–3	Loss	Na Stinadlech, Teplice	2006 FIFA World Cup qualification
26.	2 September 2006	Poland	Finland	54' 0–1; 76' 0–2 (pen.)	1–3	Win	Zdzisław Krzyszkowiak, Bydgoszcz	UEFA Euro 2008 qualifying
27.	2 September 2006	Poland	Finland	54' 0–1; 76' 0–2 (pen.)	1–3	Win	Zdzisław Krzyszkowiak, Bydgoszcz	UEFA Euro 2008 qualifying
28.	11 October 2006	Kazakhstan	Finland	29' 0–1	0–2	Win	Almaty Central Stadium, Almaty	UEFA Euro 2008 qualifying
29.	6 February 2008	Finland	Greece	66' 1–0	1–2	Loss	Neo GSP Stadium, Nicosia	Friendly
30.	26 March 2008	Bulgaria	Finland	22' 0–1 (pen.)	2–1	Loss	Vasil Levski National Stadium, Sofia	Friendly
31.	9 September 2009	Liechtenstein	Finland	74' 0–1 (pen.)	1–1	Draw	Rheinpark Stadion, Vaduz	2010 FIFA World Cup qualification
32.	17 November 2010	Finland	San Marino	71' 6–0 (pen.)	8–0	Win	Helsinki Olympic Stadium	UEFA Euro 2012 qualifying

== Honours ==
MyPa

- Finnish Cup: 1992

Ajax

- Eredivisie: 1993–94, 1994–95, 1995–96, 1997–98, 2003–04
- KNVB Cup: 1992–93, 1997–98, 1998–99
- Dutch Supercup: 1993, 1994, 1995
- UEFA Champions League: 1994–95; runner-up: 1995–96
- UEFA Super Cup: 1995
- Intercontinental Cup: 1995

Liverpool

- FA Cup: 2000–01
- Football League Cup: 2000–01
- FA Charity Shield: 2001
- UEFA Cup: 2000–01
- UEFA Super Cup: 2001

HJK

- Veikkausliiga: 2011
- Finnish Cup: 2011

Finland

- Nordic Football Championship: 2000–01

Individual

- Finnish Sports Journalists Player of the Year (8): 1990, 1992, 1993, 1994, 1995, 1996, 1997, 1998
- Finnish Football Association Player of the Year (9): 1990, 1992, 1993, 1994, 1995, 1996, 1997, 1998, 2000
- Veikkausliiga Player of the Year: 1990
- Dutch Footballer of the Year: 1993
- Dutch league top scorer: 1993–94 (26 goals)
- Ballon d'Or: 1994 (8th), 1995 (3rd)
- Finnish Sports Personality of the Year: 1995
- Football Association of Finland: Captain's Ball 2002
- ESM Team of the Year: 1994–95, 1995–96
- UEFA Champions League top scorer: 1995–96 (9 goals)
- Captain's Ball: 2002
- UEFA Jubilee Awards – Greatest Finnish Footballer of the last 50 Years: 2003
- Most-capped player for the Finland national team: 137 caps
- 2nd all-time top scorer for the Finland national team: 32 goals
- All-time top scorer in Europe for Ajax: 26 goals
- Oldest Player to Score in UEFA European Championship qualifying: 39 years and 270 days
- FC Lahti Hall of Fame: 2016

== See also ==
- List of men's footballers with 100 or more international caps

Sporting positions
Preceded by Ari Hjelm	Finland football captain 1996–2008	Succeeded by Sami Hyypiä
