= Danny Blind =

Dutch footballer and manager

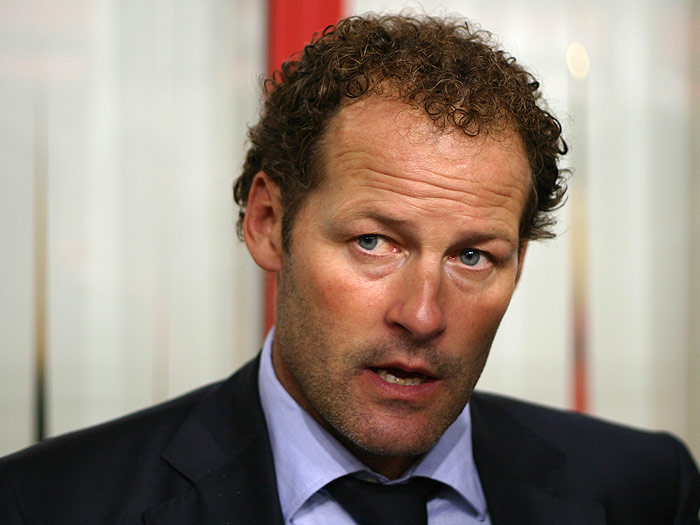

Personal information
- Full name: Dirk Franciscus Blind
- Date of birth: 1 August 1961 (age 65)
- Place of birth: Oost-Souburg, Netherlands
- Height: 1.76 m (5 ft 9 in)
- Position: Defender

Senior career*
Years	Team	Apps	(Gls)
1979–1986	Sparta Rotterdam	165	(18)
1986–1999	Ajax	372	(27)
Total		537	(45)

International career
1986–1996	Netherlands	42	(1)

Managerial career
- 2005–2006: Ajax
- 2015–2017: Netherlands
Medal record
Representing Netherlands
UEFA European Championship
Third place	1992
- * Club domestic league appearances and goals

Dirk Franciscus "Danny" Blind (Dutch pronunciation: [ˈdɪr(ə)k frɑnˈsɪskʏz ˈdɛni ˈblɪnt]; born 1 August 1961) is a Dutch former football player and coach. He played as a defender for Sparta Rotterdam, Ajax and the Netherlands national team. As coach he has managed Ajax and the Netherlands national team.

He is one of only two Dutch players, together with Arnold Mühren, to have won three different UEFA club competitions: Champions League, Cup Winners' Cup and UEFA Cup.

== Playing career ==
=== Club career ===
Blind made his professional football debut on 29 August 1979 with Sparta Rotterdam. He stayed under contract with Sparta for seven seasons when in July 1986 he transferred to Ajax, attracted there by manager Johan Cruyff. Blind's signing, however, was much to the chagrin of Ajax superstar Marco van Basten, who was upset that his manager had brought in a relatively unknown, defensive player, instead of investing on a big-name transfer. With Ajax, Blind amassed an impressive trophy list, winning all three European trophies (UEFA Cup Winners' Cup in 1987, the UEFA Cup in 1992 and the UEFA Champions League in 1995). He also secured the Intercontinental Cup in 1995 against Brazil's Grêmio by scoring the winning penalty in the penalty shoot-out.

Blind was again a penalty hero when he converted twice against Real Zaragoza in the European Super Cup final of 1995, which Ajax won 5–1 over the two legs. The two penalties Blind converted were in the 65th and 69th minutes of the second leg.

Domestically, with Ajax, he won five Dutch Eredivisie Championships and four national cups. He retired on 16 May 1999.

Blind was known for being a dependable defender and a leader on the field. Whilst famous for being a centre back, Blind started his career as a right full-back.

=== International career ===
Blind gained 42 caps for the Netherlands over a ten-year period, scoring once against Greece in a UEFA Euro 1992 qualifier. He made his debut in 1986 against Scotland but was not capped at all in 1987 or 1988, an absence which meant he missed being a part of the triumphant UEFA Euro 1988 side. He was a member of the Dutch squads at the 1990 and 1994 World Cups and the 1992 and 1996 European Championships, although he only played at the latter. Blind retired from international football after UEFA Euro 1996.

== Management career ==
Blind was head coach at Ajax from 14 March 2005 (appointed as successor to Ronald Koeman) until 10 May 2006, after only 422 days in charge. He led Ajax to victory in the KNVB Cup and the Johan Cruyff Shield.

In 2007–08, Blind became director of football at his old club, Sparta Rotterdam. On 15 May 2008, he returned to Ajax to become the new director of football in Amsterdam but switched roles to assistant coach when Martin Jol joined the club as manager. Returning to the position of technical director for Ajax at the beginning of the 2011–12 season, on 9 February 2012 it was announced that Blind would retire from his duties as technical director at Ajax, concluding a heated dispute surrounding the club's board of directors.

On 1 July 2015, Blind was named Guus Hiddink's successor as head coach of the Netherlands national team. He failed to lead them to Euro 2016, and he put the 2018 World Cup qualifying campaign at stake after more meagre results. He was sacked by the Dutch FA on 26 March 2017, the day after losing 2–0 away at Bulgaria, which left their chances of qualification in serious doubt.

On 4 August 2021, Blind returned to the Netherlands national team as assistant to Louis van Gaal. He left together with Van Gaal after 2022 FIFA World Cup.

== Personal life ==
Blind is the father of professional footballer Daley Blind, who has played for Ajax and Manchester United. His son is also a Dutch international, and is one of their ten most featured players of all time with over 100 caps.

== Career statistics ==
=== Club ===
Appearances and goals by club, season and competition
Club	Season	League			KNVB Cup		Europe		Total	
Club	Season	Division	Apps	Goals	Apps	Goals	Apps	Goals	Apps	Goals
Sparta Rotterdam	1979–80	Eredivisie	13	0	2	0	–		15	0
Sparta Rotterdam	1980–81	Eredivisie	10	0	0	0	–		10	0
Sparta Rotterdam	1981–82	Eredivisie	10	2	2	0	–		12	2
Sparta Rotterdam	1982–83	Eredivisie	34	3	1	0	–		35	3
Sparta Rotterdam	1983–84	Eredivisie	34	5	3	0	6	0	43	5
Sparta Rotterdam	1984–85	Eredivisie	30	3	4	0	–		34	3
Sparta Rotterdam	1985–86	Eredivisie	34	5	1	0	4	0	39	5
Sparta Rotterdam	Total		165	18	13	0	10	0	188	18
Ajax	1986–87	Eredivisie	29	4	5	0	7	0	41	4
Ajax	1987–88	Eredivisie	31	0	1	0	8	1	40	1
Ajax	1988–89	Eredivisie	30	2	3	0	–		33	2
Ajax	1989–90	Eredivisie	34	0	4	0	–		38	0
Ajax	1990–91	Eredivisie	34	2	3	0	–		37	2
Ajax	1991–92	Eredivisie	30	2	3	1	12	1	45	4
Ajax	1992–93	Eredivisie	28	4	5	0	8	0	41	4
Ajax	1993–94	Eredivisie	30	1	4	3	6	0	40	4
Ajax	1994–95	Eredivisie	34	5	3	0	10	0	49	5
Ajax	1995–96	Eredivisie	31	3	1	0	8	0	40	3
Ajax	1996–97	Eredivisie	16	0	0	0	5	0	21	0
Ajax	1997–98	Eredivisie	26	1	4	1	7	0	37	2
Ajax	1998–99	Eredivisie	19	3	2	0	3	0	24	3
Ajax	Total		372	27	38	5	84	2	494	34
Career total			537	45	51	5	94	2	682	52

=== International ===
Appearances and goals by national team and year
National team	Year	Apps	Goals
Netherlands	1986	3	0
Netherlands	1987	0	0
Netherlands	1988	0	0
Netherlands	1989	1	0
Netherlands	1990	5	0
Netherlands	1991	6	1
Netherlands	1992	6	0
Netherlands	1993	1	0
Netherlands	1994	6	0
Netherlands	1995	8	0
Netherlands	1996	6	0
Total		42	1

Scores and results list the Netherlands' goal tally first, score column indicates score after each Blind goal.

List of international goals scored by Danny Blind
No.	Date	Venue	Opponent	Score	Result	Competition
1	4 December 1991	Kaftanzoglio Stadium, Thessaloniki, Greece	Greece	2–0	2–0	UEFA Euro 1992 qualification

== Managerial statistics ==
As of match played 25 March 2017

Managerial record by team and tenure
Team	Nat	From	To	Record							
Team	Nat	From	To	G	W	D	L	GF	GA	GD	Win %
Ajax	(Netherlands)	15 March 2005	10 May 2006	64	38	10	16	133	74	+59	59.38
Netherlands	(Netherlands)	1 July 2015	26 March 2017	17	7	3	7	26	25	+1	41.18
Total				81	45	13	23	159	99	+60	55.56

== Honours ==
=== Player ===
Ajax

- Eredivisie: 1989–90, 1993–94, 1994–95, 1995–96, 1997–98
- KNVB Cup: 1986-87, 1992-93, 1997-98, 1998-99
- Johan Cruyff Shield: 1993, 1994, 1995
- UEFA Champions League: 1994-95
- UEFA Cup Winners' Cup: 1986-87
- UEFA Cup: 1991-92
- UEFA Super Cup: 1995
- Intercontinental Cup: 1995

Individual

- Dutch Golden Shoe: 1995, 1996
- ESM Team of the Year: 1994–95, 1995–96
- Intercontinental Cup Most Valuable Player of the Match Award: 1995

=== Manager ===
Ajax

- KNVB Cup: 2006
- Johan Cruyff Shield: 2005

== See also ==
- List of European association football families
- List of players to have won all international club competitions
- List of players to have won the three main European club competitions
