= 1993 Dutch Supercup =

1993 PTT Telecom Cup
Feyenoord	Ajax
0	4
- Date: 8 August 1993
- Venue: De Kuip, Rotterdam
- Referee: John Blankenstein
- Attendance: 28,750

The 1993 Dutch Supercup (Dutch: Nederlandse Supercup), known as the PTT Telecom Cup for sponsorship reasons, was the fourth Supercup match in Dutch football. The game was held on 8 August 1993 at De Kuip in Rotterdam. The match was played between 1992–93 Eredivisie winners Feyenoord, and 1992–93 KNVB Cup winners Ajax. The game ended with a 4–0 victory for Ajax.

== Match ==
8 August 1993

Feyenoord	0–4	Ajax
		Litmanen 18', 62'; F. de Boer 47'; Overmars 61'

De Kuip, Rotterdam
Attendance: 28750
Referee: John Blankenstein

Feyenoord	Ajax
