= 1992–93 KNVB Cup =

Tournament details
- Country: Netherlands
- Teams: 63

Final positions
- Champions: Ajax
- Runners-up: sc Heerenveen

Tournament statistics
- Top goal scorer(s): Edgar Davids (5 goals)

The 1992-93 KNVB Cup was the 75th edition of the Dutch national football annual knockout tournament for the KNVB Cup. 63 teams contested, beginning on 29 August 1992 and ending at the final on 20 May 1993.

Ajax beat sc Heerenveen 6–2 and won the cup for the twelfth time.

== Teams ==
- All 18 participants of the Eredivisie 1992-93, eleven of which entering in the third round, the rest entering in the second round
- All 18 participants of the Eerste Divisie 1992-93, entering in the second round
- 27 teams from lower (amateur) leagues, seven of which entering in the second round

== First round ==
The matches of the first round were played on 29-30 August 1992. Only amateur clubs participated.

Home team	Result	Away team
DETO	2–0	SV De Valleivogels
DVS '33	1–4	VV Noordwijk
SC Genemuiden	0–3	VV Katwijk
SC Enschede	3–0	SV Meerssen
VV Aalsmeer	2–4	VV DOVO
Achilles 1894	2–2	KVV Quick '20
VV DWV	2–1	BVV
RKSV DCG	1–0	SV Panningen
VV TSC	0–1	GVVV
SV Woerden	0–1	EHC/Villa Nova

== Second round ==
The matches of the second round were played on September 18, 19 and 20, 1992. Except for eleven teams from the Eredivisie, all the other participating clubs entered the tournament here.

Home team	Result	Away team
Go Ahead Eagles _{E}	2–0	FC Eindhoven _{1}
HFC Haarlem _{1}	1–2	FC Volendam _{E}
VV Naaldwijk _{A}	0–1	Helmond Sport _{1}
Quick Boys _{A}	1–2	De Graafschap _{1}
RCH _{A}	0–5	Willem II _{E}
VV Rheden _{A}	2–3	Telstar _{1}
SC Enschede _{A}	0–1	Excelsior _{1}
VVV-Venlo _{1}	4–1	Kozakken Boys _{A}
sc Heerenveen _{1}	7–1	GVVV _{A} (on September 29)
SC Heracles _{1}	4–3	DETO _{A} (on September 29)

Home team	Result	Away team
Achilles 1894 _{A}	1–1 (p)	FC Den Bosch _{E}
ACV _{A}	0–1	Veendam _{1}
ADO Den Haag _{1}	6–0	RKSV Halsteren _{A}
RKSV DCG _{A}	1–0	NEC _{1}
Dordrecht'90 _{E}	3–0	RBC _{1}
VV DOVO _{A}	0–3	AZ _{1}
VV DWV _{A}	0–2	Cambuur Leeuwarden _{E}
HFC EDO _{A}	0–0 (p)	Fortuna Sittard _{E}
EHC/Villa Nova _{A}	1–3	TOP Oss _{1}
FC Emmen _{1}	4–3	NAC Breda _{1}
FC Zwolle _{1}	3–0	VV Katwijk _{A}

_{E} Eredivisie; _{1} Eerste Divisie; _{A} Amateur teams

== Third round ==
The matches of the third round were played on October 28, 1992. The eleven highest ranked Eredivisie teams from last season entered the tournament here.

Home team	Result	Away team
MVV _{E}	1–0	Veendam
Cambuur Leeuwarden	0–3	sc Heerenveen
TOP Oss	5–1	Roda JC _{E}
Vitesse Arnhem _{E}	3–0	ADO Den Haag
FC Volendam _{E}	2–4	PSV _{E}
VVV-Venlo	3–7	Ajax _{E}
Sparta	5–1	Telstar (on November 5)
Fortuna Sittard	1–0 (aet)	AZ (on December 2)

Home team	Result	Away team
RKSV DCG	1–2	FC Zwolle
FC Den Bosch	2–0	SC Heracles
FC Groningen	3–0	Dordrecht'90
FC Twente _{E}	4–2	Willem II _{E}
FC Utrecht _{E}	3–2	FC Emmen
Feyenoord _{E}	7–0	Go Ahead Eagles
De Graafschap	0–1	Excelsior
Helmond Sport	0–1	RKC Waalwijk _{E}

_{E} eleven Eredivisie entrants

== Round of 16 ==
The matches of the round of 16 were played on December 2, 1992.

Home team	Result	Away team
FC Den Bosch	2–1	Vitesse Arnhem
FC Groningen	2–1	Excelsior
Feyenoord	3–1	TOP Oss
PSV	2–1	FC Utrecht
RKC Waalwijk	1–4	FC Zwolle (on December 13)
Sparta	0–2	FC Twente (on December 13)
Fortuna Sittard	0–1	sc Heerenveen (on December 15)
Ajax	3–0	MVV (on January 13, 1993)

== Quarter finals ==
The quarter finals were played on February 17, 1993.

Home team	Result	Away team
FC Den Bosch	2–0	FC Groningen
sc Heerenveen	2–1 (aet)	PSV
FC Twente	2–4 (aet)	Ajax
FC Zwolle	1–1 (p)	Feyenoord (on March 10)

== Semi-finals ==
The semi-finals were played on March 30 and 31, 1993.

Home team	Result	Away team
sc Heerenveen	2–1	FC Den Bosch
Feyenoord	0–5	Ajax

== Final ==
20 May 1993
14:30

Ajax	6–2	SC Heerenveen
Davids 7'; Overmars 45', 88'; Pettersson 69'; Bergkamp 82'; Petersen 87'		Regtop 35'; Cămătaru 90'

De Kuip, Rotterdam
Attendance: 45,000
Referee: Jef van Vliet, (Linesmen: J. van Boekel en R. Overkleeft)

Ajax would participate in the Cup Winners' Cup.
