= 1993–94 Eredivisie =

38th season of the Eredivisie

Eredivisie
- Season: 1993–94
- Champions: Ajax (24th title)
- Promoted: NAC sc Heerenveen; VVV
- Relegated: VVV; Cambuur Leeuw.
- Champions League: Ajax
- Cup Winners' Cup: Feyenoord
- UEFA Cup: PSV; Vitesse Arnhem; FC Twente
- Goals: 901
- Average goals/game: 2.94
- Top goalscorer: (Finland) Jari Litmanen; Ajax 26 goals

The Dutch Eredivisie in the 1993–94 season was contested by 18 teams. Ajax won the championship.

== League standings ==
Pos	Team	Pld	W	D	L	GF	GA	GD	Pts	Qualification or relegation
1	Ajax (C)	34	26	2	6	86	26	+60	54	Qualification to Champions League group stage
2	Feyenoord (Note: Winners of the KNVB Cup)	34	19	13	2	61	27	+34	51	Qualification to Cup Winners' Cup first round
3	PSV	34	17	10	7	60	36	+24	44	Qualification to UEFA Cup first round
4	Vitesse Arnhem	34	17	6	11	63	37	+26	40	Qualification to UEFA Cup first round
5	FC Twente	34	15	9	10	57	43	+14	39	Qualification to UEFA Cup first round
6	Roda JC	34	15	8	11	55	40	+15	38	
7	NAC	34	14	10	10	61	52	+9	38	
8	Willem II	34	15	7	12	48	42	+6	37	Qualification to Intertoto Cup
9	Sparta	34	12	8	14	58	57	+1	32	Qualification to Intertoto Cup
10	MVV	34	11	10	13	49	58	−9	32	
11	FC Volendam	34	13	4	17	46	55	−9	30	
12	Go Ahead Eagles	34	10	8	16	44	57	−13	28	
13	sc Heerenveen	34	9	10	15	35	61	−26	28	
14	FC Groningen	34	9	8	17	42	65	−23	26	
15	FC Utrecht	34	9	8	17	40	63	−23	26	
16	RKC	34	8	9	17	38	56	−18	25	Qualification to Relegation play-offs
17	VVV (R)	34	7	11	16	30	62	−32	25	Qualification to Relegation play-offs
18	Cambuur Leeuwarden (R)	34	6	7	21	28	64	−36	19	Relegation to Eerste Divisie

(C) Champions; (R) Relegated

== Results ==
Home \ Away	AJA	CAM	FEY	GAE	GRO	HEE	MVV	NAC	PSV	RKC	RJC	SPA	TWE	UTR	VIT	VOL	VVV	WIL
Ajax		3–2	2–2	4–0	0–2	2–1	4–1	5–0	2–0	3–0	2–0	3–0	6–0	3–0	3–1	3–1	2–0	3–1
Cambuur	0–3		0–0	1–0	0–2	1–2	2–1	1–3	1–3	1–1	0–1	1–1	1–1	2–1	1–3	3–1	2–1	0–1
Feyenoord	2–1	1–0		1–0	2–2	0–0	4–0	1–1	2–1	1–1	2–1	5–1	1–0	1–1	1–1	2–0	5–0	2–0
Go Ahead Eagles	0–3	3–0	1–1		3–0	2–3	2–2	0–0	0–4	2–0	3–1	1–5	3–3	4–0	1–4	0–1	2–0	3–0
Groningen	0–4	2–2	0–4	3–1		2–2	3–2	0–0	1–2	1–2	3–5	1–4	1–1	4–1	0–0	0–0	0–3	4–1
Heerenveen	1–4	1–2	1–3	1–4	2–0		3–1	1–3	0–0	0–3	0–0	1–0	2–2	1–0	0–4	3–1	1–0	1–2
MVV	1–1	0–0	1–1	2–2	2–0	3–1		2–1	2–1	1–1	1–0	0–0	0–2	2–1	0–2	1–1	0–0	1–0
NAC	0–5	2–0	1–2	2–2	2–1	6–0	1–4		2–2	3–0	2–3	4–3	2–1	2–2	2–2	3–1	4–1	1–1
PSV Eindhoven	4–1	2–0	1–3	3–0	1–1	1–1	4–2	3–1		1–1	2–0	2–1	3–2	1–0	0–1	3–0	3–2	2–1
RKC	0–3	3–0	1–2	1–2	2–3	1–1	0–2	1–0	1–1		1–1	3–1	1–3	3–0	0–0	1–3	1–2	1–0
Roda	1–2	1–1	1–0	2–1	2–0	1–1	4–1	1–2	4–0	2–0		4–0	1–4	4–0	2–1	2–0	0–0	1–1
Sparta Rotterdam	0–1	4–0	3–4	1–0	3–0	3–0	2–2	0–0	0–0	1–1	2–0		2–5	3–2	4–1	4–1	2–2	1–0
FC Twente	2–1	4–1	1–1	1–1	0–1	2–1	4–2	0–1	0–0	2–1	2–1	0–0		1–0	0–1	2–0	3–0	4–0
Utrecht	1–4	2–0	0–0	2–0	2–0	0–1	3–0	0–5	0–4	3–1	1–1	3–1	1–0		2–1	3–1	2–3	1–1
Vitesse	0–1	2–1	1–2	5–0	4–1	3–0	1–3	3–1	0–0	4–1	1–3	2–0	3–0	2–2		2–1	4–0	0–1
Volendam	1–0	4–1	0–1	0–1	1–0	3–0	5–0	1–3	3–2	3–1	2–0	2–1	2–5	2–2	2–0		1–1	0–3
VVV	0–1	1–0	1–1	1–0	1–3	1–1	1–7	1–1	0–3	0–2	2–2	1–4	0–0	1–1	2–1	2–0		0–0
Willem II	2–1	4–1	2–1	0–0	4–1	1–1	1–0	2–0	1–1	4–1	0–3	5–1	2–0	4–1	0–3	0–2	3–0	

Legend: Blue = home team win; Yellow = draw; Red = away team win.

== Promotion/relegation play-offs ==
In the promotion/relegation competition, eight entrants (six from this the Eerste Divisie and two from this league) entered in two groups. The group winners were promoted (or remained in) to the Eredivisie.

Group 1
Pos	Team	Pld	W	D	L	GF	GA	GD	Pts	Qualification
1	RKC	6	3	1	2	14	7	+7	7	Remain in Eredivisie
2	Telstar	6	3	0	3	9	11	−2	6	Remain in Eerste Divisie
3	ADO Den Haag	6	3	0	3	5	12	−7	6	Remain in Eerste Divisie
4	AZ	6	2	1	3	10	8	+2	5	Remain in Eerste Divisie

Group 2
Pos	Team	Pld	W	D	L	GF	GA	GD	Pts	Promotion or relegation
1	NEC	6	6	0	0	14	5	+9	12	Promotion to Eredivisie
2	VVV	6	3	0	3	11	9	+2	6	Relegation to Eerste Divisie
3	SC Heracles	6	2	0	4	8	12	−4	4	Remain in Eerste Divisie
4	De Graafschap	6	1	0	5	10	17	−7	2	Remain in Eerste Divisie

== Attendances ==
No.	Club	Average	Change	Highest
1	PSV	25,759	1,8%	30,000
2	Feyenoord	24,707	5,7%	45,000
3	AFC Ajax	23,331	11,5%	48,000
4	sc Heerenveen	12,682	49,1%	14,000
5	FC Groningen	11,367	-8,1%	14,577
6	NAC Breda	10,133	107,6%	11,684
7	Willem II	7,715	17,9%	13,000
8	Roda JC	7,137	104,3%	20,000
9	SC Cambuur	7,000	-3,1%	13,000
10	SBV Vitesse	6,831	-4,2%	11,637
11	Go Ahead Eagles	6,611	3,4%	12,000
12	FC Twente	6,482	-10,2%	13,300
13	VVV-Venlo	6,376	47,6%	14,189
14	MVV Maastricht	5,973	-10,7%	10,732
15	FC Utrecht	5,809	-16,8%	14,500
16	FC Volendam	4,824	27,1%	30,000
17	Sparta Rotterdam	4,459	1,1%	13,500
18	RKC Waalwijk	3,006	-6,9%	6,000

== See also ==
- 1993–94 Eerste Divisie
- 1993–94 KNVB Cup
