= Petri Pasanen =

Finnish footballer (born 1980)

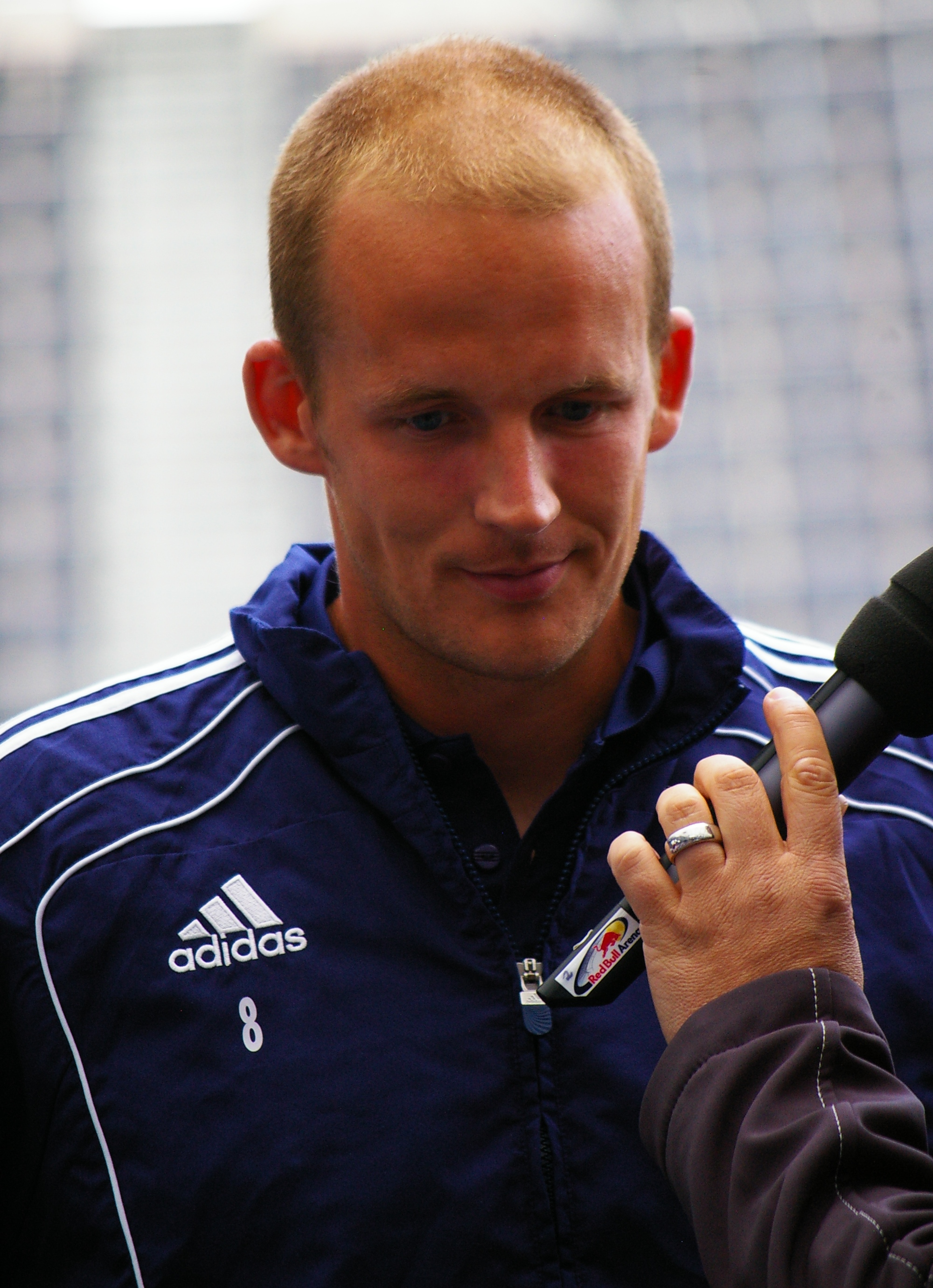
- Pasanen with Red Bull Salzburg in 2011

Personal information
- Full name: Petri Mikael Pasanen
- Date of birth: 24 September 1980 (age 46)
- Place of birth: Lahti, Finland
- Height: 1.87 m (6 ft 2 in)
- Position: Defender

Senior career*
Years	Team	Apps	(Gls)
1996	Kuusysi	2	(0)
1996–2000	Lahti	72	(2)
1997	→ Hämeenlinna (loan)	4	(0)
1998	→ Hämeenlinna (loan)	1	(0)
2000–2004	Ajax	59	(7)
2004	→ Portsmouth (loan)	12	(0)
2004–2011	Werder Bremen	144	(3)
2011–2012	Red Bull Salzburg	18	(0)
2012–2014	AGF	44	(2)
2014–2015	Lahti	30	(1)
Total		386	(15)

International career
2000	Finland U21	6	(0)
2000–2013	Finland	76	(1)

Managerial career
- Lahti (youth)
- 2022–2023: Lahti (assistant)
Medal record
Finland national football team
Runner-up	Baltic Cup	2012
AFC Ajax
Winner	Eredivisie	2002
Winner	KNVB Cup	2002
Winner	Johan Cruijff Shield	2002
Runner-up	Eredivisie	2003
Werder Bremen
Runner-up	Bundesliga	2006
Runner-up	Bundesliga	2008
Runner-up	UEFA Europa League	2009
Winner	DFB-Pokal	2009
Runner-up	DFB-Pokal	2010
FC Red Bull Salzburg
Winner	Austrian Bundesliga	2012
Winner	Austrian Cup	2012
- * Club domestic league appearances and goals

Petri Pasanen (born 24 September 1980) is a Finnish football coach, TV studio presenter and a former professional footballer who played as a defender. He was most comfortable as centre-back, but also played right-back and left-back as well. Pasanen began his senior career in his native Finland before moving to Ajax. He spent most of his career at Bundesliga club Werder Bremen which he represented in the UEFA Champions League in multiple seasons, and in the 2009 UEFA Cup Final. At international level, he made 76 appearances for the Finland national team scoring one goal.

== Club career ==
=== FC Lahti ===
Born in Lahti, Finland, Pasanen became a regular for local club FC Lahti during the club's promotion season in 1998. During the next two seasons he made 42 appearances for the club in Finland's Veikkausliiga.

=== Ajax ===
Many of Europe's top clubs had become interested in the promising Pasanen, and in the summer of 2000 he joined Dutch club Ajax. The transfer fee was not disclosed, but is believed to be around 6 million Finnish markka, which corresponds roughly to €1 million. He became a regular in the Ajax defense in his first season, but his progress was halted when he broke his foot in August 2001, and had to miss most of the 2001–02 season. Next season he was a regular again as Ajax reached the quarter-finals of the UEFA Champions League.

He fell out of favour at Ajax in 2003–04, and spent the second half of the season on loan at English club Portsmouth in the Premier League. Portsmouth manager Harry Redknapp was interested in purchasing Pasanen at the end of the season, but claimed Ajax's asking price was too high.

=== Werder Bremen ===
Pasanen was then signed by reigning German champions Werder Bremen in the summer of 2004. He became a key player for the club, helping them to a top three finish in the Bundesliga and the second round of the Champions League in each of his first two seasons at the club. Whilst at Bremen he played in the 2009 UEFA Cup Final.

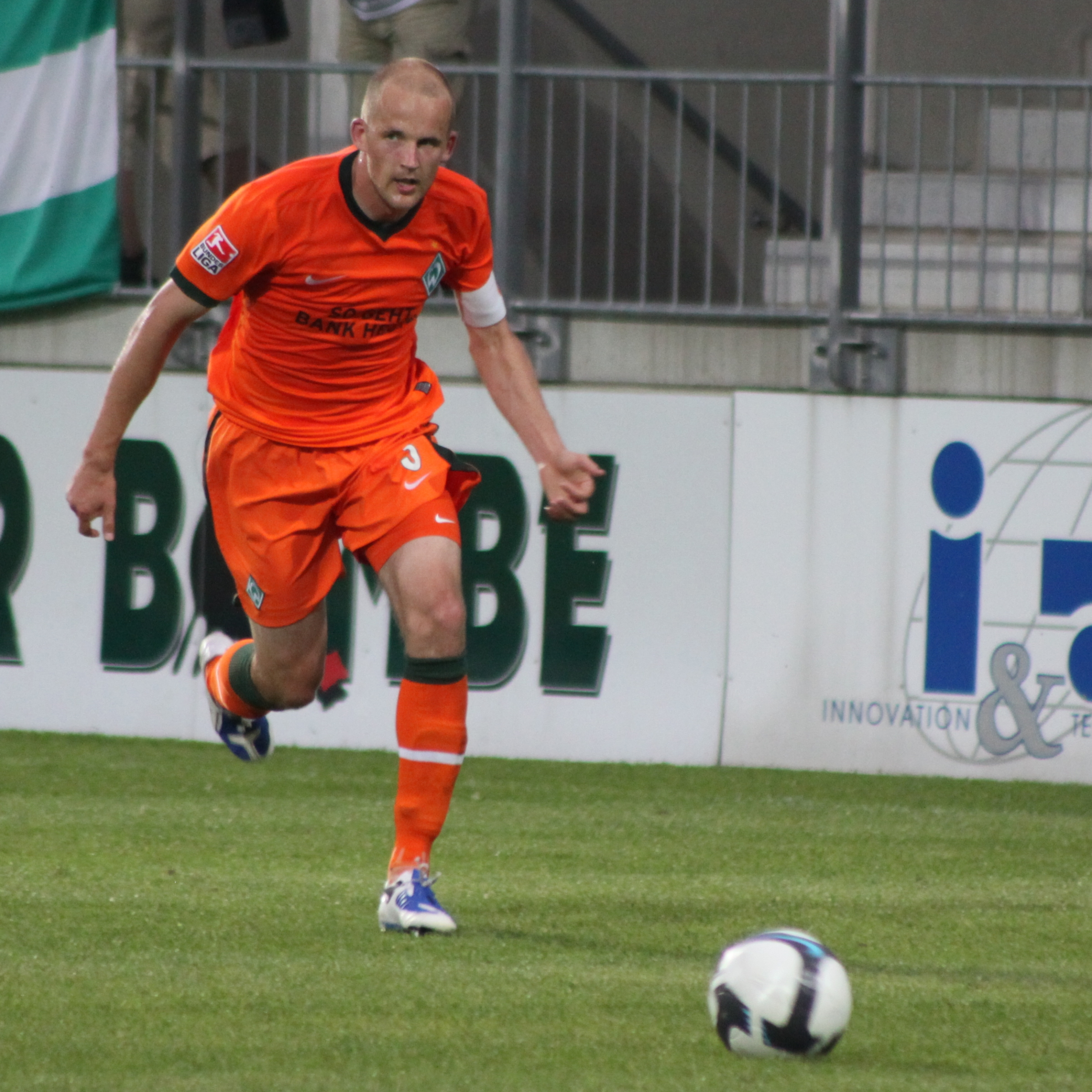
Pasanen with Werder Bremen in 2009

=== Red Bull Salzburg ===
On 30 June 2011, after the end of his contract, he left Werder Bremen, and signed for Red Bull Salzburg. On 12 May 2012, Salzburg announced that they would not renew Pasanen's contract and he would be free to look for a new club during the summer.

=== AGF Aarhus ===
On 28 July 2012, Pasanen signed a two-year contract with Danish topflight side AGF. He scored his first goal for AGF on 10 December 2012, in a 3−3 home draw against Silkeborg.

=== Return to Lahti ===
In May 2014, FC Lahti announced that Pasanen would return to Lahti and that he had signed a contract until the end of the 2016 season. On 29 September 2015, Pasanen announced that he would retire from professional football at the end of the season.

== International career ==
Pasanen was also a regular for the Finland national team. He made his international debut on 15 November 2000 against the Republic of Ireland. Pasanen has mostly played at right back for Finland, and has also served as the national team's captain, when Sami Hyypiä and Jari Litmanen have not played. He scored his only goal on 22 May 2002 in a home friendly at the Helsinki Olympic Stadium against Latvia, which Finland won 2–1.

Pasanen has also played in Finland national futsal team, where he has six caps and two goals.

== Coaching career ==
After his playing career, Pasanen has worked as a youth coach for FC Lahti, and as an assistant coach of the club's first team during 2022–2023.

== Later career ==
After his professional career, Pasanen has worked as a football pundit for Yle in 2014–2018, and for MTV Oy in 2018–2020. Since 2020, Pasanen has worked for MTV and C More Finland as a football studio host in UEFA Champions League matches and international tournaments. In May 2023, Pasanen worked as a studio host in 2023 IIHF Ice Hockey World Championship tournament.

== Personal life ==
His son Samuel Pasanen is also a professional footballer, playing for FC Lahti in Veikkausliiga.

== Career statistics ==
=== Club ===
Appearances and goals by club, season and competition
Club	Season	League			National cups		Europe		Total	
Club	Season	Division	Apps	Goals	Apps	Goals	Apps	Goals	Apps	Goals
Kuusysi	1996	Ykkönen	2	0	0	0	0	0	2	0
Lahti	1997	Ykkönen	15	0	0	0	0	0	15	0
Lahti	1998	Ykkönen	15	1	0	0	0	0	15	1
Lahti	1999	Veikkausliiga	27	0	0	0	0	0	27	0
Lahti	2000	Veikkausliiga	15	1	0	0	0	0	15	1
Lahti	Total		72	2	0	0	0	0	72	2
Hämeenlinna (loan)	1997	Ykkönen	4	0	0	0	0	0	4	0
Hämeenlinna (loan)	1998	Ykkönen	1	0	0	0	0	0	1	0
Hämeenlinna (loan)	Total		5	0	0	0	0	0	5	0
Ajax	2000–01	Eredivisie	29	4	0	0	0	0	29	4
Ajax	2001–02	Eredivisie	1	0	0	0	0	0	1	0
Ajax	2002–03	Eredivisie	22	3	0	0	0	0	22	3
Ajax	2003–04	Eredivisie	7	0	0	0	0	0	7	0
Ajax	Total		59	7	0	0	0	0	59	7
Portsmouth (loan)	2003–04	Premier League	12	0	0	0	0	0	12	0
Werder Bremen	2004–05	Bundesliga	23	1	0	0	0	0	23	1
Werder Bremen	2005–06	Bundesliga	17	0	0	0	5	0	23	0
Werder Bremen	2006–07	Bundesliga	17	0	0	0	2	0	19	0
Werder Bremen	2007–08	Bundesliga	28	2	0	0	8	0	36	2
Werder Bremen	2008–09	Bundesliga	16	0	0	0	5	0	21	0
Werder Bremen	2009–10	Bundesliga	19	0	4	1	10	0	33	1
Werder Bremen	2010–11	Bundesliga	24	0	1	0	7	0	32	0
Werder Bremen	Total		144	3	5	1	37	0	186	4
Red Bull Salzburg	2011–12	Austrian Bundesliga	18	0	3	0	11	0	32	0
AGF	2012–13	Superliga	23	1	1	0	0	0	24	1
AGF	2013–14	Superliga	21	1	0	0	0	0	21	1
AGF	Total		44	2	1	0	0	0	45	2
Lahti	2014	Veikkausliiga	11	1	1	0	0	0	12	1
Lahti	2015	Veikkausliiga	19	0	5	0	2	0	26	0
Lahti	Total		30	1	6	0	2	0	38	1
Career total			386	15	15	1	50	0	451	16

=== International ===
Appearances and goals by national team and year
National team	Year	Apps	Goals
Finland	2000	1	0
Finland	2001	5	0
Finland	2002	5	1
Finland	2003	6	0
Finland	2004	8	0
Finland	2005	3	0
Finland	2006	7	0
Finland	2007	10	0
Finland	2008	3	0
Finland	2009	9	0
Finland	2010	5	0
Finland	2011	5	0
Finland	2012	3	0
Finland	2013	6	0
Total		76	1

Scores and results list Finland's goal tally first, score column indicates score after Pasanen goal.

International goal scored by Petri Pasanen
No.	Date	Venue	Opponent	Score	Result	Competition
1	22 May 2002	Helsingin olympiastadion, Helsinki, Finland	Latvia	2–1	2–1	Friendly

== Honours ==
Ajax

- Eredivisie: 2001–02
- KNVB Cup: 2001–02
- Johan Cruijff Shield: 2002

Werder Bremen

- DFB Ligapokal: 2006
- DFB-Pokal: 2008–09
- UEFA Cup Runner-up: 2008–09

Red Bull Salzburg

- Austrian Bundesliga: 2011–12
- Austrian Cup: 2011–12

Individual

- 2008: Finnish Sports Journalists footballer of the year
