= Edwin Hermans =

Dutch football manager (born 1974)

Personal information
- Date of birth: 23 May 1974 (age 52)
- Place of birth: Goirle, Netherlands
- Height: 1.79 m (5 ft 10 in)
- Position: Left back

Youth career
- RKTVV
- PSV

Senior career*
Years	Team	Apps	(Gls)
1992–1995	PSV	0	(0)
1993–1994	→ Eindhoven (loan)	10	(1)
1994–1995	→ Volendam (loan)	10	(0)
1995–1997	MVV	65	(2)
1997–2002	Fortuna Sittard	161	(0)
2002–2004	De Graafschap	56	(0)
2004–2006	Fortuna Sittard	63	(2)
2006–2007	Willem II	10	(0)
Total		375	(5)

Managerial career
- 2007–2010: Willem II (youth)
- 2010: Willem II (assistant)
- 2010–2014: MVV (assistant)
- 2015–2016: VV SCM
- 2016–2020: RKSV Heer
- 2022–2023: MVV U21
- 2023–2024: MVV (assistant)
- 2024–2025: MVV
- 2026-: PSV (academy)
- * Club domestic league appearances and goals

Edwin Hermans (born 23 May 1974) is a Dutch professional football manager and former player who most recently managed Eerste Divisie club MVV.

== Early life ==
Hermans was born in Goirle. He started playing football with amateur club RKTVV from Tilburg. At the age of 17, he was scouted by PSV, where he played for the youth team. His first coach at PSV was Huub Stevens, whom he credits with creating an "undefeatable mentality" in him.

== Club career ==
=== PSV and loans ===
Hermans never played a match for PSV's first team. Instead, he made his debut in professional football for Eerste Divisie club Eindhoven in the 1993–94 season, on loan from PSV. The following season, he was loaned to Eredivisie side FC Volendam.

=== MVV ===
In 1995, he moved to Eerste Divisie club MVV, where he became a regular at left back. In his second season, Hermans helped MVV win the title and promotion to the Eredivisie.

=== Fortuna Sittard ===
In the summer of 1997, Hermans moved to Fortuna Sittard, where he would be a regular for five seasons. In his first season, Fortuna, who were managed by Bert van Marwijk, reached seventh place and qualified for the Intertoto Cup. In the 1998–99 season, Fortuna finished tenth and were runners-up in the KNVB Cup. After Van Marwijk left the club in the summer of 2000, however, they began to drop into the relegation zone, and at the end of the 2001–02 season, Fortuna were relegated.

=== De Graafschap ===
Following Fortuna Sittard's relegation, Hermans remained in the Eredivisie, having been signed by De Graafschap. The 2002–03 season was not a success, however, as De Graafschap were relegated. In the 2003–04 Eerste Divisie season, despite finishing in sixth place in the regular competition, Hermans helped De Graafschap win one of the two playoffs groups and achieve promotion back to the Eredivisie.

=== Return to Fortuna Sittard ===
In 2004, Hermans made a return to Fortuna Sittard. He played for the club for two more seasons, both of which ended with Fortuna in last place of the Eerste Divisie.

=== Willem II ===
On 31 August 2006, Hermans was signed by Willem II, who were looking to add experienced players to their young squad. Hermans' transfer was met with some surprise, because at the time, he was a substitute player at Fortuna Sittard, a rather modest Eerste Divisie club; Willem II, on the other hand, were a steady Eredivisie club. He would make ten appearances for the team, nine of those coming before the winter break. Due to a back injury, his playing time in the second part of the season was limited to one substitute appearance. He retired at the end of the season.

== Managerial career ==
After retiring as a player, Hermans remained at Willem II, where he worked with the club's youth teams. On 19 February 2010, following the dismissal of first-team manager Alfons Groenendijk, he was promoted to the senior coaching staff, serving as assistant first to interim coach Mark Schenning and subsequently to Arno Pijpers.

In July 2010, Hermans was appointed assistant manager of MVV, a role he held for four years until his contract was not renewed in May 2014 as part of cost-cutting measures. The following year he took charge of amateur side VV SCM, and in November 2015 turned down an offer to become manager of Fortuna Sittard.

On 27 May 2024, Hermans was appointed head coach of Eerste Divisie club MVV ahead of the 2024–25 season, having served as assistant during the previous campaign. His first season in charge ended with a fifteenth-place finish, and he remained in post for the start of the 2025–26 season. On 23 September 2025, MVV announced that Hermans had left his position by mutual consent after the side lost five of their opening seven matches. Reports in the Dutch media also noted unrest within the squad at the time, including midfielder Bryan Smeets requesting a transfer and being moved to the under-21 squad until the winter break.

Hermans was named part of the PSV youth set-up in March 2026.

== Personal life ==
Hermans is married to Caroline. They have three children named Kay, Pleun and Daantje.

== Honours ==
MVV

- Eerste Divisie: 1996–97
