= 2004 Johan Cruyff Shield =

Johan Cruijff Schaal IX
Ajax	FC Utrecht
2	4
- Date: 8 August 2004
- Venue: Amsterdam Arena, Amsterdam
- Referee: Dick van Egmond
- Attendance: 33,500

The ninth edition of the Johan Cruyff Shield (Dutch: Johan Cruijff Schaal) was held on 8 August 2004 between 2003–04 Eredivisie champions Ajax and 2003–04 KNVB Cup winners FC Utrecht. FC Utrecht won the match 4–2.

== Match details ==
8 August 2004

Ajax	2–4	FC Utrecht
Pienaar 51'; Sneijder 80'	Report	Schut 72'; Somers 87', 90'; Douglas 90+4'

Amsterdam Arena, Amsterdam
Attendance: 33,500
Referee: Dick van Egmond

Ajax	FC Utrecht

GK	21	(Netherlands) Maarten Stekelenburg
RB	12	(Ghana) Anthony Obodai
CB	3	(Netherlands) John Heitinga
LB	5	(Brazil) Maxwell
RM	8	(South Africa) Steven Pienaar		(substituted off) 70'
CM	6	(Czech Republic) Tomáš Galásek
CM	16	(Netherlands) Nigel de Jong
LM	11	(Belgium) Tom Soetaers	(red card) 53'
AM	10	(Netherlands) Rafael van der Vaart (c)
CF	19	(Belgium) Wesley Sonck		(substituted off) 58'
CF	9	(Sweden) Zlatan Ibrahimović		(substituted off) 77'
Substitutes:
GK	1	(Romania) Bogdan Lobonț
DF	4	(France) Julien Escudé
DF	23	(Czech Republic) Zdeněk Grygera		(substituted in) 70'
MF	18	(Netherlands) Wesley Sneijder		(substituted in) 58'
FW	17	(Greece) Yannis Anastasiou
FW	20	(Netherlands) Daniël de Ridder
FW	27	(Belgium) Tom De Mul		(substituted in) 77'
Manager:
(Netherlands) Ronald Koeman

GK	1	(Netherlands) Joost Terol
CB	8	(Netherlands) Joost Broerse	(yellow card) 26' (yellow-red card) 77'
CB	4	(France) David Di Tommaso
CB	17	(Netherlands) Alje Schut
RWB	2	(Netherlands) Tim Cornelisse
LWB	5	(Netherlands) Etienne Shew-Atjon		(substituted off) 75'
DM	6	(Netherlands) Jean-Paul de Jong (c)		(substituted off) 85'
RM	7	(Netherlands) Darl Douglas
LM	11	(Netherlands) Dave van den Bergh
AM	10	(Belgium) Stefaan Tanghe
CF	20	(Netherlands) Sandro Calabro		(substituted off) 68'
Substitutes:
GK	12	(Netherlands) René Ponk
DF	19	(Netherlands) Bas van den Brink
DF	15	(Netherlands) Edson Braafheid		(substituted in) 75'
MF	3	(Netherlands) Jordy Zuidam
MF	21	(Netherlands) Rick Kruys
MF	23	(Belgium) Hans Somers		(substituted in) 85'
FW	18	(Netherlands) Prince Rajcomar		(substituted in) 68'
Manager:
(Netherlands) Foeke Booy
