= Etienne Shew-Atjon =

Dutch association football player

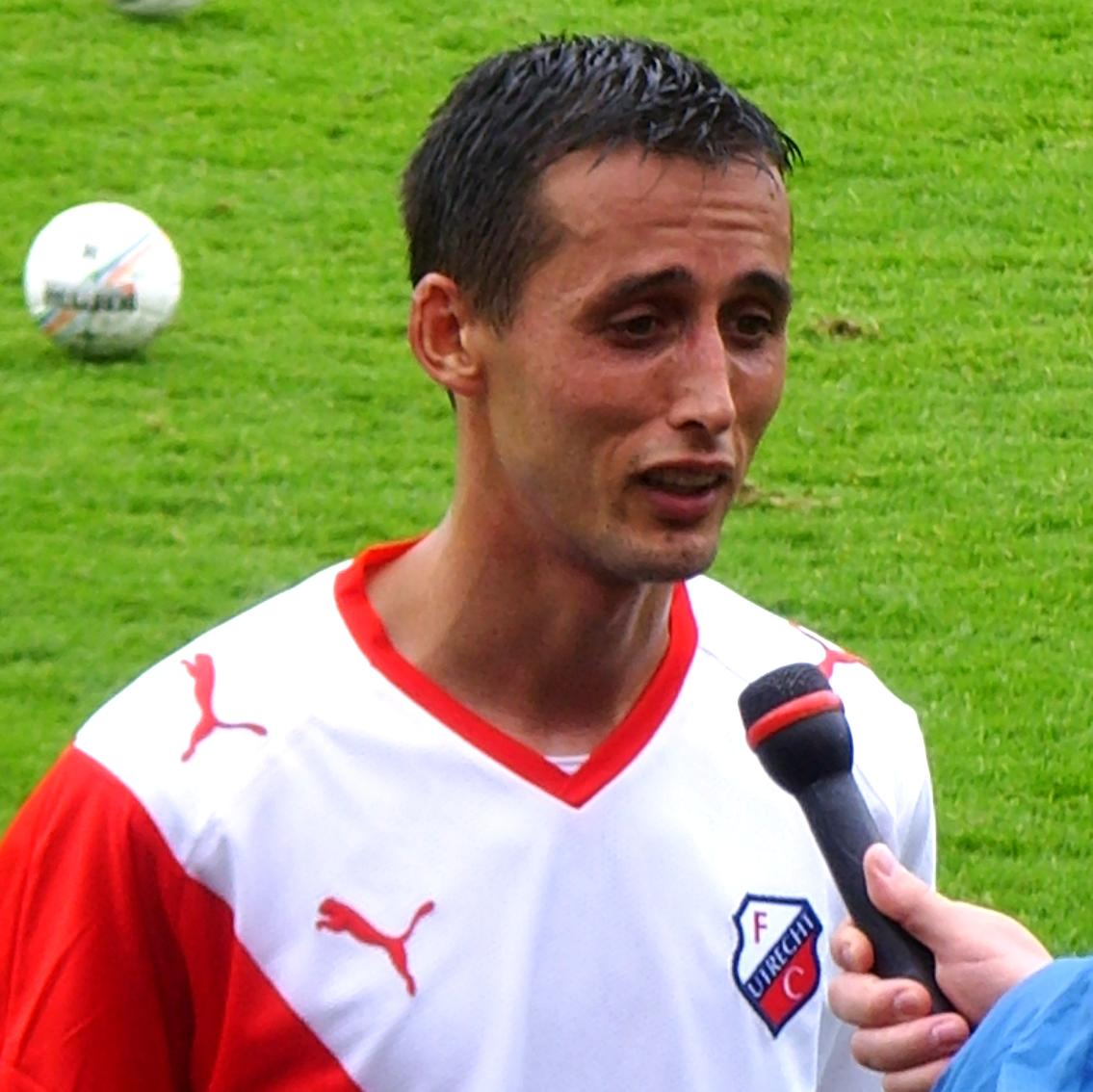
- Shew-Atjon with Utrecht in 2008

Personal information
- Full name: Etienne Shew-Atjon
- Date of birth: 24 November 1974 (age 51)
- Place of birth: Rotterdam, Netherlands
- Height: 1.83 m (6 ft 0 in)
- Position: Left back

Youth career
- SC Botlek
- Feyenoord

Senior career*
Years	Team	Apps	(Gls)
1996–1998	Rozenburg		
1998–2009	Utrecht	151	(1)
2009–2010	Dordrecht	28	(0)
2010–2011	RVVH		
2011–2013	Smitshoek		
Total		178	(1)
- * Club domestic league appearances and goals

Etienne Shew-Atjon (born 24 November 1974) is a Dutch former professional footballer and current video analyst for Feyenoord. During his eleven years with Utrecht, they won the KNVB Cup, twice.

== Career ==
=== Early career ===
Shew-Atjon joined the Feyenoord academy on an early age, but instead of being promoted for the first squad, he was released in early 1996. He then joined amateur club VV Rozenburg, where he played in the Hoofdklasse for two years. He impressed there, and was offered a contract by Eredivisie club FC Utrecht in 1998. He made his debut in professional football on 23 August 1998, in a 2–4 away win over NAC Breda. Shew-Atjon started in the starting line-up, but was replaced at half-time for Emmanuel Nwakire.

=== Professional career ===
Partly due to injuries, Shew-Atjon never grew into a permanent starter for Utrecht, but nevertheless remained continuously connected to the club. At the end of the 2007–08 season, in which he made only two league appearances due to an achilles tendon injury, his expiring contract did initially not seem to be extended, because he did not feature in the plans of head coach Willem van Hanegem. After defender Erik Pieters moved to PSV Eindhoven in the summer break prior to the 2008–09 season, Shew-Atjon was nevertheless offered a one-year contract extension. However, the club continued to look for a permanent replacement for Pieters, and eventually found this in Romanian Mihai Neșu. Shew-Atjon indicated that she was very pleased with the contract, and said "Especially because the club previously indicated that it did not want to continue with me, this is a nice gift. The fact that after my active football career I will continue to work as a scout for FC Utrecht has really been a wish of mine."

The one-year contract was since not renewed, and in the spring of 2009, Shew-Atjon joined FC Dordrecht in the second-tier Eerste Divisie. In the following season, he made 28 appearances for the club in the Eerste Divisie.

=== Post-retirement ===
After his season at Dordrecht, Shew-Atjon retired from professional football, and played a season with RVVH from Ridderkerk and then for two years with VV Smitshoek which he combined with a job as scout for Utrecht.

Shew-Atjon has been working at the Feyenoord Academy since July 2013; initially as a U15 coach, and from the summer of 2016 as a video and performance analyst for the youth department. In 2020, he was promoted to the main video analyst for Feyenoord and is part of the first-team staff.

== Honours ==
Utrecht

- KNVB Cup: 2002–03, 2003–04
- Johan Cruyff Shield: 2004
