= Mark Schenning =

Dutch footballer and manager

Personal information
- Date of birth: 18 October 1970 (age 56)
- Place of birth: Apeldoorn, Netherlands
- Height: 1.93 m (6 ft 4 in)
- Position: Defender

Team information
- Current team: OJC Rosmalen (manager)

Youth career
- 1977–1986: Robur et Velocitas
- 1986–1987: Go Ahead Eagles

Senior career*
Years	Team	Apps	(Gls)
1987–1996	Go Ahead Eagles	246	(18)
1996–1999	Willem II	77	(3)
2000	Den Bosch	17	(1)
2000–2005	NAC Breda	96	(1)
Total		436	(23)

Managerial career
- 2009–2010: Willem II (women)
- 2010: Willem II (caretaker)
- 2010–2012: RKSV Schijndel
- 2012–2017: UNA
- 2017: VVSB
- 2019–: OJC Rosmalen
- * Club domestic league appearances and goals

Mark Schenning (born 18 October 1970) is a Dutch professional football manager and former player. He spent his entire career in the Netherlands, playing for clubs such as Go Ahead Eagles, Willem II, Den Bosch and NAC Breda.

After retirement, Schenning enrolled into management. He first took change of the Willem II's women team for one season, before moving on to the primary outfit in a caretaker role. Some months later, Schenning descended into the lower divisions, first being appointed of Hoofdklasse B amateur club RKSV Schijndel for two years. Schenning is at present in charge of Hoofdklasse club OJC Rosmalen, a position he has held since 2019.

== Club career ==
=== Early career ===
Schenning started his career at Robur et Velocitas, before transferring to Go Ahead Eagles, where he was promoted to the senior side in 1987. He played in nine seasons for the club, before leaving in 1996.

=== Willem II ===
In July 1996, Schenning joined Willem II for a fee of ƒ1 million, signing a three-year contract. He made his league debut on 21 August 1996 in a 0–0 away draw against Groningen. Schenning scored his first goal in the 1997–98 season on 26 April 1998 against RKC Waalwijk, a match Willem won 4–1. During the 1999–2000 season, he participated in their UEFA Champions League season, where he scored once against Sparta Prague in the first group stage on 20 October 1999, which Willem lost 4–3.

=== Den Bosch ===
In February 2000, Schenning completed a move to Den Bosch, joining Christopher Wreh. Schenning made his first appearance against PSV Eindhoven on 6 February 2000 in a 6–2 home loss at De Vliert. During the club's 2000–01 season, which saw them compete in the Eerste Divisie, following their relegation from the top flight, he netted his first league goal on 4 September 2000 in a 2–0 win played at 's-Hertogenbosch over TOP Oss, in which he was also ejected after a foul. It proved to be his only goal, as Schenning was dismissed by the side along with ten other players due to their economic difficulties.

=== NAC Breda ===
On 31 October 2000, it was announced that Schenning had been purchased by NAC Breda on a two-and-a-half-year deal.

== Managerial career ==
Schenning managed the women's team of Willem II from 2009 to 2010. The same year, he served as an assistant manager to Edwin Hermans for the Willem II reserves a short period of time. Schenning was unveiled as the interim manager of the main club on 19 February 2010, taking over after Alfons Groenendijk. A few months later, on 2 November 2010, Schenning was given the managerial post of RKSV Schijndel, staying there until 2012. He penned a contract in December 2012 with VV UNA, making him the new head coach of the club.

After four-and-a-half years in charge of UNA, Schenning was appointed manager of VVSB in the summer of 2017. In November of the same year, however, he was dismissed with the board citing disagreements between him and the team as well as disappointing results.

In January 2019, Schenning became the new manager of OJC Rosmalen.

== Personal life ==
Schenning resides in Hilvarenbeek. He has two children, Eline and Bas.

== Career statistics ==
Appearances and goals by club, season and competition
Club	Season	League		Cup		Continental		Total	
Club	Season	Apps	Goals	Apps	Goals	Apps	Goals	Apps	Goals
Go Ahead Eagles	1987–88	14	1			—		14	1
Go Ahead Eagles	1988–89	19	0			—		19	0
Go Ahead Eagles	1989–90	26	0			—		26	0
Go Ahead Eagles	1990–91	31	0			—		31	0
Go Ahead Eagles	1991–92	36	5			—		36	5
Go Ahead Eagles	1992–93	30	2			—		30	2
Go Ahead Eagles	1993–94	28	1			—		28	1
Go Ahead Eagles	1994–95	32	5			—		32	5
Go Ahead Eagles	1995–96	30	4			—		30	4
Go Ahead Eagles	Total	246	18			—		246	18
Willem II	1996–97	26	0			—		26	0
Willem II	1997–98	15	2			—		15	2
Willem II	1998–99	24	1			4	1	28	2
Willem II	1999–2000	12	0	1	0	5	1	18	1
Willem II	Total	77	3	1	0	9	2	87	5
Den Bosch	1999–2000	13	0			—		13	0
Den Bosch	2000–01	4	1			—		4	1
Den Bosch	Total	17	1			—		17	1
NAC Breda	2000–01	19	0	—		—		19	0
NAC Breda	2001–02	23	1	—		—		23	1
NAC Breda	2002–03	26	0	3	1	1	0	30	1
NAC Breda	2003–04	12	0	3	0	1	0	16	0
NAC Breda	2004–05	16	0	1	0	—		17	0
NAC Breda	Total	96	1	7	1	2	0	105	2
Career total		436	23	8	1	11	2	455	26

== Managerial statistics ==
As of 10 December 2016

Managerial record by team and tenure
Team	From	To	Record					Ref
Team	From	To	G	W	D	L	Win %	Ref
Willem II (women)	8 July 2009	19 February 2010						
Willem II (caretaker)	19 February 2010	27 February 2010	1	0	0	1	0.00	
RKSV Schijndel	2 November 2010	2012	52	30	10	12	57.69	
VV UNA	11 December 2012	16 July 2017	110	54	24	32	49.09	
Total			163	84	34	45	51.53	—
