= Joost Terol =

Dutch footballer (born 1980)

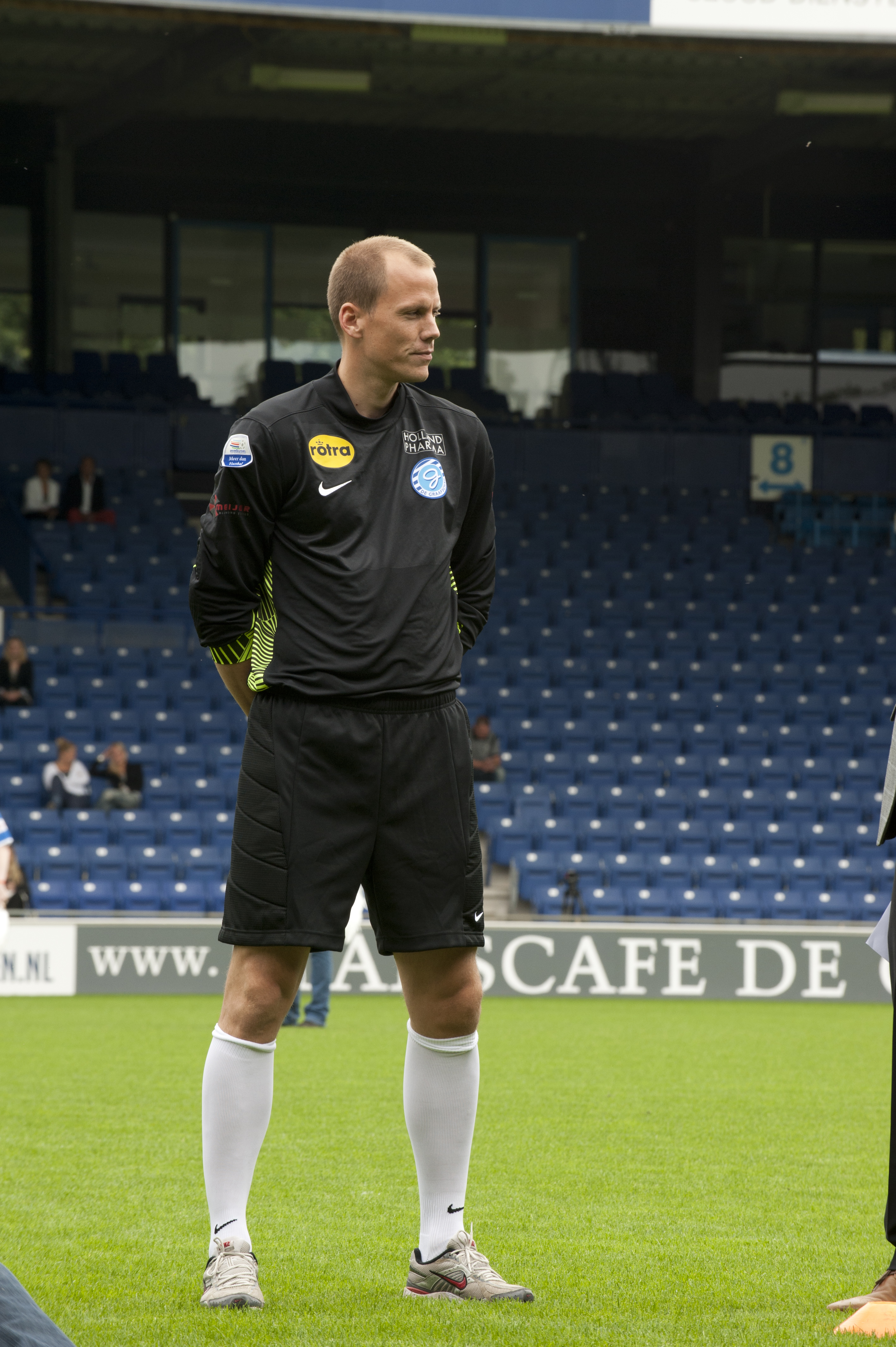
- Terol in 2011

Personal information
- Full name: Joost Adrianus Terol
- Date of birth: 1 February 1980 (age 46)
- Place of birth: Leiden, Netherlands
- Height: 1.93 m (6 ft 4 in)
- Position: Goalkeeper

Youth career
- SJC

Senior career*
Years	Team	Apps	(Gls)
1996–1998	SJC		
2001–2003	Noordwijk		
2003–2006	Utrecht	48	(0)
2006–2007	Sparta Rotterdam	15	(0)
2007–2008	Veria	16	(0)
2008	AEP Paphos	6	(0)
2009	AGOVV	13	(0)
2009–2013	De Graafschap	75	(0)
2014	Antwerp	6	(0)
- * Club domestic league appearances and goals

Joost Terol (born 1 February 1980) is a Dutch former professional footballer who played as a goalkeeper.

== Club career ==
Born in Leiden, Terol started at SJC where he joined the first team at the age of 16 playing in the Tweede Klasse. When he dropped out of his CIOS education, he joined the military and quit football. He served in Kosovo as part of the 13 Infantry Battalion. In 2001, he began playing in the Hoofdklasse for VV Noordwijk.

As part of the Netherlands military national football team, he was scouted by FC Utrecht, where he subsequently played for three seasons. He was the backup goalkeeper behind René Ponk for a season and a half, after which he became the starting keeper Utrecht in early 2005. He made his professional debut on 26 October 2003 in a 2–2 away draw against FC Twente, when he came in for an injured René Ponk after 43 minutes.

From the summer of 2005, he lost his starting place to Guadeloupean keeper Franck Grandel, who had been signed from French club Troyes AC. After a series of mistakes from Grandel, he reclaimed his starting position. Terol signed for Sparta Rotterdam ahead of the 2006–07 season, before playing in Greece and Cyprus. After Cyprus he went back to the Netherlands to play for AGOVV Apeldoorn. On 24 June 2009, De Graafschap announced that they had signed Terol as a replacement for Erik Heijblok who had left for AZ. With De Graafschap, he won promotion to the Eredivisie in his first season, after which he was rewarded with a contract extension of one year. In the summer of 2013 he was left without a club. In January 2014, he signed with Belgian club Royal Antwerp until the end of the 2013–14 season.

In mid-2014, Terol became the goalkeeper coach at VV Katwijk. He resigned from the position in December 2017.

== Honours ==
Utrecht

- KNVB Cup: 2003–04
- Johan Cruyff Shield: 2004

De Graafschap

- Eerste Divisie: 2009–10
