= Alje Schut =

Dutch former professional footballer (born 1981)

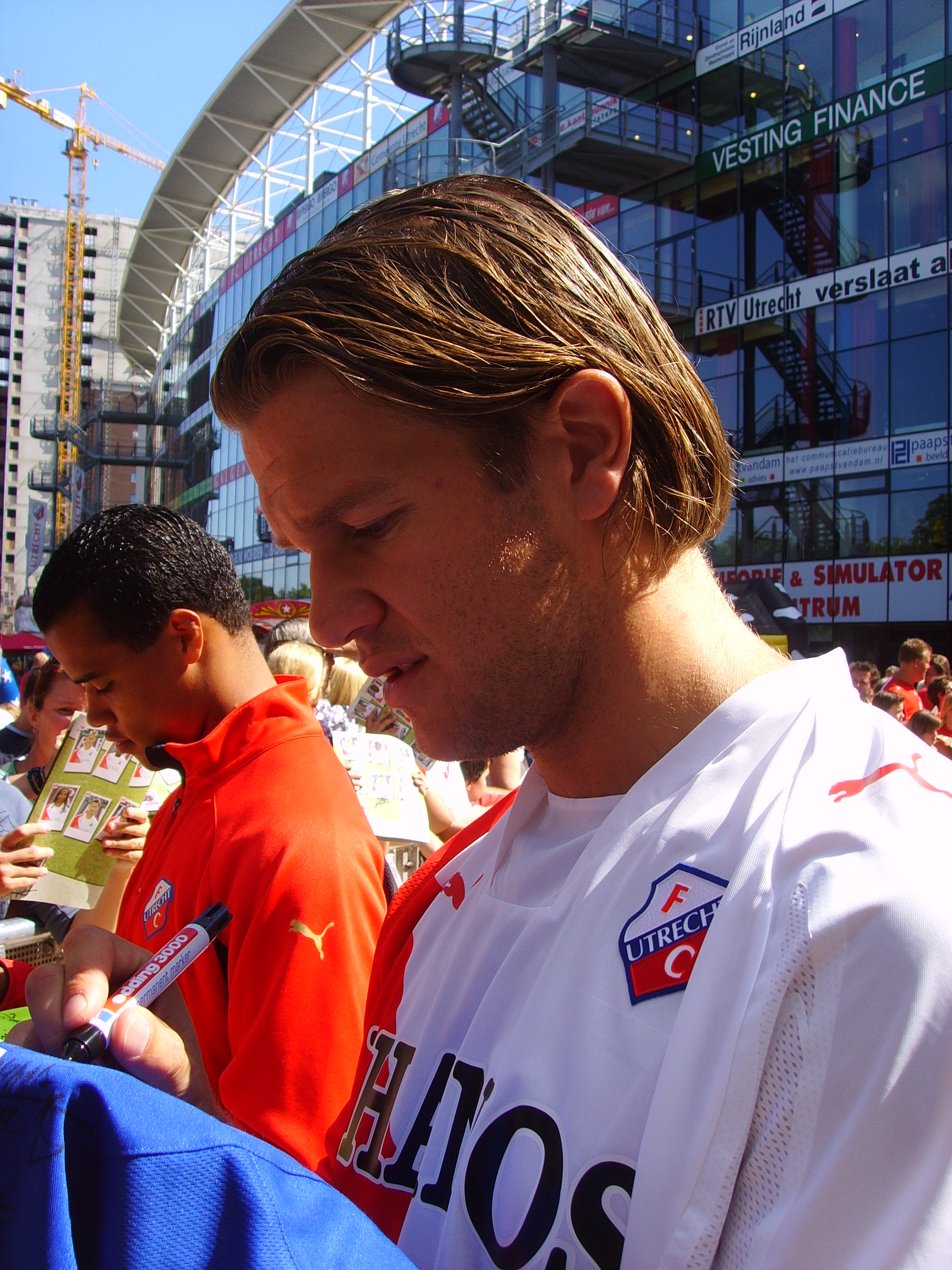

Personal information
- Date of birth: 18 February 1981 (age 45)
- Place of birth: Utrecht, Netherlands
- Height: 1.92 m (6 ft 4 in)
- Position: Defender

Senior career*
Years	Team	Apps	(Gls)
1999–2012	FC Utrecht	191	(10)
2012–2015	Mamelodi Sundowns	67	(9)
Total		276	(18)

International career
1999–2000	Netherlands U19	4	(0)
2001–2002	Netherlands U20	4	(0)
- * Club domestic league appearances and goals

Alje Schut (born 18 February 1981) is a Dutch former professional footballer who played as a defender for FC Utrecht, Mamelodi Sundowns and Kozakken Boys.

== Career ==
Born in Utrecht, Schut began his career with his hometown club FC Utrecht, making his professional debut on 3 October 1999.

In 2004 he spent seven months injured following a bacterial infection in his knee. In March 2005 he suffered another knee injury, ending his season. He was still suffering from that same injury in January 2006; at that time he was expected to return to fitness in April 2006.

He suffered further injuries, and only played 51 league matches between 2005 and March 2010.

On 10 May 2011, during a training session with his team, Schut collided with his Romanian teammate Mihai Neșu, breaking Neșu's cervical vertebrae and leaving him paralyzed from the waist down.

In August 2011, after spending thirteen seasons with FC Utrecht, Schut was the longest-serving player of any club in the Eredivisie.

By October 2011, Schut was the club captain of FC Utrecht.

== Personal life ==
In February 2015, Schut stated his desire to become a primary school teacher after retirement.

== Honours ==
Utrecht

- KNVB Cup: 2002–03, 2003–04
- Johan Cruyff Shield: 2004
