= MVV Maastricht =

Association football club in the Netherlands

- Full name: Maatschappelijke Voetbal Vereniging Maastricht
- Nicknames: Us MVV'ke (supporters & club); Sterrendragers (team)
- Founded: 2 April 1902; 124 years ago
- Ground: De Geusselt
- Capacity: 10,234
- Chairman: Tom Daemen
- Manager: Andries Jonker
- League: Eerste Divisie
- 2025–26: Eerste Divisie, 19th of 20
- Website: www.mvv.nl (in Dutch)
Home colours	Away colours

Maatschappelijke Voetbal Vereniging Maastricht (Dutch pronunciation: [maːtˈsxɑpələkə ˈvudbɑl vəˌreːnəɣɪŋ maːˈstrɪxt]), commonly known as MVV Maastricht ([ˌɛɱveːˈveː maːˈstrɪxt], Limburgish: [ˌæɱ˦veːˈveː məˈstʀeːx]) or simply as MVV, is a Dutch professional football club from the city of Maastricht. Founded on 2 April 1902, MVV Maastricht currently competes in the Eerste Divisie, the second tier of Dutch football.

Because their crest is based on the city's coat of arms, an armed angel holding a red shield with a white star, they are nicknamed de Sterrendragers ("Wearers of Stars") and, in local dialect, Us MVV'ke ("our little MVV", pronounced [ˈʏz ˌæɱveːˈveːkə]). The club's name was formerly Maastrichtse Voetbal Vereniging until 2011, when it was officially changed to include the city name after "MVV."

== History ==
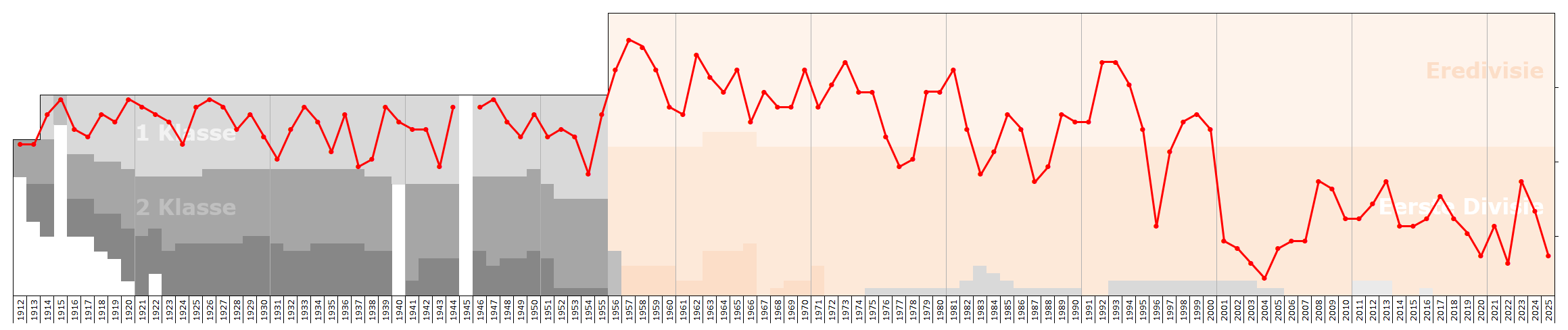
Historical chart of league performance

=== Foundation and early years (1902–1946) ===
MVV was founded in 1902 following a meeting held on Maastricht's Vrijthof square. Initially named Maastrichtsche Voetbal Club (MVC), the club changed its name several times before adopting the title Maastrichtse Voetbal Vereniging (MVV) in 1908.

From its formation until the mid-1970s, MVV competed in the top tiers of Dutch football. The club enjoyed several strong campaigns in the interwar period, finishing as national runners-up in 1927 and 1932, and recording further high finishes in 1936, 1939 and 1946. In 1946 the team won its regional league and progressed to the national championship play-offs, but finished bottom of the group.

During this period several MVV players gained international recognition. Bèr Felix, Sjo Soons and Jeu van Bun were all selected for the Netherlands national football team, a notable distinction at a time when the KNVB largely drew its players from clubs in the Randstad.

=== Professional era (1952–1969) ===
In 1952 MVV marked its 50th anniversary amid growing calls for the introduction of professional football in the Netherlands. Two years later the KNVB and the breakaway Nederlandse Beroeps Voetbalbond (NBVB) reached an agreement to merge their competitions, creating a national semi-professional league structure. MVV placed third in the final NBVB–KNVB qualification round and were admitted to the new Eredivisie.

The club enjoyed a sustained period in the top division during the 1950s and 1960s. Players such as Fons van Wissen, Giel Haenen and Gerard Bergholtz earned Dutch caps while at MVV, and in 1957 the Boschpoort ground was expanded to a capacity of 18,000 to meet rising demand. In 1961 the club relocated to the purpose-built De Geusselt stadium, and by 1969 total attendances for the season had reached 100,000.

To mark fifty years in the top flight in 1963, a supporters' committee presented MVV with 14 symbolic golden stars, which were occasionally incorporated into the club's shirts in place of the traditional white star from the Maastricht city crest. Results during the decade alternated between mid-table stability and relegation battles, with the club ultimately remaining in the Eredivisie throughout the period.

=== Rise of Willy Brokamp (1970–1974) ===
The signing of forward Willy Brokamp from nearby Chevremont in the late 1960s heralded one of the most successful eras in MVV's history. Making his Eredivisie debut at the age of 18, Brokamp established himself as one of the league's leading forwards. He was the Eredivisie's top scorer in 1973 and was named Dutch Footballer of the Year the same season. In total, Brokamp scored 141 goals in 11 seasons with MVV and won six international caps for the Netherlands while at the club.

=== Fluctuating fortunes (1974–2010) ===
Brokamp's departure to Ajax in 1974 was followed by MVV's first relegation in 1976. The club immediately challenged for promotion, narrowly missing out in their first season in the Eerste Divisie before returning to the top flight in 1978 via the promotion play-offs.

MVV remained a yo-yo club over the following decades. They achieved a famous 6–3 victory over Ajax at the De Meer Stadion in 1980, still the Amsterdam side's heaviest home defeat in league competition. Relegations in 1982 and 1986 were offset by championship wins in the second tier in 1984 and 1988, while the club achieved a seven-year stint in the Eredivisie between 1988 and 1995.

The mid-1980s were marked by severe financial pressures. By 1983, MVV carried debts of around 4.5 million guilders, leading chairman Max Tripels, a VVD member of parliament, to enlist businessman Léon Melchior to oversee a restructuring. With support from the municipality, ownership of the Geusselt ground was transferred to the club in 1986 and a subsidy of 3.7 million guilders was provided for redevelopment. Melchior subsequently proposed further investment, but resistance from entrenched figures in the club hierarchy curtailed his plans. The stadium was renovated rather than rebuilt, and his influence at MVV diminished.

During the late 1980s and early 1990s MVV established themselves in the Eredivisie, with players such as Erik Meijer and Erik Gerets gaining international recognition. Under coach Sef Vergoossen the team achieved back-to-back seventh-place finishes in 1992 and 1993 and were named KNVB "Team of the Year" for their attacking style.

=== Recent developments (2010–present) ===
In 2010, MVV officially changed its name to MVV Maastricht (Maatschappelijke Voetbal Vereniging Maastricht), introducing a new crest and board structure. That season the club began its Eerste Divisie campaign with an eight-point deduction due to financial irregularities, but nonetheless finished in mid-table.

Under coach René Trost, MVV challenged for promotion in the 2012–13 season, finishing fifth despite the annulment of results against bankrupt clubs AGOVV and Veendam. In 2016–17 the club reached the promotion play-off final, but were defeated by local rivals Roda JC Kerkrade.

By the early 2020s MVV remained an established second-tier club. In financial assessments by the KNVB the club was rated as "sufficient" in 2018, a marked improvement on its earlier struggles.

== Support and rivalries ==
A hardcore supporters' group known as the Angel Side emerged in the 1980s, taking its name from Maastricht's coat of arms. The group became associated with match-day disorder at venues around the country and its prominence has since diminished amid anti-hooliganism measures and fluctuating results.

Matches against Roda JC Kerkrade constitute MVV's principal rivalry within the Dutch province of Limburg. Despite a period without league meetings in the early 2000s, fixtures between the clubs have been accompanied by incidents involving sections of the hardcore support, and some player transfers between the clubs have drawn threats from supporters.

Supporter sources describe Roda JC as emphasising a Germanic and Limburgish identity—with German flags visible in home sections and the provincial anthem played before matches—while Maastricht is often characterised as having a more Latin, Burgundian civic identity.

Beyond Roda JC and Fortuna Sittard, MVV also contest regional or historical rivalries with Helmond Sport, VVV-Venlo and NEC Nijmegen.

== Stadium ==
In the early days MVV changed grounds often, starting by playing promotional games on the Vrijthof square. They moved to a cycling track on the edge of the city, before finally creating their own ground at the Boschpoort location. The stadium was given the same name. It is claimed that the first MVV players themselves raised the pasture to create a playable pitch. Later on stands were built, improved and enlarged during various periods in time.

In January 1962 they moved to their current ground at the Geusselt terrain. Again, the name of the location also became the name of the stadium. The Geusselt was restructured at different occasions. In a first major reconstruction the athletic track was removed, the pitch was turned 90 degrees and newly built seat-only stands reduced the capacity of the ground. In the new millennium the open corners of the stadium were closed and the last stand-only stand was replaced by a seat-only stand. Currently the stadium has a capacity of approximately 10,000.

== Honours ==
- Eerste Divisie
  - Winner: 1984, 1997
- Promoted to Eredivisie
  - Promotion: 1978, 1988
- UEFA Intertoto Cup
  - Winner: 1970

=== Results ===
Below is a table with MVV's domestic results since the introduction of professional football in 1956.

Domestic Results since 1956
Domestic league	League result	Qualification to	KNVB Cup season	Cup result
2024–25 Eerste Divisie	15th	–	2024–25	second round
2023–24 Eerste Divisie	9th	–	2023–24	first round
2022–23 Eerste Divisie	5th	promotion/relegation play-offs: no promotion	2022–23	first round
2021–22 Eerste Divisie	16th	–	2021–22	second round
2020–21 Eerste Divisie	11th	–	2020–21	round of 16
2019–20 Eerste Divisie	15th	–	2019–20	first round
2018–19 Eerste Divisie	12th	–	2018–19	first round
2017–18 Eerste Divisie	10th	promotion/relegation play-offs: no promotion	2017–18	first round
2016–17 Eerste Divisie	7th	promotion/relegation play-offs: no promotion	2016–17	first round
2015–16 Eerste Divisie	10th	–	2015–16	second round
2014–15 Eerste Divisie	11th	–	2014–15	third round
2013–14 Eerste Divisie	11th	–	2013–14	second round
2012–13 Eerste Divisie	5th	promotion/relegation play-offs: no promotion	2012–13	second round
2011–12 Eerste Divisie	8th	promotion/relegation play-offs: no promotion	2011–12	third round
2010–11 Eerste Divisie	10th	promotion/relegation play-offs: no promotion	2010–11	third round
2009–10 Eerste Divisie	10th	–	2009–10	second round
2008–09 Eerste Divisie	6th	promotion/relegation play-offs: no promotion	2008–09	second round
2007–08 Eerste Divisie	5th	promotion/relegation play-offs: no promotion	2007–08	third round
2006–07 Eerste Divisie	13th	–	2006–07	round of 16
2005–06 Eerste Divisie	13th	–	2005–06	quarter-final
2004–05 Eerste Divisie	14th	–	2004–05	first round
2003–04 Eerste Divisie	18th	–	2003–04	second round
2002–03 Eerste Divisie	16th	–	2002–03	third round
2001–02 Eerste Divisie	14th	–	2001–02	group stage
2000–01 Eerste Divisie	13th	–	2000–01	third round
1999–2000 Eredivisie	16th	Eerste Divisie (losing prom./releg. play-offs)	1999–00	second round
1998–99 Eredivisie	14th	–	1998–99	second round
1997–98 Eredivisie	15th	–	1997–98	second round
1996–97 Eerste Divisie	1st	Eredivisie (promotion)	1996–97	group stage
1995–96 Eerste Divisie	11th	–	1995–96	quarter-final
1994–95 Eredivisie	16th	Eerste Divisie (losing prom./releg. play-offs)	1994–95	second round
1993–94 Eredivisie	10th	–	1993–94	round of 16
1992–93 Eredivisie	7th	–	1992–93	round of 16
1991–92 Eredivisie	7th	–	1991–92	third round
1990–91 Eredivisie	15th	–	1990–91	second round
1989–90 Eredivisie	15th	–	1989–90	second round
1988–89 Eredivisie	14th	–	1988–89	second round
1987–88 Eerste Divisie	3rd	Eredivisie (winning promotion competition)	1987–88	second round
1986–87 Eerste Divisie	5th	–	1986–87	second round
1985–86 Eredivisie	16th	Eerste Divisie (relegation)	1985–86	first round
1984–85 Eredivisie	14th	–	1984–85	quarter-final
1983–84 Eerste Divisie	1st	Eredivisie (promotion)	1983–84	second round
1982–83 Eerste Divisie	4th	promotion competition: no promotion	1982–83	first round
1981–82 Eredivisie	16th	Eerste Divisie (relegation)	1981–82	round of 16
1980–81 Eredivisie	8th	–	1980–81	round of 16
1979–80 Eredivisie	11th	–	1979–80	second round
1978–79 Eredivisie	11th	–	1978–79	second round
1977–78 Eerste Divisie	2nd	Eredivisie (winning promotion competition)	1977–78	first round
1976–77 Eerste Divisie	3rd	promotion competition: no promotion	1976–77	quarter-final
1975–76 Eredivisie	17th	Eerste Divisie (relegation)	1975–76	second round
1974–75 Eredivisie	11th	–	1974–75	second round
1973–74 Eredivisie	11th	–	1973–74	second round
1972–73 Eredivisie	7th	–	1972–73	second round
1971–72 Eredivisie	10th	–	1971–72	round of 16
1970–71 Eredivisie	13th	–	1970–71	second round
1969–70 Eredivisie	8th	–	1969–70	round of 16
1968–69 Eredivisie	13th	–	1968–69	second round
1967–68 Eredivisie	13th	–	1967–68	round of 16
1966–67 Eredivisie	11th	–	1966–67	round of 16
1965–66 Eredivisie	15th	–	1965–66	round of 16
1964–65 Eredivisie	8th	–	1964–65	first round
1963–64 Eredivisie	11th	–	1963–64	first round
1962–63 Eredivisie	9th	–	1962–63	quarter-final
1961–62 Eredivisie	6th	–	1961–62	?
1960–61 Eredivisie	14th	–	1960–61	?
1959–60 Eredivisie	13th	–	not held	not held
1958–59 Eredivisie	8th	–	1958–59	?
1957–58 Eredivisie	5th	–	1957–58	?
1956–57 Eredivisie	4th	–	1956–57	?

== Players ==
=== Current squad ===
As of 30 September 2026

Note: Flags indicate national team as defined under FIFA eligibility rules; some limited exceptions apply. Players may hold more than one non-FIFA nationality.

No.	Pos.	Nation	Player
1	GK	NED	Hugo Wentges
2	DF	NED	Milan Hofland
3	DF	BEL	Wout Coomans
4	DF	CUW	Dylan Timber
5	DF	NED	Lars Schenk
6	DF	NED	Finn Dicke
7	FW	BEL	Lennerd Daneels
8	MF	BEL	Stan Van Dessel
9	FW	CRO	Toni Vinogradac
10	MF	BEL	Olivier Dumont
11	FW	NED	Thijme Verheijen
12	GK	NED	Sep van der Heijden
13	GK	NED	Sebastiaan Timmers
14	FW	BEL	Mats Kuipers
15	DF	NED	Djairo Tehubijuluw

No.	Pos.	Nation	Player
16	MF	NED	Robert Klaasen (captain)
17	MF	NED	Sil van der Wegen
18	MF	BEL	Elias Sierra
19	MF	NED	Mika Luijendijk (on loan from Excelsior)
20	MF	MAR	Amine Amgar
21	FW	NED	Delano Asante
22	DF	NED	Sven Bouland
23	GK	NED	Victor Goffings
24	MF	NED	Noa el Hamdaoui (on loan from Excelsior)
25	DF	NED	Yaël Liesdek
26	MF	BEL	Adriano Mansala-Mpudi
27	MF	NED	Naïm Matoug
29	FW	NED	Onesime Zimuangana
31	DF	MAR	Yanis Bourard

=== Out on loan ===
Note: Flags indicate national team as defined under FIFA eligibility rules; some limited exceptions apply. Players may hold more than one non-FIFA nationality.

No.	Pos.	Nation	Player
—	DF	BEL	Simon Francis (at Knokke until 30 June 2027)

== Club officials ==
As of 29 December 2025

Position	Staff
Manager	(Netherlands) Peter van den Berg
Assistant manager	(Belgium) Davy Heymans (Belgium) Peter Reynders
Goalkeeping coach	(Belgium) Gerry Oste
Team Manager	(Netherlands) Lei Bovens (Netherlands) John Sliepen

== Historical list of coaches ==
- (England) Harry Julian (1921-1927)
- (England) Fred Hatt (1927-1930)
- (England) Bill Julian (1931–34)
- (England) Bill Julian (1937)
- (England) Bill Julian (1938–40)
- (Netherlands) Wim Groenendijk (1945-48)
- (Austria) Viktor Havlicek (1948–56)
- (Germany) Rainer Hammers (1956–58)
- (Socialist Federal Republic of Yugoslavia) Branko Vidović (1958–59)
- (Germany) Rainer Hammers (1959–61)
- (Austria) Viktor Havlicek (1961–63)
- (Netherlands) Barend Braaksma (1963-64)
- (Netherlands) Charles Siezenis (1964-66)
- (Austria) Friedrich Donnenfeld (1966–68)
- (Netherlands) Jung Schlangen (1968-69)
- (Netherlands) George Knobel (1969–73)
- (Netherlands) Maarten Vink (1973)
- (Netherlands) Leo Canjels (1973–75)
- (Netherlands) André Maas (1975–76)
- (Netherlands) George Knobel (1976–78)
- (Netherlands) Leo Steegman (1978–81)
- (Netherlands) Cor van der Hart (1980–81)
- (Germany) Friedel Rausch (1982–83)
- (Netherlands) Jo Bonfrère (1983)
- (Netherlands) Clemens Westerhof (1983–84)
- (Wales) Barry Hughes (1984–85)
- (Netherlands) Jo Bonfrère (1985)
- (Netherlands) Cor Brom (1985)
- (Netherlands) Pim van de Meent (1985–86)
- (Netherlands) Frans Körver (1986–89)
- (Netherlands) Sef Vergoossen (1989–95)
- (Netherlands) Jan Reker (1995–95)
- (Netherlands) Frans Körver (1995–98)
- (Netherlands) Wim Koevermans (1998–2000)
- (Netherlands) Roger Reijners (2000–02)
- (Netherlands) Ron Elsen (2002–03) (caretaker)
- (Netherlands) Jan van Deinsen (2003–04)
- (Netherlands) Rob Delahaye (2004) (caretaker)
- (Netherlands) Andries Jonker (2004–06)
- (Netherlands) Jurrie Koolhof (2006–07)
- (Netherlands) Ron Elsen (2007) (caretaker)
- (Netherlands) Rob Delahaye (2007) (caretaker)
- (Netherlands) Robert Maaskant (2007–08)
- (Turkey) Fuat Çapa (2008–10)
- (Netherlands) Paul Meulenberg (2010) (caretaker)
- (Netherlands) Ron Elsen (2010) (caretaker)
- (Netherlands) René Trost (2010–13)
- (Netherlands) Tiny Ruys (2013)
- (Netherlands) Edwin Hermans / Ron Elsen (2013–14)
- (Netherlands) Ron Elsen (2014–19)
- (Turkey) Fuat Usta (2019–20)
- (Bosnia and Herzegovina) Darije Kalezić (2020–21)
- (Netherlands) Klaas Wels (2021–2022)
- (Netherlands) Maurice Verberne (2022–24)
- (Netherlands) Edwin Hermans (2024–25)
- (Belgium) Davy Heymans (2025) (caretaker)
- (Netherlands) Peter van den Berg (2025–present)
