= Jordy Zuidam =

Dutch footballer (born 1980)

Personal information
- Date of birth: 8 July 1980 (age 46)
- Place of birth: Utrecht, Netherlands
- Height: 1.81 m (5 ft 11 in)
- Position: Midfielder

Youth career
- SV Houten
- RUC
- FC Utrecht

Senior career*
Years	Team	Apps	(Gls)
1998–2005	FC Utrecht	73	(0)
2000–2002	→ Go Ahead Eagles (loan)	41	(6)
2005–2008	FC Zwolle	79	(6)
2008–2010	Go Ahead Eagles	44	(0)
2010–2011	→ RBC Roosendaal (loan)	29	(2)
2010–2013	Katwijk		
- * Club domestic league appearances and goals as of 29 May 2013 (UTC)

Jordy Zuidam (born 8 July 1980) is a Dutch former professional footballer who played as a midfielder.

Zuidam was born in Utrecht. During his football career, he played for FC Utrecht, Go Ahead Eagles and FC Zwolle, before he started playing for Katwijk in the Dutch Topklasse. In May 2013, Zuidam stopped playing football and started a new career as head scouting for his former team FC Utrecht.

== Honours ==
Utrecht

- KNVB Cup: 2002–03, 2003–04
- Johan Cruyff Shield: 2004
