= Bill Julian =

English footballer and manager

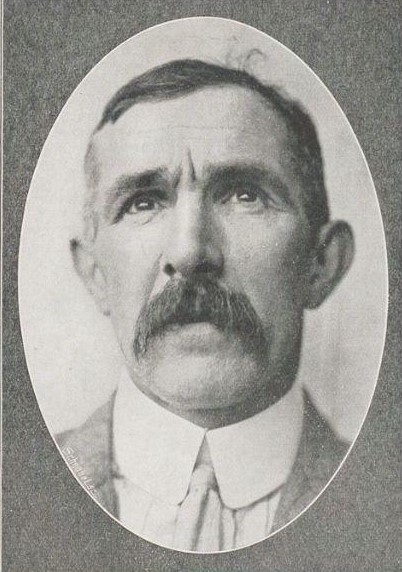
- Julian in 1912

Personal information
- Full name: John William Julian
- Date of birth: 10 July 1867
- Place of birth: Boston, Lincolnshire, England
- Date of death: 14 March 1957 (aged 89)
- Place of death: Enfield, London, England
- Position: Wing half

Senior career*
Years	Team	Apps	(Gls)
–1885	Boston Excelsior		
1885–1889	Boston		
1889–1892	Royal Arsenal		
1892–1894	Luton Town		
1894–1895	Tottenham Hotspur		
1895–1896	Dartford		
- Shepherd's Bush

Managerial career
- 1895: British Ladies' Football Club
- 1909–1912: HFC
- * Club domestic league appearances and goals

John William Julian (10 July 1867 – 14 March 1957) was an English football player and coach.

== Career ==
Born in Boston, Lincolnshire, he first played for his local side Boston Excelsior, then Boston. He impressed in a home match for Boston Town against Royal Arsenal on Good Friday in 1889, and Arsenal then arranged a job for him at the Royal Arsenal factory so that he could play for their team. He played in Arsenal's very first FA Cup tie, against Lyndhurst on 5 October 1889, and soon earned a reputation as a determined and tough-tackling wing-half. He became club captain in 1890, and was still captain when Arsenal turned professional in 1891.

However, he was replaced as Arsenal captain in October 1891 by new arrival Sandy Robertson (who had previously played for Preston North End's 1888–89 Double-winning side), and although assured of a place in the first team, he decided to step down to the reserves. In total, he played 4 FA Cup ties and 71 other senior matches for Woolwich Arsenal. In the summer of 1892, he moved to Luton Town, to become the club's captain and coach.

After two years at Luton, he joined Tottenham Hotspur (thus making him the first person to play for both Spurs and Arsenal, albeit long before the latter moved to north London in 1913), and played in Spurs' very first FA Cup tie, a first qualifying match against West Hertfordshire, on 13 October 1894; Spurs won 3–2. He left Tottenham in 1895, to play for Dartford, before finishing his career at Shepherd's Bush. He later opened a sports shop in Plumstead and became the first British ladies team coach in 1895. Julian remained loyal to Woolwich Arsenal, going back to work for the club during the Boer War.

Julian retained his footballing ties after retiring from playing, and in 1909 he moved to the Netherlands to coach there, later followed by his sons Bill and Harry, who both coached a number of teams in the Netherlands. Julian acted as head coach of HFC from 1909 until 1912. He stayed with HFC but from then on, he was assistant-coach / groundsman / caretaker, before he returned to England in 1915 to live in Enfield, London.

He was one of the longest-surviving members of Arsenal's first professional side, along with Gavin Crawford and Jack McBean. The three were reunited at an Arsenal game against Chelsea on 20 March 1948 (by which time Arsenal were one of the leading sides in English football), an event recorded in The Official Illustrated History of Arsenal. He lived until the age of 89, dying in Enfield in 1957, outliving both Crawford and McBean to make him the last surviving member of Arsenal's first professional team.

== Personal life ==
Julian married Edith Emerson in July 1888. They had three sons and a daughter. He died in Enfield in 1957.

== Honours ==
Arsenal

- London Cup
- London Charity Cup
- Kent Charity Cup
