= 2001–02 Eerste Divisie =

46th season of the second-tier football league in Netherlands

Eerste Divisie
- Season: 2001–02
- Champions: FC Zwolle
- Promoted: FC Zwolle; RBC Roosendaal; Excelsior
- Goals: 965
- Average goals/game: 3.15

The Dutch Eerste Divisie in the 2001–02 season was contested by 18 teams. FC Zwolle won the championship.

== Promoted teams ==
These teams were promoted to the Eredivisie

- Zwolle — Eerste Divisie champions
- RBC Roosendaal — playoff Group A winners
- Excelsior Rotterdam — playoff Group B winners

== New entrants ==
Relegated from the 2000–01 Eredivisie

- RBC Roosendaal

Telstar merged with Stormvogels this season to form Stormvogels/Telstar

== League standings ==
Pos	Team	Pld	W	D	L	GF	GA	GD	Pts	Promotion or qualification
1	FC Zwolle	34	22	7	5	65	36	+29	73	Champion, promoted to the Eredivisie
2	Excelsior	34	21	7	6	73	31	+42	70	Promoted to the Eredivisie following play-offs
3	RBC Roosendaal	34	21	5	8	76	40	+36	68	Promoted to the Eredivisie following play-offs
4	ADO Den Haag	34	18	9	7	53	36	+17	63	Qualified for play-offs
5	FC Emmen	34	17	8	9	53	43	+10	59	Qualified for play-offs
6	FC Volendam	34	15	8	11	66	48	+18	53	Qualified for play-offs
7	Cambuur Leeuwarden	34	15	6	13	50	42	+8	51	Qualified for play-offs
8	Heracles Almelo	34	14	6	14	52	51	+1	48	
9	Stormvogels/Telstar	34	12	9	13	55	49	+6	45	
10	Dordrecht '90	34	12	9	13	66	66	0	45	
11	Veendam	34	13	6	15	60	62	−2	45	
12	HFC Haarlem	34	10	8	16	37	46	−9	38	
13	VVV-Venlo	34	11	5	18	51	64	−13	38	
14	MVV	34	10	7	17	49	61	−12	37	
15	Helmond Sport	34	8	13	13	34	51	−17	37	
16	Go Ahead Eagles	34	9	9	16	48	62	−14	36	
17	FC Eindhoven	34	8	7	19	52	77	−25	31	
18	TOP Oss	34	3	5	26	25	100	−75	14	

Source: rsssf.com

== Playoff standings ==
Group A
Pos	Team	Pld	W	D	L	GF	GA	GD	Pts	Promotion or relegation
1	RBC Roosendaal	6	4	2	0	15	6	+9	14	Promoted
2	FC Den Bosch	6	4	1	1	17	9	+8	13	Relegated
3	FC Emmen	6	1	1	4	10	15	−5	4	
4	Cambuur Leeuwarden	6	1	0	5	8	20	−12	3	

Source: rsssf.com

Group B
Pos	Team	Pld	W	D	L	GF	GA	GD	Pts	Promotion or relegation
1	Excelsior	6	3	1	2	10	8	+2	10	Promoted
2	FC Volendam	6	3	0	3	10	14	−4	9	
3	ADO Den Haag	6	2	2	2	13	9	+4	8	
4	Sparta Rotterdam	6	2	1	3	10	12	−2	7	Relegated

Source: rsssf.com

== Attendances ==
#	Club	Average
1	Emmen	5,789
2	Cambuur	5,065
3	Heracles	4,615
4	ADO	4,484
5	Zwolle	4,230
6	Veendam	3,973
7	RBC	3,933
8	Go Ahead	3,224
9	MVV	3,015
10	Volendam	2,625
11	Excelsior	2,067
12	VVV	1,844
13	Helmond	1,744
14	Oss	1,671
15	Haarlem	1,628
16	Dordrecht	1,597
17	Eindhoven	1,592
18	Telstar	1,423

== See also ==
- 2001–02 Eredivisie
- 2001–02 KNVB Cup
