= Darl Douglas =

Surinamese footballer (born 1979)

Personal information
- Date of birth: 5 October 1979 (age 47)
- Place of birth: Paramaribo, Suriname
- Height: 1.72 m (5 ft 8 in)
- Position: Winger

Youth career
- DWS
- Ajax

Senior career*
Years	Team	Apps	(Gls)
1999–2003	Ajax	0	(0)
2000–2001	→ RBC (loan)	13	(0)
2001–2003	→ Haarlem (loan)	65	(11)
2003–2004	Heracles	33	(9)
2004–2007	Utrecht	69	(4)
2007	Marítimo	13	(1)
2007–2008	Willem II	16	(1)
2008–2012	Heracles	114	(8)
Total		323	(34)

International career
1995-1996	Netherlands U17	6	(2)
1996-1997	Netherlands U18	7	(0)
- * Club domestic league appearances and goals

Darl Douglas (born 5 October 1979) is a Surinam-born Dutch retired footballer who played as a winger.

== Club career ==
After coming through the Ajax' youth system, Douglas played professionally for RBC, Haarlem, Heracles and FC Utrecht, before moving abroad to join Portuguese side Marítimo. He returned to Holland after only a few months and played for Willem II, before finishing his career after a second spell with Heracles Almelo.

== International career ==
Douglas played 7 games for the Netherlands national under-18 football team and 6 for the U17s.

== Personal life ==
Douglas built his own music recording studio next to his house and owned a record label, Dredda Records. In summer 2014, he moved back to Suriname with his record label. He produces under his alter ego Jah Decko.

== Honours ==
Utrecht

- Johan Cruyff Shield: 2004
