= René Ponk =

Dutch footballer and coach (born 1971)

Personal information
- Full name: René Ponk
- Date of birth: 21 October 1971 (age 55)
- Place of birth: Amsterdam, Netherlands
- Height: 1.89 m (6 ft 2 1/2 in)
- Position: Goalkeeper

Senior career*
Years	Team	Apps	(Gls)
1994–1995	Utrecht	5	(0)
1995–1996	VVV	32	(0)
1996–1997	Utrecht	22	(0)
1997–2000	Compostela	43	(0)
2000–2001	Dordrecht	32	(0)
2001–2005	Utrecht	52	(0)
2005–2007	Sparta Rotterdam	41	(0)
2007–2009	Haarlem	28	(0)
Total		255	(0)
- * Club domestic league appearances and goals

René Ponk (born 21 October 1971 in Amsterdam) is a Dutch retired footballer who played as a goalkeeper.

== Football career ==
In a professional career which lasted 15 years Ponk appeared in Eredivisie games 120 over the course of eight seasons, with FC Utrecht (six) and Sparta Rotterdam (two). He also competed in Spain with SD Compostela for three years, playing 19 matches in his only campaign in La Liga and suffering team relegation.

Ponk retired in June 2009 at almost 38 years of age, after two seasons with HFC Haarlem in the second division. He subsequently worked as a goalkeeper coach.

== Honours ==
Utrecht

- KNVB Cup: 2003–04
- Johan Cruyff Shield: 2004
