= Viktor Havlicek =

Austrian footballer and manager

Personal information
- Date of birth: 16 July 1914
- Place of birth: Austria-Hungary
- Date of death: 22 October 1971 (aged 57)
- Position: Goalkeeper

Senior career*
Years	Team	Apps	(Gls)
1932–1938	First Vienna FC		
1938–1939	Phönix Karlsruhe		
1940	→ Kickers Offenbach (guest)		
1942–1946	Phönix Karlsruhe		

International career
1935–1936	Austria	3	(0)

Managerial career
- 1947–1948: Alemannia Aachen
- 1948–1956: MVV
- 1956–1958: Rapid JC
- 1958–1960: Belgium (trainer)
- 1960–1961: Royal Antwerp
- 1961–1963: MVV
- * Club domestic league appearances and goals

Viktor Havlicek (16 July 1914 - 22 October 1971) was an Austrian footballer and football manager. He played for First Vienna FC, Phönix Karlsruhe and, as a wartime guest player, Kickers Offenbach and gained 3 caps for Austria. His brother was Eduard "Edy" Havlicek.

He spent the majority of his coaching career in Germany and the Netherlands with Alemannia Aachen, MVV, Roda JC.

From 1958 to 1960, he coached Belgium, Constant Vanden Stock being the manager.
