= Bill Julian (football manager) =

English footballer and manager

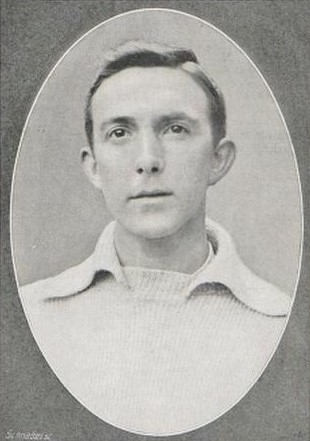
- Julian in 1913

Personal information
- Full name: Joseph William Julian
- Date of birth: 18 April 1889
- Place of birth: Boston, Lincolnshire, England
- Date of death: 10 November 1957 (aged 68)
- Place of death: Edmonton, London, England
- Position: Midfielder

Senior career*
Years	Team	Apps	(Gls)
- Boston

Managerial career
- 1912–1913: HBS
- 1913–1914: UVV
- 1919–1921: HBS
- 1921–1922: Feyenoord
- 1922: NAC Breda
- 1922–1924: RCH
- 1927–1928: AGOVV
- 1931–1934: MVV Maastricht
- 1936–1937: Willem II
- 1939–1940: NEC
- * Club domestic league appearances and goals

Joseph William Julian (18 April 1889 – 10 November 1957) was an English football manager. After his playing career was cut short by injury, he became known for his lengthy stint managing clubs in the Netherlands, including Feyenoord, NAC Breda, NEC, MVV Maastricht and Willem II, among others.

== Career ==
Julian began his playing career in the mid-1900s with his hometown club Boston. He reportedly had a trial with Tottenham Hotspur, but in 1910, suffered a career ending ankle injury.

In 1912, he moved to the Netherlands, where his father (also named Bill) had been coaching for the past four years. He managed HBS and UVV for a season each, before the outbreak of the First World War. He returned to the Netherlands in 1919 to manage HBS again, and in 1921, became Feyenoord's first known manager. However, Feyenoord was unable to pay his wages, so he signed a short-term deal with NAC Breda. From 1922 to 1924, he was the manager of RCH, winning the Football League Championship in his first season, having topped the Eerste Klasse West to get there. In the mid-1920s, Julian guest trained AGOVV and he was named manager of the club for the 1927–28 season. In 1930, he also guest trained MVV Maastricht, and was named manager the following season. His younger brother Harry had managed the club in the early 1920s. Towards the end of the decade, Julian managed Willem II (another club that he had guest trained in the past) and NEC. He moved back to England via the Belgian coastal city of Ostend during the Second World War; Nijmegen became the first Dutch city to be occupied by the Germans. Julian again returned to the Netherlands where he coached RFC Roermond and Hercules.

While Julian was managing in the Netherlands, it was not uncommon for coaches to train other clubs on a part-time basis. Julian was no exception to this rule, and over the course of many years, he guest trained a multitude of clubs. This included: Alcmaria Victrix, AZC (twice), Be Quick, Friesland, Groene Ster, GVAV, Helder (numerous times), Maurits, NOAD (twice), Quick 1888, RFC Roermond (numerous times), VVV, vv Tegelen, WGW, Wilhelm and Willem II. In the 1930s, he headed the Roman Catholic Limburg Football Association, which allowed him to coach clubs of Catholic origin.

Julian eventually returned to England, where he continued his coaching career with Barking, Stevenage Town, and through links with British Railway Sports, Wolverton. He also worked under the FA coaching scheme for schools in Berkshire, Buckinghamshire, Hertfordshire and Middlesex.

== Honours ==
RCH

- Football League Championship: 1922–23
- Eerste Klasse West: 1922–23

WGW

- Eerste Klasse (North Holland): 1925–26
