= Eduard Havlicek =

Austrian football manager (born 1912)

Personal information
- Date of birth: 20 February 1912
- Place of birth: Vienna, Austria-Hungary
- Position: Goalkeeper

Managerial career
- Years: Team
- 1948–1950: Borussia Dortmund
- 1950–1953: STV Horst Emscher
- 1953–1954: Stuttgarter Kickers
- 1955: Luxembourg
- 1955–1957: Borussia Neunkirchen
- 1957–1958: FC Singen 04
- Stade Dudelange
- TuS Eving-Lindenhorst
- Union Ohligs

Eduard "Edy" Havlicek (born 20 February 1912, date of death unknown) was an Austrian footballer and football manager. His brother was Viktor Havlicek.

He spent the majority of his coaching career in Germany with Borussia Dortmund, STV Horst Emscher, Stuttgarter Kickers, Borussia Neunkirchen, FC Singen 04, TuS Eving-Lindenhorst and Union Ohligs. He also had a spell with Luxembourg and Stade Dudelange.
