= 2003–04 Eerste Divisie =

48th season of the second-tier football league in Netherlands

Eerste Divisie
- Season: 2003–04
- Champions: FC Den Bosch
- Promoted: FC Den Bosch; De Graafschap
- Goals: 1,091
- Average goals/game: 3.19
- Top goalscorer: Klaas-Jan Huntelaar (26)

The Dutch Eerste Divisie in the 2003–04 season was contested by 19 teams, one more than in the previous season. This was due to AGOVV Apeldoorn entering from the amateurs. FC Den Bosch won the championship.

== Promoted Teams ==
These teams were promoted to the Eredivisie

- Den Bosch — Eerste Divisie champions
- De Graafschap — playoff winners

== New entrants ==
Entering from amateur football

- AGOVV Apeldoorn

Relegated from the 2002–03 Eredivisie

- Excelsior
- De Graafschap

== League standings ==
Pos	Team	Pld	W	D	L	GF	GA	GD	Pts	Promotion or qualification
1	FC Den Bosch	36	22	8	6	85	48	+37	74	Champion, promoted to the Eredivisie
2	Excelsior	36	22	8	6	70	39	+31	74	Qualified for play-offs
3	Sparta Rotterdam	36	21	6	9	76	43	+33	69	Qualified for play-offs
4	Heracles Almelo	36	19	10	7	71	42	+29	67	Qualified for play-offs
5	Helmond Sport	36	19	8	9	66	42	+24	65	Qualified for play-offs
6	De Graafschap	36	18	10	8	63	43	+20	64	Promoted to the Eredivisie following play-offs
7	VVV-Venlo	36	19	4	13	76	62	+14	61	Qualified for play-offs
8	FC Emmen	36	17	10	9	65	54	+11	61	
9	Go Ahead Eagles	36	15	8	13	79	63	+16	53	
10	AGOVV Apeldoorn	36	14	8	14	63	54	+9	50	
11	TOP Oss	36	12	9	15	57	60	−3	45	
12	Stormvogels/Telstar	36	12	8	16	55	62	−7	44	
13	HFC Haarlem	36	10	9	17	41	63	−22	39	
14	Veendam	36	7	15	14	46	71	−25	36	
15	FC Dordrecht	36	5	15	16	33	60	−27	30	
16	FC Eindhoven	36	6	12	18	40	69	−29	30	
17	Cambuur Leeuwarden	36	6	10	20	35	65	−30	28	
18	MVV	36	6	10	20	32	70	−38	28	
19	Fortuna Sittard	36	3	10	23	38	81	−43	19	

Source: rsssf.com

== Playoff standings ==
Group A
Pos	Team	Pld	W	D	L	GF	GA	GD	Pts	Qualification
1	Vitesse Arnhem	6	4	2	0	14	4	+10	14	Group Champion
2	VVV-Venlo	6	2	2	2	11	10	+1	8	
3	Sparta Rotterdam	6	1	3	2	8	10	−2	6	
4	Helmond Sport	6	0	3	3	7	16	−9	3	

Source: rsssf.com

Group B
Pos	Team	Pld	W	D	L	GF	GA	GD	Pts	Promotion
1	De Graafschap	6	4	1	1	10	4	+6	13	Group Champion, Promoted
2	Heracles Almelo	6	3	2	1	11	6	+5	11	
3	Excelsior	6	2	2	2	8	8	0	8	
4	FC Volendam	6	0	1	5	4	15	−11	1	

Source: rsssf.com

== Attendances ==
#	Club	Average
1	De Graafschap	8,742
2	Emmen	5,191
3	Heracles	5,072
4	Sparta	4,532
5	Den Bosch	3,748
6	VVV	3,566
7	Helmond	3,463
8	MVV	3,410
9	Cambuur	3,353
10	Go Ahead	3,266
11	Veendam	3,185
12	Fortuna	2,928
13	AGOVV	2,136
14	Haarlem	1,989
15	Excelsior	1,910
16	Eindhoven	1,851
17	Telstar	1,607
18	Oss	1,593
19	Dordrecht	1,351

== See also ==
- 2003–04 Eredivisie
- 2003–04 KNVB Cup
