= 2001–02 KNVB Cup =

Tournament details
- Country: Netherlands
- Teams: 86

Final positions
- Champions: Ajax
- Runners-up: Utrecht

Tournament statistics
- Top goal scorer(s): Peter van Vossen; Niki Leferink (6 goals)

The 2001–02 edition of the KNVB Cup (at the time called Amstel Cup) was the 84th edition of the Dutch national football annual knockout tournament for the KNVB Cup. 86 teams contested, beginning on 4 August 2001 and ending at the final on 12 May 2002.

Ajax beat Utrecht 3–2 and received the cup for the fifteenth time.

== Teams ==
- All 18 participants of the Eredivisie 2001-02: six teams entered in the round of 16 of the knock-out stage; two in the first round of the knock-out stage and the rest in the group stage.
- All 18 participants of the Eerste Divisie 2001-02
- 48 teams from lower (amateur) leagues
- Two reserve teams

== Group stage ==
The matches of the group stage were played between August 4 and 22 2001. 78 teams played a total of 114 matches, 38 teams progressed to the next round.

Group 1
Team	Pts
1. AZ_{E}	9
2. HFC Haarlem_{1}	4
3. AFC '34_{A}	4
4. VV Noordwijk_{A}	0

Group 2
Team	Pts
1. Young Ajax	9
2. SV Huizen_{A}	6
3. FC Volendam_{1}	3
4. ADO '20_{A}	0

Group 3
Team	Pts
1. Stormvogels Telstar_{1}	6
2. FC Omniworld_{A}	5
3. KBV Amsterdam_{A}	2
4. FC Lisse_{A}	2

Group 4
Team	Pts
1. ADO Den Haag_{1}	9
2. Sparta_{E}	6
3. SVV Scheveningen_{A}	3
4. FC Kranenburg_{A}	0

Group 5
Team	Pts
1. Excelsior _{1}	6
2. SV Argon _{A}	6
3. VV Ter Leede _{A}	3
4. VV Katwijk _{A}	3

Group 6
Team	Pts
1. RBC Roosendaal _{1}	9
2. VV Kloetinge _{A}	3
3. VV Terneuzen _{A}	3
4. HSV Hoek _{A}	3

Group 7
Team	Pts
1. NAC Breda _{E}	6
2. SV Deltasport _{A}	3
3. SVVSMC _{A}	0

Group 8
Team	Pts
1. Willem II _{E}	9
2. VV DOVO _{A}	4
3. VV Baronie _{A}	3
4. Zwart-Wit '28 _{A}	1

Group 9
Team	Pts
1. Dordrecht'90 _{1}	9
2. FC Eindhoven _{1}	6
3. JVC '31 _{A}	1
4. Schijndel _{A}	1

Group 10
Team	Pts
1. Young PSV	9
2. VV Gemert _{A}	4
3. Helmond Sport _{1}	4
4. SV Panningen _{A}	0

Group 11
Team	Pts
1. RKVV IVS _{A}	7
2. Fortuna Sittard _{E}	6
3. MVV _{1}	4
4. EHC/Villa Nova _{A}	0

Group 12
Team	Pts
1. FC Den Bosch _{E}	7
2. SV Capelle _{A}	4
3. ASWH _{A}	3
4. RKSV UDI '19 _{A}	2

Group 13
Team	Pts
1. VV Bennekom _{A}	4
2. VVV-Venlo _{1}	4
3. TOP Oss _{1}	4
4. SV TOP _{A}	4

Group 14
Team	Pts
1. SV Spakenburg _{A}	4
2. NEC _{E}	4
3. De Treffers KERGO _{A}	0

Group 15
Team	Pts
1. Vitesse Arnhem _{E}	9
2. RKHVV _{A}	4
3. VV Sparta Nijkerk _{A}	4
4. VVOG _{A}	0

Group 16
Team	Pts
1. De Graafschap _{E}	9
2. Heracles Almelo _{1}	6
3. Be Quick '28 _{A}	3
4. HSC '21 _{A}	0

Group 17
Team	Pts
1. AGOVV Apeldoorn _{A}	9
2. Go Ahead Eagles _{1}	6
3. KVV Quick '20 _{A}	3
4. Flevo Boys _{A}	0

Group 18
Team	Pts
1. FC Emmen _{1}	7
2. FC Zwolle _{1}	6
3. Achilles 1894 _{A}	4
4. SV Urk _{A}	0

Group 19
Team	Pts
1. Cambuur Leeuw. _{1}	9
2. ACV _{A}	4
3. Harkemase Boys _{A}	3
4. VV Appingedam _{A}	1

Group 20
Team	Pts
1. FC Groningen _{E}	9
2. BV Veendam _{1}	4
3. Be Quick 1887 _{A}	4
4. Drachtster Boys _{A}	0

_{E} Eredivisie; _{1} Eerste Divisie; _{A} Amateur teams

== Knock-out phase ==
=== First round ===
The matches of the first round were played on 18-20 September 2001. sc Heerenveen and RKC Waalwijk entered the tournament this round. During the group stage, they were still active in the Intertoto Cup.

Home team	Result	Away team
Heracles Almelo	1–2	Cambuur Leeuwarden
RKC Waalwijk _{E}	5–0	VV Bennekom
Stormvogels Telstar	4–1	SV Argon
FC Emmen	1–0	RKHVV
sc Heerenveen _{E}	0–0 (p: 5-3)	Willem II
FC Zwolle	3–1	AGOVV
FC Eindhoven	1–0	Young PSV
FC Den Bosch	2–0	FC Omniworld (on September 25)
VV Gemert	0–3	Excelsior (on September 26)
De Graafschap	2–1 (gg)	Sparta (on October 3)

Home team	Result	Away team
FC Dordrecht	3–2 (gg)	SV Capelle
RBC Roosendaal	3–0	VV DOVO
Fortuna Sittard	2–1 (gg)	Vitesse Arnhem
VVV-Venlo	2–0	ADO Den Haag
Young Ajax	4–0	HFC Haarlem
VV Kloetinge	1–4	FC Groningen
ACV	1–0	RKVV IVS
NAC Breda	3–0	SV Huizen
Go Ahead Eagles	1–2	AZ
SV Spakenburg	1–2	BV Veendam

_{E} two Eredivisie entrants

=== Second round ===
The matches of the second round were played between 23 October and 6 November 2001.

Home team	Result	Away team
Young Ajax	2–0	De Graafschap
RKC Waalwijk	1–0	FC Emmen
FC Groningen	7–1	ACV
FC Den Bosch	4–3	VVV-Venlo
NAC Breda	0–1 (gg)	Excelsior
Stormvogels Telstar	3–0	FC Dordrecht
FC Zwolle	6–3	FC Eindhoven
RBC Roosendaal	3–2	AZ
Fortuna Sittard	2–1	Cambuur Leeuwarden
BV Veendam	0–2	sc Heerenveen

=== Round of 16 ===
The matches of the round of 16 were played on 11-12 December 2001. The six Eredivisie teams that had been playing in European competitions after qualification last season, entered the tournament this round.

Home team	Result	Away team
Stormvogels Telstar	1–0	Fortuna Sittard
FC Utrecht _{E}	4–1	Excelsior
Roda JC _{E}	0–1	sc Heerenveen
Young Ajax	2–1 (gg)	FC Twente _{E}
FC Groningen	3–0	FC Zwolle
Feyenoord _{E}	2–0	FC Den Bosch
RKC Waalwijk	1–2 (gg)	PSV _{E}
Ajax _{E}	4–3 (gg)	RBC Roosendaal

_{E} six Eredivisie entrants

=== Quarter-finals ===
The matches of the quarter finals were played on 31 January 31 and 7 February 2002.

Home team	Result	Away team
PSV	1–1 (p: 7-6)	Feyenoord
FC Utrecht	3–1	SC Heerenveen
Young Ajax	3–0	Stormvogels Telstar
Ajax	4–0	FC Groningen

=== Semi-finals ===
The matches of the semi-finals were played on 29 March and 10 April 2002.

Home team	Result	Away team
Young Ajax	2–2 (p: 6-7)	Utrecht
Ajax	3–0	PSV

=== Final ===
12 May 2002
18:00 CEST

Utrecht	2–3 (gg)	Ajax
Gluščević 56', 76' (pen.)		Mido 21'; Wamberto 90'; Ibrahimović 93'

De Kuip, Rotterdam
Attendance: 37,000
Referee: René Temmink

Ajax was granted a life line by a late offside goal by Wamberto sending the game into extra time, the linesman later admitting the mistake saying he had a black out. Ajax also won the Dutch Eredivisie championship, thereby taking the double. They would participate in the Champions League, so finalists FC Utrecht could play in the UEFA Cup.
