= Boschpoort =

Neighbourhood in Maastricht, Netherlands

Coordinates: 50.8631°N 5.6894°E

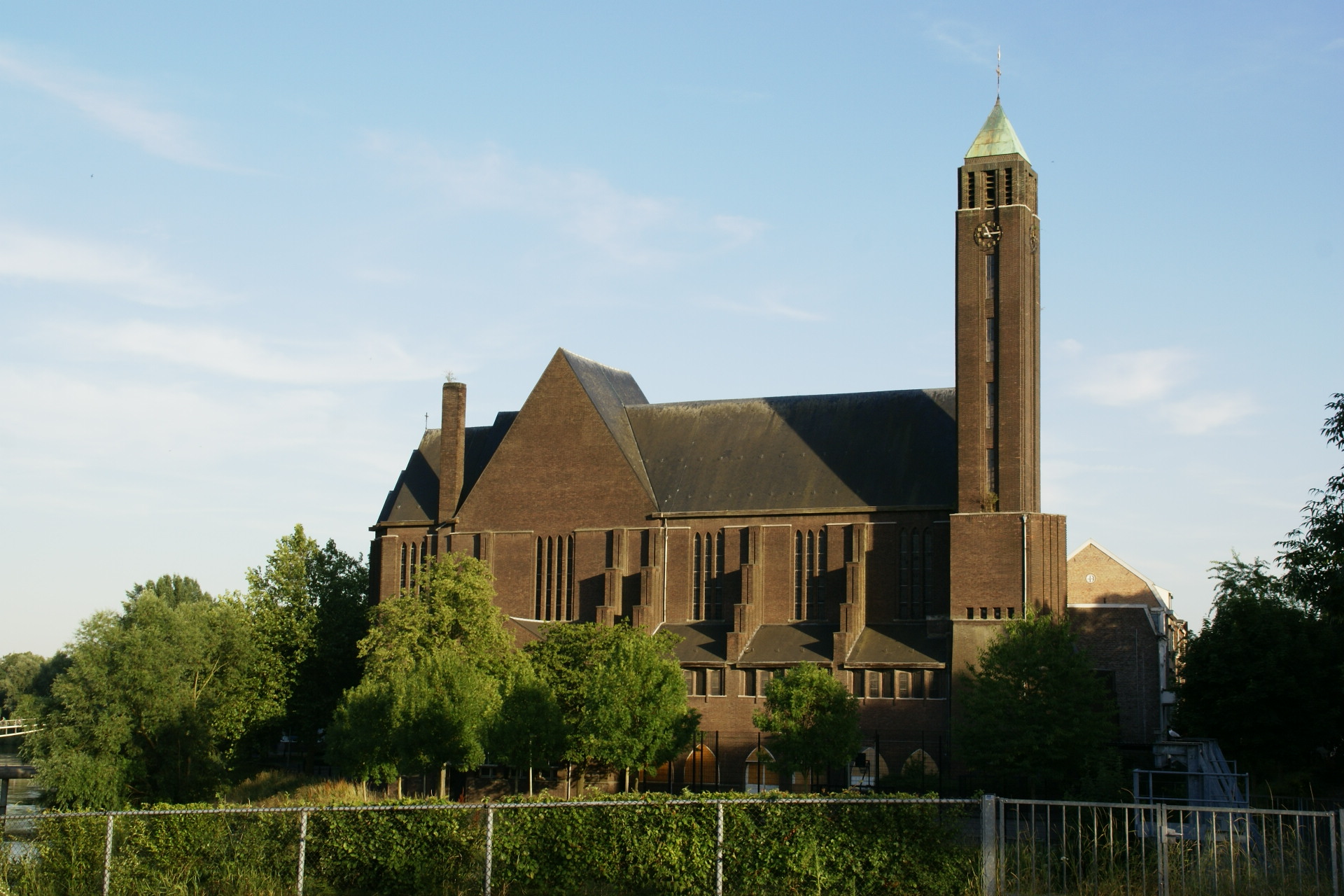
Church of Saint Hubert, Boschpoort

Boschpoort (Dutch: [ˈbɔsˌpoːrt], Limburgish: [ˈbɔsˌpoːʀt˦]) is a neighbourhood of Maastricht in the Dutch province of Limburg. The suburb is situated in the North Western area of the town, on the West bank of the river Meuse. The Dörp (pronounced [ˈdœʀ˦əp]; "village") as it is colloquially known is home to approximately 1500 people.

== History ==
The neighbourhood took its name from the old Boschpoort (English: Den Bosch Gate), one of the seven former city gates of Maastricht. The Boschpoort gate and the outlying defense works were demolished in the 1860s when Maastricht ceased to be a fortress town.

The Boschpoort neighbourhood was built slightly North of the old city gate in the early twentieth century. It was largely a working class neighbourhood, being close to the Sphinx potteries, the paper factory and other industries around the Bassin inner harbour and the Zuid-Willemsvaart canal. After the Second World War some new areas were added.

== Recent history ==
Populationwise, the area has been in decline for several decades. The Roman Catholic church of Saint Hubert, an imposing expressionist building dating from the 1920s, was sold in 2009 after having stood empty for several years and has been converted into a fitness centre. The local primary school was closed in 2010 after an intense and emotional fight by locals and parents to keep it open.

It is hoped that the neighbourhood will benefit from plans for regeneration of the industrial North Western part of Maastricht (Belvédère Project).
