= Mihai Neșu =

Romanian former footballer and philanthropist

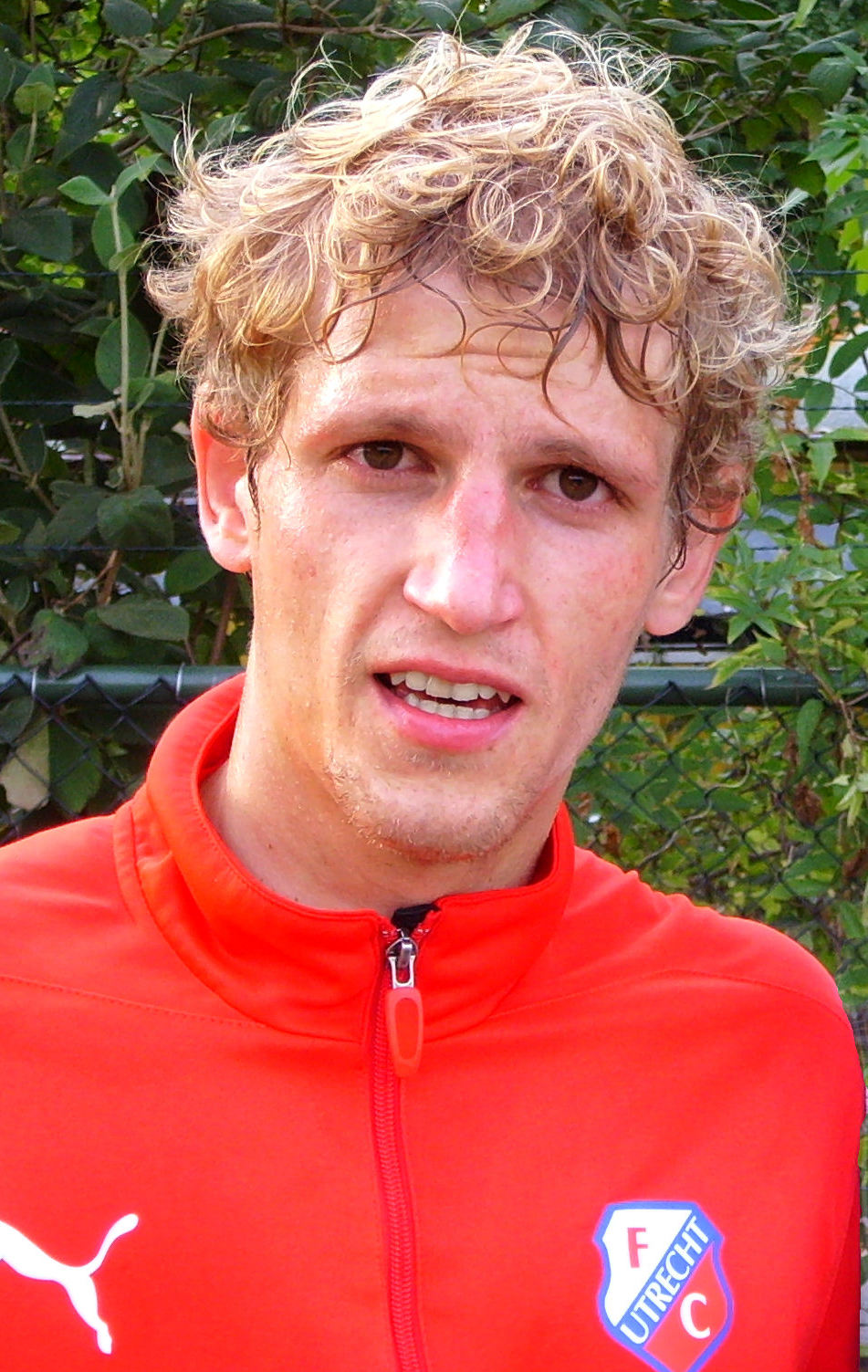
- Neșu with FC Utrecht in 2008
- Born: 19 February 1983 (age 43); Oradea, Romania
- Occupations: Footballer; Philanthropist
- Known for: Founding and managing the Mihai Neșu Foundation
- Height: 1.76 m (5 ft 9 in)
- Spouse: Maria Gherman (m. 2006; sep. 2012)
Association football career
- Position: Left-back
Youth career
- —2001: Bihor Oradea
Senior career*
Years	Team	Apps	(Gls)
2001–2008	Steaua București	86	(1)
2008–2012	Utrecht	81	(2)
Total		167	(3)
International career
2003–2005	Romania U21	12	(0)
2005–2010	Romania	8	(0)
Managerial career
- 2014–2015: Universitatea Cluj (video analyst)
- * Club domestic league appearances and goals
- Website: mihainesufoundation.com/ro

Mihai Mircea Neșu (born 19 February 1983) is a Romanian former professional footballer and philanthropist.

A left-back, Neșu played as a senior for Steaua București and Dutch club FC Utrecht, as well as being capped eight times for the Romania national team. His footballing career ended at age 28, when he suffered a severe neck injury that left him paralysed.

After his accident, Neșu started a personal foundation dedicated to children with motor disorders, at the same time receiving treatment for his paralysis from which he did not make a full recovery.

== Club career ==
=== Steaua București ===
Neșu, who was nicknamed Bișonul (Romanian for "the Bichon"), was born on 19 February 1983 in Oradea, Romania and began playing junior-level football at local club Bihor. He was transferred to Steaua București in 2001 for $6,000 and made his Divizia A debut on 21 April 2002, when head coach Victor Pițurcă used him in a 1–1 draw against Petrolul Ploiești.

During his time in the capital, Neșu aided the club in winning the national title in the 2004–05 and the 2005–06 seasons. He also amassed 33 games in European competitions, of which twelve in the latter campaign as they reached the semi-finals of the UEFA Cup.

=== FC Utrecht and career-ending injury ===
On 27 August 2008, Neșu was sold to FC Utrecht for €1.2 million to replace PSV Eindhoven-bound Erik Pieters. He played 86 Eredivisie matches and scored two goals during his stint, and in 2008 was named the best left-back of the competition.

On 10 May 2011, Neșu got injured during a training session by colliding with teammate Alje Schut; he broke his cervical vertebrae, which left him paralysed in a wheel chair ever since. His FC Utrecht contract expired in July 2012, formally ending his footballing career.

In 2020, he was selected by FC Utrecht fans as the best left-back the team's history.

== International career ==
Neșu appeared eight times for Romania, with manager Victor Pițurcă handing him his full debut on 12 November 2005, when he replaced Răzvan Raț in the 80th minute of a friendly 1–2 loss to Ivory Coast. He also played in a 1–0 away victory against the Faroe Islands in the 2010 World Cup qualifiers. His last game for the national team was a friendly which ended in a 0–2 loss to Israel, on 3 March 2010.

== Personal life ==
Neșu's father, Mircea, was a footballer, referee, and doctor. His nephew, Nikos Barboudis, was also a football player.

On 29 March 2006, Neșu was decorated by the President of Romania, Traian Băsescu, with the Ordinul "Meritul Sportiv" (Order of "Sporting Merit"), Class II, for his contribution to reaching the 2005–06 UEFA Cup quarter-finals with Steaua București.

Neșu married Maria Laura Gherman in June 2006, they divorced after six years.

== Philanthropy ==
In the 2012–13 season, Steaua București honoured Neșu by displaying the logo of his namesake foundation on the club's kit in the UEFA Europa League matches against Ekranas, Ajax and Chelsea.

As of January 2022, Neșu manages the construction of a new and larger rehabilitation centre in Oradea for children with motor disorders.

== Career statistics ==
Appearances and goals by national team and year
National team	Year	Apps	Goals
Romania	2005	2	0
Romania	2006	1	0
Romania	2007	0	0
Romania	2008	2	0
Romania	2009	1	0
Romania	2010	1	0
Total		8	0

== Honours ==
Steaua București

- Divizia A: 2004–05, 2005–06
- Supercupa României: 2001, 2006
