= 2001–02 Eredivisie =

46th season of the Eredivisie

Eredivisie
- Season: 2001–02
- Dates: 17 August 2001 – 5 May 2002
- Champions: Ajax (28th title)
- Promoted: FC Den Bosch
- Relegated: FC Den Bosch; Sparta; Fortuna Sittard
- Champions League: Ajax; PSV; Feyenoord
- UEFA Cup: sc Heerenveen; Vitesse Arnhem; FC Utrecht
- Intertoto Cup: NAC; Willem II
- Goals: 869
- Average goals/game: 2.83
- Top goalscorer: (Netherlands) Pierre van Hooijdonk (24 goals)

The Dutch Eredivisie in the 2001–02 season was contested by 18 teams. Ajax won the championship.

== League standings ==
Pos	Team	Pld	W	D	L	GF	GA	GD	Pts	Qualification or relegation
1	Ajax (Note: Ajax also won the KNVB Cup, thereby taking the double. They would participate in the Champions League, so finalists FC Utrecht could play in the UEFA Cup.) (C)	34	22	7	5	73	34	+39	73	Qualification to Champions League group stage
2	PSV	34	20	8	6	77	32	+45	68	Qualification to Champions League group stage
3	Feyenoord	34	19	7	8	68	29	+39	64	Qualification to Champions League third qualifying round
4	sc Heerenveen	34	17	9	8	57	27	+30	60	Qualification to UEFA Cup first round
5	Vitesse Arnhem	34	16	12	6	45	34	+11	60	Qualification to UEFA Cup first round
6	NAC	34	15	9	10	55	52	+3	54	Qualification to Intertoto Cup third round
7	FC Utrecht	34	14	9	11	60	51	+9	51	Qualification to UEFA Cup first round
8	RKC Waalwijk	34	14	6	14	49	44	+5	48	
9	NEC	34	13	6	15	38	59	−21	45	
10	AZ	34	12	7	15	43	45	−2	43	
11	Willem II	34	10	13	11	54	61	−7	43	Qualification to Intertoto Cup second round
12	FC Twente	34	10	12	12	41	41	0	42	
13	Roda JC	34	11	8	15	33	45	−12	41	
14	De Graafschap	34	10	7	17	43	55	−12	37	
15	FC Groningen	34	10	7	17	40	59	−19	37	
16	FC Den Bosch (R)	34	8	9	17	40	55	−15	33	Qualification to Relegation play-offs (Note: FC Den Bosch and Sparta both relegated after losing their promotion/relegation play-offs.)
17	Sparta (R)	34	4	12	18	26	75	−49	24	Qualification to Relegation play-offs
18	Fortuna Sittard (R)	34	3	8	23	27	71	−44	17	Relegation to Eerste Divisie

Rules for classification: 1) Points; 2) Goal difference; 3) Goals scored; 4) Head-to-head points; 5) Head-to-head goal difference; 6) Head-to-head away goals scored; 7) Play-off if relevant for deciding champion, relegation or participating in a European league, otherwise by draw. 8) Penalty shoot-out (only after a play-off)
(C) Champions; (R) Relegated

== Results ==
Home \ Away	AJA	AZ	DBO	FEY	FSI	GRA	GRO	HEE	NAC	NEC	PSV	RKC	RJC	SPA	TWE	UTR	VIT	WIL
Ajax	—	1–0	2–0	1–1	4–0	4–0	4–3	2–0	1–3	5–0	1–3	3–1	1–1	3–0	3–2	1–0	5–1	4–1
AZ	0–0	—	3–2	1–3	3–0	2–1	3–2	0–2	2–1	5–0	1–1	0–1	1–2	3–0	0–2	1–0	0–0	2–2
Den Bosch	0–1	0–1	—	0–0	4–0	3–1	1–4	0–0	1–2	2–1	0–1	1–0	3–1	1–1	1–3	1–1	4–1	1–2
Feyenoord	1–2	4–1	3–0	—	1–0	2–0	1–0	3–2	0–0	5–0	0–0	1–1	5–0	5–0	1–2	4–0	3–2	3–1
Fortuna Sittard	1–1	0–1	1–3	1–2	—	2–1	0–1	1–0	2–3	2–2	0–1	1–4	0–0	3–4	2–0	3–3	0–0	1–2
De Graafschap	1–1	3–0	0–1	1–0	5–0	—	1–2	1–2	4–2	1–1	2–2	3–1	2–1	3–0	4–2	0–0	0–2	1–1
Groningen	1–4	0–1	2–0	0–1	4–2	2–0	—	1–1	3–0	2–2	2–2	1–1	0–2	0–0	3–0	2–2	0–1	1–0
Heerenveen	5–1	2–1	2–0	1–0	3–1	1–0	2–0	—	5–0	4–0	4–1	2–0	0–0	3–0	0–0	1–2	1–1	3–0
NAC	0–1	3–1	0–0	2–1	3–1	1–0	5–0	2–1	—	1–3	2–0	0–1	2–1	2–2	3–3	1–0	3–3	1–1
NEC	0–2	1–0	2–1	0–3	3–1	3–1	1–0	1–0	1–3	—	0–4	1–0	1–0	1–1	2–0	0–3	1–0	3–0
PSV	1–1	3–0	3–2	2–0	3–0	4–0	8–0	4–1	3–1	3–1	—	2–0	4–1	3–0	1–0	4–0	0–2	6–0
RKC	0–2	3–2	3–3	2–3	1–0	2–0	4–0	2–1	4–1	2–1	2–1	—	3–0	1–1	3–1	1–2	3–2	0–1
Roda	1–1	0–0	4–1	0–2	1–0	0–1	3–1	0–2	1–1	0–0	0–1	1–0	—	3–0	2–1	1–0	0–2	2–0
Sparta Rotterdam	0–4	0–4	1–1	0–5	0–0	1–3	0–0	1–4	2–3	0–0	2–1	0–0	0–3	—	1–1	3–1	0–1	3–2
Twente	0–2	0–0	4–0	3–2	1–1	0–0	0–1	0–0	1–2	2–0	1–1	1–0	3–0	2–0	—	2–0	0–0	0–0
Utrecht	3–1	3–2	3–1	2–2	3–0	6–0	3–1	0–0	0–0	1–4	3–3	2–1	4–1	4–2	1–1	—	3–1	3–1
Vitesse	3–1	1–0	1–1	2–1	1–1	2–1	1–0	0–0	1–0	2–1	0–0	1–1	2–0	1–1	2–0	1–0	—	4–2
Willem II	1–3	2–2	1–1	0–0	3–0	2–2	3–1	2–2	2–2	3–1	3–1	3–1	1–1	4–0	3–3	4–2	1–1	—

Legend: Blue = home team win; Yellow = draw; Red = away team win.

== Promotion/relegation play-offs ==
Group A
Pos	Team	Pld	W	D	L	GF	GA	GD	Pts	Promotion or relegation
1	RBC Roosendaal	6	4	2	0	15	6	+9	14	Promoted to the Eredivisie
2	FC Den Bosch	6	4	1	1	17	9	+8	13	Relegated from the Eredivisie
3	FC Emmen	6	1	1	4	10	15	−5	4	
4	Cambuur Leeuwarden	6	1	0	5	8	20	−12	3	

Group B
Pos	Team	Pld	W	D	L	GF	GA	GD	Pts	Promotion or relegation
1	Excelsior	6	3	1	2	10	8	+2	10	Promoted to the Eredivisie
2	FC Volendam	6	3	0	3	10	14	−4	9	
3	ADO Den Haag	6	2	2	2	13	9	+4	8	
4	Sparta Rotterdam	6	2	1	3	10	12	−2	7	Relegated from the Eredivisie

== Attendances ==
No.	Club	Average	Change	Highest
1	Feyenoord	39,903	6,1%	45,000
2	AFC Ajax	35,584	-2,1%	45,757
3	PSV	31,494	0,6%	33,000
4	SBV Vitesse	24,765	-3,7%	27,500
5	sc Heerenveen	14,295	0,8%	14,500
6	Roda JC	13,900	4,5%	17,000
7	Willem II	13,652	-0,5%	14,700
8	NAC Breda	13,309	4,3%	15,900
9	FC Twente	13,206	0,0%	13,500
10	FC Utrecht	13,076	-3,2%	13,500
11	FC Groningen	12,245	6,1%	13,000
12	De Graafschap	10,891	6,3%	11,500
13	NEC	10,429	3,4%	12,500
14	Sparta Rotterdam	7,529	-2,9%	10,570
15	AZ	7,085	-1,0%	7,970
16	Fortuna Sittard	6,673	-20,3%	12,000
17	RKC Waalwijk	6,303	16,0%	7,300
18	FC Den Bosch	5,191	55,7%	6,155

== See also ==
- 2001–02 Eerste Divisie
- 2001–02 KNVB Cup

== =External links ==
- Eredivisie official website - info on all seasons (in Dutch)
- RSSSF
