= 2003–04 Eredivisie =

48th season of the Eredivisie

Eredivisie
- Season: 2003–04
- Dates: 15 August 2003 – 16 May 2004
- Country: Netherlands
- Champions: Ajax (29th title)
- Promoted: ADO Den Haag; FC Volendam
- Relegated: FC Volendam; FC Zwolle
- Champions League: Ajax; PSV
- UEFA Cup: Feyenoord; SC Heerenveen; AZ; FC Utrecht
- Intertoto Cup: Roda JC; NEC
- Goals: 911
- Average goals/game: 2.97
- Top goalscorer: (Serbia and Montenegro) Mateja Kežman (31 goals)
- Biggest home win: PSV 7–0 FC Volendam
- Biggest away win: Ajax 6-0 FC Volendam

Locations of the 2003–04 Eredivisie teams

The 2003–04 season of the Dutch Eredivisie began in August 2003 and ended in May 2004. The title was won by Ajax.

== League standings ==
| Pos | Team | Pld | W | D | L | GF | GA | GD | Pts | Qualification or relegation |
|---|---|---|---|---|---|---|---|---|---|---|
| 1 | Ajax (C) | 34 | 25 | 5 | 4 | 79 | 31 | +48 | 80 | Qualification to Champions League group stage |
| 2 | PSV | 34 | 23 | 5 | 6 | 92 | 30 | +62 | 74 | Qualification to Champions League third qualifying round |
| 3 | Feyenoord | 34 | 20 | 8 | 6 | 71 | 38 | +33 | 68 | Qualification to UEFA Cup first round |
| 4 | Heerenveen | 34 | 17 | 7 | 10 | 45 | 35 | +10 | 58 | Qualification to UEFA Cup first round |
| 5 | AZ | 34 | 17 | 6 | 11 | 65 | 42 | +23 | 57 | Qualification to UEFA Cup first round |
| 6 | Roda JC | 34 | 14 | 11 | 9 | 60 | 41 | +19 | 53 | Qualification to Intertoto Cup third round |
| 7 | Willem II | 34 | 13 | 10 | 11 | 47 | 54 | −7 | 49 | |
| 8 | FC Twente | 34 | 15 | 3 | 16 | 56 | 53 | +3 | 48 | |
| 9 | NAC Breda | 34 | 12 | 10 | 12 | 58 | 55 | +3 | 46 | |
| 10 | FC Utrecht | 34 | 13 | 7 | 14 | 42 | 52 | −10 | 46 | Qualification to UEFA Cup first round (Note: FC Utrecht qualified for the UEFA Cup by winning the 2003–04 KNVB Cup.) |
| 11 | RKC Waalwijk | 34 | 10 | 10 | 14 | 47 | 55 | −8 | 40 | |
| 12 | RBC Roosendaal | 34 | 10 | 10 | 14 | 34 | 47 | −13 | 40 | |
| 13 | FC Groningen | 34 | 9 | 10 | 15 | 38 | 53 | −15 | 37 | |
| 14 | NEC | 34 | 10 | 4 | 20 | 44 | 62 | −18 | 34 | Qualification to Intertoto Cup second round |
| 15 | ADO Den Haag | 34 | 9 | 7 | 18 | 36 | 61 | −25 | 34 | |
| 16 | Vitesse | 34 | 4 | 16 | 14 | 39 | 56 | −17 | 28 | Qualification to Relegation play-offs (Note: Vitesse remained in the Eredivisie after winning their promotion/relegation play-offs. FC Volendam lost and relegated.) |
| 17 | FC Volendam (R) | 34 | 7 | 6 | 21 | 31 | 79 | −48 | 27 | Qualification to Relegation play-offs |
| 18 | FC Zwolle (R) | 34 | 5 | 11 | 18 | 27 | 67 | −40 | 26 | Relegation to Eerste Divisie |

Rules for classification: 1) Points; 2) Goal difference; 3) Goals scored; 4) Head-to-head points; 5) Head-to-head goal difference; 6) Head-to-head away goals scored; 7) Play-off if relevant for deciding champion, relegation or participating in a European league, otherwise by draw. 8) Penalty shoot-out (only after a play-off)
(C) Champions; (R) Relegated

== Results ==
| Home \ Away | ADO | AJA | AZ | FEY | GRO | HEE | NAC | NEC | PSV | RBC | RKC | RJC | TWE | UTR | VIT | VOL | WIL | ZWO |
|---|---|---|---|---|---|---|---|---|---|---|---|---|---|---|---|---|---|---|
| ADO Den Haag | | 1–4 | 2–3 | 2–2 | 3–1 | 1–0 | 1–1 | 4–1 | 0–4 | 1–2 | 1–3 | 1–0 | 1–0 | 1–1 | 1–1 | 1–1 | 0–1 | 1–1 |
| Ajax | 4–0 | | 3–2 | 2–0 | 2–1 | 3–1 | 2–0 | 1–0 | 2–1 | 1–1 | 4–1 | 4–2 | 1–0 | 1–0 | 5–0 | 5–1 | 6–0 | 1–0 |
| AZ | 0–1 | 1–1 | | 2–2 | 2–1 | 3–1 | 2–2 | 2–0 | 2–4 | 2–1 | 7–0 | 1–5 | 3–0 | 1–2 | 2–1 | 3–0 | 0–0 | 4–0 |
| Feyenoord | 4–1 | 1–1 | 0–3 | | 1–2 | 2–2 | 2–1 | 2–1 | 1–3 | 2–0 | 1–0 | 3–0 | 3–2 | 3–2 | 3–0 | 2–0 | 2–1 | 7–1 |
| FC Groningen | 2–0 | 1–3 | 1–1 | 3–3 | | 0–0 | 1–0 | 2–0 | 0–2 | 2–0 | 1–2 | 2–2 | 1–0 | 1–1 | 2–1 | 0–1 | 1–2 | 2–2 |
| SC Heerenveen | 2–0 | 4–1 | 1–0 | 1–0 | 1–0 | | 3–4 | 1–2 | 3–2 | 1–0 | 1–0 | 2–1 | 3–0 | 4–0 | 0–0 | 2–1 | 1–1 | 1–1 |
| NAC Breda | 1–0 | 4–2 | 1–2 | 0–3 | 1–1 | 2–3 | | 5–2 | 1–3 | 3–2 | 5–3 | 0–0 | 0–1 | 1–2 | 2–0 | 3–2 | 1–1 | 3–1 |
| NEC | 1–2 | 0–0 | 0–2 | 1–2 | 2–3 | 1–2 | 0–3 | | 2–3 | 1–2 | 1–1 | 1–3 | 2–1 | 4–0 | 2–0 | 1–1 | 4–0 | 1–0 |
| PSV | 3–2 | 2–2 | 0–1 | 0–1 | 5–0 | 2–0 | 1–1 | 3–0 | | 1–1 | 3–1 | 1–2 | 1–0 | 2–1 | 3–0 | 7–0 | 6–1 | 5–1 |
| RBC Roosendaal | 0–0 | 0–1 | 1–0 | 1–4 | 1–0 | 1–1 | 1–1 | 1–0 | 0–3 | | 1–3 | 1–4 | 1–2 | 1–1 | 1–1 | 1–1 | 0–0 | 1–1 |
| RKC Waalwijk | 1–0 | 0–1 | 1–1 | 0–0 | 1–1 | 0–0 | 2–0 | 1–2 | 0–4 | 1–2 | | 1–1 | 3–3 | 1–0 | 2–2 | 3–0 | 1–1 | 2–0 |
| Roda JC | 5–1 | 1–2 | 3–1 | 1–1 | 0–0 | 0–1 | 2–2 | 4–0 | 2–2 | 0–2 | 2–1 | | 2–1 | 1–1 | 2–0 | 1–0 | 6–1 | 1–1 |
| FC Twente | 4–0 | 2–0 | 4–1 | 4–2 | 5–3 | 2–0 | 2–1 | 2–5 | 0–2 | 3–1 | 2–1 | 1–2 | | 2–2 | 0–0 | 1–2 | 2–0 | 2–0 |
| FC Utrecht | 5–3 | 1–0 | 0–3 | 0–3 | 2–0 | 2–1 | 1–2 | 0–1 | 0–4 | 0–1 | 1–0 | 3–1 | 2–0 | | 1–3 | 3–0 | 2–2 | 1–0 |
| Vitesse | 1–0 | 1–2 | 1–2 | 0–0 | 1–2 | 0–1 | 2–2 | 2–2 | 0–0 | 1–2 | 3–3 | 1–1 | 3–5 | 3–0 | | 2–2 | 2–2 | 5–2 |
| FC Volendam | 0–2 | 0–2 | 0–6 | 1–3 | 3–0 | 0–1 | 4–2 | 2–3 | 0–5 | 2–1 | 0–4 | 2–1 | 2–0 | 1–2 | 0–0 | | 0–1 | 2–2 |
| Willem II | 1–0 | 2–5 | 1–0 | 0–3 | 2–0 | 2–0 | 1–1 | 3–0 | 3–1 | 3–0 | 4–1 | 0–2 | 2–3 | 0–2 | 1–1 | 6–0 | | 2–1 |
| FC Zwolle | 1–2 | 0–5 | 2–0 | 0–3 | 1–1 | 1–0 | 0–2 | 2–1 | 0–4 | 0–3 | 0–3 | 0–0 | 1–0 | 1–1 | 1–1 | 3–0 | 0–0 | |

Legend: Blue = home team win; Yellow = draw; Red = away team win.

== Promotion/relegation play-offs ==
Group A
| Pos | Team | Pld | W | D | L | GF | GA | GD | Pts | Qualification |
|---|---|---|---|---|---|---|---|---|---|---|
| 1 | Vitesse Arnhem | 6 | 4 | 2 | 0 | 14 | 4 | +10 | 14 | Qualified for 2004–05 Eredivisie |
| 2 | VVV-Venlo | 6 | 2 | 2 | 2 | 11 | 10 | +1 | 8 | |
| 3 | Sparta Rotterdam | 6 | 1 | 3 | 2 | 8 | 10 | −2 | 6 | |
| 4 | Helmond Sport | 6 | 0 | 3 | 3 | 7 | 16 | −9 | 3 | |

Group B
| Pos | Team | Pld | W | D | L | GF | GA | GD | Pts | Qualification or relegation |
|---|---|---|---|---|---|---|---|---|---|---|
| 1 | De Graafschap | 6 | 4 | 1 | 1 | 10 | 4 | +6 | 13 | Qualified for 2004–05 Eredivisie |
| 2 | Heracles Almelo | 6 | 3 | 2 | 1 | 11 | 6 | +5 | 11 | |
| 3 | Excelsior | 6 | 2 | 2 | 2 | 8 | 8 | 0 | 8 | |
| 4 | FC Volendam | 6 | 0 | 1 | 5 | 4 | 15 | −11 | 1 | Relegated to 2004–05 Eerste Divisie |

== Top scorers ==
| Goals | Player | Team |
|---|---|---|
| 31 | (Serbia and Montenegro) Mateja Kežman | PSV |
| 20 | (Netherlands) Dirk Kuyt | Feyenoord |
| 15 | (Netherlands) Gerald Sibon | SC Heerenveen |
| 14 | (Belgium) Thomas Buffel | Feyenoord |
| 14 | (Morocco) Ali El Khattabi | AZ |
| 14 | (Switzerland) Blaise Kufo | FC Twente |
| 13 | (Sweden) Zlatan Ibrahimović | Ajax |
| 13 | (Netherlands) Iwan Redan | RKC Waalwijk; Roda JC |

== Attendances ==
| No. | Club | Average | Change | Highest |
|---|---|---|---|---|
| 1 | AFC Ajax | 49,006 | 3,9% | 51,344 |
| 2 | Feyenoord | 41,726 | -3,2% | 46,300 |
| 3 | PSV | 32,853 | -0,9% | 35,000 |
| 4 | SBV Vitesse | 18,864 | -17,8% | 22,000 |
| 5 | FC Utrecht | 17,356 | 7,9% | 20,200 |
| 6 | sc Heerenveen | 14,593 | 2,3% | 16,180 |
| 7 | Roda JC | 13,069 | -4,6% | 18,112 |
| 8 | FC Twente | 13,059 | -1,3% | 13,250 |
| 9 | Willem II | 12,807 | -4,9% | 14,550 |
| 10 | NAC Breda | 12,654 | -7,9% | 16,000 |
| 11 | NEC | 12,265 | 10,4% | 13,000 |
| 12 | FC Groningen | 12,214 | 2,3% | 16,000 |
| 13 | AZ | 7,737 | 7,1% | 8,800 |
| 14 | ADO Den Haag | 7,215 | 29,5% | 10,000 |
| 15 | PEC Zwolle | 6,250 | 5,1% | 6,800 |
| 16 | RKC Waalwijk | 5,900 | -10,6% | 7,500 |
| 17 | FC Volendam | 5,180 | 145,5% | 6,199 |
| 18 | RBC Roosendaal | 4,981 | 0,3% | 5,000 |

== See also ==
- 2003–04 Eerste Divisie
- 2003–04 KNVB Cup
