= 2003–04 KNVB Cup =

Tournament details
- Country: Netherlands
- Teams: 88

Final positions
- Champions: FC Utrecht
- Runners-up: FC Twente

Tournament statistics
- Top goal scorer: Yuri Rose (6)

The 2003-04 KNVB Cup (at the time called Amstel Cup) was the 86th edition of the Dutch national football annual knockout tournament for the KNVB Cup. 88 teams contested, beginnings on 9 August 2003 and ending AT The final on 23 May 2004.

FC Utrecht beat FC Twente 1–0, lifting the trophy for the third time.

== Teams ==
- All 18 participants of the Eredivisie 2003-04, six of which entering in the round of 16
- All 19 participants of the Eerste Divisie 2003-04
- 48 teams from lower (amateur) leagues
- Two youth teams
- One professional clubs' second (reserve) team

== First round ==
The matches of the first round were played on August 9, 12 and September 1, 2003.

| Home team | Result | Away team |
|---|---|---|
| IJsselmeervogels _{A} | 0–3 | Young Ajax |
| SV Huizen _{A} | 0–3 | HFC Haarlem _{1} |
| VV Baronie _{A} | 7–0 | VV Gemert _{A} |
| ASWH _{A} | 1–2 | FC Eindhoven _{1} |
| FC Omniworld _{A} | 4–2 | AGOVV (amateurs) _{A} |
| VV Be Quick '28 _{A} | 2–5 | BV Veendam _{1} |
| VV Bennekom _{A} | 3–0 | TOP Oss _{1} |
| SV Meerssen _{A} | 0–6 | Willem II _{E} |
| AFC _{A} | 0–2 | De Graafschap _{1} |
| De Treffers _{A} | 2–1 | FC Dordrecht _{1} |
| ACV _{A} | 1–4 | Cambuur Leeuwarden _{1} |
| SC Genemuiden _{A} | 1–0 | Koninklijke UD _{A} |
| VVOG _{A} | 0–7 | FC Twente _{E} |
| HSC '21 _{A} | 1–4 | FC Groningen _{E} |
| Westlandia _{A} | 0–4 | Sparta Rotterdam _{1} |
| VV Ter Leede _{A} | 0–2 | FC Emmen _{1} |
| VV Noordwijk _{A} | 1–7 | FC Zwolle _{E} |
| VSV Tonegido _{A} | 0–8 | RKC Waalwijk _{E} |
| SDC Putten _{A} | 0–4 | sc Heerenveen _{E} |
| sc Heerenveen 2 | 1–3 | AZ _{E} |

| Home team | Result | Away team |
|---|---|---|
| Rijnsburgse Boys _{A} | 0–1 (aet) | Stormvogels Telstar _{1} |
| SHO _{A} | 0–5 | FC Den Bosch _{1} |
| SV Capelle _{A} | 0–1 | HSV Hoek _{A} |
| SV Spakenburg _{A} | 0–2 | FC Volendam _{E} |
| RKSV Babberich _{A} | 0–3 | Roda JC _{E} |
| Schijndel/Bol Accountants _{A} | 1–2 (aet) | ADO Den Haag _{E} |
| SV Deltasport _{A} | (p) 1-1 | Helmond Sport _{1} |
| Quick Boys _{A} | 1–5 | Heracles Almelo _{1} |
| JVC Cuijk _{A} | 1–2 | Fortuna Sittard _{1} |
| UNA _{A} | 0–5 | MVV _{1} |
| OJC Rosmalen _{A} | 1–5 | VVV-Venlo _{1} |
| RKSV UDI '19/Beter Bed _{A} | 0–4 | Vitesse Arnhem _{E} |
| SV Urk _{A} | 0–2 | AGOVV Apeldoorn _{1} |
| USV Elinkwijk _{A} | 1–4 | RBC Roosendaal _{E} |
| Türkiyemspor _{A} | 2–5 | Go Ahead Eagles _{1} |
| VV Harkemase Boys _{A} | 1–2 | WHC _{A} |
| SV Argon _{A} | 1–0 | Achilles 1894 _{A} |
| FC Vinkenslag _{A} | 0–5 | Excelsior _{1} |
| Achilles'29 _{A} | 0–4 | VV Kloetinge _{A} |
| VV Eijsden _{A} | 1–2 | TEC VV _{A} |
| VV Katwijk _{A} | 0–5 | Young sc Heerenveen |

_{E} Eredivisie; _{1} Eerste Divisie; _{A} Amateur teams

== Second round ==
The matches of the second round were played on September 23 and 25, 2003.

| Home team | Result | Away team |
|---|---|---|
| RBC Roosendaal | 4–0 | MVV |
| De Treffers | 2–3 | BV Veendam |
| VV Bennekom | 2–8 | Willem II |
| SV Argon | 3–4 | FC Volendam |
| AGOVV | 0–2 | RKC Waalwijk |
| WHC | 0–1 | FC Groningen |
| TEC VV | 0–3 | Young Ajax |
| VV Baronie | 1–0 | Roda JC |
| HSV Hoek | 7–0 | SC Genemuiden |
| FC Omniworld | 7–3 | SV Deltasport |

| Home team | Result | Away team |
|---|---|---|
| VV Kloetinge | 0–3 | FC Twente |
| HFC Haarlem | 1–2 | Cambuur Leeuwarden |
| Vitesse Arnhem | 4–0 | Fortuna Sittard |
| Excelsior | 2–0 | VVV-Venlo |
| Sparta Rotterdam | 2–1 | De Graafschap |
| sc Heerenveen | 3–1 | AZ |
| FC Emmen | 1–2 | FC Eindhoven |
| FC Den Bosch | 2–1 | FC Zwolle |
| Heracles Almelo | 4–0 | ADO Den Haag |
| Go Ahead Eagles | 3–5 | Stormvogels Telstar |

== Third round ==
The matches of the third round were played on October 28 and 29, 2003.

| Home team | Result | Away team |
|---|---|---|
| VV Baronie | 0–2 | Heracles Almelo |
| sc Heerenveen | 3–1 | Stormvogels Telstar |
| Vitesse Arnhem | 4–0 | FC Volendam |
| RBC Roosendaal | 1–0 (aet) | FC Groningen |
| HSV Hoek | 2–0 | BV Veendam |
| Excelsior | 0–2 | Sparta Rotterdam |
| Cambuur Leeuwarden | 1–3 (aet) | FC Twente |
| FC Omniworld | 2–4 (aet) | RKC Waalwijk |
| FC Eindhoven | 0–2 | Willem II |
| FC Den Bosch | 0–2 | Jong Ajax |

== Round of 16 ==
The matches were played on December 16 and 17. Six Eredivisie clubs entered the tournament here, because they had been playing in the Champions League and the UEFA Cup.

| Home team | Result | Away team |
|---|---|---|
| PSV _{E} | 2–0 | Willem II |
| Sparta Rotterdam | 2–0 | RBC Roosendaal |
| Heracles Almelo | 4–1 | HSV Hoek |
| FC Twente | 1–0 | Young Ajax |
| Ajax _{E} | 0–1 | NAC Breda _{E} |
| Feyenoord _{E} | 1–0 | Vitesse |
| sc Heerenveen | 0–1 | NEC _{E} |
| FC Utrecht _{E} | 2–1 | RKC Waalwijk |

_{E} six Eredivisie entrants

== Quarter-finals ==
The matches of the quarter finals were played on 3-4 February 2004.

| Home team | Result | Away team |
|---|---|---|
| Sparta Rotterdam | 0–0 (p: 3–2) | NEC |
| FC Twente | 3–1 (aet) | Feyenoord |
| FC Utrecht | 3–2 | Heracles Almelo |
| PSV | 0–1 | NAC Breda |

== Semi-finals ==
The matches of the semi-finals were played on March 16 and 17, 2004.

| Home team | Result | Away team |
|---|---|---|
| FC Twente | 2–2 (p: 4-3) | NAC Breda |
| Sparta Rotterdam | 3–3 (p: 3-4) | FC Utrecht |

== Final ==
23 May 2004
18:00 CEST

| Twente | 0–1 | Utrecht |
|---|---|---|
| Heubach (red card) 76' | | Van den Bergh 66' |

De Kuip, Rotterdam
Attendance: 48,000
Referee: Roelof Luinge

FC Utrecht would play in the UEFA Cup.
