= 2007–08 Eredivisie =

52nd season of the Eredivisie

Eredivisie
- Season: 2007–08
- Dates: 17 August 2007 – 20 April 2008
- Champions: PSV (21st title)
- Promoted: De Graafschap; VVV-Venlo
- Relegated: Excelsior; VVV-Venlo
- Champions League: PSV; FC Twente
- UEFA Cup: Feyenoord; Ajax; SC Heerenveen; NEC
- UEFA Intertoto Cup: NAC Breda
- Top goalscorer: Klaas-Jan Huntelaar (33 goals)
- Biggest home win: SC Heerenveen 9–0 Heracles Almelo (7 October 2007)
- Biggest away win: De Graafschap 1–8 Ajax (19 August 2007)
- Highest scoring: SC Heerenveen 9–0 Heracles Almelo (7 October 2007); De Graafschap 1–8 Ajax (19 August 2007)
- Average attendance: 19,090

Locations of the 2007–08 Eredivisie teams
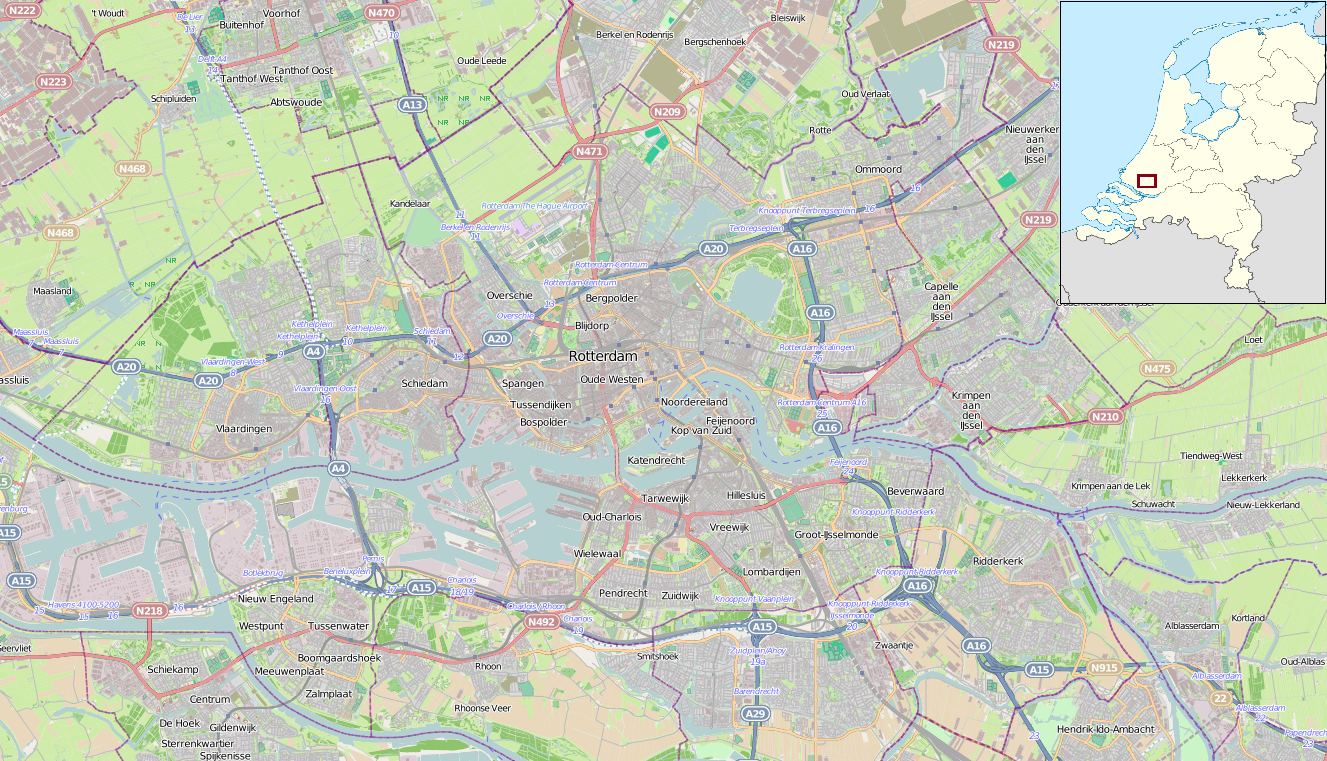
Rotterdam Eredivisie football clubs

The 2007–08 Eredivisie was the 52nd season of the Eredivisie, the top division of association football in the Netherlands. The season began in August 2007 and ended on 18 May 2008, with defending champions PSV retaining their title with 72 points.

== Promoted teams ==
The following teams are promoted to the Eredivisie at the start of the season:

- VVV-Venlo

== League table ==
Pos	Team	Pld	W	D	L	GF	GA	GD	Pts	Qualification or relegation
1	PSV (C)	34	21	9	4	65	24	+41	72	Qualification to Champions League group stage
2	Ajax	34	20	9	5	94	45	+49	69	Qualification to Champions League third qualifying round playoff
3	NAC Breda	34	19	6	9	48	40	+8	63	Qualification to Champions League third qualifying round playoff
4	Twente	34	17	11	6	52	32	+20	62	Qualification to Champions League third qualifying round playoff
5	Heerenveen	34	18	6	10	88	48	+40	60	Qualification to Champions League third qualifying round playoff
6	Feyenoord	34	18	6	10	64	41	+23	60	Qualification to UEFA Cup first round
7	Groningen	34	15	6	13	53	54	−1	51	Qualification to UEFA Cup first round playoff
8	NEC	34	14	7	13	49	50	−1	49	Qualification to UEFA Cup first round playoff
9	Roda JC	34	12	11	11	55	55	0	47	Qualification to UEFA Cup first round playoff
10	Utrecht	34	13	7	14	59	55	+4	46	Qualification to UEFA Cup first round playoff
11	AZ	34	11	10	13	48	53	−5	43	
12	Vitesse Arnhem	34	12	7	15	46	55	−9	43	
13	Sparta Rotterdam	34	9	7	18	52	76	−24	34	
14	Heracles	34	8	8	18	34	64	−30	32	
15	Willem II	34	8	7	19	40	49	−9	31	
16	De Graafschap	34	7	9	18	33	64	−31	30	Qualification to relegation play-offs
17	VVV-Venlo (R)	34	7	8	19	44	76	−32	29	Qualification to relegation play-offs
18	Excelsior (R)	34	7	6	21	32	75	−43	27	Relegation to Eerste Divisie

Source: Eredivisie
Rules for classification: 1) points; 2) goal difference; 3) number of goals scored.
(C) Champions; (R) Relegated

== Match table ==
Home \ Away	AJX	AZ	EXC	FEY	GRA	GRO	HEE	HER	NAC	NEC	PSV	RJC	SPA	TWE	UTR	VIT	VVV	WIL
Ajax		6–1	4–0	3–0	4–1	2–2	4–1	5–1	1–3	0–0	0–2	4–2	6–2	2–2	2–0	4–1	6–1	4–1
AZ	2–3		3–0	0–1	0–0	2–2	0–1	1–0	1–2	4–0	0–2	1–1	1–0	0–0	2–1	2–1	4–0	2–0
Excelsior	2–1	1–1		2–1	1–1	1–3	2–5	1–1	0–3	2–0	1–4	1–2	4–3	0–2	0–2	1–2	2–1	0–0
Feyenoord	2–2	2–2	1–0		2–0	1–1	2–0	6–0	5–0	1–3	0–1	3–0	2–0	3–1	3–1	1–0	4–1	2–0
De Graafschap	1–8	1–2	1–1	1–3		1–1	0–3	0–0	0–1	1–1	0–1	2–1	4–0	0–0	1–1	0–3	3–2	1–2
FC Groningen	1–2 (Note: The match was played on April 16. It had originally been scheduled for April 13, but was suspended and then postponed due to a fire on one of the stands shortly before the match.)	2–1	3–2	3–2	0–2		0–1	1–2	1–2	5–1	2–1	1–1	1–0	1–0	0–2	0–0	1–0	1–0
Heerenveen	2–4	4–0	5–0	1–1	2–3	4–2		9–0	3–0	2–3	2–1	4–3	3–3	1–2	2–3	7–0	5–1	0–0
Heracles Almelo	0–1	2–1	2–0	3–3	2–0	1–2	2–2		0–1	0–2	0–2	0–0	2–0	0–3	2–1	2–2	0–0	1–0
NAC Breda	2–3	2–3	2–0	3–1	1–0	0–3	1–5	4–1		1–3	1–1	0–0	3–0	1–0	1–0	1–2	0–0	1–0
NEC	1–1	5–2	0–1	0–2	3–1	5–1	0–1	3–0	0–1		0–0	1–1	4–2	2–2	2–0	1–0	2–2	1–0
PSV	0–0	1–1	2–1	4–0	4–1	3–0	1–1	2–0	2–0	5–0		2–4	3–1	1–1	4–1	1–0	3–1	3–0
Roda JC	2–1	1–1	3–3	1–3	1–0	5–1	1–0	2–1	0–2	0–2	1–1		2–3	3–1	1–1	3–2	4–1	1–1
Sparta Rotterdam	2–2	2–2	0–1	3–2	6–1	1–3	4–2	1–1	0–1	1–0	1–4	4–1		1–1	2–1	1–2	2–0	2–2
FC Twente	2–1	2–1	1–0	2–0	2–0	3–1	1–0	2–1	1–1	3–0	0–0	0–1	1–2		2–2	4–3	1–1	2–0
FC Utrecht	0–1	2–2	4–1	0–3	2–2	1–0	2–2	3–1	0–1	3–2	3–1	3–1	7–1	0–1		2–4	1–4	2–0
Vitesse Arnhem	2–2	1–0	3–0	0–1	0–2	2–1	0–1	2–0	3–3	1–0	0–1	1–1	3–0	2–2	2–2		1–3	1–0
VVV-Venlo	2–2	2–3	3–1	0–0	3–0	2–5	0–4	0–5	1–3	1–2	1–1	3–5	2–0	0–2	1–2	2–0		1–1
Willem II	2–3	3–0	6–0	3–1	1–2	1–2	2–3	2–1	0–0	3–0	0–1	1–0	2–2	1–3	1–4	4–0	1–2	

Legend: Blue = home team win; Yellow = draw; Red = away team win.

== Top scorers ==
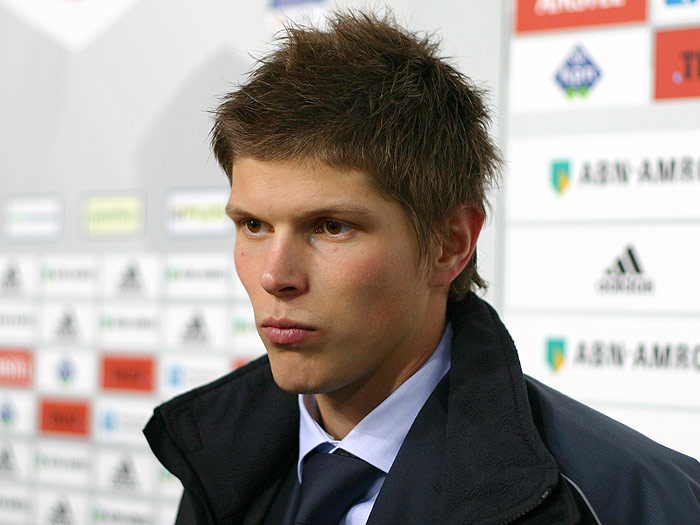
Klaas-Jan Huntelaar, the top scorer of the 2007–08 season.

Goals	Player	Team
33	(Netherlands) Klaas-Jan Huntelaar	Ajax
22	(Switzerland) Blaise Nkufo	FC Twente
17	(Uruguay) Luis Suárez	Ajax
16	(Netherlands Antilles) Robin Nelisse	FC Utrecht
15	(Sweden) Marcus Berg	FC Groningen
15	(United States) Michael Bradley	SC Heerenveen
15	(Denmark) Kenneth Perez	Ajax/PSV
14	(Netherlands) Danny Koevermans	PSV
14	(Serbia) Miralem Sulejmani	SC Heerenveen

Last updated: April 20, 2008
Source: Eredivisie official website

== Play-offs ==
=== For UEFA competitions ===
For one Champions League ticket

Matches A and B
2	SC Heerenveen	1	1	2
5	Ajax	2	3	5
4	FC Twente	3	5	8
3	NAC Breda	0	1	1

Match G
2	Ajax	1	0	1
4	FC Twente	2	0	2

For one UEFA Cup playoff ticket

Matches C and D
10	FC Utrecht	2	1	3
7	FC Groningen	2	3	5
9	Roda JC	0	0	0
8	NEC	1	2	3

Match I
7	FC Groningen	0	1	1
8	NEC	1	3	4

For one UEFA Cup ticket

Matches H and I
5	SC Heerenveen	2	2	4
3	NAC Breda	0	2	2
7	FC Groningen	0	1	1
8	NEC	1	3	4

Match J
3	NAC Breda	0	0	0
8	NEC	6	1	7

The winner of match G, FC Twente, qualifies for 2008–09 UEFA Champions League. The loser of match G, Ajax, qualifies for the 2008–09 UEFA Cup. The losers of matches A and B, SC Heerenveen and NAC Breda, faced each other in match H. The winner, SC Heerenveen, qualified for the UEFA Cup. The loser of match H, NAC Breda, faced NEC, the winner of the playoffs featuring FC Groningen, NEC, Roda JC and FC Utrecht. NEC won that match, match J, and clinched the final UEFA Cup ticket, while the loser, NAC Breda, qualified for the UEFA Intertoto Cup.

Team	Tournament
FC Twente	3rd Qualifying round 2008–09 UEFA Champions League
Ajax	2008–09 UEFA Cup
SC Heerenveen	2008–09 UEFA Cup
NEC	2008–09 UEFA Cup
NAC Breda	UEFA Intertoto Cup 2008

=== Round 1 ===
Team 1	Agg.	Team 2	1st leg	2nd leg
Go Ahead Eagles	1–4	ADO Den Haag	1–1	0–3
TOP Oss	2–5	Helmond Sport	2–2	0–3

=== Round 2 (best of 3) ===
Team 1	Pts	Team 2	1st leg	2nd leg	3rd leg
ADO Den Haag	3–1	VVV-Venlo	1–0	0–1	2–0
MVV	1–6	RKC Waalwijk	1–0	0–2	0–4
FC Zwolle	3–2	FC Den Bosch	0–1	2–1	1–0
Helmond Sport	3–6	De Graafschap	2–3	1–3	Not played

=== Round 3 (best of 3) ===
Team 1	Pts	Team 2	1st leg	2nd leg	3rd leg
ADO Den Haag	5–4	RKC Waalwijk	1–1	2–2	2–1
FC Zwolle	1–3	De Graafschap	1–3	0–0	Not played

The winners of matches G and H will play in the 2008–09 Eredivisie.

== Season statistics ==
Last updated on April 20, 2008.

=== Scoring ===
- First goal of the season: Kemy Agustien for AZ against VVV-Venlo (18 August 2007)
- Widest winning margin: SC Heerenveen 9-0 Heracles Almelo (7 October 2007)
- Most goals in a match: SC Heerenveen 9-0 Heracles Almelo (7 October 2007), De Graafschap 1-8 Ajax (August 19, 2007)
- Fastest goal in a match: Roy Makaay for Feyenoord against Heracles Almelo (2 December 2007)
- Best offensive team: Ajax with 94 goals in 34 matches.
- Worst offensive team: Excelsior with 32 goals in 34 matches.
- Best defensive team: PSV with 24 goals against in 34 matches.
- Worst defensive team: Sparta and VVV-Venlo with 76 goals against in 34 matches.

=== Cards ===
- First yellow card: Gianni Zuiverloon for SC Heerenveen against Willem II (17 August 2007)
- First red card: Patrick Mtiliga for NAC Breda against FC Groningen (18 August 2007)

== Awards ==
=== Annual awards ===
Award	Winner	Club
Dutch Footballer of the Year	(Netherlands) John Heitinga	Ajax
Johan Cruyff Trophy	(Serbia) Miralem Sulejmani	Heerenveen
Eredivisie top scorer	(Netherlands) Klaas-Jan Huntelaar	Ajax

Team of the Season
Goalkeeper	(Brazil) Heurelho Gomes (PSV Eindhoven)			
Defence	(Uruguay) Bruno Silva (Ajax)	(Netherlands) John Heitinga (Ajax)	(Netherlands) Edson Braafheid (FC Twente)	(Netherlands) Tim de Cler (Feyenoord)
Midfield	(Sweden) Rasmus Lindgren (Ajax)	(Morocco) Karim El Ahmadi (FC Twente)	(Netherlands) Ibrahim Afellay (PSV Eindhoven)	(Croatia) Danijel Pranjić (SC Heerenveen)
Forwards	(Netherlands) Klaas-Jan Huntelaar (Ajax)		(Serbia) Miralem Sulejmani (SC Heerenveen)	

== Overview ==
Club	Location	Current manager	Previous managers during 2007–08 season
Ajax	Amsterdam	(Netherlands) Adrie Koster	(Netherlands) Henk ten Cate
AZ	Alkmaar	(Netherlands) Louis van Gaal	
Excelsior	Rotterdam	(Netherlands) Ton Lokhoff	
Feyenoord	Rotterdam	(Netherlands) Bert van Marwijk	
De Graafschap	Doetinchem	(Netherlands) Jan de Jonge	
FC Groningen	Groningen	(Netherlands) Ron Jans	
SC Heerenveen	Heerenveen	(Netherlands) Gertjan Verbeek	
Heracles Almelo	Almelo	(Netherlands) Gert Heerkes	(Netherlands) Hendrie Krüzen, (Netherlands) Ruud Brood
NAC Breda	Breda	(Netherlands) Ernie Brandts	
NEC	Nijmegen	(Netherlands) Mario Been	
PSV	Eindhoven	(Netherlands) Sef Vergoossen	(Netherlands) Jan Wouters, (Netherlands) Ronald Koeman
Roda JC	Kerkrade	(Netherlands) Raymond Atteveld	
Sparta Rotterdam	Rotterdam	(Netherlands) Foeke Booy	(Netherlands) Adri van Tiggelen, (Netherlands) Gert Aandewiel
FC Twente	Enschede	(Netherlands) Fred Rutten	
FC Utrecht	Utrecht	(Netherlands) Willem van Hanegem	
Vitesse	Arnhem	(Netherlands) Aad de Mos	
VVV-Venlo	Venlo	(Netherlands) André Wetzel	
Willem II	Tilburg	(Netherlands) Andries Jonker	(Netherlands) Dennis van Wijk

== Stadiums 2007-08 ==
Team	Stadium	Capacity
Ajax	Amsterdam ArenA	51,628
Feyenoord	Feijenoord Stadion	51,137
PSV	Philips Stadion	35,119
Vitesse	Gelredome	26,600
Heerenveen	Abe Lenstra Stadion	26,000
Utrecht	Stadion Galgenwaard	24,426
Groningen	Euroborg	19,814
Roda JC	Parkstad Limburg Stadion	19,979
AZ	DSB Stadion	17,023
NAC	Rat Verlegh Stadion	17,064
Willem II	Willem II Stadion	14,637
Twente	Arke Stadion	13,740
NEC	Stadion de Goffert	12,470
Sparta	Sparta Stadion Het Kasteel	11,026
De Graafschap	De Vijverberg	12,600
Heracles	Polman Stadion	8,500
VVV-Venlo	De Koel	5,998
Excelsior	Stadion Woudestein	3,527

== Kits 2007-2008 ==
Team	Kit maker	Shirt sponsor	Notes
Ajax	Adidas	ABN Amro	
AZ	Quick	DSB Bank	
Excelsior	Masita	DSW	
Feyenoord	Kappa	Fortis	
De Graafschap	kwd	Centric	
FC Groningen	Umbro	Noord Lease	
SC Heerenveen	Umbro	Univé	
Heracles Almelo	Ben Barton	Koninklijke Ten Cate	
NAC Breda	Umbro	Sunweb	
NEC	Nike	Jiba	
PSV	Nike	Philips	
Roda JC	Umbro	Aevitae	
Sparta Rotterdam	Kelme	Graydon	
FC Twente	Umbro	Arke	
FC Utrecht	Puma	Phanos	
Vitesse	Legea	AFAB	
VVV Venlo	Erima	Seacon Logistics	
Willem II	Masita	Interpolis	

== Attendances ==
No.	Club	Average	Change	Highest
1	AFC Ajax	49,125	1,1%	50,639
2	Feyenoord	44,618	9,1%	47,000
3	PSV	33,512	-0,4%	35,000
4	sc Heerenveen	25,224	-1,0%	26,000
5	FC Utrecht	20,360	1,8%	23,350
6	SBV Vitesse	19,844	-1,7%	25,420
7	FC Groningen	19,336	0,8%	19,721
8	AZ	16,431	2,8%	16,653
9	NAC Breda	15,699	5,5%	16,590
10	Roda JC	14,911	3,6%	18,500
11	FC Twente	13,179	0,1%	13,250
12	Willem II	13,022	4,0%	14,700
13	NEC	12,156	1,2%	12,500
14	De Graafschap	12,129	38,7%	12,600
15	Sparta Rotterdam	10,186	2,4%	10,950
16	Heracles Almelo	8,398	-0,2%	8,500
17	VVV-Venlo	5,938	38,6%	6,500
18	SBV Excelsior	3,108	-3,2%	3,638
