= NAC Fanzine De Rat =

Football fanzine for NAC Breda

NAC Fanzine 'De Rat'
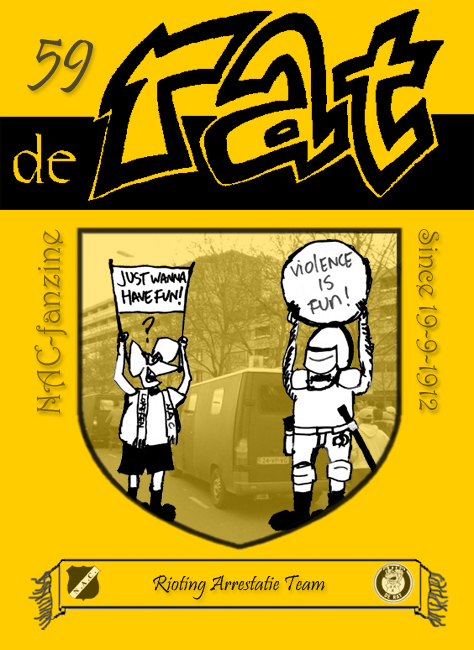
- Logo NAC Fanzine 'De Rat'
- Categories: Fanzine, NAC Breda
- Frequency: 8 times per season
- Circulation: 700
- First issue: 11 August 1996
- Country: Netherlands
- Based in: Breda
- Language: Dutch
- Website: www.derat.nl

NAC Fanzine De Rat, commonly known as De Rat, is an independent fanzine for the Dutch football club NAC Breda. The fanzine was sold for the first time on 11 August 1996 and is the longest established fanzine in the Netherlands. The fanzine is published 8 times during the football season and the fanzine’s circulation in January 2010 was 700 copies. The fanzine is sold before matches of NAC Breda, around the Rat Verlegh Stadion.

The name De Rat is derived from NAC icon Antoon Verlegh, who was nicknamed De Rat because of playing style. He was a player, trainer, editor, secretary, member of the board, vice chairman and chairman of honour at NAC Breda. Verlegh also had several important positions at the KNVB and he was considered to be one of the football icons in the Netherlands until the 1950s. The fanzine was named after Antoon ‘De Rat’ Verlegh, to commemorate Verlegh’s positive impact and to bring NAC Breda’s history to the public.
