= Jacques Visschers =

Dutch footballer (1940–2020)

- Visschers with NAC Breda in 1966

Personal information
- Full name: Jacobus Marinus Petrus Visschers
- Date of birth: 6 December 1940
- Place of birth: Amsterdam, Netherlands
- Date of death: 21 August 2020 (aged 79)
- Place of death: Breda, Netherlands
- Position: Forward

Youth career
- 1948–1959: NAC Breda

Senior career*
Years	Team	Apps	(Gls)
1959–1971	NAC Breda	282	(129)
- * Club domestic league appearances and goals

Jacques Visschers (6 December 1940 – 21 August 2020) was a Dutch footballer who played as a forward. He spent his entire football career at NAC Breda, from 1948 until 1971, when he retired from football.

After his football career, Visschers was a team manager for NAC Breda, and a founder and member of the board of the VVCS. Visschers was also a member of the KNVB’s arbitration committee and NAC Breda's supervisory board.

Visschers was a member of the Order of Orange-Nassau and a member of honour of NAC Breda.

== Club career ==
=== Early years ===
Born in Amsterdam in 1940, Visschers grew up in Breda — his family had temporarily moved to Amsterdam for his father's work. At the age of 7 Visschers wanted to play for NAC Breda but he did not join because he was Catholic, his neighbourhood supported Breda's VV Baronie, and he was too young. When he turned 9 years old, he played his first youth match for NAC Breda. During his younger career he played as an attacking midfielder but, at 18, Cor Kools advised him to become a striker.

=== Senior career ===
On 6 March 1960 Visschers made his debut for NAC Breda in the away match against Sittardia. In 1961 he became a semi professional football player, earning 1500 guilders a year. In 1965 NAC was relegated to the Eerste Divisie, an event which Visschers held himself responsible for, saying “I always say it's my fault. Normally I scored 10 to 15 goals a season. That season I only scored two goals”. At that time Visschers also thought about retirement.

On 6 June 1971 Visschers played his last match for NAC against MVV Maastricht. After 282 matches, in which he scored 129 goals, he retired from professional football.

== Post-playing career ==
After his football career Visschers worked in several roles in the financial sector.

Outside of his work, he was still actively involved in football. From 1967 until 1977 he was a board member of the VVCS. In 1978 Visschers was asked to join the KNVB’s arbitrary commission and later he joined the KNVB's financial commission. He also acated as a team manager for NAC.

From the nineties onwards, Visschers postponed his voluntary activities and supported NAC Breda as a fan. In 2003 Visschers joined NAC's supervisory board, following the club's near bankruptcy. From 2003 onwards, he was responsible for football affairs and scouting.

Despite earlier denials by management and the Board members, it appeared at the end of season 2009–2010 that NAC's financial position was not stable. The club lost €3.2 million that season, due to a stadium rebuild and high player transfer costs. Board members Visschers, Willem van der Hoeven, and Bas Koomans resigned and Bas van Bavel became the new chairman.

Visschers died in Brema on 22 August 2020.

== Honours ==
For his services to Dutch football, Visschers received the KNVB distinction De Nederlandse Leeuw (English: Dutch Lion). NAC's chairman van der Hoeven granted Visschers NAC Breda's Member of Honour title for his services for the club. On 24 August 2008 Visschers was awarded status as a member of the Order of Orange-Nassau for his contributions to Dutch football, especially in Breda.
