= Bob Maaskant =

Dutch football manager (1938–2026)

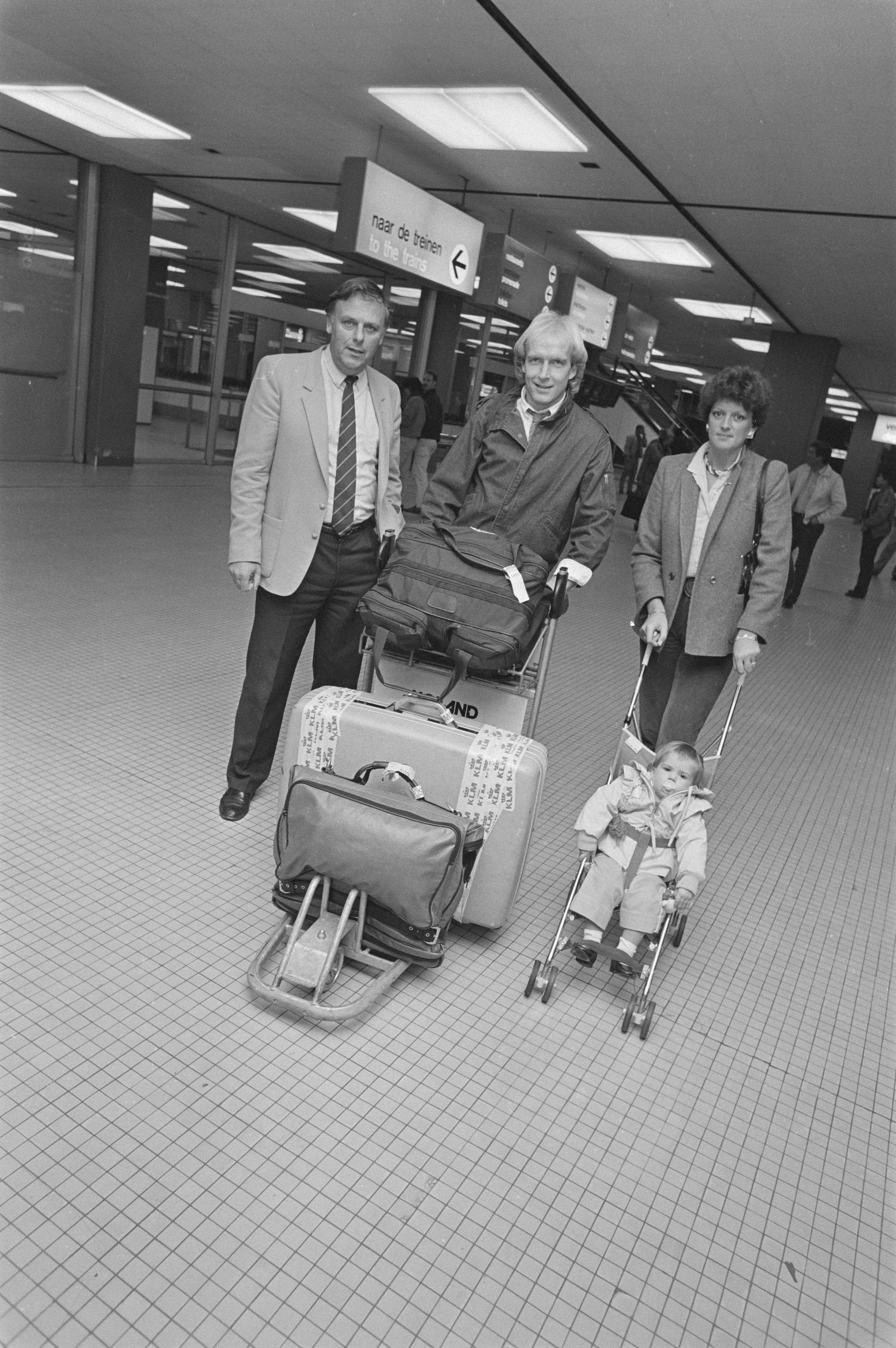
- Maaskant in 1984

Personal information
- Full name: Gerbrand Maaskant
- Date of birth: 15 March 1938
- Place of birth: Rotterdam, Netherlands
- Date of death: 29 June 2026 (aged 88)

Senior career*
Years	Team	Apps	(Gls)
- RV & AV Overmaas
- RVV DHZ

Managerial career
- 1966–1971: NAC Breda (assistant)
- 1970–1971: Holland Sport (assistant)
- 1971–1973: SV Slikkerveer
- 1973–1975: SVV Schiedam
- 1975–1977: NAC Breda
- 1980: Go Ahead Eagles (interim)
- 1981–1983: Go Ahead Eagles
- 1984–1986: NAC Breda
- 1996: Go Ahead Eagles (interim)
- * Club domestic league appearances and goals

Gerbrand "Bob" Maaskant (15 March 1938 – 29 June 2026) was a Dutch football manager.

== Career ==
Born in Rotterdam, Maaskant played football for RV & AV Overmaas and RVV DHZ before moving to the United States. He re-entered football after returning to the Netherlands in 1964, working as a physio for Excelsior, before working as both a physio and assistant manager at NAC Breda two years later. He later worked as an assistant manager at Holland Sport, before becoming the manager of SV Slikkerveer.

After managing SVV Schiedam between 1973 and 1975, he joined NAC Breda, where he was the manager until 1977. While there, he also helped pioneer 'Avondje NAC', a concept which still remains in Dutch football. That same year, he joined Go Ahead Eagles as a technical manager under Wiel Coerver, and acting as interim manager in 1980 until the club hired Antoine Kohn. He was appointed the club's manager when Kohn left the club, remaining until his contract expired in 1983.

In 1984, he came back to NAC, where he coached until stepping down in 1986 due to knee problems. In 1996, he briefly returned Go Ahead Eagles, working as an interim manager for four matches after Ab Fafié was fired.

After stepping down from NAC in 1986, he also worked as a football agent, helping found an agency in the 1990s, alongside Ton van Dalen and Henk van Ginkel.

== Personal life and death ==
Bob's brother Hans worked as a journalist for Dutch newspaper Rotterdams Nieuwsblad. His son, Robert, was also a football manager. Following his retirement from coaching, he regularly attended NAC Breda matches, often alongside former NAC midfielder Addy Brouwers.

Maaskant died on 29 June 2026, at the age of 88.
