= NAC Stadion =

Multi-use stadium in Breda, Netherlands

NAC Stadium
- Beatrix Stadium, NAC stadion Beatrixstraat
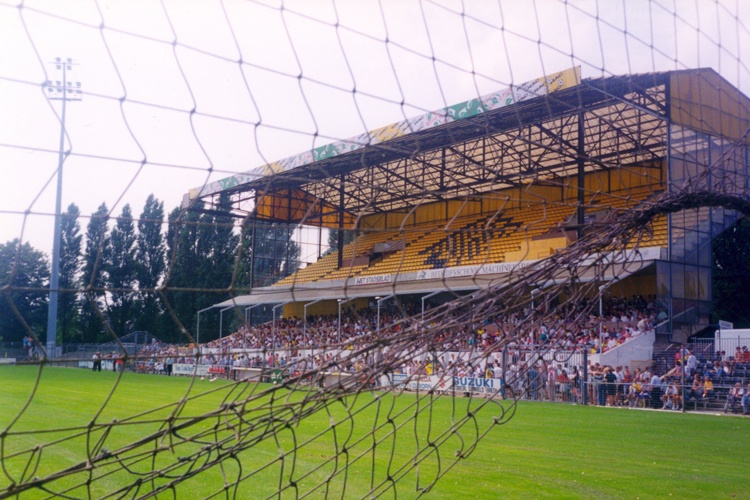
- Interactive map of NAC Stadium
- Location: Beatrixstraat 2; 4811 AC Breda, Netherlands
- Coordinates: 51°34′57″N 4°46′02″E
- Owner: City of Breda
- Operator: NAC Breda
- Capacity: 20,000. Later 10,850 due to safety reasons.
- Executive suites: None
- Surface: Grass
- Record attendance: 20,000

Construction
- Groundbreaking: 1939
- Built: 1939 - 1940
- Opened: October 6, 1940
- Renovated: 1957, 1960, 1969, 1994
- Expanded: 1965
- Closed: May 12, 1996
- Demolished: May 13, 1996

Tenant
- NAC Breda (1940–1996)

NAC Stadion was a multi-use stadium in Breda, Netherlands. It was used mostly for football matches and hosted the home matches of NAC Breda. The stadium was able to hold 20,000 people and opened in 1940. The stadium's capacity was gradually reduced to 10,850 in the nineties, due to security reasons. The stadium was closed in 1996 when the Rat Verlegh Stadion opened.

== Stadium construction ==
In 1939 the city council of Breda enquired whether NAC Breda was interested to move back to Breda, after playing for almost 10 years in the neighbouring village Princenhage due to a conflict with the city council. The city of Breda zoned a large area southwest of Breda's city center as a leisure area, in which a park, a swimming pool and a football stadium would be built. NAC agreed to move back to Breda and in 1939 the construction of the new stadium started. The stadium would have one main pitch with a wooden main stand of 800 seats, terracing surrounding the whole pitch and two training grounds. The stadium would be built at the Beatrixstraat, named after Princess Beatrix. The construction finished in September 1940 and the stadium was inaugurated on 6 October 1940, with the match NAC Breda - FC Eindhoven (0-0). Due to the German invasion and the Dutch capitulation in May 1940 during the 2nd World War, the Germans renamed the Beatrixstraat to Speelveldstraat. When Polish troops liberated Breda in 1944, Speelveldstraat was renamed back to Beatrixstraat.

== Expansions and improvements ==
In the fifties professional football was introduced in The Netherlands. In the first years of professional soccer, NAC played two times the Championship Competition and NAC's popularity grew. The NAC board decided to reconstruct the main stand to a concrete stand and to expand the total number of seats to 1300 seats. The new stand was opened in September 1957. In 1960 NAC expanded the stand behind the goal of the Beatrixstraat and in 1969 NAC reconstructed the entire stand crossing the long side of the field. The stand was completely replaced by a newer and larger grandstand. At this moment the stadium reached its record capacity of 20,000. in 1994 minor renovations were carried out.

== Het Avondje NAC ==
In 1975 NAC Breda purchased a light system, which would enable NAC to play their matches in the evening. The system was introduced on 27 December 1975, when NAC played a friendly against Fortuna Düsseldorf. After that match, the NAC board decided to play the home matches on a Saturday evening. This led to the introduction of the term ‘Een Avondje NAC’ (English; An Evening NAC). In this period a group of fanatic NAC fans merged and located themselves on a stand. Their fierce support lead to an attraction of youngsters, who also fanatically supported NAC. This fierce support lasts till now and is known in The Netherlands as an Avondje NAC. An Avondje NAC is a flamboyant mix of Burgundian fun, beer, fanaticism and love for the club and ensures that during home matches the atmosphere in the stadium is intimidating. Especially in the 1970s and 1990s the Avondje NAC reached national and international publicity. Former FC Barcelona coach Johan Cruijff once compared the atmosphere during the match between FC Barcelona and Real Madrid with the Avondje NAC.

== Renovation or movement ==
In November 1991 NAC Breda's board officially communicated that it researched the possibilities to either renovate the NAC Stadium located at the Beatrixstraat, or to build a new stadium in Breda's city borders. In the announcement it was also stated that the stadium capacity would be limited to 12,000, due to safety reasons.

NAC investigated, together with the city council of Breda, the scenario to expand the main stand across the length of the pitch and to turn the stadium into an all seater stadium. This would lead to a stadium with the capacity of 8,000 seats. Renovation of the current stadium however was too costly and inefficient and the stadium's safety could not be improved. Therefore, in 1993 NAC Breda announced to build a new stadium. In mutual agreement with the City of Breda, the grounds near the Lunetstraat in Breda were allocated as the new stadium zone. The new stadium, now called the Rat Verlegh Stadion has a capacity of 19,000 places. The grounds of the stadium at the Beatrixstraat were allocated as residential zones. NAC's last official match in the Beatrixstraat was on 28 April 1996 against Feyenoord, which NAC lost in front of 10,850 spectators with 0–3. On 12 May 1996 NAC held a friendly match against former NAC players, after which the stadium was demolished on 13 May 1996.
