= Ton Lokhoff =

Dutch football manager and former player (born 1959)

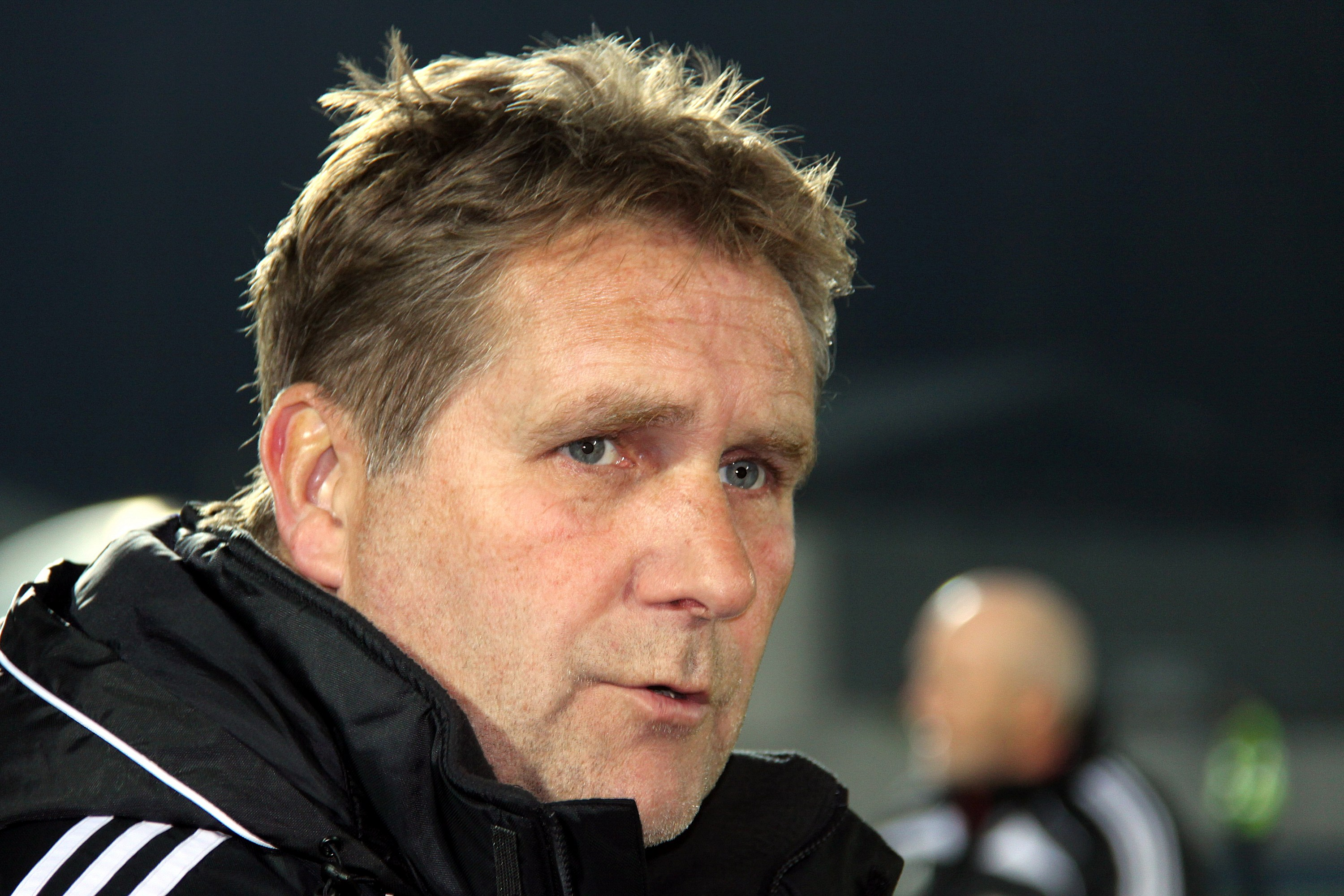
- Lokhoff as assistant of Red Bull Salzburg in 2011

Personal information
- Full name: Antonius Johannes Jacobus Lokhoff
- Date of birth: 25 December 1959 (age 66)
- Place of birth: Breda, Netherlands
- Position: Midfielder

Team information
- Current team: Samsunspor (assistant)

Youth career
- 1976–1978: NAC Breda

Senior career*
Years	Team	Apps	(Gls)
1978–1982	NAC	98	(11)
1982–1986	PSV	126	(19)
1986–1988	Nîmes	63	(12)
1988–1991	Feyenoord	79	(7)
1991–1996	NAC	159	(29)
Total		525	(78)

International career
1984–1985	Netherlands	3	(0)

Managerial career
- 1996–2003: NAC Breda (assistant)
- 2003–2005: NAC Breda
- 2006–2009: Excelsior
- 2009–2011: Red Bull Salzburg (assistant)
- 2012–2013: VVV-Venlo
- 2013–2014: PAOK (assistant)
- 2014: VfB Stuttgart (assistant)
- 2014–2017: VfL Wolfsburg (assistant)
- 2017–2021: VfL Wolfsburg II (assistant)
- 2024–2026: Samsunspor (assistant)
- * Club domestic league appearances and goals

Antonius Johannes Jacobus "Ton" Lokhoff (born 25 December 1959) is a Dutch football manager and former player.

== Playing career ==
Lokhoff is named Mister NAC due to his long-time association with hometown club NAC from Breda, where he played from 1978 to 1982 and later from 1991 to 1996. He moved to PSV in 1982, where he experienced the high point of his playing career. At the club he became Eredivisie champion in 1986, alongside players such as Ruud Gullit, Frank Arnesen and Eric Gerets, among others. In this period he also played two international matches for the Netherlands national team; against Austria and Hungary.

Lokhoff then moved to French club Nîmes Olympique, before returning to the Netherlands to play for Feyenoord and later coming back to finish his career with childhood club NAC in 1991. He played his last match in Breda on 11 August 1996 against Brazilian club Grêmio at the inauguration of the new NAC home ground, Fujifilm Stadion, since named Rat Verlegh Stadion.

== Coaching career ==
Lokhoff started his coaching career again at NAC Breda, first working as an assistant coach to managers Wim Rijsbergen, Herbert Neumann, Ronald Spelbos, Kees Zwamborn and Henk ten Cate, before serving as the club's head coach from 1 July 2003. He was sacked on 30 December 2005 due to disappointing results.

Lokhoff was then appointed the head coach of Excelsior in the summer of 2006, where he succeeded Mario Been who had achieved promotion to the Eredivisie with the club. In 2007, Excelsior managed to maintain themselves in the league under the leadership of Lokhoff, but a year later Excelsior suffered relegation to the second-tier Eerste Divisie. After a season of coaching Excelsior in the second-tier Lokhoff left the club as his contract expired. He was then replaced by Alex Pastoor who managed to lead the club to promotion to Eredivisie. In September 2009 he was named as an assistant trainer for FC Red Bull Salzburg under fellow Dutchman Huub Stevens. After the latter was dismissed from his position on 11 April 2011, Lokhoff left his position the following day, choosing to remain loyal to Stevens.

In December 2011, Lokhoff signed a contract from January 2012 until the end of the season with VVV-Venlo. He succeeded Belgian manager Glen De Boeck who had ended his contract because of a lack of confidence in achieving with the current squad. After the team suffered relegation in June 2013, Lokhoff was sacked. He then joined Huub Stevens again as assistant manager of Greek club PAOK, rekindling their cooperation of Red Bull Salzburg between 2009 and 2011.

On 10 March 2014, Lokhoff joined Stevens as assistant manager of VfB Stuttgart. From March 2014, he began working as an assistant coach at VfL Wolfsburg. First under manager Dieter Hecking, later under Valérien Ismaël. When Andries Jonker became head coach in 2017, Lokhoff moved to the position of assistant of the Wolfsburg second team, VfL Wolfsburg II.
