= Ferry van Vliet =

Dutch footballer

Personal information
- Date of birth: 18 August 1980
- Place of birth: Rotterdam, Netherlands
- Date of death: 25 May 2001 (aged 20)
- Place of death: Moerdijk, Netherlands
- Position: Midfielder

Senior career*
Years	Team	Apps	(Gls)
1999–2001	NAC Breda	40	(6)
- * Club domestic league appearances and goals

Ferry van Vliet (18 August 1980 – 25 May 2001) was a Dutch footballer.

Van Vliet was considered a rising star in the NAC Breda squad. In March 2001 the midfielder signed a 3-year contract with the club after a successful half-year as a starting player. Shortly after, on 25 May 2001, Van Vliet and his girlfriend died in a car crash. They were driving a Smart Fortwo which crashed while driving on the highway. Both van Vliet and his girlfriend died instantly.

Several days after van Vliet's death, NAC Breda played their last match of the season against De Graafschap. De Graafschap allowed the NAC Breda players to turn the match into a memorial for van Vliet. The match ended in a 1-1 draw, which secured another year of top-flight football for de Graafschap. While there were some celebrations after the match, fans also sang to the away end while NAC Breda players fell to their knees sobbing. The respectful response from both De Graafschap and their fans has resulted in a long-lasting friendship between the 2 clubs.
