= Martien Vreijsen =

Dutch footballer (born 1955)

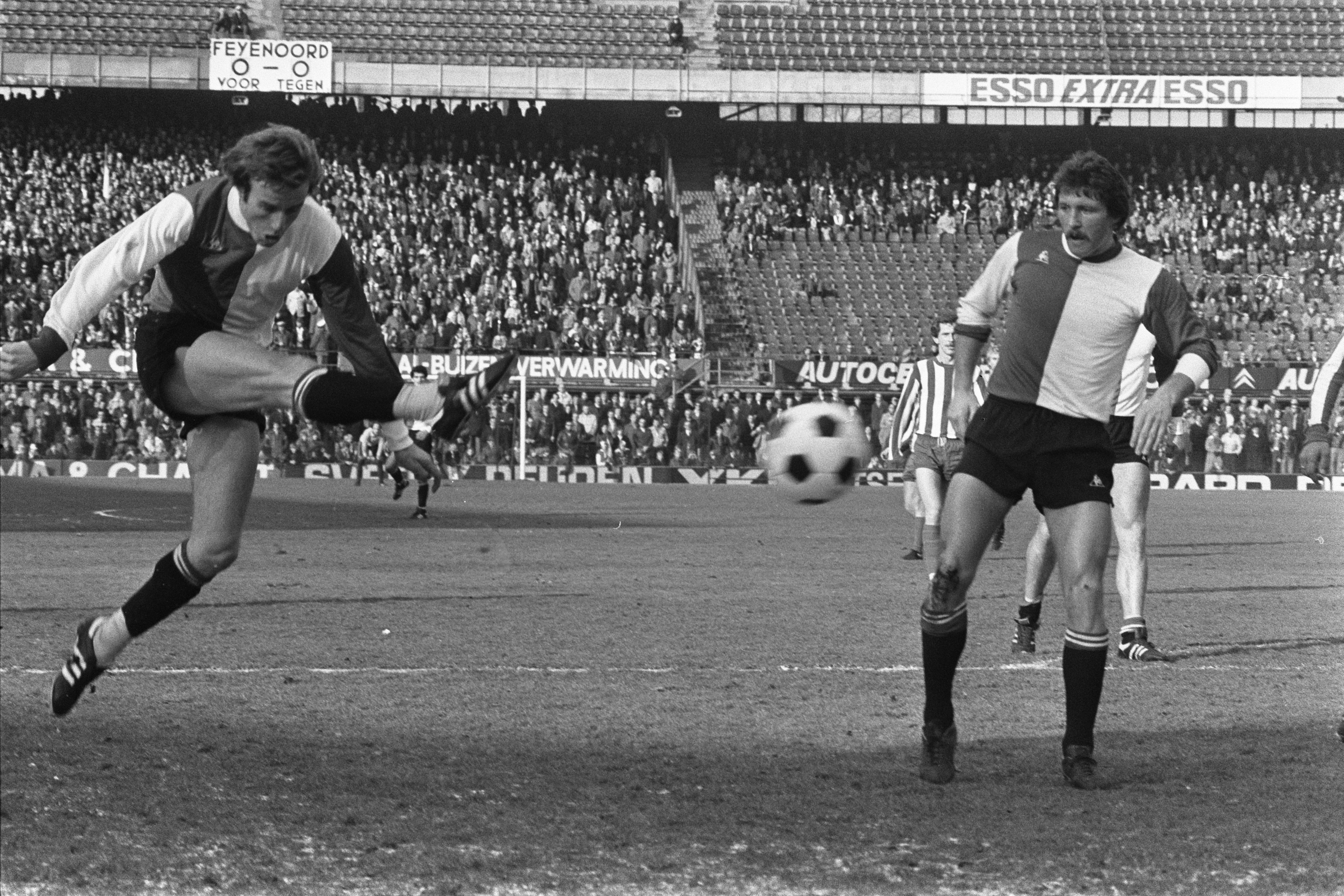

Personal information
- Full name: Nicolaas Martinus Hubertus Johannes Vreijsen
- Date of birth: 15 November 1955 (age 70)
- Place of birth: Breda, Netherlands
- Position: Striker

Senior career*
Years	Team	Apps	(Gls)
1972–1975	NAC Breda	75	(15)
1975–1977	Feyenoord	74	(25)
1977–1981	NAC Breda	131	(36)
1982–1986	Twente	93	(13)
Total		373	(89)

International career
1980	Netherlands	1	(0)
- * Club domestic league appearances and goals

Martien Vreijsen (Dutch pronunciation: [ˈmɑrtiɱ ˈvrɛisə(n)]; born 15 November 1955) is a Dutch former footballer who played as a striker.

He has earned one cap for the Netherlands national football team, while playing for the national team during UEFA Euro 1980, in the match against Greece.
