= Antoon Verlegh =

Dutch footballer (1896–1960)

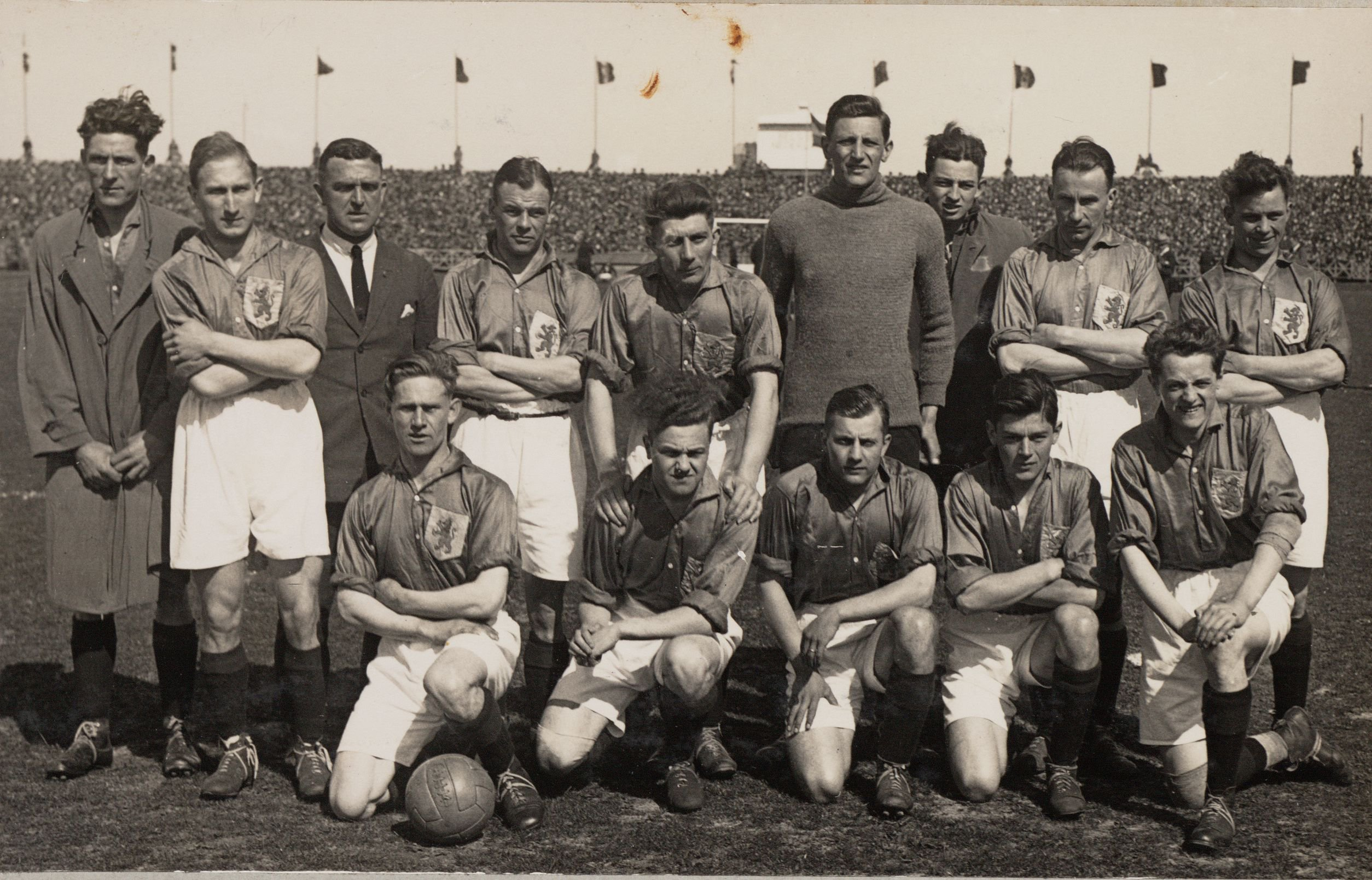

Personal information
- Full name: Antonius Wilhelmus Verlegh
- Date of birth: 29 March 1896
- Place of birth: Ginneken, Netherlands
- Date of death: 12 March 1960 (aged 63)
- Place of death: Prinsenbeek, Netherlands
- Position: Midfielder

Youth career
- 1906–1908: GVV
- 1908–1912: NOAD

Senior career*
Years	Team	Apps	(Gls)
1912–1931	NAC Breda	295	(125)

International career
1920–1927	Netherlands	8	(2)
- * Club domestic league appearances and goals

Antonius Wilhelmus "Antoon" Verlegh (29 March 1896 – 12 March 1960), also known as Rat Verlegh, was a Dutch football player and administrator who is best known for his association with NAC Breda, whose Rat Verlegh Stadion is named in his honour. Verlegh was a player, coach, editor, secretary, member of the board, vice chairman and chairman of honour at NAC Breda. He also had several important positions at the KNVB and he was considered to be one of the football icons in the Netherlands until the 1950s.

== Club career ==
During his entire football career, Verlegh played for NAC Breda. He was involved in this football club from the day it was founded until his death in 1960.

=== Early years ===
Verlegh was born in het Ginneken, now a part of Breda. At the age of 10 Verlegh founded the Ginnekensche Voetbal Vereniging (GVV). At this time Antoon Verlegh was nicknamed 'De Rat' (English: The Rat) because of his quick play and moves. In 1908 Verlegh joined NOAD. In 1912 NOAD and ADVENDO merged to form NAC Breda, for whom Verlegh, at the age of 17, immediately began playing in the first team.

=== Senior career ===
As an attacking midfielder, Verlegh was for 19 years one of the important players in NAC's first squad. Throughout the Netherlands he was considered to be a technically gifted player and an opinion maker in Dutch football. He was also known for his progressive views in football. Verlegh won the Eerste Klasse Zuid's championship (English: Southern Premier League) six times and won the Dutch national title with NAC in 1921. On 26 April 1925, Verlegh sustained a serious injury, that would leave him out for almost seven months. After recovery, he was able to play on until his retirement on 11 October 1931, in the match MVV - NAC (1-3). In the 19 years Verlegh played for NAC, he played 295 matches, scoring 125 times.

== International career ==
In 1920 Verlegh received an invitation for the Dutch national side for the away match against Switzerland in Basel. Although Verlegh didn't start in this match, he made his debut for the Dutch national side. He replaced Willem II player Harry Mommers in the 20th minute. On 25 November 1920, Verlegh played his second international match against Switzerland in Amsterdam's Oude Stadion and scored two goals. In his third match against Germany Verlegh scored an own goal in the 85th minute. The Netherlands lost this match with 2–3. Verlegh played a total of 8 matches for the Dutch national squad, in which he scored 2 times. Although Verlegh would play a 9th match against Denmark, the Dutch national manager deemed him not fit to play. Verlegh was replaced by his NAC colleague Cor Kools. After this replacement, Verlegh never played a match for the Dutch national squad.

== Managerial career ==
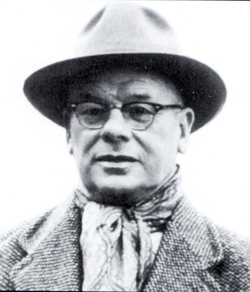
Verlegh

After his active football career, Verlegh fulfilled several roles within NAC. Verlegh was a manager, member of the selection committee (responsible for selecting the best NAC players for a match), he was the secretary, a member of the board and vice chairman. Verlegh was also an editor for the match magazine 'De Klok' and in the thirties he was appointed as a mental coach. For his positive impact on the club, NAC honoured him as chairman of honour at NAC Breda in 1951.

In 1943 Verlegh became a member of the KNVB's committee on youth football. In 1947 Verlegh was appointed as a member for the technical committee and the selection committee. The last committee's purpose was to select the best Dutch players for the national team, in which Verlegh was appointed as chairman in 1950. After a conflict, Verlegh resigned from all his activities for the KNVB in 1953.

== Death ==
On 12 March 1960, Verlegh visited friends in The Hague. Not feeling well, Verlegh decided to leave by car for Breda. On 13 March, NAC played a home match against SC Enschede, which Verlegh didn't attend. After it appeared Verlegh hadn't reach home, he was reported missing. On 14 March Verlegh's car and body were found in a small lake near Prinsenbeek. Doctors assumed Verlegh died of a heart attack while driving. On 17 March, Verlegh was buried, with huge interest by the Breda community, the NAC family and the KNVB officials. Later, the KNVB board wrote in a letter to NAC Breda: ...He was an example to all of us. He had a vast knowledge of Dutch football. The KNVB cannot recall any Dutchman which equals him in his football knowledge. Rat was in every way a great man....

== Post death ==
Two years after Antoon Verlegh's death, NAC celebrated its 50th anniversary in 1962. During this anniversary, NAC Breda announced it would name its training pitches as 'Rat Verlegh fields' and that NAC would organize the Rat Verlegh Tournament each year, in which Dutch and Belgian top club's youth teams would play in. Although Antoon Verlegh had a huge impact to the club, his name seems to be forgotten by the majority of people during the seventies and the eighties.

In 1996 the new NAC stadium was opened. The fanatic NAC fans immediately began naming the stadium the Rat Verlegh Stadion. In gratitude for the work and the impact Antoon Verlegh had for NAC Breda, the fanatic NAC fans also dedicated a fanzine to him; NAC Fanzine De Rat De Rat opened an internet site in December 1996 as NAC Fanzine De Rat ONLINE, in which NAC's history, the magazines and information about Antoon Verlegh were published. This fanzine is still being published and is the oldest football fanzine in The Netherlands, with a circulation of 1000 copies. Because of the fanzine's popularity, most of the NAC fans began to name the new stadium the Rat Verlegh Stadion.

In 2004 Antoon Verlegh was named one of the most important persons in Dutch football history. As a remembrance of Antoon Verlegh's positive impact on NAC Breda, the club named the stadium as Rat Verlegh Stadion in 2006.
