= 1972–73 KNVB Cup =

Tournament details
- Country: Netherlands
- Teams: 46

Final positions
- Champions: NAC
- Runners-up: NEC

The 1972-73 KNVB Cup was the 55th edition of the Dutch national football annual knockout tournament for the KNVB Cup. 46 teams contested, beginning on 29 October 1972 and ending at the final on 31 May 1973.

Ajax unsuccessfully defended its 1972 title losing on 10 December 1972 in the Second round, when the 18 Eredivisie teams entered this round, NAC, 2–2 (penalty shootout).

NAC successfully pursued its first KNVB Cup defeating NEC, 2–0. NAC contested in the Cup Winners' Cup.

== Teams ==
- All 18 participants of the Eredivisie 1972-73, entering in the second round
- All 20 participants of the Eerste Divisie 1972-73
- 8 teams from lower (amateur) leagues

== First round ==
29 October 1972
Caesar Beek _{A}	1–2	Helmond Sport _{1}
Ede _{A}	1–4 (aet)	Willem II _{1}
USV Elinkwijk _{A}	3–0	FC Eindhoven _{1}
FC VVV _{1}	2–0	FC Wageningen _{1}
Fortuna Sittard _{1}	2–2 (p: 5–6)	PEC Zwolle _{1}
HVC _{1}	0–2	De Volewijckers _{1}
IJsselmeervogels _{A}	0–4	Roda JC _{1}
VV Leeuwarden _{A}	0–3	Heracles _{1}
RKSV Sparta'25 _{A}	0–0 (p: 6–5)	FC Dordrecht _{1}
SVV _{1}	2–0	SC Cambuur _{1}
Veendam _{1}	2–0	Fortuna Vlaardingen _{1}
Vitesse Arnhem _{1}	2–1 (aet)	De Graafschap _{1}
Xerxes Rotterdam _{A}	0–1	sc Heerenveen _{1}
Zwart-Wit '28 _{A}	0–3	FC Volendam _{1}

_{1} Eerste Divisie; _{A} Amateur teams

== Second round ==
The 18 Eredivisie teams entered this round.

December 10, 1972
AZ'67 _{E}	2–0	FC Den Bosch _{E}
USV Elinkwijk	2–0	FC VVV
Excelsior _{E}	2–1	FC Utrecht _{E}
FC Amsterdam _{E}	3–1 (aet)	Helmond Sport
FC Den Haag _{E}	6–0	Sparta'25
HFC Haarlem _{E}	0–3	Feyenoord _{E}
Heracles	2–1	sc Heerenveen
NAC _{E}	2–2 (p)	Ajax _{E}
NEC _{E}	1–0	Go Ahead Eagles _{E}
Sparta _{E}	3–1	MVV _{E}
SVV	0–0 (p)	Roda JC
Telstar _{E}	0–2	FC Twente _{E}
Veendam	1–0	FC Groningen _{E}
FC Volendam	0–1	PEC Zwolle
De Volewijckers	1–0	Vitesse Arnhem
Willem II	0–3	PSV _{E}

_{E} Eredivisie

== Third round ==
January 28, 1973
USV Elinkwijk	0–4	NAC
Excelsior	1–3	PSV
FC Den Haag	2–1	De Volewijckers
FC Twente	4–0	Heracles
NEC	2–0	SVV
PEC Zwolle	1–3	Feyenoord
Sparta	1–0	FC Amsterdam
Veendam	2–3 (aet)	AZ'67

== From quarterfinals to final ==
Quarter-finals
14 March
PSV	0
Sparta	1
14 March
FC Den Haag	1
NAC	2
14 March
NEC	1
Feyenoord	0
14 March
AZ'67	1
FC Twente	0

Semi-finals
4 April
Sparta	1
NAC	2
4 April
NEC	1
AZ'67	0

Final
31 May
NAC	2
NEC	0

=== Details of the final ===
31 May 1973

NAC	2–0	NEC
Bish 10'; Brouwers 75'

De Kuip, Rotterdam
Attendance: 45,801
Referee: Theo Boosten

NAC would participate in the Cup Winners' Cup.
