= Gert Aandewiel =

Dutch footballer and manager

Personal information
- Full name: Gert Aandewiel
- Date of birth: 9 September 1969 (age 57)
- Place of birth: Katwijk, Netherlands
- Position: Midfielder

Senior career*
Years	Team	Apps	(Gls)
- Quick Boys
1996–1997	Volendam	25	(2)
1997–1998	Sparta	13	(0)
1998–1999	Dordrecht'90	19	(2)
1999	Sparta	4	(0)
Total		61	(4)

Managerial career
- 2002–2005: Quick Boys
- 2005–2007: Haarlem
- 2007: Sparta
- 2008–2012: NAC (assistant)
- 2012–2013: Banants (youth dev mngr)
- 2013–2014: FC Oss
- 2018: Quick Boys
- * Club domestic league appearances and goals

Gert Aandewiel (born 9 September 1969 in Katwijk) is a Dutch football manager and former player.

== Club career ==
Born in Katwijk, Aandewiel played professional football for FC Volendam (1996–1997), Sparta Rotterdam (1997–1999) and FC Dordrecht (1999).

== Managerial career ==
After winning two amateur championships and the Amateur Coach of the Year trophy with Quick Boys, Aandewiel became manager of Haarlem in 2005. On 8 February 2007, when working as a coach for HFC Haarlem, he was named as the new manager of Sparta Rotterdam to replace Wiljan Vloet at the end of the 2006–2007 season. He was sacked by Sparta Rotterdam on 11 November 2007. He joined NAC and became joint caretaker-manager, then assistant to John Karelse.

In April 2012 Aandewiel announced he would become Armenia's FC Banants' youth development manager. In March 2014, Aandewiel revealed he would leave FC Oss in the summer after only a half year at the helm. In October 2014, Aandewiel was named technical manager of Dutch Hoofdklasse side Quick Boys. He was appointed manager of the club again at the end of 2017.
