= John Karelse =

Dutch footballer and manager

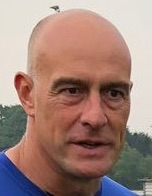
- Karelse in 2018

Personal information
- Date of birth: 17 May 1970 (age 56)
- Place of birth: Wemeldinge, Netherlands
- Height: 1.91 m (6 ft 3 in)
- Position: Goalkeeper

Youth career
- VV Wemeldinge
- AGOVV Apeldoorn

Senior career*
Years	Team	Apps	(Gls)
1986–1999	NAC Breda	382	(0)
1999–2003	Newcastle United	3	(0)
2003–2004	AGOVV Apeldoorn	36	(0)
Total		421	(0)

International career
1987	Netherlands U19	2	(0)

Managerial career
- 2006: NAC Breda (caretaker)
- 2006–2011: NAC Breda (assistant manager)
- 2011–2012: NAC Breda
- * Club domestic league appearances and goals

John Karelse (born 17 May 1970) is a Dutch football manager and former player. A goalkeeper, he spent most of his career with NAC Breda.

== Career ==
Karelse was born in Wemeldinge. He played for AGOVV Apeldoorn in his native country for a few years before moving to NAC Breda. It was here that he caught the attention of then Newcastle United manager Ruud Gullit, who signed him for an undisclosed fee (thought to be in the region of £800,000) in August 1999. His time at Newcastle was largely unsuccessful, as he endured a terrible start to his career at the club, losing 4–2 to Southampton on his debut. He found his first team opportunities very limited after this, not helped by the competition for his position being very high with the reliable Shay Given and Steve Harper also at the club. Tony Caig was also ahead of him as third choice backup. He did, however, manage to keep a clean sheet against Arsenal at Highbury, in what proved to be his third and final game for the club.

A proposed move to Turkey broke down in 2000, but a year later a move back to the Netherlands seemed likely, with Feyenoord rumoured to be interested. No move materialised and the former Dutch Under-21 international had no choice but to stay in the Newcastle reserves. He retired in 2004 after one final season at AGOVV Apeldoorn.

In 2006, he became interim manager of NAC and led the team successfully through the relegation play-offs. Karelse became manager of NAC in 2011.
