= NAC Breda =

Dutch football club

- Full name: Nooit opgeven altijd doorzetten, Aangenaam door vermaak en nuttig door ontspanning, Combinatie Breda
- Nicknames: Parel van het Zuiden (Pearl of the South); The Yellow Army
- Short name: NAC
- Founded: 19 September 1912; 114 years ago
- Stadium: Rat Verlegh Stadion
- Capacity: 20,500
- Owner: NAC=Breda
- Chairman: Henk van Koeveringe
- Head coach: Rick Kruys
- League: Eerste Divisie
- 2025–26: Eredivisie, 17th of 18 (relegated)
- Website: www.nac.nl
Home colours	Away colours	Third colours

NAC Breda (Dutch pronunciation: [nɑɡ breːˈdaː]), often simply known as NAC, is a Dutch professional football club, based in Breda, Netherlands. NAC Breda play in the Rat Verlegh Stadium, named after their most important player, Antoon 'Rat' Verlegh. The club competes in the Eerste Divisie, the second tier of Dutch football, following relegation from the Eredivisie in the 2025–26 season. In their history, NAC won one national title in 1921 and won one KNVB Cup in 1973.

NAC was founded on 19 September 1912, when the two clubs ADVENDO and NOAD merged to one club, both being abbreviations of their respective full names.

In August 2012, NAC reinstated their first crest as the new club logo for the 2012–13 season.

== Name and etymology ==
NAC is a fusion of the two abbreviations of the two clubs that merged to create it in 1912, NOAD and ADVENDO.

NOAD is a Dutch abbreviation for Nooit Opgeven, Altijd Doorzetten (English translation: Never give up, always persevere), while ADVENDO is a Dutch abbreviation for Aangenaam Door Vermaak En Nuttig Door Ontspanning (English: Pleasant for its entertainment and useful for its relaxation). The C stands for Combinatie (combination).

The full name of NAC Breda expands to Nooit opgeven altijd doorzetten, Aangenaam door vermaak en nuttig door ontspanning, Combinatie Breda ([ˌnoːit ˈɔpxeːvə(n) ˌɑltɛiˈdoːrɣaːn ˈaːŋɣəˌnaːm doːr vərˈmaːk ɛˈnʏtəɣ doːr ɔntˈspɑnɪŋ kɔmbiˈnaː(t)si breːˈdaː]).

Early in 2003 NAC added Breda to their club name as a symbol of gratitude after the City of Breda bought NAC's Rat Verleghstadium to help the club cope with financial problems.

== History ==
=== Foundation ===
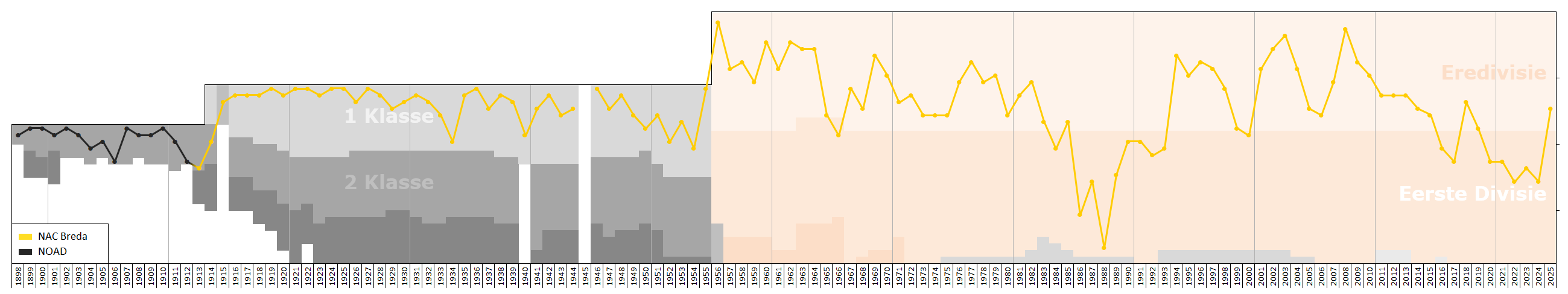
Historical chart of league performance

NAC Breda was founded on 19 September 1912 when the clubs ADVENDO and NOAD merged. During the new club's foundation meeting the atmosphere became tense, since NOAD wanted to name the new club NOAD (NOad and ADvendo). This name was not acceptable to ADVENDO and eventually Frans Konert proposed to call the club NAC (NOAD ADVENDO Combinatie), which was accepted by the meeting's attendants. At first, the NVB refused to let NAC play association football, but on 28 October 1912 allowed NAC to play in the 2nd Southern Division.

=== NAC's golden ages ===
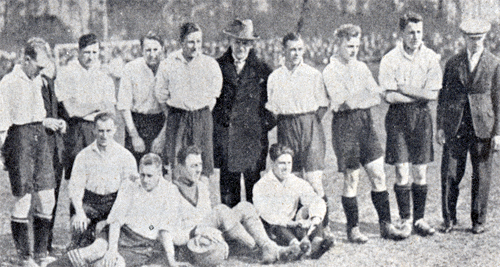
NAC's first squad in 1926

The first years were not very successful for NAC, but after moving to a new stadium 't Ploegske, results improved. NAC became one of the top teams in the top Southern Division, becoming champions of the 1919 season, earning NAC the right to play the Dutch Champions' Competition (a small competition in which the champions from the regional divisions would play for the Dutch title). In this competition, NAC finished in last place. In 1920, NAC were one of the first clubs to play international matches. NAC played a couple of friendly matches, including a match against Real Madrid CF, winning 4-0 and the Spanish newspapers called NAC 'Los muchachos del Breda, maestros del futbol' (English: The boys from Breda, masters in football). In 1921, NAC celebrated one of its greatest achievements, becoming Dutch football champions. In the Dutch Championship competition, NAC defeated Ajax, Be Quick 1887 and Go Ahead. NAC continued to excel, being considered to be one of the best clubs in Dutch football during the 20's and 30's. During this period they won 6 Southern Division titles and their play style was deemed technically perfect by press and the public.

Because of this view, the NAC board decided to hire a professional trainer. Englishman Ben Affleck was hired as a coach and a couple of months later was succeeded by James Moore. After Moore resigned, the NAC board issued a committee, who would select the best 11 NAC players to play in a match. In 1931 Antoon Verlegh retired from football. Verlegh, nowadays a club icon for NAC, played for them since their foundation. In this year, NAC also had a dispute with the city of Breda. The stadium's terrain 't Ploegske was classed as a residential area, meaning NAC had to leave the ground. As no other option was available in Breda, NAC were forced to move to the town Princenhage. Within two months, a complete new stadium, with a capacity of 5,500 people, was built and NAC left Breda. In 1935, NAC became the first club in the Netherlands to travel via airplane to an away match against GVAV.

In 1939, NAC and Breda reopened discussions on whether they could return to the city. Breda's council zoned a large piece of land at the Beatrixstraat as stadium area and NAC returned to Breda in 1940. Because of the breakout of the Second World War, NAC decided to play an important social function in Breda's community. In order to divert the people's attention from war, NAC organized sport events, theatre, fairs and horsing games. Although NAC continued to play football, several players were employed by the Germans in Germany. During the Second World War, youngster Kees Rijvers made his debut for NAC.

=== Challenging times ===
After the Second World War, NAC played in the highest level. In 1949 Chairman of Honour C.J. Asselbergs died. Asselbergs was one of the people who were present at NAC since NAC got founded. In 1954 professional football was introduced in the Netherlands. The running competitions were postponed and new competitions were created. NAC entered the 1A League and became champions of this league in 1955. In the championship competition NAC finished second place, behind their rivals Willem II Tilburg.

On 14 March 1960 Breda was shocked to hear the death of Antoon 'De Rat' Verlegh. Verlegh, considered to be one of the important persons in Dutch football, died in a car accident on 12 March. From NAC's foundation in 1912, Verlegh was involved in the club at numerous positions and played an important role with the Royal Dutch Football Association. In November 1961 NAC lost another important person; Chairman Jacques Piederiet died. A year later, in August 1962, chairman Le Fevre died. The beginning of the sixties were not bright for NAC. In 1964–1965 NAC were relegated for the first time in their existence.

The relegation meant a total reconstruction of the club's management. The board resigned and NAC's intention was to return to the highest level within one year. NAC was successful in this and a season later NAC played in the highest level and a year later qualified for the KNVB Cup's final, where it lost to AFC Ajax. Although NAC lost, the club was allowed to play UEFA Cup. In the UEFA Cup NAC reached the second round, after defeating Floriana FC. In the second round NAC was knocked out by Cardiff City. Although NAC remained in the highest football level in the Netherlands, NAC were in a heavy struggle not to relegate. 31 May 1973 is another highlight in NAC's history. In the KNVB Cup final, NAC played NEC Nijmegen. NAC won the Final 2-0. Because of their success, NAC was allowed to play in the UEFA Cup Winners' Cup. In the first round, NAC was knocked out by eventual winners 1. FC Magdeburg.

=== The birth of the Avondje NAC ===
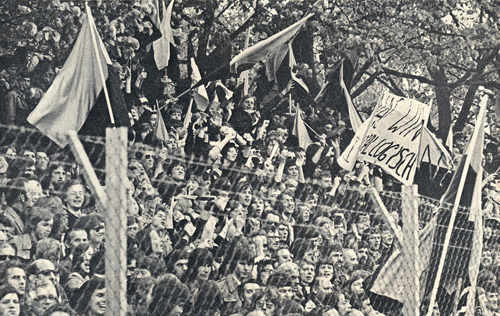
NAC's fans in 1975 on the Spionkop

In 1975 the NAC board decided to play the home matches on a Saturday evening. In this period a group of fanatic NAC fans merged and located themselves on a stand. Their fierce support lead to an attraction of youngsters, who also fanatically support NAC. This fierce support lasts till now and is known in the Netherlands as an Avondje NAC (English; An Evening NAC). An Avondje NAC is a flamboyant mix of Burgundian fun, beer, fanaticism and love for the club and ensures that during home matches the atmosphere in the stadium is intimidating. On 6 October 1979, a strange situation occurred. During the home match against NAC's rivals Feyenoord the linesman was hit by an ashtray. The referee postponed the match, riots broke out and the incident in the Netherlands is known as the 'Ashtray Incident'.

In the eighties NAC relegated two times. After the second relegation, it appeared the financial situation of NAC was terrible. NAC was almost bankrupt and had to sell its belongings to survive. For years NAC struggled to survive, but at the end of the eighties NAC's situation improved and the club began to play in the top of the Eerste Divisie. On 7 June 1989, NAC player Andro Knel died in a plane accident. It was a shock to the club, especially since Knel was one of the popular players. Hundreds of fans of both NAC Breda and Sparta Rotterdam, Knel's former club, came together in memorial of Knel. A temporary Knel monument was revealed and the numbers of supporters visiting the monument proved his popularity. Due to the sad moments of Knel's death a special relationship between fans of NAC and Sparta was created.

After Knel's death, NAC had to continue to play in de Eerste Divisie and three times NAC was close to promote back to the Eredivisie. In 1993, NAC finally promoted to the Eredivisie. With a team managed by Ronald Spelbos and players like John Lammers, Pierre van Hooijdonk, Ton Lokhoff, Fabian Wilnis and John Karelse, NAC played their promotion match in Den Bosch against FC Den Bosch in front of 9,000 NAC fans. The promotion meant a revival of NAC's popularity, the stadium was sold out and NAC was supported by thousands of people in away matches. In the away match against their rivals Feyenoord in Rotterdam, NAC was supported by 8,000 people. Due to the popularity, the NAC board announced it would leave the stadium at the Beatrixstraat and it would build a new stadium. Until the movement, NAC continued to play in the highest level, missed qualification for the UEFA Cup several times and reached the semi-finals of the KNVB Cup.

=== A new stadium and continuing financial problems ===
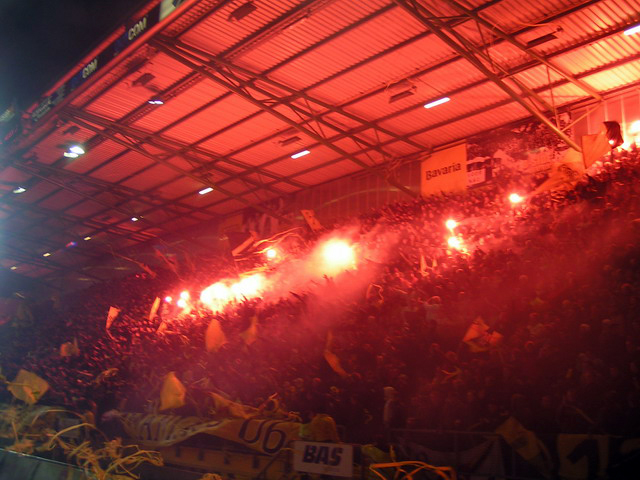
NAC's fans on the B-Side before the start of the match between NAC and PSV in 2007

In 1996 NAC moved to their new stadium, the FUJIFILM Stadium. With the move NAC indicated it wanted to play in Europe on a regular basis. In 1998, club youngster Dominique Diroux died from a heart attack during a match between the reserve teams of NAC and AZ. NAC's new players couldn't meet the club's raised expectations for a couple of seasons; NAC were even relegated in 1999. After this, it appeared that NAC's financial situation was again in peril. In 4 seasons, NAC bought 60 players and the costs of the new stadium exceeded their budget. In order to save the club, the stadium was bought from NAC by investors and Roelant Oltmans was appointed as the team's first professional manager. Also, a fans' council, the first in Holland, was established, where fans have an advisory role that protects NAC's culture and defend fan interests. NAC also has a position available to a fan in the board of chairmen.

NAC professionalized and were promoted in 2000 to the Eredivisie. In 2003, NAC qualified for the UEFA Cup, playing two matches against Newcastle United. An estimated 4,300 NAC fans travelled to Newcastle to support their team. In 2003 it appeared NAC again neared bankruptcy, but the City of Breda purchased the stadium again from NAC on 30 January 2003. As gratitude, NAC modified their name to become NAC Breda, honouring the city's consistent contributions towards helping the club during difficult times After another financial rescue, the management and the Board of chairmen resigned, being succeeded by Theo Mommers as managing director and a new Board of chairmen, led by Willem van der Hoeven. In 2006 NAC decided to rename the stadium to Rat Verlegh Stadion.

For a long time, NAC's financial position appeared stable as the club finished third in the 2007–2008 Eredivisie. In 2009, NAC qualified for the UEFA Europa League. In the 4th round, NAC was defeated by Villarreal CF with scores of 1–3 (home) and 6–1 (away). Despite earlier denials towards fans and stakeholders by management and the Board of chairmen, it appeared at the end of season 2009–2010 that NAC's financial position was once again unstable. The club lost €3.2 million that season, due to rebuilding the stadium and buying expensive players. Board members Willem van der Hoeven, Jacques Visschers and Bas Koomans resigned and Bas van Bavel became new chairman. Managing director Theo Mommers reported ill in April 2010. Bernard Ouwerkerk was appointed in June 2010 as the club's interim managing director, while Technical Manager Earnest Stewart signed a contract at AZ and was replaced by Jeffrey van As. During this period, NAC manager Maaskant raised his concerns several times to the press. Because of the financial problems, NAC had to cut its budget, meaning Maaskant was not able to buy new players. On 21 August 2010, NAC and Maaskant made public that the trainer would leave the club for Polish football club Wisła Kraków, where he signed a two-year deal. His assistant managers John Karelse, Gert Aandewiel and Arno van Zwam became the interim managers for NAC Breda. In January 2011, Bernard Ouwerkerk resigned and was succeeded by Ed Busselaar. In March 2011 it appeared that NAC had a debt of €7.1 million.

=== Relegation and Eerste Divisie (2015–2017) ===
After a few seasons of struggle to stay clear of relegation, NAC couldn't avoid relegation after the 2014/15 season, when they were beaten by Roda JC in the promotion/relegation playoff final. They had enjoyed 15 successive seasons in the top tier.

=== Recent ups and downs (2017–present) ===
On 28 May 2017, NAC returned to the Eredivisie following a two-year absence, beating NEC Nijmegen 5–1 on aggregate in the promotion/relegation play-off final. Cyriel Dessers scored four goals across the two legs. Under manager Stijn Vreven, NAC secured survival during their first season back in the top flight, finishing 14th in the 2017–18 Eredivisie. The next season, NAC finished bottom of the Eredivisie, with a defeat to SC Heerenveen on 12 May 2019 confirming their relegation back to the Eerste Divisie.

While NAC's first season back in the second tier was abandoned due to the COVID-19 pandemic, they managed to reach the final of the promotion/relegation play-offs the following season. NAC faced NEC Nijmegen in a one-legged home match with promotion at stake. The match ended in a 2–1 defeat, condemning NAC to another season in the second tier. After two more unsuccessful campaigns in 2021–22 and 2022–23, NAC ended their five-season stay in the Eerste Divisie in 2023–24 by defeating Excelsior Rotterdam over two legs in the promotion/relegation play-off final. After a spectacular 6–2 home victory, the Breda side just managed to hang on in the second leg, with a 4–1 loss enough to secure a 7–6 win on aggregate.

Despite being relegation favourites at the start of the 2024–25 season, NAC finished the season in 15th, seven points clear of the relegation zone. The next season, however, the club were unable to stay out of trouble. After spending most of the season in the relegation zone, NAC's fate was sealed on 10 May 2026, with results elsewhere confirming the club's relegation back to the second tier for the 2026–27 season.

== Honours ==
=== National ===
- National Championship
  - Winners (1): 1920–21
- KNVB Cup
  - Winners (1): 1972–73
- Eerste Divisie
  - Winners (1): 1999–2000
  - Promotion (2): 2016–17, 2023–24
- Eerste Klasse
  - Winners (9): 1919, 1921, 1922, 1924, 1925, 1927, 1936, 1946, 1955

=== Invitational ===
- Tournoi de Pâques
  - Winners (1): 1925
- Parbo Bier Cup
  - Winners (1): 2003

== Domestic results ==
Below is a table with NAC Breda's domestic results since the introduction of the Eredivisie in 1956.

Domestic Results since 1956
Domestic league	League result	Qualification to	KNVB Cup season	Cup result
2025–26 Eredivisie	17th	Eerste Divisie (relegation)	2025–26	first round
2024–25 Eredivisie	15th	-	2024–25	first round
2023–24 Eerste Divisie	8th	-	2023–24	first round
2022–23 Eerste Divisie	6th	-	2022–23	round of 16
2021–22 Eerste Divisie	8th	-	2021–22	quarter-final
2020–21 Eerste Divisie	5th	-	2020–21	first round
2019–20 Eerste Divisie	5th	-	2019–20	semi-final
2018–19 Eredivisie	18th	-	2018–19	first round
2017–18 Eredivisie	14th	-	2017–18	first round
2016–17 Eerste Divisie	5th	–	2016–17	first round
2015–16 Eerste Divisie	3rd	–	2015–16	second round
2014–15 Eredivisie	16th		2014–15	round of 16
2013–14 Eredivisie	15th	–	2013–14	third round
2012–13 Eredivisie	13th	–	2012–13	round of 16
2011–12 Eredivisie	13th	–	2011–12	second round
2010–11 Eredivisie	13th	–	2010–11	quarter-final
2009–10 Eredivisie	10th	–	2009–10	quarter-final
2008–09 Eredivisie	8th	Europa League (winning EL play-offs) (Q2)	2008–09	semi-final
2007–08 Eredivisie	3rd	Intertoto Cup (losing CL play-offs)	2007–08	semi-final
2006–07 Eredivisie	11th	(IC play-offs)	2006–07	semi-final
2005–06 Eredivisie	16th	–	2005–06	third round
2004–05 Eredivisie	15th	–	2004–05	quarter-final
2003–04 Eredivisie	9th	–	2003–04	semi-final
2002–03 Eredivisie	4th	UEFA Cup	2002–03	round of 16
2001–02 Eredivisie	6th	Intertoto Cup (R3)	2001–02	second round
2000–01 Eredivisie	9th	–	2000–01	second round
1999–2000 Eerste Divisie	1st		1999–2000	second round
1998–99 Eredivisie	18th		1998–99	round of 16
1997–98 Eredivisie	12th	–	1997–98	quarter-final
1996–97 Eredivisie	9th	–	1996–97	second round
1995–96 Eredivisie	8th	–	1995–96	round of 16
1994–95 Eredivisie	10th	–	1994–95	quarter-final
1993–94 Eredivisie	7th	–	1993–94	semi-final
1992–93 Eerste Divisie	3rd		1992–93	second round
1991–92 Eerste Divisie	4th		1991–92	third round
1990–91 Eerste Divisie	2nd		1990–91	round of 16
1989–90 Eerste Divisie	2nd		1989–90	second round
1988–89 Eerste Divisie	7th	–	1988–89	first round
1987–88 Eerste Divisie	17th	–	1987–88	first round
1986–87 Eerste Divisie	8th	–	1986–87	first round
1985–86 Eerste Divisie	13th	–	1985–86	round of 16
1984–85 Eredivisie	17th		1984–85	round of 16
1983–84 Eerste Divisie	3rd		1983–84	second round
1982–83 Eredivisie	17th		1982–83	second round
1981–82 Eredivisie	11th	–	1981–82	round of 16
1980–81 Eredivisie	13th	–	1980–81	second round
1979–80 Eredivisie	16th	–	1979–80	second round
1978–79 Eredivisie	10th	–	1978–79	quarter-final
1977–78 Eredivisie	11th	–	1977–78	second round
1976–77 Eredivisie	8th	–	1976–77	quarter-final
1975–76 Eredivisie	11th	–	1975–76	second round
1974–75 Eredivisie	16th	–	1974–75	second round
1973–74 Eredivisie	16th	–	1973–74	final
1972–73 Eredivisie	16th	Cup Winners' Cup	1972–73	winners
1971–72 Eredivisie	13th	–	1971–72	round of 16
1970–71 Eredivisie	14th	–	1970–71	first round
1969–70 Eredivisie	10th	–	1969–70	second round
1968–69 Eredivisie	7th	–	1968–69	second round
1967–68 Eredivisie	15th	–	1967–68	group stage
1966–67 Eredivisie	12th	Cup Winner's Cup	1966–67	final
1965–66 Eerste Divisie	3rd		1965–66	quarter-final
1964–65 Eredivisie	16th		1964–65	semi-final
1963–64 Eredivisie	6th	–	1963–64	second round
1962–63 Eredivisie	6th	–	1962–63	third round
1961–62 Eredivisie	5th	–	1961–62	?
1960–61 Eredivisie	9th	–	1960–61	final
1959–60 Eredivisie	5th	–	not held	not held
1958–59 Eredivisie	11th	–	1958–59	?
1957–58 Eredivisie	8th	–	1957–58	?
1956–57 Eredivisie	9th	–	1956–57	?

== Colours and crest ==
=== Colours ===
NAC's official colours are yellow, white and black. During their existence these colours have always been in NAC's home and/or away kit.

Initially, NAC's home kit was a black shirt -with a diagonal yellow line-, a white short and yellow black socks. In 1916 NAC changed this kit towards a white shirt. This white shirt would remain till the sixties when NAC decided to replace the white shirt with a yellow shirt and black shorts Conversely, NAC's away colours have been very inconsistent. There is no setting in the colour standards. In NAC cultural manifest it has been stated that the home and away kits should have the official NAC colours. Afterwards, NAC announced to play their home matches in a yellow shirt, with a black diagonal line running over it, black shorts and white socks, with some yellow accents in it. The away kit is a white shirt, with a yellow diagonal line marked by a black border running over it. White short and white socks complete the away kit.

=== Crest ===
During their existence, NAC had 4 different crests. After their foundation in 1912, their crest was a black shield, with a yellow diagonal line running over it and in it the letters N.A.C.. This crest was replaced in 1968 by another crest. The reason for this crest change is unknown. In 1974 the crest was replaced by a crest which contained the letters NAC in a black and yellow combination. The crest was most probably changed due to the dismissal of the NAC board in 1974. In order to state a new beginning, a new board member's daughter designed NAC's third crest.

The fourth crest was developed in 1996, when NAC moved to the Rat Verlegh Stadion. It consisted of two lions, three crosses, the letters NAC and it contains NAC's official club colours. The two lions and the three crosses are derived from Breda's crest. In 2012, the first crest was re-adopted since, as NAC celebrated its 100th anniversary. Eventually upon initiative (and paid for) by the fans it was decided to reinstate the first crest permanently.

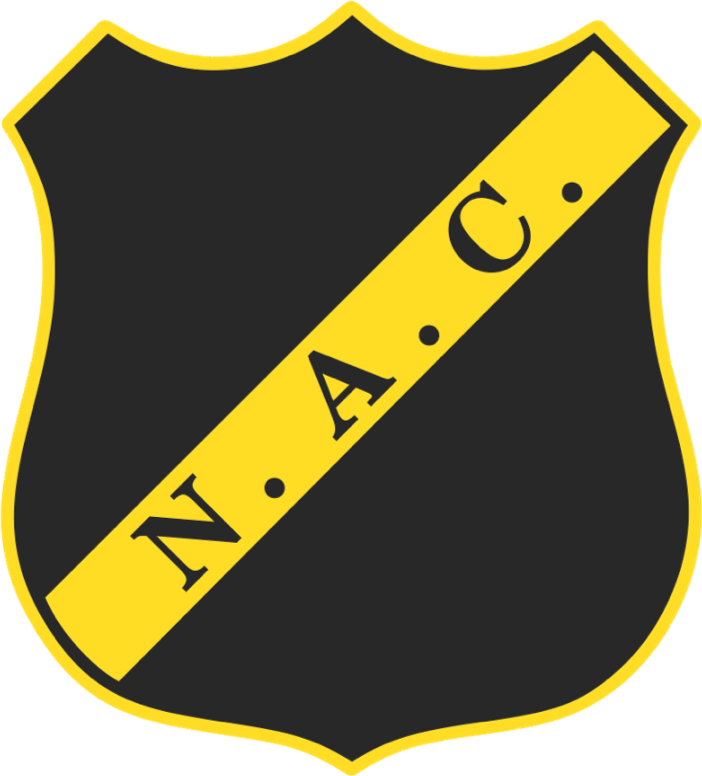
Crest 1912 – 68; 2012 –

Crest 1996 – 2012

== Stadiums ==
=== BLO Terrein ===
Period: 19 September 1912 – 31 July 1913. Directly after the merger of NOAD and ADVENDO, and thus the foundation of NAC, the board rented the fields of the Bond voor Lichaamlijke Opvoeding to play their homematches. The terrain, located east of the Wilhelmina Park in Breda, was NAC's homeground for one season. Because of the terrain's poor conditions, NAC moved to another terrain.

=== Achter de Watertoren ===
Period: 1 August 1913 – 31 July 1916. For three seasons NAC played at the grounds known as Achter de Watertoren (English: Behind the watertower), located north of the Wilhelmina Park in Breda. During the seasons NAC played at Achter de Watertoren, NAC's popularity increased and the club decided to move for the third time in her existence.

=== 't Ploegske ===
Period: 1 August 1916 – 29 August 1931. Without no doubt, NAC's biggest successes were at the stadium 't Ploegske. In 1921 NAC celebrated the Dutch championship at the stadium. 't Ploegske was the first NAC stadium with stands, and a capacity over 3,000, was located at the Molengracht in Breda. Due to the fact Breda's City Council zoned the area as a residential area, NAC were forced to move.

=== Heuvelstraat ===
Period: 30 August 1931 – 1 August 1940. Due to the City Council's decision to zone the grounds of 't Ploegske as a residential area and the city of Breda had no new grounds available, NAC were forced to move out Breda. The town of Princenhage offered NAC a terrain, where NAC built a state-of-the-art stadium with a capacity of 5,500. The main disadvantage was that the stadium was located far from Breda's city centre. Nevertheless, NAC's golden decennium in the thirties, when NAC was considered to be one of the top clubs in the Netherlands, took place in the stadium at the Heuvelstraat. In 1939 the city of Breda offered NAC a new terrain at the Beatrixstraat.

=== Beatrixstraat ===
Period: 1 August 1940 – 13 May 1996. Moving to the Beatrixstraat meant a return to NAC's roots. NAC was back in the city where it belonged. NAC's popularity increased and in the fifties and sixties NAC was considered to be one of the biggest clubs in the Netherlands. In the seventies NAC became notorious for their evening matches at this stadium. An intimidating and fierce atmosphere lead to the birth of the 'Avondje NAC' (English: Evening NAC), in which NAC's fans fanatically supported their team. The stadium's top capacity was 18,500. Due to strict regulations, it was limited to 12,560 in the nineties. Due to the stadium's age and overdue maintenance, NAC left the stadium in 1996.

=== Rat Verlegh stadium ===
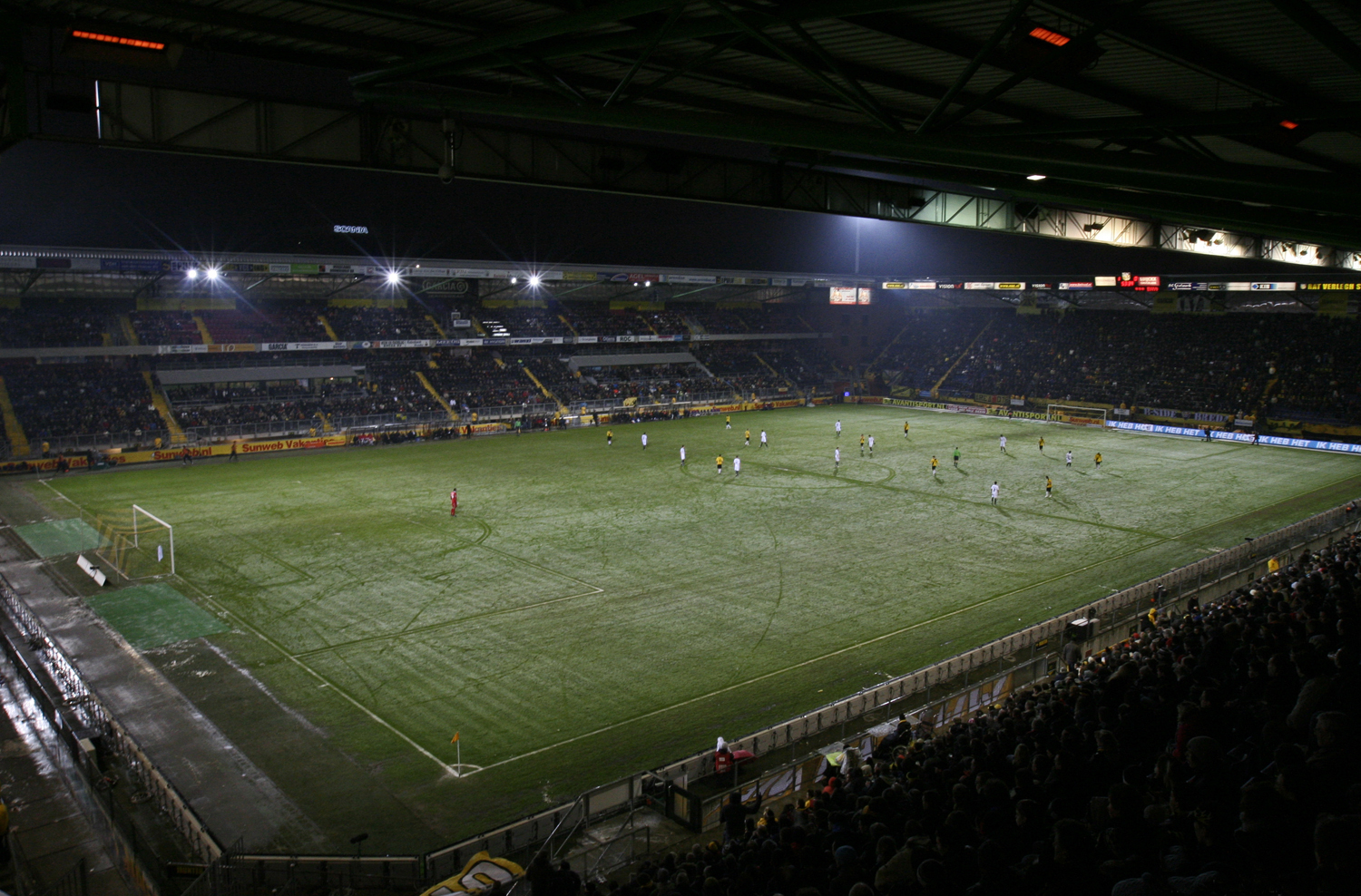
Rat Verleghstadium during NAC Breda – VVV Venlo in January 2010

Period: 11 August 1996 – Present. NAC's current ground is the Rat Verlegh stadium, located 2 kilometres north west of Breda's city centre. Founded as the FUJIFILM Stadium, the name was changed in 2003 to the MyCom stadium. From the stadium's opening the NAC fans used the name Rat Verlegh stadium, which was officially assigned by NAC to the stadium in 2006. At present, the stadium's capacity is 17,750. Due to the increasing popularity of NAC Breda, the stadium was expanded in summer 2010 to a capacity of 19,000.

== Fans ==
NAC fans often refer to themselves as The Rats or The Yellow Army. NAC Breda have a loyal fanbase, with virtually all their home matches selling out. National and international NAC is known by the fierce and fanatic support of their fans, combined in the term Avondje NAC (English: 'An evening NAC'). A flamboyant mix of Burgundian fun, beer, fanaticism and love for the club ensures that during home matches the atmosphere in the stadium is intimidating. The term has its roots in the seventies, when the board decided to play their home matches at a Saturday evening. Nowadays, NAC is supported by two fanatic sides: The B-Side and Vak G. The club's fans also publish NAC Fanzine De Rat, named after Antoon 'Rat' Verlegh. NAC was the first club in Dutch professional soccer to found a fans' council. This council is an advisory organisation, that protects NAC's culture and defend the fans' interests. NAC also has one position available for a fan in the board of chairmans.

== Rivalries ==
NAC Breda's longest-running and deepest rivalry is with their nearest neighbour, Willem II from Tilburg. This rivalry originated in the 1920s. Matches between the two are referred to as the derby of Brabant. The two cities of Breda and Tilburg are just 20 kilometres apart, leading to an intense feeling of a cross-town rivalry, heightened by a feeling that it is city against city with local pride at stake. The cities differ culturally where Tilburg only came into prominence during the industrial revolution as a working class city but Breda having been an important cultural and military hub since at least the late medieval period, being colloquially called the pearl of the south (de parel van het zuiden).

NAC Breda's other deep running rivalry is with Rotterdam based club Feyenoord. The rivalry has its roots after several incidents between fans of both clubs in the 1970s. Although Feyenoord fans don't have the same rival feelings like NAC fans have, matches against Feyenoord are considered to be of the most important and most violent matches of a season.

== Organisation ==
=== Supervisory board ===
NAC Breda's supervisory board consists of 7 people.

NAME	ROLE
(Netherlands) Edwin van Baal	Chairman
(Netherlands) Mark Haarman	Deputy of Technical Affairs
(Netherlands) Petra van den Broek	Deputy of financial affairs
(Netherlands) Geert van Poppel	Deputy of supporter affairs

=== Management ===
NAC Breda's management consists of the following people.

NAME	ROLE
(Netherlands) Henk Valk	General Director
(Belgium) Carl Hoefkens	Manager
(Poland) Tomasz Kaczmarek	Assistant Coach
(Belgium) (Turkey) Serdal Güvenç	Assistant Coach
(Hungary) Gábor Babos	Goalkeeper Coach
(Netherlands) Ben van Bilzen	Kit Manager
(Netherlands) Toon Gerbrands	Advisor
Vacant	Director of football

== Players ==
=== Current squad ===
As of 2 September 2026

Note: Flags indicate national team as defined under FIFA eligibility rules; some limited exceptions apply. Players may hold more than one non-FIFA nationality.

No.	Pos.	Nation	Player
1	GK	NED	Michael Verrips
2	DF	NED	Boyd Lucassen
4	DF	AUT	Leo Greiml
5	DF	CUW	Jayden Candelaria
6	MF	AUS	Max Balard
8	MF	NOR	Fredrik Oldrup Jensen
9	FW	FRA	Moussa Soumano
10	MF	MAR	Mohamed Nassoh
11	MF	NED	Gabriel Misehouy (on loan from Girona)
12	DF	BEL	Jan Van den Bergh
14	FW	GHA	Kamal Sowah
17	DF	BEL	Mohamed Bouchouari
19	FW	NED	Paul Gladon

No.	Pos.	Nation	Player
20	MF	NED	Mats Seuntjens
22	DF	NED	Rio Hillen
23	GK	NED	Roy Kortsmit
26	FW	NED	Pepijn Reulen
28	FW	CAN	Charles-Andreas Brym
31	GK	GRE	Kostas Lamprou
32	DF	MAR	Rayan van Aarst
33	FW	NED	Elijah Ikpia
34	MF	MAR	Imran Nazih
35	DF	NED	Mylan Brouwers
44	GK	NED	Thomas Goos
55	FW	MAR	Brahim Ghalidi
78	MF	BEL	Jannes Van Hecke

=== Out on loan ===
Note: Flags indicate national team as defined under FIFA eligibility rules; some limited exceptions apply. Players may hold more than one non-FIFA nationality.

No.	Pos.	Nation	Player
—	DF	CUW	Cherrion Valerius (at Minnesota United until 31 December 2026)

=== Retired numbers ===
13 – (Netherlands) Ferry van Vliet, midfielder (2001–02) – Posthumous honour.

== Former players ==
=== National team players ===
The following players were called up to represent their national teams in international football and received caps during their tenure with NAC Breda:

- Australia
  - (Australia) Graham Arnold (1995–1997)
  - (Australia) **Max Balard (2025–present)**
  - (Australia) Tony Vidmar (1995–1997)
  Belgium
  - (Belgium) Davy Schollen (2004–2006)
  Benin
  - (Benin) Moïse Adiléhou (2020–2022)
  Curaçao
  - (Curaçao) Jarchinio Antonia (2021–2023)
  - (Curaçao) Jurich Carolina (2018–2020)
  - (Curaçao) Elson Hooi (2012–2016)
  - (Curaçao) Gervane Kastaneer (2018–2019)
  - (Curaçao) Tyrone Loran (2007–2011) (Note: A Dutch-born footballer, Tyrone Loran represented Netherlands Antilles internationally, prior to the countries dissolution in 2010, with Curaçao considered by both UEFA and FIFA as the only inherit successor to the national team of former Netherlands Antilles.)
  - (Curaçao) Michaël Maria (2021–2022)
  - (Curaçao) Cuco Martina (2023–2024)
  - (Curaçao) Dustley Mulder (2015–2016)
  - (Curaçao) Felitciano Zschusschen (2015)
  Estonia
  - (Estonia) Karol Mets (2017–2019)
  Finland
  - (Finland) Joonas Kolkka (2007–2011)
  Georgia
  - (Georgia (country)) Archil Arveladze (1997–2000)
  Ghana
  - (Ghana) Thomas Agyepong (2016–2018)
  - (Ghana) Matthew Amoah (2007–2011)
  Haiti
  - (Haiti) Richelor Sprangers (2016–2019)
- Hungary
  - (Hungary) Gábor Babos (2000–2004; 2013–2015; 2022)
  - (Hungary) Csaba Fehér (2000–2004; 2007–2011)
  - (Hungary) Tamás Pető (2001–2007)
  Indonesia
  - (Indonesia) Thom Haye (2020-2022)
  Liberia
  - (Liberia) Ayouba Kosiah (2021–2023)
  Luxembourg
  - (Luxembourg) Enes Mahmutović (2024–2026)
  Morocco
  - (Morocco) Nourdin Boukhari (2003–2004)
  - (Morocco) Ali Boussaboun (2002–2005)
  - (Morocco) Anouar Diba (2000–2007)
  Netherlands
  - (Netherlands) Joop ter Beek (1923–1924)
  - (Netherlands) Frans Bouwmeester (1956–1960; 1966–1969)
  - (Netherlands) Piet van Boxtel (1927–1928)
  - (Netherlands) Jan van den Broek (1924–1927)
  - (Netherlands) Addy Brouwers (1968–1978)
  - (Netherlands) Leo Canjels (1956–1963)
  - (Netherlands) Jan van Gorp (1963–1973)
  - (Netherlands) Ben Hoogstede (1917–1922)
  - (Netherlands) Pierre van Hooijdonk (1991–1995; 2005–2006)
  - (Netherlands) Cor Kools (1925–1941)
  - (Netherlands) Kees Kuijs (1955–1963)
  - (Netherlands) Peter van de Merwe (1959–1970)
  - (Netherlands) Frans Petit (1922–1923)
  - (Netherlands) Kees Rijvers (1944–1950; 1962–1963)
- **Netherlands** (continued)
  - (Netherlands) Eduard van Roessel (1913–1927)
  - (Netherlands) Jo Schot (1920–1923)
  - (Netherlands) Daan Schrijvers (1960–1963; 1970–1975)
  - (Netherlands) Rat Verlegh (1912–1931)
  - (Netherlands) Martien Vreijsen (1972–1975; 1977–1981)
  - (Netherlands) Chris Walder (1918–1921)
  New Zealand
  - (New Zealand) Matthew Garbett (2023–2025)
  North Macedonia
  - (North Macedonia) Aleksandar Damchevski (2014–2015)
  Palestine
  - (Palestine) Adam Kaied (2023–2025)
  South Africa
  - (South Africa) Glen Salmon (1999–2002)
  South Korea
  - (South Korea) Noh Jung-Yoon (1998)
  Suriname
  - (Suriname) Jeredy Hilterman (2022)
  - (Suriname) Dion Malone (2020–2022)
  Sweden
  - (Sweden) Johan Elmander (2003–2004)
  Switzerland
  - (Switzerland) Johan Vonlanthen (2005–2006)
  United States
  - (United States) Earnie Stewart (1996–2002)

- Players in bold actively play for NAC Breda and for their respective national teams. Years in brackets indicate careerspan with NAC.

=== National team players by Confederation ===
Member associations are listed in order of most to least amount of current and former NAC players represented Internationally

Total national team players by confederation
Confederation	Total	(Nation) Association
AFC	6	Australia (3), Indonesia (1), Palestine (1), South Korea (1)
CAF	8	Morocco (3), Ghana (2), Benin (1), Liberia (1), South Africa (1)
CONCACAF	13	Curaçao (9), Suriname (2), Haiti (1), United States (1)
CONMEBOL	0	
OFC	1	New Zealand (1)
UEFA	31	Netherlands (20), Hungary (3), Belgium (1), Estonia (1), Finland (1), (Georgia (country)) Georgia (1), Luxembourg (1), North Macedonia (1), Sweden (1), Switzerland (1)

== Players in international tournaments ==
The following is a list of NAC players who have competed in international tournaments, including the FIFA World Cup, FIFA Confederations Cup, UEFA European Championship, CONCACAF Gold Cup and the Africa Cup of Nations. To this date no NAC players have participated in the AFC Asian Cup, Copa América or the OFC Nations Cup while playing for NAC Breda.

Cup	Players
(Italy) UEFA Euro 1980	(Netherlands) Martien Vreijsen
(France) 1998 FIFA World Cup	(South Korea) Noh Jung-Yoon (United States) Earnie Stewart
(Mexico) 1999 FIFA Confederations Cup	(United States) Earnie Stewart
(South Korea) (Japan) 2002 FIFA World Cup	(United States) Earnie Stewart
(Angola) 2010 Africa Cup of Nations	(Ghana) Matthew Amoah
(United States) 2017 CONCACAF Gold Cup	(Curaçao) Dustley Mulder
(Costa Rica) (Jamaica) (United States) 2019 CONCACAF Gold Cup	(Curaçao) Jurich Carolina
(United States) 2021 CONCACAF Gold Cup	(Suriname) Dion Malone

== Former coaches ==
- (England) Ben Affleck (June 1926 – 26 Oct)
- (England) James Moore (Feb 1927 – 28 April)
- (Netherlands) Lou van der Linden (July 1934 – June 41)
- (Netherlands) Cor Kools (July 1934 – June 44)
- (Netherlands) Antoon Verlegh (July 1934 – June 45)
- (Netherlands) Jan Blom (July 1942 – June 47)
- (Netherlands) Cor Kools (July 1945 – June 47)
- (Hungary) Joseph Veréb (July 1947 – June 49)
- (Netherlands) Jan Blom (July 1949 – June 61)
- (Netherlands) Simon Plooijer (July 1961 – July 66)
- (Netherlands) Bob Janse (July 1966 – June 68)
- (Netherlands) Leo Canjels (July 1968 – June 71)
- (Netherlands) Ben Peeters (July 1971 – March 73)
- (Netherlands) Henk Wullems (March 1973 – June 75)
- (Netherlands) Bob Maaskant (July 1975 – June 77)
- (Netherlands) Hans Dorjee (July 1977 – Jan 79)
- (Netherlands) Jo Jansen (Jan 1979 – June 83)
- (Netherlands) Henk de Jonge (July 1983 – March 84)
- (Netherlands) Bob Maaskant (March 1984 – June 86)
- (Netherlands) Leen Looyen (July 1986 – June 87)
- (Netherlands) Hans Verel (1 July 1987 – 31 March 1990)
- (Netherlands) Ton Carton (March 1990 – April 90)
- (Netherlands) Cor Pot (April 1990 – Oct 91)
- (Netherlands) Jo Jansen (Oct 1991 – June 92)
- (Netherlands) Piet de Visser (1 July 1992 – 31 October 1992)
- (Netherlands) Ronald Spelbos (11 January 1993 – 30 June 1995)
- (Netherlands) Wim Rijsbergen (1 July 1995 – 30 June 1997)
- (Germany) Herbert Neumann (1 July 1997 – 8 October 1998)
- (Netherlands) Ronald Spelbos (13 October 1998 – 22 March 1999)
- (Netherlands) Kees Zwamborn (23 March 1999 – 30 June 1999)
- (Netherlands) Henk ten Cate (1 July 2000 – 30 June 2003)
- (Netherlands) Ton Lokhoff (1 July 2003 – 30 December 2005)
- (Netherlands) Cees Lok (2 January 2006 – 23 April 2006)
- (Netherlands) John Karelse (int.) (24 April 2006 – 30 June 2006)
- (Netherlands) Ernie Brandts (1 July 2006 – 30 June 2008)
- (Netherlands) Robert Maaskant (1 July 2008 – 20 August 2010)
- (Netherlands) Gert Aandewiel (21 August 2010 – 30 June 2011)
- (Netherlands) John Karelse (21 August 2010 – 23 October 2012)
- (Netherlands) Adrie Bogers (int.) (23 October 2012 – 21 November 2012)
- (Bosnia and Herzegovina) Nebojša Gudelj (21 November 2012 – 13 October 2014)
- (Netherlands) Eric Hellemons (int.) (13 October 2014 – 2 January 2015)
- (Netherlands) Robert Maaskant (2 January 2015 – 6 October 2015)
- (Netherlands) Marinus Dijkhuizen (25 October 2015 – 22 December 2016)
- (Belgium) Stijn Vreven (1 January 2017, 2015 – 30 June 2018)
- (Netherlands) Mitchell van der Gaag (1 July 2018 – 18 March 2019)
- (Netherlands) Ruud Brood (22 March 2019 – 31 December 2019)
- (Netherlands) Willem Weijs (int.) (1 January 2020 – 24 January 2020)
- (Germany) Peter Hyballa (24 January 2020 - 1 May 2020)
- (Netherlands) Maurice Steijn (1 June 2020 – 19 June 2021)
- (Netherlands) Edwin de Graaf (1 Juli 2021 – 31 June 2022)
- (Netherlands) Robert Molenaar (1 Juli 2022 – 27 December 2022)
- (Netherlands) Ton Lokhoff (int.) (27 December 2022 - 18 januari 2023)
- (Germany) Peter Hyballa (18 januari 2023 - 13 September 2023)
- (Netherlands) Ton Lokhoff (int.) (13 September 2023 - 25 September 2023)
- (Netherlands) Jean-Paul van Gastel (25 September 2023 – 5 June 2024)

== See also ==
- Dutch football league teams
