= Addy Brouwers =

Dutch footballer

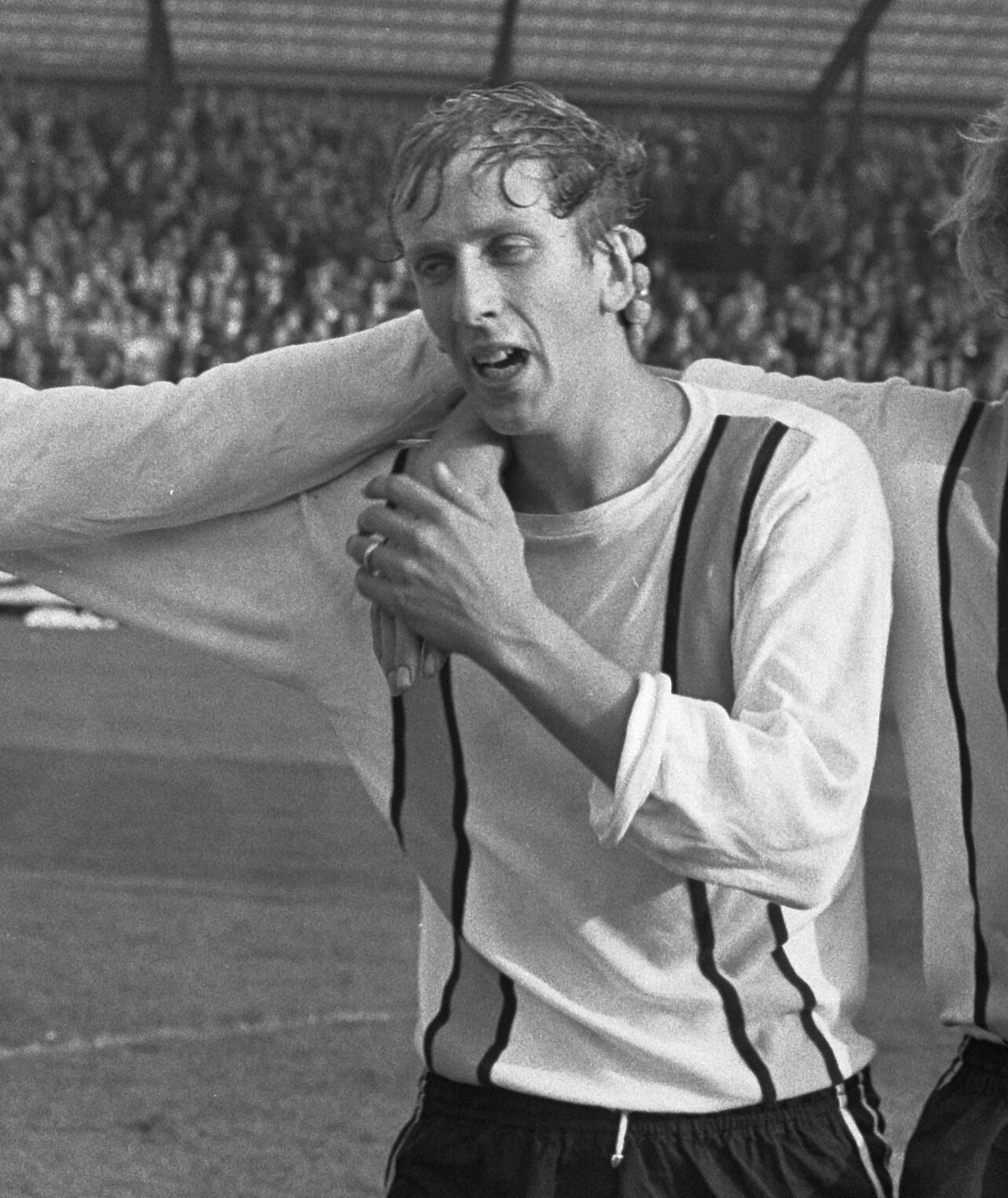
- Brouwers with NAC in 1972

Personal information
- Date of birth: 21 January 1946 (age 80)
- Place of birth: Breda, Netherlands
- Position: Midfielder

Senior career*
Years	Team	Apps	(Gls)
1963–1968	Baronie	142	(46)
1968–1978	NAC	312	(47)
Total		454	(93)

International career
1969	Netherlands	1	(0)
- * Club domestic league appearances and goals

Addy Brouwers (born 21 January 1946) is a Dutch retired footballer. He played in one match for the Netherlands national football team in 1969. He won the 1973 KNVB Cup with NAC, scoring once in the final against NEC.

After retiring as a player, Brouwers worked as a scout for NAC.
