= Willem van der Hoeven =

Dutch businessman

Willem van der Hoeven (born 11 May 1944 in Breda) is a Dutch former manager, former CEO and former chairman of Dutch Eredivisie club NAC Breda.

== NAC Breda chairmanship ==
On 11 April 2003 NAC Breda announced that van der Hoeven was signed as new interim manager. NAC Breda, saved from bankruptcy a few months earlier, appointed van der Hoeven to lead the organizational and the Financial restructure of the club. On 1 October 2003 Willem van der Hoeven succeeded Ben Hennekam as chairman of NAC Breda and fulfilled a double role as chairman and interim manager. With the appointment of Theo Mommers as new general manager of NAC Breda, van der Hoeven transferred his interim management duties to the current general manager. In his role as chairman, van der Hoeven was responsible for relations with the KNVB, with the Eredivisie, security affairs and personnel affairs.

At the end of season 2009/2010 it appeared, despite earlier denials by management and the chairman, that NAC had a debt of 3.2 million Euros. The crisis lead to the resignation of van der Hoeven as chairman. Van der Hoeven was replaced by Bas van Bavel.

== Other ==
Willem van der Hoeven was also chairman of ‘Breda 750’, the non-profit foundation that organised all festivities of Breda’s 750-year existence.
