= Cor Kools =

Dutch footballer and manager

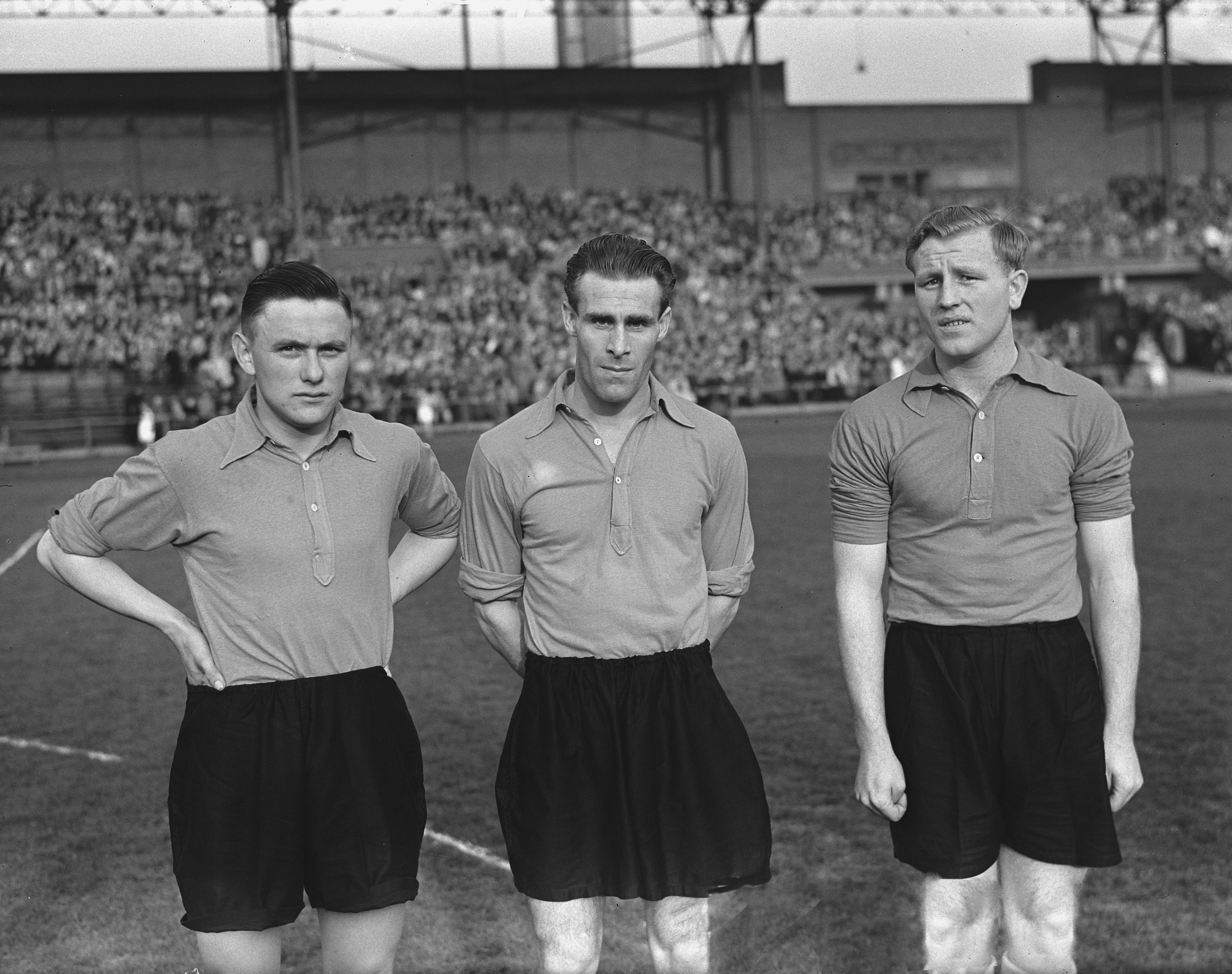

Personal information
- Full name: Cornelis Wilhelmus Kools
- Date of birth: 20 July 1907
- Place of birth: Teteringen, Netherlands
- Date of death: 24 September 1985 (aged 78)
- Place of death: Breda, Netherlands
- Position: Midfielder

Youth career
- 1919–1925: NAC Breda

Senior career*
| Years | Team | Apps | (Gls) |
| 1925–1941 | NAC Breda | 267 | (100) |

International career
| 1928–1930 | Netherlands | 16 | (3) |

Managerial career
- 1934–1944: NAC Breda
- 1945–1947: NAC Breda
- * Club domestic league appearances and goals

Cornelis Wilhelmus "Cor" Kools (Dutch pronunciation: [kɔr ˈkoːls]; 20 July 1907 – 24 September 1985) was a Dutch football player and manager who played his entire career for NAC Breda. Kools played 16 international matches for the Netherlands, scoring three times, and participated in the 1928 Summer Olympics. Kools is also a member of honour of NAC Breda. He died in Breda.

== Association Football ==
=== Youth career ===
Kools was born in the town Teteringen, nowadays part of Breda, and joined NAC Breda at the age of twelve. When playing as a youth player for the club, he developed himself as an all-rounder, who could be placed on every position in the field. His technical skills and his leadership skills made him soon the captain.

=== Senior career ===
At the age of 18, Kools made his debut on 7 March 1928 in the home match against MVV. In 1931 Kools’ career seemed to stop, because he sustained a serious knee injury in the match against NOAD Tilburg. After a surgery in Brussels, Kools was able to play associated football again, but his international career was over. Kools played football until 1941. His entire career he played for NAC Breda, in which he won twice the championship in the 1e Klasse Zuid, reached the semi-finals of the KNVB Cup and was one time a runner-up for the Dutch national championship.

== International career ==
In March 1928, Kools was invited to play for the Dutch national squad. On 28 April 1928, he played his first international match in Amsterdam against Denmark, in which he scored 1 goal. The Netherlands won this match with 2-0. Later that year he played 2 matches against Belgium and Chile in the 1928 Summer Olympics, held in Amsterdam. Until November 1930, he played in every match of the Dutch national team. Due to a serious knee injury he sustained in 1931, he had to end his international career.

== Manager career ==
Kools was two times part of the elftalcommissie of NAC Breda, a committee responsible for training and selecting the 11 best players to play for NAC Breda's first squad. Kools first term in this committee was from 1934 till 1944. His second term was from 1945 till 1947. After his football and manager career, Kools stayed involved with NAC Breda until 1974.
