= Rat Verlegh Stadion =

Multi-purpose stadium in Breda, Netherlands

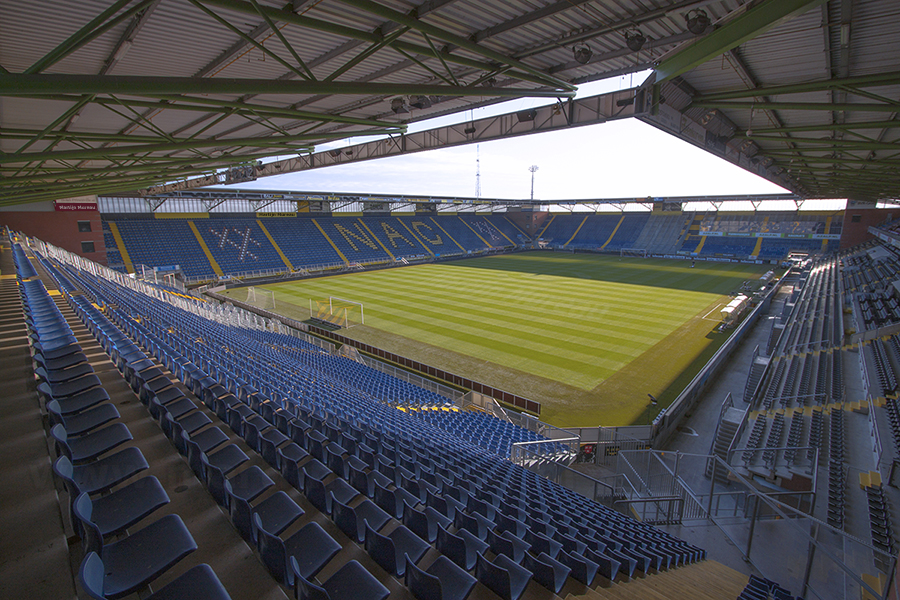
- Interactive map of Rat Verlegh Stadion
- Former names: FUJiFILM-stadion (1996–2003); MyCom-stadion (2003–2006)
- Location: Stadionstraat 23, Breda, Netherlands
- Coordinates: 51°35′42″N 4°45′01″E
- Owner: City of Breda
- Operator: NAC Breda
- Capacity: 20,500
- Surface: 98% Grass, 2% artificial turf
- Scoreboard: LED scoreboards installed early 2020

Construction
- Built: 1995–1996
- Opened: 1 July 1996
- Renovated: 2008–2010
- Cost: €13,200,000 (1996)
- Architect: Bureau Bollen (1995)
- General contractor: Ballast Nedam Bouw B.V.

Tenant
- NAC Breda (1996–present)

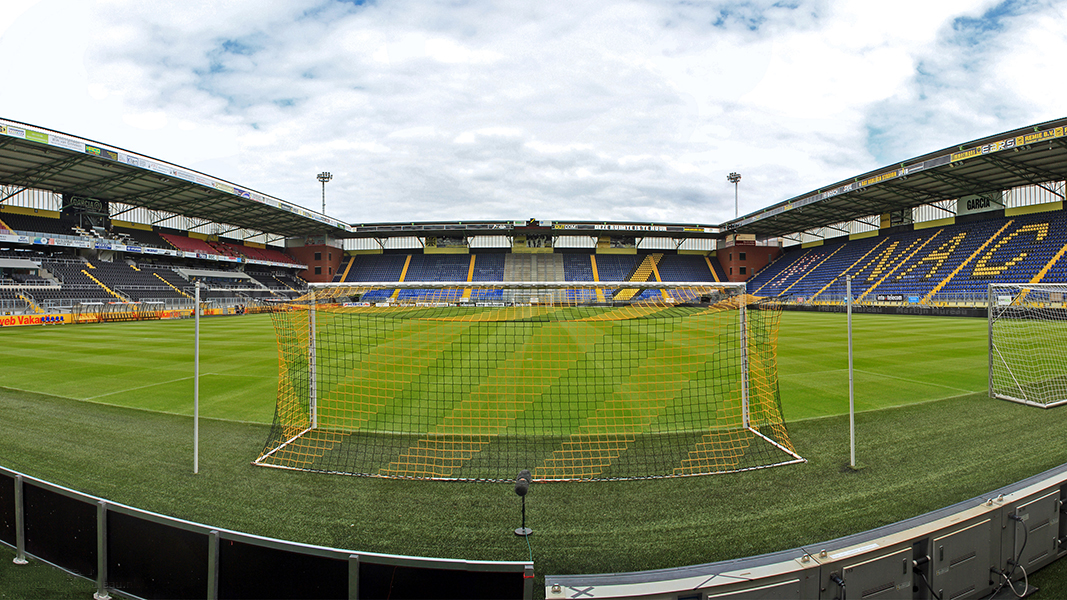
View from the goal of Vak G towards the B-side

The Rat Verlegh Stadion (Dutch pronunciation: [ˌrɑt fərˈlɛx ˌstaːdijɔn]) (Note: Verlegh in isolation: [vərˈlɛx].) is a multi-purpose stadium in Breda, Netherlands. The stadium is the home of the association football club NAC Breda (1996 to present). It was formerly known as FUJIFILM Stadium (1996–2003) and Mycom Stadium (2003–2006), named after two former NAC sponsors. In 2006 NAC Breda named the stadium after its most famous NAC Player, Antoon Verlegh.

The stadium was built from 1995 to 1996 at a cost of € 13.2 million, and was officially opened on 11 August 1996. It has been used for association football, concerts, and other events. It has a capacity of 20,500 fans, including 1,500 standing room-only, for sports matches. The stadium has been used for several Intertoto matches, UEFA Cup matches and international matches. Concerts have also been held at the Rat Verlegh stadion.

== History ==
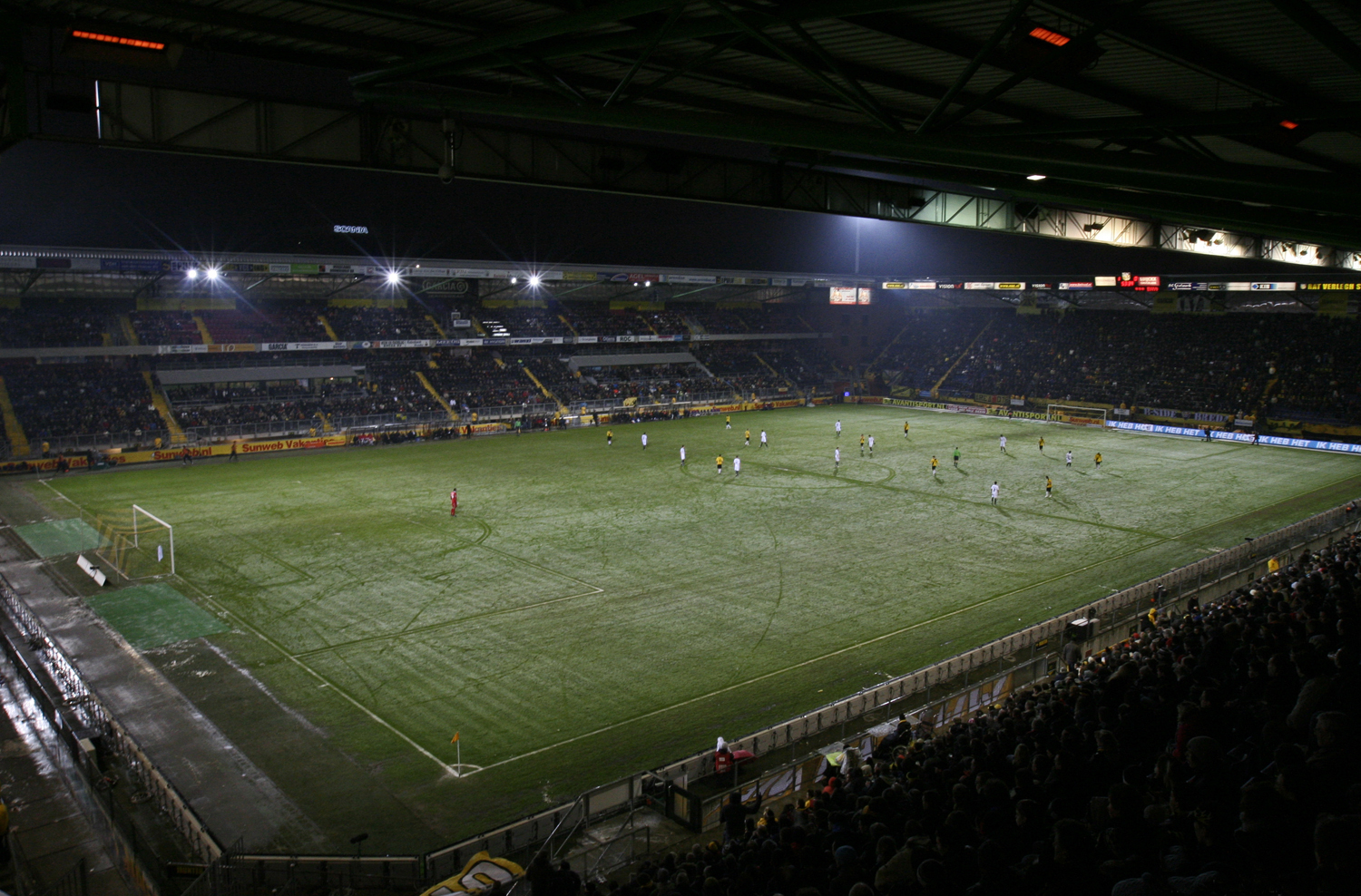
NAC playing a match against VVV during the 2009–10 season.

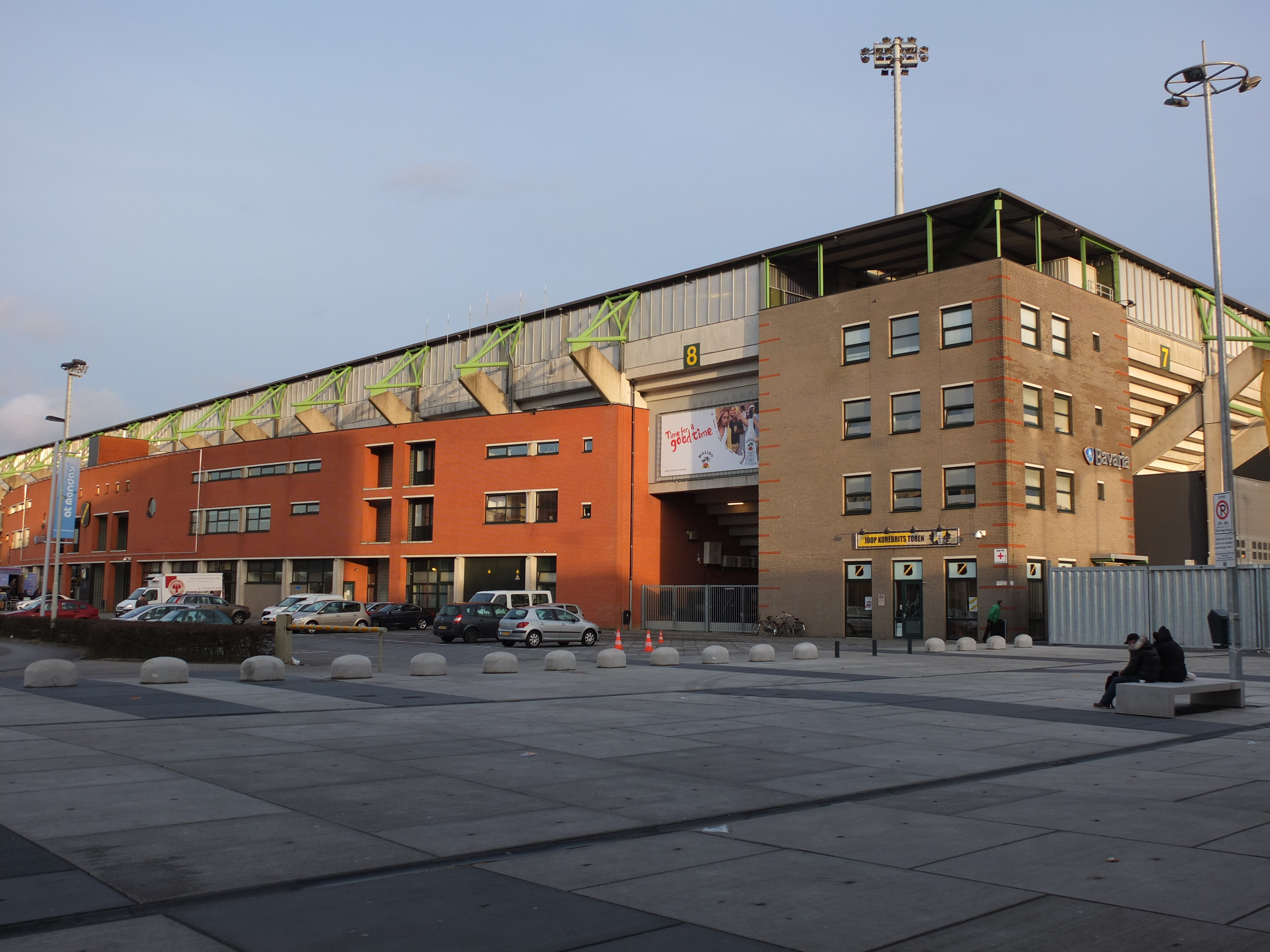
The exterior of the stadium.

In November 1991 NAC Breda's board officially announced that it researched the possibilities to either renovate the NAC Stadion located at the Beatrixstraat, or to build a new stadium within Breda's city borders. Renovation of the original stadium was too costly and in 1993 NAC Breda announced plans to build a new stadium. In mutual agreement with the city of Breda, the grounds near the Lunetstraat in Breda were allocated as the new stadium zone.

On 18 August 1995 the construction of the new stadium began. NAC Breda announced that FUJIFILM had signed a contract for 10 years, in which the stadium's name would be named after NAC's former main sponsor. After a construction period of almost one year, the stadium was officially opened by Breda's mayor Fred Rutten and KNVB chairman Jos Staatsen. After the official opening, NAC Breda played their first match in front of 17,000 fans in the FUJIFILM Stadium against vice World Champion Porto Alegrense Gremio from Brazil.

NAC's first official match was at 16 August 1996 in a Cup tie against Dordrecht 90. NAC player Stanley MacDonald scored the first goal in the new stadium. During its existence, the stadium was host for numerous competition matches, cup ties, friendly matches, but also Intertoto matches, a UEFA Cup match and an international friendly between Ecuador and Turkey. In 2017 the stadium was used for the UEFA Women's Euro 2017 . In total the stadium hosted 4 group matches and 1 semi-final between Denmark and Austria.

In 2003 the stadium was renamed to the Mycom Stadion, at that time a sponsor of NAC Breda. In 2006 the stadium was renamed after NAC's most famous and important player; Antoon 'Rat' Verlegh.

== Renovation ==
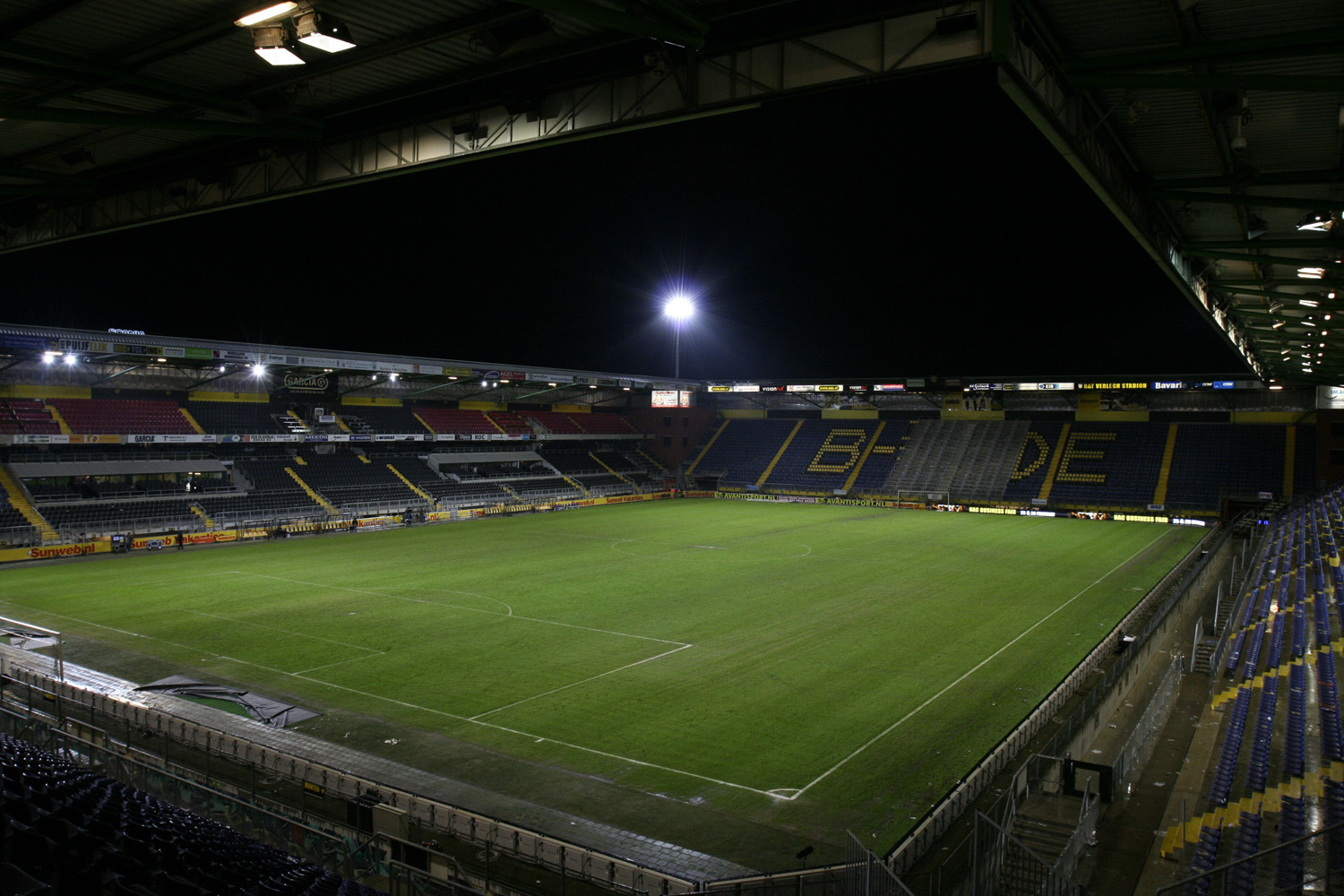
View from Vak G towards the B-side

The stadium was one of the first new stadiums and nowadays has numerous shortcomings. The past years public facilities have been improved. In 2009 NAC Breda announced that the stadium's facilities will be improved further and that the stadium's capacity will be enlarger to 17,750 in 2009 and 19,999 in 2010. Sponsorship facilities will be improved. Also the stadium's environment will be improved and commercial zones will be developed directly around the stadium. An estimated sum of €100 million will be invested in this project. In 2010, despite earlier news from the club the stadium would be expanded to 19,999 places, construction started to expand the stadium to 19,000 places. The construction was finished in July 2010.

== The stadium ==
=== Stands ===
The stadium's lay-out is similar to an average Dutch stadium. On the stands behind the goal the fanatic NAC fans are based. The B-Side is located on the east stand, while Vak G is located on the west stand. Next to Vak G the stand for the opponent's fans is located. The northern stand is reserved for officials and sponsors, while the south stand is reserved for other NAC fans. In season 2009/2010 prices for individual tickets vary from €12,50 to €30.

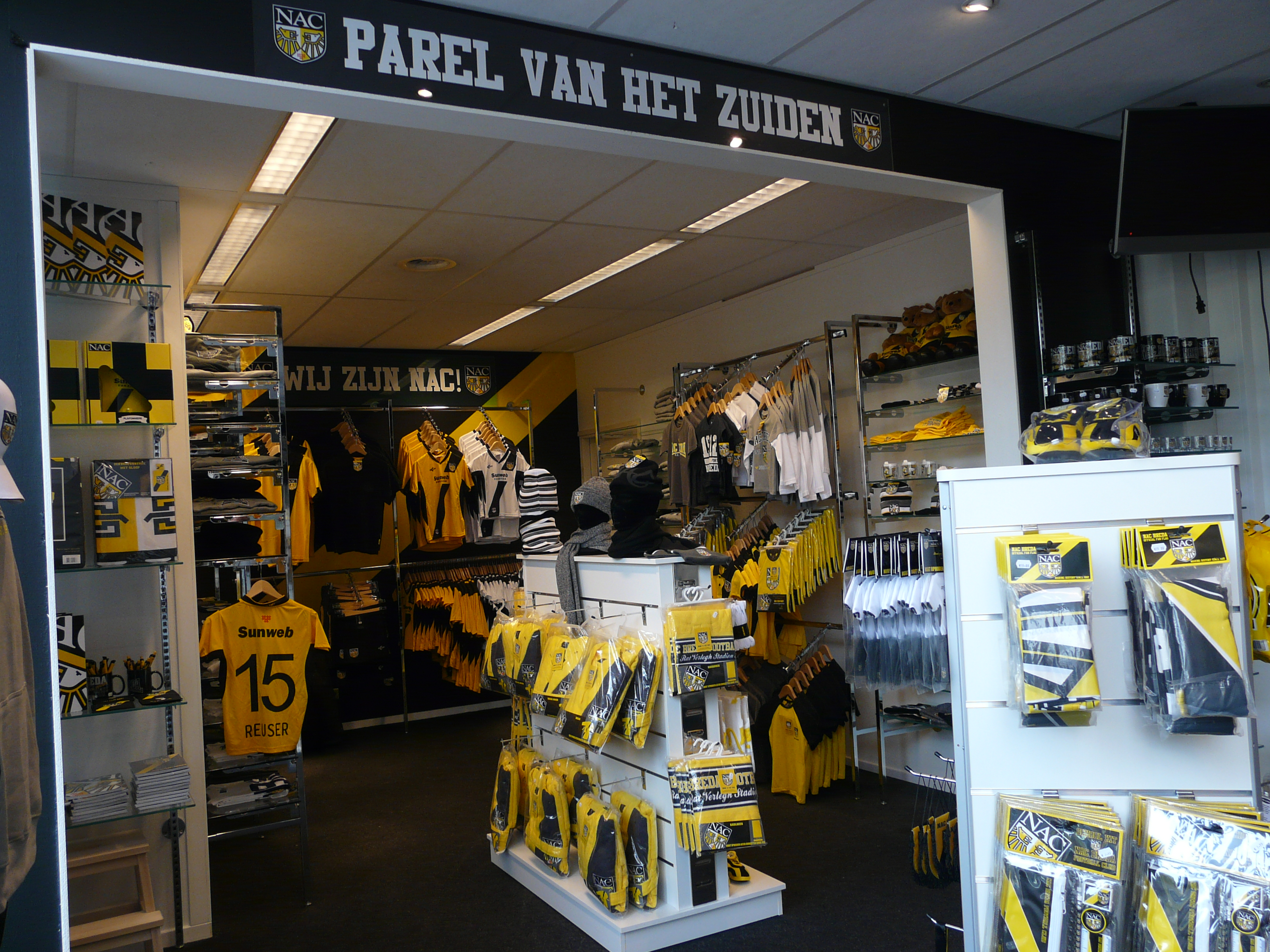
NAC supporter's store

=== Museum ===
Located underneath Vak G, the NAC Museum holds artifacts, photos and movies from NAC's history. The museum is developed and maintained by NAC fans and is sponsored by charity and NAC Breda.

== See also ==
- List of football stadiums in the Netherlands
- Lists of stadiums
