= 1975 UEFA Cup final =

- Event: 1974–75 UEFA Cup
Borussia Mönchengladbach	Twente
(West Germany)	(Netherlands)
5	1
- on aggregate

First leg
Borussia Mönchengladbach	Twente
0	0
- Date: 7 May 1975
- Venue: Rheinstadion, Düsseldorf
- Referee: Károly Palotai (Hungary)
- Attendance: 42,368

Second leg
Twente	Borussia Mönchengladbach
1	5
- Date: 21 May 1975
- Venue: Diekman Stadion, Enschede
- Referee: Paul Schiller (Austria)
- Attendance: 21,767

The 1975 UEFA Cup final was played on 7 May and 21 May 1975 between Borussia Mönchengladbach of West Germany and Twente of the Netherlands. Mönchengladbach won 5–1 on aggregate.

== Route to the final ==
Borussia Mönchengladbach				Round	Twente			
Opponent	Agg.	1st leg	2nd leg		Opponent	Agg.	1st leg	2nd leg
(Austria) Wacker Innsbruck	4–2	1–2 (A)	3–0 (H)	First round	(England) Ipswich Town	3–3 (a)	2–2 (A)	1–1 (H)
(France) Lyon	6–2	1–0 (H)	5–2 (A)	Second round	(Belgium) Molenbeek	3–1	2–1 (H)	1–0 (A)
(Spain) Zaragoza	9–2	5–0 (H)	4–2 (A)	Third round	(Czechoslovakia) Dukla Prague	6–3	1–3 (A)	5–0 (H)
(Czechoslovakia) Baník Ostrava	4–1	1–0 (A)	3–1 (H)	Quarter-finals	(Socialist Federal Republic of Yugoslavia) Velež Mostar	2–1	0–1 (A)	2–0 (H)
(West Germany) Köln	4–1	3–1 (A)	1–0 (H)	Semi-finals	(Italy) Juventus	4–1	3–1 (H)	1–0 (A)

== Match details ==
=== First leg ===
7 May 1975

Borussia Mönchengladbach (West Germany)	0–0	(Netherlands) Twente
	Report Overview (archive) Overview

Rheinstadion, Düsseldorf
Attendance: 42,368
Referee: Károly Palotai (Hungary)

Borussia Mönchengladbach	Twente

GK	1	(West Germany) Wolfgang Kleff
DF	2	(West Germany) Berti Vogts (c)
DF	3	(West Germany) Ulrich Surau
DF	4	(West Germany) Hans-Jürgen Wittkamp
MF	5	(West Germany) Rainer Bonhof
DF	6	(West Germany) Uli Stielike
FW	7	(Denmark) Allan Simonsen
MF	8	(West Germany) Herbert Wimmer
FW	9	(Denmark) Henning Jensen
MF	10	(West Germany) Dietmar Danner	(substituted off) 75'
MF	11	(West Germany) Christian Kulik	(substituted off) 78'
Substitutes:
FW	14	(West Germany) Karl Del'Haye	(substituted on) 75'
DF	13	(West Germany) Frank Schäffer	(substituted on) 78'
Manager:
(West Germany) Hennes Weisweiler

GK	1	(West Germany) Volkmar Groß
DF	2	(Netherlands) Kees van Ierssel
DF	3	(Netherlands) Epi Drost (c)
MF	4	(Netherlands) Jaap Bos
MF	5	(Netherlands) Frans Thijssen	(yellow card) 59'
DF	6	(Netherlands) Niels Overweg
MF	7	(Netherlands) Kick van der Vall
DF	8	(Netherlands) Kalle Oranen
FW	9	(Netherlands) Jan Jeuring		(substituted off) 86'
MF	10	(Netherlands) Theo Pahlplatz
FW	11	(Netherlands) Johan Zuidema
Substitutes:
MF	14	(Netherlands) Eddy Achterberg		(substituted on) 86'
Manager:
(Luxembourg) Antoine Kohn

=== Second leg ===
21 May 1975

Twente (Netherlands)	1–5	(West Germany) Borussia Mönchengladbach
Drost 76'	Report Overview (archive) Overview	Simonsen 2', 86' (pen.); Heynckes 9', 50', 60'

Diekman Stadion, Enschede
Attendance: 21,767
Referee: Paul Schiller (Austria)

Twente	Borussia Mönchengladbach

GK	1	(West Germany) Volkmar Groß
DF	2	(Netherlands) Kees van Ierssel
DF	3	(Netherlands) Epi Drost (c)
MF	4	(Netherlands) Jaap Bos	(substituted off) 53'
MF	5	(Netherlands) Frans Thijssen
DF	6	(Netherlands) Niels Overweg
MF	7	(Netherlands) Kick van der Vall
DF	8	(Netherlands) Kalle Oranen
FW	9	(Netherlands) Jan Jeuring
MF	10	(Netherlands) Theo Pahlplatz	(substituted off) 67'
FW	11	(Netherlands) Johan Zuidema
Substitutes:
MF	12	(Netherlands) Arnold Mühren	(substituted on) 53'
MF	14	(Netherlands) Eddy Achterberg	(substituted on) 67'
Manager:
(Luxembourg) Antoine Kohn

GK	1	(West Germany) Wolfgang Kleff
DF	2	(West Germany) Berti Vogts (c)
DF	3	(West Germany) Ulrich Surau	(substituted off) 13'
DF	4	(West Germany) Hans-Jürgen Wittkamp
MF	5	(West Germany) Rainer Bonhof
MF	6	(West Germany) Hans Klinkhammer
FW	7	(Denmark) Allan Simonsen
MF	8	(West Germany) Herbert Wimmer	(substituted off) 79'
FW	9	(Denmark) Henning Jensen
MF	10	(West Germany) Dietmar Danner
FW	11	(West Germany) Jupp Heynckes
Substitutes:
DF	13	(West Germany) Frank Schäffer	(substituted on) 13'
MF	14	(West Germany) Horst Köppel	(substituted on) 79'
Manager:
(West Germany) Hennes Weisweiler

== See also ==
- 1975 European Cup final
- 1975 European Cup Winners' Cup final
- FC Twente in European football
- 1974–75 Borussia Mönchengladbach season
