= FC Twente in European football =

FC Twente's record in UEFA club competitions

- Club: FC Twente
- Seasons played: 28
- Top scorer: Jan Jeuring (20)
- First entry: 1969–70 Inter-Cities Fairs Cup
- Latest entry: 2026–27 UEFA Conference League

FC Twente in European football includes the games which are played by FC Twente in competitions organised by UEFA.

== History ==
=== 1960s: Early Appearances ===
FC Twente made its European debut in the 1969–70 Inter-Cities Fairs Cup, following a strong domestic campaign. The club was eliminated in the first round by FC Rouen, marking the beginning of its continental journey.

=== 1970s: First European Success and UEFA Cup Finalists ===
The 1970s were FC Twente's breakthrough in European football. They reached the semi-finals of the 1972–73 UEFA Cup, where they were eliminated by Borussia Mönchengladbach. Their biggest achievement came in the 1974–75 UEFA Cup, where they advanced to the final after defeating teams like Juventus and Dukla Prague. However, in the final, they were heavily beaten by Borussia Mönchengladbach, losing 0–0 away and 1–5 at home.

=== 1980s: Inconsistent Performances ===
FC Twente participated in various European competitions throughout the decade but failed to replicate its earlier success. The club's most notable run was in the 1983–84 UEFA Cup, where they reached the third round before being knocked out by Panathinaikos.

=== 1990s: Revival and Champions League Qualification ===
During the 1990s, FC Twente had a resurgence, frequently qualifying for the UEFA Cup. Their best run came in the 1997–98 UEFA Cup, reaching the third round. In 1998–99, Twente qualified for the UEFA Champions League qualifying rounds but were eliminated by FK Partizan, missing out on the group stage.

=== 2000s: Strong UEFA Cup Campaigns ===
FC Twente became a regular in the UEFA Cup, advancing to the Round of 16 in 2006–07, where they lost to Getafe. Their consistent domestic performances ensured European qualification almost every season.

=== 2010s: Champions League Group Stage and Europa League Runs ===
This decade marked Twente’s greatest European success. After winning the 2009–10 Eredivisie, they qualified for the 2010–11 UEFA Champions League group stage, finishing third in a group with Inter Milan, Tottenham Hotspur, and Werder Bremen, which sent them to the Europa League knockouts. They reached the quarter-finals of the 2010–11 Europa League, where they were eliminated by Villarreal. FC Twente continued participating in European competitions but struggled to advance beyond the group stages.

=== 2020s: Return to European Competition ===
After a period of absence, Twente returned to European football in the 2022–23 UEFA Europa Conference League. They reached the playoff round but were eliminated by Fiorentina, narrowly missing out on the group stage.

== Overall record ==
(Note: Intertoto Cup was founded first in 1961–62, but was only taken over by UEFA in 1995. Therefore the results of Intertoto Cup before the year 1995 are excluded from the statistics.)

As of 5 November 2026

Competition	Entries	Pld	W	D	L	GF	GA
UEFA Europa Conference League	3	17	10	3	4	37	18
UEFA Champions League	5	16	2	8	6	19	28
UEFA Europa League/UEFA Cup	21	118	48	28	42	182	161
UEFA Cup Winners' Cup	1	8	5	1	2	14	4
UEFA Intertoto Cup	2	8	2	3	3	9	9
Inter-Cities Fairs Cup	2	10	5	2	3	18	12
Total	34	177	72	45	60	279	232

== Top scorers ==
(Note: Intertoto Cup was founded first in 1961–62, but was only taken over by UEFA in 1995. Therefore the results of Intertoto Cup before the year 1995 are excluded from the statistics.)

As of 6 August 2026

Rank	Goals	Player	Date of last goal	Competition
1	19	(Netherlands) Jan Jeuring	9 April 1975	1974–75 UEFA Cup
2	12	(Netherlands) Johan Zuidema	23 April 1975	1974–75 UEFA Cup
3	11	(Belgium) Nacer Chadli	20 September 2012	2012–13 UEFA Europa League
3	11	(Netherlands) Theo Pahlplatz	18 September 1974	1974–75 UEFA Cup
5	10	(Netherlands) Luuk de Jong	8 March 2012	2011–12 UEFA Europa League
6	8	(Netherlands) Kick van der Vall	27 September 1978	1978–79 UEFA Cup
7	7	(Netherlands) Ab Gritter	27 September 1978	1978–79 UEFA Cup
7	7	(Netherlands) Leroy Fer	30 August 2012	2012–13 UEFA Europa League
9	5	(Netherlands) Daan Rots	6 August 2026	2026–27 UEFA Conference League
9	5	(Austria) Marc Janko	1 December 2011	2011–12 UEFA Europa League
9	5	(Netherlands) René Notten	11 December 1974	1974–75 UEFA Cup
9	5	(Netherlands) René van de Kerkhof	8 November 1972	1972–73 UEFA Cup
9	5	(Netherlands) Sem Steijn	20 February 2025	2024–25 UEFA Europa League

== Record by country ==
(Note: Intertoto Cup was founded first in 1961–62, but was only taken over by UEFA in 1995. Therefore the results of Intertoto Cup before the year 1995 are excluded from the statistics.)

As of 5 November 2026

Rank	Country	Pld	W	D	L	GF	GA	Clubs (matches)
1	Germany	19	4	7	8	18	32	Bayer Leverkusen (2), Bayern Munich (2), Borussia Mönchengladbach (4), Dynamo Dresden (2), Hannover 96 (2), Schalke 04 (3), Werder Bremen (4)
2	England	14	1	6	7	16	28	Arsenal (2), Fulham (2), Ipswich Town (4), Manchester City (3), Manchester United F.C. (1), Tottenham Hotspur (2)
3	France	10	3	1	6	6	14	Auxerre (2), OGC Nice (1), Marseille (2), Paris Saint-Germain (1), Rennes (2), Rouen (2)
3	Turkey	10	4	1	5	18	17	Beşiktaş (1), Bursaspor (2), Eskişehirspor (2), Fenerbahçe (5)
5	Italy	9	2	3	4	9	12	Fiorentina (2), Inter Milan (2), Juventus (4), SS Lazio (1)
5	Spain	9	3	1	5	10	16	Getafe (2), Las Palmas (2), Levante (2), Racing Santander (1), Villarreal (2)
5	Sweden	9	4	2	3	16	13	Hammarby IF (2), Helsingborgs IF (2), IFK Göteborg (2), Kalmar FF (2), Malmö FF (1)
8	Denmark	8	6	2	0	24	4	AGF (2), BK Frem (2), OB (2), Vejle (2)
8	Norway	8	5	1	2	12	9	FK Bodø/Glimt (2), Brann (2), Kongsvinger (2), Lillestrøm (2)
10	Belgium	7	2	1	4	4	9	Anderlecht (2), Club Brugge (2), Molenbeek (2), Union Saint-Gilloise (1)
10	Greece	7	4	2	1	15	6	AEK Athens (2), Olympiacos F.C. (1), Panachaiki (2), Panionios (2)
12	Azerbaijan	6	2	3	1	8	4	Qarabağ (6)
12	Romania	6	3	3	0	5	1	Steaua București (4), Vaslui (2)
14	Austria	4	0	2	2	7	10	Red Bull Salzburg (4)
14	Czech Republic	4	3	0	1	10	3	Dukla Prague (2), Mladá Boleslav (2)
14	Hungary	4	1	1	2	7	9	Kispest Honvéd (2), Ferencvárosi TC (2)
14	Poland	4	3	0	1	9	4	Polonia Warsaw (2), Wisła Kraków (2)
14	Portugal	4	0	3	1	4	6	Benfica (2), Sporting CP (2)
14	Russia	4	2	1	1	7	4	Rubin Kazan (2), Zenit Saint Petersburg (2)
14	Scotland	4	3	1	0	10	3	Dundee United (2), Rangers (2)
14	Serbia	4	3	0	1	11	5	Čukarički (2), OFK Beograd (2)
22	Switzerland	3	2	0	1	5	6	FC Thun (1), Grasshopper (2)
23	Andorra	2	2	0	0	9	0	UE Santa Coloma (2)
23	Bosnia and Herzegovina	2	1	0	1	2	1	Velež Mostar (2)
23	Croatia	2	1	1	0	3	2	Dinamo Zagreb (2)
23	Estonia	2	0	1	1	1	2	FCI Levadia (2)
23	Finland	2	1	1	0	6	1	Inter Turku (2)
23	(Georgia (country)) Georgia	2	1	0	1	4	3	Dinamo Tbilisi (2)
23	Latvia	2	2	0	0	5	0	Riga (2)
23	Moldova	2	1	0	1	2	3	Sheriff Tiraspol (2)
23	Slovakia	2	1	1	0	9	3	FC DAC 1904 Dunajská Streda (2)
32	Cyprus	1	1	0	0	3	1	Pafos FC (1)
32	Gibraltar	1	1	0	0	4	1	Lincoln Red Imps F.C. (1)

== Most played clubs ==
As of 27 August 2026

Rank	Club	Pld	W	D	L	GF	GA
1	(Azerbaijan) Qarabağ	6	2	3	1	8	4
2	(Turkey) Fenerbahçe	5	1	1	3	4	9
3	(Germany) Borussia Mönchengladbach	4	0	1	3	2	10
3	(Romania) Steaua București	4	2	2	0	3	1
3	(England) Ipswich Town	4	0	2	2	4	6
3	(Italy) Juventus	4	2	1	1	6	5
3	(Austria) Red Bull Salzburg	4	0	2	2	7	10
3	(Germany) Werder Bremen	4	2	1	1	5	5
9	(England) Manchester City	3	0	1	2	5	7
9	(Germany) Schalke 04	3	2	0	1	4	5

== European match history ==
As of 5 November 2026

Competition	Round	Opponent	Home	Away	Aggregate
1969–70 Inter-Cities Fairs Cup	First round	(France) Rouen	1–0	0–2	1–2
1970–71 Inter-Cities Fairs Cup	First round	(Greece) AEK Athens	3–0	1–0	4–0
1970–71 Inter-Cities Fairs Cup	Second round	(Turkey) Eskişehirspor	6–1	2–3	8–4
1970–71 Inter-Cities Fairs Cup	Third round	(Socialist Federal Republic of Yugoslavia) Dinamo Zagreb	1–0	2–2	3–2
1970–71 Inter-Cities Fairs Cup	Quarter-finals	(Italy) Juventus	2–2	0–2	2–4
1972–73 UEFA Cup	First round	(Soviet Union) Dinamo Tbilisi	2–0	2–3	4–3
1972–73 UEFA Cup	Second round	(Denmark) BK Frem	4–0	5–0	9–0
1972–73 UEFA Cup	Third round	(Spain) Las Palmas	3–0	1–2	4–2
1972–73 UEFA Cup	Quarter-finals	(Socialist Federal Republic of Yugoslavia) OFK Beograd	2–0	2–3	4–3
1972–73 UEFA Cup	Semi-finals	(West Germany) Borussia Mönchengladbach	1–2	0–3	1–5
1973–74 UEFA Cup	First round	(Scotland) Dundee	4–2	3–1	7–3
1973–74 UEFA Cup	Second round	(Greece) Panachaiki	7–0	1–1	8–1
1973–74 UEFA Cup	Third round	(England) Ipswich Town	1–2	0–1	1–3
1974–75 UEFA Cup	First round	(England) Ipswich Town	1–1	2–2	3–3 (a)
1974–75 UEFA Cup	Second round	(Belgium) Molenbeek	2–1	1–0	3–1
1974–75 UEFA Cup	Third round	(Czechoslovakia) Dukla Prague	5–0	1–3	6–3
1974–75 UEFA Cup	Quarter-finals	(Socialist Federal Republic of Yugoslavia) Velež Mostar	2–0	0–1	2–1
1974–75 UEFA Cup	Semi-finals	(Italy) Juventus	3–1	1–0	4–1
1974–75 UEFA Cup	Final	(West Germany) Borussia Mönchengladbach	1–5	0–0	1–5
1977–78 European Cup Winners' Cup	First round	(Scotland) Rangers	3–0	0–0	3–0
1977–78 European Cup Winners' Cup	Second round	(Norway) Brann	2–0	2–1	4–1
1977–78 European Cup Winners' Cup	Quarter-finals	(Denmark) Vejle	4–0	3–0	7–0
1977–78 European Cup Winners' Cup	Semi-finals	(Belgium) Anderlecht	0–1	0–2	0–3
1978–79 UEFA Cup	First round	(England) Manchester City	1–1	2–3	3–4
1979–80 European Cup Winners' Cup	First round	(Greece) Panionios	3–1	0–4	3–5
1980–81 UEFA Cup	First round	(Sweden) IFK Göteborg	5–1	0–2	5–3
1980–81 UEFA Cup	Second Round	(East Germany) Dynamo Dresden	1–1	0–0	1–1 (a)
1989–90 UEFA Cup	First Round	(Belgium) Club Brugge	0–0	1–4	1–4
1990–91 UEFA Cup	First Round	(West Germany) Bayer Leverkusen	1–1 (a.e.t.)	0–1	1–2
1993–94 UEFA Cup	First round	(Germany) Bayern Munich	3–4	0–3	3–7
1994–95 UEFA Cup	First round	(Hungary) Kispest Honvéd	1–4	3–1	4–5
1997–98 UEFA Cup	First round	(Norway) Lillestrøm	0–1	2–1	2–2 (a)
1997–98 UEFA Cup	Second round	(Denmark) AGF	0–0	1–1	1–1 (a)
1997–98 UEFA Cup	Third round	(France) Auxerre	0–1	0–2	0–3
1998 UEFA Intertoto Cup	Second round	(Norway) Kongsvinger	2–0	0–0	2–0
1998 UEFA Intertoto Cup	Third round	Austria Salzburg	2–2	1–3	3–5
2001–02 UEFA Cup	First round	(Poland) Polonia Warsaw	2–0	2–1	4–1
2001–02 UEFA Cup	Second round	(Switzerland) Grasshopper	3–2	1–4	4–6
2006 UEFA Intertoto Cup (Note: The 2006 UEFA Intertoto Cup was the first edition after a major change of the competition format. There were only three rounds instead of five, and eleven tournament co-winners qualified for the second qualifying round of the UEFA Cup.)	Third round	(Sweden) Kalmar FF	3–1	0–1	3–2
2006–07 UEFA Cup	Second qualifying round	(Estonia) FCI Levadia	1–1	0–1	1–2
2007–08 UEFA Cup	First round	(Spain) Getafe	3–2	0–1	3–3 (a)
2008–09 UEFA Champions League	Third qualifying round	(England) Arsenal	0–2	0–4	0–6
2008–09 UEFA Cup	First round	(France) Rennes	1–0	1–2	2–2 (a)
2008–09 UEFA Cup	Group stage	(Spain) Racing Santander	1–0	—N/a	2nd
2008–09 UEFA Cup	Group stage	(England) Manchester City	—N/a	2–3	2nd
2008–09 UEFA Cup	Group stage	(Germany) Schalke 04	2–1	—N/a	2nd
2008–09 UEFA Cup	Group stage	(France) Paris Saint-Germain	—N/a	0–4	2nd
2008–09 UEFA Cup	Round of 32	(France) Marseille	0–1	1–0	1–1 (6–7 p)
2009–10 UEFA Champions League	Third qualifying round	(Portugal) Sporting CP	1–1	0–0	1–1 (a)
2009–10 UEFA Europa League	Play-off round	(Azerbaijan) Qarabağ	3–1	0–0	3–1
2009–10 UEFA Europa League	Group stage	(Turkey) Fenerbahçe	0–1	2–1	2nd
2009–10 UEFA Europa League	Group stage	(Romania) Steaua București	0–0	1–1	2nd
2009–10 UEFA Europa League	Group stage	(Moldova) Sheriff Tiraspol	2–1	0–2	2nd
2009–10 UEFA Europa League	Round of 32	(Germany) Werder Bremen	1–0	1–4	2–4
2010–11 UEFA Champions League	Group stage	(Italy) Inter Milan	2–2	0–1	3rd
2010–11 UEFA Champions League	Group stage	(England) Tottenham Hotspur	3–3	1–4	3rd
2010–11 UEFA Champions League	Group stage	(Germany) Werder Bremen	1–1	2–0	3rd
2010–11 UEFA Europa League	Round of 32	(Russia) Rubin Kazan	2–2	2–0	4–2
2010–11 UEFA Europa League	Round of 16	(Russia) Zenit Saint Petersburg	3–0	0–2	3–2
2010–11 UEFA Europa League	Quarter-finals	(Spain) Villarreal	1–3	1–5	2–8
2011–12 UEFA Champions League	Third qualifying round	(Romania) Vaslui	2–0	0–0	2–0
2011–12 UEFA Champions League	Play-off round	(Portugal) Benfica	2–2	1–3	3–5
2011–12 UEFA Europa League	Group stage	(England) Fulham	1–0	1–1	1st
2011–12 UEFA Europa League	Group stage	(Poland) Wisła Kraków	4–1	1–2	1st
2011–12 UEFA Europa League	Group stage	(Denmark) OB	3–2	4–1	1st
2011–12 UEFA Europa League	Round of 32	(Romania) Steaua București	1–0	1–0	2–0
2011–12 UEFA Europa League	Round of 16	(Germany) Schalke 04	1–0	1–4	2–4
2012–13 UEFA Europa League	First qualifying round	(Andorra) UE Santa Coloma	6–0	3–0	9–0
2012–13 UEFA Europa League	Second qualifying round	(Finland) Inter Turku	1–1	5–0	6–1
2012–13 UEFA Europa League	Third qualifying round	(Czech Republic) Mladá Boleslav	2–0	2–0	4–0
2012–13 UEFA Europa League	Play-off round	(Turkey) Bursaspor	4–1 (a.e.t.)	1–3	5–4
2012–13 UEFA Europa League	Group stage	(Germany) Hannover 96	2–2	0–0	4th
2012–13 UEFA Europa League	Group stage	(Sweden) Helsingborgs IF	1–3	2–2	4th
2012–13 UEFA Europa League	Group stage	(Spain) Levante	0–0	0–3	4th
2014–15 UEFA Europa League	Play-off round	(Azerbaijan) Qarabağ	1–1	0–0	1–1 (a)
2022–23 UEFA Europa Conference League	Third qualifying round	(Serbia) Čukarički	4–1	3–1	7–2
2022–23 UEFA Europa Conference League	Play-off round	(Italy) Fiorentina	0–0	1–2	1–2
2024–25 UEFA Champions League	Third qualifying round	(Austria) Red Bull Salzburg	3–3	1–2	4–5
2024–25 UEFA Europa League	League phase	(England) Manchester United	—N/a	1–1	23rd
2024–25 UEFA Europa League	League phase	(Turkey) Fenerbahçe	1–1	—N/a	23rd
2024–25 UEFA Europa League	League phase	(Italy) Lazio	0–2	—N/a	23rd
2024–25 UEFA Europa League	League phase	(France) Nice	—N/a	2–2	23rd
2024–25 UEFA Europa League	League phase	(Belgium) Union Saint-Gilloise	0–1	—N/a	23rd
2024–25 UEFA Europa League	League phase	(Greece) Olympiacos	—N/a	0–0	23rd
2024–25 UEFA Europa League	League phase	(Sweden) Malmö FF	—N/a	3–2	23rd
2024–25 UEFA Europa League	League phase	(Turkey) Beşiktaş	1–0	—N/a	23rd
2024–25 UEFA Europa League	Knockout phase play-offs	(Norway) Bodø/Glimt	2–1	2–5 (a.e.t.)	4–6
2026–27 UEFA Europa League	Second qualifying round	(Hungary) Ferencváros	1–2	2–2	3–4
2026–27 UEFA Conference League	Third qualifying round	(Slovakia) FC DAC 1904 Dunajská Streda	6–0	3–3	9–3
2026–27 UEFA Conference League	Play-off round	(Azerbaijan) Qarabağ FK	0–1	4–1 (a.e.t.)	4–2
2026–27 UEFA Conference League	League phase	(Switzerland) FC Thun	2–1	—N/a	
2026–27 UEFA Conference League	League phase	(Gibraltar) Lincoln Red Imps F.C.	—N/a	4–1	
2026–27 UEFA Conference League	League phase	(Cyprus) Pafos FC	3–1	—N/a	
2026–27 UEFA Conference League	League phase	(Germany) SC Freiburg	—N/a		
2026–27 UEFA Conference League	League phase	(Denmark) Aarhus Gymnastikforening	—N/a		
2026–27 UEFA Conference League	League phase	(Kazakhstan) FC Kairat		—N/a	
UEFA club coefficient: 13,500 (118th)

== Intertoto Cup history ==
(Note: The tournament was founded in 1961–62, but was only taken over by UEFA in 1995. Therefore the results of Intertoto Cup before the year 1995 are excluded from the statistics.)

Competition	Round	Opponent	Home	Away	Aggregate
1970 Intertoto Cup	Group stage	(Sweden) Djurgårdens IF	4–1	2–2	2nd
1970 Intertoto Cup	Group stage	(West Germany) Hannover 96	1–1	2–2	2nd
1970 Intertoto Cup	Group stage	(Czech Republic) Union Teplice	2–0	6–2	2nd
1977 Intertoto Cup	Group stage	(Israel) Maccabi Tel Aviv	3–4	3–1	3rd
1977 Intertoto Cup	Group stage	(Belgium) Standard Liège	3–2	1–2	3rd
1977 Intertoto Cup	Group stage	(West Germany) MSV Duisburg	0–2	3–2	3rd
1983 Intertoto Cup	Group stage	(Switzerland) Zürich	1–1	4–3	1st
1983 Intertoto Cup	Group stage	(West Germany) Fortuna Düsseldorf	1–0	4–2	1st
1983 Intertoto Cup	Group stage	(Belgium) Standard Liège	2–0	2–4	1st
1985 Intertoto Cup	Group stage	(Belgium) Standard Liège	1–1	0–1	4th
1985 Intertoto Cup	Group stage	(West Germany) Fortuna Düsseldorf	0–0	2–4	4th
1985 Intertoto Cup	Group stage	(East Germany) Rot-Weiß Erfurt	1–0	0–4	4th
