= Antoine Kohn =

Luxembourgish footballer and manager (1933–2012)

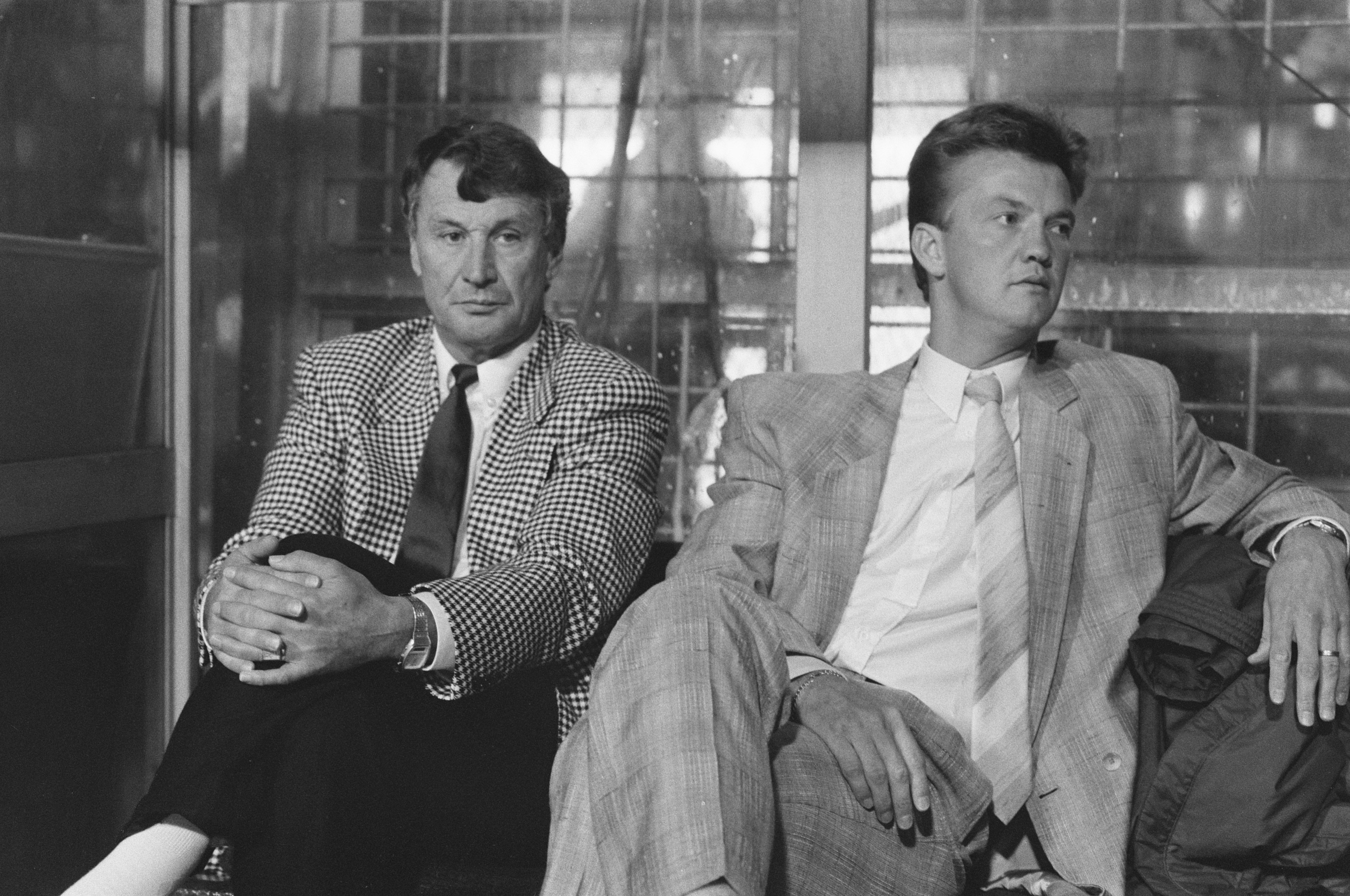
- Kohn (left) with Louis Van Gaal at AFC Ajax in 1988.

Personal information
- Date of birth: 1 November 1933
- Place of birth: Luxembourg City, Luxembourg
- Date of death: 24 November 2012 (aged 79)
- Position: Forward

Senior career*
Years	Team	Apps	(Gls)
1949–1954	Jeunesse Esch		
1954–1958	Karlsruher SC	66	(32)
1958–1959	FC Basel	23	(11)
1959–1963	Fortuna '54	119	(62)
1963–1964	Sportclub Enschede	17	(12)
1964–1965	Fortuna '54	28	(19)
1965–1968	FC Twente	29	(11)

International career
1953–1965	Luxembourg	7	(1)

Managerial career
- 1972–1979: FC Twente
- 1980–1981: Go Ahead Eagles
- 1981: Club Brugge
- 1982–1983: FC Twente
- 1985: Ajax (caretaker and Dutch champions)
- 1988: Ajax (caretaker)
- 1988–1989: Ajax (caretaker)
- * Club domestic league appearances and goals

Antoine "Spitz" Kohn (1 November 1933 – 24 November 2012) was a Luxembourgish football player and football manager.

== Club career ==
Kohn played as a forward, and spent most of his career plying his trade abroad, in Germany, Switzerland, and finally Netherlands, where he later became a successful manager. During his playing days, he earned the nickname "Spitz" for his ferocity and goal-scoring instinct.

== International career ==
Kohn made his debut for Luxembourg in a September 1953 World Cup qualification match against France, in which he immediately scored a goal. He went on to earn 7 caps, scoring one goal, all of them in FIFA World Cup qualification matches. He won a total of 16 caps (6 goals) including unofficial matches.

He played his final international game in September 1965, a 5–2 defeat by Yugoslavia.

== Managerial career ==
After retiring as a player, Kohn became manager at FC Twente in July 1972 and clinched runner-up spot in the 1973–74 season, in the 1972–73 season FC Twente finished third in the Dutch competition, in the 1974–75, 1975–76 and 1977–78 seasons, FC Twente finished as fourth club in the Dutch competition. In May 1975 they reached the UEFA Cup Final, losing 5–1 on aggregate to German side Borussia Mönchengladbach. The Dutch Cup was won in the 1976–77 season (FC Twente – PEC Zwolle 3–0), in the 1978–79 season the Cup final was lost (Ajax – FC Twente 1–1, 3–0).

Kohn moved on to Go Ahead Eagles in 1980 and Club Brugge in 1981 before rejoining Twente in the 1982–83 season, but he could not save them from relegation that year. Between June 1984 and June 1990 he was assistant coach at Ajax. After the firing of coach Aad de Mos, Kohn was the responsible manager, the last five rounds of the 1984–85 season, coaching Ajax to the Dutch championship, with players like Hans Galjé, Stanley Menzo, Sonny Silooy, Frank Rijkaard, Ronald Koeman, Gerald Vanenburg, Marco van Basten, Rob de Wit, John van 't Schip and John Bosman. After five rounds in the 1988–89 season Kohn became the responsible manager at Ajax, his assistant being Louis van Gaal.

He finished his career as a scout for Udinese and SC Heerenveen.

== Career statistics ==
Scores and results list Luxembourg's goal tally first.

#	Date	Venue	Opponent	Score	Result	Competition
1	20 September 1953	Stade Josy Barthel, Luxembourg, Luxembourg	France	1–1	1–6	1954 World Cup qualifying

== Honours ==
=== Player ===
- Luxembourg National Division: 1951, 1954
- Luxembourg Cup: 1954
- German Cup: 1955, 1956
