= Oranen =

Oranen is a surname. Notable people with the surname include:

- Esko Oranen (1868–1951), Finnish farmer and politician
- Kalle Oranen (1946–2023), Dutch footballer
