= Jan Jeuring =

Dutch footballer

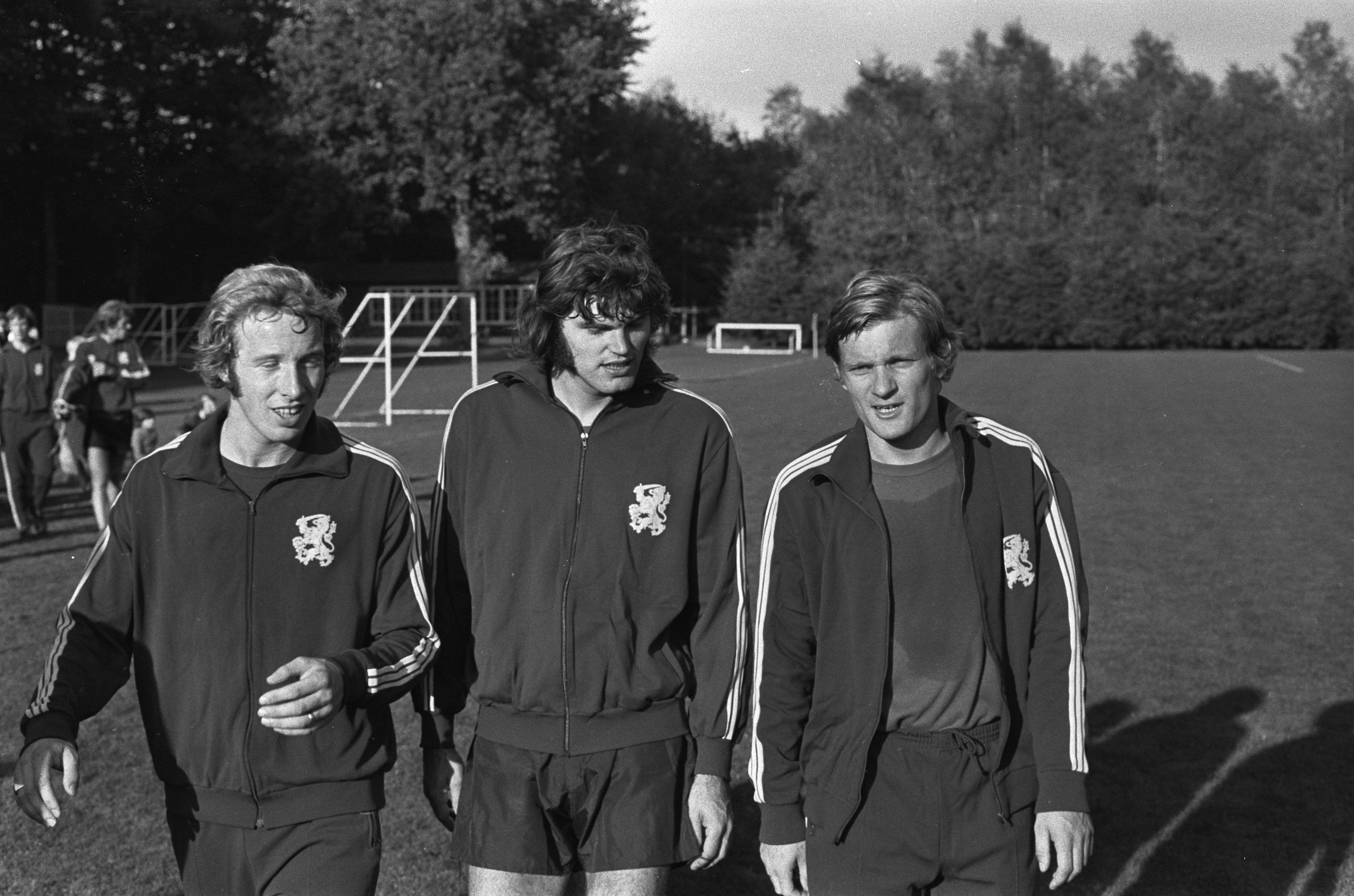
- Jan Jeuring (left) with Barry Hulshoff and Hans Venneker in 1971

Personal information
- Full name: Jan Jeuring
- Date of birth: 27 November 1947 (age 78)
- Place of birth: Enschede, Netherlands
- Height: 1.80 m (5 ft 11 in)
- Position: Forward

Senior career*
Years	Team	Apps	(Gls)
1966–1977	FC Twente	326	(103)

International career
1971–1973	Netherlands	2	(0)
- * Club domestic league appearances and goals

Jan Jeuring (born 27 November 1947) is a Dutch former professional football player. He played his entire career in the Eredivisie for FC Twente.

== Career ==
Jeuring finished second in the league with FC Twente in 1973–74 season, two points behind Feyenoord. Then, he reached the UEFA Cup final in 1974–75 but lost to Borussia Mönchengladbach. Later on, he won the KNVB Cup in 1976–77. He played 326 matches in all competitions scoring 103 goals.

== Honours ==
FC Twente

- KNVB Cup: 1976–77; runners-up: 1974–75
- UEFA Cup runners-up: 1974–75

Individual

- UEFA Cup Top Scorer: 1972–73
- Top scorer for FC Twente in Eredivisie: 1966–67, 1970–71, 1972–73, 1975–76
