= Kalle Oranen =

Dutch footballer (1946–2023)

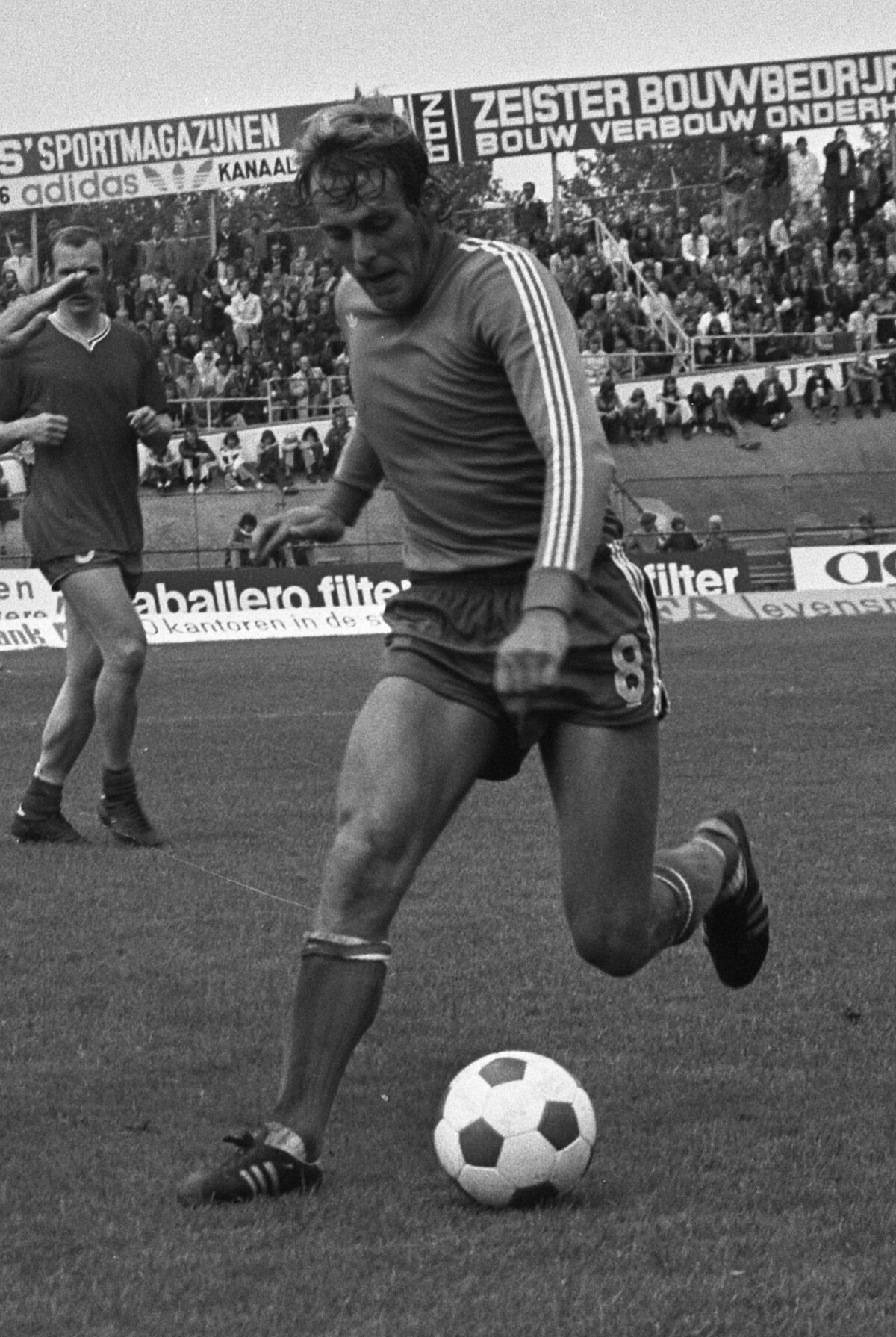
Kalle Oranen (1974)

Seppo Kalevi "Kalle" Oranen (26 February 1946 – 17 October 2023) was a Dutch footballer who played as a left-back for Sportclub Enschede, FC Twente and SC Heracles.

Oranen was the son of a Finnish father and Dutch mother. He had Finnish citizenship before he acquired Dutch citizenship. Oranen played football in the youth of Sportclub Enschede and at the age of eighteen made his debut for the club in the Eredivisie. From 1965 Oranen was part of the selection of FC Twente, the club where SC Enschede had risen. He was originally a forward, but was later deployed mainly as left-back. Only from the 1970–71 season he acquired a permanent basis. In the season 1971–72 he formed with Kees van Ierssel, Epi Drost, Willem de Vries and goalkeeper Piet Schrijvers the starting lineup in the FC Twente defense, which allowed only thirteen goals, a record low for an Eredivisie season.

With Oranen Twente played 28 European Cup matches, including the finals of the UEFA Cup in 1975. In the league, he scored three goals in 207 matches for the Enschede. In 1977, he won the Twente KNVB Cup, although he only came once to play in that tournament.

In the summer of 1977 he moved to SC Heracles. For the Almelo club he played five seasons. Meanwhile, he studied at the Academy of Physical Education in The Hague and he was employed as a teacher at an elementary school. In 1982, he finished his pro career. After this he was sports teacher at the University of Twente and was coach of its student football team VV Drienerlo. He retired in August 2008.

Oranen died on 17 October 2023, at the age of 77.
