= Kees van Ierssel =

Dutch footballer (born 1945)

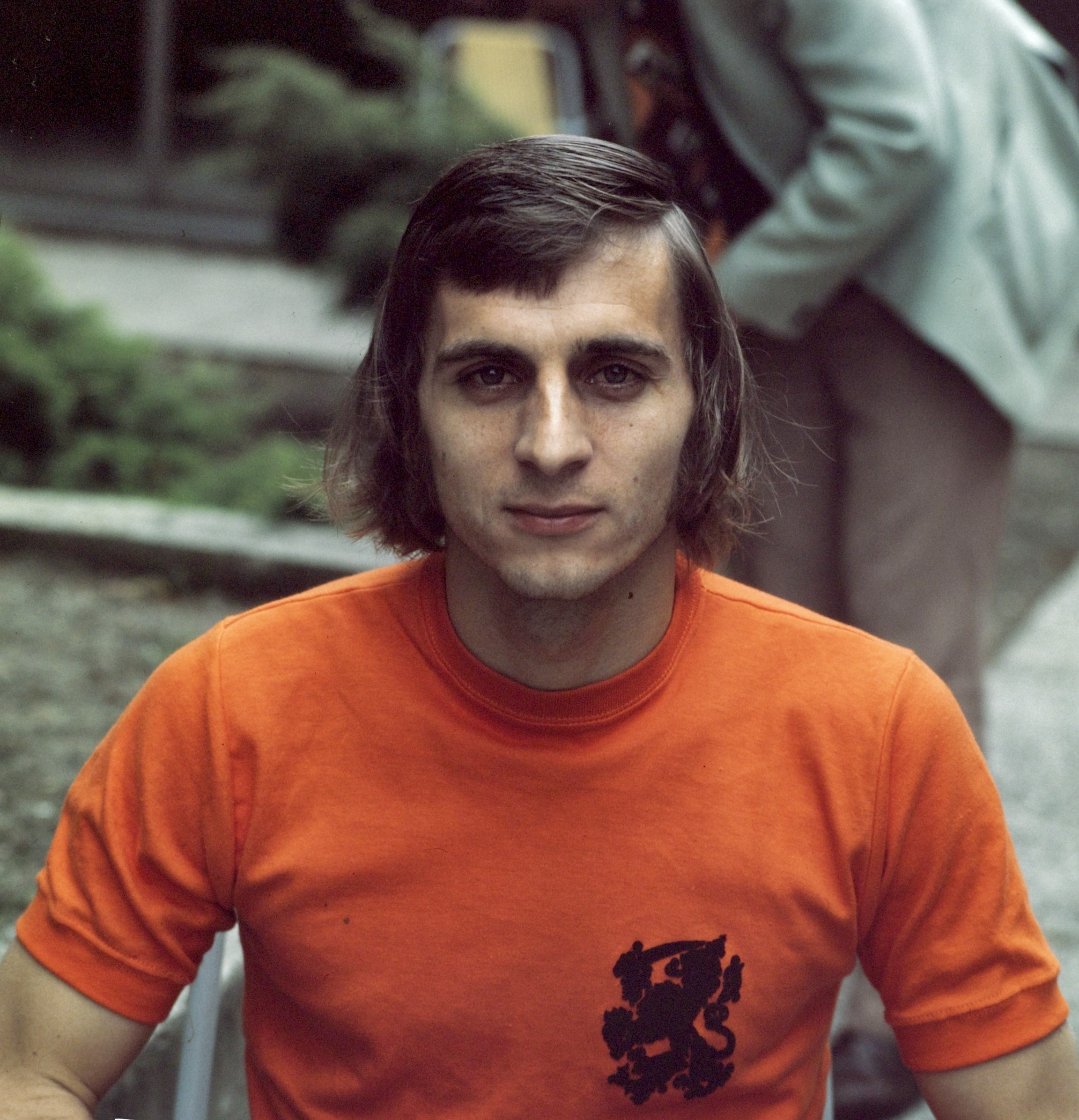
- Van Ierssel in 1974

Personal information
- Full name: Cornelius Claudius Henricus van Ierssel
- Date of birth: 6 December 1945 (age 80)
- Place of birth: Breda, Netherlands
- Position: Right-back

Senior career*
Years	Team	Apps	(Gls)
1962–1969	Baronie	211	(39)
1969–1979	Twente	313	(14)
1979–1982	Heracles	82	(6)
Total		606	(59)

International career
1963–1964	Netherlands U19	8	(0)
1973–1974	Netherlands	6	(0)
Medal record
Men's football
Representing Netherlands
FIFA World Cup
Runner-up	1974 West Germany
- * Club domestic league appearances and goals

Cornelius Claudius Henricus "Kees" van Ierssel (Dutch pronunciation: [kɔrˈneːlijəs ˈklʌudijəs ɦɛnˈrikʏs ˈkeːs fɑn ˈiːrsəl]; (Note: In isolation, van is pronounced [vɑn].) born 6 December 1945) is a Dutch retired footballer who played as a right-back.

== Career ==
Born in Breda, van Ierssel played for local club Baronie and scored the fastest goal in the history of professional football in the 1967-68 season against De Graafschap after 7 seconds. He played at Baronie alongside Nico Rijnders and Gerrie Deijkers, who ended up with Ajax and PSV respectively.

He left his hometown to play for FC Twente from 1969 to 1979. After being deemed surplus to requirements, he left them for local rivals Heracles. After retiring, van Ierssel stayed to live in Twenthe, in Oldenzaal.

He earned six caps for the Netherlands national team, and was part of the squad that finished as runners-up in the 1974 FIFA World Cup.

== Career statistics ==
=== International ===
Appearances and goals by national team and year
National team	Year	Apps	Goals
Netherlands	1973	1	0
Netherlands	1974	5	0
Total		6	0

== Honours ==
FC Twente

- Eredivisie runner-up: 1973-74
- KNVB Cup: winner 1976-77, runner-up 1974-75, 1978-79

Netherlands

- FIFA World Cup runner-up: 1974
