= Overweg =

Overweg is a Dutch and German topographic surname, derived from the Dutch word/surname overweg, meaning "over road/way". It was used during the Middle Ages as a hereditary surname for someone who lived near a bridge, ford, overpass or crossroads. It is also related to the surnames Van der Weg and Uit de Weg.

The name was quite common in the Netherlands and Germany, as it was associated with the occupation of bridge or road maintenance, which was an important part of road or bridge engineering at the time. The name thus came to symbolise those who either oversaw or fixed the roads, bridges, and other transport networks.

During the 18th century, the name Overweg had already reached the Germanic regions of the Netherlands, Switzerland, and Germany. It was also established in various parts of Prussia and Austria in later centuries, before spreading to other territories.

The surname Overweg can be found in various parts of Europe, but it is most common in Dutch, German, Swiss, and Polish regions. It is also used as a patronymic surname to refer to the descendants of the original bearer of the surname.

Notable people with the surname include:

- Adolf Overweg (1822–1852), German geologist, astronomer, and traveler
- Marty Overweg, American politician and businessman
- Niels Overweg (born 1948), Dutch footballer and manager
