= Epi Drost =

Dutch footballer (1945–1995)

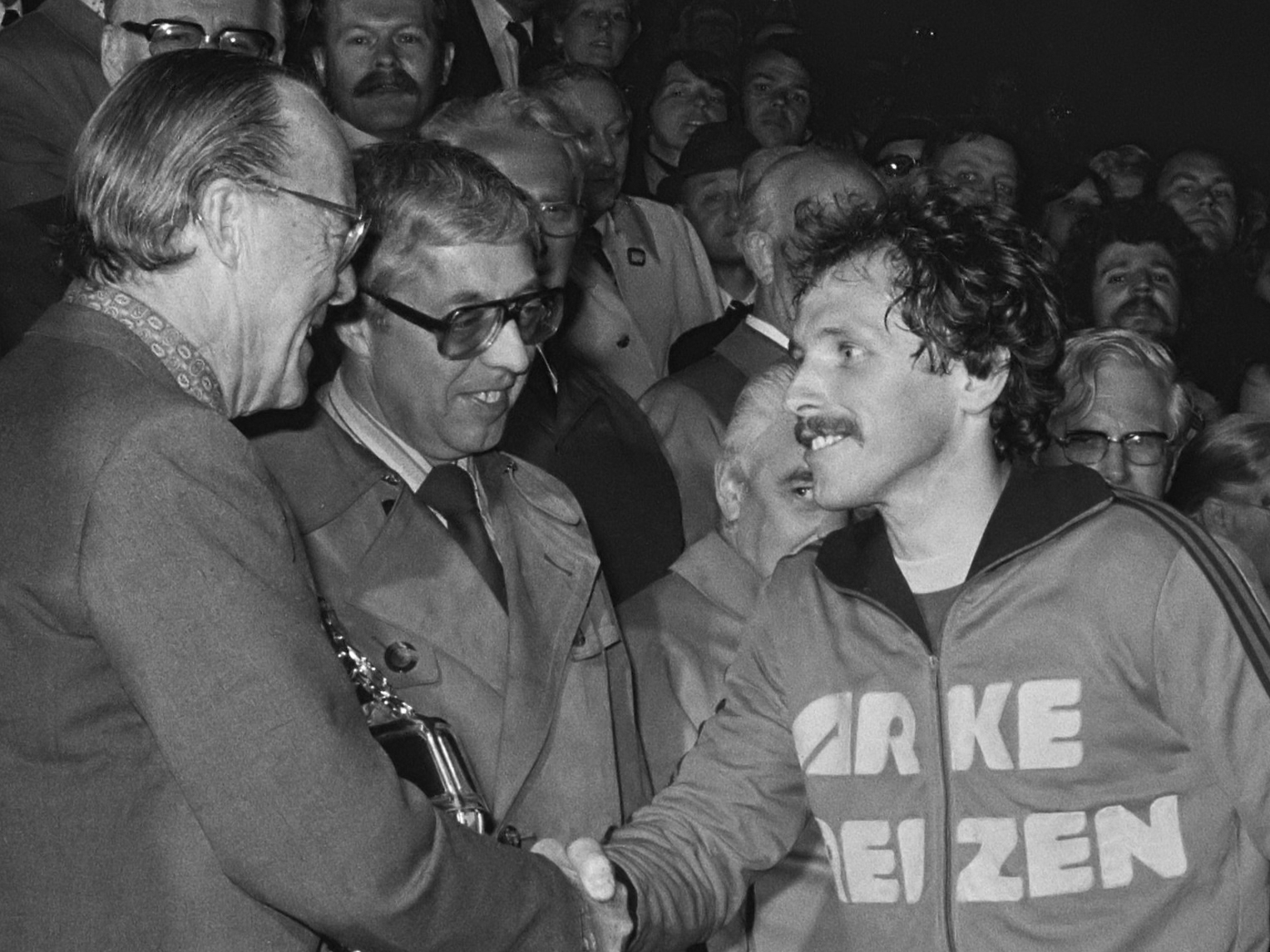
- Drost, receiving the 1977 KNVB Cup

Personal information
- Full name: Eimert Drost
- Date of birth: 21 September 1945
- Place of birth: Amersfoort, Netherlands
- Date of death: 27 May 1995 (aged 49)
- Place of death: Rotterdam, Netherlands
- Position: Sweeper

Youth career
- FC Wageningen

Senior career*
Years	Team	Apps	(Gls)
1962–1965	FC Wageningen	80	(41)
1965–1966	Heracles	19	(0)
1966–1980	FC Twente	415	(8)
1980–1982	DS'79	52	(0)
1982–1983	FC Twente	8	(0)
Total		574	(49)

International career
1969–1973	Netherlands	9	(0)

Managerial career
- 1987–1989: RBC
- 1983–1984: DS'79
- 1990–1995: STEVO
- * Club domestic league appearances and goals

Eimert "Epi" Drost (21 September 1945 – 27 May 1995) was a Dutch association football player and manager, best known for his time with FC Twente.

== Club career ==
Drost was born in Amersfoort. A sweeper, made his senior debut for FC Wageningen on 23 September 1962 against De Graafschap, then had a short spell with Heracles Almelo, before joining manager Kees Rijvers at FC Twente where he would become one of the best players in the history of the club. Known for his colourful lifestyle and fierce shot, he played 423 league games for the club, only to be surpassed by Sander Boschker in 2006. During his time at the club, Twente would finish second (behind Feyenoord) in 1974 and third in 1969 in the Eredivisie and would reach the 1975 UEFA Cup Final. His only trophy would be the 1977 KNVB Cup, he scored Twente's first goal in the final with a 30-yard piledriver.

He later played for DS '79, where he was joined by long-time Twente colleague Niels Overweg, before returning to Twente for a final season in which he was injured and could not save the club from relegation.

== International career ==
Drost made his debut for the Netherlands in an April 1969 friendly match against Switzerland and earned a total of nine caps, scoring no goals. His final international was a September 1973 FIFA World Cup qualification match against Norway.

== Managerial career ==
Drost coached RBC Roosendaal, DS '79 and Hoofdklasse club STEVO, with whom he won the Dutch Sunday-amateur football title in 1994.

== Personal life and death ==
Drost was a son of former HVC and Wageningen player Selis Drost.

Drost died in May 1995 of a heart attack during a game with Holland's former internationals players in Rotterdam. He was chosen Twente's player of the century by the club's supporters in 2000 and in 2009, a statue of Mister Twente Epi Drost was erected in FC Twente's stadium.
