= 1974–75 Eerste Divisie =

19th season of the second-tier football league in Netherlands

Eerste Divisie
- Season: 1974–75
- Champions: NEC Nijmegen
- Promoted: NEC Nijmegen; FC Eindhoven
- Goals: 871
- Average goals/game: 2.54

The Dutch Eerste Divisie in the 1974–75 season was contested by 19 teams, one team less than in the previous year. This was due to the absorption of Volewijckers by eredivisie-club FC Amsterdam. NEC Nijmegen won the championship.

== New entrants ==
Relegated from the 1973–74 Eredivisie

- FC Groningen
- NEC Nijmegen

Fortuna Vlaardingen changed their name to FC Vlaardingen for this season.

== League standings ==
Pos	Team	Pld	W	D	L	GF	GA	GD	Pts	Promotion or qualification
1	NEC	36	15	18	3	50	23	+27	48	Promoted to Eredivisie.
2	FC Groningen	36	21	6	9	63	40	+23	48	Qualified for Promotion play-off as Period champions.
3	Vitesse Arnhem	36	18	9	9	64	40	+24	45	Qualified for Promotion play-off as Period champions.
4	PEC Zwolle	36	17	11	8	50	35	+15	45	Qualified for Promotion play-off as Period champions.
5	VVV-Venlo	36	15	13	8	59	30	+29	43	
6	FC Eindhoven	36	16	11	9	59	37	+22	43	Qualified for Promotion play-off as Period champions.
7	sc Heerenveen	36	17	8	11	47	34	+13	42	
8	FC Volendam	36	15	8	13	56	46	+10	38	
9	Fortuna SC	36	15	8	13	44	35	+9	38	
10	FC Den Bosch	36	11	14	11	41	48	−7	36	
11	SC Heracles	36	11	13	12	49	56	−7	35	
12	SC Amersfoort	36	9	12	15	37	46	−9	30	
13	SC Cambuur	36	10	10	16	43	57	−14	30	
14	Willem II	36	12	5	19	42	51	−9	29	
15	SVV	36	9	10	17	34	52	−18	28	
16	FC Vlaardingen	36	10	8	18	34	56	−22	28	
17	FC Dordrecht	36	9	9	18	40	60	−20	27	
18	Helmond Sport	36	9	9	18	28	49	−21	27	
19	SC Veendam	36	9	6	21	31	76	−45	24	

Source: rsssf.com

== Promotion competition ==
In the promotion competition, four period winners (the best teams during each of the four quarters of the regular competition) played for promotion to the Eredivisie.

Pos	Team	Pld	W	D	L	GF	GA	GD	Pts	Promotion
1	FC Eindhoven	6	5	0	1	16	5	+11	10	Promoted to Eredivisie.
2	FC Groningen	6	3	0	3	10	9	+1	6	
3	Vitesse Arnhem	6	2	0	4	12	13	−1	4	
4	PEC Zwolle	6	2	0	4	3	14	−11	4	

Source: rsssf.com

== Attendances ==
#	Club	Average
1	NEC	6,778
2	Groningen	6,194
3	VVV	5,611
4	Vitesse	5,311
5	Eindhoven	5,172
6	Heerenveen	5,000
7	Zwolle	4,628
8	Willem II	4,306
9	Fortuna	3,983
10	Cambuur	3,444
11	Volendam	3,217
12	Den Bosch	3,144
13	Helmond	3,103
14	Heracles	2,611
15	Veendam	2,589
16	SVV	2,419
17	Vlaardingen	2,083
18	Dordrecht	2,011
19	Amersfoort	1,886

== See also ==
- 1974–75 Eredivisie
- 1974–75 KNVB Cup
