= Niels Overweg =

Dutch footballer

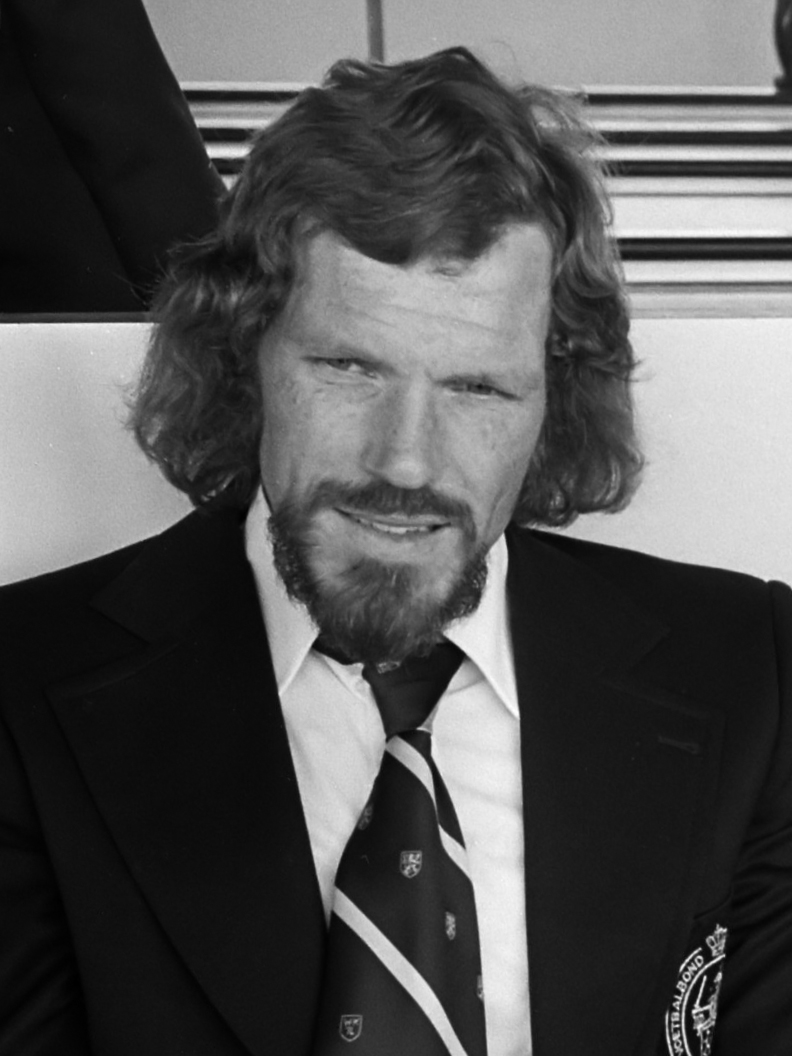
- Overweg in 1975

Personal information
- Full name: Cornelis Karel Overweg
- Date of birth: 15 May 1948 (age 78)
- Place of birth: Amsterdam, Netherlands
- Position: Defender

Senior career*
Years	Team	Apps	(Gls)
1967–1972	DWS	146	(5)
1972–1974	Go Ahead Eagles	61	(5)
1974–1981	FC Twente	181	(8)
1981–1983	DS'79	54	(0)
Total		442	(18)

International career
1975	Netherlands	4	(0)

Managerial career
- 1987: Vitesse
- 1990–1993: Telstar
- 1995: Cambuur (interim)
- * Club domestic league appearances and goals

Niels Overweg (born 15 May 1948) is a Dutch former professional footballer, who played as a defender for DWS, Go Ahead Eagles, FC Twente and DS'79. He was capped four times for the Netherlands national team. After retiring from play, he was also active as manager.

== Club career ==
At the age of nineteen, in the 1967–68 season, Overweg became part of the first team of Eredivisie club DWS. In his first year with the Amsterdam-based club, the defender made fifteen appearances, but was not yet a regular in the squad. In the following year, Overweg made his breakthrough and from then on always played more than 31 league games per season. During this time, the defender also gained his first international experience by taking part in the Inter-Cities Fairs Cup.

In 1972, after DWS merged with Blauw-Wit to form FC Amsterdam, Overweg moved to fellow league side Go Ahead Eagles. Although he was always a regular for the club, there were no successes under either Barry Hughes (1972–73 season) or Jan Notermans (1973–74 season).

With the change to FC Twente in 1974, Overweg made an important step in his career. Although good competition meant he had to fight for his starting place there, he played most of the matches. In his seven years in Enschede, FC Twente reached fourth place in the Eredivisie three times. In the 1976–77 season, they won the KNVB Cup by defeating PEC Zwolle 3–0 in the final. Two years earlier, Overweg had also reached the final with FC Twente, but lost 1–0 against FC Den Haag. In the same season, they also reached the final of the UEFA Cup, played against the German team Borussia Mönchengladbach. After a 0–0 away game, FC Twente lost 5–1 on home soil. Overweg was on the field for both matches.

In the summer of 1981, Overweg moved to Eerste Divisie side DS'79. After two seasons, he ended his active career.

== International career ==
In 1975, Overweg was called up to the Netherlands national team by head coach George Knobel. He made his debut on 17 May 1975 against West Germany, as a substitute at halftime for Frans Thijssen. The match ended in 1–1. For his performance in his fourth international match, a 4–1 defeat against Poland, Overweg was strongly criticized, and he subsequently received no further call-ups.

== Managerial career ==
After his playing career, Overweg went into coaching. In 1987, he managed Vitesse; earlier he had been assistant to Hans Dorjee. Three years later, Overweg became the coach of Telstar from Velsen. In the summer of 1993, he was replaced by Simon Kistemaker. In the 1994–95 season, Overweg was appointed as interim manager of Cambuur after the departure of Fritz Korbach. Soon after, he was replaced by Han Berger. Later, he was also active as youth coach for Cambuur. In 2006, Overweg managed the amateur team of SC Franeker.

== Honours ==
FC Twente

- KNVB Cup: 1976–77; runner-up 1974–75
- UEFA Cup runner-up: 1974–75

DS'79

- Eerste Divisie: 1982–83
