= Theo Pahlplatz =

Dutch footballer (1947–2023)

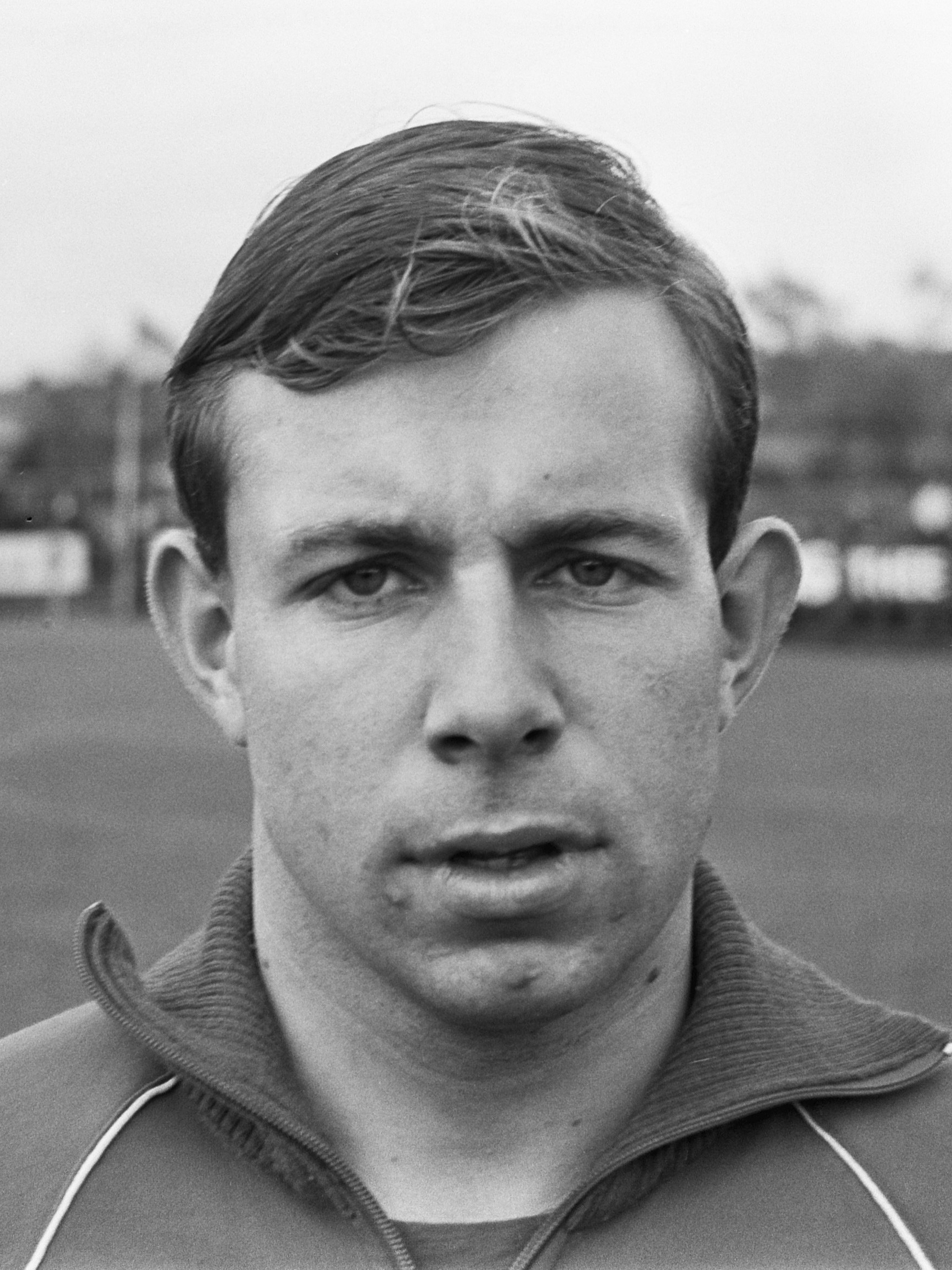
- Pahlpatz in 1966

Personal information
- Full name: Theodorus Hermanus Johannes Maria Pahlplatz
- Date of birth: 3 April 1947
- Place of birth: Oldenzaal, Netherlands
- Date of death: 2 July 2023 (aged 76)
- Height: 1.80 m (5 ft 11 in)
- Positions: Striker; midfielder

Youth career
- Quick '20

Senior career*
| Years | Team | Apps | (Gls) |
| 1966–1979 | FC Twente | 468 | (82) |
- FC Epe

International career
| 1967–1972 | Netherlands | 13 | (3) |
Medal record
Representing FC Twente
| Gold medal – first place | KNVB Cup | 1977 |
- * Club domestic league appearances and goals

Theo Pahlplatz, born Theodorus Hermanus Johannes Maria Pahlplatz (3 April 1947 – 2 July 2023), was a Dutch footballer who played as a striker or midfielder.

== Club career ==
Pahlplatz spent most of his career with FC Twente after a spell with hometown club Quick '20. He was part of the team that won the 1976–77 KNVB Cup, and also played European football in the UEFA Cup, ending up on the losing side in the 1975 UEFA Cup final.

== International career ==
Pahlplatz made his debut for the Netherlands in a November 1967 friendly match against the Soviet Union and earned a total of 13 caps, scoring 3 goals. His final international was a November 1972 World Cup qualification match against Norway.

== Personal life and death ==
His son Boudewijn also played professionally for Twente and PSV.

Pahlplatz died on 2 July 2023, at the age of 76.
