= 1974–75 Eredivisie =

19th season of the Eredivisie

Eredivisie
- Season: 1974–75
- Champions: PSV Eindhoven (5th title)
- Promoted: SBV Excelsior; FC Wageningen
- Relegated: HFC Haarlem; FC Wageningen
- European Cup: PSV Eindhoven
- Cup Winners' Cup: FC Den Haag
- UEFA Cup: Feyenoord; AFC Ajax
- Goals: 875
- Average goals/game: 2.85
- Top goalscorer: (Netherlands) Ruud Geels; AFC Ajax 30 goals

The Dutch Eredivisie in the 1974–75 season was contested by 18 teams. PSV won the championship.

== League standings ==
Pos	Team	Pld	W	D	L	GF	GA	GD	Pts	Qualification or relegation
1	PSV Eindhoven	34	23	9	2	82	26	+56	55	Qualified for 1975–76 European Cup
2	Feyenoord	34	23	7	4	94	29	+65	53	Qualified for 1975–76 UEFA Cup
3	AFC Ajax	34	21	7	6	76	34	+42	49	Qualified for 1975–76 UEFA Cup
4	FC Twente	34	17	8	9	56	35	+21	42	
5	AZ '67	34	14	12	8	50	32	+18	40	
6	Sparta Rotterdam	34	9	18	7	43	37	+6	36	
7	Telstar	34	11	14	9	42	45	−3	36	
8	Roda JC	34	11	10	13	50	61	−11	32	
9	FC Amsterdam	34	10	11	13	49	48	+1	31	
10	FC Den Haag	34	7	16	11	33	42	−9	30	Qualified for 1975–76 European Cup Winners' Cup
11	MVV Maastricht	34	7	14	13	43	55	−12	28	
12	Go Ahead Eagles	34	9	10	15	40	55	−15	28	
13	De Graafschap	34	10	8	16	32	56	−24	28	
14	SBV Excelsior	34	7	12	15	32	53	−21	26	
15	FC Utrecht	34	8	10	16	40	62	−22	26	
16	NAC	34	8	9	17	38	62	−24	25	
17	HFC Haarlem	34	7	10	17	36	69	−33	24	Relegated to Eerste Divisie
18	FC Wageningen	34	7	9	18	39	74	−35	23	Relegated to Eerste Divisie

Source: rsssf.com

== Results ==
Home \ Away	AJA	AMS	AZ	EXC	FEY	GAE	GRA	DHA	HFC	MVV	NAC	PSV	RJC	SPA	TEL	TWE	UTR	WAG
Ajax		2–4	4–0	2–0	0–1	3–0	3–1	3–1	4–0	4–2	5–1	2–4	6–1	2–0	1–1	1–0	3–0	3–1
FC Amsterdam	1–2		0–0	1–1	0–3	2–0	6–0	1–1	2–1	0–0	3–0	1–2	2–2	5–2	0–0	0–3	1–1	1–1
AZ '67	3–0	2–0		1–1	1–1	1–0	3–0	0–0	2–0	2–0	2–4	2–1	0–0	0–0	2–1	1–1	5–0	1–0
Excelsior	1–2	1–0	1–1		0–1	1–2	1–0	0–0	1–1	0–0	3–0	1–3	2–1	2–2	0–0	3–1	2–2	1–0
Feyenoord	2–1	1–2	2–1	2–1		3–1	2–0	3–0	4–0	2–1	3–1	2–3	4–0	1–1	4–1	4–0	5–0	8–2
Go Ahead Eagles	2–2	1–1	1–0	4–0	0–6		2–0	3–1	2–0	2–2	2–0	0–0	2–2	1–1	0–0	1–1	1–1	5–1
De Graafschap	0–0	2–1	0–5	2–0	1–6	3–0		1–0	2–2	3–1	1–0	1–1	1–1	0–0	1–1	0–1	2–1	1–0
FC Den Haag	1–0	2–1	0–0	1–0	3–3	0–0	0–1		1–1	2–1	4–1	1–1	1–1	0–0	2–0	1–3	1–2	2–0
Haarlem	1–4	1–3	0–2	1–0	0–3	2–0	0–4	1–1		3–1	1–1	1–1	4–2	1–3	1–1	1–0	1–0	3–2
MVV	0–0	3–1	2–1	0–1	2–2	1–0	1–0	1–1	2–2		0–1	1–3	3–2	1–1	2–2	2–4	1–1	2–1
NAC	1–4	3–0	1–2	1–1	1–5	4–1	1–1	2–2	3–1	1–1		0–4	2–1	0–2	1–1	1–2	3–1	0–0
PSV	1–1	3–0	4–0	7–0	3–2	5–1	3–0	3–1	3–2	1–1	1–0		2–0	1–0	1–0	3–0	6–0	2–0
Roda JC	0–1	1–1	2–2	4–2	1–0	2–1	2–0	3–1	4–2	0–3	1–0	0–4		1–1	0–1	2–1	3–0	3–1
Sparta	1–1	2–1	0–0	3–1	0–0	1–4	4–0	0–0	0–0	2–2	4–2	1–2	1–1		4–1	1–1	1–0	3–3
Telstar	1–4	0–2	1–0	1–1	0–4	2–1	2–1	1–0	2–2	2–0	0–0	2–2	4–2	1–1		1–0	4–0	3–1
FC Twente '65	1–3	2–1	1–1	2–0	1–1	3–0	2–0	3–0	4–0	2–2	2–0	2–1	3–0	1–0	1–1		4–1	3–0
FC Utrecht	1–1	2–2	2–1	3–1	0–0	3–0	3–2	1–1	3–0	4–2	0–1	0–0	1–3	0–1	0–2	0–0		7–1
Wageningen	0–2	1–3	2–6	2–2	1–4	1–0	1–1	1–1	2–0	2–0	1–1	1–1	2–2	1–0	4–2	2–1	1–0	

Source: rsssf.com
Legend: Blue = home team win; Yellow = draw; Red = away team win.

== Attendances ==
#	Club	Average	Change
1	Feyenoord	37,185	+4.5
2	Ajax	21,253	+0.9
3	PSV	19,029	+11.7
4	Roda	13,441	+41.9
5	AZ	11,912	+13.1
6	Twente	10,029	−22.9
7	De Graafschap	9,676	−12.3
8	Den Haag	9,629	+16.5
9	Utrecht	9,471	−1.4
10	MVV	8,750	−8.7
11	Go Ahead Eagles	8,412	−4.0
12	Wageningen	8,265	+243.2
13	NAC	8,118	−9.5
14	Sparta	7,756	−16.6
15	Haarlem	6,588	−14.5
16	Amsterdam	6,471	−36.4
17	Excelsior	6,324	+67.5
18	Telstar	6,059	−3.7

== See also ==
- 1974–75 Eerste Divisie
- 1974–75 KNVB Cup
