= Esko Oranen =

Finnish farmer and politician (1868–1951)

Eskil (Esko) Oranen (25 July 1868 – 27 March 1951) was a Finnish farmer and politician, born in Pyhäjärvi. He was a member of the Parliament of Finland from 1910 to 1913, representing the Agrarian League.
