= Eddy Achterberg =

Dutch football player and coach (born 1947)

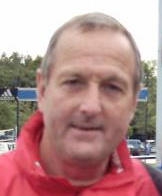

Personal information
- Date of birth: February 21, 1947 (age 79)
- Place of birth: Utrecht, Netherlands
- Position: Midfielder

Senior career*
Years	Team	Apps	(Gls)
1964–1967	DOS	65	(12)
1967–1976	FC Twente	247	(26)
1976–1978	FC Groningen	29	(2)
Total		341	(40)

Managerial career
- 1988–1990: FC Twente (youth team)
- 1990–1993: FC Twente (assistant)
- 1993–1996: Roda JC (assistant)
- 1996: Roda JC (caretaker)
- 1996–1998: Roda JC (assistant)
- 1998–2000: Schalke 04 (assistant)
- 2000–2002: FC Twente (assistant)
- 2002–2003: FC Twente (second team)
- 2003–2004: Schalke 04 (assistant)
- 2004: Schalke 04 (caretaker)
- 2004–2005: Schalke 04 (assistant)
- 2005–2009: Schalke 04 (scout)
- 2009–2011: Red Bull Salzburg (assistant)
- 2011–2011: Red Bull Salzburg (scout)
- * Club domestic league appearances and goals

Eddy Achterberg (born 21 February 1947 in Utrecht) is a retired Dutch football player and coach. Following his retirement from professional play in 1978, Achterberg would go on to work both as an assistant manager and scout for various teams across Netherlands and Germany, such as FC Twente, Roda JC, FC Schalke 04, and FC Red Bull Salzburg.

== Career ==
=== Club ===
A professional for fifteen years prior to signing for Dutch side DOS (the predecessor to FC Utrecht), Eddy Achterberg transferred to FC Twente in 1967, playing 246 games for the Eredivisie club, scoring 26 goals. The midfielder played in 27 UEFA Cup matches for Twente; reaching the semi-final in the 1972–73 season and the final during the 1973–74 season, where the club lost to Borussia Mönchengladbach. After breaking his leg in 1974, he never returned to his previous form, and transferred to FC Groningen in 1976, retiring in 1978.

=== Managerial ===
Following the end of his playing career, he became the representative of a German sportswear manufacturer, and innkeeper. In 1988, he became youth and second team coach, and later co-manager at former club FC Twente. In 1994, he moved to Roda JC Kerkrade, where he co-managed alongside Huub Stevens. After Stevens moved to FC Schalke 04, Achterberg was briefly promoted to head coach, before following his colleague to the Bundesliga club, with whom he won the UEFA Cup in 1997. Achterberg returned to FC Twente in 2000, becoming co-manager alongside Fred Rutten, winning the KNVB Cup the same season. After a spell as coach of the Twente second team, Achterberg spent a second spell in Gelsenkirchen from 2003 until 2005. Following the dismissal of Jupp Heynckes on 15 September until the appointment of Ralf Rangnick on 28 September 2004, he briefly served as caretaker-manager of the club.

During his time in Enschede, Achterberg's nickname was De Keu, which goes back to "het keutje", as he was called in Utrecht. In the local dialect, this is another name for "Little pig." According to Achterberg: "The name didn't fit me at all, which was the very reason I was given it. My friends would always say to me: Here comes 'de Keu,' the fat pig with the crooked legs."

Achterberg, along with other players and fans of FC Twente, released a song entitled "Eenmaal zullen wij de kampioenen zijn" (Once we will be the Champions) in the successful 1973/4 season, which became the unofficial club song.
