= Johan Zuidema =

Dutch footballer (born 1948)

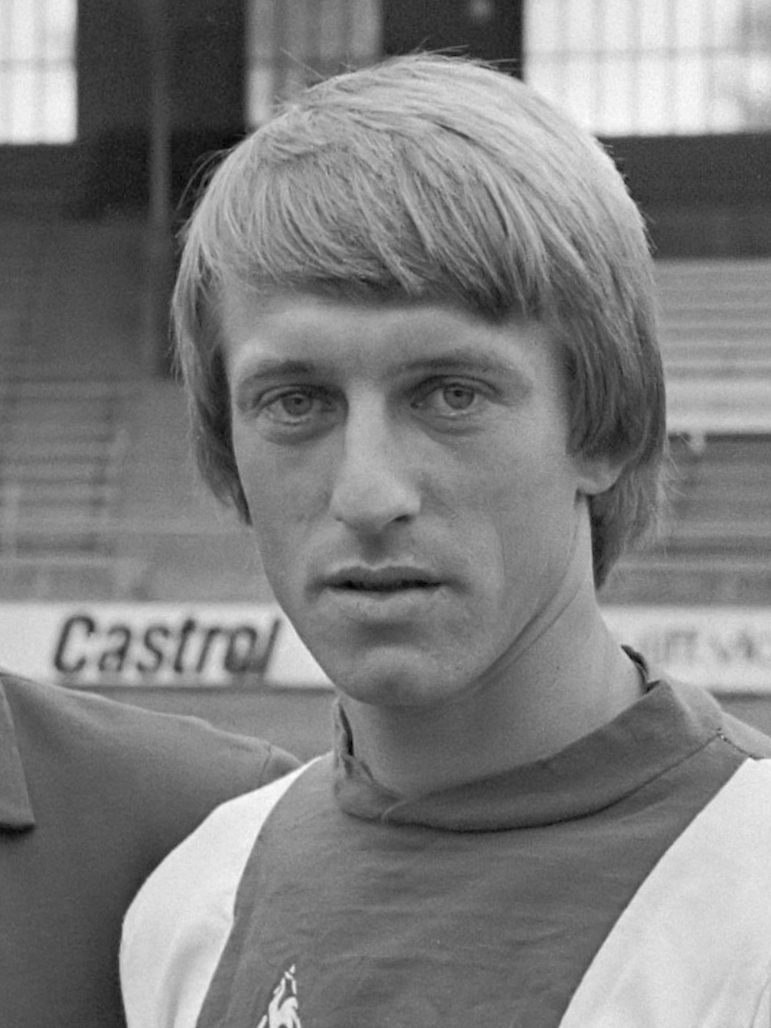

Personal information
- Full name: Johan Zuidema
- Date of birth: 21 September 1948 (age 78)
- Place of birth: De Westereen, Netherlands
- Position: Forward

Senior career*
Years	Team	Apps	(Gls)
1971–1973	SC Cambuur		
1973–1975	FC Twente		(24)
1975–1976	NEC Nijmegen		
1976–1979	AFC Ajax		

International career
1975	Netherlands	2	(0)
- * Club domestic league appearances and goals

Johan Zuidema (born 21 September 1948) is a former Dutch footballer. He was twice the leading scorer for FC Twente, scoring 14 goals in 1973–74 and 10 goals in 1974–75, and participated in the 1975 UEFA Cup Final.
