= Kick van der Vall =

Dutch footballer

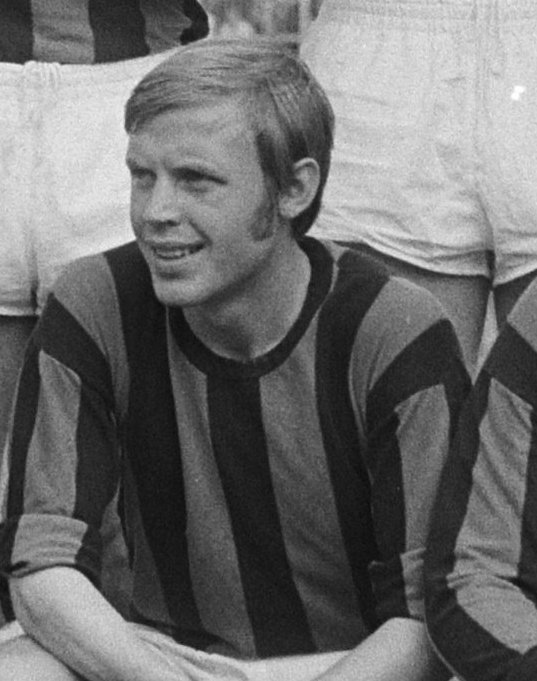
- van der Vall in 1968

Personal information
- Full name: Christiaan Alfred van der Vall
- Date of birth: 3 March 1946 (age 80)
- Place of birth: Rotterdam, Netherlands
- Position: Midfielder

Senior career*
Years	Team	Apps	(Gls)
1963–1967	Feyenoord	35	(4)
1967–1968	FC Twente	33	(7)
1968–1969	DWS	33	(5)
1969–1979	FC Twente	315	(51)
1979–1981	Vitesse	54	(0)
Total		470	(67)
- * Club domestic league appearances and goals

Christian Alfred "Kick" van der Vall (born 3 March 1946) is a Dutch former professional footballer, who played as an attacking midfielder for Feyenoord, DWS, Vitesse, and is best known for his longer spell at FC Twente.

== Career ==
Van der Vall started playing youth football at Feyenoord. In 1963, he scored 3 goals against Ajax in the final of the Dutch youth championship. He made his Eredivisie debut on 13 December that year, scoring the winning goal against GVAV. He failed to win a regular starting position and after 4 years and 35 matches van der Vall moved to FC Twente.

Coached by Kees Rijvers he immediately became a starter and scored 7 goals his first season at Twente. After only 1 year van der Vall moved to DWS. In Amsterdam he played his first international football in the Inter-Cities Fairs Cup.

In 1977, Twente won the Dutch Cup. In 1979, van der Vall had to move as Twente wanted to bring in younger players. He played 2 more years at Vitesse before retiring from professional football. Vitesse was relegated in 1980, so van der Vall played his final year in the Eerste Divisie.

In the 2019/2020 season FC Twente will play in the shirt of the brand Kick's 21. A new brand, exclusively developed for FC Twente, that bears the name of Kick van der Vall. The new brand is a tribute to the midfielder, who always played with number 21.
