= 1973–74 Eredivisie =

18th season of the Eredivisie

Eredivisie
- Season: 1973–74
- Champions: Feyenoord (11th title)
- Promoted: De Graafschap; Roda JC
- Relegated: NEC; FC Groningen
- European Cup: Feyenoord
- Cup Winners' Cup: PSV Eindhoven
- UEFA Cup: FC Twente; AFC Ajax; FC Amsterdam
- Goals: 907
- Average goals/game: 2.96
- Top goalscorer: (Netherlands) Willy van der Kuijlen; PSV Eindhoven; 27 goals

The Dutch Eredivisie in the 1973–74 season was contested by 18 teams. Feyenoord won the championship.

== League standings ==
Pos	Team	Pld	W	D	L	GF	GA	GD	Pts	Qualification or relegation
1	Feyenoord	34	25	6	3	96	28	+68	56	Qualified for 1974–75 European Cup
2	FC Twente	34	23	8	3	65	27	+38	54	Qualified for 1974–75 UEFA Cup
3	AFC Ajax	34	21	9	4	88	30	+58	51	Qualified for 1974–75 UEFA Cup
4	PSV Eindhoven	34	20	9	5	96	40	+56	49	Qualified for 1974–75 European Cup Winners' Cup
5	FC Amsterdam	34	17	9	8	49	36	+13	43	Qualified for 1974–75 UEFA Cup
6	Telstar	34	12	12	10	53	50	+3	36	
7	AZ '67	34	10	13	11	37	39	−2	33	
8	Sparta Rotterdam	34	10	12	12	37	45	−8	32	
9	FC Utrecht	34	14	4	16	53	65	−12	32	
10	Go Ahead Eagles	34	11	10	13	44	58	−14	32	
11	MVV Maastricht	34	8	14	12	36	52	−16	30	
12	HFC Haarlem	34	10	6	18	33	46	−13	26	
13	FC Den Haag	34	8	10	16	29	53	−24	26	
14	De Graafschap	34	8	10	16	43	75	−32	26	
15	Roda JC	34	6	10	18	31	56	−25	22	
16	NAC	34	6	10	18	44	72	−28	22	
17	NEC	34	6	9	19	33	51	−18	21	Relegated to Eerste Divisie
18	FC Groningen	34	7	7	20	40	84	−44	21	Relegated to Eerste Divisie

Source: rsssf.com

== Results ==
Home \ Away	AJA	AMS	AZ	FEY	GAE	GRA	GRO	DHA	HFC	MVV	NAC	NEC	PSV	RJC	SPA	TEL	TWE	UTR
Ajax		6–1	2–0	2–1	5–1	4–0	9–0	3–1	5–0	4–1	3–0	2–1	1–1	3–0	0–0	7–2	1–1	5–2
FC Amsterdam	1–0		1–0	1–1	3–0	2–1	2–0	3–0	0–1	2–2	2–2	5–0	2–1	2–0	3–1	3–1	2–3	2–1
AZ '67	1–1	0–2		1–2	0–0	4–0	3–1	1–1	2–0	1–2	0–0	0–0	2–2	1–1	2–0	2–1	0–1	2–0
Feyenoord	2–2	5–0	4–0		1–0	2–0	7–0	3–3	4–1	3–1	3–0	6–1	1–1	8–0	4–0	1–0	3–2	2–1
Go Ahead Eagles	2–2	2–2	1–1	1–3		1–1	5–0	2–0	1–0	0–0	1–1	1–1	3–5	3–1	1–0	4–3	0–1	2–1
De Graafschap	1–0	0–2	2–0	5–7	3–0		3–3	2–0	1–1	1–1	2–0	1–0	0–3	1–1	1–1	1–1	0–0	3–0
FC Groningen	0–4	1–2	0–2	0–3	1–0	2–2		2–2	2–1	1–1	4–2	2–0	1–2	1–3	2–2	1–2	1–2	2–2
FC Den Haag	0–1	0–1	0–1	0–2	1–1	1–1	1–0		1–0	1–1	8–3	1–0	0–3	0–5	0–2	2–0	0–0	2–0
Haarlem	0–1	2–0	1–1	0–1	2–1	6–3	0–2	0–1		2–2	3–1	2–1	2–0	1–0	0–1	2–1	1–2	0–2
MVV	0–4	0–0	1–1	0–0	1–0	4–1	2–5	0–0	0–0		1–0	0–1	4–3	4–1	0–3	0–2	0–1	1–0
NAC	2–3	0–1	0–0	1–0	1–2	4–0	4–1	1–1	0–3	3–0		1–3	2–4	2–0	0–0	1–1	0–2	2–4
N.E.C.	1–1	0–0	0–1	0–2	2–2	1–2	3–0	0–0	3–0	2–2	1–2		1–2	4–0	2–1	1–1	0–2	0–1
PSV	3–1	2–1	5–1	0–2	10–0	3–0	4–0	6–0	1–1	4–2	7–1	2–1		3–0	3–1	1–1	1–1	5–0
Roda JC	0–0	0–0	0–0	0–3	1–2	4–0	1–0	0–1	0–0	1–2	0–0	1–1	1–3		0–0	2–1	0–2	5–2
Sparta	1–2	1–0	1–1	1–3	1–3	2–1	0–0	1–0	1–0	1–1	2–2	2–0	1–1	2–1		1–2	1–2	2–1
Telstar	2–1	0–0	3–0	3–2	0–1	5–3	3–0	3–0	1–0	0–0	2–2	2–1	1–1	2–2	2–2		0–0	2–2
FC Twente '65	0–0	2–0	2–5	1–1	2–1	7–0	3–2	2–0	2–1	3–0	5–2	2–0	1–1	1–0	3–0	3–1		2–0
FC Utrecht	2–3	1–1	2–1	0–4	2–0	3–1	2–3	3–1	2–0	1–0	3–2	2–1	4–3	1–0	2–2	1–2	3–2	

Source: rsssf.com
Legend: Blue = home team win; Yellow = draw; Red = away team win.

== Attendances ==
#	Club	Average	Change
1	Feyenoord	35,569	+4.3
2	Ajax	21,059	−10.7
3	PSV	17,029	+39.5
4	Twente	13,000	+14.8
5	De Graafschap	11,029	+86.3
6	AZ	10,533	+17.4
7	Amsterdam	10,176	+37.0
8	Utrecht	9,606	−6.1
9	MVV	9,588	−3.9
10	Roda	9,471	+21.6
11	Sparta	9,294	−25.3
12	NEC	9,147	+11.5
13	NAC	8,971	+14.2
14	Go Ahead Eagles	8,765	+1.4
15	Den Haag	8,265	−19.3
16	Haarlem	7,706	+3.6
17	Groningen	7,471	−2.3
18	Telstar	6,294	−10.5

== See also ==
- 1973–74 Eerste Divisie
- 1973–74 KNVB Cup
