= FC Twente =

Dutch professional football club

Twente
- Full name: Football Club Twente
- Nicknames: De Tukkers (The Tukkers) (Note: "Tukker" is a colloquial term referring to a person from Twente.); Trots van het Oosten (Pride of the East); De Roodhemden (The Reds)
- Founded: 1 July 1965; 61 years ago
- Stadium: De Grolsch Veste
- Capacity: 30,205
- Chairman: Dominique Scholten
- Head coach: John van den Brom
- League: Eredivisie
- 2025–26: Eredivisie, 4th of 18
- Website: www.fctwente.nl
Home colours	Away colours	Third colours

Football Club Twente (Dutch pronunciation: [ɛfˈseː ˈtʋɛntə]), sometimes known internationally as Twente Enschede, or simply Twente, is a Dutch professional football club from Enschede. The club was formed in 1965 by the merger of Enschedese Boys with Sportclub Enschede, the 1926 Dutch champions. Twente have won the Eredivisie once, the KNVB Cup three times, and the Johan Cruyff Shield twice. They also finished runners-up in the Eredivisie twice, and reached the 1975 UEFA Cup final, which they lost against Borussia Mönchengladbach.

Twente's home ground since 1998 is De Grolsch Veste. Since 2019, the team have played in the Eredivisie, the top division of Dutch football. The club takes its name from the region of Twente, the eastern part of Overijssel.

== History ==
=== Foundation and early years ===
The club was formed in 1965 as a merger of two professional clubs, Sportclub Enschede and the Enschedese Boys. One of such predecessors, SC Enschede, had also won a single Dutch championship in 1926.

The first successes of the club started just after the merger of 1965, under the innovative coach Kees Rijvers. Twente finished third in 1969, fourth in 1970, fifth in 1971, third in 1972 and again in 1973. The team's key figures were local heroes, such as Epi Drost, Eddy Achterberg, Kick van der Vall and Theo Pahlplatz. Their finest Eredivisie season was 1973–74, in which Twente battled for the Dutch championship with Feyenoord. A head-to-head confrontation in the final game of the season, in Rotterdam, where Feyenoord prevailed 3–2, sealed Twente's fate in second. Nonetheless, this earned the side a position in the UEFA Cup.

The Tukkers, as FC Twente fans are known, made the most of their UEFA Cup appearance in 1974–75, making it all the way to the final, where they lost 0–0 on aggregate (1–5 on away goals) to German side Borussia Mönchengladbach. They also eliminated the likes of Juventus en route to the final.

In 1977, Twente won their first trophy, the KNVB Cup, after beating PEC Zwolle 3–0.

=== The 1980s and 1990s ===
After enjoying some success in the 1970s, prospects went downhill for Twente, with the club ultimately suffering relegation to the Eerste Divisie, the Dutch second division, in 1983. However, Twente returned to the top flight a year later, but the club soon became known for their "impressive" amount of 1–1 and 0–0 draws. Although the club's "boring" reputation seemed to stick, Twente continued to achieve European qualification on a regular basis, qualifying for Europe five times between 1985 and 2009.

Re-establishment then followed in the 1990s: German coach Hans Meyer led Twente to third-place in the Eredivisie of 1997 and into the third round of the 1997–98 UEFA Cup the next season. On 24 May 2001, Twente clinched their second triumph in the KNVB Cup after beating PSV in the final after being 3–1 down in the penalty shoot-out. The season after, Twente crashed out of the Cup at the hands of Ajax's second team. Additionally, results in the league were poor, with hardcore Twente fans Ultras Vak-P eventually going on a rampage at the club's brand-new stadium, De Grolsch Veste, out of frustration.

=== From bankruptcy to national champions (2002–2011) ===
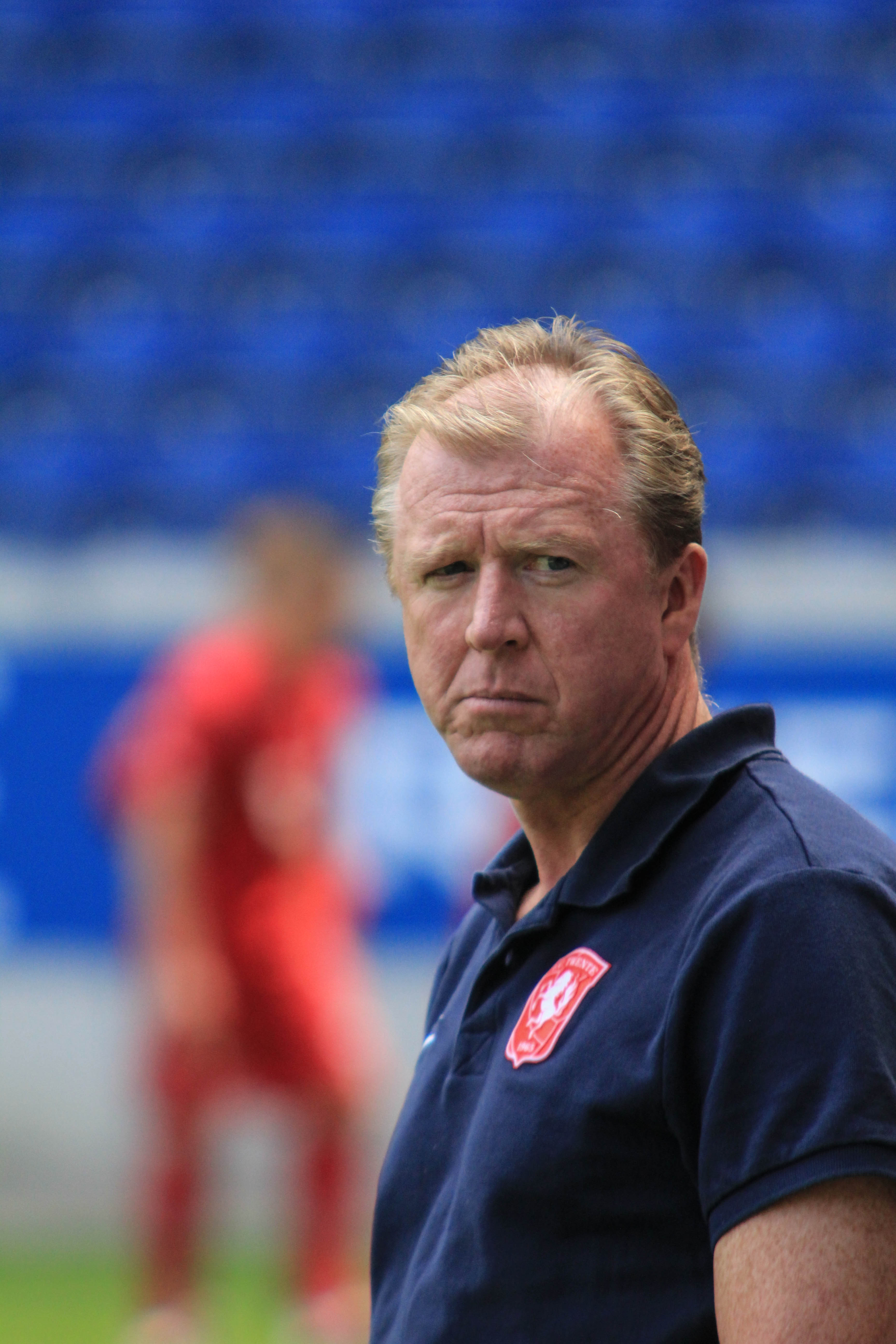
Steve McClaren, the first manager to win the title for FC Twente.

The club's mother corporation (FC Twente '65) was declared bankrupt in the 2002–03 season, almost leading to the club's going out of existence. Despite the club's financial troubles, it continued to enjoy success, reaching the 2004 KNVB Cup final, and finishing fourth in the 2006-07 Eredivisie season under the stewardship of chairman Joop Munsterman. In the 2007–08 season, Twente placed fourth and won the play-offs for a ticket to the Champions League qualifiers by defeating Ajax in the play-off finals.

In the 2008–09 season, Twente hired former England manager Steve McClaren as its new head coach. Under his tenure, unseeded Twente entered the draw for the third qualifying round of the Champions League, being drawn against seeded Arsenal. The two legs were played at home on 13 August and away on 27 August 2008. Twente lost 6–0 on aggregate, resulting in their elimination from the Champions League and subsequent entry of the 2008–09 UEFA Cup first round. At the domestic level, Twente finished second in the Eredivisie, 11 points behind champions AZ, and again secured entry to the Champions League qualifying rounds as Dutch runners-up, as well as KNVB Cup finalists (defeated by Heerenveen).

The 2009–10 season started with Twente being knocked out of the 2009–10 UEFA Champions League third qualifying round after a 1–1 aggregate draw against Sporting CP, which sent the Portuguese side through on away goals. The club was then admitted to the Europa League, where it enjoyed a relatively successful path that ended in a 4–2 aggregate defeat at the hands of Werder Bremen in the round of 32. At the domestic level, Twente won its first Eredivisie title at the end of a campaign in which they lost just twice, winning 16 of 17 at home. The championship was confirmed on the final day of the season when they beat NAC 2–0 away, making Steve McClaren the first Englishman to guide a Dutch team to a national title since Bobby Robson in 1992. The victory qualified Twente for the 2010–11 UEFA Champions League group stage, the club's first appearance in the competition. At the end of the season, McClaren resigned as the manager, moving to German side VfL Wolfsburg, and was replaced by the Belgian Michel Preud'homme. Twente continued their success by having a good run during the 2010–11 KNVB Cup, reaching the final on 8 May 2011 at De Kuip. Twente recovered from 2–0 down to defeat Ajax 3–2 in extra time with a winner from Marc Janko, which claimed the club's third KNVB Cup title. One week later, the two teams faced each other in Amsterdam in the final round of matches in the Eredivisie, with Twente leading by a point. However, Ajax gained revenge for the Cup defeat by winning 3–1, to claim their first title in seven years.

The start of the 2011–12 season, under Preud'homme's successor Co Adriaanse, featured another clash between the duo in the Amsterdam Arena, this time with Twente winning 2–1 in their second successive Johan Cruijff Shield supercup victory.

=== Financial problems and relegation (2014–2019) ===
During the 2014–15 Eredivisie season, Twente found themselves in financial trouble again, forcing the Royal Dutch Football Association (KNVB) to deduct the club three points from the side in March 2015. Club President Munsterman, who had announced to leave the club at the end of the season, then already quit the club on 1 April 2015 over allegations of financial mismanagement. The team fired 18 employees and stopped with their scouting department after they received a second three-point penalty in April 2015. They also decided to withdraw Jong Twente from the Eerste Divisie for the 2015–16 season and the women's professional team was relocated in a separate foundation. On 18 May 2016, the KNVB declared its intent to relegate FC Twente to the Eerste Divisie. This was however still subject to appeal by FC Twente and on 17 June 2016, the KNVB appeal committee decided that Twente can remain in the Eredivisie. At the end of the 2017–18 Eredivisie season, Twente relegated to the Eerste Divisie by finishing at the bottom of the table at the end of the season, after having fired two managers that season. The 2018–19 Eerste Divisie season was the first outside of the top flight for 34 years. Commercial director Jan van Halst felt partly responsible and then stepped down.

=== Back to Europe ===
In the Eerste Divisie, Twente had a season marked by ups and downs. From December 2018, however, through a 15-game stretch, not a single loss was recorded, giving the club a big lead over the competition. On 22 April 2019, the title and promotion were secured. Twente drew 0–0 at home against Jong AZ, but because the last remaining competitor Sparta Rotterdam lost, Twente could no longer be reached.

Despite Pušić's success in earning Twente promotion, he was let go and replaced by his assistant Gonzalo García, who was put in charge of the club for their return to the Eredivisie. After a strong start, a 3–2 home defeat to archrivals Heracles Almelo was the start of a lesser period. Twente dropped to the bottom regions of the Eredivisie and after an impressive victory over AZ, three more defeats followed. However, after a 1–0 defeat against Vitesse, the Eredivisie season was abandoned due to the COVID-19 pandemic in the Netherlands. As a result, Twente finished the 2019–20 season in fourteenth place, safe of relegation.

At the beginning of the 2020–21 season, García was also dismissed to be succeeded by the experienced Ron Jans. At the same time, Jan Streuer became technical director as a replacement for the Ted van Leeuwen who had resigned. Streuer brought in players such as Queensy Menig and Václav Černý, who would both become key players in the following season. After an excellent first half of the season, the results in the second half of the season were disappointing. Twente missed play-offs for European football and finished in tenth place. As a result of this season, Streuer wanted to bring more experienced players to the club, and signed Robin Pröpper and Ricky van Wolfswinkel. In addition, youth players were increasingly integrated in the first team with Mees Hilgers, Ramiz Zerrouki and Daan Rots becoming starters. Jody Lukoki was also signed, but he was seriously injured shortly after his arrival, which meant that he never played a match for Twente. Lukoki's contract was terminated on 17 February 2022 after being convicted of domestic violence. Three months later, on 9 May 2022, Lukoki died of cardiac arrest after being beaten by family members.

After a strong season, Twente finished in fourth place in the league table and qualified for the third qualifying round of the 2022–23 UEFA Europa Conference League; their first return to Europe in eight years.

== Affiliated clubs ==
The following clubs are affiliated with Twente:

- (United States) Dayton Dutch Lions
- (Azerbaijan) Qarabağ
- (Hungary) Kozármisleny
- (Netherlands) Heracles Almelo
- (Scotland) Stranraer

== Stadium ==
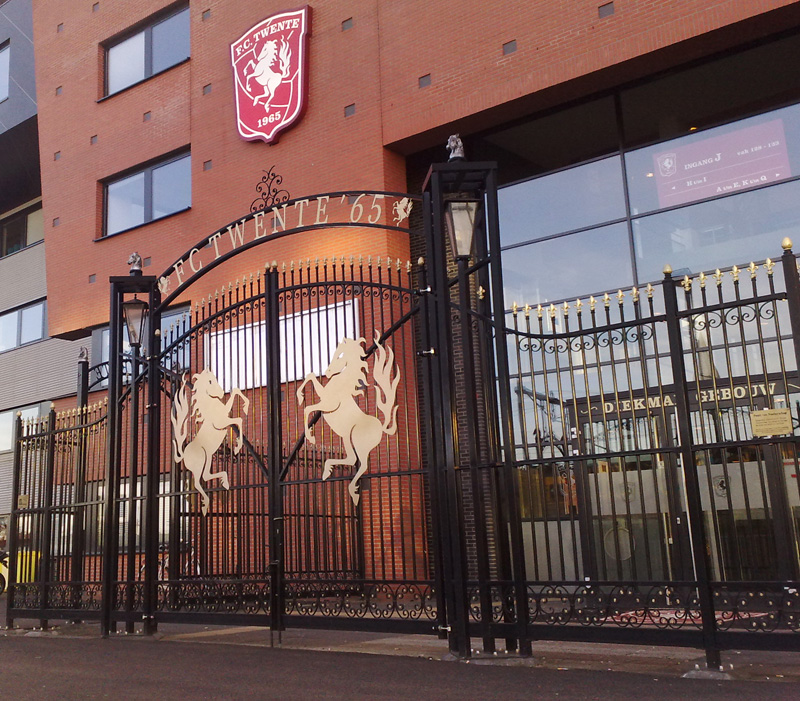
The gate at the stadium symbolises the club's history.

De Grolsch Veste, formerly named Arke Stadion, is the official stadium of FC Twente and is owned by the club. It is located at the Business & Science Park, near the University of Twente and between the city centers of Enschede and Hengelo. It has a spectator capacity of 30,205 with a standard pitch heating system and has a promenade instead of fences around the stands.

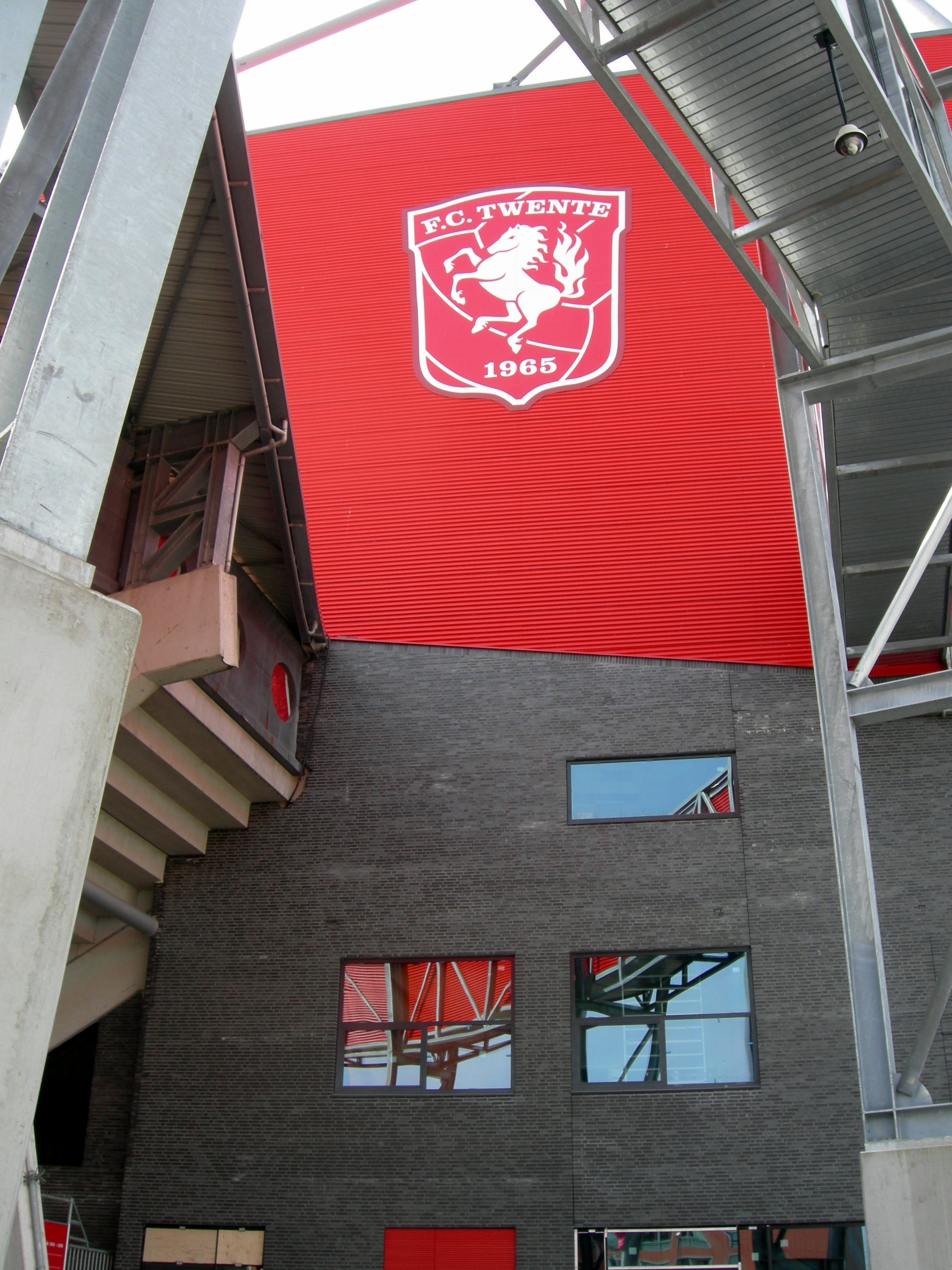
De Grolsch Veste corner from the outside

De Grolsch Veste replaced the old Diekman Stadion as Twente's home ground on 22 March 1998. Initially, plans had been afoot to expand and renovate the old and now demolished Diekman stadium. However, with a growing fan capacity and with arguments that the location of the Diekman stadium was not strategic enough, the idea was conceived to build a new arena for the Twente fans. The Diekman ground also faced problems with its seating plans as a result of the FIFA regulations, which impose a requirement to construct a seating stand behind each goal.

The new stadium, De Grolsch Veste, cost an estimated 33 million guilders and took 14 months to build, with construction starting on 31 January 1997. Due to the tight budget available, the layout of the stadium was constructed so that future expansions are possible without the necessity to tear down entire existing stands.

On 10 May 1998, the first match played at the stadium resulted in a 3–0 victory by the home team against PSV in an Eredivisie match.

Initially, the Grolsch Veste had a capacity of 13,500 spectators, which was later reduced to 13,250. As of the start of the 2008–09 season, the stadium has been expanded with a partial second ring increasing the capacity to 24,000 seats. After a second expansion, completed in 2011, the current capacity became 30,205.

The recording of "You'll Never Walk Alone" by Gerry and the Pacemakers is sung along in the whole stadium before every kick-off.

On 7 July 2011, a section of the stadium roof collapsed whilst expansion work was taking place at the stadium, killing two people.

== Current squad ==
As of 13 September 2026

Note: Flags indicate national team as defined under FIFA eligibility rules; some limited exceptions apply. Players may hold more than one non-FIFA nationality.

No.	Pos.	Nation	Player
1	GK	GER	Lars Unnerstall
2	DF	POL	Michał Rosiak
3	DF	NED	Robin Pröpper
4	DF	NED	Ruud Nijstad
6	MF	ALG	Ramiz Zerrouki
7	FW	CRO	Marko Pjaca
8	MF	FRA	Daouda Weidmann
9	FW	NED	Wout Weghorst
10	FW	MAR	Younes Taha
11	FW	NED	Daan Rots
14	MF	ISL	Kristian Hlynsson
16	GK	NED	Joël Drommel
17	FW	NOR	Filip Thorvaldsen
18	MF	BEL	Jordy Bawuah

No.	Pos.	Nation	Player
20	MF	NED	Thomas van den Belt
22	GK	NED	Remko Pasveer
23	DF	ISR	Stav Lemkin
24	DF	POL	Krzysztof Kurowski
25	FW	NED	Lucas Vennegoor of Hesselink
27	MF	NOR	Sondre Ørjasæter
28	DF	NED	Bart van Rooij
29	DF	DEN	Aske Adelgaard
31	GK	NED	Yannick Gerritsen
37	FW	TUR	Naci Ünüvar
38	DF	NED	Max Bruns
41	MF	NED	Gijs Besselink
44	MF	MAR	Juliën Mesbahi

=== Out on loan ===
Note: Flags indicate national team as defined under FIFA eligibility rules; some limited exceptions apply. Players may hold more than one non-FIFA nationality.

No.	Pos.	Nation	Player
8	MF	USA	Taylor Booth (at Real Salt Lake until 30 June 2027)
12	DF	POR	Guilherme Peixoto (at Roda JC until 30 June 2027)
21	GK	NED	Sam Karssies (at FC Emmen until 30 June 2027)

== Honours ==
=== National ===
- Eredivisie
  - Winners: 2009–10
  - Runners-up: 1973–74, 2008–09, 2010–11
- Eerste Divisie
  - Winners: 2018–19
- KNVB Cup
  - Winners: 1976–77, 2000–01, 2010–11
  - Runners-up: 1974–75, 1978–79, 2003–04, 2008–09
- Johan Cruyff Shield
  - Winners: 2010, 2011
  - Runners-up: 2001

=== International ===
- UEFA Cup
  - Runners-up: 1974–75

== Domestic results ==
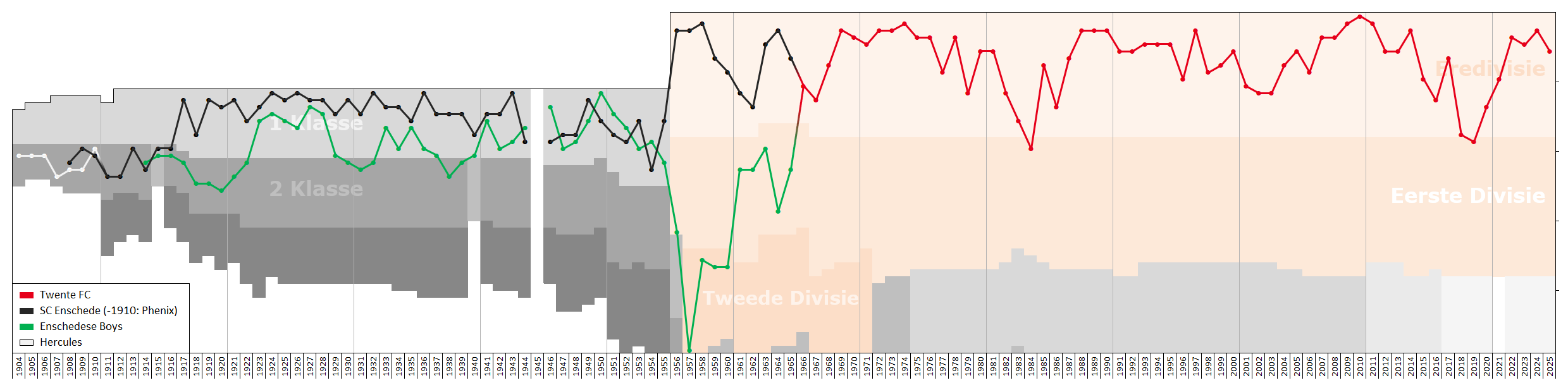
Historical chart of league performance

Below is a table with Twente's domestic results since the introduction of the Eredivisie in 1956.

Domestic results since 1956
Domestic league	League result	Qualification to	KNVB Cup season	Cup result
2025–26 Eredivisie	4th	– Europa League (2Q)	2025–26	quarter final
2024–25 Eredivisie	6th	– (losing CL play-offs)	2024–25	round of 16
2023–24 Eredivisie	3rd	Europa League (league stage)	2023–24	second round
2022–23 Eredivisie	5th	Europa Conference League (2Q)	2022–23	round of 16
2021–22 Eredivisie	4th	Europa Conference League (3Q)	2021–22	round of 16
2020–21 Eredivisie	10th	–	2020–21	first round
2019–20 Eredivisie	14th	–	2019–20	second round
2018–19 Eerste Divisie	1st	Eredivisie (promotion)	2018–19	quarter-final
2017–18 Eredivisie	18th (relegation)	–	2017–18	semi-final
2016–17 Eredivisie	7th	–	2016–17	second round
2015–16 Eredivisie	13th	–	2015–16	second round
2014–15 Eredivisie	10th	–	2014–15	semi-final
2013–14 Eredivisie	3rd	Europa League (Q4)	2013–14	second round
2012–13 Eredivisie	6th	– (losing EL play-offs)	2012–13	round of 16
2011–12 Eredivisie	6th	Europa League (Q1)	2011–12	round of 16
2010–11 Eredivisie	2nd	Champions League (Q2)	2010–11	winners
2009–10 Eredivisie	1st	Champions League	2009–10	semi-final
2008–09 Eredivisie	2nd	Champions League (Q2)	2008–09	final
2007–08 Eredivisie	4th	Champions League (winning CL play-offs) (Q3)	2007–08	second round
2006–07 Eredivisie	4th	UEFA Cup (after losing CL play-offs)	2006–07	round of 16
2005–06 Eredivisie	9th	Intertoto Cup (after losing UC play-offs final)	2005–06	round of 16
2004–05 Eredivisie	6th	–	2004–05	round of 16
2003–04 Eredivisie	8th	–	2003–04	final
2002–03 Eredivisie	12th	–	2002–03	second round
2001–02 Eredivisie	12th	–	2001–02	round of 16
2000–01 Eredivisie	11th	UEFA Cup	2000–01	winners
1999–2000 Eredivisie	6th	–	1999–2000	second round
1998–99 Eredivisie	8th	–	1998–99	round of 16
1997–98 Eredivisie	9th	Intertoto Cup	1997–98	4th place
1996–97 Eredivisie	3rd	UEFA Cup	1996–97	round of 16
1995–96 Eredivisie	10th	–	1995–96	quarter-final
1994–95 Eredivisie	5th	–	1994–95	round of 16
1993–94 Eredivisie	5th	UEFA Cup	1993–94	round of 16
1992–93 Eredivisie	5th	UEFA Cup	1992–93	quarter-final
1991–92 Eredivisie	6th	–	1991–92	third round
1990–91 Eredivisie	6th	–	1990–91	second round
1989–90 Eredivisie	3rd	UEFA Cup	1989–90	round of 16
1988–89 Eredivisie	3rd	UEFA Cup	1988–89	round of 16
1987–88 Eredivisie	3rd	(after losing UC play-offs)	1987–88	second round
1986–87 Eredivisie	7th	(after losing UC play-offs)	1986–87	round of 16
1985–86 Eredivisie	14th	–	1985–86	second round
1984–85 Eredivisie	8th	–	1984–85	round of 16
1983–84 Eerste Divisie	2nd	Eredivisie (promotion)	1983–84	quarter-final
1982–83 Eredivisie	16th	Eerste Divisie (relegation)	1982–83	round of 16
1981–82 Eredivisie	12th	–	1981–82	round of 16
1980–81 Eredivisie	6th	–	1980–81	round of 16
1979–80 Eredivisie	6th	UEFA Cup	1979–80	round of 16
1978–79 Eredivisie	12th	Cup Winners' Cup	1978–79	final
1977–78 Eredivisie	4th	UEFA Cup	1977–78	second round
1976–77 Eredivisie	9th	Cup Winners' Cup	1976–77	winners
1975–76 Eredivisie	4th	–	1975–76	round of 16
1974–75 Eredivisie	4th	–	1974–75	final
1973–74 Eredivisie	2nd	UEFA Cup	1973–74	round of 16
1972–73 Eredivisie	3rd	UEFA Cup	1972–73	quarter-final
1971–72 Eredivisie	3rd	UEFA Cup	1971–72	first round
1970–71 Eredivisie	5th	–	1970–71	round of 16
1969–70 Eredivisie	4th	Inter-Cities Fairs Cup	1969–70	semi-final
1968–69 Eredivisie	3rd	Inter-Cities Fairs Cup	1968–69	round of 16
1967–68 Eredivisie	8th	–	1967–68	semi-final
1966–67 Eredivisie	13th	–	1966–67	first round
1965–66 Eredivisie	11th	–	1965–66	group stage
1964–65 Eredivisie (as SC Enschede); 1964–65 Eerste Divisie (as Enschedese Boys)	7th 7th	–	1964–65	second round quarter final
1963–64 Eredivisie (as SC Enschede); 1963–64 Eerste Divisie (as Enschedese Boys)	3rd 13th	–	1963–64	second round first round
1962–63 Eredivisie (as SC Enschede); 1962–63 Eerste Divisie (as Enschedese Boys)	5th 4th	–	1962–63	quarter-final second round
1961–62 Eredivisie (as SC Enschede); 1961–62 Eerste Divisie (as Enschedese Boys)	14th 5th (group B)	–	1961–62	? ?
1960–61 Eredivisie (as SC Enschede); 1960–61 Eerste Divisie (as Enschedese Boys)	12th 5th (group A)	–	1960–61	? ?
1959–60 Eredivisie (as SC Enschede); 1959–60 Tweede Divisie (as Enschedese Boys)	9th 2nd (group B)	– Eerste Divisie (promotion)	not held	not held
1958–59 Eredivisie (as SC Enschede); 1958–59 Tweede Divisie (as Enschedese Boys)	7th 3rd (group B)	–	1958–59	? ?
1957–58 Eredivisie (as SC Enschede); 1957–58 Tweede Divisie (as Enschedese Boys)	2nd 2nd (group B)	–	1957–58	? ?
1956–57 Eredivisie (as SC Enschede); 1956–57 Tweede Divisie (as Enschedese Boys)	3rd 15th (group A)	–	1956–57	? ?

== Club staff ==
Position	Name
Head Coach	John van den Brom
Assistant Coach	Jeffrey de Visscher; Tristan Berghuis; Luc Stolker
Goalkeeper Coach	Eric Weghorst
Fitness Coach	Ellery Cairo
Chief Scout	Michel Doesburg
Scout	Niels Wigbold; Lee Mayes; André Paus
Chief Youth Scout	Koen Fleer
Youth Scout	Jan Kemkens
Director of Youth Department	Carsten Herzog
Coordinator of Talent Management	Bas van Baar
Technical Director	Erik ten Hag

== Coaches ==
- (Austria) Friedrich Donenfeld (1 July 1965 – 30 June 1966)
- (Netherlands) Kees Rijvers (1 July 1966 – 30 June 1972)
- (Luxembourg) Spitz Kohn (1 July 1972 – 30 September 1979)
- (Netherlands) Hennie Hollink (1980–81)
- (Netherlands) Rob Groener (1981–82)
- (Luxembourg) Spitz Kohn (1 November 1982 – 30 June 1983)
- (Germany) Fritz Korbach (1 July 1983 – 30 June 1986)
- (Netherlands) Theo Vonk (1 July 1986 – 30 June 1992)
- (Netherlands) Rob Baan (1 July 1992 – 30 June 1994)
- (Netherlands) Issy ten Donkelaar (1 July 1994 – 19 November 1995)
- (Netherlands) Fred Rutten (interim) (16 November 1995 – 15 January 1996)
- (Germany) Hans Meyer (15 January 1996 – 5 September 1999)
- (Netherlands) Fred Rutten (6 September 1999 – 30 June 2001)
- (Netherlands) John van 't Schip (1 July 2001 – 10 July 2002)
- (Belgium) René Vandereycken (24 July 2002 – 17 May 2004)
- (Netherlands) Rini Coolen (1 July 2004 – 1 February 2006)
- (Netherlands) Jan van Staa (interim) (1 February 2006 – 30 June 2006)
- (Netherlands) Fred Rutten (1 July 2006 – 30 June 2008)
- (England) Steve McClaren (20 June 2008 – 30 June 2010)
- (Belgium) Michel Preud'homme (1 July 2010 – 30 June 2011)
- (Netherlands) Co Adriaanse (1 July 2011 – 3 January 2012)
- (England) Steve McClaren (5 January 2012 – 26 February 2013)
- (Netherlands) Alfred Schreuder (interim) (26 February 2013 – 1 April 2013)
- (Netherlands) Michel Jansen (interim) (1 April 2013 – 30 June 2014)
- (Netherlands) Alfred Schreuder (1 July 2014 – 31 August 2015)
- (Netherlands) René Hake (31 August 2015 – 18 October 2017)
- (Bosnia and Herzegovina) Marino Pušić (interim) (18 October 2017 – 29 October 2017)
- (Netherlands) Gertjan Verbeek (29 October 2017 – 26 March 2018)
- (Bosnia and Herzegovina) Marino Pušić (26 March 2018 – 31 May 2019)
- (Spain) Gonzalo Recoba (1 July 2019 – 1 June 2020)
- (Netherlands) Ron Jans (17 June 2020 – 11 June 2023)
- (Netherlands) Joseph Oosting (1 July 2023 – 4 September 2025)
- (Netherlands) John van den Brom (15 September 2025 – present)

== Notable (former) players ==
The players below had senior international cap(s) for their respective countries. Players whose name is listed in bold represented their countries while playing for FC Twente.

- (Albania) **Lindon Selahi**
- (Algeria) **Ramiz Zerrouki**
- (Austria) **Marko Arnautović**
- (Austria) **Marc Janko**
- (Austria) Roland Kollmann
- (Australia) David Carney
- (Australia) Jason Čulina
- (Australia) Nikita Rukavytsya
- (Australia) Luke Wilkshire
- (Belgium) Dedryck Boyata
- (Belgium) Jurgen Cavens
- (Belgium) **Nacer Chadli**
- (Belgium) Stein Huysegems
- (Belgium) Frédéric Peiremans
- (Brazil) **Danilo**
- (Bulgaria) **Nikolay Mihaylov**
- (Burkina Faso) Rahim Ouédraogo
- (Chile) Cristian Cuevas
- (Chile) **Felipe Gutiérrez**
- (Costa Rica) **Bryan Ruiz**
- (Croatia) Dario Vujičević
- (Czech Republic) **Václav Černý**
- (Denmark) Hans Aabech
- (Denmark) Michael Birkedal
- (Denmark) Andreas Bjelland
- (Denmark) Kasper Kusk
- (Denmark) Claus Nielsen
- (Denmark) Kenneth Perez
- (Denmark) Jan Sørensen
- (Denmark) Per Steffensen
- (Finland) Përparim Hetemaj
- (Finland) **Fredrik Jensen**
- (Finland) Mika Lipponen
- (Finland) Antti Sumiala
- (Germany) Helmut Rahn
- (Germany) Peter Niemeyer
- (Germany) Rico Steinmann
- (Georgia (country)) **Giorgi Aburjania**
- (Georgia (country)) Giorgi Gakhokidze
- (Ghana) Prince Polley
- (Greece) Konstantinos Loumpoutis
- (Hungary) Antal Nagy
- (Iceland) Arnar Viðarsson
- (Iraq) Nashat Akram
- (Ivory Coast) **Cheick Tioté**
- (Indonesia) Calvin Verdonk
- (Indonesia) Joey Pelupessy
- (Indonesia) Mees Hilgers
- (Japan) Ryo Miyaichi
- (Luxembourg) Spitz Kohn
- (Mexico) **Jesús Corona**
- (Montenegro) Luka Đorđević
- (Morocco) Karim El Ahmadi
- (Morocco) Ismaïl Aissati
- (Morocco) Faouzi El Brazi
- (Morocco) Anouar Diba
- (Morocco) Adil Ramzi
- (Morocco) Hakim Ziyech
- (Netherlands) Otman Bakkal
- (Netherlands) Ronald de Boer
- (Netherlands) **Sander Boschker**
- (Netherlands) John Bosman
- (Netherlands) Paul Bosvelt
- (Netherlands) Edson Braafheid
- (Netherlands) **Wout Brama**
- (Netherlands) Arnold Bruggink
- (Netherlands) Romano Denneboom
- (Netherlands) **Epi Drost**
- (Netherlands) Eljero Elia
- (Netherlands) Orlando Engelaar
- (Netherlands) Leroy Fer
- (Netherlands) Erik ten Hag
- (Netherlands) Kees van Ierssel
- (Netherlands) **Theo Janssen**
- (Netherlands) Collins John
- (Netherlands) Ola John
- (Netherlands) **Luuk de Jong**
- (Netherlands) René van de Kerkhof
- (Netherlands) Willy van de Kerkhof
- (Netherlands) Denny Landzaat
- (Netherlands) Adam Maher
- (Netherlands) Andy van der Meyde
- (Netherlands) Michael Mols
- (Netherlands) Arnold Mühren
- (Netherlands) Youri Mulder
- (Netherlands) René Notten
- (Netherlands) Arthur Numan
- (Netherlands) Heini Otto
- (Netherlands) Niels Oude Kamphuis
- (Netherlands) Theo Pahlplatz
- (Netherlands) Tijjani Reijnders
- (Netherlands) Marcel Peeper
- (Netherlands) Quincy Promes
- (Netherlands) **Fred Rutten**
- (Netherlands) Dick Schoenaker
- (Netherlands) Theo Snelders
- (Netherlands) Frans Thijssen
- (Netherlands) Kick van der Vall
- (Netherlands) Dwight Tiendalli
- (Netherlands) Orlando Trustfull
- (Netherlands) **Jan Vennegoor of Hesselink**
- (Netherlands) Paul Verhaegh
- (Netherlands) Sander Westerveld
- (Netherlands) **Peter Wisgerhof**
- (Nigeria) **Tyronne Ebuehi**
- (Norway) Hallvar Thoresen
- (Peru) **Renato Tapia**
- (Poland) Przemysław Tytoń
- (Poland) Mateusz Klich
- (Portugal) Daniel Fernandes
- (Russia) Dmitri Bulykin
- (Scotland) Scott Booth
- (Serbia) Slobodan Rajković
- (Serbia) **Dušan Tadić**
- (Slovakia) Miroslav Stoch
- (Slovenia) **Haris Vučkić**
- (South Africa) **Kamohelo Mokotjo**
- (South Africa) Bernard Parker
- (Sweden) Emir Bajrami
- (Sweden) Kennedy Bakırcıoğlu
- (Sweden) Rasmus Bengtsson
- (Sweden) Daniel Majstorović
- (Sweden) Sharbel Touma
- (Switzerland) **Blaise Nkufo**
- (United States) Oguchi Onyewu
- (Venezuela) **Roberto Rosales**
- (Socialist Federal Republic of Yugoslavia) Zvonko Bego
- (Socialist Federal Republic of Yugoslavia) Spira Grujić
- (Socialist Federal Republic of Yugoslavia) Mitar Mrkela
- (Socialist Federal Republic of Yugoslavia) Spasoje Samardžić

== Top scorers ==
Season	Name	Goals
1965–66	(Netherlands) Hans Roordink	11
1966–67	(Netherlands) Jan Jeuring	10
1967–68	(Netherlands) Dick van Dijk	22
1968–69	(Netherlands) Dick van Dijk	30
1969–70	(Hungary) Antal Nagy	17
1970–71	(Netherlands) Jan Jeuring	17
1971–72	(Netherlands) René van de Kerkhof	10
1972–73	(Netherlands) Jan Jeuring	13
1973–74	(Netherlands) Johan Zuidema	14
1974–75	(Netherlands) Johan Zuidema	10
1975–76	(Netherlands) Jan Jeuring	20
1976–77	(Netherlands) Arnold Mühren	13
1977–78	(Netherlands) Ab Gritter	15
1978–79	(Netherlands) Ab Gritter	14
1979–80	(Norway) Hallvar Thoresen	11
1980–81	(Norway) Hallvar Thoresen	15
1981–82	(Spain) Manuel Sánchez Torres	15
1982–83	(Netherlands) Martin Koopman	7
1983–84	(England) Billy Ashcroft	21
1984–85	(Netherlands) Willy Carbo	15
1985–86	(Netherlands) Martin Koopman	8
1986–87	(Netherlands) Ulrich Wilson	8
1987–88	(Netherlands) Piet Keur	17
1988–89	(Netherlands) Piet Keur	16
1989–90	(Denmark) Claus Nielsen	14
1990–91	(Denmark) Claus Nielsen	16
1991–92	(Netherlands) Youri Mulder	18
1992–93	(Ghana) Prince Polley	11

Season	Name	Goals
1994–95	(Netherlands) Michel Boerebach	12
1993–94	(Netherlands) Edwin Vurens	10
1995–96	(Netherlands) Arnold Bruggink	11
1996–97	(Netherlands) John Bosman	20
1997–98	(Netherlands) John Bosman (Netherlands) Jan van Halst (Finland) Antti Sumiala	6
1998–99	(Netherlands) Jan Vennegoor of Hesselink	21
1999–00	(Netherlands) Jan Vennegoor of Hesselink	19
2000–01	(Netherlands) Jan Vennegoor of Hesselink	15
2001–02	(Netherlands) Jack de Gier	6
2002–03	(Netherlands) Ellery Cairo	7
2003–04	(Switzerland) Blaise Nkufo	14
2004–05	(Switzerland) Blaise Nkufo	16
2005–06	(Switzerland) Blaise Nkufo	12
2006–07	(Switzerland) Blaise Nkufo	22
2007–08	(Switzerland) Blaise Nkufo	22
2008–09	(Switzerland) Blaise Nkufo	16
2009–10	(Costa Rica) Bryan Ruiz	24
2010–11	(Austria) Marc Janko	15
2011–12	(Netherlands) Luuk de Jong	25
2012–13	(Netherlands) Luc Castaignos	13
2013–14	(Serbia) Dušan Tadić	16
2014–15	(Morocco) Hakim Ziyech	11
2015–16	(Morocco) Hakim Ziyech	17
2016–17	(Turkey) Enes Ünal	18
2017–18	(Morocco) Oussama Assaidi	6
2018–19	(Spain) Aitor Cantalapiedra	16
2019–20	(Slovenia) Haris Vuckic	11
2020–21	(Brazil) Danilo Pereira da Silva	17
2021–22	(Netherlands) Ricky van Wolfswinkel	16
2022–23	(Czech Republic) Václav Černý	14
2023–24	(Netherlands) Sem Steijn	17
2024–25	(Netherlands) Sem Steijn	24
2025–26	(Iceland) Kristian Hlynsson	10

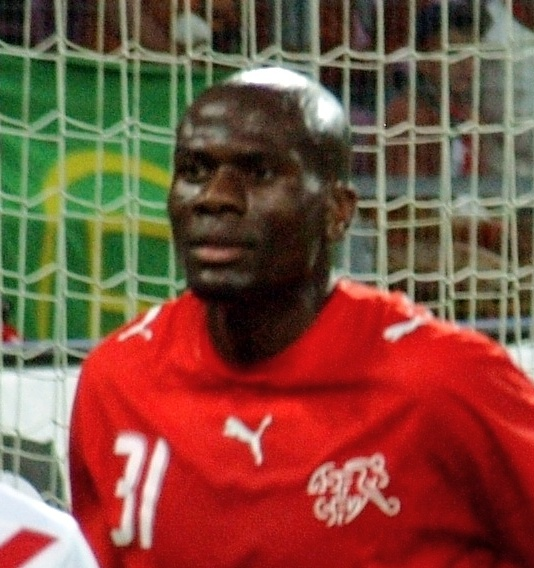
Blaise Nkufo, with 114 goals, is the club's all-time top scorer.

== Women's section ==
The women's section of Twente was founded in 2007 for the creation of the Eredivisie as new top-level league in the Netherlands. Twente played the opening match of the league. After three midfield positions in the first three years, Twente won the championship in 2010–11 and played the UEFA Women's Champions League in 2011–12.

== See also ==
- List of football clubs in the Netherlands
- Derby of Twente
- Jong FC Twente
- FC Twente in European football
