= 1974–75 KNVB Cup =

Tournament details
- Country: Netherlands
- Teams: 46

Final positions
- Champions: FC Den Haag
- Runners-up: FC Twente

The 1974-75 KNVB Cup was the 57th edition of the Dutch national football annual knockout tournament for the KNVB Cup. 46 teams contested, beginning in October 1974 and ending at the final on 15 May 1975.

PSV unsuccessfully defended its 1974 title in the Round of 16 losing to FC Wageningen, 3–2. FC Den Haag successfully pursued on 15 May 1975 in De Kuip, Rotterdam its second KNVB Cup defeating FC Twente, 1–0. 21,000 attended. FC Den Haag previously lifted the cup in 1968.

== Teams ==
- All 18 participants of the Eredivisie 1974-75, entering in the second round
- All 19 participants of the Eerste Divisie 1974-75
- 9 teams from lower (amateur) leagues

== First round ==
The matches of the first round were played during October 1974.

| Home team | Result | Away team |
|---|---|---|
| IJsselmeervogels _{A} | 1–0 | SV Limburgia _{A} |
| NEC _{1} | 2–3 (aet) | FC Groningen _{1} |
| PEC Zwolle _{1} | 2–0 | SV Spakenburg _{A} |
| RBC _{A} | 1–0 (aet) | SC Veendam _{1} |
| SC Amersfoort _{1} | 2–1 | FC Eindhoven _{1} |
| SC Cambuur _{1} | (p) 1-1 | Willem II _{1} |
| Heracles _{1} | 7–2 | Quick 1888 _{A} |

| Home team | Result | Away team |
|---|---|---|
| FC Dordrecht _{1} | 2–1 | SVV _{1} |
| FC Vlaardingen _{1} | 1–0 (aet) | SV Huizen _{A} |
| FC VVV _{1} | 5–1 | Vitesse Arnhem _{1} |
| CVV Germanicus _{A} | 1–2 | FC Volendam _{1} |
| sc Heerenveen _{1} | 2–2 (p) | Fortuna SC _{1} |
| Helmond Sport _{1} | 1–0 | USV Elinkwijk _{A} |
| Hermes DVS _{A} | (p) 1-1 | FC Den Bosch _{1} |

_{1} Eerste Divisie; _{A} Amateur teams

== Second round ==
The matches of the second round were played on November 23 and 24, 1974. The Eredivisie clubs entered the tournament this round.

| Home team | Result | Away team |
|---|---|---|
| HFC Haarlem _{E} | 3–1 | De Graafschap _{E} |
| IJsselmeervogels | 4–1 | SC Amersfoort |
| MVV _{E} | 1–2 | Feyenoord _{E} |
| RBC | 0–4 | PSV _{E} |
| Roda JC _{E} | 2–1 | FC Amsterdam _{E} |
| Telstar _{E} | 2–0 | Hermes DVS |
| FC Volendam | 2–1 | NAC _{E} |
| FC Wageningen _{E} | 5–1 | PEC Zwolle |

| Home team | Result | Away team |
|---|---|---|
| Ajax _{E} | 8–0 | Helmond Sport |
| AZ'67 _{E} | 2–0 | FC VVV |
| Excelsior _{E} | 0–1 | Heracles |
| FC Den Haag _{E} | (p) 1-1 | SC Cambuur |
| FC Dordrecht | 1–2 | Sparta _{E} |
| FC Vlaardingen | 1–2 | FC Groningen |
| Fortuna Sittard | 1–2 | FC Twente _{E} |
| Go Ahead Eagles _{E} | 0–1 | FC Utrecht _{E} |

_{E} Eredivisie

== Round of 16 ==
The matches of the round of 16 were played on December 29, 1974, and February 8 and 9, 1975.

| Home team | Result | Away team |
|---|---|---|
| AZ'67 | 8–1 | Telstar |
| FC Den Haag | (p) 0-0 | Roda JC |
| FC Twente | 2–0 | Feyenoord |
| IJsselmeervogels | 2–1 | FC Groningen |
| Heracles | 4–2 (aet) | Ajax |
| Sparta | 2–1 | FC Utrecht |
| FC Volendam | 3–1 | HFC Haarlem |
| FC Wageningen | 3–2 | PSV |

== Quarter finals ==
The quarter finals were played on March 12, 1975.

| Home team | Result | Away team |
|---|---|---|
| AZ'67 | 2–2 (p) | IJsselmeervogels |
| FC Den Haag | 1–0 | Sparta |
| FC Twente | 4–0 | FC Volendam |
| FC Wageningen | 2–1 | Heracles |

== Semi-finals ==
The semi-finals were played on April 16, 1975.

| Home team | Result | Away team |
|---|---|---|
| FC Den Haag | 1–0 | FC Wageningen |
| IJsselmeervogels | 0–6 | FC Twente |

== Final ==
15 May 1975

| FC Den Haag | 1–0 | FC Twente |
|---|---|---|
| van Leeuwen 67' |

De Kuip, Rotterdam
Attendance: 21,000
Referee: Frans Derks

FC Den Haag would participate in the Cup Winners' Cup.
