= 1976–77 KNVB Cup =

Tournament details
- Country: Netherlands
- Teams: 46

Final positions
- Champions: FC Twente
- Runners-up: PEC Zwolle

The 1976-77 KNVB Cup was the 59th edition of the Dutch national football annual knockout tournament for the KNVB Cup. 46 teams contested, beginning on 10 October 1976 and ending at the final on 19 May 1977.

PSV unsuccessfully defended its 1976 title in the Quarter finals on 9 March 1977 losing to FC Den Haag (Penalty shootout (association football)), 1-1. FC Twente successfully pursued on 19 May 1977 its first KNVB Cup in De Goffert, Nijmegen defeating PEC Zwolle, 3–0 (after extra time). 26,000 attended. FC Twente contested in the Cup Winners' Cup.

== Teams ==
- All 18 participants of the Eredivisie 1976-77, entering in the second round
- All 19 participants of the Eerste Divisie 1976-77
- 9 teams from lower (amateur) leagues

== First round ==
The matches of the first round were played on 10 October 1976.

Home team	Result	Away team
Heracles _{1}	0–1	CVV Germanicus _{A}
MVV _{1}	6–0	IJsselmeervogels _{A}
RKC _{A}	3–3 (p)	PEC Zwolle _{1}
SC Veendam _{1}	1–2	FC Den Bosch _{1}
Vitesse Arnhem _{1}	10–0	RVC '33 _{A}
FC Volendam _{1}	2–4	FC Wageningen _{1}
Willem II _{1}	(p) 0-0	SC Cambuur _{1}

Home team	Result	Away team
De Zwervers _{A}	2–1	VV Noordwijk _{A}
Excelsior _{1}	3–2 (aet)	SC Amersfoort _{1}
FC Dordrecht _{1}	1–0	BSV Limburgia _{A}
FC Vlaardingen _{1}	2–4 (aet)	FC Groningen _{1}
Fortuna SC _{1}	4–2 (aet)	CVV Rotterdam _{A}
sc Heerenveen _{1}	2–1 (aet)	VV Rheden _{A}
Helmond Sport _{1}	0–2	SVV _{1}

_{1} Eerste Divisie; _{A} Amateur teams

== Second round ==
The matches of the second round were played on November 21, 1976. The Eredivisie clubs entered the tournament this round.

Home team	Result	Away team
HFC Haarlem _{E}	0–2	Roda JC _{E}
MVV	4–1	De Zwervers
NAC _{E}	1–0	sc Heerenveen
PEC Zwolle	2–0	FC Dordrecht
PSV _{E}	1–0	Fortuna SC
SVV	1–1 (p)	Willem II
Telstar _{E}	3–1	Vitesse Arnhem
FC Wageningen	6–1	CVV Germanicus

Home team	Result	Away team
AZ'67 _{E}	1–0 (aet)	Sparta _{E}
FC Amsterdam _{E}	0–0 (p)	Excelsior
FC Den Bosch	0–0 (p)	FC Groningen
FC Den Haag _{E}	3–0	FC VVV _{E}
FC Twente _{E}	2–1	Go Ahead Eagles _{E}
FC Utrecht _{E}	2–1	Ajax _{E}
Feyenoord _{E}	1–0 (aet)	FC Eindhoven _{E}
De Graafschap _{E}	2–0	NEC _{E}

_{E} Eredivisie

== Round of 16 ==
The matches of the round of 16 were played between 16 and 20 February 1977.

Home team	Result	Away team
FC Den Haag	(p) 1-1	Excelsior
FC Twente	1–0	Feyenoord
FC Utrecht	0–1	FC Groningen
De Graafschap	1–2 (aet)	NAC
MVV	2–1	Willem II
PEC Zwolle	2–1 (aet)	Telstar
PSV	3–2	FC Wageningen
Roda JC	0–1 (aet)	AZ'67

== Quarter finals ==
The quarter finals were played on 9 March 1977.

Home team	Result	Away team
FC Den Haag	(p) 1-1	PSV
FC Groningen	1–2 (aet)	AZ'67
FC Twente	1–0	NAC
PEC Zwolle	1–0	MVV

== Semi-finals ==
The semi-finals were played on 27 April 1977.

Home team	Result	Away team
FC Twente	1–0 (aet)	AZ'67 (played at Den Bosch)
PEC Zwolle	2–1 (aet)	FC Den Haag (played at Utrecht)

== Final ==
19 May 1977

FC Twente	3–0 (a.e.t.)	PEC Zwolle
Drost 95'; Mühren 105' (pen.); Jeuring 110'

De Goffert, Nijmegen
Attendance: 26,000
Referee: Cees de Bruin

FC Twente would play in the Cup Winners' Cup.
