= 1974–75 UEFA Cup =

4th season of Europe's secondary club football tournament organised by UEFA

Tournament details
- Dates: 11 September 1974 – 21 May 1975
- Teams: 64

Final positions
- Champions: (West Germany) Borussia Mönchengladbach (1st title)
- Runners-up: (Netherlands) Twente

Tournament statistics
- Matches played: 124
- Goals scored: 388 (3.13 per match)
- Attendance: 1,987,332 (16,027 per match)
- Top scorer(s): Jupp Heynckes (Borussia Mönchengladbach); 11 goals

The 1974–75 UEFA Cup was the fourth season of the UEFA Cup, the third-tier club football competition organised by UEFA.

The final was played over two legs at the Rheinstadion, Düsseldorf, West Germany, and at the Diekman Stadion, Enschede, the Netherlands. It was won by Borussia Mönchengladbach of West Germany, who defeated FC Twente of the Netherlands by an aggregate result of 5–1 to claim their first UEFA Cup title.

No team from West Germany had ever won the UEFA Cup, or its unofficial predecessor Inter-Cities Fairs Cup before Borussia's first conquest, which came two years after reaching the final in 1973. In that edition, both teams had already faced in the semi-finals, which ended with the same aggregate score. For the first time since the 1966 edition of the Inter-Cities Fairs Cup, no English team reached the final.

== Association team allocation ==
A total of 63 teams from 30 UEFA member associations participate in the 1974–75 UEFA Cup. The original allocation scheme was as follows:

- 3 associations have four teams qualify.
- 3 associations have three teams qualify.
- 18 associations have two teams qualify.
- 6 associations have one team qualify.

The Netherlands and Austria were the two associations selected to have an extra third birth for this season, while Scotland and Belgium went back to two qualified teams.

Associations in the 1974–75 UEFA Cup

Four teams
England
Italy
West Germany
Three teams
Netherlands
Spain
Austria

Two teams
Hungary	Scotland	East Germany
Poland	Portugal	Belgium
Czechoslovakia	(Socialist Federal Republic of Yugoslavia) Yugoslavia	Soviet Union
Romania	Greece	Turkey
Bulgaria	Sweden	Denmark
France	Switzerland	Norway

One team
Republic of Ireland
Finland
Malta
Luxembourg
Northern Ireland
Iceland

Did not compete
Wales
Albania
Cyprus

Wales: There was no national league in Wales before 1992 and the only competition organised by the Football Association of Wales was the Welsh Cup so Wales had just a single participant in European competitions, the winner (or best placed Welsh team as several English teams also competed) of the Welsh Cup which competed in the UEFA Cup Winners' Cup.
Albania: Albanian teams were absent from European competition from 1973 to 1978 due to the international isolation of the country during the communist rule of Enver Hoxha. Partizani would have qualified for the UEFA Cup by league position.
Cyprus: Due to the Turkish invasion of Cyprus, which took place during the summer of 1974, all Cypriot teams withdrew from European competitions after the first round draws were held.

=== Teams ===
The labels in the parentheses show how each team qualified for competition:

- TH: Title holders
- CW: Cup winners
- CR: Cup runners-up
- LC: League Cup winners
- 2nd, 3rd, 4th, 5th, 6th, etc.: League position
- P-W: End-of-season European competition play-offs winners

Qualified teams for 1974–75 UEFA Cup
(England) Derby County (3rd)	(England) Ipswich Town (4th)	(England) Stoke City (5th)	(England) Wolverhampton Wanderers (LC)
(Italy) Juventus (2nd)	(Italy) Napoli (3rd)	(Italy) Inter Milan (4th)	(Italy) Torino (5th)
(West Germany) Borussia Mönchengladbach (2nd)	(West Germany) Fortuna Düsseldorf (3rd)	(West Germany) Köln (5th)	(West Germany) Hamburg (CR)
(Netherlands) Twente (2nd)	(Netherlands) Ajax (3rd)	(Netherlands) FC Amsterdam (5th)	(Spain) Atlético Madrid (2nd)
(Spain) Zaragoza (3rd)	(Spain) Real Sociedad (4th)	(Austria) Wacker Innsbruck (2nd)	(Austria) Rapid Wien (3rd)
(Austria) Sturm Graz (5th)	(Hungary) Raba ETO Győr (2nd)	(Hungary) Videoton (3rd)	(Scotland) Hibernian (2nd)
(Scotland) Dundee (LC)	(East Germany) Dynamo Dresden (2nd)	(East Germany) Vorwärts Frankfurt (3rd)	(Poland) Górnik Zabrze (2nd)
(Poland) Legia Warsaw (4th)	(Portugal) Vitória de Setúbal (3rd)	(Portugal) Porto (4th)	(Belgium) Antwerp (2nd)
(Belgium) Molenbeek (3rd)	(Czechoslovakia) Dukla Prague (2nd)	(Czechoslovakia) Baník Ostrava (4th)	(Socialist Federal Republic of Yugoslavia) Velež (2nd)
(Socialist Federal Republic of Yugoslavia) Partizan (4th)	(Soviet Union) Dynamo Moscow (3rd)	(Soviet Union) Spartak Moscow (4th)	(Romania) Dinamo București (2nd)
(Romania) Steagul Roşu Brașov (3rd)	(Greece) Panathinaikos (2nd)	(Greece) Aris (3rd)	(Turkey) Beşiktaş (2nd)
(Turkey) Boluspor (3rd)	(Bulgaria) Lokomotiv Plovdiv (3rd)	(Bulgaria) Etar Veliko Tarnovo (4th)	(Sweden) Öster (2nd)
(Sweden) Djurgården (3rd)	(Denmark) Randers (2nd)	(Denmark) KB (3rd)	(France) Nantes (2nd)
(France) Lyon (3rd)	(Switzerland) Grasshoppers (2nd)	(Switzerland) Servette (3rd)	(Norway) Rosenborg (2nd)
(Norway) Start (3rd)	(Republic of Ireland) Bohemians (2nd)	(Finland) KPV Kokkola (2nd)	(Malta) Hibernians (2nd)
(Luxembourg) Red Boys Differdange (2nd)	(Northern Ireland) Portadown (2nd)	(Iceland) Valur (2nd)	(Cyprus) Pezoporikos Larnaca (2nd)

Notes

1. West Germany: The fourth UEFA Cup spot for West Germany was not awarded to the fourth best team not qualified for the European Cup or the European Cup Winners' Cup, which was Kaiserslautern, as it was common practice. Instead, this place was awarded to Hamburg, who had been runners-up in the 1973–74 DFB-Pokal.
2. Poland: All spots for European competition were decided with three matchdays left in the league, which was interrupted at that point due to the scheduling of the 1974 FIFA World Cup. As the third-placed team at the time of matchday 27, Legia Warsaw earned the second UEFA Cup spot, but it would later finish fourth behind Stal Mielec.
3. Cyprus: Pezoporikos Larnaca had already been drawn in the UEFA Cup against Dukla Prague before the mass withdrawal of all Cypriot teams, as a result of the Turkish invasion of Cyprus. The match-up was declared as a walk-over win for Dukla Prague.

== Schedule ==
The schedule of the competition was as follows. Matches were scheduled for Wednesdays, though some matches took place on Tuesdays and Thursdays. In the first round, both legs of the match-up between FC Amsterdam and Hibernians F.C. were played over five days in the Netherlands, with the second leg being held on a Sunday

Schedule for 1974–75 UEFA Cup
Round	First leg	Second leg
First round	11–19 September 1974	22 September – 3 October 1974
Second round	22–23 October 1974	5–13 November 1974
Third round	27 November 1974	11 December 1974
Quarter-finals	5 March 1975	19 March 1975
Semi-finals	9–10 April 1975	22–23 April 1975
Final	7 May 1975	21 May 1975

== First round ==
Team 1	Agg.	Team 2	1st leg	2nd leg
Lyon (France)	11–1	(Luxembourg) Red Boys Differdange	7–0	4–1
Valur (Iceland)	1–2	(Northern Ireland) Portadown	0–0	1–2
Derby County (England)	6–2	(Switzerland) Servette	4–1	2–1
Ipswich Town (England)	3–3 (a)	(Netherlands) Twente	2–2	1–1
Stoke City (England)	1–1 (a)	(Netherlands) Ajax	1–1	0–0
RWD Molenbeek (Belgium)	5–2	(Scotland) Dundee	1–0	4–2
Rosenborg (Norway)	3–12	(Scotland) Hibernian	2–3	1–9
Porto (Portugal)	5–4	(England) Wolverhampton Wanderers	4–1	1–3
Etar (Bulgaria)	0–3	(Italy) Inter Milan	0–0	0–3
Górnik Zabrze (Poland)	2–5	(Socialist Federal Republic of Yugoslavia) Partizan	2–2	0–3
Start (Norway)	1–7	(Sweden) Djurgården	1–2	0–5
Boluspor (Turkey)	0–4	(Romania) Dinamo București	0–1	0–3
Spartak Moscow (Soviet Union)	3–3 (a)	(Socialist Federal Republic of Yugoslavia) Velež Mostar	3–1	0–2
Beşiktaş (Turkey)	2–3	(Romania) Steagul Roșu Brașov	2–0	0–3
Wacker Innsbruck (Austria)	2–4	(West Germany) Borussia Mönchengladbach	2–1	0–3
Sturm Graz (Austria)	2–2 (a)	(Belgium) Royal Antwerp	2–1	0–1
Randers (Denmark)	1–1 (a)	(East Germany) Dynamo Dresden	1–1	0–0
Hamburg (West Germany)	4–0	(Republic of Ireland) Bohemians	3–0	1–0
Rapid Wien (Austria)	3–2	(Greece) Aris	3–1	0–1
Real Sociedad (Spain)	0–5	(Czechoslovakia) Baník Ostrava	0–1	0–4
Lokomotiv Plovdiv (Bulgaria)	4–4 (4–5 p)	(Hungary) Raba ETO Győr	3–1	1–3
Öster (Sweden)	4–4 (a)	(Soviet Union) Dynamo Moscow	3–2	1–2
Nantes (France)	3–2	(Poland) Legia Warsaw	2–2	1–0
Napoli (Italy)	3–1	(Hungary) Videoton	2–0	1–1
Vorwärts Frankfurt (East Germany)	2–4	(Italy) Juventus	2–1	0–3
Grasshoppers (Switzerland)	3–2	(Greece) Panathinaikos	2–0	1–2
Torino (Italy)	2–4	(West Germany) Fortuna Düsseldorf	1–1	1–3
Köln (West Germany)	9–2	(Finland) KPV	5–1	4–1
Amsterdam (Netherlands)	12–0	(Malta) Hibernians	5–0	7–0
KB (Denmark)	3–6	(Spain) Atlético Madrid	3–2	0–4
Vitória de Setúbal (Portugal)	1–5	(Spain) Zaragoza	1–1	0–4
Dukla Prague (Czech Republic)	(w/o)	(Cyprus) Pezoporikos Larnaca	—	—

=== First leg ===
17 September 1974

Lyon (France)	7–0	(Luxembourg) Red Boys Differdange
Maillard 10', 68', 77'; Lacombe 23', 33', 34'; Maneiro 53'	Report

Stade de Gerland, Lyon
Attendance: 6,172
Referee: Roland Racine (Switzerland)

17 September 1974

Valur (Iceland)	0–0	(Northern Ireland) Portadown
	Report

Laugardalsvöllur, Reykjavík
Attendance: 5,062
Referee: Antoine Queudeville (Luxembourg)

18 September 1974

Derby County (England)	4–1	(Switzerland) Servette
Hector 14', 47'; Daniel 38'; Lee 44'	Report	Petrović 71'

Baseball Ground, Derby
Attendance: 17,716
Referee: Antonio Rigo Sureda (Spain)

18 September 1974

Ipswich Town (England)	2–2	(Netherlands) Twente
Hamilton 34'; Talbot 38'	Report	Zuidema 23'; Pahlplatz 83'

Portman Road, Ipswich
Attendance: 28,155
Referee: Hans-Joachim Weyland (West Germany)

18 September 1974

Stoke City (England)	1–1	(Netherlands) Ajax
Smith 78'	Report	Krol 27'

Victoria Ground, Stoke-on-Trent
Attendance: 37,145
Referee: Alberto Michelotti (Italy)

18 September 1974

RWD Molenbeek (Belgium)	1–0	(Scotland) Dundee
Wellens 88'	Report

Edmond Machtens Stadium, Brussels
Attendance: 9,850
Referee: César Correia (Portugal)

18 September 1974

Rosenborg (Norway)	2–3	(Scotland) Hibernian
Iversen 60', 89'	Report	Stanton 18'; Gordon 37'; Cropley 59'

Lerkendal Stadion, Trondheim
Attendance: 6,537
Referee: Jan Peeters (Belgium)

18 September 1974

Porto (Portugal)	4–1	(England) Wolverhampton Wanderers
McAlle 3' (o.g.); Cubillas 37'; Flávio Minuano 41'; Gomes 69'	Report	Bailey 63'

Estádio das Antas, Porto
Attendance: 21,909
Referee: Robert Héliès (France)

18 September 1974

Etar (Bulgaria)	0–0	(Italy) Inter Milan
	Report

Stadion Ivaylo, Veliko Tarnovo
Attendance: 13,119
Referee: Hilmi Ok (Turkey)

18 September 1974

Górnik Zabrze (Poland)	2–2	(Socialist Federal Republic of Yugoslavia) Partizan
Kurzeja 57'; Kwaśny 68'	Report	Zavišić 72'; Vukotić 86'

Stadion Miejski, Zabrze
Attendance: 18,774
Referee: Károly Palotai (Hungary)

18 September 1974

Start (Norway)	1–2	(Sweden) Djurgården
Mathisen 82'	Report	Svensson 17'; Skotte 54'

Kristiansand Stadion, Kristiansand
Attendance: 4,100
Referee: Preben Christophersen (Denmark)

18 September 1974

Boluspor (Turkey)	0–1	(Romania) Dinamo București
	Report	Nunweiller 35'

Bolu Atatürk Stadium, Bolu
Attendance: 2,116
Referee: Giulio Ciacci (Italy)

18 September 1974

Spartak Moscow (Soviet Union)	3–1	(Socialist Federal Republic of Yugoslavia) Velež Mostar
Piskaryov 26'; Gladilin 34'; Lovchev 50'	Report	Bajević 38'

Luzhniki Stadium, Moscow
Attendance: 8,924
Referee: Miroslav Živný (Czechoslovakia)

18 September 1974

Beşiktaş (Turkey)	2–0	(Romania) Steagul Roșu Brașov
Sarıalioğlu 63'; Özan 89'	Report

İnönü Stadium, Istanbul
Attendance: 12,157
Referee: Vladimir Rudniev (Soviet Union)

18 September 1974

Wacker Innsbruck (Austria)	2–1	(West Germany) Borussia Mönchengladbach
Flindt Bjerg 53', 55'	Report	Heynckes 62'

Tivoli, Innsbruck
Attendance: 16,000
Referee: Jozef Korček (Czechoslovakia)

18 September 1974

Sturm Graz (Austria)	2–1	(Belgium) Royal Antwerp
Stendal 30'; Kulmer 65'	Report	Heyligen 78'

Gruabn, Graz
Attendance: 4,369
Referee: Petar Nikolov (Bulgaria)

18 September 1974

Randers (Denmark)	1–1	(East Germany) Dynamo Dresden
Nielsen 69'	Report	Dörner 32'

Randers Stadium, Randers
Attendance: 2,612
Referee: Bob Matthewson (England)

18 September 1974

Hamburg (West Germany)	3–0	(Republic of Ireland) Bohemians
Volkert 24' (pen.) 31'; Kaltz 68'	Report

Volksparkstadion, Hamburg
Attendance: 9,293
Referee: Clive Thomas (Wales)

18 September 1974

Rapid Wien (Austria)	3–1	(Greece) Aris
Pajenk 55'; Ritter 83'; Krankl 89'	Report	Alexiadis 88'

Ernst-Happel-Stadion, Vienna
Attendance: 11,974
Referee: Jan Łazowski (Poland)

18 September 1974

Real Sociedad (Spain)	0–1	(Czechoslovakia) Baník Ostrava
	Report	Mička 62'

Atotxa Stadium, San Sebastián
Attendance: 28,069
Referee: Robert Schaut (Belgium)

18 September 1974

Lokomotiv Plovdiv (Bulgaria)	3–1	(Hungary) Raba ETO Győr
Kurbanov 43'; Bonev 46'; Kyuchukov 80'	Report	Glázer 24'

Stadion Lokomotiv, Plovdiv
Attendance: 15,000
Referee: Costas Xanthoulis (Cyprus)

18 September 1974

Öster (Sweden)	3–2	(Soviet Union) Dynamo Moscow
Mattsson 13', 31'; Nordenberg 74' (pen.)	Report	Kozlov 34'; Pavlenko 39'

Värendsvallen, Växjö
Attendance: 5,398
Referee: William Gow (Wales)

18 September 1974

Nantes (France)	2–2	(Poland) Legia Warsaw
Ćmikiewicz 66' (o.g.); Michel 69' (pen.)	Report	Białas 18'; Pieszko 50'

Stade Marcel Saupin, Nantes
Attendance: 13,156
Referee: Ismael Baltasar (Portugal)

18 September 1974

Napoli (Italy)	2–0	(Hungary) Videoton
Massa 46'; Pogliana 72'	Report

Stadio San Paolo, Naples
Attendance: 48,681
Referee: Paul Bonett (Malta)

18 September 1974

Vorwärts Frankfurt (East Germany)	2–1	(Italy) Juventus
Schuth 3'; Krautzig 74'	Report	Capello 8'

Stadion der Freundschaft, Frankfurt an der Oder
Attendance: 16,255
Referee: Charles Corver (Netherlands)

18 September 1974

Grasshoppers (Switzerland)	2–0	(Greece) Panathinaikos
Elsener 2'; Grahn 83'	Report

Hardturm, Zürich
Attendance: 8,200
Referee: Zdeněk Jelínek (Czechoslovakia)

18 September 1974

Torino (Italy)	1–1	(West Germany) Fortuna Düsseldorf
Pulici 27'	Report	Zewe 56'

Stadio Olimpico Grande Torino, Turin
Attendance: 28,296
Referee: Robert Wurtz (France)

18 September 1974

Köln (West Germany)	5–1	(Finland) KPV
Löhr 1'; D. Müller 12', 25'; Overath 33'; Flohe 84'	Report	Mäkelä 48'

Müngersdorfer Stadion, Cologne
Attendance: 5,000
Referee: Norbert Rolles (Luxembourg)

18 September 1974

Amsterdam (Netherlands)	5–0	(Malta) Hibernians
Husers 5'; Jansen 46', 48'; Koopman 80'; Otto 88'	Report

Olympic Stadium, Amsterdam
Attendance: 3,007
Referee: Iorwerth Jones (Wales)

19 September 1974

KB (Denmark)	3–2	(Spain) Atlético Madrid
Sørensen 6'; Holmstrøm 48'; Bernbrug 53'	Report	Ayala 44'; Salcedo 49'

Frederiksberg Idrætspark, Frederiksberg
Attendance: 16,400
Referee: Rolf Nyhus (Norway)

11 September 1974

Vitória de Setúbal (Portugal)	1–1	(Spain) Zaragoza
Belmondo 34'	Report	Arrúa 85'

Estádio do Bonfim, Setúbal
Attendance: 6,375
Referee: Bobby Davidson (Scotland)

=== Second leg ===
2 October 1974

Red Boys Differdange (Luxembourg)	1–4	(France) Lyon
Christophe 16'	Report	Domenech 13', 25'; Maneiro 33'; Lacombe 65'

Stade Municipal de la Ville de Differdange, Differdange
Attendance: 589
Referee: Frans Derks (Netherlands)

Lyon won 11–1 on aggregate.

1 October 1974

Portadown (Northern Ireland)	2–1	(Iceland) Valur
McFall 59'; Morrison 77' (pen.)	Report	Albertsson 73'

Shamrock Park, Portadown
Attendance: 6,000
Referee: Joop Vervoort (Netherlands)

Portadown won 2–1 on aggregate.

2 October 1974

Servette (Switzerland)	1–2	(England) Derby County
Martin 19'	Report	Lee 46'; Hector 72'

Charmilles Stadium, Geneva
Attendance: 9,590
Referee: Franz Wöhrer (Austria)

Derby County won 6–2 on aggregate.

2 October 1974

Twente (Netherlands)	1–1	(England) Ipswich Town
Bos 7'	Report	Hamilton 14'

Diekman Stadion, Enschede
Attendance: 16,358
Referee: Paul Schiller (Austria)

3–3 on aggregate, Twente won on away goals rule.

2 October 1974

Ajax (Netherlands)	0–0	(England) Stoke City
	Report

Olympic Stadium, Amsterdam
Attendance: 19,020
Referee: Nicolae Rainea (Romania)

1–1 on aggregate, Ajax won on away goals rule.

2 October 1974

Dundee (Scotland)	2–4	(Belgium) RWD Molenbeek
Duncan 12'; Scott 51'	Report	Teugels 33'; Boskamp 39'; Wellens 70'; Koens 88'

Dens Park, Dundee
Attendance: 9,709
Referee: Heinz Einbeck (East Germany)

RWD Molenbeek won 5–2 on aggregate.

2 October 1974

Hibernian (Scotland)	9–1	(Norway) Rosenborg
Harper 19', 22'; Munro 20', 33'; Stanton 37', 85'; Cropley 61' (pen.), 80' (pen.); Gordon 69'	Report	Iversen 16'

Easter Road, Edinburgh
Attendance: 12,379
Referee: Guðmundur Haraldsson (Iceland)

Hibernian won 12–3 on aggregate.

2 October 1974

Wolverhampton Wanderers (England)	3–1	(Portugal) Porto
Bailey 3'; Daley 46'; Dougan 79'	Report	Cubillas 37'

Molineux Stadium, Wolverhampton
Attendance: 15,924
Referee: Adolf Prokop (East Germany)

Porto won 5–4 on aggregate.

2 October 1974

Inter Milan (Italy)	3–0	(Bulgaria) Etar
Oriali 32'; Boninsegna 51', 89' (pen.)	Report

San Siro, Milan
Attendance: 19,778
Referee: Pablo Sánchez Ibáñez (Spain)

Inter Milan won 3–0 on aggregate.

1 October 1974

Partizan (Socialist Federal Republic of Yugoslavia)	3–0	(Poland) Górnik Zabrze
Vukotić 21'; Đorđević 79'; Todorović 89'	Report

Partizan Stadium, Belgrade
Attendance: 4,000
Referee: Nikola Dudin (Bulgaria)

Partizan won 5–2 on aggregate.

2 October 1974

Djurgården (Sweden)	5–0	(Norway) Start
Samuelsson 63'; Stenbäck 65'; Karlsson 70', 88'; Skotte 87'	Report

Stockholm Olympic Stadium, Stockholm
Attendance: 322
Referee: Marian Środecki (Poland)

Djurgården won 7–1 on aggregate.

2 October 1974

Dinamo București (Romania)	3–0	(Turkey) Boluspor
Dinu 37'; Dumitrache 48'; Lucescu 85'	Report

Stadionul Dinamo, Bucharest
Attendance: 8,100
Referee: Marian Kustoń (Poland)

Dinamo București won 4–0 on aggregate.

2 October 1974

Velež Mostar (Socialist Federal Republic of Yugoslavia)	2–0	(Soviet Union) Spartak Moscow
Čolić 53'; Topić 85'	Report

Stadion pod Bijelim Brijegom, Mostar
Attendance: 4,672
Referee: Nicolae Petriceanu (Romania)

3–3 on aggregate, Velež Mostar won on away goals rule.

2 October 1974

Steagul Roșu Brașov (Romania)	3–0	(Turkey) Beşiktaş
Kadar 86'; Șerbănoiu 87', 89'	Report

Stadionul Tineretului, Brașov
Attendance: 9,515
Referee: Mitko Chukov (Bulgaria)

Steagul Roșu Brașov won 3–2 on aggregate.

2 October 1974

Borussia Mönchengladbach (West Germany)	3–0	(Austria) Wacker Innsbruck
Vogts 11'; Heynckes 66'; Jensen 70'	Report

Bökelbergstadion, Mönchengladbach
Attendance: 17,041
Referee: Ernst Dörflinger (Switzerland)

Borussia Mönchengladbach won 4–2 on aggregate.

2 October 1974

Royal Antwerp (Belgium)	1–0	(Austria) Sturm Graz
Kodat 12'	Report

Bosuilstadion, Antwerp
Attendance: 8,903
Referee: John Homewood (England)

2–2 on aggregate, Royal Antwerp won on away goal rules.

2 October 1974

Dynamo Dresden (East Germany)	0–0	(Denmark) Randers
	Report

Rudolf-Harbig-Stadion, Dresden
Attendance: 13,762
Referee: Ian Foote (Scotland)

1–1 on aggregate, Dynamo Dresden won on away goal rules.

2 October 1974

Bohemians (Republic of Ireland)	0–1	(West Germany) Hamburg
	Report	Bertl 87'

Dalymount Park, Dublin
Attendance: 3,300
Referee: Jean Bancourt (France)

Hamburg won 4–0 on aggregate.

2 October 1974

Aris (Greece)	1–0	(Austria) Rapid Wien
Alexiadis 54'	Report

Toumba Stadium, Thessaloniki
Attendance: 14,153
Referee: Anatoli Ivanov (Soviet Union)

Rapid Wien won 3–2 on aggregate.

2 October 1974

Baník Ostrava (Czechoslovakia)	4–0	(Spain) Real Sociedad
Vojáček 10'; Slaný 52'; Albrecht 70'; Kolečko 84'	Report

Bazaly, Ostrava
Attendance: 7,242
Referee: Milos Cajić (Yugoslavia)

Baník Ostrava won 5–0 on aggregate.

2 October 1974

Raba ETO Győr (Hungary)	3–1 (a.e.t.)	(Bulgaria) Lokomotiv Plovdiv
Sebők 24'; Pénzes 25'; Glázer 28'	Report	Kichekov 4'
Penalties
Stolcz (penalty scored); Pozsgai (penalty missed); Somogyi (penalty scored); Glázer (penalty scored); Horváth (penalty scored); Sebők (penalty scored)	5–4	(penalty missed) Kamburov; (penalty scored) Bonev; (penalty scored) Dimitrov; (penalty scored) Kichekov; (penalty scored) Georgiev; (penalty missed) Stamboliev

Stadion ETO, Győr
Attendance: 8,773
Referee: Jack Taylor (England)

4–4 on aggregate, Raba ETO Győr won 5–4 in penalty shoot-out.

2 October 1974

Dynamo Moscow (Soviet Union)	2–1	(Sweden) Öster
Yevryuzhikhin 13'; Petrushin 69'	Report	Svensson 48' (pen.)

Central Dynamo Stadium, Moscow
Attendance: 14,155
Referee: Anders Mattsson (Finland)

4–4 on aggregate, Dynamo Moscow won on away goals rule.

2 October 1974

Legia Warsaw (Poland)	0–1	(France) Nantes
	Report	Rampillon 65'

Stadion Wojska Polskiego, Warsaw
Attendance: 4,767
Referee: Rolf Haugen (Norway)

Nantes won 3–2 on aggregate.

2 October 1974

Videoton (Hungary)	1–1	(Italy) Napoli
Wollek 9'	Report	Braglia 18'

Sóstói Stadion, Székesfehérvár
Attendance: 6,486
Referee: Rudolf Frickel (West Germany)

Napoli won 3–1 on aggregate.

2 October 1974

Juventus (Italy)	3–0	(East Germany) Vorwärts Frankfurt
Anastasi 17'; Hause 34' (o.g.); Altafini 83'	Report

Stadio Comunale, Turin
Attendance: 44,914
Referee: Ken Burns (England)

Juventus won 4–2 on aggregate.

3 October 1974

Panathinaikos (Greece)	2–1	(Switzerland) Grasshoppers
Antoniadis 74', 82'	Report	Santrač 8'

Leoforos Alexandras Stadium, Athens
Attendance: 13,070
Referee: Gheorge Limona (Romania)

Grasshopper won 3–2 on aggregate.

25 September 1974

Fortuna Düsseldorf (West Germany)	3–1	(Italy) Torino
Zimmermann 10'; Seel 21'; Geye 73' (pen.)	Report	Agroppi 19'

Rheinstadion, Düsseldorf
Attendance: 22,252
Referee: Franz Geluck (Belgium)

Fortuna Düsseldorf won 4–2 on aggregate.

2 October 1974

KPV (Finland)	1–4	(West Germany) Köln
Lamberg 75'	Report	Neumann 50'; Löhr 60' (pen.); Simmet 85', 88'

Kokkolan keskuskenttä, Kokkola
Attendance: 3,000
Referee: Bent Nielsen (Denmark)

Köln won 9–2 on aggregate.

22 September 1974

Hibernians (Malta)	0–7	(Netherlands) Amsterdam
	Report	Fransz 17'; Husers 29'; Dekker 47'; Jansen 49', 56'; Karte 53', 75'

Olympic Stadium, Amsterdam
Attendance: 1,593
Referee: Walter Eschweiler (West Germany)

Both legs were played in Amsterdam, the second leg was formally a 'home' game for Hibernians. Amsterdam won 12–0 on aggregate.

2 October 1974

Atlético Madrid (Spain)	4–0	(Denmark) KB
Leal 44'; Irureta 51', 60'; Gárate 78'	Report

Vicente Calderón Stadium, Madrid
Attendance: 32,469
Referee: Tony Briguglio (Malta)

Atlético Madrid won 6–3 on aggregate.

2 October 1974

Zaragoza (Spain)	4–0	(Portugal) Vitória de Setúbal
Arrúa 14'; Diarte 51'; García Castany 65'; Leirós 73'	Report

La Romareda, Zaragoza
Attendance: 22,000
Referee: Vittorio Lattanzi (Italy)

Zaragoza won 5–1 on aggregate.

== Second round ==
Team 1	Agg.	Team 2	1st leg	2nd leg
Derby County (England)	4–4 (7–6 p)	(Spain) Atlético Madrid	2–2	2–2 (a.e.t.)
Hibernian (Scotland)	2–8	(Italy) Juventus	2–4	0–4
Partizan (Socialist Federal Republic of Yugoslavia)	6–1	(Northern Ireland) Portadown	5–0	1–1
Nantes (France)	1–2	(Czechoslovakia) Baník Ostrava	1–0	0–2 (a.e.t.)
Dinamo București (Romania)	3–4	(West Germany) Köln	1–1	2–3
Raba ETO Győr (Hungary)	2–3	(West Germany) Fortuna Düsseldorf	2–0	0–3
Rapid Wien (Austria)	1–2	(Socialist Federal Republic of Yugoslavia) Velež Mostar	1–1	0–1
Dynamo Dresden (East Germany)	1–1 (4–3 p)	(Soviet Union) Dynamo Moscow	1–0	0–1 (a.e.t.)
Grasshoppers (Switzerland)	2–6	(Spain) Zaragoza	2–1	0–5
Borussia Mönchengladbach (West Germany)	6–2	(France) Lyon	1–0	5–2
Hamburg (West Germany)	10–1	(Romania) Steagul Roșu Brașov	8–0	2–1
Twente (Netherlands)	3–1	(Belgium) RWD Molenbeek	2–1	1–0
Djurgården (Sweden)	1–5	(Czechoslovakia) Dukla Prague	0–2	1–3
Inter Milan (Italy)	1–2	(Netherlands) Amsterdam	1–2	0–0
Napoli (Italy)	2–0	(Portugal) Porto	1–0	1–0
Ajax (Netherlands)	2–2 (a)	(Belgium) Royal Antwerp	1–0	1–2

=== First leg ===
23 October 1974

Derby County (England)	2–2	(Spain) Atlético Madrid
Nish 15'; Rioch 85' (pen.)	Report	Ayala 13'; Aragonés 77' (pen.)

Baseball Ground, Derby
Attendance: 25,347
Referee: Robert Héliès (France)

23 October 1974

Hibernian (Scotland)	2–4	(Italy) Juventus
Stanton 58'; Cropley 64'	Report	Gentile 44'; Altafini 69', 87'; Cuccureddu 79'

Easter Road, Edinburgh
Attendance: 28,963
Referee: Jean Dubach (Switzerland)

23 October 1974

Partizan (Socialist Federal Republic of Yugoslavia)	5–0	(Northern Ireland) Portadown
Kozić 24', 63'; Zavišić 35'; Nikolić 79'; Vukotić 89'	Report

Partizan Stadium, Belgrade
Attendance: 3,994
Referee: Giorgos Katsoras (Greece)

23 October 1974

Nantes (France)	1–0	(Czechoslovakia) Baník Ostrava
Bossis 19'	Report

Stade Marcel Saupin, Nantes
Attendance: 10,439
Referee: Josef Bucek (Austria)

23 October 1974

Dinamo București (Romania)	1–1	(West Germany) Köln
Dinu 65'	Report	Lauscher 41'

Stadionul Dinamo, Bucharest
Attendance: 15,000
Referee: Michael Kitabdjian (France)

23 October 1974

Rába ETO Győr (Hungary)	2–0	(West Germany) Fortuna Düsseldorf
Varsányi 43'; Stolcz 61'	Report

Stadion ETO, Győr
Attendance: 15,000
Referee: Roland Racine (Switzerland)

23 October 1974

Rapid Wien (Austria)	1–1	(Socialist Federal Republic of Yugoslavia) Velež Mostar
Ritter 89'	Report	Halilhodžić 66'

Pfarrwiese, Vienna
Attendance: 4,684
Referee: Nicolae Rainea (Romania)

23 October 1974

Dynamo Dresden (East Germany)	1–0	(Soviet Union) Dynamo Moscow
Sachse 11'	Report

Rudolf-Harbig-Stadion, Dresden
Attendance: 9,884
Referee: Tsvetan Stanev (Bulgaria)

23 October 1974

Grasshoppers (Switzerland)	2–1	(Spain) Zaragoza
Grahn 31'; Santrač 89'	Report	Arrúa 54'

Hardturm, Zürich
Attendance: 6,500
Referee: Heinz Einbeck (East Germany)

22 October 1974

Borussia Mönchengladbach (West Germany)	1–0	(France) Lyon
Simonsen 8'	Report

Bökelbergstadion, Mönchengladbach
Attendance: 4,769
Referee: Marijan Raus (Yugoslavia)

23 October 1974

Hamburg (West Germany)	8–0	(Romania) Steagul Roșu Brașov
Zaczyk 18'; Memering 37'; Volkert 49', 82' (pen.); Bertl 54'; Nagy 71' (o.g.); Ripp 77'; Krobbach 90'	Report

Volksparkstadion, Hamburg
Attendance: 7,344
Referee: Malcolm Wright (Northern Ireland)

23 October 1974

Twente (Netherlands)	2–1	(Belgium) RWD Molenbeek
Thijssen 20'; Van der Vall 89'	Report	Koens 27'

Diekman Stadion, Enschede
Attendance: 14,519
Referee: Michal Jursa (Czechoslovakia)

23 October 1974

Djurgården (Sweden)	0–2	(Czechoslovakia) Dukla Prague
	Report	Nehoda 55'; Gajdůšek 70'

Stockholm Olympic Stadium, Stockholm
Attendance: 728
Referee: Ian Foote (Scotland)

23 October 1974

Inter Milan (Italy)	1–2	(Netherlands) Amsterdam
Boninsegna 73'	Report	Jansen 6', 38'

San Siro, Milan
Attendance: 19,281
Referee: Jack Taylor (England)

23 October 1974

Napoli (Italy)	1–0	(Portugal) Porto
Orlandini 51'	Report

Stadio San Paolo, Naples
Attendance: 32,805
Referee: Ángel Franco Martínez (Spain)

23 October 1974

Ajax (Netherlands)	1–0	(Belgium) Royal Antwerp
Mühren 86'	Report

Olympic Stadium, Amsterdam
Attendance: 10,988
Referee: Thomas Reynolds (Wales)

=== Second leg ===
6 November 1974

Atlético Madrid (Spain)	2–2 (a.e.t.)	(England) Derby County
Aragonés 4', 75'	Report	Rioch 54'; Hector 63'
Penalties
Aragonés (penalty scored); Ayala (penalty scored); Salcedo (penalty scored); Capón (penalty missed); Irureta (penalty scored); Benegas (penalty scored); Gárate (penalty scored); Bejarano (penalty missed)	6–7	(penalty scored) Rioch; (penalty scored) Hector; (penalty missed) Davies; (penalty scored) Nish; (penalty scored) Lee; (penalty scored) Gemmill; (penalty scored) Newton; (penalty scored) Powell

Vicente Calderón Stadium, Madrid
Attendance: 38,973
Referee: Ferdinand Biwersi (West Germany)

4–4 on aggregate, Derby County won 7–6 in penalty shoot-out.

6 November 1974

Juventus (Italy)	4–0	(Scotland) Hibernian
Bettega 9'; Anastasi 58', 83'; Altafini 74'	Report

Stadio Olimpico Grande Torino, Turin
Attendance: 17,989
Referee: Walter Eschweiler (West Germany)

Juventus won 8–2 on aggregate.

6 November 1974

Portadown (Northern Ireland)	1–1	(Socialist Federal Republic of Yugoslavia) Partizan
Malcolmson 28'	Report	Todorović 62'

Shamrock Park, Portadown
Attendance: 1,908
Referee: Preben Christophersen (Denmark)

Partizan won 6–1 on aggregate.

6 November 1974

Baník Ostrava (Czechoslovakia)	2–0 (a.e.t.)	(France) Nantes
Klement 62', 118'	Report

Bazaly, Ostrava
Attendance: 6,367
Referee: Josef Bucek (Austria)

Baník Ostrava won 2–1 on aggregate.

5 November 1974

Köln (West Germany)	3–2	(Romania) Dinamo București
Overath 18'; Neumann 58'; Müller 73'	Report	Custov 3'; Georgescu 8'

Müngersdorfer Stadion, Cologne
Attendance: 14,246
Referee: Zdenìk Jelínek (Czechoslovakia)

Köln won 4–3 on aggregate.

5 November 1974

Fortuna Düsseldorf (West Germany)	3–0	(Hungary) Rába ETO Győr
Herzog 58' (pen.); Czernotzky 64'; Brücken 78'	Report

Rheinstadion, Düsseldorf
Attendance: 8,634
Referee: Gheorghi Bakanidze (Soviet Union)

Fortuna Düsseldorf won 3–2 on aggregate.

6 November 1974

Velež Mostar (Socialist Federal Republic of Yugoslavia)	1–0	(Austria) Rapid Wien
Hodžić 44'	Report

Stadion pod Bijelim Brijegom, Mostar
Attendance: 3,287
Referee: Vittorio Lattanzi (Italy)

Velež Mostar won 2–1 on aggregate.

6 November 1974

Dynamo Moscow (Soviet Union)	1–0 (a.e.t.)	(East Germany) Dynamo Dresden
Kurnenin 26'	Report
Penalties
Yevryuzhikhin (penalty scored); Yakubik (penalty scored); Makhovikov (penalty scored); Basalayev (penalty missed); Dolmatov (penalty missed)	3–4	(penalty scored) Wätzlich; (penalty scored) Dörner; (penalty scored) Kreische; (penalty missed) Sachse; (penalty scored) Kotte

Central Dynamo Stadium, Moscow
Attendance: 8,263
Referee: Sándor Petri (Hungary)

1–1 on aggregate, Dynamo Dresden won 4–3 in penalty shoot-out.

6 November 1974

Zaragoza (Spain)	5–0	(Switzerland) Grasshoppers
Rubial 12', 65'; Soto 20'; Ohlhauser 48' (o.g.); Niggl 88' (o.g.)	Report

La Romareda, Zaragoza
Attendance: 20,000
Referee: Theo Boosten (Netherlands)

Zaragoza won 6–2 on aggregate.

5 November 1974

Lyon (France)	2–5	(West Germany) Borussia Mönchengladbach
Valette 1'; Domenech 71'	Report	Bonhof 23', 50'; Simonsen 28', 89'; Kulik 64'

Stade de Gerland, Lyon
Attendance: 34,988
Referee: Antonio Camacho Jiménez (Spain)

Borussia Mönchengladbach won 6–2 on aggregate.

6 November 1974

Steagul Roșu Brașov (Romania)	1–2	(West Germany) Hamburg
Șerbănoiu 14' (pen.)	Report	Kaltz 45'; Bjørnmose 55'

Stadionul Tineretului, Brașov
Attendance: 12,000
Referee: Ertuğrul Dilek (Turkey)

Hamburg won 10–1 on aggregate.

6 November 1974

RWD Molenbeek (Belgium)	0–1	(Netherlands) Twente
	Report	Zuidema 50'

Edmond Machtens Stadium, Brussels
Attendance: 19,000
Referee: Bobby Davidson (Scotland)

Twente won 3–1 on aggregate.

6 November 1974

Dukla Prague (Czechoslovakia)	3–1	(Sweden) Djurgården
Nehoda 21', 47'; Macela 46'	Report	Svensson 8'

Stadion Juliska, Prague
Attendance: 1,238
Referee: Cesare Gussoni (Italy)

Dukla Prague won 5–1 on aggregate.

6 November 1974

Amsterdam (Netherlands)	0–0	(Italy) Inter Milan
	Report

Olympic Stadium, Amsterdam
Attendance: 8,667
Referee: Franz Wöhrer (Austria)

Amsterdam won 2–1 on aggregate.

6 November 1974

Porto (Portugal)	0–1	(Italy) Napoli
	Report	Clerici 77'

Estádio das Antas, Porto
Attendance: 27,241
Referee: Robert Schaut (Belgium)

Napoli won 2–0 on aggregate.

13 November 1974

Royal Antwerp (Belgium)	2–1	(Netherlands) Ajax
Kodat 40'; Riedl 61' (pen.)	Report	Geels 10'

Bosuilstadion, Antwerp
Attendance: 38,711
Referee: Hans-Joachim Weyland (West Germany)

2–2 on aggregate, Ajax won on away goals rule.

== Third round ==
Team 1	Agg.	Team 2	1st leg	2nd leg
Napoli (Italy)	1–3	(Czechoslovakia) Baník Ostrava	0–2	1–1
Hamburg (West Germany)	6–3	(East Germany) Dynamo Dresden	4–1	2–2
Dukla Prague (Czechoslovakia)	3–6	(Netherlands) Twente	3–1	0–5
Partizan (Socialist Federal Republic of Yugoslavia)	2–5	(West Germany) Köln	1–0	1–5
Borussia Mönchengladbach (West Germany)	9–2	(Spain) Zaragoza	5–0	4–2
Amsterdam (Netherlands)	5–1	(West Germany) Fortuna Düsseldorf	3–0	2–1
Juventus (Italy)	2–2 (a)	(Netherlands) Ajax	1–0	1–2
Derby County (England)	4–5	(Socialist Federal Republic of Yugoslavia) Velež Mostar	3–1	1–4

=== First leg ===
27 November 1974

Napoli (Italy)	0–2	(Czechoslovakia) Baník Ostrava
	Report	Albrecht 81'; Kolečko 83'

Stadio San Paolo, Naples
Attendance: 24,649
Referee: Gheorge Limona (Romania)

27 November 1974

Hamburg (West Germany)	4–1	(East Germany) Dynamo Dresden
Bjørnmose 6', 40'; Volkert 11'; Nogly 43'	Report	Schmuck 32'

Volksparkstadion, Hamburg
Attendance: 52,000
Referee: Jack Taylor (England)

27 November 1974

Dukla Prague (Czechoslovakia)	3–1	(Netherlands) Twente
Dvořák 9'; Krumich 22'; Nehoda 40'	Report	Notten 52'

Stadion Juliska, Prague
Attendance: 1,700
Referee: Walter Eschweiler (West Germany)

27 November 1974

Partizan (Socialist Federal Republic of Yugoslavia)	1–0	(West Germany) Köln
Vukotić 81'	Report

Partizan Stadium, Belgrade
Attendance: 16,000
Referee: Robert Schaut (Belgium)

27 November 1974

Borussia Mönchengladbach (West Germany)	5–0	(Spain) Zaragoza
Simonsen 8' (pen.), 32'; Heynckes 24', 76'; Bonhof 45'	Report

Bökelbergstadion, Mönchengladbach
Attendance: 14,000
Referee: Erik Axelryd (Sweden)

27 November 1974

Amsterdam (Netherlands)	3–0	(West Germany) Fortuna Düsseldorf
Husers 34', 63'; Kriegler 75' (o.g.)	Report

Olympic Stadium, Amsterdam
Attendance: 2,189
Referee: Ángel Franco Martínez (Spain)

27 November 1974

Juventus (Italy)	1–0	(Netherlands) Ajax
Damiani 19'	Report

Stadio Olimpico Grande Torino, Turin
Attendance: 54,025
Referee: Paul Schiller (Austria)

27 November 1974

Derby County (England)	3–1	(Socialist Federal Republic of Yugoslavia) Velež Mostar
Hinton 74'; Bourne 77', 85'	Report	Vladić 2'

Baseball Ground, Derby
Attendance: 26,131
Referee: Günter Männig (East Germany)

=== Second leg ===
11 December 1974

Baník Ostrava (Czechoslovakia)	1–1	(Italy) Napoli
Slaný 81'	Report	Ferradini 40'

Bazaly, Ostrava
Attendance: 14,236
Referee: Jean Dubach (Switzerland)

Baník Ostrava won 3–1 on aggregate.

11 December 1974

Dynamo Dresden (East Germany)	2–2	(West Germany) Hamburg
Dörner 16'; Häfner 56'	Report	Bertl 43', 45'

Rudolf-Harbig-Stadion, Dresden
Attendance: 32,000
Referee: Doğan Babacan (Turkey)

Hamburg won 6–3 on aggregate.

11 December 1974

Twente (Netherlands)	5–0	(Czechoslovakia) Dukla Prague
Zuidema 33', 71', 81'; Notten 43', 73'	Report

Diekman Stadion, Enschede
Attendance: 9,887
Referee: Gyula Emsberger (Hungary)

Twente won 6–3 on aggregate.

11 December 1974

Köln (West Germany)	5–1	(Socialist Federal Republic of Yugoslavia) Partizan
Overath 48'; Löhr 64'; Müller 66'; Glowacz 71'; Flohe 85'	Report	Kozić 73'

Müngersdorfer Stadion, Cologne
Attendance: 18,000
Referee: Vittorio Lattanzi (Italy)

Köln won 5–2 on aggregate.

11 December 1974

Zaragoza (Spain)	2–4	(West Germany) Borussia Mönchengladbach
Violeta 11'; Galdós 63'	Report	Simonsen 18'; Heynckes 20', 89'; Stielike 75'

La Romareda, Zaragoza
Attendance: 25,000
Referee: William Gow (Wales)

Borussia Mönchengladbach won 9–2 on aggregate.

11 December 1974

Fortuna Düsseldorf (West Germany)	1–2	(Netherlands) Amsterdam
Seel 12'	Report	Husers 37'; Jansen 81'

Rheinstadion, Düsseldorf
Attendance: 4,618
Referee: John Gordon (Scotland)

Amsterdam won 5–1 on aggregate.

11 December 1974

Ajax (Netherlands)	2–1	(Italy) Juventus
Blankenburg 14'; G. Mühren 89'	Report	Damiani 66' (pen.)

Olympic Stadium, Amsterdam
Attendance: 13,952
Referee: René Vigliani (France)

2–2 on aggregate; Juventus won on away goals.

11 December 1974

Velež Mostar (Socialist Federal Republic of Yugoslavia)	4–1	(England) Derby County
Primorac 14' (pen.); Pecelj 29'; Vladić 51'; Bajević 86' (pen.)	Report	Hector 58'

Stadion pod Bijelim Brijegom, Mostar
Attendance: 15,000
Referee: Charles Corver (Netherlands)

Velež Mostar won 5–4 on aggregate.

== Quarter-finals ==
Team 1	Agg.	Team 2	1st leg	2nd leg
Juventus (Italy)	2–0	(West Germany) Hamburg	2–0	0–0
Köln (West Germany)	8–3	(Netherlands) Amsterdam	5–1	3–2
Velež Mostar (Socialist Federal Republic of Yugoslavia)	1–2	(Netherlands) Twente	1–0	0–2
Baník Ostrava (Czechoslovakia)	1–4	(West Germany) Borussia Mönchengladbach	0–1	1–3

=== First leg ===
5 March 1975

Juventus (Italy)	2–0	(West Germany) Hamburg
Capello 3'; Viola 11'	Report

Stadio Olimpico Grande Torino, Turin
Attendance: 41,810
Referee: Nicolae Rainea (Romania)

5 March 1975

Köln (West Germany)	5–1	(Netherlands) Amsterdam
Flohe 1', 50' (pen.); Müller 63', 70', 77'	Report	Visser 31'

Müngersdorfer Stadion, Cologne
Attendance: 23,000
Referee: Marian Środecki (Poland)

5 March 1975

Velež Mostar (Socialist Federal Republic of Yugoslavia)	1–0	(Netherlands) Twente
Kvesić 66'	Report

Stadion pod Bijelim Brijegom, Mostar
Attendance: 12,000
Referee: Franz Wöhrer (Austria)

5 March 1975

Baník Ostrava (Czechoslovakia)	0–1	(West Germany) Borussia Mönchengladbach
	Report	Heynckes 51'

Bazaly, Ostrava
Attendance: 32,269
Referee: Robert Wurtz (France)

=== Second leg ===
19 March 1975

Hamburg (West Germany)	0–0	(Italy) Juventus
	Report

Volksparkstadion, Hamburg
Attendance: 59,405
Referee: Vital Loraux (Belgium)

Juventus won 2–0 on aggregate.

19 March 1975

Amsterdam (Netherlands)	2–3	(West Germany) Köln
Jansen 68', 71'	Report	Strack 27'; Müller 43'; Löhr 45'

Olympic Stadium, Amsterdam
Attendance: 4,145
Referee: Clive Thomas (Wales)

Köln won 8–3 on aggregate.

19 March 1975

Twente (Netherlands)	2–0	(Socialist Federal Republic of Yugoslavia) Velež Mostar
Zuidema 41'; Overweg 89'	Report

Diekman Stadion, Enschede
Attendance: 18,000
Referee: Antonio Camacho Jiménez (Spain)

Twente won 2–1 on aggregate.

19 March 1975

Borussia Mönchengladbach (West Germany)	3–1	(Czechoslovakia) Baník Ostrava
Mička 10' (o.g.); Heynckes 46'; Vogts 50'	Report	Hudeček 67'

Bökelbergstadion, Mönchengladbach
Attendance: 10,119
Referee: Rolf Nyhus (Norway)

Borussia Mönchengladbach won 4–1 on aggregate.

== Semi-finals ==
Team 1	Agg.	Team 2	1st leg	2nd leg
Twente (Netherlands)	4–1	(Italy) Juventus	3–1	1–0
Köln (West Germany)	1–4	(West Germany) Borussia Mönchengladbach	1–3	0–1

=== First leg ===
9 April 1975

Twente (Netherlands)	3–1	(Italy) Juventus
Jeuring 20'; Zuidema 59', 83'	Report	Altafini 64'

Diekman Stadion, Enschede
Attendance: 22,000
Referee: René Vigliani (France)

10 April 1975

Köln (West Germany)	1–3	(West Germany) Borussia Mönchengladbach
Löhr 52'	Report	Simonsen 23', 60'; Danner 35'

Müngersdorfer Stadion, Cologne
Attendance: 26,745
Referee: Bob Matthewson (England)

=== Second leg ===
23 April 1975

Juventus (Italy)	0–1	(Netherlands) Twente
	Report	Zuidema 10'

Stadio Olimpico Grande Torino, Turin
Attendance: 45,328
Referee: Rudi Glöckner (East Germany

Twente won 4–1 on aggregate.

22 April 1975

Borussia Mönchengladbach (West Germany)	1–0	(West Germany) Köln
Danner 48'	Report

Bökelbergstadion, Mönchengladbach
Attendance: 29,575
Referee: Milivoje Gugulović (Yugoslavia)

Borussia Mönchengladbach won 4–1 on aggregate.

== Final ==
=== First leg ===
7 May 1975

Borussia Mönchengladbach (West Germany)	0–0	(Netherlands) Twente
	Report

Rheinstadion, Düsseldorf
Attendance: 42,368
Referee: Károly Palotai (Hungary)

=== Second leg ===
21 May 1975

Twente (Netherlands)	1–5	(West Germany) Borussia Mönchengladbach
Drost 76'	Report	Simonsen 3', 87' (pen.); Heynckes 9', 50', 60'

Diekman Stadion, Enschede
Attendance: 21,767
Referee: Paul Schiller (Austria)

Borussia Mönchengladbach won 5–1 on aggregate.
