= 1973 in Soviet football =

Football in the Soviet Union
- Season: 1973

Men's football
- Top League: Ararat Yerevan
- First League: Chernomorets Odessa
- Second League: Uralmash Sverdlovsk
- Soviet Cup: Ararat Yerevan

The 1973 Soviet football championship was the 41st seasons of competitive football in the Soviet Union and the 35th among teams of sports societies and factories. Ararat Yerevan won the championship becoming the Soviet domestic champions for the first time.

== Honours ==
| Competition | Winner | Runner-up |
|---|---|---|
| Top League | Ararat Yerevan (1) | Dinamo Kiev |
| First League | Chernomorets Odessa (2) | Nistru Kishinev |
| Second League | Uralmash Sverdlovsk | Tavriya Simferopol |
| Soviet Cup | Ararat Yerevan (1) | Dinamo Kiev |

Notes = Number in parentheses is the times that club has won that honour. * indicates new record for competition

== Soviet Union football championship ==
=== Top League ===
| Pos | Team | Pld | W | PKW | PKL | L | GF | GA | GD | Pts | Qualification or relegation |
|---|---|---|---|---|---|---|---|---|---|---|---|
| 1 | (Armenian Soviet Socialist Republic) Ararat Yerevan (C) | 30 | 18 | 3 | 4 | 5 | 52 | 26 | +26 | 39 | Qualification for European Cup first round |
| 2 | (Ukrainian Soviet Socialist Republic) Dynamo Kyiv | 30 | 16 | 4 | 4 | 6 | 44 | 23 | +21 | 36 | Qualification for Cup Winners' Cup first round |
| 3 | (Russian Soviet Federative Socialist Republic) Dynamo Moscow | 30 | 13 | 7 | 3 | 7 | 43 | 30 | +13 | 33 | Qualification for UEFA Cup first round |
| 4 | (Russian Soviet Federative Socialist Republic) Spartak Moscow | 30 | 14 | 3 | 5 | 8 | 37 | 28 | +9 | 31 | Qualification for UEFA Cup first round |
| 5 | (Georgian Soviet Socialist Republic) Dinamo Tbilisi | 30 | 13 | 5 | 2 | 10 | 42 | 33 | +9 | 31 | |
| 6 | (Ukrainian Soviet Socialist Republic) Shakhtar Donetsk | 30 | 14 | 3 | 4 | 9 | 32 | 26 | +6 | 31 | |
| 7 | (Ukrainian Soviet Socialist Republic) Zarya Voroshilovgrad | 30 | 14 | 1 | 5 | 10 | 38 | 26 | +12 | 29 | |
| 8 | (Ukrainian Soviet Socialist Republic) Dnipro Dnipropetrovsk | 30 | 9 | 8 | 1 | 12 | 36 | 40 | −4 | 26 | |
| 9 | (Kazakh Soviet Socialist Republic) Kairat Alma-Ata | 30 | 8 | 10 | 1 | 11 | 25 | 37 | −12 | 26 | |
| 10 | (Russian Soviet Federative Socialist Republic) CSKA Moscow | 30 | 10 | 5 | 4 | 11 | 33 | 36 | −3 | 25 | |
| 11 | (Russian Soviet Federative Socialist Republic) Zenit Leningrad | 30 | 9 | 3 | 9 | 9 | 33 | 35 | −2 | 21 | |
| 12 | (Uzbek Soviet Socialist Republic) Pakhtakor Tashkent | 30 | 9 | 2 | 4 | 15 | 37 | 44 | −7 | 20 | |
| 13 | (Russian Soviet Federative Socialist Republic) Torpedo Moscow | 30 | 9 | 1 | 7 | 13 | 28 | 37 | −9 | 19 | |
| 14 | (Ukrainian Soviet Socialist Republic) Karpaty Lviv | 30 | 8 | 3 | 3 | 16 | 28 | 48 | −20 | 19 | |
| 15 | (Byelorussian Soviet Socialist Republic) Dinamo Minsk (R) | 30 | 7 | 3 | 6 | 14 | 21 | 36 | −15 | 17 | Relegation to First League |
| 16 | (Russian Soviet Federative Socialist Republic) SKA Rostov-on-Don (R) | 30 | 3 | 5 | 4 | 18 | 19 | 43 | −24 | 11 | Relegation to First League |

Rules for classification: Drawn matches decided by penalties, the winners obtaining 1 point, the losers 0.
(C) Champion; (R) Relegated

=== First League ===
| Pos | Rep | Team | Pld | W | PKW | PKL | L | GF | GA | GD | Pts | Promotion or relegation |
|---|---|---|---|---|---|---|---|---|---|---|---|---|
| 1 | UKR | Chernomorets Odessa | 38 | 24 | 4 | 2 | 8 | 83 | 38 | +45 | 52 | Promoted |
| 2 | MDA | Nistru Kishinev | 38 | 25 | 2 | 5 | 6 | 71 | 35 | +36 | 52 | Promoted |
| 3 | RUS | Lokomotiv Moskva | 38 | 20 | 6 | 2 | 10 | 47 | 32 | +15 | 46 | |
| 4 | AZE | Neftchi Baku | 38 | 17 | 5 | 3 | 13 | 58 | 43 | +15 | 39 | |
| 5 | RUS | Metallurg Lipetsk | 38 | 14 | 7 | 5 | 12 | 42 | 38 | +4 | 35 | |
| 6 | UKR | Metallurg Zaporozhye | 38 | 14 | 6 | 5 | 13 | 62 | 53 | +9 | 34 | |
| 7 | RUS | Shinnik Yaroslavl | 38 | 16 | 2 | 6 | 14 | 48 | 41 | +7 | 34 | |
| 8 | RUS | Krylya Sovetov Kuibyshev | 38 | 15 | 4 | 3 | 16 | 46 | 51 | −5 | 34 | |
| 9 | GEO | Torpedo Kutaisi | 38 | 16 | 2 | 2 | 18 | 40 | 46 | −6 | 34 | |
| 10 | UKR | Spartak Ivano-Frankovsk | 38 | 14 | 5 | 2 | 17 | 40 | 54 | −14 | 33 | |
| 11 | RUS | Zvezda Perm | 38 | 14 | 4 | 5 | 15 | 50 | 52 | −2 | 32 | |
| 12 | RUS | Textilshchik Ivanovo | 38 | 14 | 4 | 4 | 16 | 41 | 46 | −5 | 32 | |
| 13 | TKM | Stroitel Ashkhabad | 38 | 14 | 4 | 3 | 17 | 46 | 58 | −12 | 32 | |
| 14 | TJK | Pamir Dushanbe | 38 | 14 | 3 | 5 | 16 | 50 | 44 | +6 | 31 | |
| 15 | RUS | Kuzbass Kemerovo | 38 | 14 | 2 | 7 | 15 | 42 | 46 | −4 | 30 | |
| 16 | RUS | Spartak Nalchik (Note: Spartak Nalchik was called Avtomobilist.) | 38 | 12 | 6 | 2 | 18 | 46 | 61 | −15 | 30 | |
| 17 | RUS | Spartak Orjonikidze | 38 | 13 | 4 | 3 | 18 | 29 | 44 | −15 | 30 | |
| 18 | KAZ | Shakhtyor Karaganda | 38 | 12 | 4 | 5 | 17 | 42 | 60 | −18 | 28 | Relegated |
| 19 | UKR | Metallist Kharkov | 38 | 11 | 5 | 4 | 18 | 34 | 50 | −16 | 27 | Relegated |
| 20 | KGZ | Alga Frunze | 38 | 6 | 2 | 8 | 22 | 49 | 54 | −5 | 14 | Relegated |

Source: rsssf.com

=== Second League (finals) ===
[Nov 4-20, Sochi]

| Pos | Rep | Team | Pld | W | PKW | PKL | L | GF | GA | GD | Pts | Promotion |
|---|---|---|---|---|---|---|---|---|---|---|---|---|
| 1 | RUS | UralMash Sverdlovsk | 6 | 4 | 1 | 0 | 1 | 14 | 7 | +7 | 9 | Promoted |
| 2 | UKR | Tavria Simferopol | 6 | 4 | 0 | 1 | 1 | 13 | 5 | +8 | 8 | Promoted |
| 3 | RUS | Kuban Krasnodar | 6 | 2 | 3 | 1 | 0 | 11 | 4 | +7 | 7 | Promoted |
| 4 | RUS | Iskra Smolensk | 6 | 3 | 0 | 1 | 2 | 12 | 11 | +1 | 6 | |
| 5 | RUS | Spartak Kostroma | 6 | 3 | 0 | 0 | 3 | 9 | 14 | −5 | 6 | |
| 6 | RUS | Sibiryak Bratsk | 6 | 0 | 1 | 0 | 5 | 2 | 12 | −10 | 1 | |
| 7 | KAZ | Traktor Pavlodar | 6 | 0 | 0 | 2 | 4 | 4 | 12 | −8 | 0 | |

Source: rsssf.com

=== Top goalscorers ===
Top League

- Oleg Blokhin (Dinamo Kiev) – 18 goals

First League

- Anatoliy Shepel (Chernomorets Odessa) – 38 goals
