= Abe van den Ban =

Dutch footballer (born 1946)

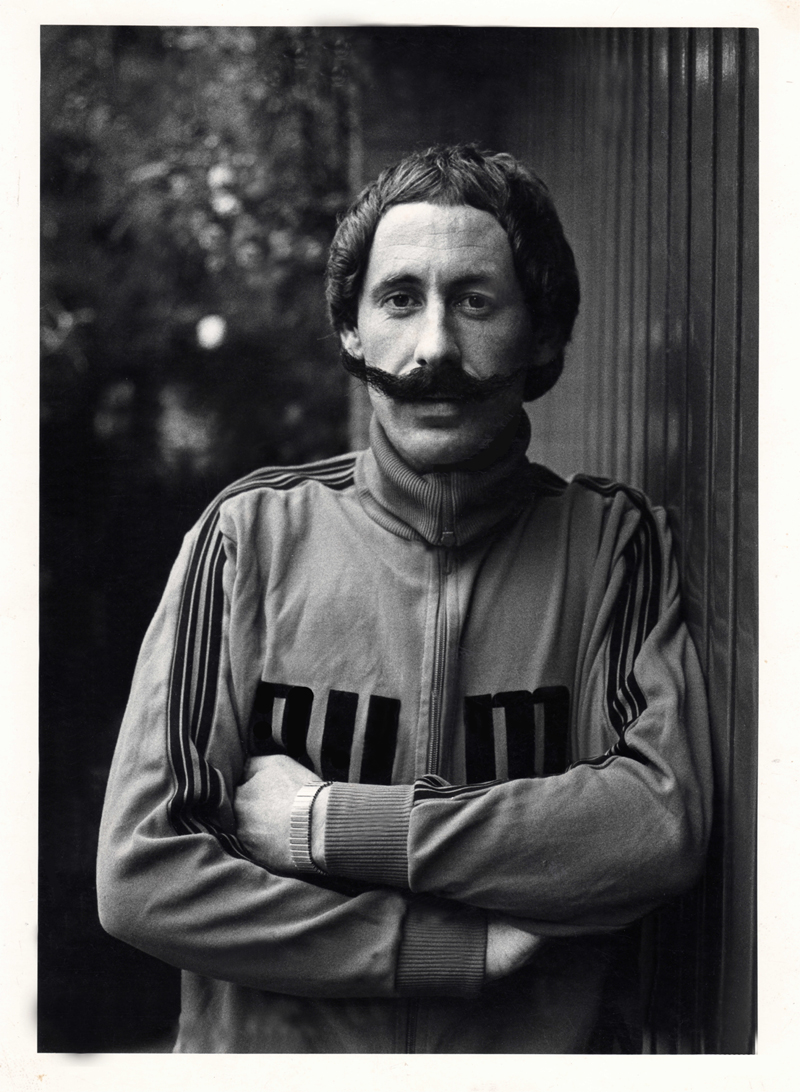
- 1977

Personal information
- Date of birth: 14 October 1946 (age 80)
- Place of birth: Zaanstad, Netherlands
- Position: Defender

Senior career*
Years	Team	Apps	(Gls)
1965–1970	ZFC		
1970–1972	AZ		
1972–1976	FC Amsterdam		
1976–1982	HFC Haarlem		
- * Club domestic league appearances and goals

Abe van den Ban (born 14 October 1946) is a Dutch former footballer who last played as a defender for HFC Haarlem.

== Career ==
He mainly operated as a defender and was described as "praised for his running ability". He started his career with Dutch side ZFC. In 1970, he signed for AZ. He made eleven league appearances and scored zero goals while playing for the club. He helped them achieve promotion. In 1972, he signed for FC Amsterdam. He made eighty-two league appearances and scored six goals while playing for the club. He helped them achieve fifth place in the league. He played in the UEFA Cup while playing for them.

In 1976, he signed for HFC Haarlem. He made 142 league appearances and scored two goals while playing for the club. He suffered relegation while playing for them. He then helped them achieve promotion. He was known for his mustache during his football career. After retiring from professional football, he worked as the owner of a hotel, cafe, restaurant, among other businesses.

== Personal life ==
Van den Ban was born on 14 October 1946 in Zaanstad, Netherlands. He was born to a mother from Breukelen, the Netherlands and a father from Wateringen, the Netherlands. He played korfball as a child. He attended Noorderschool in the Netherlands. He is a native of North Holland, Netherlands. He has been married. He is the son of a milk inspector.
