= Salaryman's Club =

Japanese anime television series

- Key visual

リーマンズクラブ (Rīmanzu Kurabu)
- Genre: Sports (Badminton)
- Created by: Team RMC
- Anime television series
- Directed by: Aimi Yamauchi
- Written by: Aimi Yamauchi; Teruko Utsumi
- Music by: Fox Capture Plan
- Studio: Liden Films
- Licensed by: Crunchyroll; SEA: Medialink
- Original network: ANN (TV Asahi), BS Asahi
- Original run: January 30, 2022 – April 17, 2022
- Episodes: 12
- Manga

Ryman's Club: BadRyman Report
- Written by: Kou Sakashita
- Published by: Bushiroad
- Magazine: Comic Bushiroad Web
- Original run: October 28, 2022 – August 25, 2023
- Volumes: 1

Salaryman's Club (also called Ryman's Club) (Japanese: リーマンズクラブ, Hepburn: Rīmanzu Kurabu) is a Japanese anime television series animated by Liden Films, directed by Aimi Yamauchi and written by Yamauchi and Teruko Utsumi. Original character designs are provided by Suzuhito Yasuda, while Majiro adapts the designs for animation. The music is composed by fox capture plan. The series aired on TV Asahi's NUMAnimation block from January 30 to April 17, 2022. (Note: The series was initially scheduled to premiere on January 23, 2022, but was moved to a week later following the delay of the final episode of the third season of World Trigger, which aired on the same time slot.) (Note: TV Asahi lists the series premiere at 25:30 on January 29, 2022, which is effectively 1:30 a.m. JST on January 30.) The opening theme song is "The Warrior" by Novelbright, while the ending theme song is "Nisen Gohyaku Man no Ichi" by Mafumafu. Crunchyroll streamed the series outside of Asia. Medialink licensed the series in Southeast Asia. A spin-off manga illustrated by Kou Sakashita was serialized on Bushiroad's Comic Bushiroad Web magazine from October 2022 to August 2023.

== Summary ==
Mikoto Shiratori, a badminton prodigy with the ability of foresight, is fired from Mitsuhoshi Banking after losing a match for their company sports badminton team and is recruited by Sunlight Beverage to play for their team. Mikoto has vowed not to play on a doubles team following an incident at his interhigh match in high school. However, his co-worker, Tatsuru Miyazumi, encourages him to be his doubles partner, and Mikoto must work through his past trauma to overcome the struggles in their teamwork.

== Characters ==
=== Sunlight Beverage ===
Mikoto Shiratori (白鳥尊, Shiratori Mikoto)
Voiced by: Junya Enoki (Japanese); Howard Wang (English)
Tatsuru Miyazumi (宮澄建, Miyazumi Tatsuru)
Voiced by: Shin-ichiro Miki
Sōta Saeki (佐伯蒼汰, Saeki Sōta)
Voiced by: Kaito Ishikawa
Tōya Saeki (佐伯橙也, Saeki Tōya)
Voiced by: Ryōta Ōsaka (Japanese); Ry McKeand (English)
Kōki Takeda (竹田浩輝, Takeda Kōki)
Voiced by: Tetsuya Kakihara
Tōru Usuyama (碓山トヲル, Usuyama Tōru)
Voiced by: Tomoaki Maeno (Japanese); Philip Annarella (English)
Yasuomi Ono (大野安臣, Ōno Yasuomi)
Voiced by: Takaya Kuroda

=== Mitsuhoshi Banking ===
Takuma Kirishima (霧島琢磨, Kirishima Takuma)
Voiced by: Yuma Uchida
Naohiro Izumo (出雲尚弘, Izumo Naohiro)
Voiced by: Makoto Furukawa
Sentaro Ibuki (伊吹泉太郎, Ibuki Sentarō)
Voiced by: Ryōtarō Okiayu
Shuhei Nakamura (仲邑周平, Nakamura Shūhei)
Voiced by: Shun Horie (Japanese); Mark Allen Jr. (English)
Chiaki Takimoto (瀧本千空, Takimoto Chiaki)
Voiced by: Yusuke Shirai
Hajime Masatoki (政時元, Masatoki Hajime)
Voiced by: Kenji Hamada

=== Unisics ===
Hayato Kirishima (霧島隼人, Kirishima Hayato)
Voiced by: Jun Fukuyama (Japanese); Jacob Browning (English)
Daiki Oginome (荻野目大樹, Oginome Daiki)
Voiced by: Yūki Ono
Ayato Misora (美空綾斗, Misora Ayato)
Voiced by: Ayumu Murase (Japanese); Lara Woodhull (English)
Jun Yagami (八神純, Yagami Jun)
Voiced by: Haruki Ishiya
Ryo Natsuki (夏木陵, Natsuki Ryō)
Voiced by: Yukihiro Nozuyama
Masahiko Utsugi (宇津木雅彦, Utsugi Masahiko)
Voiced by: Daisuke Namikawa

=== Tomari ===
Azuma Tachibana (立花梓馬, Tachibana Azuma)
Voiced by: Taku Yashiro (Japanese); John Wesley Go (English)
Shiryu Tonozaki (外崎士龍, Tonozaki Shiryū)
Voiced by: Daiki Hamano
Yuho Mashiba (間柴勇歩, Mashiba Yūho)
Voiced by: Shun'ichi Toki (Japanese); Caleb Yen (English)
Yukei Saruhashi (猿橋佑慧, Saruhashi Yūkei)
Voiced by: Nobuhiko Okamoto
Kotetsu Gokura (郷倉虎徹, Gōkura Kotetsu)
Voiced by: Tomokazu Sugita
Kohji Matsushita (松下幸治, Matsushita Kōji)
Voiced by: Atsushi Imaruoka

== Episode list ==
No.	Title	Directed by (Note: Information is taken from the ending credits of each episode.)	Written by	Storyboarded by	Original release date
1	"Assignment"; Transliteration: "Asain" (Japanese: アサイン)	Aimi Yamauchi	Teruko Utsumi	Aimi Yamauchi	January 30, 2022
2	"Synergy"; Transliteration: "Shinajī" (Japanese: シナジー)	Yasuaki Fujii	Teruko Utsumi	Yasuaki Fujii	February 6, 2022 (Note: This episode aired at 1:40 a.m. JST, 10 minutes after the original air time on TV Asahi.)
3	"Brainstorming"; Transliteration: "Buresuto" (Japanese: ブレスト)	Ryōko Nakano	Yū Satō	Ryōko Nakano	February 13, 2022
4	"Conflict"; Transliteration: "Konfurikuto" (Japanese: コンフリクト)	Yū Harima, Akira Mano	Teruko Utsumi	Masayoshi Nishida	February 20, 2022
5	"Feedback"; Transliteration: "Fīdobakku" (Japanese: フィードバック)	Yū Harima	Aimi Yamauchi	Yū Harima	February 27, 2022
6	"Presentation"; Transliteration: "Purezen" (Japanese: プレゼン)	Misato Takada	Yū Satō	Takeshi Mori	March 6, 2022 (Note: This episode aired at 2:10 a.m. JST, 40 minutes after the original air time on TV Asahi.)
7	"Alternative"; Transliteration: "Orutanatibu" (Japanese: オルタナティブ)	Isoroku Koga	Minami Nakamura	Isoroku Koga	March 13, 2022
8	"Breakthrough"; Transliteration: "Bureikusurū" (Japanese: ブレイクスルー)	Noriyuki Nomata	Teruko Utsumi	Ryūhei Aoyagi	March 20, 2022
9	"Priority"; Transliteration: "Puraioriti" (Japanese: プライオリティ)	Honami Inamura	Teruko Utsumi	Takashi Iida	March 27, 2022
10	"Tradeoff"; Transliteration: "Torēdoofu" (Japanese: トレードオフ)	Yū Harima	Yū Satō	Shingo Kaneko, Ryūhei Aoyagi, Tatsuya Shiraishi	April 3, 2022
11	"Competitor"; Transliteration: "Konpetitā" (Japanese: コンペティター)	Yasumasa Fujii	Minami Nakamura	Ryōko Nakano, Tatsuya Shiraishi	April 10, 2022
12	"Skyrocket"; Transliteration: "Aotenjō" (Japanese: 青天井)	Yū Harima	Minami Nakamura	Rei Nakahara	April 17, 2022
