= 1972 Division 2 (Swedish football) =

Swedish League Division 2
- Season: 1972
- Champions: IK Sirius; IF Saab; IF Elfsborg
- Promoted: IK Sirius; IF Saab; IF Elfsborg
- Relegated: Domsjö IF; Gefle IF; Kubikenborgs IF; Skellefteå AIK; IFK Arvika; BK Derby; Spånga IS; Tidaholms GIF; IFK Ystad; Skogens IF; Kungshamns IF; Perstorps SK

Statistics of Swedish football Division 2 for the 1972 season.

== League standings ==
=== Norra ===
Pos	Team	Pld	W	D	L	GF	GA	GD	Pts	Promotion or relegation
1	IK Sirius	22	13	7	2	43	16	+27	33	Promotion to Allsvenskan
2	IFK Holmsund	22	13	3	6	41	22	+19	29	
3	GIF Sundsvall	22	11	6	5	42	23	+19	28	
4	Sandvikens IF	22	10	6	6	36	23	+13	26	
5	Brynäs IF	22	11	3	8	28	25	+3	25	
6	Älvsjö AIK	22	10	4	8	38	25	+13	24	
7	IFK Sundsvall	22	9	5	8	23	25	−2	23	
8	IFK Luleå	22	7	8	7	28	26	+2	22	
9	Domsjö IF	22	8	5	9	25	31	−6	21	Relegation to Division 3
10	Gefle IF	22	8	1	13	36	50	−14	17	Relegation to Division 3
11	Kubikenborgs IF	22	3	3	16	22	59	−37	9	Relegation to Division 3
12	Skellefteå AIK	22	2	3	17	14	51	−37	7	Relegation to Division 3

=== Mellersta ===
Pos	Team	Pld	W	D	L	GF	GA	GD	Pts	Promotion or relegation
1	IF Saab	22	14	5	3	52	22	+30	33	Promotion to Allsvenskan
2	Skövde AIK	22	13	4	5	39	27	+12	30	
3	IFK Eskilstuna	22	9	7	6	43	33	+10	25	
4	Jönköpings Södra IF	22	9	6	7	46	40	+6	24	
5	IF Brommapojkarna	22	8	6	8	36	37	−1	22	
6	Nyköpings BIS	22	8	6	8	40	42	−2	22	
7	IK Sleipner	22	7	7	8	38	28	+10	21	
8	KB Karlskoga	22	6	9	7	33	28	+5	21	
9	IFK Arvika	22	7	7	8	32	32	0	21	Relegation to Division 3
10	BK Derby	22	7	5	10	27	38	−11	19	Relegation to Division 3
11	Spånga IS	22	6	4	12	21	44	−23	16	Relegation to Division 3
12	Tidaholms GIF	22	3	4	15	19	55	−36	10	Relegation to Division 3

=== Södra ===
Pos	Team	Pld	W	D	L	GF	GA	GD	Pts	Promotion or relegation
1	IF Elfsborg	22	18	2	2	53	14	+39	38	Promotion to Allsvenskan
2	IFK Göteborg	22	14	4	4	41	22	+19	32	
3	IFK Trelleborg	22	11	5	6	36	23	+13	27	
4	Kalmar FF	22	10	4	8	37	31	+6	24	
5	IS Halmia	22	8	7	7	30	29	+1	23	
6	Hässleholms IF	22	9	4	9	28	27	+1	22	
7	IFK Malmö	22	9	3	10	33	32	+1	21	
8	Blomstermåla IK	22	9	2	11	34	42	−8	20	
9	IFK Ystad	22	8	3	11	31	36	−5	19	Relegation to Division 3
10	Skogens IF	22	5	3	14	28	44	−16	13	Relegation to Division 3
11	Kungshamns IF	22	3	7	12	24	42	−18	13	Relegation to Division 3
12	Perstorps SK	22	4	4	14	19	52	−33	12	Relegation to Division 3
