= Geert Meijer =

Dutch footballer and manager

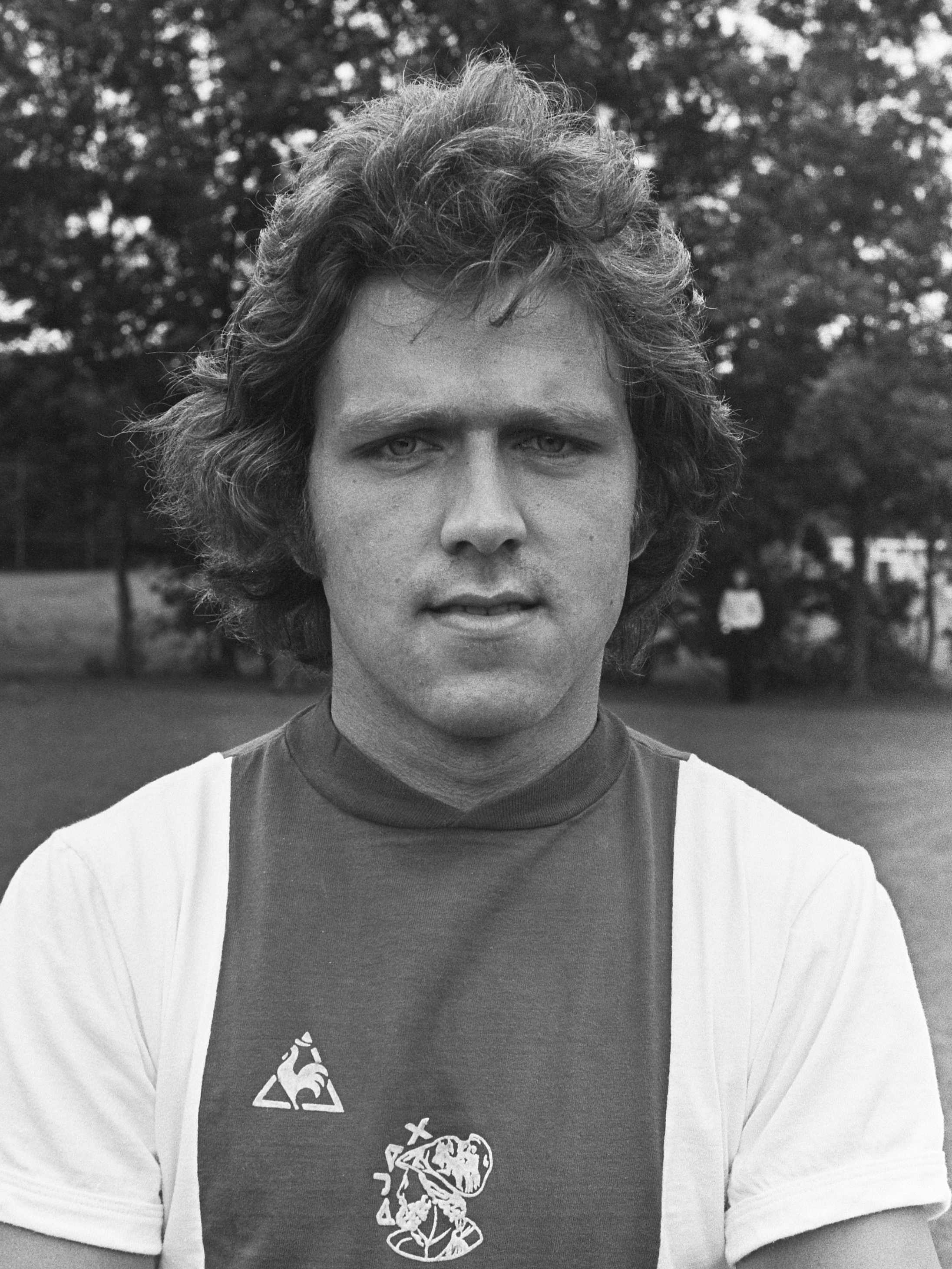
- Meijer playing for Ajax in 1975

Personal information
- Date of birth: 15 March 1951 (age 75)
- Place of birth: Sellingen, Netherlands
- Position: Left winger

Senior career*
| Years | Team | Apps | (Gls) |
| 1972–1975 | FC Amsterdam | 41 | (7) |
| 1975–1979 | Ajax | 77 | (18) |
| 1976–1977 | → FC Amsterdam (loan) | 18 | (5) |
| 1979–1980 | Bristol City | 15 | (2) |
| 1980–1983 | Sparta Rotterdam | 110 | (12) |
| 1983 | DS '79 | 13 | (0) |
| 1983–1986 | NAC Breda | 50 | (5) |
| Total | | 322 | (49) |

Managerial career
- 1983–1990: VV Strijen
- 1987–1988: DCV
- 1988–1989: Hermes DVS
- 1989–1990: DCV
- 1995: Feyenoord (caretaker)
- 1997: Feyenoord (caretaker)
- 2005: FC Hämeenlinna
- 2006–2013: VV Strijen
- 2013–2015: SV Bolnes
- 2015–2022: VV Strijen
- * Club domestic league appearances and goals

Geert Meijer (born 15 March 1951) is a Dutch football manager and former professional player.

== Playing career ==
Born in Sellingen, Meijer played as a left winger, and began his professional career in 1972 with FC Amsterdam. After moving to city rivals Ajax three years later, where he spent four seasons, Meijer spent a year in England with Bristol City, making 15 appearances in the First Division. Upon his return to the Netherlands, Meijer played for Sparta Rotterdam, DS'79 and NAC Breda, before retiring in 1986.

== Coaching career ==
While still a professional player, Meijer began his coaching career. He managed the amateur teams VV Strijen, DCV and Hermes DVS. After 3 consecutive league titles with VV Strijen, he became assistant coach at Feyenoord. Between 1990 and 1999 Meijer was the assistant of 7 different Feyenoord managers: Gunder Bengtsson, Pim Verbeek, Hans Dorjee, Wim Jansen, Willem van Hanegem, Arie Haan and Leo Beenhakker.

When Willem van Hanegem was sacked in 1995, Meijer was caretaker manager. In 1997, after Arie Haan was sacked, Meijer was also caretaker manager (together with John Metgod).

Meijer would then work as a youth coach, for 4 years at Feyenoord and for 2 years in Abu Dhabi. In 2005 he became Head Coach at FC Hämeenlinna, which played in the Ykkönen, the second level in Finland. As the Finnish football season takes place between April and October, the team avoided relegation in autumn and in December Meijer became assistant of Henk Wisman in Armenia, at both the National Team and FC Pyunik.

In 2007, Sparta Rotterdam's manager Gert Aandewie was sacked. Sparta's under−23 coach Adri van Tiggelen became caretaker manager in November and December 2007, while Meijer assisted him. This meant that Meijer took over Sparta's under−23 team from van Tiggelen for the next three and a half years.

Meijer would stay a few more years at Sparta as a scout, and as assistant of Jos van Eck when he was Sparta's caretaker manager in the 2nd division. This was from February 2011 until the end of the season. Meijer always combined his work at Sparta with coaching amateur teams SV Bolnes and VV Strijen.).

Meijer's last season at VV Strijen was 2021–22, when he finalised his third spell (each spell lasting seven years) years as head coach at VV Strijen.
