= Martin Wiggemansen =

Dutch footballer (1957–2021)

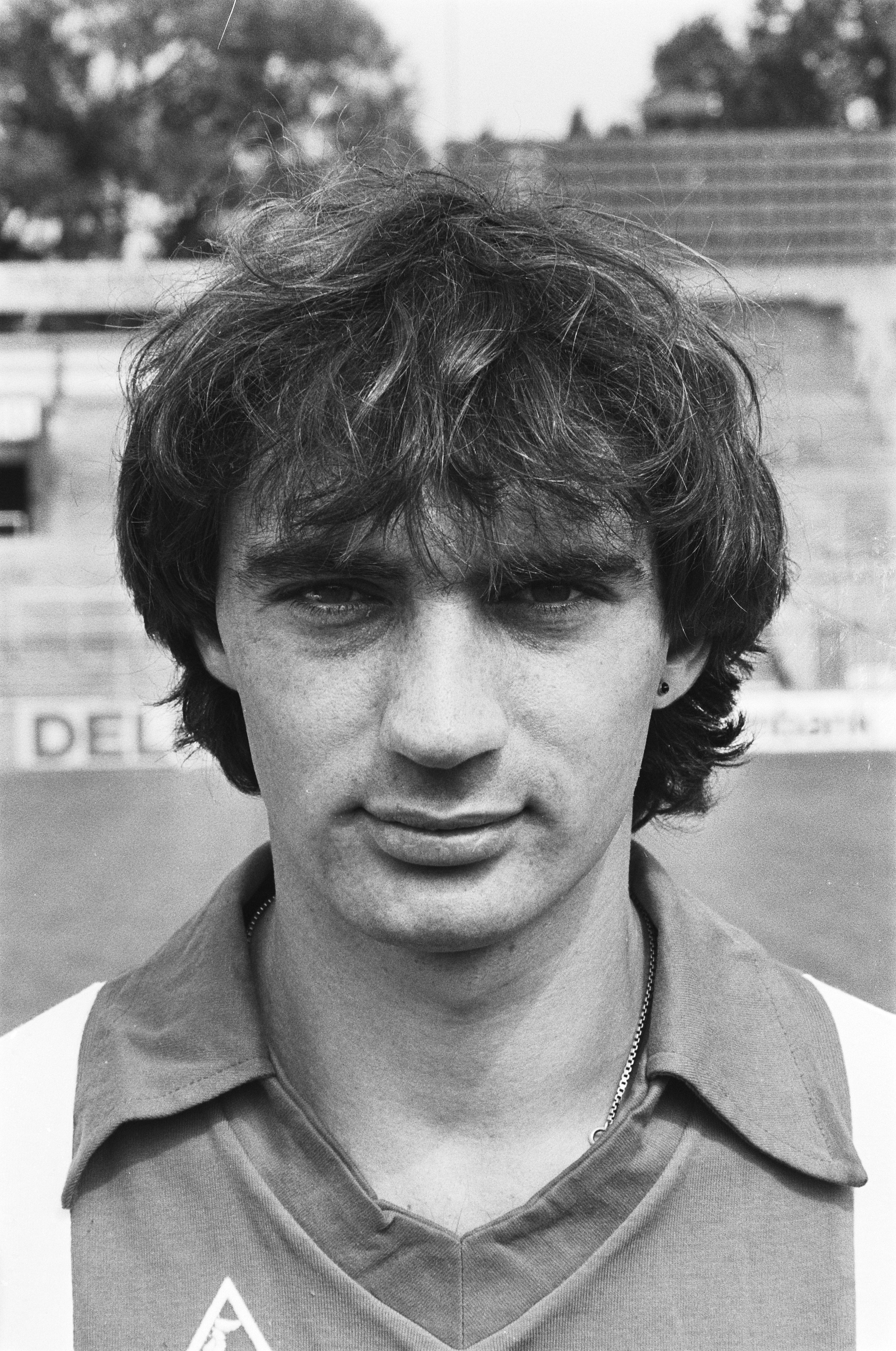
- Wiggemansen in 1981

Personal information
- Date of birth: 7 June 1957
- Place of birth: Amsterdam, Netherlands
- Date of death: 19 August 2021 (aged 64)
- Position: Left winger

Youth career
- Zeeburgia

Senior career*
Years	Team	Apps	(Gls)
1976–1980	FC Amsterdam	81	(25)
1980–1982	Ajax	20	(2)
1982–1984	Lugano	59	(32)
1984–1986	PEC Zwolle	26	(6)

International career
1978	Netherlands U21	1	(1)
- * Club domestic league appearances and goals

Martin Wiggemansen (7 June 1957 – 19 August 2021) was a Dutch professional footballer who played as a left winger.

== Club career ==
Born in Amsterdam, Wiggemansen played for FC Amsterdam, Ajax, Lugano and PEC Zwolle.

He joined Ajax in 1980 from FC Amsterdam and played 24 games for the senior side, scoring on his Eredivisie debut against Roda JC. Lured to Ajax by the club's directors, he was not wanted by Ajax manager Leo Beenhakker and Wiggemansen left the club after losing his place to Danish talent Jesper Olsen.

He scored a table-topping 19 goals for FC Lugano in the Swiss second tier-Nationalliga B in the 1983/84 season, after scoring 13 in his first season with the club.

== International career ==
He also played for the Netherlands at under-21 youth level in a game against Hungary in May 1978.

== Post-playing career ==
After retiring as a player, he worked for Ajax as a youth coach. He also worked as a consultant for an insurance company.

== Personal life ==
=== Death ===
Wiggemansen died of cancer in 2021. He was survived by his wife Ellie and their two children.
