= Heini Otto =

Dutch footballer (born 1954)

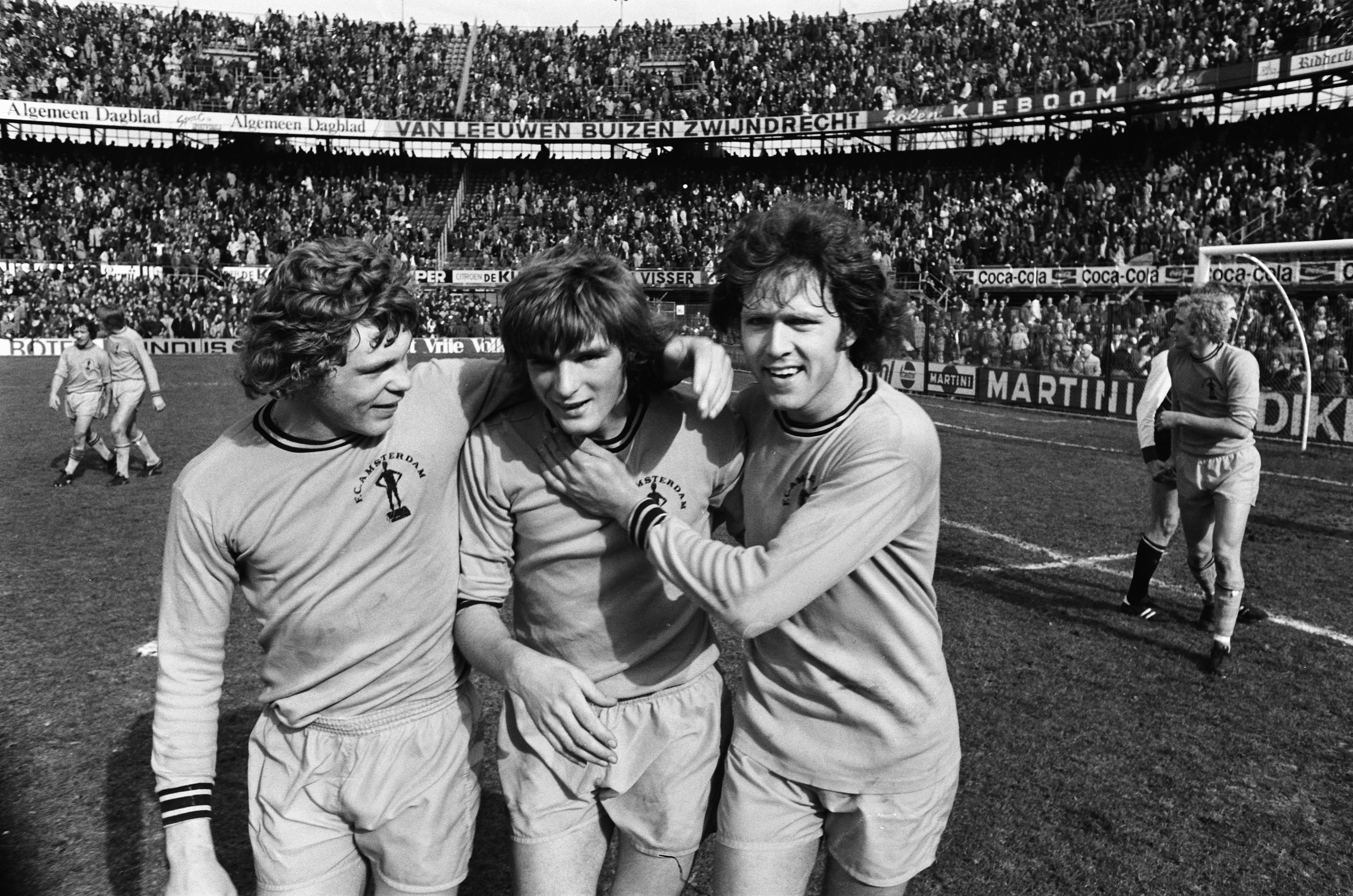
- Otto (middle) with Jansen and Meijer in 1975

Personal information
- Date of birth: 24 August 1954 (age 72)
- Place of birth: Amsterdam, Netherlands
- Height: 6 ft 0 in (1.83 m)
- Position: Attacking midfielder

Senior career*
Years	Team	Apps	(Gls)
1974–1977	FC Amsterdam	124	(18)
1977–1981	FC Twente	90	(13)
1981–1985	Middlesbrough	166	(24)
1985–1992	ADO Den Haag	241	(49)

International career
	Netherlands U23	7	(3)
1975	Netherlands	1	(0)

Managerial career
- 1997–2000: AFC Ajax (assistant manager)
- 2000–2002: HFC Haarlem
- * Club domestic league appearances and goals

Heini Otto (born 24 August 1954) is a Dutch former professional footballer who played as an attacking midfielder. He is currently working as a technical coach at Ajax.

== Club career ==
=== FC Amsterdam ===
Born and raised in Jordaan, in Amsterdam, he eventually began his career playing for FC Amsterdam in 1974 following a period at ASC SDW. He made his debut in professional football on September 15, 1974, when he came on for Gerard van der Lem in a match against HFC Haarlem. He played in the UEFA Cup in his debut season. After victories against Inter Milan and Fortuna Düsseldorf, his side were eliminated by 1. FC Köln in the quarter-finals.

He finished three seasons with the club 9th, 16th and 15th in the Eredivisie.

=== FC Twente ===
He completed a move to FC Twente, replacing Arnold Mühren who had recently departed to Ipswich Town.

In the 1978-79 season he played in the sides first leg draw against Manchester City in the UEFA Cup. In the same season his side were runners up in the KNVB Cup to Ajax.

=== Middlesbrough ===
In the summer of 1981, Otto played three friendly games for English side Middlesbrough, with a view to a permanent transfer. He impressed manager Bobby Murdoch, joining the club for €261,000 on a two-year contract. He made a scoring debut in the First Division against Tottenham Hotspur at Ayresome Park as his side lost 3–1. That season Otto was joint top scorer with five goals as the club finished 22nd.

Otto spent the rest of his time with Middlesbrough in the Second Division being ever-present in the side between 1982 and 1985. He made 155 consecutive appearances, the fourth longest period in the club's history.

=== ADO Den Haag ===
In May 1985 he rejected a contract extension with Middlesbrough and returned to the Netherlands to play for Den Haag. Otto went on to spend seven seasons at Den Haag.

In the season he joined, Den Haag won the Eerste Divisie. He spent the following two seasons in the Eredivisie, when Den Haag would again be relegated. Following relegation, Den Haag would finish second in the 1988–89 Eerste Divisie season, as Heini finished as the clubs top scorer with 17 goals. He went on to spend the three following seasons in the Eredivisie with the club before retiring July 1992, aged 37, following a match with Go Ahead Eagles. In his final season, the 1991–92 season, he became the only player to ever score two own goals in one Eredivisie game, in a match against Feyenoord.

== International career ==
His solitary cap for the Netherlands came in a very unusual way. He gave his teammate Jan Jongbloed a ride to Amsterdam Schiphol Airport and whilst dropping him at the airport, manager George Knobel noticed that Willem van Hanegem had not showed up. He asked Otto to go home as fast as he could to get his football boots and return to the airport. On the 30 May 1975, Otto replaced Peter Arntz in the 71st minute in the match against Yugoslavia as his side lost 3-0.

Five years later he was included in the national squad for the 1980 European Championship in Italy. He did not feature in a match as the squad finished third in the group stages.

== Coaching career ==
For the first two years of his coaching career, Otto was a coach and executive at Den Haag.

He would then move to Ajax where he would coach for the next three years before becoming assistant manager for a further three, alongside Morten Olsen and Jan Wouters, as his side won the Eredivisie and the KNVB Cup twice.

On 1 November 2000 Otto was appointed manager of HFC Haarlem, remaining in the job until 5 December 2002 when he stood down as a result of a heart condition which required a nine-hour open-heart operation two days later. He later returned to Ajax as a youth coach.

== Personal life ==
Otto worked for his father in the gold business, and then in a whisky distillery before becoming a professional footballer.

== Honours ==
ADO Den Haag

- Eerste Divisie: 1985–86
