= 1973 Soviet Second League =

Second League
- Season: 1973

1973 Soviet Second League was a Soviet competition in the Soviet Second League.

== Qualifying groups ==
=== Group I [Ukraine] ===
Pos	Team	Pld	W	PKW	PKL	L	GF	GA	GD	Pts	Qualification or relegation
1	Tavriya Simferopol (C, P)	44	26	6	4	8	75	36	+39	58	Promoted
2	Avtomobilist Zhytomyr	44	25	3	2	14	62	36	+26	53	
3	Sudnobudivnyk Mykolaiv	44	23	6	7	8	69	35	+34	52	
4	Hoverla Uzhhorod	44	24	3	5	12	65	52	+13	51	
5	Lokomotyv Vinnytsia	44	18	11	5	10	64	33	+31	47	
6	Shakhtar Horlivka	44	18	9	3	14	58	47	+11	45	Withdrew
7	Avanhard Sevastopol	44	16	13	3	12	44	40	+4	45	
8	Kryvbas Kryvyi Rih	44	18	6	10	10	53	45	+8	42	
9	Dynamo Khmelnytskyi	44	18	5	10	11	57	45	+12	41	
10	Lokomotyv Kherson	44	17	5	10	12	49	33	+16	39	
11	SC Chernihiv	44	18	2	6	18	63	56	+7	38	
12	Zirka Kirovohrad	44	16	4	6	18	63	57	+6	36	
13	Shakhtar Makiivka	44	15	5	9	15	50	48	+2	35	Withdrew
14	Bukovyna Chernivtsi	44	14	7	5	18	44	52	−8	35	
15	Khimik Severodonetsk	44	12	9	5	18	51	64	−13	33	Withdrew
16	Frunzenets Sumy	44	14	4	7	19	49	47	+2	32	
17	Shakhtar Kadiivka	44	15	2	3	24	42	70	−28	32	Withdrew
18	Kolos Poltava	44	12	7	1	24	44	68	−24	31	
19	SC Lutsk	44	11	8	3	22	25	50	−25	30	
20	Budivelnyk Ternopil	44	13	3	13	15	45	55	−10	29	
21	Avanhard Rovno	44	11	5	7	21	34	57	−23	27	
22	Lokomotyv Donetsk	44	9	6	5	24	35	72	−37	24	Withdrew
23	Metalurh Zhdanov	44	10	4	4	26	41	84	−43	24	Withdrew

Rules for classification: Penalty shoot-out was introduced this season. The shoot-out would take place in case when the regular game time ended in draw. Depending on outcome, its winner was awarded a point (same as for a draw) and the loser received no points.
(C) Champion; (P) Promoted

=== Group II [Soviet Northwest] ===
Pos	Rep	Team	Pld	W	PKW	PKL	L	GF	GA	GD	Pts
1	RUS	Iskra Smolensk	32	25	1	4	2	53	14	+39	51
2	LVA	Daugava Riga	32	23	3	1	5	64	20	+44	49
3	LTU	Žalgiris Vilnius	32	18	5	2	7	48	23	+25	41
4	LTU	Atlantas Klaipeda	32	15	7	2	8	46	29	+17	37
5	RUS	Volga Kalinin	32	15	2	5	10	44	28	+16	32
6	RUS	Dinamo Leningrad	32	13	5	2	12	43	32	+11	31
7	RUS	Mashinostroitel Pskov	32	12	3	5	12	31	34	−3	27
8	RUS	Baltika Kaliningrad	32	11	3	4	14	41	48	−7	25
9	RUS	Mashinostroitel Podolsk	32	11	2	8	11	31	34	−3	24
10	LVA	Zvejnieks Liepaja	32	10	4	6	12	29	35	−6	24
11	BLR	Bug Brest (Note: Spartak Brest changed name to Bug.)	32	10	3	6	13	35	46	−11	23
12	BLR	GomSelMash Gomel	32	7	5	4	16	32	49	−17	19
13	BLR	Dvina Vitebsk	32	4	11	5	12	38	36	+2	19
14	BLR	Khimik Grodno (Note: Neman Grodno changed name to Khimik.)	32	6	7	4	15	24	42	−18	19
15	RUS	Electron Novgorod	32	7	5	2	18	22	45	−23	19
16	BLR	Dnepr Mogilyov (Note: Spartak Mogilyov changed name to Dnepr.)	32	7	3	8	14	21	38	−17	17
17	RUS	Sever Murmansk	32	8	1	2	21	21	50	−29	17

=== Group III [Russian South and Caucasus] ===
Pos	Rep	Team	Pld	W	PKW	PKL	L	GF	GA	GD	Pts
1	RUS	Kuban Krasnodar	34	23	3	1	7	61	26	+35	49
2	RUS	Terek Grozny	34	19	3	3	9	73	37	+36	41
3	RUS	Druzhba Maykop	34	18	3	3	10	39	25	+14	39
4	RUS	Dinamo Stavropol	34	17	4	5	8	52	31	+21	38
5	AZE	Dinamo Kirovabad	34	17	2	4	11	40	30	+10	36
6	RUS	Uralan Elista	34	16	4	2	12	43	35	+8	36
7	RUS	Mashuk Pyatigorsk	34	16	2	4	12	45	41	+4	34
8	RUS	Stal Oryol (Note: Spartak Oryol changed name to Stal.)	34	12	8	4	10	44	36	+8	32
9	RUS	Dinamo Makhachkala	34	15	2	3	14	49	44	+5	32
10	RUS	Salyut Belgorod	34	14	3	3	14	35	36	−1	31
11	ARM	Shirak Leninakan	34	11	5	4	14	33	36	−3	27
12	RUS	Kalitva Belaya Kalitva	34	13	1	2	18	40	51	−11	27
13	RUS	Avangard Kursk (Note: Trudoviye Rezervy Kursk changed name to Avangard.)	34	11	4	7	12	39	49	−10	26
14	RUS	Khimik Novomoskovsk	34	11	2	3	18	32	50	−18	24
15	ARM	Lori Kirovakan	34	9	5	5	15	28	44	−16	23
16	RUS	Metallurg Tula	34	7	5	3	19	37	61	−24	19
17	RUS	Volgar Astrakhan	34	7	5	5	17	18	45	−27	19
18	AZE	Polad Sumgait	34	9	0	0	25	38	69	−31	18

=== Group IV [Russia and Georgia] ===
Pos	Rep	Team	Pld	W	PKW	PKL	L	GF	GA	GD	Pts
1	RUS	Spartak Kostroma	34	21	4	4	5	63	27	+36	46
2	RUS	Lokomotiv Kaluga	34	18	8	2	6	51	30	+21	44
3	RUS	Torpedo Vladimir (Note: Motor Vladimir changed name to Torpedo.)	34	19	3	3	9	65	32	+33	41
4	RUS	Dinamo Vologda	34	17	6	4	7	49	32	+17	40
5	MDA	Zvezda Tiraspol	34	18	2	3	11	43	32	+11	38
6	GEO	Mertskhali Makharadze	34	14	5	3	12	46	43	+3	33
7	RUS	Volga Gorkiy	34	14	4	6	10	51	35	+16	32
8	GEO	Guria Lanchkhuti	34	13	5	2	14	52	52	0	31
9	RUS	Trud Voronezh	34	15	0	3	16	43	42	+1	30
10	GEO	Kolkhida Poti	34	12	4	2	16	32	49	−17	28
11	GEO	Dinamo Batumi	34	13	1	5	15	36	39	−3	27
12	GEO	Lokomotiv Samtredia	34	12	3	4	15	39	61	−22	27
13	RUS	Spartak Ryazan	34	13	0	2	19	44	52	−8	26
14	GEO	Dila Gori	34	13	0	3	18	41	54	−13	26
15	RUS	Revtrud Tambov	34	10	2	5	17	35	61	−26	22
16	RUS	Saturn Rybinsk	34	8	5	3	18	30	47	−17	21
17	GEO	Dinamo Sukhumi	34	8	5	1	20	32	53	−21	21
18	RUS	Dinamo Bryansk	34	9	2	4	19	43	54	−11	20

=== Group V [Volga and Ural] ===
Pos	Team	Pld	W	PKW	PKL	L	GF	GA	GD	Pts
1	UralMash Sverdlovsk	32	24	2	4	2	61	15	+46	50
2	Rubin Kazan	32	21	5	0	6	58	26	+32	47
3	Kord Balakovo	32	23	0	4	5	62	25	+37	46
4	Khimik Dzerzhinsk	32	16	6	3	7	47	32	+15	38
5	Spartak Yoshkar-Ola	32	15	2	2	13	40	34	+6	32
6	Sokol Saratov	32	14	3	5	10	44	38	+6	31
7	Barrikady Volgograd	32	12	4	5	11	38	31	+7	28
8	Torpedo Togliatti	32	13	2	3	14	35	29	+6	28
9	Energiya Cheboksary	32	12	4	3	13	29	37	−8	28
10	Lokomotiv Chelyabinsk	32	10	3	2	17	33	43	−10	23
11	Metallurg Magnitogorsk	32	9	4	3	16	34	54	−20	22
12	Zenit Izhevsk	32	8	5	4	15	22	33	−11	21
13	Uralets Nizhniy Tagil	32	9	3	4	16	30	45	−15	21
14	Lokomotiv Orenburg	32	9	2	5	16	35	51	−16	20
15	Volga Ulyanovsk	32	7	5	5	15	21	41	−20	19
16	Dinamo Kirov	32	6	6	4	16	25	48	−23	18
17	Stroitel Ufa	32	6	2	2	22	27	59	−32	14

=== Group VI (Central Asia) ===
Pos	Rep	Team	Pld	W	PKW	PKL	L	GF	GA	GD	Pts
1	KAZ	Traktor Pavlodar	30	19	0	5	6	51	25	+26	38
2	KAZ	Alatau Jambul	30	18	2	5	5	43	23	+20	38
3	KAZ	Dinamo Tselinograd	30	17	1	2	10	43	25	+18	35
4	UZB	Avtomobilist Termez	30	13	4	4	9	41	26	+15	30
5	UZB	Yangiyer	30	14	2	4	10	44	30	+14	30
6	KAZ	Vostok Ust-Kamenogorsk	30	12	5	5	8	36	29	+7	29
7	KAZ	Spartak Semipalatinsk	30	12	4	0	14	32	37	−5	28
8	KAZ	Avtomobilist Kzil-Orda	30	12	4	3	11	33	41	−8	28
9	UZB	Trud Jizak	30	13	1	5	11	41	38	+3	27
10	UZB	Yangiaryk	30	10	7	3	10	30	36	−6	27
11	RUS	Neftyanik Tyumen	30	9	7	0	14	27	44	−17	25
12	KAZ	Yenbek Jezkazgan	30	10	4	2	14	23	34	−11	24
13	UZB	Andizhanets Andizhan	30	9	2	4	15	33	41	−8	20
14	RUS	Zauralets Kurgan	30	7	4	4	15	24	36	−12	18
15	UZB	Neftyanik Fergana	30	7	2	3	18	32	44	−12	16
16	TJK	Neftyanik Leninskiy District	30	7	2	2	19	25	49	−24	16

=== Group VII (Siberia and the Far East) ===
Pos	Team	Pld	W	PKW	PKL	L	GF	GA	GD	Pts
1	Sibiryak Bratsk	30	15	4	2	9	25	19	+6	34
2	Dinamo Barnaul	30	16	1	5	8	44	28	+16	33
3	Vulkan Petropavlovsk-Kamchatskiy	30	12	6	4	8	31	26	+5	33 (Note: 3 bonus points?)
4	Amur Blagoveshchensk	30	15	3	2	10	25	20	+5	33
5	Selenga Ulan-Ude	30	15	2	5	8	29	21	+8	32
6	Irtysh Omsk	30	14	2	5	9	38	26	+12	30
7	Avtomobilist Krasnoyarsk	30	13	4	3	10	39	32	+7	30
8	Luch Vladivostok	30	14	1	6	9	37	26	+11	29
9	Sakhalin Yuzhno-Sakhalinsk	30	12	5	3	10	30	21	+9	29
10	Start Angarsk	30	11	6	4	9	39	29	+10	28
11	TomLes Tomsk	30	12	1	6	11	22	23	−1	25
12	SKA Khabarovsk	30	7	9	1	13	31	36	−5	23
13	Aeroflot Irkutsk	30	9	3	3	15	26	41	−15	21
14	Chkalovets Novosibirsk	30	7	3	2	18	26	49	−23	17
15	Shakhtyor Prokopyevsk	30	4	5	7	14	18	44	−26	13
16	SKA Chita	30	2	4	7	17	17	36	−19	8

== Promotion playoffs ==
=== Final group ===
[Nov 4-20, Sochi]

Pos	Rep	Team	Pld	W	PKW	PKL	L	GF	GA	GD	Pts	Promotion
1	RUS	UralMash Sverdlovsk	6	4	1	0	1	14	7	+7	9	Promoted
2	UKR	Tavria Simferopol	6	4	0	1	1	13	5	+8	8	Promoted
3	RUS	Kuban Krasnodar	6	2	3	1	0	11	4	+7	7	Promoted
4	RUS	Iskra Smolensk	6	3	0	1	2	12	11	+1	6	
5	RUS	Spartak Kostroma	6	3	0	0	3	9	14	−5	6	
6	RUS	Sibiryak Bratsk	6	0	1	0	5	2	12	−10	1	
7	KAZ	Traktor Pavlodar	6	0	0	2	4	4	12	−8	0	

Source: rsssf.com
