= Laureano Rubial =

Spanish footballer (1947–2024)

Personal information
- Full name: Laureano Rubial Fernández
- Date of birth: 18 May 1947
- Place of birth: Luarca, Spain
- Date of death: 13 January 2024 (aged 76)
- Place of death: Zaragoza, Spain
- Height: 1.70 m (5 ft 7 in)
- Position: Right winger

Senior career*
Years	Team	Apps	(Gls)
1967–1968	Langreo	18	(2)
1969–1970	Plus Ultra		
1970–1972	Pontevedra	59	(8)
1972–1978	Real Zaragoza	145	(12)
1978–1979	Terrassa	21	(0)
1979–1981	Sabiñánigo		
Total		243+	(22+)
- * Club domestic league appearances and goals

Laureano Rubial Fernández (18 May 1947 – 13 January 2024) was a Spanish professional footballer who played as a right winger.

== Career ==
Born in Luarca, Rubial played for Langreo, Plus Ultra, Pontevedra, Real Zaragoza, Terrassa and Sabiñánigo. For Zaragoza he scored 17 goals in 180 appearances in all competitions.

Rubial died in Zaragoza on 13 January 2024, at the age of 76.
