= Company sports =

Company sports is organized sport activities within companies, occupational groups, trade unions and public agencies, with the goal to improve the working atmosphere. The form of organization is an alternative to the offerings through regular national sport federations and their special federations. Company sport members can sometimes also participate in sport events under those national federations, like for instance in some marathons, but then often in their own separate classes.

Motivations behind company sport groups includes increasing the health and well-being by maintenance of social contacts, to have fun, recover, promote activation and physical activity, to achieve good results for oneself or for the team, or to acquire a good performance. Company sports can help compensate for the physical and mental stresses in everyday working life.

== Organization ==
1. World Federation for Company Sport (WFCS) was founded 2 June 2014.
2. European Federation for Company Sport (EFCS) was founded 1962.

Company sports are organized internationally through the World Federation for Company Sport (WFCS). The WFCS was founded 2 June 2014 after a series of communications between the European Federation for Company Sport (EFCS) was founded 1962.) and company sport organisations in Asia.

== Members ==
Member organizations in the World Federation for Company Sport include:

=== World ===
26 Nations (17 Europe + 5 Asia + 3 Americas + 1 Africa) in May 2022:

1. Austria
2. Azerbaijan
3. Belgium
4. Canada
5. China
6. Denmark
7. France
8. Germany
9. Greece
10. India
11. Iran
12. Israel
13. Italy
14. Japan
15. Latvia
16. Lithuania
17. Morocco
18. Mexico
19. Mongolia
20. Slovenia
21. Spain
22. Sweden
23. Switzerland
24. Serbia
25. United States
26. Russia

Former Members:

1. Georgia
2. Japan
3. Nigeria
4. Norway
5. Pakistan
6. Slovenia
7. Turkey

=== Europe ===
34 Nations (36 Organization) in May 2022:

1. Austria
2. Azerbaijan
3. Belarus
4. Belgium (FROS - LFBSEL)
5. Bosnia and Herzegovina
6. Bulgaria
7. Croatia
8. Czech Republic
9. Denmark
10. Estonia
11. France
12. North Macedonia
13. Germany
14. Greece
15. Hungary
16. Iceland
17. Israel
18. Italy
19. Latvia
20. Lithuania
21. Malta
22. Moldova
23. Monaco
24. Montenegro
25. Netherlands
26. Norway
27. Russia
28. Serbia (Serbian Federation for Company Sport - Association Sport for All Serbia)
29. San Marino
30. Slovenia
31. Slovakia
32. Spain
33. Sweden
34. Ukraine

== Games ==
=== World Company Sport Games ===
==== Summer Games ====
worldcompanysport.org/events/

1. 2016 Spain
2. 2018 France
3. 2020 Greece (was held in 2021)
4. 2022 Mexico

Palma de Mallorca has hosted the 1st edition of the World Company Sport Games from June 1st to June 5th.

La Baule WCSG 2018 | 23 > 27 May 2018.

Athens WCSG LOGO 2021 Athens WCSG 2021 | 6 > 10 October 2021

==== Winter Games ====
No games until 2022.

=== European Company Sport Games ===
www.efcs.org/european-company-sport-games/

www.efcs.org/erasmus-projects/

==== Summer Games ====
From 800 participants in 1977 to more than 7000 in Salzburg in 2019.

www.cs-fs.cz/en/ecsg-2013/

European Company Sport Games 2013 in Prague

7416 participants it was the biggest sport even of 2013 in Prague. The participants came from 22 countries and competed in 30 sport disciplines.

European Summer Games 2021 Arnhem (European Company Sport Games 2021 postponed to 2022)

Summer Games 2019 - Salzburg, Austria, 22nd European Company Sport Games sixteen years after hosting them in 2003.

1. 1977: [[]], {{}}
2. 1979: [[]], {{}}
3. 1981: [[]], {{}}
4. 1983: [[]], {{}}
5. 1985: [[]], {{}}
6. 1987: [[]], {{}}
7. 1989: [[]], {{}}
8. 1991: [[]], {{}}
9. 1993: [[]], {{}}
10. 1995: [[]], {{}}
11. 1997: [[]], {{}}
12. 1999: [[]], {{}}
13. 2001: [[]], {{}}
14. 2003: [[]], {{}}
15. 2005: [[]], {{}}
16. 2007: [[]], {{}}
17. 2009: [[]], {{}}
18. 2011: [[]], {{}}
19. 2013: Prague, Czech Republic
20. 2015: [[]], {{}}
21. 2017: Ghent, Belgium
22. 2019: Salzburg, Austria
23. 2021: Arnhem, Netherlands
24. 2023: [[]], {{}}
25. 2025: Frederikshavn, Denmark

==== Winter Games ====
Winter Games 2020 Strbske Pleso in Slovakia

Strbske Pleso will host the 15th Winter Sport Games. It will be larger than ever before.

1. 1992: [[]], {{}}
2. 1994: [[]], {{}}
3. 1996: [[]], {{}}
4. 1998: [[]], {{}}
5. 2000: [[]], {{}}
6. 2002: [[]], {{}}
7. 2004: [[]], {{}}
8. 2006: [[]], {{}}
9. 2008: [[]], {{}}
10. 2010: [[]], {{}}
11. 2012: [[]], {{}}
12. 2014: [[]], {{}}
13. 2016: [[]], {{}}
14. 2018: [[]], {{}}
15. 2020: Strbske Pleso, Slovakia

== Insurance ==
It varies whether the company sport federations can be held liable for accidents during company sport events. Company sport federations may offer insurance to its members.

In some jurisdictions, like in Germany, injuries during company sports can be regarded as a "work accident" if certain requirements are fulfilled.

== See also ==
- Company team
- Sports marketing
