= Gerard van der Lem =

Dutch footballer and manager

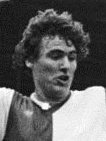
- Van der Lem in 1979

Personal information
- Full name: Pieter Gerardus van der Lem
- Date of birth: 15 November 1952 (age 74)
- Place of birth: Amsterdam, Netherlands
- Position: Striker

Youth career
- Zeeburgia
- Ajax
- FC Amsterdam

Senior career*
Years	Team	Apps	(Gls)
1973–1975	FC Amsterdam	66	(8)
1975–1977	Roda JC	66	(10)
1977–1980	Feyenoord	72	(9)
1980	Sparta Rotterdam	10	(1)
1980–1984	Utrecht	86	(17)
Total		300	(45)

International career
	Netherlands	0	(0)

Managerial career
- 1984–1985: AZ (assistant)
- 1985–1986: AZS
- 1986–1990: HFC Haarlem (assistant)
- 1990–1997: Ajax (assistant)
- 1997–1999: Barcelona (assistant)
- 1999–2001: AZ
- 2002–2003: Ajax (youth coach)
- 2003–2004: Saudi Arabia
- 2004–2006: Ajax (assistant)
- 2007: Apollon Limassol
- 2007–2008: Sharjah
- 2008–2010: Panathinaikos
- 2010–: Kayserispor (technical director)
- * Club domestic league appearances and goals

Pieter Gerardus van der Lem (born 15 November 1952) is a retired football winger from the Netherlands, who made his professional debut for FC Amsterdam on 12 August 1973 against PSV Eindhoven. He later played for Roda JC, Feyenoord, Sparta Rotterdam and Utrecht.

After his professional playing career, van der Lem started his coaching career as assistant coach to world-famous coaches like Piet de Visser, Dick Advocaat and Louis van Gaal.

In his first engagement at AZS, he was responsible coach for the amateur teams (and became Holland Champion in 1985) as well as assistant coach to Piet de Visser with the senior team. From 1986 to 1989, he was employed with Haarlem starting out as assistant coach to Advocaat, and then following him into the position of head coach during the last year.

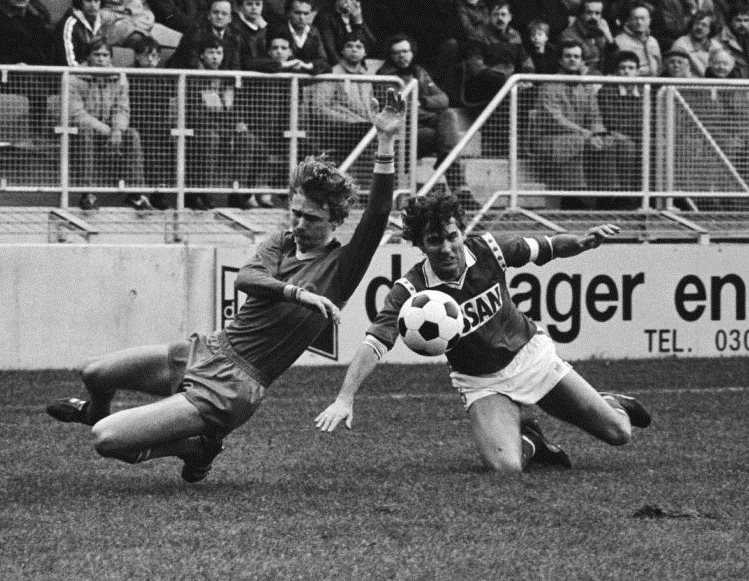
16 January 1983. Utrecht-Sparta Rotterdam 0–3. Van der Lem in a duel with van Tiggelen

Van der Lem joined Ajax in 1990 as head of the club's youth development department. In 1991, he became assistant coach to Louis van Gaal. He remained in the role until 1997, during which Ajax won several domestic and international titles, including:

3 x Dutch Champion 2 x Dutch Cup Winner 1 x Winner of the European Champions League 1 x UEFA Cup Winner 1 x Winner of the FIFA World Cup for Clubs 2 x Winner of the Dutch Super Cup

These successes did not go unseen. The next engagement of van Gaal and van der Lem followed suit at equally famous Spanish Premier League club Barcelona. In the two seasons there, van der Lem was able to achieve the following titles:

2 x Spanish Premier League Champion 1 x Spanish Cup Winner 1 x Winner of the Spanish Super Cup

After his time in Spain, van der Lem returned to his native Netherlands to become the head coach of FC Alkmaar again, followed by one season in Japan at Oita Trinita of the J-League.

Another memorable and highly successful period followed in Saudi Arabia in his first engagement as coach of the national team. He and his team won:

1 x Winner of the Gulf Cup / 1 x Winner of the Arab Cup / Qualification to the Asian Cup

Furthermore, he was awarded "Best Coach of the Middle East".

After some time back home with Ajax, where he worked in several positions (2002-2003, 2004–2006), he returned to the Middle East for an engagement with United Arab Emirates 1st League club Al Sharjah in the 2007-2008 season.

In 2008, van der Lem joined his fellow manager Henk ten Cate in an appointment at the famous Greek club Panathinaikos.

At present, van der Lem is a technical director at Kayserispor in Turkey.

== Career statistics ==
Appearances and goals by club, season and competition
Club	Season	League			KNVB Cup		Europe		Total	
Club	Season	Division	Apps	Goals	Apps	Goals	Apps	Goals	Apps	Goals
FC Amsterdam	1973–74		33	2						
FC Amsterdam	1974–75		33	6						
FC Amsterdam	Total		66	8						
Roda JC	1975–76		33	5						
Roda JC	1976–77		33	5						
Roda JC	Total		66	10						
Feyenoord	1977–78		34	6						
Feyenoord	1978–79		19	2						
Feyenoord	1979–80		19	1						
Feyenoord	Total		72	9						
Sparta Rotterdam	1979–80		10	1						
Utrecht	1980–81		23	5						
Utrecht	1981–82		31	7						
Utrecht	1982–83		17	1						
Utrecht	1983–84		15	4						
Utrecht	Total		86	17						
Career total			300	45						
