= FC Amsterdam =

- Full name: Football Club Amsterdam
- Founded: 20 June 1972
- Dissolved: 17 May 1982
- Ground: Amsterdam Olympic Stadium
- League: Eredivisie, Eerste Divisie
- 1981–82: Eerste Divisie, 13th (dissolved)
| Home colours | Away colours |

FC Amsterdam was a Dutch football club which was founded on 20 June 1972, from the merger of the Amsterdam football clubs Blauw Wit and DWS.

== History ==
The club Volewijckers joined the side for the 1973–1974 season, in which season FC Amsterdam finished as 5th of the 18 clubs in the Dutch top-league. After a successful start, in which the club made it to the quarter-finals of the 1974–75 UEFA Cup defeating Italian giants Inter Milan in the process, the club was relegated from the Eredivisie to the Eerste Divisie in the 1977–1978 season. This resulted in a massive reduction in spectator numbers for FC Amsterdam, with the club moving out of the Olympic Stadium in 1980. The side disbanded in May 1982, after the 1981–1982 season.

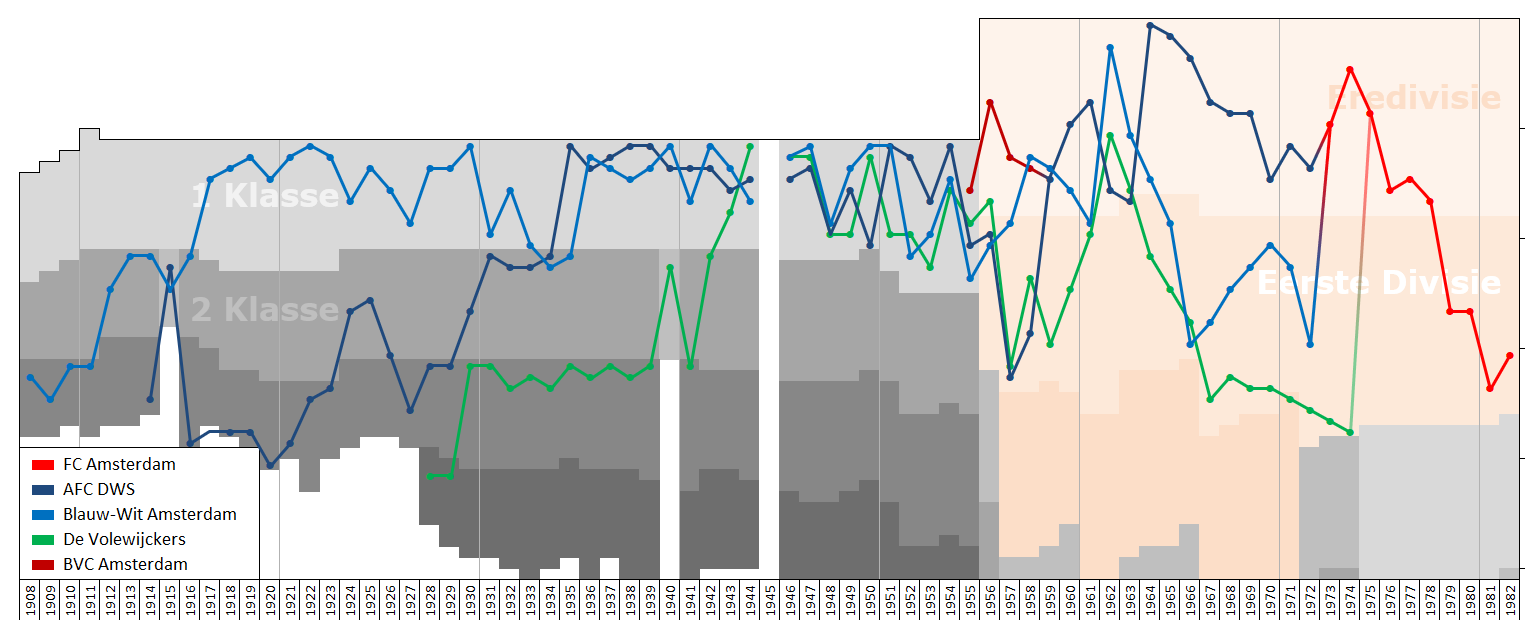
Historical chart of league performance (incl. predecessors)

Their players included Jan Jongbloed (1972–1977), the Dutch goalkeeper in the 1974 World Cup Final, and also Geert Meijer, Gerard van der Lem, Nico Jansen, Andre Wetzel, Martin Wiggemansen and Heini Otto.
