= Arne Skotte =

Swedish footballer (1950–2020)

Personal information
- Date of birth: 13 January 1950
- Date of death: 25 December 2020 (aged 70)

Senior career*
Years	Team	Apps	(Gls)
1972–1974	Djurgården		
1975–1983	Örebro		
1983	Skellefteå		
- * Club domestic league appearances and goals

Arne Skotte (13 January 1950 – 25 December 2020) was a Swedish footballer. Skotte made 69 Allsvenskan appearances for Djurgården and scored 11 goals. He scored 51 goals for Örebro. He died on 25 December 2020- from COVID-19.
