= Kjell Samuelsson (footballer) =

Swedish footballer

Personal information
- Date of birth: 22 August 1951 (age 75)

Senior career*
Years	Team	Apps	(Gls)
1972–1979	Djurgårdens IF	173	(37)
1976	San Jose Earthquakes (indoor)		
1976	San Diego Jaws	3	(0)

International career
1972–1975	Sweden U23	4	(0)
- * Club domestic league appearances and goals

Kjell Samuelsson (born 22 August 1951) is a Swedish former footballer. He made 173 Allsvenskan appearances for Djurgårdens IF and scored 37 goals. He also spent time in the North American Soccer League with the San Jose Earthquakes and the San Diego Jaws.
