= 1973 Allsvenskan =

49th season of Allsvenskan

Allsvenskan
- Season: 1973
- Champions: Åtvidabergs FF
- Relegated: Örgryte IS; IF Saab
- European Cup: Åtvidabergs FF
- UEFA Cup: Östers IF; Djurgårdens IF
- Top goalscorer: Jan Mattsson, Östers IF (20)
- Average attendance: 7,414

Statistics of Allsvenskan in season 1973.

== Overview ==
The league was contested by 14 teams, with Åtvidabergs FF winning the championship.

== League table ==
Pos	Team	Pld	W	D	L	GF	GA	GD	Pts	Qualification or relegation
1	Åtvidabergs FF (C)	26	16	5	5	53	32	+21	37	Qualification to European Cup first round
2	Östers IF	26	11	9	6	46	27	+19	31	Qualification to UEFA Cup first round
3	Djurgårdens IF	26	13	5	8	53	38	+15	31	Qualification to UEFA Cup first round
4	Malmö FF	26	12	6	8	46	32	+14	30	Qualification to Cup Winners' Cup first round (Note: Malmö FF qualified for the European Cup Winners' Cup as Svenska Cupen champions 1973–74.)
5	AIK	26	13	4	9	42	29	+13	30	
6	IFK Norrköping	26	9	11	6	48	34	+14	29	
7	Landskrona BoIS	26	11	6	9	35	34	+1	28	
8	Hammarby IF	26	9	8	9	33	37	−4	26	
9	IF Elfsborg	26	7	11	8	36	37	−1	25	
10	GAIS	26	9	7	10	33	42	−9	25	
11	Örebro SK	26	8	8	10	42	42	0	24	
12	IK Sirius	26	7	5	14	20	48	−28	19	
13	Örgryte IS (R)	26	3	9	14	31	59	−28	15	Relegation to Division 2
14	Saab (R)	26	4	6	16	26	53	−27	14	Relegation to Division 2

Rules for classification: 1) points; 2) goal difference; 3) number of goals scored.
(C) Champions; (R) Relegated

== Results ==
Home \ Away	AIK	DIF	GAIS	HIF	IFE	IFS	IFK	IKS	BOIS	MFF	ÅFF	ÖSK	ÖIS	ÖIF
AIK		0–3	2–0	2–1	2–2	4–1	1–0	0–1	1–2	3–0	1–2	1–1	4–0	1–1
Djurgårdens IF	0–4		5–2	2–2	3–0	1–0	2–2	3–1	3–1	3–1	0–3	0–0	4–2	2–1
GAIS	1–3	2–0		2–2	3–3	1–0	4–2	0–1	2–2	2–3	2–1	2–5	1–1	1–1
Hammarby IF	3–0	4–1	1–0		0–1	1–0	0–0	3–1	0–3	0–1	2–1	2–0	2–2	0–4
IF Elfsborg	1–1	1–1	0–2	1–1		1–2	5–2	1–1	0–0	2–1	1–0	3–1	3–1	2–2
IF Saab	0–2	0–6	1–0	4–2	0–0		1–2	0–1	1–1	0–1	1–3	1–3	1–1	1–1
IFK Norrköping	1–0	3–0	5–0	1–1	1–1	0–2		6–0	4–1	1–1	1–1	3–1	2–2	2–2
IK Sirius	1–2	0–5	0–0	0–0	1–1	3–2	0–2		2–3	2–1	0–2	0–0	2–0	1–0
Landskrona BoIS	0–2	2–0	0–1	1–2	1–0	4–2	1–1	2–0		0–1	1–1	1–2	1–0	0–3
Malmö FF	2–0	3–2	0–1	0–1	4–2	1–0	1–1	3–1	1–1		4–0	6–0	4–0	2–4
Åtvidabergs FF	0–3	1–1	2–0	4–1	2–1	4–1	2–1	1–0	4–0	3–2		4–3	2–2	2–2
Örebro SK	2–3	0–3	1–2	3–0	2–1	1–1	1–1	6–0	0–1	1–1	0–2		1–1	1–0
Örgryte IS	2–0	1–2	1–1	2–1	1–3	3–3	0–3	4–1	0–4	1–1	2–5	1–5		0–1
Östers IF	2–0	2–1	0–1	1–1	2–0	6–1	4–1	1–0	1–2	1–1	0–1	2–2	2–1	

Legend: Blue = home team win; Yellow = draw; Red = away team win.

== Attendances ==
#	Club	Average	Highest
1	GAIS	10,372	39,729
2	Malmö FF	9,976	23,527
3	AIK	9,522	34,584
4	IF Elfsborg	8,236	12,945
5	Djurgårdens IF	7,928	24,161
6	Hammarby IF	7,631	14,680
7	IK Sirius	7,329	11,474
8	IFK Norrköping	7,267	18,799
9	Örgryte IS	6,413	18,130
10	Landskrona BoIS	6,131	15,514
11	Östers IF	6,070	9,630
12	IF SAAB	5,870	17,944
13	Åtvidabergs FF	5,286	9,104
14	Örebro SK	5,188	10,017
