= 1949–50 Football League =

51st season of the Football League

The Football League
- Season: 1949–50
- Champions: Portsmouth

The 1949–50 season was the 51st completed season of The Football League.

== Final league tables ==
The tables below are reproduced here in the exact form that they can be found at The Rec.Sport.Soccer Statistics Foundation website and in Rothmans Book of Football League Records 1888–89 to 1978–79, with home and away statistics separated.

Beginning with the season 1894–95, clubs finishing level on points were separated according to goal average (goals scored divided by goals conceded), or more properly put, goal ratio. In case one or more teams had the same goal difference, this system favoured those teams who had scored fewer goals. The goal average system was eventually scrapped beginning with the 1976–77 season.

From the 1922–23 season, the bottom two teams of both Third Division North and Third Division South were required to apply for re-election.

== First Division ==
First Division
- Season: 1949–50
- Champions: Portsmouth; 2nd English title
- Relegated: Manchester City; Birmingham City
- Matches: 462
- Goals: 1,247 (2.7 per match)
- Top goalscorer: Dickie Davis (25 goals)

Portsmouth retained the First Division title, finishing level on points with Wolverhampton Wanderers. Sunderland finished a single point behind the leading pair, with Manchester United and Newcastle United completing the top five. Sixth placed Arsenal, the 1948 champions, finished four points off the top of the table but beat Liverpool to win their first postwar FA Cup.

Manchester City and Birmingham City went down to the Second Division.

| Pos | Team | Pld | W | D | L | GF | GA | GAv | Pts | Relegation |
|---|---|---|---|---|---|---|---|---|---|---|
| 1 | Portsmouth (C) | 42 | 22 | 9 | 11 | 74 | 38 | 1.947 | 53 | |
| 2 | Wolverhampton Wanderers | 42 | 20 | 13 | 9 | 76 | 49 | 1.551 | 53 | |
| 3 | Sunderland | 42 | 21 | 10 | 11 | 83 | 62 | 1.339 | 52 | |
| 4 | Manchester United | 42 | 18 | 14 | 10 | 69 | 44 | 1.568 | 50 | |
| 5 | Newcastle United | 42 | 19 | 12 | 11 | 77 | 55 | 1.400 | 50 | |
| 6 | Arsenal | 42 | 19 | 11 | 12 | 79 | 55 | 1.436 | 49 | |
| 7 | Blackpool | 42 | 17 | 15 | 10 | 46 | 35 | 1.314 | 49 | |
| 8 | Liverpool | 42 | 17 | 14 | 11 | 64 | 54 | 1.185 | 48 | |
| 9 | Middlesbrough | 42 | 20 | 7 | 15 | 59 | 48 | 1.229 | 47 | |
| 10 | Burnley | 42 | 16 | 13 | 13 | 40 | 40 | 1.000 | 45 | |
| 11 | Derby County | 42 | 17 | 10 | 15 | 69 | 61 | 1.131 | 44 | |
| 12 | Aston Villa | 42 | 15 | 12 | 15 | 61 | 61 | 1.000 | 42 | |
| 13 | Chelsea | 42 | 12 | 16 | 14 | 58 | 65 | 0.892 | 40 | |
| 14 | West Bromwich Albion | 42 | 14 | 12 | 16 | 47 | 53 | 0.887 | 40 | |
| 15 | Huddersfield Town | 42 | 14 | 9 | 19 | 52 | 73 | 0.712 | 37 | |
| 16 | Bolton Wanderers | 42 | 10 | 14 | 18 | 45 | 59 | 0.763 | 34 | |
| 17 | Fulham | 42 | 10 | 14 | 18 | 41 | 54 | 0.759 | 34 | |
| 18 | Everton | 42 | 10 | 14 | 18 | 42 | 66 | 0.636 | 34 | |
| 19 | Stoke City | 42 | 11 | 12 | 19 | 45 | 75 | 0.600 | 34 | |
| 20 | Charlton Athletic | 42 | 13 | 6 | 23 | 53 | 65 | 0.815 | 32 | |
| 21 | Manchester City (R) | 42 | 8 | 13 | 21 | 36 | 68 | 0.529 | 29 | Relegation to the Second Division |
| 22 | Birmingham City (R) | 42 | 7 | 14 | 21 | 31 | 67 | 0.463 | 28 | Relegation to the Second Division |

Source: World Football
Rules for classification: 1) Points; 2) Goal average; 3) Goals scored
(C) Champions; (R) Relegated

=== Results ===
| Home \ Away | ARS | AST | BIR | BLP | BOL | BUR | CHA | CHE | DER | EVE | FUL | HUD | LIV | MCI | MUN | MID | NEW | POR | STK | SUN | WBA | WOL |
|---|---|---|---|---|---|---|---|---|---|---|---|---|---|---|---|---|---|---|---|---|---|---|
| Arsenal | | 1–3 | 4–2 | 1–0 | 1–1 | 0–1 | 2–3 | 2–3 | 1–0 | 5–2 | 2–1 | 1–0 | 1–2 | 4–1 | 0–0 | 1–1 | 4–2 | 2–0 | 6–0 | 5–0 | 4–1 | 1–1 |
| Aston Villa | 1–1 | | 1–1 | 0–0 | 3–0 | 0–1 | 1–1 | 4–0 | 1–1 | 2–2 | 3–1 | 2–1 | 2–0 | 1–0 | 0–4 | 4–0 | 0–1 | 1–0 | 1–1 | 2–0 | 1–0 | 1–4 |
| Birmingham City | 2–1 | 2–2 | | 0–2 | 0–0 | 0–1 | 2–0 | 0–3 | 2–2 | 0–0 | 1–1 | 2–1 | 2–3 | 1–0 | 0–0 | 0–0 | 0–2 | 0–3 | 1–0 | 1–2 | 2–0 | 1–1 |
| Blackpool | 2–1 | 1–0 | 1–1 | | 2–0 | 2–0 | 2–0 | 0–0 | 1–0 | 0–1 | 0–0 | 4–1 | 0–0 | 0–0 | 3–3 | 1–1 | 0–0 | 2–1 | 4–2 | 0–1 | 3–0 | 1–2 |
| Bolton Wanderers | 2–2 | 1–1 | 1–0 | 0–0 | | 0–1 | 3–0 | 1–0 | 0–0 | 1–2 | 2–1 | 1–2 | 3–2 | 3–0 | 1–2 | 1–2 | 2–2 | 1–0 | 4–0 | 2–1 | 3–0 | 2–4 |
| Burnley | 0–0 | 1–0 | 1–1 | 0–0 | 2–1 | | 1–0 | 1–2 | 0–1 | 5–1 | 0–0 | 1–0 | 0–2 | 0–0 | 1–0 | 3–2 | 1–2 | 2–1 | 2–1 | 2–2 | 0–0 | 0–1 |
| Charlton Athletic | 1–1 | 1–4 | 2–0 | 1–2 | 0–0 | 1–1 | | 1–0 | 1–3 | 2–0 | 2–1 | 2–2 | 1–3 | 3–1 | 1–2 | 0–3 | 6–3 | 1–2 | 2–0 | 2–2 | 1–2 | 2–3 |
| Chelsea | 1–2 | 1–3 | 3–0 | 1–1 | 1–1 | 0–1 | 1–3 | | 1–2 | 3–2 | 0–0 | 3–1 | 1–1 | 3–0 | 1–1 | 2–1 | 1–3 | 1–4 | 2–2 | 3–1 | 2–1 | 0–0 |
| Derby County | 1–2 | 3–2 | 4–1 | 0–0 | 4–0 | 1–1 | 1–2 | 2–2 | | 2–0 | 2–1 | 4–2 | 2–2 | 7–0 | 0–1 | 1–0 | 1–1 | 2–1 | 2–3 | 3–2 | 3–1 | 1–2 |
| Everton | 0–1 | 1–1 | 0–0 | 3–0 | 0–0 | 1–1 | 0–1 | 1–1 | 1–2 | | 1–1 | 3–0 | 0–0 | 3–1 | 0–0 | 3–1 | 2–1 | 1–2 | 2–1 | 0–2 | 1–2 | 1–2 |
| Fulham | 2–2 | 3–0 | 0–0 | 1–0 | 3–0 | 1–0 | 1–2 | 1–1 | 0–0 | 0–0 | | 4–1 | 0–1 | 1–0 | 1–0 | 1–2 | 2–1 | 0–1 | 2–2 | 0–3 | 0–1 | 1–2 |
| Huddersfield Town | 2–2 | 1–0 | 1–0 | 0–1 | 2–0 | 1–2 | 2–1 | 1–2 | 2–0 | 1–2 | 2–2 | | 3–2 | 1–0 | 3–1 | 2–2 | 1–2 | 0–1 | 4–0 | 3–1 | 1–1 | 1–0 |
| Liverpool | 2–0 | 2–1 | 2–0 | 0–1 | 1–1 | 0–1 | 1–0 | 2–2 | 3–1 | 3–1 | 1–1 | 2–3 | | 4–0 | 1–1 | 2–0 | 2–2 | 2–2 | 1–1 | 4–2 | 2–1 | 0–2 |
| Manchester City | 0–2 | 3–3 | 4–0 | 0–3 | 1–1 | 1–0 | 2–0 | 1–1 | 2–2 | 0–0 | 2–0 | 1–2 | 1–2 | | 1–2 | 0–1 | 1–1 | 1–0 | 1–1 | 2–1 | 1–1 | 2–1 |
| Manchester United | 2–0 | 7–0 | 0–2 | 1–2 | 3–0 | 3–2 | 3–2 | 1–0 | 0–1 | 1–1 | 3–0 | 6–0 | 0–0 | 2–1 | | 2–0 | 1–1 | 0–2 | 2–2 | 1–3 | 1–1 | 3–0 |
| Middlesbrough | 1–1 | 0–2 | 1–0 | 2–0 | 2–0 | 4–1 | 1–0 | 2–1 | 3–1 | 0–1 | 1–2 | 3–0 | 4–1 | 0–0 | 2–3 | | 1–0 | 1–5 | 2–0 | 2–0 | 3–0 | 2–0 |
| Newcastle United | 0–3 | 3–2 | 3–1 | 3–0 | 3–1 | 0–0 | 1–0 | 2–2 | 2–1 | 4–0 | 3–1 | 0–0 | 5–1 | 4–2 | 2–1 | 0–1 | | 1–3 | 4–1 | 2–2 | 5–1 | 2–0 |
| Portsmouth | 2–1 | 5–1 | 2–0 | 2–3 | 1–1 | 2–1 | 1–0 | 4–0 | 3–1 | 7–0 | 3–0 | 4–0 | 2–1 | 1–1 | 0–0 | 1–1 | 1–0 | | 0–0 | 2–2 | 0–1 | 1–1 |
| Stoke City | 2–5 | 1–0 | 3–1 | 1–1 | 3–2 | 1–1 | 0–3 | 2–3 | 1–3 | 1–0 | 0–2 | 0–0 | 0–0 | 2–0 | 3–1 | 1–0 | 1–0 | 0–1 | | 2–1 | 1–3 | 2–1 |
| Sunderland | 4–2 | 2–1 | 1–1 | 1–1 | 2–0 | 2–1 | 2–1 | 4–1 | 6–1 | 4–2 | 2–0 | 1–1 | 3–2 | 1–2 | 2–2 | 2–0 | 2–2 | 1–1 | 3–0 | | 2–1 | 3–1 |
| West Bromwich Albion | 1–2 | 1–1 | 3–0 | 1–0 | 2–1 | 3–0 | 1–0 | 1–1 | 1–0 | 4–0 | 4–1 | 0–0 | 0–1 | 0–0 | 1–2 | 0–3 | 1–1 | 3–0 | 0–0 | 0–2 | | 1–1 |
| Wolverhampton Wanderers | 3–0 | 2–3 | 6–1 | 3–0 | 1–1 | 0–0 | 2–1 | 2–2 | 4–1 | 1–1 | 1–1 | 7–1 | 1–1 | 3–0 | 1–1 | 3–1 | 2–1 | 1–0 | 2–1 | 1–3 | 1–1 | |

Updated to match(es) played on unknown. Source: Ian Laschke: Rothmans Book of Football League Records 1888–89 to 1978–79. Macdonald and Jane’s, London & Sydney, 1980.
Legend: Blue = home team win; Yellow = draw; Red = away team win.

=== Maps ===
Locations of the Football League First Division London teams 1949–1950
Locations of the Football League First Division 1949–1950 teams

== Second Division ==
Second Division
- Season: 1949–50
- Champions: Tottenham Hotspur
- Promoted: Tottenham Hotspur; Sheffield Wednesday
- Relegated: Plymouth Argyle; Bradford Park Avenue
- Matches: 462
- Goals: 1,231 (2.66 per match)
- Top goalscorer: Tommy Briggs (35 goals)

| Pos | Team | Pld | W | D | L | GF | GA | GAv | Pts | Qualification or relegation |
|---|---|---|---|---|---|---|---|---|---|---|
| 1 | Tottenham Hotspur (C, P) | 42 | 27 | 7 | 8 | 81 | 35 | 2.314 | 61 | Promotion to the First Division |
| 2 | Sheffield Wednesday (P) | 42 | 18 | 16 | 8 | 67 | 48 | 1.396 | 52 | Promotion to the First Division |
| 3 | Sheffield United | 42 | 19 | 14 | 9 | 68 | 49 | 1.388 | 52 | |
| 4 | Southampton | 42 | 19 | 14 | 9 | 64 | 48 | 1.333 | 52 | |
| 5 | Leeds United | 42 | 17 | 13 | 12 | 54 | 45 | 1.200 | 47 | |
| 6 | Preston North End | 42 | 18 | 9 | 15 | 60 | 49 | 1.224 | 45 | |
| 7 | Hull City | 42 | 17 | 11 | 14 | 64 | 72 | 0.889 | 45 | |
| 8 | Swansea Town | 42 | 17 | 9 | 16 | 53 | 49 | 1.082 | 43 | |
| 9 | Brentford | 42 | 15 | 13 | 14 | 44 | 49 | 0.898 | 43 | |
| 10 | Cardiff City | 42 | 16 | 10 | 16 | 41 | 44 | 0.932 | 42 | |
| 11 | Grimsby Town | 42 | 16 | 8 | 18 | 74 | 73 | 1.014 | 40 | |
| 12 | Coventry City | 42 | 13 | 13 | 16 | 55 | 55 | 1.000 | 39 | |
| 13 | Barnsley | 42 | 13 | 13 | 16 | 64 | 67 | 0.955 | 39 | |
| 14 | Chesterfield | 42 | 15 | 9 | 18 | 43 | 47 | 0.915 | 39 | |
| 15 | Leicester City | 42 | 12 | 15 | 15 | 55 | 65 | 0.846 | 39 | |
| 16 | Blackburn Rovers | 42 | 14 | 10 | 18 | 55 | 60 | 0.917 | 38 | |
| 17 | Luton Town | 42 | 10 | 18 | 14 | 41 | 51 | 0.804 | 38 | |
| 18 | Bury | 42 | 14 | 9 | 19 | 60 | 65 | 0.923 | 37 | |
| 19 | West Ham United | 42 | 12 | 12 | 18 | 53 | 61 | 0.869 | 36 | |
| 20 | Queens Park Rangers | 42 | 11 | 12 | 19 | 40 | 57 | 0.702 | 34 | |
| 21 | Plymouth Argyle (R) | 42 | 8 | 16 | 18 | 44 | 65 | 0.677 | 32 | Relegation to the Third Division South |
| 22 | Bradford (Park Avenue) (R) | 42 | 10 | 11 | 21 | 51 | 77 | 0.662 | 31 | Relegation to the Third Division North |

Rules for classification: 1) Points; 2) Goal average; 3) Goals scored
(C) Champions; (P) Promoted; (R) Relegated

=== Results ===
| Home \ Away | BAR | BLB | BPA | BRE | BRY | CAR | CHF | COV | GRI | HUL | LEE | LEI | LUT | PLY | PNE | QPR | SHU | SHW | SOU | SWA | TOT | WHU |
|---|---|---|---|---|---|---|---|---|---|---|---|---|---|---|---|---|---|---|---|---|---|---|
| Barnsley | | 1–1 | 3–2 | 0–1 | 1–0 | 1–0 | 1–2 | 4–3 | 7–2 | 1–1 | 1–1 | 2–2 | 1–0 | 4–1 | 0–1 | 3–1 | 2–2 | 3–4 | 2–1 | 5–2 | 2–0 | 1–1 |
| Blackburn Rovers | 4–0 | | 0–1 | 4–1 | 2–1 | 1–0 | 1–1 | 0–1 | 3–0 | 4–2 | 0–1 | 3–0 | 0–0 | 1–0 | 2–3 | 0–0 | 0–2 | 0–0 | 0–0 | 2–0 | 1–2 | 2–0 |
| Bradford Park Avenue | 1–3 | 2–2 | | 0–2 | 1–2 | 3–3 | 2–0 | 2–2 | 4–1 | 5–1 | 1–2 | 2–2 | 1–0 | 3–2 | 1–2 | 1–0 | 1–1 | 1–3 | 0–0 | 0–2 | 1–3 | 2–1 |
| Brentford | 3–0 | 2–0 | 2–0 | | 2–0 | 1–0 | 0–0 | 2–0 | 1–0 | 3–1 | 0–0 | 0–1 | 1–0 | 0–0 | 1–0 | 0–2 | 1–0 | 1–1 | 0–1 | 0–0 | 1–4 | 0–2 |
| Bury | 2–0 | 3–0 | 1–0 | 1–2 | | 2–2 | 2–0 | 0–0 | 3–1 | 0–0 | 2–0 | 3–0 | 5–2 | 5–1 | 1–1 | 0–0 | 1–5 | 0–0 | 1–1 | 1–1 | 1–2 | 3–1 |
| Cardiff City | 3–0 | 2–1 | 1–2 | 0–0 | 1–0 | | 2–0 | 1–0 | 1–0 | 2–0 | 1–0 | 2–4 | 0–0 | 1–0 | 3–2 | 4–0 | 1–2 | 1–0 | 1–1 | 1–0 | 0–1 | 0–1 |
| Chesterfield | 1–0 | 2–1 | 1–1 | 3–1 | 2–1 | 0–1 | | 0–1 | 2–1 | 0–1 | 3–1 | 1–0 | 0–1 | 2–0 | 2–0 | 2–1 | 0–1 | 1–2 | 0–0 | 4–1 | 1–1 | 1–0 |
| Coventry City | 1–1 | 1–1 | 3–1 | 1–1 | 1–2 | 2–1 | 3–0 | | 1–1 | 2–0 | 0–4 | 1–2 | 1–0 | 3–0 | 0–0 | 0–0 | 2–4 | 3–0 | 1–2 | 1–2 | 0–1 | 5–1 |
| Grimsby Town | 2–2 | 1–2 | 4–0 | 4–1 | 4–2 | 0–0 | 5–2 | 3–2 | | 1–0 | 2–0 | 2–1 | 6–1 | 2–2 | 1–3 | 1–1 | 4–0 | 4–1 | 1–1 | 2–1 | 2–3 | 2–0 |
| Hull City | 2–0 | 3–1 | 3–3 | 2–0 | 3–2 | 1–1 | 1–0 | 2–1 | 2–2 | | 1–0 | 4–0 | 1–1 | 4–2 | 4–2 | 1–1 | 0–4 | 1–1 | 1–2 | 0–0 | 1–0 | 2–2 |
| Leeds United | 1–0 | 2–1 | 0–0 | 1–0 | 4–1 | 2–0 | 0–0 | 3–3 | 1–0 | 3–0 | | 1–1 | 2–1 | 1–1 | 3–1 | 1–1 | 0–1 | 1–1 | 1–0 | 1–2 | 3–0 | 2–2 |
| Leicester City | 2–2 | 3–3 | 4–1 | 1–1 | 0–2 | 1–0 | 0–1 | 1–0 | 1–0 | 1–2 | 1–1 | | 3–2 | 0–0 | 1–0 | 3–2 | 1–1 | 2–2 | 2–2 | 0–0 | 1–2 | 2–1 |
| Luton Town | 3–1 | 5–2 | 3–1 | 1–0 | 2–1 | 0–0 | 1–1 | 2–0 | 0–0 | 0–3 | 1–0 | 1–0 | | 1–1 | 1–1 | 1–2 | 1–3 | 0–0 | 1–1 | 1–2 | 1–1 | 2–2 |
| Plymouth Argyle | 2–2 | 0–0 | 1–1 | 2–0 | 2–0 | 0–0 | 2–1 | 1–2 | 4–2 | 1–3 | 1–2 | 2–1 | 0–0 | | 1–0 | 0–2 | 0–1 | 0–1 | 0–0 | 0–1 | 0–2 | 0–3 |
| Preston North End | 1–1 | 3–1 | 3–0 | 2–0 | 3–1 | 3–0 | 0–0 | 1–1 | 2–0 | 4–2 | 1–1 | 2–1 | 0–1 | 0–0 | | 3–2 | 4–1 | 0–1 | 0–3 | 2–1 | 1–3 | 2–1 |
| Queens Park Rangers | 0–5 | 2–3 | 0–1 | 3–3 | 1–0 | 0–1 | 3–2 | 2–0 | 1–2 | 1–4 | 1–1 | 2–0 | 3–0 | 0–2 | 0–0 | | 1–3 | 0–0 | 1–0 | 0–0 | 0–2 | 0–1 |
| Sheffield United | 1–1 | 4–0 | 2–1 | 1–1 | 4–4 | 2–0 | 1–0 | 1–1 | 3–1 | 5–0 | 0–1 | 2–2 | 2–2 | 1–1 | 1–0 | 1–1 | | 2–0 | 0–1 | 1–1 | 2–1 | 0–0 |
| Sheffield Wednesday | 2–0 | 2–0 | 1–1 | 3–3 | 1–0 | 1–1 | 4–2 | 1–1 | 4–0 | 6–2 | 5–2 | 3–1 | 1–1 | 2–4 | 0–1 | 1–0 | 2–1 | | 2–2 | 3–0 | 0–0 | 2–1 |
| Southampton | 0–0 | 3–1 | 3–1 | 2–3 | 4–1 | 3–1 | 1–0 | 1–1 | 1–2 | 5–0 | 2–1 | 5–3 | 2–1 | 3–3 | 1–0 | 1–2 | 1–0 | 1–0 | | 1–2 | 1–1 | 3–2 |
| Swansea Town | 4–0 | 2–0 | 2–0 | 3–0 | 1–2 | 5–1 | 0–2 | 1–2 | 2–1 | 1–2 | 1–2 | 0–0 | 0–0 | 2–2 | 2–1 | 0–1 | 1–0 | 1–2 | 4–0 | | 1–0 | 1–0 |
| Tottenham Hotspur | 2–0 | 2–3 | 5–0 | 1–1 | 3–1 | 2–0 | 1–0 | 3–1 | 1–2 | 0–0 | 2–0 | 0–2 | 0–0 | 4–1 | 3–2 | 3–0 | 7–0 | 1–0 | 4–0 | 3–1 | | 4–1 |
| West Ham United | 2–1 | 0–2 | 1–0 | 2–2 | 4–0 | 0–1 | 1–1 | 0–1 | 4–3 | 2–1 | 3–1 | 2–2 | 0–0 | 2–2 | 0–3 | 1–0 | 0–0 | 2–2 | 1–2 | 3–0 | 0–1 | |

Updated to match(es) played on unknown. Source: Ian Laschke: Rothmans Book of Football League Records 1888–89 to 1978–79. Macdonald and Jane’s, London & Sydney, 1980.
Legend: Blue = home team win; Yellow = draw; Red = away team win.

=== Maps ===
Locations of the Football League Second Division London teams 1949–1950
Locations of the Football League Second Division 1949–1950 teams

== Third Division North ==
Football League Third Division North
- Season: 1949–50
- Champions: Doncaster Rovers (3rd title)
- Failed re-election: none
- Matches: 462
- Goals: 1,315 (2.85 per match)
- Top goalscorer: Reg Philips (Crewe Alexandra), Peter Doherty (Doncaster Rovers), 26

| Pos | Team | Pld | W | D | L | GF | GA | GAv | Pts | Promotion |
|---|---|---|---|---|---|---|---|---|---|---|
| 1 | Doncaster Rovers (C, P) | 42 | 19 | 17 | 6 | 66 | 38 | 1.737 | 55 | Promotion to the Second Division |
| 2 | Gateshead | 42 | 23 | 7 | 12 | 87 | 54 | 1.611 | 53 | |
| 3 | Rochdale | 42 | 21 | 9 | 12 | 68 | 41 | 1.659 | 51 | |
| 4 | Lincoln City | 42 | 21 | 9 | 12 | 60 | 39 | 1.538 | 51 | |
| 5 | Tranmere Rovers | 42 | 19 | 11 | 12 | 51 | 48 | 1.063 | 49 | |
| 6 | Rotherham United | 42 | 19 | 10 | 13 | 80 | 59 | 1.356 | 48 | |
| 7 | Crewe Alexandra | 42 | 17 | 14 | 11 | 68 | 55 | 1.236 | 48 | |
| 8 | Mansfield Town | 42 | 18 | 12 | 12 | 66 | 54 | 1.222 | 48 | |
| 9 | Carlisle United | 42 | 16 | 15 | 11 | 68 | 51 | 1.333 | 47 | |
| 10 | Stockport County | 42 | 19 | 7 | 16 | 55 | 52 | 1.058 | 45 | |
| 11 | Oldham Athletic | 42 | 16 | 11 | 15 | 58 | 63 | 0.921 | 43 | |
| 12 | Chester | 42 | 17 | 6 | 19 | 70 | 79 | 0.886 | 40 | |
| 13 | Accrington Stanley | 42 | 16 | 7 | 19 | 57 | 62 | 0.919 | 39 | |
| 14 | New Brighton | 42 | 14 | 10 | 18 | 45 | 63 | 0.714 | 38 | |
| 15 | Barrow | 42 | 14 | 9 | 19 | 47 | 53 | 0.887 | 37 | |
| 16 | Southport | 42 | 12 | 13 | 17 | 51 | 71 | 0.718 | 37 | |
| 17 | Darlington | 42 | 11 | 13 | 18 | 56 | 69 | 0.812 | 35 | |
| 18 | Hartlepools United | 42 | 14 | 5 | 23 | 52 | 79 | 0.658 | 33 | |
| 19 | Bradford City | 42 | 12 | 8 | 22 | 61 | 76 | 0.803 | 32 | |
| 20 | Wrexham | 42 | 10 | 12 | 20 | 39 | 54 | 0.722 | 32 | |
| 21 | Halifax Town | 42 | 12 | 8 | 22 | 58 | 85 | 0.682 | 32 | Re-elected |
| 22 | York City | 42 | 9 | 13 | 20 | 52 | 70 | 0.743 | 31 | Re-elected |

Source: rsssf.com
(C) Champions; (P) Promoted

=== Results ===
| Home \ Away | ACC | BRW | BRA | CRL | CHE | CRE | DAR | DON | GAT | HAL | HAR | LIN | MAN | NWB | OLD | ROC | ROT | SOU | STP | TRA | WRE | YOR |
|---|---|---|---|---|---|---|---|---|---|---|---|---|---|---|---|---|---|---|---|---|---|---|
| Accrington Stanley | | 1–0 | 3–2 | 1–1 | 4–0 | 1–1 | 3–0 | 2–2 | 0–1 | 1–0 | 1–2 | 2–0 | 2–2 | 3–0 | 3–4 | 1–0 | 1–4 | 4–0 | 4–2 | 2–0 | 2–0 | 0–0 |
| Barrow | 2–1 | | 1–0 | 1–3 | 3–1 | 0–1 | 2–1 | 1–1 | 1–1 | 4–0 | 0–0 | 0–0 | 0–1 | 1–1 | 3–1 | 0–1 | 1–1 | 1–0 | 0–1 | 1–2 | 2–1 | 3–2 |
| Bradford City | 5–2 | 3–2 | | 3–2 | 1–0 | 0–2 | 4–1 | 1–2 | 2–1 | 1–3 | 1–3 | 0–1 | 2–1 | 2–1 | 1–1 | 2–1 | 1–2 | 6–0 | 0–1 | 2–4 | 1–0 | 0–2 |
| Carlisle United | 2–1 | 2–0 | 3–0 | | 5–1 | 2–2 | 0–1 | 0–0 | 4–2 | 0–2 | 2–1 | 0–2 | 1–1 | 0–0 | 3–0 | 2–0 | 3–1 | 3–3 | 2–0 | 0–0 | 1–0 | 4–3 |
| Chester | 1–0 | 1–0 | 4–1 | 2–4 | | 0–1 | 4–4 | 3–1 | 0–3 | 5–1 | 3–0 | 3–1 | 6–3 | 2–0 | 1–1 | 0–2 | 4–2 | 4–1 | 0–4 | 0–0 | 2–1 | 2–3 |
| Crewe Alexandra | 2–1 | 1–1 | 2–2 | 2–1 | 1–2 | | 2–0 | 0–2 | 3–1 | 6–3 | 1–0 | 3–2 | 1–1 | 1–2 | 1–1 | 0–1 | 4–1 | 1–2 | 1–0 | 2–0 | 1–1 | 3–3 |
| Darlington | 0–2 | 1–1 | 4–3 | 1–1 | 2–1 | 1–1 | | 2–1 | 2–3 | 5–1 | 1–0 | 2–0 | 2–2 | 3–1 | 1–1 | 1–1 | 2–1 | 0–2 | 1–1 | 0–2 | 3–1 | 1–1 |
| Doncaster Rovers | 4–1 | 1–0 | 1–1 | 0–0 | 2–0 | 0–2 | 2–1 | | 1–1 | 4–0 | 0–0 | 1–4 | 0–1 | 0–0 | 1–1 | 0–0 | 1–0 | 5–1 | 3–0 | 1–1 | 2–0 | 1–1 |
| Gateshead | 5–0 | 3–1 | 4–2 | 2–1 | 4–0 | 1–1 | 3–3 | 1–1 | | 7–1 | 2–0 | 2–1 | 0–1 | 2–1 | 2–0 | 1–3 | 2–2 | 3–2 | 1–0 | 5–1 | 0–1 | 1–1 |
| Halifax Town | 1–4 | 1–0 | 3–1 | 1–1 | 2–1 | 3–1 | 1–3 | 2–2 | 5–2 | | 1–2 | 0–1 | 0–3 | 3–0 | 1–1 | 3–2 | 4–3 | 0–0 | 3–1 | 0–1 | 0–0 | 1–2 |
| Hartlepools | 0–0 | 2–3 | 3–0 | 1–5 | 5–1 | 1–6 | 2–0 | 1–1 | 3–5 | 3–3 | | 2–1 | 1–3 | 2–0 | 0–2 | 1–2 | 1–2 | 1–0 | 1–0 | 2–0 | 3–1 | 2–0 |
| Lincoln City | 1–0 | 4–0 | 2–2 | 2–1 | 2–0 | 2–0 | 2–0 | 1–0 | 2–0 | 1–0 | 6–0 | | 1–0 | 1–2 | 1–2 | 2–0 | 0–0 | 1–1 | 1–1 | 0–0 | 2–0 | 1–0 |
| Mansfield Town | 2–0 | 1–1 | 0–2 | 4–1 | 0–2 | 3–0 | 2–1 | 1–2 | 1–0 | 1–0 | 7–1 | 2–1 | | 2–2 | 3–1 | 1–1 | 0–2 | 1–2 | 3–0 | 1–1 | 1–0 | 1–0 |
| New Brighton | 3–0 | 2–0 | 1–0 | 3–2 | 3–3 | 0–2 | 1–0 | 2–2 | 0–1 | 1–1 | 1–0 | 1–0 | 1–2 | | 0–0 | 0–4 | 0–3 | 1–0 | 1–3 | 0–0 | 3–1 | 3–1 |
| Oldham Athletic | 0–1 | 1–3 | 2–1 | 1–1 | 0–2 | 2–1 | 2–0 | 1–4 | 1–0 | 2–1 | 3–1 | 0–2 | 1–0 | 3–0 | | 0–0 | 2–2 | 2–5 | 3–3 | 2–1 | 2–3 | 2–0 |
| Rochdale | 2–0 | 2–1 | 2–2 | 1–0 | 0–1 | 2–1 | 2–0 | 0–1 | 1–3 | 1–0 | 4–0 | 2–0 | 7–1 | 4–0 | 1–0 | | 1–0 | 2–0 | 1–1 | 3–0 | 1–1 | 3–1 |
| Rotherham United | 6–0 | 1–2 | 5–2 | 1–1 | 3–2 | 0–0 | 1–1 | 0–2 | 1–2 | 2–1 | 5–1 | 1–3 | 2–2 | 3–0 | 0–1 | 4–3 | | 4–0 | 2–1 | 1–1 | 2–2 | 2–1 |
| Southport | 1–0 | 0–1 | 1–1 | 1–2 | 1–1 | 2–2 | 1–1 | 3–3 | 0–3 | 1–1 | 2–1 | 1–1 | 1–1 | 0–2 | 3–2 | 3–2 | 4–0 | | 1–0 | 2–1 | 0–0 | 1–1 |
| Stockport County | 1–0 | 1–3 | 1–0 | 2–0 | 3–0 | 4–1 | 2–1 | 0–1 | 2–1 | 2–0 | 1–0 | 1–1 | 1–0 | 0–2 | 1–3 | 1–1 | 0–2 | 3–2 | | 2–1 | 2–1 | 3–1 |
| Tranmere | 0–1 | 2–1 | 1–0 | 0–0 | 2–1 | 2–2 | 3–1 | 2–4 | 1–0 | 2–1 | 2–1 | 2–2 | 2–1 | 2–1 | 4–2 | 1–0 | 0–2 | 2–0 | 2–0 | | 2–1 | 1–0 |
| Wrexham | 1–1 | 1–0 | 0–0 | 1–1 | 1–1 | 1–2 | 2–1 | 0–1 | 0–1 | 2–3 | 1–0 | 4–0 | 0–0 | 2–2 | 2–1 | 3–0 | 0–1 | 1–0 | 0–2 | 0–0 | | 2–0 |
| York City | 2–1 | 2–0 | 1–1 | 1–1 | 2–3 | 1–1 | 1–1 | 0–3 | 1–5 | 3–1 | 0–2 | 1–2 | 3–3 | 2–1 | 0–1 | 2–2 | 0–3 | 0–1 | 1–1 | 1–0 | 5–0 | |

Updated to match(es) played on unknown. Source: Ian Laschke: Rothmans Book of Football League Records 1888–89 to 1978–79. Macdonald and Jane’s, London & Sydney, 1980.
Legend: Blue = home team win; Yellow = draw; Red = away team win.

=== Maps ===
Locations of the Football League Third Division North teams 1949–1950

== Third Division South ==
Football League Third Division South
- Season: 1949–50
- Champions: Notts County (2nd title)
- Failed re-election: none
- Matches: 462
- Goals: 1,336 (2.89 per match)
- Top goalscorer: Tommy Lawton (Notts County), 31

| Pos | Team | Pld | W | D | L | GF | GA | GAv | Pts | Promotion |
|---|---|---|---|---|---|---|---|---|---|---|
| 1 | Notts County (C, P) | 42 | 25 | 8 | 9 | 95 | 50 | 1.900 | 58 | Promotion to the Second Division |
| 2 | Northampton Town | 42 | 20 | 11 | 11 | 72 | 50 | 1.440 | 51 | |
| 3 | Southend United | 42 | 19 | 13 | 10 | 66 | 48 | 1.375 | 51 | |
| 4 | Nottingham Forest | 42 | 20 | 9 | 13 | 67 | 39 | 1.718 | 49 | |
| 5 | Torquay United | 42 | 19 | 10 | 13 | 66 | 63 | 1.048 | 48 | |
| 6 | Watford | 42 | 16 | 13 | 13 | 45 | 35 | 1.286 | 45 | |
| 7 | Crystal Palace | 42 | 15 | 14 | 13 | 55 | 54 | 1.019 | 44 | |
| 8 | Brighton & Hove Albion | 42 | 16 | 12 | 14 | 57 | 69 | 0.826 | 44 | |
| 9 | Bristol Rovers | 42 | 19 | 5 | 18 | 51 | 51 | 1.000 | 43 | |
| 10 | Reading | 42 | 17 | 8 | 17 | 70 | 64 | 1.094 | 42 | |
| 11 | Norwich City | 42 | 16 | 10 | 16 | 65 | 63 | 1.032 | 42 | |
| 12 | Bournemouth & Boscombe Athletic | 42 | 16 | 10 | 16 | 57 | 56 | 1.018 | 42 | |
| 13 | Port Vale | 42 | 15 | 11 | 16 | 47 | 42 | 1.119 | 41 | |
| 14 | Swindon Town | 42 | 15 | 11 | 16 | 59 | 62 | 0.952 | 41 | |
| 15 | Bristol City | 42 | 15 | 10 | 17 | 60 | 61 | 0.984 | 40 | |
| 16 | Exeter City | 42 | 14 | 11 | 17 | 63 | 75 | 0.840 | 39 | |
| 17 | Ipswich Town | 42 | 12 | 11 | 19 | 57 | 86 | 0.663 | 35 | |
| 18 | Leyton Orient | 42 | 12 | 11 | 19 | 53 | 85 | 0.624 | 35 | |
| 19 | Walsall | 42 | 9 | 16 | 17 | 61 | 62 | 0.984 | 34 | |
| 20 | Aldershot | 42 | 13 | 8 | 21 | 48 | 60 | 0.800 | 34 | |
| 21 | Newport County | 42 | 13 | 8 | 21 | 67 | 98 | 0.684 | 34 | Re-elected |
| 22 | Millwall | 42 | 14 | 4 | 24 | 55 | 63 | 0.873 | 32 | Re-elected |

(C) Champions; (P) Promoted

=== Results ===
| Home \ Away | ALD | B&BA | B&HA | BRI | BRR | CRY | EXE | IPS | LEY | MIL | NPC | NOR | NWC | NOT | NTC | PTV | REA | STD | SWI | TOR | WAL | WAT |
|---|---|---|---|---|---|---|---|---|---|---|---|---|---|---|---|---|---|---|---|---|---|---|
| Aldershot | | 0–1 | 0–1 | 0–1 | 3–1 | 0–0 | 1–2 | 5–0 | 2–0 | 2–1 | 4–1 | 0–0 | 2–0 | 1–1 | 2–0 | 1–0 | 2–0 | 1–1 | 0–0 | 3–5 | 1–0 | 0–1 |
| Bournemouth & Boscombe Athletic | 2–1 | | 2–2 | 3–1 | 0–2 | 2–0 | 2–0 | 4–0 | 4–1 | 1–0 | 1–1 | 1–2 | 2–0 | 1–2 | 3–0 | 2–2 | 2–1 | 3–0 | 1–1 | 1–2 | 1–1 | 0–0 |
| Brighton & Hove Albion | 1–1 | 1–1 | | 2–1 | 1–2 | 0–0 | 0–0 | 2–1 | 2–2 | 1–0 | 5–0 | 1–1 | 1–3 | 2–2 | 2–3 | 2–1 | 2–1 | 2–1 | 0–1 | 2–1 | 1–1 | 2–1 |
| Bristol City | 2–0 | 3–2 | 1–2 | | 1–2 | 2–0 | 1–0 | 4–2 | 0–0 | 2–1 | 6–0 | 3–1 | 1–2 | 0–2 | 4–0 | 2–0 | 2–2 | 1–1 | 1–0 | 0–0 | 2–1 | 0–1 |
| Bristol Rovers | 2–1 | 0–0 | 3–0 | 2–3 | | 0–0 | 1–0 | 2–0 | 3–0 | 3–1 | 3–0 | 0–0 | 5–1 | 0–3 | 0–3 | 2–1 | 2–1 | 1–1 | 2–0 | 2–0 | 1–1 | 0–2 |
| Crystal Palace | 2–1 | 1–0 | 6–0 | 1–1 | 1–0 | | 5–3 | 2–0 | 1–1 | 1–0 | 1–0 | 0–4 | 2–0 | 1–1 | 1–2 | 0–1 | 1–1 | 2–1 | 2–2 | 1–3 | 2–0 | 2–0 |
| Exeter City | 1–0 | 1–2 | 2–3 | 0–0 | 2–0 | 2–1 | | 1–1 | 1–1 | 2–1 | 3–3 | 1–3 | 3–1 | 0–0 | 2–2 | 3–1 | 3–4 | 1–1 | 3–0 | 1–1 | 2–1 | 3–1 |
| Ipswich Town | 1–0 | 1–2 | 2–2 | 0–0 | 3–1 | 4–4 | 1–0 | | 4–4 | 0–3 | 1–0 | 2–2 | 3–0 | 1–2 | 0–4 | 2–1 | 2–0 | 1–3 | 3–1 | 3–1 | 1–5 | 1–1 |
| Leyton Orient | 2–7 | 2–1 | 0–1 | 1–0 | 1–0 | 2–2 | 4–1 | 4–0 | | 1–1 | 2–1 | 1–0 | 1–2 | 1–1 | 1–4 | 1–0 | 2–1 | 2–2 | 1–3 | 2–1 | 2–2 | 0–0 |
| Millwall | 3–0 | 1–0 | 5–1 | 3–1 | 0–1 | 2–3 | 3–1 | 3–1 | 3–1 | | 1–2 | 0–2 | 1–2 | 2–1 | 1–3 | 3–0 | 3–1 | 1–2 | 1–0 | 1–3 | 1–1 | 1–3 |
| Newport County | 6–0 | 5–0 | 0–1 | 6–4 | 2–3 | 2–2 | 1–2 | 1–0 | 3–2 | 4–3 | | 1–4 | 3–2 | 4–1 | 1–1 | 1–1 | 1–1 | 2–1 | 1–2 | 1–0 | 2–1 | 3–3 |
| Northampton Town | 1–1 | 2–3 | 2–1 | 4–2 | 2–0 | 2–2 | 3–3 | 1–2 | 3–0 | 1–0 | 4–3 | | 3–1 | 0–0 | 5–1 | 1–1 | 2–0 | 2–0 | 0–1 | 3–0 | 2–0 | 0–0 |
| Norwich City | 4–0 | 0–1 | 1–2 | 3–0 | 4–0 | 2–0 | 1–2 | 1–1 | 4–0 | 0–2 | 4–0 | 2–1 | | 1–1 | 4–3 | 0–1 | 1–1 | 0–0 | 4–0 | 3–3 | 3–2 | 2–1 |
| Nottingham Forest | 3–0 | 3–0 | 0–1 | 3–0 | 2–0 | 2–0 | 5–0 | 2–0 | 2–1 | 3–1 | 3–0 | 0–1 | 0–1 | | 1–2 | 2–0 | 1–2 | 1–2 | 2–1 | 1–2 | 1–0 | 0–1 |
| Notts County | 3–1 | 2–0 | 4–2 | 4–1 | 2–0 | 0–1 | 3–3 | 2–0 | 7–1 | 2–0 | 7–0 | 2–0 | 5–0 | 2–0 | | 3–1 | 4–0 | 2–0 | 3–0 | 1–1 | 1–1 | 1–0 |
| Port Vale | 0–1 | 1–1 | 3–0 | 0–2 | 1–0 | 2–0 | 1–0 | 2–2 | 2–0 | 4–0 | 1–0 | 3–1 | 2–2 | 1–1 | 3–1 | | 1–1 | 0–0 | 0–1 | 2–0 | 2–0 | 2–0 |
| Reading | 1–3 | 2–1 | 3–0 | 1–0 | 0–1 | 1–2 | 3–2 | 3–1 | 5–1 | 2–0 | 4–1 | 3–1 | 4–1 | 1–1 | 0–1 | 2–1 | | 5–0 | 4–3 | 2–0 | 1–1 | 1–0 |
| Southend | 3–0 | 1–0 | 3–2 | 2–0 | 3–1 | 0–0 | 1–0 | 2–2 | 2–0 | 3–0 | 6–0 | 1–2 | 1–0 | 2–3 | 2–0 | 1–0 | 3–2 | | 2–0 | 2–0 | 2–2 | 1–1 |
| Swindon Town | 2–1 | 3–1 | 4–2 | 1–1 | 1–0 | 4–2 | 7–1 | 0–3 | 0–1 | 1–1 | 1–1 | 6–1 | 1–1 | 0–5 | 1–1 | 0–0 | 2–0 | 2–2 | | 1–2 | 4–3 | 0–1 |
| Torquay United | 4–0 | 3–1 | 0–0 | 3–3 | 1–0 | 1–0 | 1–4 | 2–2 | 4–1 | 1–0 | 5–3 | 1–0 | 1–1 | 2–0 | 0–0 | 0–0 | 4–2 | 2–4 | 1–0 | | 2–1 | 2–1 |
| Walsall | 0–0 | 1–1 | 4–2 | 1–1 | 3–1 | 3–1 | 3–0 | 1–3 | 1–2 | 0–1 | 2–0 | 1–3 | 1–1 | 1–3 | 3–3 | 1–0 | 2–0 | 1–1 | 0–0 | 7–1 | | 1–1 |
| Watford | 1–0 | 4–1 | 0–0 | 2–0 | 0–2 | 0–0 | 1–2 | 6–0 | 2–1 | 0–0 | 0–1 | 0–0 | 0–0 | 1–0 | 2–1 | 0–2 | 1–1 | 1–0 | 1–2 | 1–0 | 3–0 | |

Updated to match(es) played on unknown. Source: Ian Laschke: Rothmans Book of Football League Records 1888–89 to 1978–79. Macdonald and Jane’s, London & Sydney, 1980.
Legend: Blue = home team win; Yellow = draw; Red = away team win.

=== Maps ===
Locations of the Football League Third Division South London teams 1949–1950
Locations of the Football League Third Division South teams 1949–1950

== Attendances ==
=== Division One ===
| No. | Club | Average |
|---|---|---|
| 1 | Arsenal FC | 49,001 |
| 2 | Sunderland AFC | 47,785 |
| 3 | Newcastle United FC | 46,468 |
| 4 | Liverpool FC | 45,783 |
| 5 | Wolverhampton Wanderers FC | 45,466 |
| 6 | Everton FC | 43,932 |
| 7 | Manchester United | 43,282 |
| 8 | Aston Villa FC | 42,677 |
| 9 | Chelsea FC | 42,238 |
| 10 | Manchester City FC | 39,381 |
| 11 | West Bromwich Albion FC | 38,910 |
| 12 | Portsmouth FC | 37,004 |
| 13 | Middlesbrough FC | 35,407 |
| 14 | Charlton Athletic FC | 34,567 |
| 15 | Birmingham City FC | 34,511 |
| 16 | Fulham FC | 33,030 |
| 17 | Bolton Wanderers FC | 29,789 |
| 18 | Burnley FC | 27,631 |
| 19 | Stoke City FC | 27,215 |
| 20 | Blackpool FC | 26,336 |
| 21 | Derby County FC | 26,283 |
| 22 | Huddersfield Town AFC | 23,542 |

=== Division Two ===
| No. | Club | Average |
|---|---|---|
| 1 | Tottenham Hotspur FC | 54,111 |
| 2 | Sheffield Wednesday FC | 40,692 |
| 3 | Hull City AFC | 37,319 |
| 4 | Sheffield United FC | 30,764 |
| 5 | Leicester City FC | 30,266 |
| 6 | Leeds United FC | 30,203 |
| 7 | Cardiff City FC | 28,680 |
| 8 | Preston North End FC | 28,164 |
| 9 | Southampton FC | 23,894 |
| 10 | Coventry City FC | 22,822 |
| 11 | Brentford FC | 22,613 |
| 12 | Blackburn Rovers FC | 22,351 |
| 13 | West Ham United FC | 22,233 |
| 14 | Plymouth Argyle FC | 21,693 |
| 15 | Swansea City AFC | 21,571 |
| 16 | Queens Park Rangers FC | 19,281 |
| 17 | Barnsley FC | 18,286 |
| 18 | Grimsby Town FC | 18,056 |
| 19 | Bury FC | 16,821 |
| 20 | Luton Town FC | 16,036 |
| 21 | Bradford Park Avenue AFC | 15,885 |
| 22 | Chesterfield FC | 14,047 |

=== Division Three ===
| No. | Club | Average |
|---|---|---|
| 1 | Notts County FC | 35,176 |
| 2 | Norwich City FC | 23,264 |
| 3 | Nottingham Forest FC | 22,148 |
| 4 | Bristol City FC | 21,449 |
| 5 | Millwall FC | 20,753 |
| 6 | Doncaster Rovers FC | 18,252 |
| 7 | Crystal Palace FC | 16,874 |
| 8 | Bristol Rovers FC | 16,105 |
| 9 | Reading FC | 15,427 |
| 10 | Oldham Athletic FC | 15,185 |
| 11 | AFC Bournemouth | 14,559 |
| 12 | Brighton & Hove Albion FC | 14,120 |
| 13 | Swindon Town FC | 14,075 |
| 14 | Ipswich Town FC | 13,320 |
| 15 | Bradford City AFC | 13,158 |
| 16 | Port Vale FC | 12,983 |
| 17 | Northampton Town FC | 12,791 |
| 18 | Leyton Orient FC | 12,585 |
| 19 | Lincoln City FC | 12,418 |
| 20 | Watford FC | 12,161 |
| 21 | Mansfield Town FC | 12,128 |
| 22 | Southend United FC | 12,089 |
| 23 | Stockport County FC | 12,013 |
| 24 | Carlisle United FC | 11,809 |
| 25 | Newport County AFC | 11,535 |
| 26 | Rotherham United FC | 10,160 |
| 27 | Exeter City FC | 10,117 |
| 28 | Walsall FC | 10,099 |
| 29 | Gateshead AFC | 9,201 |
| 30 | Crewe Alexandra FC | 9,065 |
| 31 | Tranmere Rovers | 9,026 |
| 32 | Torquay United FC | 8,779 |
| 33 | Rochdale AFC | 8,372 |
| 34 | Wrexham AFC | 8,339 |
| 35 | Southport FC | 7,829 |
| 36 | York City FC | 7,776 |
| 37 | Hartlepool United FC | 7,705 |
| 38 | Darlington FC | 7,312 |
| 39 | Aldershot Town FC | 7,098 |
| 40 | Halifax Town AFC | 6,941 |
| 41 | Chester City FC | 6,695 |
| 42 | Barrow AFC | 5,946 |
| 43 | Accrington Stanley FC | 5,891 |
| 44 | New Brighton AFC | 5,458 |

== See also ==
- 1949-50 in English football
- 1949 in association football
- 1950 in association football
