= 1949–50 in English football =

Football in England
- Season: 1949–50

Men's football
- First Division: Portsmouth
- Second Division: Tottenham
- FA Cup: Arsenal

The 1949–50 season was the 70th season of competitive football in England.

== Overview ==
Portsmouth retained the First Division title by one of the narrowest margins in history ahead of Wolverhampton Wanderers F.C.

An event that was much talked about in the city of Sheffield for many years was the way the promotion race from the Second Division was won. Going into the last game of the season, Sheffield Wednesday needed to beat Tottenham Hotspur to clinch promotion at the expense of their local rivals Sheffield United. The resulting 0–0 draw meant Wednesday won promotion by a goal average difference of just 0.008 – a 1–1 draw would have left the two great rivals level on points and goal average, and a unique play-off match would have had to be played.

Joe Mercer captained the winning Arsenal team in the FA Cup and was named FWA Footballer of the Year.

Manchester United returned to a rebuilt Old Trafford eight years after it had been damaged by the Luftwaffe, but failed to win any silverware this season.

== Honours ==
| Competition | Winner | Runner-up |
|---|---|---|
| First Division | Portsmouth (2) | Wolverhampton Wanderers |
| Second Division | Tottenham Hotspur | Sheffield Wednesday |
| Third Division North | Doncaster Rovers | Gateshead |
| Third Division South | Notts County | Northampton Town |
| FA Cup | Arsenal (3) | Liverpool |
| Charity Shield | Portsmouth and Wolverhampton Wanderers (shared) | |
| Home Championship | England | Scotland |

Notes = Number in parentheses is the times that club has won that honour. * indicates new record for competition

== Football League ==
=== First Division ===
| Pos | Team | Pld | W | D | L | GF | GA | GAv | Pts | Relegation |
|---|---|---|---|---|---|---|---|---|---|---|
| 1 | Portsmouth (C) | 42 | 22 | 9 | 11 | 74 | 38 | 1.947 | 53 | |
| 2 | Wolverhampton Wanderers | 42 | 20 | 13 | 9 | 76 | 49 | 1.551 | 53 | |
| 3 | Sunderland | 42 | 21 | 10 | 11 | 83 | 62 | 1.339 | 52 | |
| 4 | Manchester United | 42 | 18 | 14 | 10 | 69 | 44 | 1.568 | 50 | |
| 5 | Newcastle United | 42 | 19 | 12 | 11 | 77 | 55 | 1.400 | 50 | |
| 6 | Arsenal | 42 | 19 | 11 | 12 | 79 | 55 | 1.436 | 49 | |
| 7 | Blackpool | 42 | 17 | 15 | 10 | 46 | 35 | 1.314 | 49 | |
| 8 | Liverpool | 42 | 17 | 14 | 11 | 64 | 54 | 1.185 | 48 | |
| 9 | Middlesbrough | 42 | 20 | 7 | 15 | 59 | 48 | 1.229 | 47 | |
| 10 | Burnley | 42 | 16 | 13 | 13 | 40 | 40 | 1.000 | 45 | |
| 11 | Derby County | 42 | 17 | 10 | 15 | 69 | 61 | 1.131 | 44 | |
| 12 | Aston Villa | 42 | 15 | 12 | 15 | 61 | 61 | 1.000 | 42 | |
| 13 | Chelsea | 42 | 12 | 16 | 14 | 58 | 65 | 0.892 | 40 | |
| 14 | West Bromwich Albion | 42 | 14 | 12 | 16 | 47 | 53 | 0.887 | 40 | |
| 15 | Huddersfield Town | 42 | 14 | 9 | 19 | 52 | 73 | 0.712 | 37 | |
| 16 | Bolton Wanderers | 42 | 10 | 14 | 18 | 45 | 59 | 0.763 | 34 | |
| 17 | Fulham | 42 | 10 | 14 | 18 | 41 | 54 | 0.759 | 34 | |
| 18 | Everton | 42 | 10 | 14 | 18 | 42 | 66 | 0.636 | 34 | |
| 19 | Stoke City | 42 | 11 | 12 | 19 | 45 | 75 | 0.600 | 34 | |
| 20 | Charlton Athletic | 42 | 13 | 6 | 23 | 53 | 65 | 0.815 | 32 | |
| 21 | Manchester City (R) | 42 | 8 | 13 | 21 | 36 | 68 | 0.529 | 29 | Relegation to the Second Division |
| 22 | Birmingham City (R) | 42 | 7 | 14 | 21 | 31 | 67 | 0.463 | 28 | Relegation to the Second Division |

Source: World Football
Rules for classification: 1) Points; 2) Goal average; 3) Goals scored
(C) Champions; (R) Relegated

=== Second Division ===
| Pos | Team | Pld | W | D | L | GF | GA | GAv | Pts | Qualification or relegation |
|---|---|---|---|---|---|---|---|---|---|---|
| 1 | Tottenham Hotspur (C, P) | 42 | 27 | 7 | 8 | 81 | 35 | 2.314 | 61 | Promotion to the First Division |
| 2 | Sheffield Wednesday (P) | 42 | 18 | 16 | 8 | 67 | 48 | 1.396 | 52 | Promotion to the First Division |
| 3 | Sheffield United | 42 | 19 | 14 | 9 | 68 | 49 | 1.388 | 52 | |
| 4 | Southampton | 42 | 19 | 14 | 9 | 64 | 48 | 1.333 | 52 | |
| 5 | Leeds United | 42 | 17 | 13 | 12 | 54 | 45 | 1.200 | 47 | |
| 6 | Preston North End | 42 | 18 | 9 | 15 | 60 | 49 | 1.224 | 45 | |
| 7 | Hull City | 42 | 17 | 11 | 14 | 64 | 72 | 0.889 | 45 | |
| 8 | Swansea Town | 42 | 17 | 9 | 16 | 53 | 49 | 1.082 | 43 | |
| 9 | Brentford | 42 | 15 | 13 | 14 | 44 | 49 | 0.898 | 43 | |
| 10 | Cardiff City | 42 | 16 | 10 | 16 | 41 | 44 | 0.932 | 42 | |
| 11 | Grimsby Town | 42 | 16 | 8 | 18 | 74 | 73 | 1.014 | 40 | |
| 12 | Coventry City | 42 | 13 | 13 | 16 | 55 | 55 | 1.000 | 39 | |
| 13 | Barnsley | 42 | 13 | 13 | 16 | 64 | 67 | 0.955 | 39 | |
| 14 | Chesterfield | 42 | 15 | 9 | 18 | 43 | 47 | 0.915 | 39 | |
| 15 | Leicester City | 42 | 12 | 15 | 15 | 55 | 65 | 0.846 | 39 | |
| 16 | Blackburn Rovers | 42 | 14 | 10 | 18 | 55 | 60 | 0.917 | 38 | |
| 17 | Luton Town | 42 | 10 | 18 | 14 | 41 | 51 | 0.804 | 38 | |
| 18 | Bury | 42 | 14 | 9 | 19 | 60 | 65 | 0.923 | 37 | |
| 19 | West Ham United | 42 | 12 | 12 | 18 | 53 | 61 | 0.869 | 36 | |
| 20 | Queens Park Rangers | 42 | 11 | 12 | 19 | 40 | 57 | 0.702 | 34 | |
| 21 | Plymouth Argyle (R) | 42 | 8 | 16 | 18 | 44 | 65 | 0.677 | 32 | Relegation to the Third Division South |
| 22 | Bradford (Park Avenue) (R) | 42 | 10 | 11 | 21 | 51 | 77 | 0.662 | 31 | Relegation to the Third Division North |

Rules for classification: 1) Points; 2) Goal average; 3) Goals scored
(C) Champions; (P) Promoted; (R) Relegated

=== Third Division North ===
| Pos | Team | Pld | W | D | L | GF | GA | GAv | Pts | Promotion |
|---|---|---|---|---|---|---|---|---|---|---|
| 1 | Doncaster Rovers (C, P) | 42 | 19 | 17 | 6 | 66 | 38 | 1.737 | 55 | Promotion to the Second Division |
| 2 | Gateshead | 42 | 23 | 7 | 12 | 87 | 54 | 1.611 | 53 | |
| 3 | Rochdale | 42 | 21 | 9 | 12 | 68 | 41 | 1.659 | 51 | |
| 4 | Lincoln City | 42 | 21 | 9 | 12 | 60 | 39 | 1.538 | 51 | |
| 5 | Tranmere Rovers | 42 | 19 | 11 | 12 | 51 | 48 | 1.063 | 49 | |
| 6 | Rotherham United | 42 | 19 | 10 | 13 | 80 | 59 | 1.356 | 48 | |
| 7 | Crewe Alexandra | 42 | 17 | 14 | 11 | 68 | 55 | 1.236 | 48 | |
| 8 | Mansfield Town | 42 | 18 | 12 | 12 | 66 | 54 | 1.222 | 48 | |
| 9 | Carlisle United | 42 | 16 | 15 | 11 | 68 | 51 | 1.333 | 47 | |
| 10 | Stockport County | 42 | 19 | 7 | 16 | 55 | 52 | 1.058 | 45 | |
| 11 | Oldham Athletic | 42 | 16 | 11 | 15 | 58 | 63 | 0.921 | 43 | |
| 12 | Chester | 42 | 17 | 6 | 19 | 70 | 79 | 0.886 | 40 | |
| 13 | Accrington Stanley | 42 | 16 | 7 | 19 | 57 | 62 | 0.919 | 39 | |
| 14 | New Brighton | 42 | 14 | 10 | 18 | 45 | 63 | 0.714 | 38 | |
| 15 | Barrow | 42 | 14 | 9 | 19 | 47 | 53 | 0.887 | 37 | |
| 16 | Southport | 42 | 12 | 13 | 17 | 51 | 71 | 0.718 | 37 | |
| 17 | Darlington | 42 | 11 | 13 | 18 | 56 | 69 | 0.812 | 35 | |
| 18 | Hartlepools United | 42 | 14 | 5 | 23 | 52 | 79 | 0.658 | 33 | |
| 19 | Bradford City | 42 | 12 | 8 | 22 | 61 | 76 | 0.803 | 32 | |
| 20 | Wrexham | 42 | 10 | 12 | 20 | 39 | 54 | 0.722 | 32 | |
| 21 | Halifax Town | 42 | 12 | 8 | 22 | 58 | 85 | 0.682 | 32 | Re-elected |
| 22 | York City | 42 | 9 | 13 | 20 | 52 | 70 | 0.743 | 31 | Re-elected |

Source: rsssf.com
(C) Champions; (P) Promoted

=== Third Division South ===
| Pos | Team | Pld | W | D | L | GF | GA | GAv | Pts | Promotion |
|---|---|---|---|---|---|---|---|---|---|---|
| 1 | Notts County (C, P) | 42 | 25 | 8 | 9 | 95 | 50 | 1.900 | 58 | Promotion to the Second Division |
| 2 | Northampton Town | 42 | 20 | 11 | 11 | 72 | 50 | 1.440 | 51 | |
| 3 | Southend United | 42 | 19 | 13 | 10 | 66 | 48 | 1.375 | 51 | |
| 4 | Nottingham Forest | 42 | 20 | 9 | 13 | 67 | 39 | 1.718 | 49 | |
| 5 | Torquay United | 42 | 19 | 10 | 13 | 66 | 63 | 1.048 | 48 | |
| 6 | Watford | 42 | 16 | 13 | 13 | 45 | 35 | 1.286 | 45 | |
| 7 | Crystal Palace | 42 | 15 | 14 | 13 | 55 | 54 | 1.019 | 44 | |
| 8 | Brighton & Hove Albion | 42 | 16 | 12 | 14 | 57 | 69 | 0.826 | 44 | |
| 9 | Bristol Rovers | 42 | 19 | 5 | 18 | 51 | 51 | 1.000 | 43 | |
| 10 | Reading | 42 | 17 | 8 | 17 | 70 | 64 | 1.094 | 42 | |
| 11 | Norwich City | 42 | 16 | 10 | 16 | 65 | 63 | 1.032 | 42 | |
| 12 | Bournemouth & Boscombe Athletic | 42 | 16 | 10 | 16 | 57 | 56 | 1.018 | 42 | |
| 13 | Port Vale | 42 | 15 | 11 | 16 | 47 | 42 | 1.119 | 41 | |
| 14 | Swindon Town | 42 | 15 | 11 | 16 | 59 | 62 | 0.952 | 41 | |
| 15 | Bristol City | 42 | 15 | 10 | 17 | 60 | 61 | 0.984 | 40 | |
| 16 | Exeter City | 42 | 14 | 11 | 17 | 63 | 75 | 0.840 | 39 | |
| 17 | Ipswich Town | 42 | 12 | 11 | 19 | 57 | 86 | 0.663 | 35 | |
| 18 | Leyton Orient | 42 | 12 | 11 | 19 | 53 | 85 | 0.624 | 35 | |
| 19 | Walsall | 42 | 9 | 16 | 17 | 61 | 62 | 0.984 | 34 | |
| 20 | Aldershot | 42 | 13 | 8 | 21 | 48 | 60 | 0.800 | 34 | |
| 21 | Newport County | 42 | 13 | 8 | 21 | 67 | 98 | 0.684 | 34 | Re-elected |
| 22 | Millwall | 42 | 14 | 4 | 24 | 55 | 63 | 0.873 | 32 | Re-elected |

(C) Champions; (P) Promoted

=== Top goalscorers ===
First Division

- Dickie Davis (Sunderland) – 25 goals

Second Division

- Tommy Briggs (Grimsby Town) – 35 goals

Third Division North

- Reg Philips (Crewe Alexandra) and Peter Doherty (Doncaster Rovers) – 26 goals

Third Division South

- Tommy Lawton (Notts County) – 31 goals
