= 1950 in association football =

The following are the football (soccer) events of the year 1950 throughout the world.

== Events ==
- Olympique Lyon is founded
- RoPS Rovaniemi is founded

== Winners club national championship ==
- Argentina: Racing Club
- France: Bordeaux
- West Germany: VfB Stuttgart
- Iceland: KR
- Italy: Juventus
- Romania: Flamura Roșie Arad
- Scotland: Rangers
- (Spain) : Atlético Madrid
- Turkey: Fenerbahçe, Göztepe

== International tournaments ==
- 1950 British Home Championship (October 1, 1949 – May 25, 1950)

England

- FIFA World Cup in Brazil (June 24 – July 16, 1950)
  - Uruguay
  - Brazil
  - Sweden
  - Spain

== Births ==
- January 1 – Tony Currie, English footballer
- January 2 – Anatoli Ushanov, Russian footballer and coach (died 2017)
- January 13 – Gholam Hossein Mazloumi, Iranian international footballer and manager (died 2014)
- January 23 – Tom Vansittart, English retired professional footballer
- February 28 – Gerdo Hazelhekke, Dutch footballer
- April 3 – Petar Nikezić, Yugoslavian-Serbian international footballer (died 2014)
- April 8 – Grzegorz Lato, Polish international footballer
- April 20 – Tommy Berggren, Swedish footballer (died 2012)
- May 1 – Danny McGrain, Scottish international footballer
- May 5 – Brian Alderson, Scottish footballer (died 1997)
- May 23 – Ken Tiler, English former professional footballer
- July 1 – Steve Mackreth, Welsh former professional footballer
- July 5 – Carlos Caszely, Chilean international footballer
- September 7 – Mário Sérgio Pontes de Paiva, Brazilian international footballer and manager (died 2016)
- October 3 – Luděk Macela, Czech international footballer (died 2016)
- October 24 – Asa Hartford, Scottish international footballer
- November 29 – Dietmar Danner, German international footballer.

== Deaths ==
=== October ===
- October 5 – Juan Botasso, Argentine Goalkeeper, runner-up of the 1930 FIFA World Cup. (41)
