= 1975–76 Eredivisie =

20th season of the Eredivisie

Eredivisie
- Season: 1975–76
- Champions: PSV Eindhoven (6th title)
- Promoted: NEC; FC Eindhoven
- Relegated: MVV Maastricht; SBV Excelsior
- European Cup: PSV Eindhoven
- Cup Winners' Cup: Roda JC
- UEFA Cup: Feyenoord; AFC Ajax
- Goals: 866
- Average goals/game: 2.83
- Top goalscorer: (Netherlands) Ruud Geels; AFC Ajax 29 goals

The Dutch Eredivisie in the 1975–76 season was contested by 18 teams. PSV won the championship.

== League standings ==
| Pos | Team | Pld | W | D | L | GF | GA | GD | Pts | Qualification or relegation |
|---|---|---|---|---|---|---|---|---|---|---|
| 1 | PSV Eindhoven | 34 | 24 | 5 | 5 | 89 | 27 | +62 | 53 | Qualified for 1976–77 European Cup |
| 2 | Feyenoord | 34 | 23 | 6 | 5 | 88 | 40 | +48 | 52 | Qualified for 1976–77 UEFA Cup |
| 3 | AFC Ajax | 34 | 21 | 8 | 5 | 74 | 38 | +36 | 50 | Qualified for 1976–77 UEFA Cup |
| 4 | FC Twente | 34 | 19 | 8 | 7 | 64 | 32 | +32 | 46 | |
| 5 | AZ '67 | 34 | 15 | 9 | 10 | 46 | 39 | +7 | 39 | |
| 6 | FC Den Haag | 34 | 15 | 7 | 12 | 65 | 51 | +14 | 37 | |
| 7 | NEC | 34 | 11 | 15 | 8 | 43 | 38 | +5 | 37 | |
| 8 | Roda JC | 34 | 13 | 11 | 10 | 40 | 36 | +4 | 37 | Qualified for 1976–77 European Cup Winners' Cup (Note: PSV Eindhoven also won the KNVB Cup, thereby taking the double. They would participate in the European Cup, so finalists Roda JC could play in the Cup Winners' Cup.) |
| 9 | Telstar | 34 | 7 | 15 | 12 | 42 | 48 | −6 | 29 | |
| 10 | Sparta Rotterdam | 34 | 7 | 15 | 12 | 32 | 42 | −10 | 29 | |
| 11 | NAC | 34 | 9 | 10 | 15 | 26 | 53 | −27 | 28 | |
| 12 | De Graafschap | 34 | 7 | 14 | 13 | 41 | 69 | −28 | 28 | |
| 13 | Go Ahead Eagles | 34 | 6 | 15 | 13 | 43 | 58 | −15 | 27 | |
| 14 | FC Utrecht | 34 | 9 | 9 | 16 | 36 | 57 | −21 | 27 | |
| 15 | FC Eindhoven | 34 | 9 | 9 | 16 | 40 | 63 | −23 | 27 | |
| 16 | FC Amsterdam | 34 | 7 | 10 | 17 | 39 | 52 | −13 | 24 | |
| 17 | MVV Maastricht | 34 | 8 | 7 | 19 | 34 | 64 | −30 | 23 | Relegated to Eerste Divisie |
| 18 | SBV Excelsior | 34 | 7 | 5 | 22 | 24 | 59 | −35 | 19 | Relegated to Eerste Divisie |

== Results ==
| Home \ Away | AJA | AMS | AZ | EVV | EXC | FEY | GAE | GRA | DHA | MVV | NAC | NEC | PSV | RJC | SPA | TEL | TWE | UTR |
|---|---|---|---|---|---|---|---|---|---|---|---|---|---|---|---|---|---|---|
| Ajax | | 2–0 | 2–0 | 2–0 | 2–0 | 6–0 | 4–1 | 3–0 | 0–0 | 2–0 | 5–0 | 6–3 | 1–3 | 2–1 | 2–0 | 2–1 | 5–3 | 5–1 |
| FC Amsterdam | 0–2 | | 0–0 | 3–4 | 0–0 | 1–2 | 6–2 | 1–0 | 3–1 | 0–0 | 2–1 | 1–1 | 0–2 | 0–1 | 0–1 | 0–0 | 1–1 | 2–0 |
| AZ '67 | 1–1 | 2–1 | | 2–0 | 2–0 | 1–0 | 0–0 | 5–1 | 4–3 | 2–0 | 1–1 | 0–1 | 1–0 | 3–0 | 2–0 | 1–1 | 1–2 | 1–0 |
| Eindhoven | 2–3 | 2–1 | 1–3 | | 2–1 | 0–0 | 4–2 | 1–1 | 2–4 | 1–0 | 2–3 | 1–0 | 1–5 | 0–1 | 1–1 | 0–0 | 0–1 | 3–3 |
| Excelsior | 0–2 | 1–1 | 0–1 | 2–1 | | 1–4 | 0–5 | 3–0 | 0–1 | 2–0 | 0–2 | 0–0 | 0–2 | 1–2 | 0–2 | 1–5 | 4–2 | 0–1 |
| Feyenoord | 4–1 | 4–0 | 3–2 | 5–0 | 4–2 | | 4–2 | 8–0 | 4–1 | 2–0 | 4–0 | 3–3 | 1–0 | 3–0 | 1–1 | 3–1 | 3–0 | 3–1 |
| Go Ahead Eagles | 1–2 | 1–1 | 1–1 | 2–1 | 0–2 | 0–1 | | 0–0 | 1–0 | 2–3 | 0–0 | 0–1 | 1–1 | 1–1 | 2–2 | 0–0 | 1–0 | 2–2 |
| De Graafschap | 2–1 | 2–2 | 2–3 | 1–1 | 1–0 | 0–1 | 0–0 | | 2–2 | 5–1 | 0–0 | 2–1 | 2–4 | 0–0 | 2–2 | 5–3 | 1–1 | 4–1 |
| FC Den Haag | 1–3 | 5–1 | 3–0 | 6–0 | 1–0 | 1–8 | 5–1 | 6–1 | | 1–0 | 5–0 | 2–1 | 4–1 | 2–1 | 1–0 | 0–0 | 0–1 | 0–0 |
| MVV | 1–1 | 2–1 | 3–0 | 1–1 | 1–0 | 1–1 | 1–2 | 2–2 | 2–2 | | 2–0 | 2–3 | 1–6 | 0–2 | 1–0 | 1–1 | 2–1 | 3–1 |
| NAC | 0–0 | 1–3 | 0–2 | 2–0 | 0–0 | 2–2 | 3–1 | 1–0 | 2–0 | 2–1 | | 0–2 | 1–1 | 0–3 | 1–1 | 1–0 | 1–0 | 0–1 |
| N.E.C. | 1–2 | 1–1 | 1–0 | 0–0 | 1–1 | 1–1 | 3–3 | 0–0 | 2–1 | 1–0 | 0–0 | | 1–4 | 4–1 | 0–0 | 3–1 | 0–0 | 0–0 |
| PSV | 6–2 | 3–1 | 6–1 | 2–1 | 6–0 | 4–1 | 2–1 | 0–0 | 2–0 | 5–1 | 4–0 | 1–0 | | 0–0 | 3–0 | 6–1 | 3–0 | 3–0 |
| Roda JC | 0–0 | 2–1 | 1–0 | 1–2 | 0–1 | 4–2 | 1–1 | 3–3 | 1–0 | 2–0 | 3–0 | 2–3 | 0–1 | | 1–0 | 2–2 | 0–0 | 0–0 |
| Sparta | 1–1 | 2–1 | 1–1 | 0–1 | 0–1 | 0–2 | 1–1 | 0–1 | 2–2 | 2–1 | 2–1 | 2–1 | 1–0 | 1–1 | | 1–2 | 1–1 | 0–0 |
| Telstar | 1–1 | 0–3 | 1–1 | 0–2 | 2–0 | 1–2 | 1–1 | 2–1 | 2–2 | 4–0 | 2–0 | 1–1 | 0–0 | 0–0 | 2–2 | | 1–2 | 0–1 |
| FC Twente '65 | 3–0 | 3–1 | 2–2 | 3–1 | 4–0 | 2–0 | 4–1 | 8–0 | 2–0 | 5–0 | 3–0 | 0–0 | 2–0 | 3–2 | 1–1 | 1–0 | | 2–0 |
| FC Utrecht | 1–1 | 1–0 | 1–0 | 2–2 | 2–1 | 1–2 | 1–4 | 3–0 | 2–3 | 2–1 | 1–1 | 0–3 | 1–3 | 0–1 | 4–2 | 2–4 | 0–1 | |

Legend: Blue = home team win; Yellow = draw; Red = away team win.

== Season statistics ==
=== Top scorers ===
| Position | Player | Club | Goals |
|---|---|---|---|
| 1 | (Netherlands) Ruud Geels | Ajax | 29 |
| 2 | (Netherlands) Willy van der Kuijlen | PSV | 27 |
| 3 | (Netherlands) Nico Jansen | Feyenoord | 24 |
| 4 | (Netherlands) Jan Jeuring | FC Twente | 20 |
| 5 | (Netherlands) Martien Vreijsen | Feyenoord | 17 |
| 6 | (Netherlands) Gerdo Hazelhekke | De Graafschap | 16 |
| 6 | (Netherlands) Henk van Leeuwen | FC Den Haag | 16 |

== Attendances ==
| # | Club | Average | Change |
|---|---|---|---|
| 1 | Feyenoord | 29,683 | −20.2 |
| 2 | PSV | 19,029 | 0.0 |
| 3 | Ajax | 18,094 | −14.9 |
| 4 | Roda | 11,882 | −11.6 |
| 5 | NEC | 11,412 | +68.4 |
| 6 | AZ | 11,265 | −5.4 |
| 7 | Twente | 10,471 | +4.4 |
| 8 | NAC | 9,235 | +13.8 |
| 9 | Go Ahead Eagles | 8,776 | +4.3 |
| 10 | MVV | 8,529 | −2.5 |
| 11 | De Graafschap | 8,441 | −12.8 |
| 12 | Den Haag | 8,294 | −13.9 |
| 13 | Utrecht | 8,118 | −14.3 |
| 14 | Eindhoven | 7,206 | +39.3 |
| 15 | Sparta | 7,124 | −8.2 |
| 16 | Telstar | 6,100 | +0.7 |
| 17 | Amsterdam | 5,765 | −10.9 |
| 18 | Excelsior | 4,688 | −25.9 |

== See also ==
- 1975–76 Eerste Divisie
- 1975–76 KNVB Cup
