= 1975–76 KNVB Cup =

Tournament details
- Country: Netherlands
- Teams: 46

Final positions
- Champions: PSV
- Runners-up: Roda JC

The 1975-76 KNVB Cup was the 58th edition of the Dutch national football annual knockout tournament for the KNVB Cup. 46 teams contested, beginning on 6 September 1975 and ending at the final on 7 April 1976.

FC Den Haag unsuccessfully defended its 1975 title in the Round of 16 against PSV, 3–2. PSV successfully pursued its 3rd successive Cup title on 7 April 1976 at De Kuip, Rotterdam against Roda JC, 1–0 (after extra time). 32,760 attended. PSV became champions of the Netherlands by winning the Eredivisie 1975-76, thereby taking the double. They contested in the 1977 European Cup, so finalists Roda JC entered the Cup Winners' Cup tournament.

== Teams ==
- All 18 participants of the Eredivisie 1975-76, entering in the second round
- All 19 participants of the Eerste Divisie 1975-76
- 9 participants from lower (amateur) leagues

== First round ==
The matches of the first round were played on 6-7 September 1975.

Home team	Result	Away team
Rood Wit Amsterdam _{A}	2–2 (p)	FC Wageningen _{1}
SC Amersfoort _{1}	(p) 2-2	VV DOVO _{A}
SC Cambuur _{1}	2–2 (p)	FC VVV _{1}
Heracles _{1}	8–0	VV Helmond _{A}
VV Spijkenisse _{A}	1–2 (aet)	FC Dordrecht _{1}
SVV _{1}	2–0 (aet)	RBC _{A}
FC Volendam _{1}	1–3	VV Rheden _{A}

Home team	Result	Away team
HFC EDO _{A}	1–1 (p)	FC Vlaardingen _{1}
FC Emmen _{A}	2–1	FC Groningen _{1}
FC Den Bosch _{1}	(p) 0-0	Willem II _{1}
Fortuna SC _{1}	3–5 (aet)	SC Veendam _{1}
sc Heerenveen _{1}	0–2	PEC Zwolle _{1}
Helmond Sport _{1}	3–1	Vitesse Arnhem _{1}
VV Noordwijk _{A}	0–3	HFC Haarlem _{1}

_{1} Eerste Divisie; _{A} Amateur teams

== Second round ==
The matches of the second round were played on October 12, 1975. The Eredivisie clubs entered the tournament this round.

Home team	Result	Away team
Go Ahead Eagles _{E}	2–0	FC VVV
MVV _{E}	0–1	AZ'67 _{E}
NEC _{E}	1–3	Ajax _{E}
PSV _{E}	3–1	NAC _{E}
Roda JC _{E}	4–1	SC Amersfoort
Sparta _{E}	1–2	FC Amsterdam _{E}
SVV	3–1 (aet)	Heracles
FC Wageningen	3–0	Helmond Sport

Home team	Result	Away team
De Graafschap _{E}	3–1	VV Rheden
FC Eindhoven _{E}	2–0	Excelsior _{E}
FC Den Bosch	0–0 (p: 4–5)	HFC Haarlem
FC Den Haag _{E}	6–0	FC Emmen
FC Dordrecht	0–1	PEC Zwolle
FC Twente _{E}	9–2	FC Utrecht _{E}
FC Vlaardingen	1–4	Telstar _{E}
Feyenoord _{E}	5–0	SC Veendam

_{E} Eredivisie

== Round of 16 ==
The matches of the round of 16 were played on November 6 and 7, 1975.

Home team	Result	Away team
AZ'67	2–0	FC Twente
De Graafschap	4–0	HFC Haarlem
FC Eindhoven	4–1 (aet)	FC Wageningen
FC Amsterdam	1–3	Ajax
Go Ahead Eagles	1–1 (p: 5–6)	Feyenoord
PSV	3–2	FC Den Haag
Roda JC	2–1	Telstar
SVV	0–2	PEC Zwolle

== Quarter finals ==
The quarter finals were played between February 25 and 29, 1976.

Home team	Result	Away team
FC Eindhoven	2–0	AZ'67
PEC Zwolle	3–0	Ajax
PSV	8–1	De Graafschap
Roda JC	3–2 (aet)	Feyenoord

== Semi-finals ==
The semi-finals were played on March 10, 1976.

Home team	Result	Away team
PEC Zwolle	0–1	Roda JC
PSV	8–1	FC Eindhoven

== Final ==
7 April 1976

PSV	1–0 (a.e.t.)	Roda JC
Edström 102'

De Kuip, Rotterdam
Attendance: 32,760
Referee: Henk Pijper

PSV also became champions of the Netherlands by winning the Eredivisie 1975-76, thereby taking the double. They would participate in the European Cup next season, so finalists Roda JC could enter the Cup Winners' Cup tournament.
