= 1975–76 Eerste Divisie =

20th season of the second-tier football league in Netherlands

Eerste Divisie
- Season: 1975–76
- Champions: HFC Haarlem
- Promoted: HFC Haarlem; VVV-Venlo
- Goals: 905
- Average goals/game: 2.64

The Dutch Eerste Divisie in the 1975–76 season was contested by 19 teams. HFC Haarlem won the championship.

== New entrants ==
Relegated from the 1974–75 Eredivisie

- HFC Haarlem
- FC Wageningen

== League standings ==
Pos	Team	Pld	W	D	L	GF	GA	GD	Pts	Promotion or qualification
1	HFC Haarlem	36	23	9	4	78	36	+42	55	Promoted to Eredivisie.
2	VVV-Venlo	36	21	7	8	61	33	+28	49	Qualified for Promotion play-off as Period Champions.
3	FC Wageningen	36	17	10	9	52	27	+25	44	Qualified for Promotion play-off as Period Champions.
4	FC Groningen	36	15	12	9	52	29	+23	42	
5	Vitesse Arnhem	36	13	16	7	58	35	+23	42	Qualified for Promotion play-off as Period Champions.
6	PEC Zwolle	36	14	14	8	51	35	+16	42	
7	Fortuna SC	36	17	8	11	48	45	+3	42	Qualified for Promotion play-off as Period Champions.
8	SC Veendam	36	15	10	11	46	39	+7	40	
9	Willem II	36	13	10	13	53	65	−12	36	
10	FC Den Bosch	36	12	10	14	44	47	−3	34	
11	SC Cambuur	36	12	10	14	50	56	−6	34	
12	FC Dordrecht	36	12	9	15	46	53	−7	33	
13	sc Heerenveen	36	12	8	16	39	49	−10	32	
14	FC Volendam	36	10	10	16	45	57	−12	30	
15	SC Heracles	36	12	5	19	38	54	−16	29	
16	Helmond Sport	36	9	11	16	34	51	−17	29	
17	FC Vlaardingen	36	7	11	18	40	52	−12	25	
18	SC Amersfoort	36	8	9	19	39	66	−27	25	
19	SVV	36	6	9	21	31	76	−45	21	

Source: rsssf.com

== Promotion competition ==
In the promotion competition, four period winners (the best teams during each of the four quarters of the regular competition) played for promotion to the Eredivisie.

Pos	Team	Pld	W	D	L	GF	GA	GD	Pts	Promotion
1	VVV-Venlo	6	4	1	1	8	4	+4	9	Promoted to Eredivisie.
2	Fortuna SC	6	3	1	2	14	10	+4	7	
3	Vitesse Arnhem	6	2	2	2	8	9	−1	6	
4	FC Wageningen	6	0	2	4	7	14	−7	2	

Source: rsssf.com

== Attendances ==
#	Club	Average
1	VVV	9,506
2	Groningen	5,594
3	Haarlem	5,256
4	Fortuna	4,306
5	Cambuur	4,172
6	Wageningen	4,083
7	Heerenveen	4,078
8	Veendam	3,961
9	Zwolle	3,844
10	Vitesse	3,750
11	Willem II	3,006
12	Volendam	2,594
13	Dordrecht	2,592
14	Vlaardingen	2,589
15	Helmond	2,453
16	Den Bosch	2,250
17	Heracles	2,172
18	SVV	2,017
19	Amersfoort	1,401

== See also ==
- 1975–76 Eredivisie
- 1975–76 KNVB Cup
