= Ken Tiler =

English footballer

Personal information
- Full name: Kenneth David Tiler
- Date of birth: 23 May 1950 (age 76)
- Place of birth: Sheffield, England
- Height: 5 ft 11 in (1.80 m)
- Position: Right back

Senior career*
Years	Team	Apps	(Gls)
1970–1975	Chesterfield	140	(1)
1975–1979	Brighton & Hove Albion	130	(0)
1979–1981	Rotherham United	46	(1)
1981–1983	Boston United	72	(1)
1983–1984	Gainsborough Trinity		
Total		388	(3)
- * Club domestic league appearances and goals

Kenneth David Tiler (born 23 May 1950) is an English former professional footballer who played in the Football League, as a right back.
