= Steve Mackreth =

Welsh footballer

Personal information
- Full name: Stephen Francis Mackreth
- Date of birth: 1 July 1950 (age 76)
- Place of birth: Rossett, Wrexham, Wales
- Position: Full-back

Youth career
- Wrexham

Senior career*
Years	Team	Apps	(Gls)
1967–1969	Wrexham	2	(0)
- Oswestry Town
- * Club domestic league appearances and goals

Stephen Francis Mackreth (born 1 July 1950) is a Welsh former professional footballer who played as a full-back. He made appearances in the English Football League with Wrexham.
