= Tom Vansittart =

English footballer

Personal information
- Full name: Thomas Vansittart
- Date of birth: 23 January 1950 (age 76)
- Place of birth: Merton, Greater London
- Position: Defender

Youth career
- ?–1967: Crystal Palace

Senior career*
| Years | Team | Apps | (Gls) |
| 1967–1970 | Crystal Palace | 11 | (2) |
| 1970–1975 | Wrexham | 88 | (1) |
| 1975–? | Wimbledon | ? | (?) |
- * Club domestic league appearances and goals

Thomas Vansittart (born 23 January 1950) is an English, retired professional footballer who played in the Football League as a defender for Crystal Palace and Wrexham. He also played non-league football for Wimbledon.

== Playing career ==
Vansittart was born in Merton, then within Surrey but subsequently part of Greater London, and began his youth career at Crystal Palace, signing professional terms in April 1967. He made his senior debut on 23 March 1968, in a home 1–1 draw against Carlisle United and went on to make seven League appearances that season, scoring twice in a 6–0 home win over Norwich City on 16 April. Vansittart did not make an appearance in the 1968–69 season when Palace gained promotion to the top tier for the first time, but played four times in the following season, before moving on to Wrexham in February 1970.

At Wrexham, Vansittart made 88 appearances, scoring once, before moving into non-league football with Wimbledon in 1975.
