= 1950–51 Football League =

52nd season of the Football League

The Football League
- Season: 1950–51
- Champions: Tottenham Hotspur
- Relegated: New Brighton
- New clubs in League: Colchester United, Gillingham, Scunthorpe & Lindsey United, Shrewsbury Town

The 1950–51 season was the 52nd completed season of The Football League.

== Final league tables ==
The tables below are reproduced here in the exact form that they can be found at The Rec.Sport.Soccer Statistics Foundation website and in Rothmans Book of Football League Records 1888–89 to 1978–79, with home and away statistics separated.

Beginning with the season 1894–95, clubs finishing level on points were separated according to goal average (goals scored divided by goals conceded), or more properly put, goal ratio. In case one or more teams had the same goal difference, this system favoured those teams who had scored fewer goals. The goal average system was eventually scrapped beginning with the 1976–77 season.

From the 1922–23 season, the bottom two teams of both Third Division North and Third Division South were required to apply for re-election.

== First Division ==
First Division
- Season: 1950–51
- Champions: Tottenham Hotspur; 1st English title
- Relegated: Sheffield Wednesday; Everton
- Matches: 462
- Goals: 1,413 (3.06 per match)
- Top goalscorer: Stan Mortensen (30 goals)

Newly promoted Tottenham Hotspur won the First Division title for the first time in their history, and achieved the rare distinction of lifting the First Division title one season after promotion. They finished four points ahead of their nearest rivals Manchester United.

Sheffield Wednesday and Everton were relegated to the Second Division, bracketed together at the bottom of the First Division on 32 points. Chelsea survived on goal average.

Pos	Team	Pld	W	D	L	GF	GA	GAv	Pts	Relegation
1	Tottenham Hotspur (C)	42	25	10	7	82	44	1.864	60	
2	Manchester United	42	24	8	10	74	40	1.850	56	
3	Blackpool	42	20	10	12	79	53	1.491	50	
4	Newcastle United	42	18	13	11	62	53	1.170	49	
5	Arsenal	42	19	9	14	73	56	1.304	47	
6	Middlesbrough	42	18	11	13	76	65	1.169	47	
7	Portsmouth	42	16	15	11	71	68	1.044	47	
8	Bolton Wanderers	42	19	7	16	64	61	1.049	45	
9	Liverpool	42	16	11	15	53	59	0.898	43	
10	Burnley	42	14	14	14	48	43	1.116	42	
11	Derby County	42	16	8	18	81	75	1.080	40	
12	Sunderland	42	12	16	14	63	73	0.863	40	
13	Stoke City	42	13	14	15	50	59	0.847	40	
14	Wolverhampton Wanderers	42	15	8	19	74	61	1.213	38	
15	Aston Villa	42	12	13	17	66	68	0.971	37	
16	West Bromwich Albion	42	13	11	18	53	61	0.869	37	
17	Charlton Athletic	42	14	9	19	63	80	0.788	37	
18	Fulham	42	13	11	18	52	68	0.765	37	
19	Huddersfield Town	42	15	6	21	64	92	0.696	36	
20	Chelsea	42	12	8	22	53	65	0.815	32	
21	Sheffield Wednesday (R)	42	12	8	22	64	83	0.771	32	Relegation to the Second Division
22	Everton (R)	42	12	8	22	48	86	0.558	32	Relegation to the Second Division

Source: World Football
Rules for classification: 1) Points; 2) Goal average; 3) Goals scored
(C) Champions; (R) Relegated

=== Results ===
Home \ Away	ARS	AST	BLP	BOL	BUR	CHA	CHE	DER	EVE	FUL	HUD	LIV	MUN	MID	NEW	POR	SHW	STK	SUN	TOT	WBA	WOL
Arsenal		2–1	4–4	1–1	0–1	2–5	0–0	3–1	2–1	5–1	6–2	1–2	3–0	3–1	0–0	0–1	3–0	0–3	5–1	2–2	3–0	2–1
Aston Villa	1–1		0–3	0–1	3–2	0–0	4–2	1–1	3–3	3–0	0–1	1–1	1–3	0–1	3–0	3–3	2–1	6–2	3–1	2–3	2–0	1–0
Blackpool	0–1	1–1		2–0	1–2	0–0	3–2	3–1	4–0	4–0	3–1	3–0	1–1	2–1	2–2	3–0	3–2	3–0	2–2	0–1	2–1	1–1
Bolton Wanderers	3–0	1–0	1–2		1–1	3–0	1–0	3–0	2–0	0–1	4–0	2–1	1–0	0–2	0–2	4–0	0–1	1–1	1–2	1–4	0–2	2–1
Burnley	0–1	2–0	0–0	2–0		5–1	2–1	1–0	1–1	0–2	0–1	1–1	1–2	3–1	1–1	1–1	1–0	1–1	1–1	2–0	0–1	2–0
Charlton Athletic	1–3	2–2	2–3	4–3	0–0		1–2	1–2	2–1	0–0	3–2	1–0	1–2	3–0	1–3	0–1	2–1	2–0	3–0	1–1	2–3	3–2
Chelsea	0–1	1–1	0–2	4–0	0–2	2–3		1–2	2–1	2–0	1–2	1–0	1–0	1–1	3–1	1–4	4–0	1–1	3–0	0–2	1–1	2–1
Derby County	4–2	4–2	4–1	2–2	1–1	5–0	1–0		0–1	3–2	3–0	1–2	2–4	6–0	1–2	2–3	4–1	1–1	6–5	1–1	1–1	1–2
Everton	1–1	1–2	0–2	1–1	1–0	0–0	3–0	1–2		1–0	3–2	1–3	1–4	3–2	3–1	1–5	0–0	0–3	3–1	1–2	0–3	1–1
Fulham	3–2	2–1	2–2	0–1	4–1	1–3	1–2	3–5	1–5		1–1	2–1	2–2	2–0	1–1	1–4	4–2	2–0	1–1	0–1	0–1	2–1
Huddersfield Town	2–2	4–2	2–1	0–4	3–1	1–1	2–1	2–0	1–2	1–2		2–2	2–3	2–3	0–0	2–1	3–4	3–1	3–4	3–2	1–2	1–2
Liverpool	1–3	0–0	1–0	3–3	1–0	1–0	1–0	1–0	0–2	2–0	1–4		2–1	0–0	2–4	2–1	2–1	0–0	4–0	2–1	1–1	1–4
Manchester United	3–1	0–0	1–0	2–3	1–1	3–0	4–1	2–0	3–0	1–0	6–0	1–0		1–0	1–2	0–0	3–1	0–0	3–5	2–1	3–0	2–1
Middlesbrough	2–1	2–1	4–3	1–1	3–3	7–3	3–0	1–1	4–0	1–1	8–0	1–1	1–2		2–1	3–1	2–1	1–0	1–1	1–1	2–1	1–2
Newcastle United	2–1	0–1	4–2	0–1	2–1	3–2	3–1	3–1	1–1	1–2	6–0	1–1	0–2	1–0		0–0	2–0	3–1	2–2	0–1	1–1	1–1
Portsmouth	1–1	3–3	2–0	2–1	2–1	3–3	1–3	2–2	6–3	1–0	1–0	1–3	0–0	1–1	0–0		4–1	5–1	0–0	1–1	2–2	1–4
Sheffield Wednesday	0–2	3–2	3–1	3–4	0–1	1–2	2–2	4–3	6–0	2–2	3–2	4–1	0–4	0–1	0–0	2–1		1–1	3–0	1–1	3–0	2–2
Stoke City	1–0	1–0	1–0	2–1	0–0	2–0	2–1	4–1	2–0	1–1	0–1	2–3	2–0	2–0	1–2	1–2	1–1		2–4	0–0	1–1	0–1
Sunderland	0–2	3–3	0–2	1–2	1–1	4–2	1–1	1–0	4–0	0–1	0–0	2–1	2–1	2–1	2–1	0–0	5–1	1–1		0–0	1–1	0–0
Tottenham Hotspur	1–0	3–2	1–4	4–2	1–0	1–0	2–1	2–1	3–0	2–1	0–2	3–1	1–0	3–3	7–0	5–1	1–0	6–1	1–1		5–0	2–1
West Bromwich Albion	2–0	2–0	1–3	0–1	2–1	3–0	1–1	1–2	0–1	0–0	0–2	1–1	0–1	2–3	1–2	5–0	1–3	1–1	3–1	1–2		3–2
Wolverhampton Wanderers	0–1	2–3	1–1	7–1	0–1	2–3	2–1	2–3	4–0	1–1	3–1	2–0	0–0	3–4	0–1	2–3	4–0	2–3	2–1	2–1	3–1	

Updated to match(es) played on unknown. Source: Ian Laschke: Rothmans Book of Football League Records 1888–89 to 1978–79. Macdonald and Jane’s, London & Sydney, 1980.
Legend: Blue = home team win; Yellow = draw; Red = away team win.

=== Maps ===
Locations of the Football League First Division London teams 1950–1951
Locations of the Football League First Division 1950–1951 teams

== Second Division ==
Second Division
- Season: 1950–51
- Champions: Preston North End
- Promoted: Preston North End; Manchester City
- Relegated: Chesterfield; Grimsby Town
- Matches: 462
- Goals: 1,469 (3.18 per match)
- Top goalscorer: Cec McCormack (33 goals)

Pos	Team	Pld	W	D	L	GF	GA	GAv	Pts	Qualification or relegation
1	Preston North End (C, P)	42	26	5	11	91	49	1.857	57	Promotion to the First Division
2	Manchester City (P)	42	19	14	9	89	61	1.459	52	Promotion to the First Division
3	Cardiff City	42	17	16	9	53	45	1.178	50	
4	Birmingham City	42	20	9	13	64	53	1.208	49	
5	Leeds United	42	20	8	14	63	55	1.145	48	
6	Blackburn Rovers	42	19	8	15	65	66	0.985	46	
7	Coventry City	42	19	7	16	75	59	1.271	45	
8	Sheffield United	42	16	12	14	72	62	1.161	44	
9	Brentford	42	18	8	16	75	74	1.014	44	
10	Hull City	42	16	11	15	74	70	1.057	43	
11	Doncaster Rovers	42	15	13	14	64	68	0.941	43	
12	Southampton	42	15	13	14	66	73	0.904	43	
13	West Ham United	42	16	10	16	68	69	0.986	42	
14	Leicester City	42	15	11	16	68	58	1.172	41	
15	Barnsley	42	15	10	17	74	68	1.088	40	
16	Queens Park Rangers	42	15	10	17	71	82	0.866	40	
17	Notts County	42	13	13	16	61	60	1.017	39	
18	Swansea Town	42	16	4	22	54	77	0.701	36	
19	Luton Town	42	9	14	19	57	70	0.814	32	
20	Bury	42	12	8	22	60	86	0.698	32	
21	Chesterfield (R)	42	9	12	21	44	69	0.638	30	Relegation to the Third Division North
22	Grimsby Town (R)	42	8	12	22	61	95	0.642	28	Relegation to the Third Division North

Rules for classification: 1) Points; 2) Goal average; 3) Goals scored
(C) Champions; (P) Promoted; (R) Relegated

=== Results ===
Home \ Away	BAR	BIR	BLB	BRE	BRY	CAR	CHF	COV	DON	GRI	HUL	LEE	LEI	LUT	MCI	NTC	PNE	QPR	SHU	SOU	SWA	WHU
Barnsley		0–2	3–0	2–3	2–3	0–0	0–0	3–0	0–1	3–1	4–2	1–2	0–0	6–1	1–1	2–0	4–1	7–0	1–1	1–2	1–0	1–2
Birmingham	2–0		3–2	1–1	3–3	0–0	2–1	1–1	0–2	1–1	2–1	0–1	2–0	3–0	1–0	1–4	1–0	1–1	3–0	2–1	5–0	3–1
Blackburn Rovers	3–4	2–3		3–2	2–4	2–0	1–1	1–0	4–2	2–0	2–2	2–1	1–0	1–0	4–1	0–0	2–1	2–1	0–2	1–0	3–0	1–3
Brentford	0–2	2–1	3–2		4–0	4–0	4–0	0–4	1–1	5–1	2–1	1–2	0–0	1–0	2–0	1–3	2–4	2–1	3–1	4–0	2–1	1–1
Bury	0–3	4–1	1–3	2–1		1–2	2–2	1–0	3–1	2–3	0–2	0–1	2–3	4–1	2–0	0–0	3–1	0–1	1–1	1–0	1–1	3–0
Cardiff City	1–1	2–1	1–0	1–1	2–2		1–0	2–1	0–0	5–2	2–1	1–0	2–2	2–1	1–1	2–0	0–2	4–2	2–0	2–2	1–0	2–1
Chesterfield	1–2	1–1	4–1	2–2	3–0	0–3		1–1	1–4	2–2	0–0	1–0	1–0	1–1	1–2	0–0	2–0	3–1	0–2	2–3	3–1	1–2
Coventry City	3–3	3–1	6–1	3–3	5–2	2–1	1–0		3–1	1–0	4–1	1–0	2–1	4–1	0–2	1–2	1–0	3–0	2–3	2–2	3–1	1–0
Doncaster Rovers	3–2	0–1	0–1	0–3	1–1	0–0	1–2	2–1		3–1	2–4	4–4	2–2	5–2	4–3	3–2	2–0	0–2	1–1	0–0	1–0	3–0
Grimsby Town	3–1	1–1	1–1	7–2	2–1	0–0	1–2	1–2	1–0		1–1	2–2	0–2	0–2	4–4	1–4	0–4	2–2	2–2	4–2	4–2	0–1
Hull City	3–3	3–2	2–2	3–0	4–0	2–0	2–1	0–2	1–2	2–1		2–0	1–3	5–3	3–3	1–0	0–0	5–1	1–1	4–1	2–1	1–2
Leeds United	2–2	3–0	0–1	1–0	1–1	2–0	2–0	1–0	3–1	1–0	3–0		2–1	2–1	1–1	0–1	0–3	2–2	1–0	5–3	2–0	2–0
Leicester City	1–2	1–3	2–0	1–2	4–0	1–1	1–0	3–0	2–0	0–0	4–0	1–5		3–1	1–2	1–1	2–3	6–2	2–2	3–1	2–3	1–0
Luton Town	1–1	1–1	1–1	2–0	4–2	1–1	3–0	1–1	3–1	4–0	1–2	2–3	0–2		2–2	1–1	1–2	2–0	0–0	0–1	3–1	1–1
Manchester City	6–0	3–1	1–0	4–0	5–1	2–1	5–1	1–0	3–3	2–2	0–0	4–1	1–1	1–1		0–0	0–3	5–2	5–3	2–3	1–2	2–0
Notts County	2–1	0–1	1–1	2–3	4–2	1–2	1–0	0–2	1–2	3–2	2–2	0–0	2–3	2–2	0–0		1–3	3–3	3–0	2–2	3–2	4–1
Preston North End	7–0	1–0	3–0	4–2	2–0	1–1	4–1	1–1	6–1	2–0	1–0	2–0	3–2	1–0	2–4	3–1		1–0	1–1	3–2	5–1	0–1
Queens Park Rangers	2–1	2–0	3–1	1–1	3–2	3–2	1–1	3–1	1–2	7–1	3–1	3–0	3–0	1–1	1–2	1–0	1–4		2–1	2–0	1–1	3–3
Sheffield United	0–2	3–2	0–3	5–1	3–0	1–2	4–1	2–0	0–0	4–2	3–1	2–2	2–1	2–1	0–0	1–2	2–3	2–0		1–2	6–1	1–1
Southampton	1–0	0–2	1–1	2–1	1–0	1–1	1–1	5–4	1–1	5–1	2–3	2–0	2–2	1–1	2–1	1–0	3–3	2–2	1–0		2–1	2–2
Swansea Town	1–0	0–1	1–2	2–1	2–0	1–0	2–0	2–1	2–2	1–3	1–0	4–2	2–1	0–2	2–3	2–1	2–1	1–0	1–2	2–1		3–2
West Ham United	4–2	1–2	2–3	1–2	2–3	0–0	2–0	3–2	0–0	2–1	3–3	3–1	0–0	2–1	2–4	4–2	2–0	4–1	3–5	3–0	1–1	

Updated to match(es) played on unknown. Source: Ian Laschke: Rothmans Book of Football League Records 1888–89 to 1978–79. Macdonald and Jane’s, London & Sydney, 1980.
Legend: Blue = home team win; Yellow = draw; Red = away team win.

=== Maps ===
Locations of the Football League Second Division London teams 1950–1951
Locations of the Football League Second Division 1950–1951 teams

== Third Division North ==
Football League Third Division North
- Season: 1950–51
- Champions: Rotherham United (1st title)
- Failed re-election: New Brighton
- New clubs in League: Scunthorpe & Lindsey United, Shrewsbury Town
- Matches: 552
- Goals: 1,608 (2.91 per match)
- Top goalscorer: Jack Shaw (Rotherham United), 37

Pos	Team	Pld	W	D	L	GF	GA	GAv	Pts	Promotion or relegation
1	Rotherham United (C, P)	46	31	9	6	103	41	2.512	71	Promotion to the Second Division
2	Mansfield Town	46	26	12	8	78	48	1.625	64	
3	Carlisle United	46	25	12	9	79	50	1.580	62	
4	Tranmere Rovers	46	24	11	11	83	62	1.339	59	
5	Lincoln City	46	25	8	13	89	58	1.534	58	
6	Bradford (Park Avenue)	46	23	8	15	90	72	1.250	54	
7	Bradford City	46	21	10	15	90	63	1.429	52	
8	Gateshead	46	21	8	17	84	62	1.355	50	
9	Crewe Alexandra	46	19	10	17	61	60	1.017	48	
10	Stockport County	46	20	8	18	63	63	1.000	48	
11	Rochdale	46	17	11	18	69	62	1.113	45	
12	Scunthorpe & Lindsey United	46	13	18	15	58	57	1.018	44	
13	Chester	46	17	9	20	62	64	0.969	43	
14	Wrexham	46	15	12	19	55	71	0.775	42	
15	Oldham Athletic	46	16	8	22	73	73	1.000	40	
16	Hartlepools United	46	16	7	23	64	66	0.970	39	
17	York City	46	12	15	19	66	77	0.857	39	
18	Darlington	46	13	13	20	59	77	0.766	39	
19	Barrow	46	16	6	24	51	76	0.671	38	
20	Shrewsbury Town	46	15	7	24	43	74	0.581	37	Transferred to the Third Division South
21	Southport	46	13	10	23	56	72	0.778	36	
22	Halifax Town	46	11	12	23	50	69	0.725	34	
23	Accrington Stanley	46	11	10	25	42	101	0.416	32	Re-elected
24	New Brighton (R)	46	11	8	27	40	90	0.444	30	Failed re-election and demoted

Source: rsssf.com
(C) Champions; (P) Promoted; (R) Relegated

=== Results ===
Home \ Away	ACC	BRW	BRA	BPA	CRL	CHE	CRE	DAR	GAT	HAL	HAR	LIN	MAN	NWB	OLD	ROC	ROT	SCU	SHR	SOU	STP	TRA	WRE	YOR
Accrington Stanley		1–0	0–2	3–3	0–4	1–2	1–0	1–0	2–2	1–0	2–0	3–1	0–2	1–1	1–2	1–2	0–2	0–0	2–0	3–1	2–3	0–2	1–0	2–0
Barrow	4–0		1–3	2–3	1–2	2–0	0–1	0–3	1–1	2–0	3–0	3–1	2–3	1–1	2–1	4–3	0–2	1–0	0–0	3–1	1–0	1–2	2–0	2–0
Bradford City	7–0	5–1		4–1	2–4	0–1	1–1	0–3	2–2	2–0	3–1	0–0	2–3	3–0	1–0	2–1	3–4	2–0	1–0	3–0	0–1	2–2	5–3	5–2
Bradford Park Avenue	3–0	5–0	3–1		0–2	2–0	1–1	2–1	2–0	2–1	1–1	2–1	1–0	2–1	3–1	0–1	0–4	2–2	2–4	2–0	3–0	4–1	0–1	4–0
Carlisle United	3–1	1–1	2–1	1–0		2–1	2–1	2–1	3–0	1–0	1–0	2–0	2–0	1–0	1–0	4–0	0–0	3–1	2–2	3–1	2–2	3–1	0–2	3–2
Chester	2–2	1–2	2–2	2–0	1–1		1–1	3–1	2–2	2–1	2–1	2–1	0–1	3–1	3–1	1–3	1–2	4–1	3–1	0–2	3–0	1–3	0–0	3–1
Crewe Alexandra	3–0	2–0	1–1	2–4	1–1	3–0		5–0	0–1	0–0	3–1	0–4	2–0	2–0	2–1	3–1	1–2	2–0	1–2	1–0	0–2	1–1	1–1	2–4
Darlington	3–0	1–1	2–1	1–4	1–0	0–0	2–0		4–2	2–0	0–1	1–1	1–2	5–3	0–0	0–2	2–2	3–2	2–1	1–1	2–1	1–1	1–1	0–3
Gateshead	7–0	1–0	2–0	5–0	4–3	2–1	4–0	5–2		5–0	0–1	1–2	1–3	4–0	3–2	4–1	0–3	1–0	3–0	1–3	2–0	2–0	0–0	3–0
Halifax Town	2–2	0–0	1–2	2–2	1–0	3–1	1–0	2–2	1–0		1–0	4–1	0–1	0–2	3–0	1–1	1–2	3–3	3–1	4–0	1–0	0–1	1–0	1–3
Hartlepool	1–0	6–1	1–1	3–1	3–3	1–2	0–2	6–1	3–0	5–2		2–2	1–1	0–1	0–1	0–0	3–1	4–2	1–0	3–2	2–0	2–1	4–1	4–1
Lincoln City	9–1	3–0	1–4	1–3	1–1	2–1	4–1	3–0	2–1	3–1	1–0		3–0	3–0	2–0	4–2	0–2	2–1	5–0	1–2	6–0	2–1	2–1	2–1
Mansfield Town	5–0	4–0	1–1	3–2	2–1	2–1	4–1	2–1	2–1	3–1	1–0	1–1		4–0	3–1	1–0	1–1	1–1	4–0	2–2	2–1	2–1	1–1	3–1
New Brighton	1–1	1–2	0–6	3–3	0–1	1–0	0–2	2–2	0–1	1–0	1–0	0–1	0–1		2–0	1–5	2–4	1–2	0–0	1–0	1–0	1–1	3–0	0–0
Oldham Athletic	2–1	0–1	2–2	2–3	1–1	1–0	0–2	2–0	2–3	2–0	5–1	0–0	2–0	3–1		2–0	4–5	3–4	2–1	4–0	1–3	3–4	2–2	2–2
Rochdale	3–1	1–0	4–0	1–2	4–1	2–3	1–1	0–0	2–0	0–0	3–1	3–0	0–0	1–0	0–1		0–2	2–0	5–0	1–1	1–1	2–3	2–0	0–1
Rotherham United	6–2	3–0	1–0	2–1	3–0	0–0	2–3	0–1	1–2	2–0	2–1	3–0	3–0	5–0	3–1	3–0		4–1	2–0	1–1	0–0	1–2	5–0	3–1
Scunthorpe & Lindsey United	3–0	1–0	0–0	1–1	1–1	2–0	1–1	2–0	2–1	2–2	0–0	1–1	0–0	6–0	1–0	3–0	0–0		0–0	0–0	3–0	1–1	2–0	0–1
Shrewsbury Town	0–1	1–0	2–0	1–0	0–3	1–0	0–1	2–2	1–0	2–0	1–0	1–2	1–1	4–2	2–2	0–2	1–2	3–1		1–5	0–3	1–2	2–1	1–0
Southport	3–0	4–1	0–1	2–4	1–0	0–1	2–0	1–0	1–0	1–1	3–0	0–2	0–1	0–1	1–4	1–1	0–1	2–2	1–2		2–0	0–1	3–1	1–1
Stockport County	0–0	4–1	3–1	2–1	1–2	0–3	3–0	1–0	5–2	2–1	2–0	2–0	3–1	4–0	1–4	2–2	1–3	1–2	2–0	3–2		0–0	2–1	1–0
Tranmere	1–1	3–0	3–1	2–2	2–2	3–1	3–0	3–2	2–2	3–2	1–0	0–1	2–1	4–3	1–0	2–1	2–1	1–0	0–1	4–0	1–1		1–2	7–2
Wrexham	1–1	1–0	0–3	3–1	2–1	2–0	0–2	3–1	0–0	2–2	1–0	2–3	2–2	0–1	0–2	3–1	0–0	3–1	1–0	3–3	2–0	2–1		4–3
York City	3–0	0–2	1–2	1–3	1–1	2–2	1–2	1–1	1–1	0–0	3–0	2–2	1–1	2–0	2–2	2–2	3–3	0–0	2–0	2–0	0–0	4–0	3–0	

Updated to match(es) played on unknown. Source: Ian Laschke: Rothmans Book of Football League Records 1888–89 to 1978–79. Macdonald and Jane’s, London & Sydney, 1980.
Legend: Blue = home team win; Yellow = draw; Red = away team win.

=== Maps ===
Locations of the Football League Third Division North teams 1950–1951

== Third Division South ==
Football League Third Division South
- Season: 1950–51
- Champions: Nottingham Forest (1st title)
- Failed re-election: none
- New clubs in League: Colchester United, Gillingham
- Matches: 552
- Goals: 1,623 (2.94 per match)
- Top goalscorer: Wally Ardron (Nottingham Forest), 36

Pos	Team	Pld	W	D	L	GF	GA	GAv	Pts	Promotion or qualification
1	Nottingham Forest (C, P)	46	30	10	6	110	40	2.750	70	Promotion to the Second Division
2	Norwich City	46	25	14	7	82	45	1.822	64	
3	Reading	46	21	15	10	88	53	1.660	57	
4	Plymouth Argyle	46	24	9	13	85	55	1.545	57	
5	Millwall	46	23	10	13	80	57	1.404	56	
6	Bristol Rovers	46	20	15	11	64	42	1.524	55	
7	Southend United	46	21	10	15	92	69	1.333	52	
8	Ipswich Town	46	23	6	17	69	58	1.190	52	
9	Bournemouth & Boscombe Athletic	46	22	7	17	65	57	1.140	51	
10	Bristol City	46	20	11	15	64	59	1.085	51	
11	Newport County	46	19	9	18	77	70	1.100	47	
12	Port Vale	46	16	13	17	60	65	0.923	45	
13	Brighton & Hove Albion	46	13	17	16	71	79	0.899	43	
14	Exeter City	46	18	6	22	62	85	0.729	42	
15	Walsall	46	15	10	21	52	62	0.839	40	
16	Colchester United	46	14	12	20	63	76	0.829	40	
17	Swindon Town	46	18	4	24	55	67	0.821	40	
18	Aldershot	46	15	10	21	56	88	0.636	40	
19	Leyton Orient	46	15	8	23	53	75	0.707	38	
20	Torquay United	46	14	9	23	64	81	0.790	37	
21	Northampton Town	46	10	16	20	55	67	0.821	36	
22	Gillingham	46	13	9	24	69	101	0.683	35	
23	Watford	46	9	11	26	54	88	0.614	29	Re-elected
24	Crystal Palace	46	8	11	27	33	84	0.393	27	Re-elected

(C) Champions; (P) Promoted

=== Results ===
Home \ Away	ALD	B&BA	B&HA	BRI	BRR	COL	CRY	EXE	GIL	IPS	LEY	MIL	NPC	NOR	NWC	NOT	PLY	PTV	REA	STD	SWI	TOR	WAL	WAT
Aldershot		0–1	0–0	0–0	1–1	2–0	3–0	4–2	2–4	0–1	3–1	2–1	3–1	3–0	1–1	1–0	2–2	2–0	1–1	2–2	0–1	1–0	3–0	1–1
Bournemouth & Boscombe Athletic	4–0		2–2	1–0	2–0	2–0	5–0	1–1	3–1	2–1	5–0	1–0	2–0	1–0	0–0	3–2	0–2	3–1	1–0	3–1	2–1	0–0	3–1	3–3
Brighton & Hove Albion	1–2	2–1		1–1	2–2	3–1	1–0	4–1	2–2	4–0	3–0	2–3	9–1	5–1	1–1	1–2	0–6	2–2	1–1	2–1	1–0	2–2	1–0	1–1
Bristol City	1–1	2–0	2–0		1–0	0–2	2–0	3–1	2–0	2–1	4–1	2–1	2–1	1–0	2–2	0–3	1–0	3–1	3–3	0–3	2–0	0–2	3–3	3–0
Bristol Rovers	3–0	2–0	3–2	2–1		1–1	1–1	3–1	3–0	1–1	2–1	1–0	1–0	1–1	3–3	0–2	3–1	2–0	4–0	4–1	1–0	1–1	1–1	3–0
Colchester United	1–0	4–1	4–1	1–1	0–0		1–0	0–1	4–2	2–3	1–0	3–0	1–1	2–1	2–3	0–2	3–0	1–1	1–1	1–3	4–1	3–1	0–1	4–1
Crystal Palace	0–2	0–1	0–2	1–0	1–0	1–3		0–1	4–3	1–3	1–1	1–1	1–1	0–0	0–5	1–6	0–1	0–2	0–3	0–2	2–0	2–1	1–0	1–1
Exeter City	3–0	2–1	4–2	1–0	0–2	5–0	1–2		1–2	2–0	0–0	0–1	2–2	1–0	1–2	0–5	3–2	0–3	1–3	1–0	1–0	0–0	1–0	3–3
Gillingham	3–0	2–2	1–1	1–2	1–0	0–0	0–0	9–4		0–1	1–0	4–3	0–1	3–1	2–2	1–4	1–2	1–1	0–3	0–0	2–1	2–0	4–1	3–1
Ipswich Town	5–2	1–0	3–0	2–0	2–3	3–0	1–1	1–0	5–1		2–2	2–1	2–1	1–1	0–1	1–3	2–0	2–2	0–2	1–0	4–1	3–1	3–1	2–1
Leyton Orient	1–0	2–0	2–1	0–2	1–0	1–1	2–0	1–3	4–0	2–0		0–2	0–3	1–0	3–1	0–4	1–2	2–3	2–0	1–1	2–1	5–1	2–1	1–2
Millwall	1–0	3–0	1–1	5–3	1–0	2–0	1–0	5–0	4–3	4–0	3–1		2–4	2–1	1–1	1–1	1–1	2–2	1–3	1–1	1–0	4–1	2–0	4–0
Newport County	7–0	1–0	3–0	0–1	2–1	2–0	2–4	0–3	1–0	1–2	0–0	2–3		2–2	1–1	0–2	2–0	2–1	5–0	6–1	2–1	2–1	3–0	2–2
Northampton Town	1–0	0–1	0–0	2–2	1–1	2–1	2–0	4–1	4–1	2–1	3–3	1–2	1–4		1–2	2–2	1–3	1–1	1–1	1–1	1–2	1–0	1–1	6–0
Norwich City	2–2	3–0	1–1	0–0	2–0	1–1	3–1	3–0	2–0	1–3	3–1	2–1	2–1	0–0		2–0	1–0	2–0	2–1	3–0	2–0	1–1	1–0	3–1
Nottingham Forest	7–0	1–0	4–0	0–0	2–1	0–0	1–0	2–2	9–2	0–0	0–1	2–0	2–1	2–2	4–2		4–1	2–1	1–1	3–0	2–1	3–1	4–0	2–1
Plymouth Argyle	5–1	3–1	3–3	2–0	0–0	7–1	4–0	0–1	2–0	2–1	2–1	2–2	1–1	4–1	2–1	0–2		1–0	2–0	2–0	5–1	1–0	1–1	3–1
Port Vale	3–1	3–1	0–1	1–3	0–0	1–1	2–2	2–0	4–3	1–0	3–1	0–1	1–0	0–3	2–1	1–1	2–0		0–0	3–1	2–1	1–0	1–1	2–1
Reading	7–1	0–0	7–0	4–2	0–0	3–2	1–1	4–2	1–1	2–0	4–0	1–1	5–0	2–0	3–1	0–2	4–0	3–0		0–2	3–1	0–0	2–1	1–0
Southend	4–2	6–1	3–1	1–1	1–1	4–2	5–2	5–1	4–0	1–0	0–1	0–3	3–0	3–0	0–2	3–2	1–0	1–1	3–3		8–2	3–0	0–1	5–1
Swindon Town	4–0	2–1	0–0	1–0	1–2	1–1	2–0	1–0	2–0	2–0	2–0	0–1	2–0	1–0	1–0	2–3	1–2	2–1	1–1	4–1		2–1	1–1	3–2
Torquay United	1–2	0–2	3–1	4–1	1–2	4–1	4–1	2–0	1–2	0–1	2–1	2–1	3–4	1–1	1–5	3–2	1–3	3–2	2–1	2–2	1–0		3–2	3–2
Walsall	3–1	0–1	1–0	3–1	1–2	4–2	0–0	0–2	2–1	2–0	1–1	4–0	0–0	1–0	0–1	0–2	1–1	2–0	1–2	1–2	1–0	3–1		1–0
Watford	1–2	2–1	1–1	1–2	1–0	2–0	1–0	1–2	5–0	0–2	2–0	0–0	0–2	0–1	0–2	1–1	1–1	2–0	3–1	1–3	1–2	2–2	1–3	

Updated to match(es) played on unknown. Source: Ian Laschke: Rothmans Book of Football League Records 1888–89 to 1978–79. Macdonald and Jane’s, London & Sydney, 1980.
Legend: Blue = home team win; Yellow = draw; Red = away team win.

=== Maps ===
Locations of the Football League Third Division South London teams 1950–1951
Locations of the Football League Third Division South teams 1950–1951

== Attendances ==
=== Division One ===
No.	Club	Average
1	Tottenham Hotspur FC	55,509
2	Arsenal FC	50,474
3	Newcastle United FC	46,651
4	Everton FC	42,924
5	Sheffield Wednesday FC	41,222
6	Sunderland AFC	39,766
7	Chelsea FC	39,667
8	Wolverhampton Wanderers FC	39,616
9	Manchester United	39,008
10	Aston Villa FC	38,369
11	Liverpool FC	38,294
12	Middlesbrough FC	36,123
13	Bolton Wanderers FC	33,142
14	Portsmouth FC	32,794
15	West Bromwich Albion FC	30,957
16	Fulham FC	30,527
17	Charlton Athletic FC	29,293
18	Burnley FC	28,296
19	Huddersfield Town AFC	27,141
20	Stoke City FC	25,791
21	Blackpool FC	25,595
22	Derby County FC	23,259

=== Division Two ===
No.	Club	Average
1	Manchester City FC	35,016
2	Hull City AFC	31,872
3	Preston North End FC	31,259
4	Notts County FC	30,115
5	Cardiff City FC	28,412
6	Sheffield United FC	27,488
7	Leicester City FC	27,293
8	Coventry City FC	26,694
9	Leeds United FC	26,105
10	Blackburn Rovers FC	24,830
11	Birmingham City FC	24,550
12	Doncaster Rovers FC	22,838
13	Southampton FC	21,816
14	West Ham United FC	21,540
15	Brentford FC	19,593
16	Swansea City AFC	19,398
17	Barnsley FC	19,159
18	Queens Park Rangers FC	16,866
19	Grimsby Town FC	16,050
20	Bury FC	15,101
21	Luton Town FC	14,319
22	Chesterfield FC	13,077

=== Division Three ===
No.	Club	Average
1	Norwich City FC	24,503
2	Nottingham Forest FC	22,636
3	Millwall FC	20,161
4	Bristol City FC	18,457
5	Bristol Rovers FC	17,763
6	Plymouth Argyle FC	16,542
7	Reading FC	15,973
8	Crystal Palace FC	13,828
9	Oldham Athletic FC	13,579
10	Ipswich Town FC	13,130
11	Rotherham United FC	12,957
12	AFC Bournemouth	12,730
13	Bradford City AFC	12,512
14	Gillingham FC	12,256
15	Bradford Park Avenue AFC	12,253
16	Carlisle United FC	11,696
17	Newport County AFC	11,506
18	Leyton Orient FC	11,194
19	Brighton & Hove Albion FC	11,163
20	Port Vale FC	10,832
21	Swindon Town FC	10,712
22	Colchester United FC	10,573
23	Lincoln City FC	10,440
24	Southend United FC	10,362
25	Northampton Town FC	10,308
26	Mansfield Town FC	10,262
27	Stockport County FC	10,006
28	Tranmere Rovers	9,869
29	Exeter City FC	9,771
30	Watford FC	9,615
31	Scunthorpe United FC	9,533
32	Shrewsbury Town FC	9,096
33	Wrexham AFC	8,803
34	Walsall FC	8,788
35	Gateshead AFC	8,500
36	Torquay United FC	7,805
37	York City FC	7,513
38	Hartlepool United FC	7,492
39	Aldershot Town FC	7,349
40	Halifax Town AFC	7,199
41	Crewe Alexandra FC	6,736
42	Rochdale AFC	6,519
43	Chester City FC	5,951
44	Barrow AFC	5,778
45	Darlington FC	5,680
46	Southport FC	5,650
47	Accrington Stanley FC	4,562
48	New Brighton AFC	4,046

== See also ==
- 1950-51 in English football
