= Gerdo Hazelhekke =

Dutch footballer

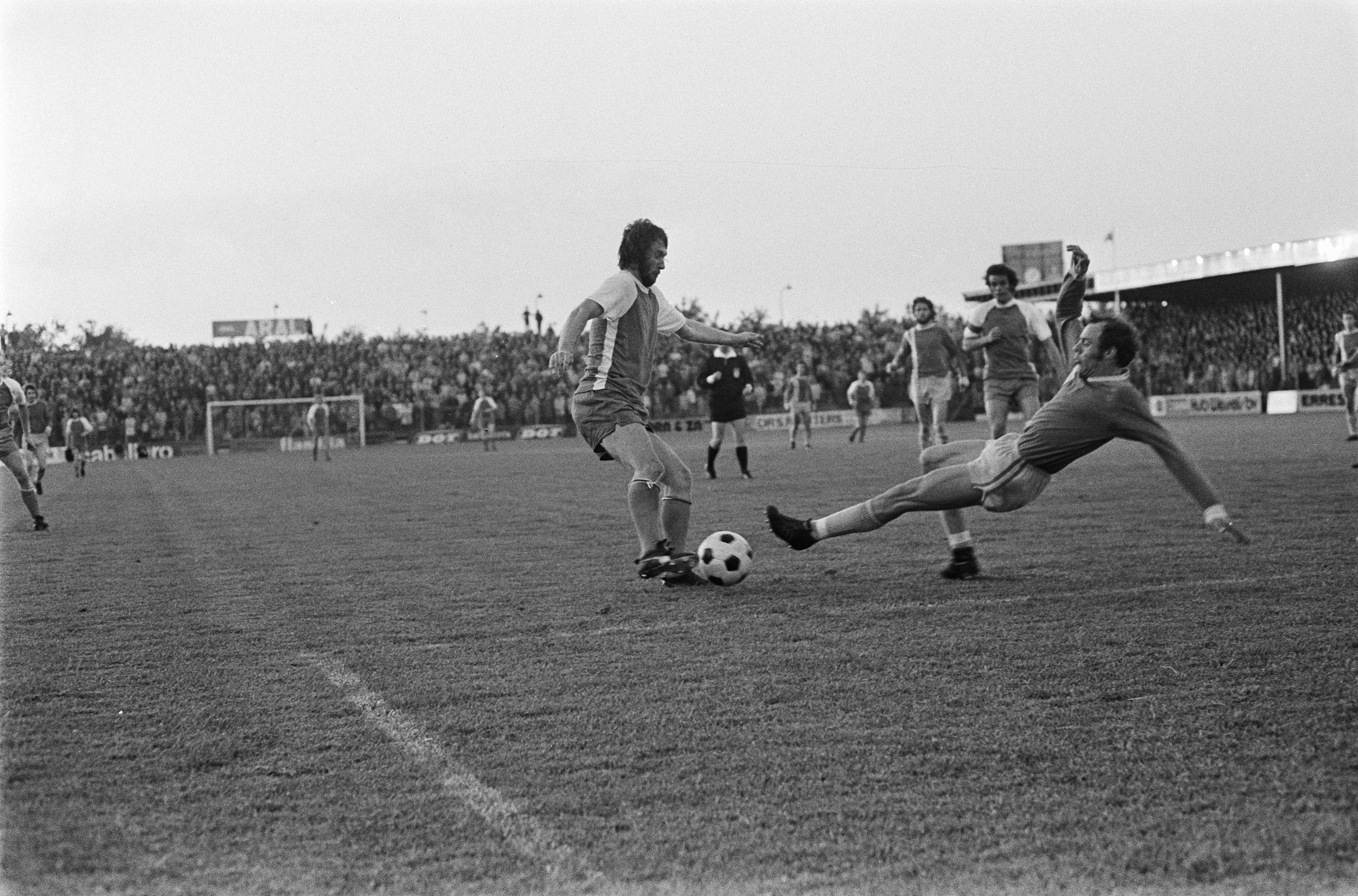
- Hazelhekke (left) in 1974 against Fortuna S

Personal information
- Date of birth: 28 February 1950 (age 76)
- Place of birth: Utrecht, Netherlands
- Position: Forward

Senior career*
| Years | Team | Apps | (Gls) |
| 1970–1971 | NEC | 6 | (2) |
| 1971–1974 | Wageningen | 102 | (60) |
| 1974–1977 | De Graafschap | 85 | (29) |
| 1977–1981 | Wageningen | 118 | (60) |
| 1981–1982 | Go Ahead Eagles | 31 | (11) |
| Total | | 342 | (162) |
- * Club domestic league appearances and goals

Gerdo Hazelhekke (born 28 February 1950 in Utrecht) is a retired football player who played as a forward during his professional football career. He is a two-time topscorer of the Dutch Eerste Divisie.

== Career ==
Born in Utrecht and raised in Ede, the bearded Hazelhekke was a prolific goalscorer in the Dutch professional leagues and played in Wageningen's famous 6-1 cup win over giants PSV. He was the Eerste Divisie top goalscorer in 1972 and 1980.

After retiring as a player, Hazelhekke owned a couple of sport shops and was manager of an import and sales company in the USA. He also worked as a tax driver.
