= Tommy Briggs =

English footballer and manager

Personal information
- Full name: Thomas Henry Briggs
- Date of birth: 27 November 1923
- Place of birth: Chesterfield, England
- Date of death: 10 February 1984 (aged 60)
- Place of death: Grimsby, England
- Height: 6 ft 0 in (1.83 m)
- Position: Centre forward

Senior career*
| Years | Team | Apps | (Gls) |
| 1946 | Plymouth Argyle | 0 | (0) |
| 1947–1950 | Grimsby Town | 116 | (78) |
| 1950–1951 | Coventry City | 11 | (7) |
| 1951–1952 | Birmingham City | 50 | (22) |
| 1952–1957 | Blackburn Rovers | 194 | (140) |
| 1957–1958 | Grimsby Town | 19 | (9) |
| 1959–1960 | Glentoran | | |
| Total | | 390 | (256) |

International career
| 1950 | England B | 1 | (1) |

Managerial career
- 1959–1960: Glentoran (player-manager)
- * Club domestic league appearances and goals

Thomas Henry Briggs (27 November 1923 – 10 February 1984) was an English professional footballer who played as a centre forward. He was born in Chesterfield, Derbyshire, and died in Grimsby, Lincolnshire. He still holds a record for scoring seven goals in a single match for Blackburn Rovers against Bristol Rovers.

Briggs started his career at Grimsby Town in 1947. In 1950 he signed for Coventry City but did not settle. He moved on to Birmingham City but did not settle there either, eventually arriving at Blackburn Rovers. He played 194 games and scored 140 goals for Rovers before returning to Grimsby in 1958.

He joined Glentoran as player-manager in March 1959, led them to runners-up spot in the 1959–60 Irish League, and left by mutual consent in late 1960.

He played and scored for the England B-team against Switzerland B in 1950.

== Honours ==
=== Glentoran ===
Gold Cup Winners: 1960
