= 2002–03 PSV Eindhoven season =

PSV Eindhoven
2002–03 season
- Head coach: Guus Hiddink
- Stadium: Philips Stadion
- Eredivisie: 1st
- Johan Cruyff Shield: Runners-up
- KNVB Cup: Semi-finals
- Champions League: Group stage
- Top goalscorer: League: Mateja Kežman (35); All: Mateja Kežman (40)
Home colours	Away colours

During the 2002–03 Dutch football season, PSV Eindhoven competed in the Eredivisie.

== Season summary ==
PSV won the title, pipping Ajax by a single point. There was less success in Europe: they finished bottom of their group, and also suffered the indignity of conceding the fastest goal in Champions League history, with Gilberto Silva scoring 21 seconds after kick-off in PSV's 4-0 home loss to Arsenal.

== First-team squad ==
Squad at end of season

Note: Flags indicate national team as defined under FIFA eligibility rules; some limited exceptions apply. Players may hold more than one non-FIFA nationality.

No.	Pos.	Nation	Player
1	GK	NED	Frank Kooiman
2	DF	NED	André Ooijer
3	DF	NED	Kevin Hofland
4	DF	NED	Ernest Faber
5	DF	DEN	Jan Heintze
6	MF	NED	Mark van Bommel
8	FW	NED	Jan Vennegoor of Hesselink
9	FW	SCG	Mateja Kežman
10	MF	NED	Arnold Bruggink
11	MF	NED	Arjen Robben
13	MF	NED	Remco van der Schaaf
14	MF	SUI	Johann Vogel
15	DF	AUS	Lindsay Wilson

No.	Pos.	Nation	Player
16	DF	NED	Theo Lucius
17	MF	GEO	Giorgi Gakhokidze
19	MF	DEN	Dennis Rommedahl
21	MF	KOR	Park Ji-sung
22	DF	NED	Wilfred Bouma
23	GK	NED	Ronald Waterreus
24	MF	BRA	Marquinho
26	MF	BRA	Leandro
29	DF	KOR	Lee Young-pyo
30	DF	DEN	Kasper Bøgelund
31	DF	NED	Jürgen Dirkx
50	GK	NED	Gino Coutinho

=== Left club during season ===
Note: Flags indicate national team as defined under FIFA eligibility rules; some limited exceptions apply. Players may hold more than one non-FIFA nationality.

No.	Pos.	Nation	Player
1	GK	NED	Jelle ten Rouwelaar (on loan to Groningen)
7	MF	MAR	Adil Ramzi (on loan to Córdoba)
18	DF	GHA	Eric Addo (on loan to Roda JC)
21	DF	NED	Léon Hese (on loan to FC Eindhoven)

No.	Pos.	Nation	Player
25	MF	NED	John de Jong (on loan to Heerenveen)
27	DF	NED	Michael Lamey (on loan to AZ)
28	FW	NED	Klaas-Jan Huntelaar (on loan to De Graafschap)
29	FW	BRA	Claudio (on loan to Luzern)

== Results ==
=== UEFA Champions League ===
==== Group stage ====
17 September 2002	Auxerre (France)	0–0	(Netherlands) PSV Eindhoven	Stade l'Abbé-Deschamps, Auxerre
20:45		Report		Attendance: 11,902; Referee: Alfredo Trentalange (Italy)

25 September 2002	PSV Eindhoven (Netherlands)	0–4	(England) Arsenal	Philips Stadion, Eindhoven
20:45		Report	Gilberto 1'; Ljungberg 66'; Henry 81', 90+2'	Attendance: 29,500; Referee: Ľuboš Micheľ (Slovakia)

2 October 2002	PSV Eindhoven (Netherlands)	1–3	(Germany) Borussia Dortmund	Philips Stadion, Eindhoven
20:45	Van der Schaaf 74'	Report	Koller 21'; Rosický 69'; Amoroso 90+2'	Attendance: 26,100; Referee: Pierluigi Collina (Italy)

22 October 2002	Borussia Dortmund (Germany)	1–1	(Netherlands) PSV Eindhoven	Westfalenstadion, Dortmund
20:45	Koller 10'	Report	Bruggink 47'	Attendance: 47,000; Referee: Lucílio Batista (Portugal)

30 October 2002	PSV Eindhoven (Netherlands)	3–0	(France) Auxerre	Philips Stadion, Eindhoven
20:45	Bruggink 34'; Rommedahl 48'; Robben 64'	Report		Attendance: 27,500; Referee: Knud Erik Fisker (Denmark)

12 November 2002	Arsenal (England)	0–0	(Netherlands) PSV Eindhoven	Highbury, London
20:45		Report		Attendance: 35,274; Referee: Tom Henning Øvrebø (Norway)
