= 2001–02 PSV Eindhoven season =

PSV Eindhoven
2001–02 season
- Head coach: Eric Gerets
- Stadium: Philips Stadion
- Eredivisie: 2nd
- KNVB Cup: Semi-finals
- Johan Cruyff Shield: Winners
- Champions League: Group stage
- UEFA Cup: Quarter-finals
Home colours	Away colours

During the 2001–02 Dutch football season, PSV Eindhoven competed in the Eredivisie.

== Season summary ==
PSV failed to defend their Eredivisie title, finishing second, five points behind champions Ajax. Manager Eric Gerets left in June that summer and was replaced by Guus Hiddink.

== Kit ==
PSV's kit was sponsored by Philips.

== First-team squad ==
Squad at end of season

Note: Flags indicate national team as defined under FIFA eligibility rules; some limited exceptions apply. Players may hold more than one non-FIFA nationality.

No.	Pos.	Nation	Player
1	GK	YUG	Ivica Kralj
2	DF	NED	André Ooijer
4	DF	NED	Ernest Faber
5	DF	DEN	Jan Heintze
6	MF	NED	Mark van Bommel
7	MF	MAR	Adil Ramzi
8	FW	NED	Jan Vennegoor of Hesselink
9	FW	YUG	Mateja Kežman
10	FW	NED	Arnold Bruggink
14	MF	SUI	Johann Vogel
15	MF	NED	John de Jong
16	DF	NED	Theo Lucius
17	MF	GEO	Giorgi Gakhokidze

No.	Pos.	Nation	Player
18	DF	GHA	Eric Addo
19	MF	DEN	Dennis Rommedahl
20	GK	NED	Patrick Lodewijks
21	DF	RUS	Yuriy Nikiforov
22	DF	NED	Wilfred Bouma
23	GK	NED	Ronald Waterreus
24	MF	BRA	Marquinho
29	DF	NED	Kevin Hofland
30	DF	DEN	Kasper Bøgelund
33	DF	NED	Léon Hese
12	GK	NED	Gino Coutinho
27	FW	BRA	Claudio

== Results ==
=== Champions League ===
==== Group stage ====
11 September 2001	Nantes (France)	4–1	(Netherlands) PSV Eindhoven	Stade de la Beaujoire, Nantes
20:45	André 5'; Quint 10' (pen.); Dalmat 44'; Vahirua 75'	Report	De Jong 90+3'	Attendance: 23,481; Referee: Juan Fernández Marin (Spain)

19 September 2001	PSV Eindhoven (Netherlands)	3–1	(Turkey) Galatasaray	GelreDome, Arnhem
20:45	Bruggink 38'; Faber 53'; Kežman 90+4'	Report	Ümit Karan 68'	Attendance: 22,325; Referee: Manuel Mejuto González (Spain)

26 September 2001	PSV Eindhoven (Netherlands)	1–0	(Italy) Lazio	Philips Stadion, Eindhoven
20:45	Hofland 40'	Report		Attendance: 27,000; Referee: Mike McCurry (Scotland)

16 October 2001	Lazio (Italy)	2–1	(Netherlands) PSV Eindhoven	Stadio Olimpico, Rome
20:45	Fiore 39'; López 55' (pen.)	Report	Kežman 56'	Attendance: 18,417; Referee: Antonio López Nieto (Spain)

24 October 2001	PSV Eindhoven (Netherlands)	0–0	(France) Nantes	Philips Stadion, Eindhoven
20:45		Report		Attendance: 31,200; Referee: Wolfgang Stark (Germany)

30 October 2001	Galatasaray (Turkey)	2–0	(Netherlands) PSV Eindhoven	Ali Sami Yen Stadium, Istanbul
20:45	Yalçın 26'; Erdem 50'	Report		Attendance: 22,100; Referee: Ľuboš Micheľ (Slovakia)
