= 2002–03 in Dutch football =

The 2002–03 season in Dutch football was the 47th season in the Eredivisie, where PSV claimed the title and Utrecht won the Dutch National Cup after defeating Feyenoord in the final.

== Johan Cruijff-schaal ==
August 11, 2002

Ajax	3–1	PSV
Van der Vaart 41', 76'; Mido 54'		Kežman 10'

Amsterdam Arena, Amsterdam
Attendance: 40,000
Referee: Van Hulten

== Eredivisie ==
Position	Team	Points	Played	Won	Drawn	Lost	For	Against	Difference
1	PSV	84	34	26	6	2	87	20	+67
2	Ajax	83	34	26	5	3	96	32	+64
3	Feyenoord	80	34	25	5	4	89	39	+50
4	NAC Breda	52	34	13	13	8	42	31	+11
5	NEC	51	34	14	9	11	41	40	+1
6	Roda JC	50	34	14	8	12	58	54	+4
7	Heerenveen	47	34	13	8	13	61	55	+6
8	Utrecht	47	34	12	11	11	49	49	0
9	RKC Waalwijk	46	34	14	4	16	44	51	-7
10	AZ	44	34	12	8	14	50	69	-19
11	Willem II	42	34	11	9	14	48	51	-3
12	Twente	41	34	10	11	13	36	45	-9
13	RBC Roosendaal	41	36	10	6	18	33	54	-21
14	Vitesse	33	34	8	9	17	37	51	-14
15	Groningen	32	34	7	11	16	28	44	-16
16	Zwolle	32	34	8	8	18	31	62	-31
17	Excelsior	23	34	5	8	21	38	72	-34
18	De Graafschap	23	34	6	5	23	35	84	-49

- Champions League : PSV
- Champions League qualification : Ajax
- UEFA Cup : Feyenoord, NAC Breda, NEC and Utrecht
- Promotion / relegation play-offs ("Nacompetitie") : Zwolle and Excelsior
- Relegated : De Graafschap

=== Top scorers ===
Position	Player	Nationality	Club	Goals
1	Mateja Kežman	(Serbia)	PSV	35
2	Pierre van Hooijdonk	(Netherlands)	Feyenoord	28
3	Dirk Kuyt	(Netherlands)	Utrecht	20
4	Thomas Buffel	(Belgium)	Feyenoord	18
–	Rafael van der Vaart	(Netherlands)	Ajax	18
6	Rick Hoogendorp	(Netherlands)	RKC Waalwijk	16
7	Matthew Amoah	(Ghana)	Vitesse	15
8	Zlatan Ibrahimović	(Sweden)	Ajax	13
9	Orlando Engelaar	(Netherlands)	NAC Breda	12
–	Arjen Robben	(Netherlands)	PSV	12

=== Awards ===
==== Dutch Footballer of the Year ====
- 2002–03 — Mateja Kežman (PSV)

==== Dutch Golden Shoe Winner ====
- 2002 — Cristian Chivu (Ajax)
- 2003 — Dirk Kuyt (Utrecht)

=== PSV winning squad 2002–03 ===
Goal

- (Netherlands) Frank Kooiman
- (Belgium) Yves Lenaerts
- (Netherlands) Jelle ten Rouwelaar
- (Netherlands) Ronald Waterreus

Defence

- (Ghana) Eric Addo
- (Denmark) Kasper Bøgelund
- (Netherlands) Wilfred Bouma
- (Netherlands) Robert van Boxel
- (Netherlands) Jürgen Dirkx
- (Netherlands) Ernest Faber
- (Denmark) Jan Heintze
- (Netherlands) Léon Hese
- (Netherlands) Kevin Hofland
- (Netherlands) Michael Lamey
- (South Korea) Lee Young-pyo
- (Netherlands) André Ooijer
- (Australia) Lindsay Wilson

Midfield

- (Netherlands) Mark van Bommel
- (Georgia (country)) Giorgi Gakhokidze
- (Netherlands) John de Jong
- (Brazil) Leandro
- (Netherlands) Theo Lucius
- (Brazil) Marquinho
- (South Korea) Park Ji-sung
- (Morocco) Adil Ramzi
- (Denmark) Dennis Rommedahl
- (Netherlands) Remco van der Schaaf
- (Switzerland) Johann Vogel

Attack

- (Netherlands) Arnold Bruggink
- (Netherlands) Arjen Robben
- (Brazil) Claudio
- (Netherlands) Klaas-Jan Huntelaar
- (Federal Republic of Yugoslavia) Mateja Kežman
- (Netherlands) Jan Vennegoor of Hesselink

Management

- (Netherlands) Guus Hiddink (Coach)
- (Netherlands) Erwin Koeman (Assistant)
- (Netherlands) Fred Rutten (Assistant)

== Eerste Divisie ==
Position	Team	Points	Played	Won	Drawn	Lost	For	Against	Difference
1	ADO Den Haag	83	34	26	5	3	74	20	+54
2	Emmen	75	34	23	6	5	66	33	+33
3	Helmond Sport	64	34	19	7	8	72	44	+28
4	Heracles Almelo	60	34	18	6	10	78	52	+26
5	FC Den Bosch	60	34	18	6	10	62	38	+24
6	Volendam	60	34	18	6	10	61	44	+17
7	Go Ahead Eagles	58	34	17	7	10	74	55	+19
8	Sparta Rotterdam	45	34	13	6	15	60	62	-2
9	TOP Oss	44	34	13	5	16	48	68	-20
10	FC Eindhoven	41	34	11	8	15	41	49	-8
11	Cambuur	40	34	12	4	18	54	77	-23
12	Stormvogels Telstar	38	34	11	5	18	37	45	-8
13	VVV-Venlo	37	34	10	7	17	42	60	-18
14	HFC Haarlem	35	34	9	8	17	31	63	-32
15	Fortuna Sittard	32	34	8	8	18	43	53	-10
16	MVV Maastricht	32	34	8	8	18	35	53	-18
17	Veednam	32	34	8	8	18	37	66	-29
18	Dordrecht	24	34	6	6	22	31	64	-33

- Promoted : ADO Den Haag
- Promotion / Relegation play-offs ("Nacompetitie") : Emmen, Heracles, Den Bosch, Volendam and Go Ahead Eagles

=== Top scorers ===
Position	Player	Nationality	Club	Goals
1	Donny de Groot	(Netherlands)	Emmen	30
2	Rik Platvoet	(Netherlands)	Heracles Almelo	26
3	Danny Koevermans	(Netherlands)	Sparta Rotterdam	25
4	Stefan Jansen	(Netherlands)	FC Den Bosch	20
5	Jan Bruin	(Netherlands)	Cambuur	19
6	Ugur Yildirim	(Netherlands)	Go Ahead Eagles	18
7	Roy Stroeve	(Netherlands)	ADO Den Haag	17
–	Koen van de Laak	(Netherlands)	FC Den Bosch	17
–	Ronald Hamming	(Netherlands)	Fortuna Sittard	17

== Promotion and relegation ==
=== Group A ===
Position	Team	Points	Played	Won	Drawn	Lost	For	Against	Difference
1	Zwolle	14	6	4	2	0	12	5	+7
2	Helmond Sport	10	6	3	1	2	9	10	-1
3	FC Den Bosch	10	6	2	1	3	7	10	-3
4	Go Ahead Eagles	3	6	1	0	5	9	12	-3

=== Group B ===
Position	Team	Points	Played	Won	Drawn	Lost	For	Against	Difference
1	Volendam	12	6	4	0	2	12	7	+5
2	Emmen	9	6	3	0	3	6	6	0
3	Excelsior	9	6	3	0	3	8	9	-1
4	Heracles Almelo	6	6	2	0	4	6	10	-4

- Stayed : Zwolle
- Promoted : Volendam
- Relegated : Excelsior

== KNVB Cup ==
Quarter-finals
March 4
Excelsior	1
Utrecht	3
March 5
PSV	2
Heerenveen	1
March 5
Feyenoord	3
Vitesse	1
March 5
Ajax	4
Groningen	1

Semi-finals
April 15
Utrecht	2
PSV	1
April 16
Feyenoord	1
Ajax	0

Final
June 1 – Rotterdam
Feyenoord	1
Utrecht	4

== See also ==
- Sparta Rotterdam season 2002–03
