= 2000–01 PSV Eindhoven season =

PSV Eindhoven
2000–01 season
- Head coach: Eric Gerets
- Stadium: Philips Stadion
- Eredivisie: 1st
- KNVB Cup: Runners-up
- Johan Cruyff Shield: Winners
- Champions League: Group stage
- UEFA Cup: Quarter-finals
- Top goalscorer: League: Mateja Kežman (24); All: Mateja Kežman (31)
Home colours	Away colours

During the 2000–01 Dutch football season, PSV Eindhoven competed in the Eredivisie.

== Season summary ==
PSV claimed the Eredivisie title for the second year in a row with 83 points in total. The margin to the second-placed Feyenoord was 17 points. In the KNVB Cup, the team lost in the final against Twente. In the Champions League, the team was knocked out in the group stage, finishing third behind Anderlecht and Manchester United. In the UEFA Cup (now known as Europa League), the team was knocked out in the quarter-finals against Kaiserslautern with two 1-0 defeats.

== Kit ==
PSV's kit was manufactured by Nike and sponsored by Philips

== First-team squad ==
Squad at end of season

Note: Flags indicate national team as defined under FIFA eligibility rules; some limited exceptions apply. Players may hold more than one non-FIFA nationality.

No.	Pos.	Nation	Player
2	DF	(Netherlands) NED	André Ooijer
3	DF	(Netherlands) NED	Jürgen Dirkx
4	DF	(Netherlands) NED	Ernest Faber
5	DF	(Denmark) DEN	Jan Heintze
6	MF	(Netherlands) NED	Mark van Bommel (captain)
7	FW	(Morocco) MAR	Adil Ramzi
9	FW	(Federal Republic of Yugoslavia) YUG	Mateja Kežman
10	FW	(Netherlands) NED	Arnold Bruggink
11	MF	(Finland) FIN	Joonas Kolkka
13	DF	(Netherlands) NED	Chris van der Weerden
14	MF	(Switzerland) SUI	Johann Vogel
15	MF	(Netherlands) NED	John de Jong

No.	Pos.	Nation	Player
16	DF	(Netherlands) NED	Theo Lucius
17	MF	(Netherlands) NED	Björn van der Doelen
18	DF	(Ghana) GHA	Eric Addo
19	MF	(Denmark) DEN	Dennis Rommedahl
20	GK	(Netherlands) NED	Patrick Lodewijks
21	DF	(Russia) RUS	Yuriy Nikiforov
22	DF	(Netherlands) NED	Wilfred Bouma
23	GK	(Netherlands) NED	Ronald Waterreus
24	MF	(Romania) ROU	Ovidiu Stângă
29	DF	(Netherlands) NED	Kevin Hofland
30	DF	(Denmark) DEN	Kasper Bøgelund
32	MF	(Georgia (country)) GEO	Giorgi Gakhokidze
26	GK	(Netherlands) NED	Gino Coutinho

== Eredivisie ==
Pos	Team	Pld	W	D	L	GF	GA	GD	Pts	Qualification or relegation
1	PSV Eindhoven (C)	34	25	8	1	73	23	+50	83	Qualification to Champions League group stage
2	Feyenoord	34	21	3	10	67	37	+30	66	Qualification to Champions League group stage
3	Ajax	34	18	7	9	85	43	+42	61	Qualification to Champions League third qualifying round
4	Roda JC Kerkrade	34	17	8	9	59	41	+18	59	Qualification to UEFA Cup first round (Note: FC Twente qualified for the UEFA Cup by winning the 2000–01 KNVB Cup.)
5	Utrecht	34	17	8	9	58	43	+15	59	Qualification to UEFA Cup first round

Source: voetbal.com
Rules for classification: 1) Points; 2) Goal difference; 3) Goals scored; 4) Head-to-head points; 5) Head-to-head goal difference; 6) Head-to-head away goals scored; 7) Play-off if relevant for deciding champion, relegation or participating in a European league, otherwise by draw. 8) Penalty shoot-out (only after a play-off)
(C) Champions
