= Ivica Kralj =

Montenegrin footballer (born 1973)

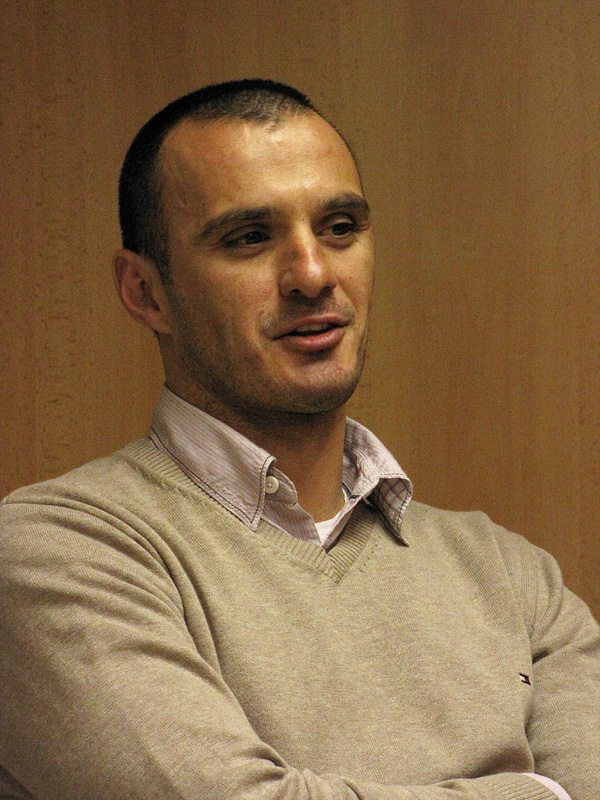
- Kralj in 2009

Personal information
- Date of birth: 26 March 1973 (age 53)
- Place of birth: Kotor, SR Montenegro, SFR Yugoslavia
- Height: 1.97 m (6 ft 6 in)
- Position: Goalkeeper

Youth career
- Arsenal Tivat
- 1987–1989: Partizan

Senior career*
Years	Team	Apps	(Gls)
1989–1998	Partizan	69	(0)
1992–1993	→ Zvezdara (loan)		
1993–1994	→ Jastrebac Niš (loan)	13	(0)
1998–1999	Porto	7	(0)
1999	→ Radnički Kragujevac (loan)	3	(0)
1999–2002	PSV	7	(0)
2001	→ Partizan (loan)	6	(0)
2003–2007	Partizan	74	(0)
2007	Rostov	0	(0)
2008–2009	Spartak Trnava	17	(0)
Total		196	(0)

International career
1996–2001	FR Yugoslavia	41	(0)
- * Club domestic league appearances and goals

Ivica Kralj (Serbian Cyrillic: Ивица Краљ, pronounced [ǐvitsa krâʎ]; born 26 March 1973) is a Montenegrin former professional footballer who played as a goalkeeper.

During his playing career, Kralj was best known for his time at Partizan, having three spells at the club and winning five major trophies. He also played for Porto and PSV.

At international level, Kralj represented FR Yugoslavia at the 1998 FIFA World Cup and UEFA Euro 2000, reaching the knockout stage in both tournaments.

== Club career ==
=== Partizan ===
Born in Kotor and raised in Tivat, Kralj started out at his local club Arsenal Tivat, before joining Partizan as a trainee in the summer of 1987. He broke into their first team at the age of 16, sitting on the bench during a 5–4 away loss to Celtic in the second leg of the European Cup Winners' Cup first round on 27 September 1989. In order to gain experience, Kralj was later sent out on loan to Zvezdara (1992–93) and Jastrebac Niš (1993–94), before returning to Partizan. He made his league debut for the club in the 1995–96 season, as they won the championship title. In the 1996–97 campaign, Partizan won their second consecutive title, as Kralj became the club's undisputed first-choice goalkeeper and earned his first national team cap. He also won the FR Yugoslavia Cup in the 1997–98 season, before going abroad.

=== Porto ===
In the summer of 1998, Kralj moved to Portugal and signed with Porto. He initially established himself as the club's first-choice goalkeeper, helping them win the Supertaça on 9 September 1998. However, following Vítor Baía's return to Porto in the 1999 winter transfer window, Kralj completely lost his place in the starting lineup. He was subsequently loaned to Radnički Kragujevac until the end of the 1998–99 season.

=== PSV ===
In the 1999 summer transfer window, Kralj was transferred to Dutch club PSV. He featured in the UEFA Champions League of that year where PSV suffered a 4–1 defeat to Rangers in the group stage. Shortly after, Kralj suffered a hamstring injury, ruling him out for five months. He returned to action in April 2000, but was mainly a backup to Ronald Waterreus and Patrick Lodewijks, as the club convincingly won the domestic league in his debut season at Philips Stadion. After failing to make any appearances in the first half of the 2000–01 season, Kralj was loaned to his former club Partizan in January 2001. He added one more national cup trophy to his collection, despite not getting any game time in the competition. After returning to PSV, Kralj was the club's third-choice goalkeeper behind Waterreus and Lodewijks. He eventually left the club by mutual consent in 2002.

=== Return to Partizan ===
In June 2003, Kralj made another return to Partizan, signing a one-year deal. He quickly found his form and helped the team qualify for the Champions League in the 2003–04 campaign, saving two penalties in the shootout against Newcastle United at St James' Park in the final qualifying round. However, Kralj failed to make any appearances in the group stage due to an injury. He eventually signed a three-year extension to his contract with Partizan in May 2004. After recovering from injury, Kralj was a first team regular, helping his team win the league title in 2005, with an unbeaten record. He left the club at the end of his contract, stating his disappointment towards some members of the club's board.

=== Rostov ===
In August 2007, Kralj moved to Russia as a free agent and signed with Rostov. He was joined by his former teammate Albert Nađ. However, Kralj failed to make any competitive appearance for the club, as they suffered relegation from the top flight after finishing bottom of the table. He was released by Rostov in December 2007, alongside Nađ and several other players.

=== Spartak Trnava ===
In July 2008, Kralj moved to Slovak club Spartak Trnava, signed by his former manager Vladimir Vermezović, on a two-year deal. He agreed to leave the club in late 2009, due to his chronic injury problems, eventually retiring from the game.

== International career ==
Kralj made his international debut for FR Yugoslavia on 28 December 1996, coming on as a late second-half substitute for Zvonko Milojević in a 3–2 friendly win away to Argentina. He subsequently became the first-choice goalkeeper for the national team under Slobodan Santrač, helping them to qualify for the 1998 FIFA World Cup. In the final tournament, Kralj played the full 90 minutes in all of his team's four games, as they were eliminated by the Netherlands in the knockout stage.

Despite not playing regularly at club level, Kralj was named by Vujadin Boškov in Yugoslavia's final UEFA Euro 2000 squad, choosing the number 22 shirt. They went on to reach the quarter-finals of the competition, where the team was eliminated by the Netherlands. The hosts achieved a convincing 6–1 victory, including a hat-trick by Patrick Kluivert and a brace by Marc Overmars.

In June 2001, after a one-year absence from the national team, Kralj was selected to represent his country at the Kirin Cup. He made his last appearance for FR Yugoslavia in a 1–1 home draw with Slovenia on 5 September 2001, as the country failed to qualify for the 2002 FIFA World Cup. Over a five-year international career, Kralj earned 41 caps for Yugoslavia.

== Post-playing career ==
After hanging up his boots, Kralj worked for some time as a player agent. He was appointed as president of Mačva Šabac in January 2015. In November 2020, after spending five and a half years in charge, Kralj stepped down from his position.

In September 2022, Kralj was appointed as sporting director of Partizan. In September 2024, Kralj was dismissed from the position, and was replaced by previous sporting director Ivica Iliev.

== Career statistics ==
=== Club ===
Appearances and goals by club, season and competition
Club	Season	League			National cup		League cup		Continental		Other		Total	
Club	Season	Division	Apps	Goals	Apps	Goals	Apps	Goals	Apps	Goals	Apps	Goals	Apps	Goals
Zvezdara (loan)	1992–93	Belgrade Zone League			—		—		—		—			
Jastrebac Niš (loan)	1993–94	First League of FR Yugoslavia	13	0	—		—		—		—		13	0
Partizan	1995–96	First League of FR Yugoslavia	13	0	4	0	—		—		—		17	0
Partizan	1996–97	First League of FR Yugoslavia	30	0	0	0	—		0	0	—		30	0
Partizan	1997–98	First League of FR Yugoslavia	26	0	9	0	—		2	0	—		37	0
Partizan	Total		69	0	13	0	—		2	0	—		84	0
Porto	1998–99	Primeira Divisão	7	0	0	0	0	0	3	0	2 (Note: Appearances in Supertaça Cândido de Oliveira)	0	12	0
Radnički Kragujevac (loan)	1998–99	First League of FR Yugoslavia	3	0	0	0	—		—		—		3	0
PSV	1999–2000	Eredivisie	4	0	0	0	—		1	0	0	0	5	0
PSV	2000–01	Eredivisie	0	0	0	0	—		0	0	0	0	0	0
PSV	2001–02	Eredivisie	3	0	0	0	—		1	0	0	0	4	0
PSV	Total		7	0	0	0	—		2	0	0	0	9	0
Partizan (loan)	2000–01	First League of FR Yugoslavia	6	0	0	0	—		0	0	—		6	0
Partizan	2003–04	First League of Serbia and Montenegro	18	0	2	0	—		3	0	—		23	0
Partizan	2004–05	First League of Serbia and Montenegro	23	0	3	0	—		11	0	—		37	0
Partizan	2005–06	Serbia and Montenegro SuperLiga	21	0	0	0	—		5	0	—		26	0
Partizan	2006–07	Serbian SuperLiga	12	0	2	0	—		5	0	—		19	0
Partizan	Total		74	0	7	0	—		24	0	—		105	0
Rostov	2007	Russian Premier League	0	0	0	0	—		—		—		0	0
Spartak Trnava	2008–09	Slovak Superliga	13	0	2	0	—		0	0	0	0	15	0
Spartak Trnava	2009–10	Slovak Superliga	4	0	0	0	—		3	0	0	0	7	0
Spartak Trnava	Total		17	0	2	0	—		3	0	0	0	22	0
Career total			196	0	22	0	0	0	34	0	2	0	254	0

=== International ===
Appearances and goals by national team and year
National team	Year	Apps	Goals
FR Yugoslavia	1996	1	0
FR Yugoslavia	1997	11	0
FR Yugoslavia	1998	12	0
FR Yugoslavia	1999	5	0
FR Yugoslavia	2000	8	0
FR Yugoslavia	2001	4	0
Total		41	0

== Honours ==
Partizan

- First League of FR Yugoslavia: 1995–96, 1996–97, 2004–05
- FR Yugoslavia Cup: 1997–98, 2000–01

Porto

- Supertaça Cândido de Oliveira: 1998

PSV

- Eredivisie: 1999–2000, 2001–02
- Johan Cruyff Shield: 2000, 2001
