= Mateja Kežman =

Serbian footballer

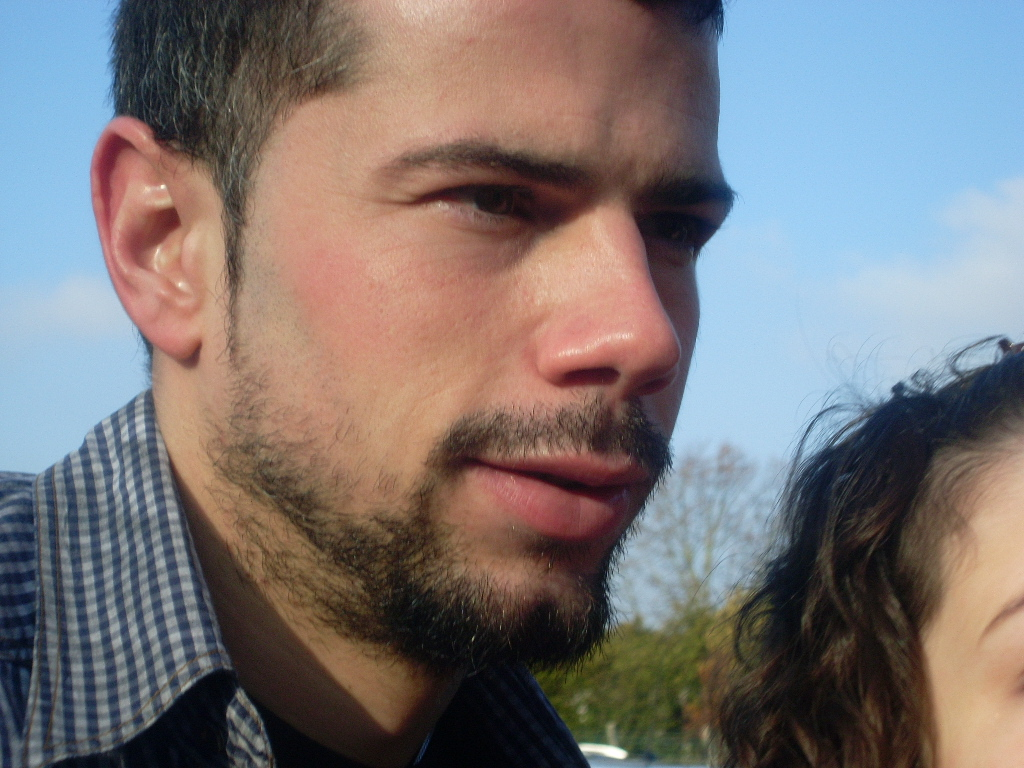
- Kežman in 2009

Personal information
- Full name: Mateja Kežman
- Date of birth: 12 April 1979 (age 47)
- Place of birth: Belgrade, SR Serbia, Yugoslavia
- Height: 1.79 m (5 ft 10 in)
- Position: Striker

Youth career
- 1986–1996: Zemun

Senior career*
Years	Team	Apps	(Gls)
1996–1997	Radnički Pirot	17	(11)
1997	Loznica	13	(5)
1998	Sartid Smederevo	14	(4)
1998–2000	Partizan	54	(33)
2000–2004	PSV Eindhoven	122	(105)
2004–2005	Chelsea	25	(4)
2005–2006	Atlético Madrid	30	(8)
2006–2009	Fenerbahçe	46	(20)
2008–2009	→ Paris Saint-Germain (loan)	21	(3)
2009–2010	Paris Saint-Germain	14	(2)
2009	→ Zenit Saint Petersburg (loan)	10	(2)
2011	South China	6	(2)
2011	BATE Borisov	6	(0)
2012	South China	0	(0)
Total		378	(199)

International career
1996–1997	FR Yugoslavia U18	8	(1)
1998–2000	FR Yugoslavia U21	4	(4)
2000–2006	Serbia and Montenegro	49	(17)
- * Club domestic league appearances and goals

Mateja Kežman (Serbian Cyrillic: Матеја Кежман, pronounced [mǎteja kêʒman]; born 12 April 1979) is a Serbian sports agent and former professional footballer who played as a striker.

After playing in his homeland, Kežman went on to play top-flight football in the Netherlands, England, Spain, Turkey, France, Russia, Hong Kong and Belarus. He is best known for his career at PSV, earning numerous awards and worldwide recognition. Kežman was named Dutch Footballer of the Year in 2003. By the end of his career, he had amassed a record number of championship medals in the top-tier competitions of five different countries. Internationally, Kežman represented FR Yugoslavia / Serbia and Montenegro in one European Championship and one World Cup.

After finishing his professional playing career, Kežman became a sports agent, currently representing Sergej Milinković-Savić among other players. He also served as a director of football at Vojvodina in 2013.

== Early and personal life ==
Kežman's father Zlatko was also a footballer who played as a goalkeeper, spending the majority of his career with Zemun.

His early career at Partizan was disrupted by NATO's airstrikes on Belgrade in 1999. In 2003, he took protection when a Yugoslav criminal threatened to kidnap him and hold PSV to ransom.

Kežman is a devout member of the Serbian Orthodox Church. During his time in the Netherlands, he prayed in the German city of Dortmund to retain his privacy. Although he considers his addiction to tattoos to be a vice, his tattoos are of a religious theme, and while playing he wore an undershirt with a printed icon of Jesus; this drew media attention during his spell in Turkey. He pledged to become a monk in the church.

While playing with Radnički Pirot during the mid 1990s, 17-year-old Kežman began dating high school student Emilija. The two married in 2002 and had three children: son Lazar, daughter Aleksandra, and another son Jakov. The couple's April 2012 separation was followed by a protracted divorce legal proceeding over division of assets. The financial terms of the divorce were finalized in 2015 with Emilija Kežman receiving multiple properties in Herceg Novi, Montenegro that she has reportedly since been monetizing as touristic rentals.

== Club career ==
=== Partizan ===
In the summer of 1998. At the age of 19, Kežman joined Partizan. In the 1998/99 season. He scored six goals in 22 league games, and won the championship title. In that season, he drew attention to himself when, in the 111-th Eternal derby against Red Star, he scored a goal in the last minute, which gave Partizan a 2–1 victory.

In the 1999/00 season. Coach Miodrag Ješić takes the helm on the Partizan bench and then Kežman plays even better games. He scored 27 goals in 32 league games. However, (The Black-Whites) ended that season without a trophy.

In his two seasons at the club, Kežman made a name for himself. He scored a total of 33 league goals in 54 appearances and was the top scorer of the national championship in the 1999–2000 season. He was especially good in the eternal derbies with Red Star, because he scored the same number of goals in 5 games he played.

=== PSV ===
In the summer of 2000, Kežman completed his move to Dutch club PSV. In his debut season, he was the league's top scorer, achieving 24 goals in 33 games as PSV won the title. He also picked up the nickname 'Batman', because the famous theme song was played at Philips Stadion every time he scored. He formed a successful partnership with Arjen Robben, and they gained the epithet 'Batman and Robben', a pun on Batman and Robin.

Kežman went to score 81 goals over the following three seasons with PSV. His best season in terms of both goals and appearances was 2002–03 when he played 33 out of 34 of PSV's matches and scored 35 goals to help them win the title.

=== Chelsea ===
Kežman spent the 2004–05 season at Chelsea and scored seven goals in 40 appearances in all competitions. He was signed for the club on 13 July 2004 for £5.3 million by José Mourinho. He wore the number 9 shirt left vacant by Jimmy Floyd Hasselbaink's transfer to Middlesbrough.

He played 24 league games and scored four goals. The first goal came on 4 December 2004 in a 4–0 victory over Newcastle United at home, with an injury time penalty after coming on as a substitute in the 61st minute. He did not score again until 11 March 2005 in a 3–1 away victory over Norwich City, who were relegated at the end of the season. Eight days later he scored twice at home against another team that would be relegated, Crystal Palace, as Chelsea won 4–1. At the end of the season Chelsea won their first league title since 1954–55.

His first ever goal for Chelsea was in League Cup third round at home to West Ham United on 27 October 2004. It was the only goal of the game. He scored a goal in extra time (112th minute) of the 2005 League Cup Final against Liverpool. Chelsea won 3–2 after it finished 1–1 after 90 minutes.

Kežman scored a goal in the 3rd round of that season's FA Cup against Scunthorpe United as Chelsea won 3–1 at home. His attack down the right wing set up Chelsea's first goal in the 4-2 win against Barcelona in the Champions League Round of 16, in a "brilliant" play with the scorer Eiður Guðjohnsen.

In 2011, Kežman revealed to Sky Sports that his time at Chelsea was the best he has ever had in football, despite failing to make an impact for the club: "Chelsea was the best thing in my career. That was the climax of my career, for sure. Living and playing in London was something that I will never forget. I don't know if I made a mistake because I moved away so quickly. Maybe I do and maybe I don't regret it, but I always believe in my decisions. But the transfer to Chelsea made my dreams come true. That was the best thing that ever happened to me. Maybe I could achieve more and I could have been more successful at Stamford Bridge, but I don't regret anything."

=== Atlético Madrid ===
Kežman left Chelsea for Atlético Madrid of Spain's Primera División on 29 June 2005 for £5.3 million, the same price as he had joined Chelsea. He soon suffered a knee injury, which he did not recover from until after New Year's in 2006. Initially, the appointment of José Murcia as coach allegedly boosted Kežman's confidence, but by the end of his spell in Madrid, Kežman actually scored more goals (six) under Carlos Bianchi than with Murcia (with whom he scored a total of two goals in the remainder of the season). Atlético ended the season in 10th and were knocked out by Real Zaragoza in the Copa del Rey round of 16. Kežman scored a total of eight goals in 30 league matches, often in a strike partnership with Fernando Torres.

=== Fenerbahçe ===
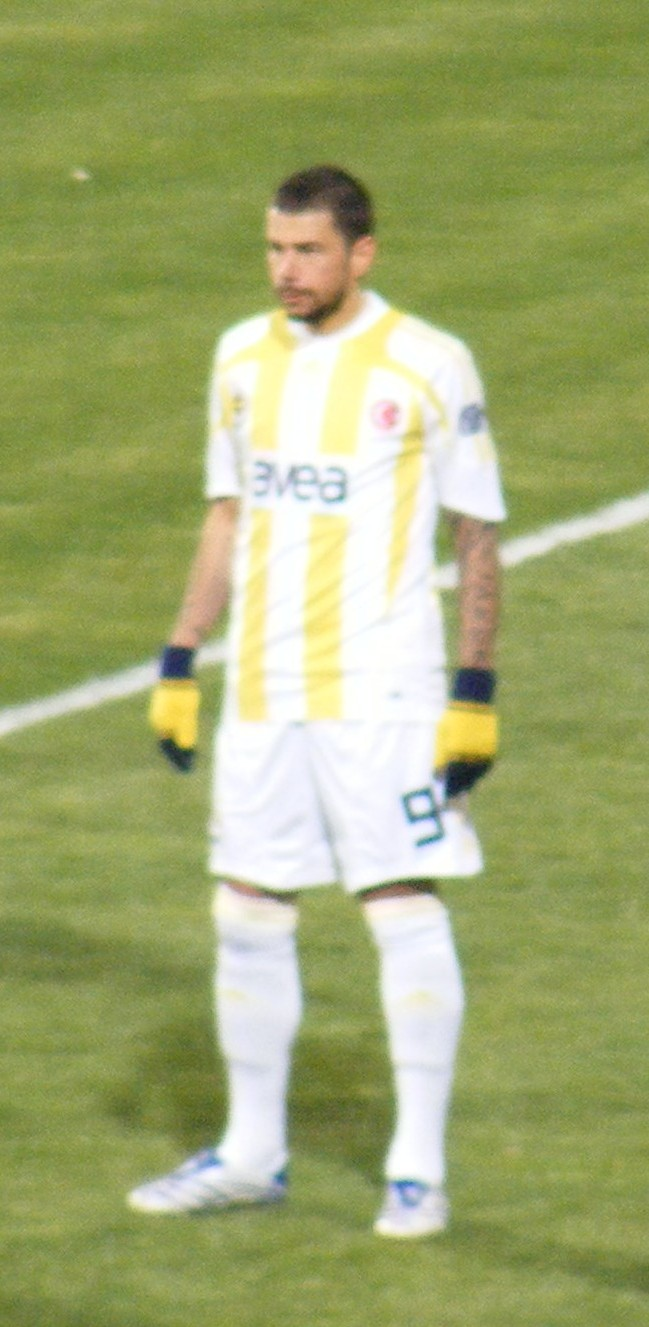
Kežman with Fenerbahçe in 2008

In the summer of 2006, Kežman was transferred to Fenerbahçe on a four-year contract. He played a central role in Fenerbahçe winning the 2006–07 Süper Lig in their centennial year. In the 2007–08 UEFA Champions League, he appeared in over half of Fenerbahçe's group stage matches against the likes of his former club PSV, Internazionale and CSKA Moscow. Ironically, he even played against Chelsea over both legs of the 2008 Champions League quarter-finals; the first of which he started and showed off with a close bicycle kick in a 2–1 win, while in the second leg he was subbed in during the dying minutes of his team's 2–0 loss at Stamford Bridge, where Fenerbahçe was eliminated in the longest-lasting Champions League campaign in the club's history. As a result of this and the preceding regular season, in which Kežman scored almost a goal every other game by statistical average, Fenerbahçe S.K. supporters revered him even in the years after he left Istanbul in his journeyman years.

=== Paris Saint-Germain ===
On 19 August 2008, Kežman signed for Paris Saint-Germain, a one-year loan with a buyout clause. He appeared in 21 league matches, mostly as substitute, and scored three goals.

On 30 August 2009, it was announced that Kežman would be joining Zenit Saint Petersburg from Paris Saint-Germain on a season-long loan, with a purchase option for an undisclosed fee. The next day, the transfer had been officially confirmed when the player passed medical examinations. He scored two goals for Zenit helping the team to finish 3rd in the Russian Premier League, but the Russian side decided not to retain his services, and he returned to Paris in January 2010.

On 3 November 2010, Kežman's contract with PSG was terminated by mutual consent.

=== South China ===
On 20 January 2011, it was announced that Kežman had signed to play for South China for the rest of the 2010–11 Hong Kong First Division League. Kežman made his debut on 29 January 2011 versus NT Realty Wofoo Tai Po which lost 1–0; he was substituted by Leung Chun Pong in the 64th minute.

On 13 February 2011, in the League Cup semi-final against league leader Kitchee, Kežman scored his first goal for the club in the 32nd minute and his second goal seven minutes before the end. South China beat Kitchee by 4–2 and entered the finals.

On 13 April 2011, in the 2011 AFC Cup group H match against Kingfisher East Bengal, Kežman scored his first AFC Cup goal in the 69th minute with a header, assisted by Au Yeung Yiu Chung. His goal helped South China gain victory and moved up to 3rd position in the group, but he also received a yellow card in the match, his second yellow card in the tournament and he missed the away game to East Bengal.

In May 2011, after his team failed to progress into the 2011 AFC Cup knockout stage, following 2–4 loss to Indonesian outfit Persipura Jayapura, Kežman said to the media that the AFC Cup is a strange competition and kind of stupid. He blamed the hot weather and long travel to go to Jayapura as one of the factors why his team could not progress further.

In the final match of the 2010–11 Hong Kong FA Cup, Kežman managed to take advantage of an opponent's defensive error and scored an outstanding goal in extra time to give his team a 2–1 win over NT Realty Wofoo Tai Po on 29 May 2011. The next day, Kežman finished his stint with South China after his four-month contract expired.

=== BATE ===
On 31 August 2011, Kežman joined Belarusian side BATE Borisov as a free agent until the end of the year. He was seen as a reinforcement for upcoming UEFA Champions League group stage games and as a potential replacement for seriously injured striker Vitali Rodionov. Ultimately, Kežman played six games in the Belarusian League and 5 games in the Champions League without scoring any goals. He parted ways with BATE after the last Champions League game against Barcelona.

=== Return to Hong Kong and retirement ===
In January 2012, Kežman returned to South China to play at the Asian Challenge Cup. He played his last professional match on 26 January 2012, missing the last penalty in the shoot-out series against Guangzhou R&F, in the third-place match. The club retired Kežman's number 38 after his last match.

== International career ==
Kežman marked his senior international debut for FR Yugoslavia during March 2000 with a goal against China in a friendly match as part of the preparations for UEFA Euro 2000. Head coach Vujadin Boškov included him in the final 23-man roster that he took to Belgium and the Netherlands. Despite being the fourth attacking option behind Predrag Mijatović, Savo Milošević and Darko Kovačević, 21-year-old Kežman got his chance as substitute late in the group match versus Norway. However, after being on the pitch for about 90 seconds, he was sent off following a rash tackle on Erik Mykland.

In February 2003, after embarrassing performances of the team during UEFA Euro 2004 qualifying, Kežman announced that he retired from the national jersey. However, Kežman returned to the team few months later, after Ilija Petković was appointed as the new coach.

Kežman led Serbia and Montenegro's scoring during the 2006 FIFA World Cup qualifications with five goals, including the only goal in the final game against Bosnia and Herzegovina which in turn allowed Serbia and Montenegro to qualify directly, having come first in their group. During the competition, he was sent off in a group match against Argentina by referee Roberto Rosetti.

After his sending off against Argentina at the 2006 FIFA World Cup, Kežman did not receive any call up for his country's national team.

During his six-year career in the national team, Kežman scored 17 goals in 49 appearances.

== Career statistics ==
=== Club ===
Appearances and goals by club, season and competition
Club	Season	League			National cup (Note: Includes FR Yugoslavia Cup, KNVB Cup, Copa del Rey, FA Cup, Turkish Cup, Coupe de France, Hong Kong FA Cup)		League cup (Note: Includes Football League Cup, Coupe de la Ligue, Hong Kong League Cup)		Continental		Other		Total	
Club	Season	Division	Apps	Goals	Apps	Goals	Apps	Goals	Apps	Goals	Apps	Goals	Apps	Goals
Radnički Pirot	1996–97	Second League of FR Yugoslavia	17	11	–		–		–		–		17	11
Loznica	1997–98	First League of FR Yugoslavia	13	5	1	0	–		–		–		14	5
Sartid Smederevo	1997–98	First League of FR Yugoslavia	14	4	0	0	–		–		–		14	4
Partizan	1998–99	First League of FR Yugoslavia	22	6	6	2	–		5 (Note: Appearances in UEFA Cup Winners' Cup)	0	–		33	8
Partizan	1999–2000	First League of FR Yugoslavia	32	27	2	2	–		7 (Note: Six appearances and six goals in UEFA Champions League, one appearance in UEFA Cup)	6	–		41	35
Partizan	Total		54	33	8	4	–		12	6	–		74	43
PSV	2000–01	Eredivisie	33	24	4	3	–		11 (Note: Six appearances and one goal in UEFA Champions League, five appearances and three goals in UEFA Cup)	4	1 (Note: Appearance in Johan Cruijff Shield)	0	49	31
PSV	2001–02	Eredivisie	27	15	2	1	–		11 (Note: Six appearances and two goals in UEFA Champions League, five appearances and one goal in UEFA Cup)	3	1	1	41	20
PSV	2002–03	Eredivisie	33	35	3	4	–		6 (Note: Appearances in UEFA Champions League)	0	1	1	43	40
PSV	2003–04	Eredivisie	29	31	1	0	–		12 (Note: Six appearances in UEFA Champions League, six appearances and six goals in UEFA Cup)	6	1	1	43	38
PSV	Total		122	105	10	8	–		40	13	4	3	176	129
Chelsea	2004–05	Premier League	25	4	3	1	4	2	9	0	–		41	7
Atlético Madrid	2005–06	La Liga	30	8	3	2	–		–		–		33	10
Fenerbahçe	2006–07	Süper Lig	24	9	2	0	–		7 (Note: Appearances in UEFA Cup)	2	–		33	11
Fenerbahçe	2007–08	Süper Lig	22	11	4	5	–		9	2	1 (Note: Appearance in Turkish Super Cup)	1	36	19
Fenerbahçe	Total		46	20	6	5	–		16	4	1	1	69	30
Paris Saint-Germain	2008–09	Ligue 1	21	3	2	2	4	0	8	3	–		35	8
Paris Saint-Germain	2009–10	Ligue 1	13	2	2	0	0	0	–		–		15	2
Paris Saint-Germain	2010–11	Ligue 1	1	0	0	0	0	0	1 (Note: Appearance in UEFA Europa League)	0	1 (Note: Appearance in Trophée des Champions)	0	3	0
Paris Saint-Germain	Total		35	5	4	2	4	0	9	3	1	0	53	10
Zenit (loan)	2009	Russian Premier League	10	2	0	0	–		–		–		10	2
South China	2010–11	Hong Kong First Division League	6	2	2	2	1	2	5 (Note: Appearances in AFC Cup)	1	2 (Note: Appearances in Hong Kong Senior Shield)	0	16	7
BATE Borisov	2011	Belarusian Premier League	6	0	0	0	–		5	0	–		11	0
South China	2011–12	Hong Kong First Division League	0	0	0	0	0	0	–		2	0	2	0
Career total			378	199	37	24	9	4	96	27	10	4	530	258

=== International ===
Appearances and goals by national team and year
National team	Year	Apps	Goals
FR Yugoslavia	2000	7	2
FR Yugoslavia	2001	9	5
FR Yugoslavia	2002	10	3
Serbia and Montenegro	2003	4	0
Serbia and Montenegro	2004	5	1
Serbia and Montenegro	2005	10	5
Serbia and Montenegro	2006	4	1
Total		49	17

Scores and results list Serbia and Montenegro's goal tally first, score column indicates score after each Kežman goal.

List of international goals scored by Mateja Kežman
No.	Date	Venue	Opponent	Score	Result	Competition
1	25 May 2000	Workers Stadium, Beijing, China	China	1–0	2–0	Friendly
2	16 August 2000	Windsor Park, Belfast, Northern Ireland	Northern Ireland	1–1	2–1	Friendly
3	6 June 2001	Svangaskarð, Toftir, Iceland	Faroe Islands	2–0	6–0	2002 FIFA World Cup qualifying
4	6 June 2001	Svangaskarð, Toftir, Iceland	Faroe Islands	5–0	6–0	2002 FIFA World Cup qualifying
5	6 June 2001	Svangaskarð, Toftir, Iceland	Faroe Islands	6–0	6–0	2002 FIFA World Cup qualifying
6	6 October 2001	Partizan Stadium, Belgrade, Serbia	Luxembourg	3–2	6–0	2002 FIFA World Cup qualifying
7	6 October 2001	Partizan Stadium, Belgrade, Serbia	Luxembourg	6–2	6–0	2002 FIFA World Cup qualifying
8	13 February 2002	Bank One Ballpark, Phoenix, United States	Mexico	1–0	2–1	Friendly
9	17 April 2002	Sartid Stadium, Smederevo, Serbia	Lithuania	2–1	4–1	Friendly
10	17 April 2002	Sartid Stadium, Smederevo, Serbia	Lithuania	3–1	4–1	Friendly
11	17 November 2004	King Baudouin Stadium, Brussels, Belgium	Belgium	2–0	2–0	2006 FIFA World Cup qualifying
12	17 August 2005	Valeriy Lobanovskyi Stadium, Kyiv, Ukraine	Ukraine	1–2	1–2	Valeriy Lobanovskyi Tournament
13	3 September 2005	Red Star Stadium, Belgrade, Serbia	Lithuania	1–0	2–0	2006 FIFA World Cup qualifying
14	7 September 2005	Vicente Calderón Stadium, Madrid, Spain	Spain	1–1	1–1	2006 FIFA World Cup qualifying
15	8 October 2005	LFF Stadium, Vilnius, Lithuania	Lithuania	1–0	2–0	2006 FIFA World Cup qualifying
16	12 October 2005	Red Star Stadium, Belgrade, Serbia	Bosnia and Herzegovina	1–0	1–0	2006 FIFA World Cup qualifying
17	1 March 2006	Stade Olympique de Radès, Radès, Tunisia	Tunisia	1–0	1–0	Friendly

== Honours ==
Partizan

- First League of FR Yugoslavia: 1998–99

PSV

- Eredivisie: 2000–01, 2002–03
- Johan Cruyff Shield: 2000, 2001, 2003

Chelsea

- Premier League: 2004–05
- Football League Cup: 2004–05

Fenerbahçe

- Süper Lig: 2006–07
- Turkish Super Cup: 2007

Paris Saint-Germain

- Coupe de France: 2009–10

South China

- Hong Kong FA Cup: 2010–11

BATE Borisov

- Belarusian Premier League: 2011

Individual

- First League of FR Yugoslavia top scorer: 1999–2000
- Eredivisie top scorer: 2000–01, 2002–03, 2003–04
- Dutch Footballer of the Year: 2002–03
- ESM Team of the Year: 2002–03

== See also ==
- 2017–2019 Belgian football fraud scandal

== Notes ==
1. Known as FR Yugoslavia until 4 February 2003.
