= 1999–2000 FK Partizan season =

Partizan
1999–2000 season
- President: Ivan Ćurković
- Head coach: Miodrag Ješić
- First League of FR Yugoslavia: Runners-up
- FR Yugoslavia Cup: Round of 16
- Champions League: Third qualifying round
- UEFA Cup: First round
- Top goalscorer: League: Mateja Kežman (27 goals); All: Mateja Kežman (35)

The 1999–2000 season was the 54th season in FK Partizan's existence. This article shows player statistics and matches that the club played during the 1999–2000 season.

Partizan finished as runner-ups in the league table.

== Competitions ==
=== First League of FR Yugoslavia ===
Pos	Team	Pld	W	D	L	GF	GA	GD	Pts	Qualification or relegation
1	Red Star Belgrade (C)	40	33	6	1	85	19	+66	105	Qualification for Champions League first qualifying round
2	Partizan	40	32	5	3	111	30	+81	101	Qualification for UEFA Cup qualifying round
3	Obilić	40	28	5	7	71	32	+39	89	Qualification for Intertoto Cup first round
4	Rad	40	17	9	14	56	46	+10	60	
5	Sutjeska	40	17	9	14	50	50	0	60	

Source: RSSSF.org
Rules for classification: 1) points; 2) goal difference; 3) number of goals scored.
Napredak Kruševac from Second League qualify for 2000–01 UEFA Cup as runner-up of 1999–2000 FR Yugoslavia Cup.
(C) Champions

=== UEFA Champions League ===
==== First qualifying round ====
14 July 1999 QR1 1st leg	Partizan (Federal Republic of Yugoslavia)	6–0	(Estonia) Flora Tallinn	Belgrade, FR Yugoslavia
19:30 (CET)	S. Ilić 12'; Peković 25', 71'; Ivić 36', 75'; Kežman 56'	Report		Stadium: Partizan Stadium; Attendance: 10,000; Referee: Philippe Leuba (Switzerland)

21 July 1999 QR1 2nd leg	Flora Tallinn (Estonia)	1–4 (1–10 agg.)	(Federal Republic of Yugoslavia) Partizan	Tallinn, Estonia
18:00 (CET)	Viikmäe 52'	Report	Kežman 10', 69'; S. Ilić 20'; Tomić 82'	Stadium: Kadriorg Stadium; Attendance: 400; Referee: Tom Henning Øvrebø (Norway)

==== Second qualifying round ====
28 July 1999 QR2 1st leg	Partizan (Federal Republic of Yugoslavia)	3–1	(Croatia) Rijeka	Belgrade, FR Yugoslavia
20:15 (CET)	Ilić 10'; Krstajić 22', 86'	Report	Sztipánovics 56'	Stadium: Partizan Stadium; Attendance: 21,746; Referee: Alain Hamer (Luxembourg)

4 August 1999 QR2 2nd leg	Rijeka (Croatia)	0–3 (1–6 agg.)	(Federal Republic of Yugoslavia) Partizan	Rijeka, Croatia
20:30 (CET)		Report	Kežman 7', 82'; Ivić 18'	Stadium: Stadion Kantrida; Attendance: 10,500; Referee: Günter Benkö (Austria)

==== Third qualifying round ====
11 August 1999 QR3 1st leg	Spartak Moscow (Russia)	2–0	(Federal Republic of Yugoslavia) Partizan	Moscow, Russia
18:00 (CET)	Shirko 37'; Tikhonov 73'	Report		Stadium: Luzhniki Stadium; Attendance: 42,000; Referee: Bernd Heynemann (Germany)

25 August 1999 QR3 2nd leg	Partizan (Federal Republic of Yugoslavia)	1–3 (1–5 agg.)	(Russia) Spartak Moscow	Belgrade, FR Yugoslavia
20:15 (CET)	Kežman 73'	Report	Shirko 19', 46'; Titov 85' (pen.)	Stadium: Partizan Stadium; Attendance: 18,216; Referee: Antonio López Nieto (Spain)

=== UEFA Cup ===
==== First round ====
14 September 1999 R1 1st leg	Partizan (Federal Republic of Yugoslavia)	1–3	(England) Leeds United	Heerenveen, Netherlands
	Tomić 20'		Bowyer 26', 82'; Radebe 39'	Stadium: Abe Lenstra Stadion; Attendance: 4,950; Referee: Herbert Fandel (Germany)

30 September 1999 R1 2nd leg	Leeds United (England)	1–0 (4–1 agg.)	(Federal Republic of Yugoslavia) Partizan	Leeds, England
	Huckerby 55'			Stadium: Elland Road; Attendance: 39,806; Referee: Fritz Stuchlik (Austria)

== See also ==
- List of FK Partizan seasons
