= André Karnebeek =

Dutch footballer

Personal information
- Date of birth: March 1, 1971 (age 55)
- Place of birth: Goor, Netherlands
- Height: 1.79 m (5 ft 10 1/2 in)
- Position: Defender

Senior career*
Years	Team	Apps	(Gls)
1989–2001	FC Twente	322	(5)
2002–2003	Dunfermline Athletic	7	(0)
2003–2005	De Graafschap	3	(0)
- * Club domestic league appearances and goals

André Karnebeek (born March 1, 1971) is a retired Dutch professional football player.

== Honours ==
Twente

- KNVB Cup: 2000–01
