= 2000–01 KNVB Cup =

Tournament details
- Country: Netherlands
- Teams: 86

Final positions
- Champions: Twente
- Runners-up: PSV

Tournament statistics
- Top goal scorer: Jan Vennegoor of Hesselink (8)

The 2000-01 KNVB Cup (at the time called Amstel Cup) was the 83rd edition of the Dutch national football annual knockout tournament for the KNVB Cup. 86 teams contested, beginning on 8 August 2000 and ending at the final on 24 May 2001.

Roda JC unsuccessfully defended its 2000 title in the Quarter-finals losing to PSV, 0–2. Twente successfully pursued its 2nd #Final KNVB Cup on 24 May 2001 in De Kuip, Rotterdam losing to PSV, 0–0 (penalty score, 3-4). 45,000 attended.

Twente contested the UEFA Cup.

== Teams ==
- All 18 participants of the Eredivisie 2000-01: six teams entered in the round of 16 of the knock-out stage; one team in the first round of the knock-out stage and the rest in the group stage
- All 18 participants of the Eerste Divisie 2000-01
- 48 teams from lower (amateur) leagues
- Two youth teams

== Group stage ==
The matches of the group stage were played between August 8 and September 13, 2000. 79 teams participated and 117 matches were played. 39 teams advanced to the next round.

Group 1
Team	Pts
1. AZ _{E}	9
2. VV Ter Leede _{A}	6
3. Telstar _{1}	3
4. AFC '34 _{A}	0

Group 2
Team	Pts
1. Excelsior _{1}	9
2. VV Noordwijk _{A}	6
3. VSV TONEGIDO _{A}	3
4. Excelsior Maassluis _{A}	0

Group 3
Team	Pts
1. Sparta _{E}	9
2. Rijnsburgse Boys _{A}	4
3. SVV Scheveningen _{A}	4
4. VV Nieuwenhoorn _{A}	0

Group 4
Team	Pts
1. ADO Den Haag _{1}	9
2. Dordrecht'90 _{1}	6
3. VV Katwijk _{A}	3
4. KBV _{A}	0

Group 5
Team	Pts
1. Young PSV	9
2. RBC _{E}	3
3. VV SHO _{A}	3
4. VV Kloetinge _{A}	3

Group 6
Team	Pts
1. Utrecht _{E}	9
2. ADO '20 _{A}	4
3. HFC Haarlem _{1}	3
4. IJsselmeervogels _{A}	0

Group 7
Team	Pts
1. Willem II _{E}	9
2. SV Huizen _{A}	6
3. VV Capelle _{A}	3
4. VV Nijenrodes _{A}	0

Group 8
Team	Pts
1. NAC Breda _{E}	9
2. VV Baronie _{A}	4
3. BVV Barendrecht _{A}	4
4. VV Spijkenisse _{A}	0

Group 9
Team	Pts
1. Den Bosch _{1}	9
2. SV TOP _{A}	4
3. OJC Rosmalen _{A}	3
4. ASWH _{A}	1

Group 10
Team	Pts
1. Helmond Sport _{1}	7
2. FC Eindhoven _{1}	5
3. Achilles Veen _{A}	4
4. UDI '19 _{A}	0

Group 11
Team	Pts
1. Cambuur _{1}	7
2. Volendam _{1}	6
3. Omniworld _{A}	4
4. SV Spakenburg _{A}	0

Group 12
Team	Pts
1. Young FC Utrecht	7
2. FC Zwolle _{1}	5
3. HVV Hollandia _{A}	4
4. VV WHC _{A}	0

Group 13
Team	Pts
1. Heracles _{1}	5
2. SV Urk _{A}	5
3. Be Quick '28 _{A}	5
4. Quick '20 _{A}	0

Group 14
Team	Pts
1. NEC _{E}	9
2. TOP Oss _{1}	6
3. De Treffers _{A}	3
4. GVVV _{A}	0

Group 15
Team	Pts
1. Fortuna Sittard _{E}	6
2. VV Gemert _{A}	3
3. VV Geldrop _{A}	0

Group 16
Team	Pts
1. Groningen _{E}	9
2. BV Veendam _{1}	6
3. VV Appingedam _{A}	3
4. ACV _{A}	0

Group 17
Team	Pts
1. Emmen _{1}	9
2. Achilles 1894 _{A}	6
3. VV Sneek _{A}	3
4. SC Genemuiden _{A}	0

Group 18
Team	Pts
1. Twente _{E}	7
2. Go Ahead Eagles _{1}	7
3. RKSV Babberich _{A}	3
4. VVOG _{A}	0

Group 19
Team	Pts
1. De Graafschap _{E}	9
2. USV Elinkwijk _{A}	4
3. VV Bennekom _{A}	3
4. HSC '21 _{A}	1

Group 20
Team	Pts
1. VVV-Venlo _{1}	9
2. MVV _{1}	6
3. SV Panningen _{A}	3
4. EHC _{A}	0

_{E} Eredivisie; _{1} Eerste Divisie; _{A} Amateur teams

== Knock-out Stage ==
=== First round ===
The matches of the first round were played on September 20 and 21, 2000. RKC Waalwijk entered the tournament here, during the group stage they were still active in the Intertoto Cup.

Home team	Result	Away team
Achilles '94	2–1	Young FC Utrecht
Utrecht	10–0	BV Veendam
Emmen	3–3 (p: 2-3)	TOP Oss
Go Ahead Eagles	1–5	Excelsior
Dordrecht '90	1–4	Young PSV
SV TOP	0–0 (p: 5-6)	VVV-Venlo
RKC Waalwijk _{E}	0–2	Heracles
Sparta	3–1	Volendam (on September 23)
De Graafschap	1–2	MVV (on October 4)
Den Bosch	3–2	RBC (on October 18)

Home team	Result	Away team
ADO '20	1–2	Cambuur
Willem II	1–2	FC Eindhoven
AZ	3–2	Rijnsburgse Boys
VV Noordwijk	1–2	NEC
SV Huizen	1–4	Groningen
Ter Leede	1–2 (gg)	Fortuna Sittard
VV Baronie	0–6	NAC Breda
SV Urk	2–3 (gg)	Helmond Sport
ADO Den Haag	1–3	FC Zwolle
Elinkwijk	2–3 (gg)	Twente

_{E} one Eredivisie entrant

=== Second round ===
The matches of the second round were played between October 19, 2000 and January 23, 2001.

Home team	Result	Away team
Fortuna Sittard	4–0	Groningen
FC Zwolle	3–1	NAC Breda
Helmond Sport	1–3	AZ
MVV	0–3	Utrecht
Young PSV	0–1	SBV Excelsior
Heracles	3–2	Cambuur
VVV-Venlo	3–2	TOP Oss
FC Eindhoven	0–4	Den Bosch
NEC	3–1	Sparta
Achilles '94	1–6	Twente

=== Round of 16 ===
The matches were played between January 24 and 27, 2001. The six Eredivisie teams that had been playing in European competitions after qualification last season, entered the tournament this round.

Home team	Result	Away team
PSV _{E}	4–1	Den Bosch
NEC	1–2	Feyenoord _{E}
Roda JC _{E}	2–0	Utrecht
Excelsior	1–3	AZ
Ajax _{E}	1–2 (gg)	Vitesse _{E}
Heracles	1–5	FC Zwolle
VVV-Venlo	0–1	Heerenveen _{E}
Fortuna Sittard	1–2	Twente

_{E} six Eredivisie entrants

=== Quarter-finals ===
The first three matches were played on 7 February 2001. The fourth was played on 14 March.

Home team	Result	Away team
FC Zwolle	3–4	Twente
Vitesse	2–1	AZ
Roda JC	0–2	PSV
Heerenveen	4–3	Feyenoord

=== Semi-finals ===
The matches of the semi-finals were played on April 11 and 12, 2001.

Home team	Result	Away team
Heerenveen	1–3	PSV
Vitesse	0–0 (p: 3-4)	Twente

=== Final ===
24 May 2001
18:00 CEST

PSV	0–0 (a.e.t.)	Twente
Penalties
Hofland (penalty scored) van Nistelrooy (penalty scored) van Bommel (penalty scored) de Jong (penalty missed); Waterreus (penalty missed); Kolkka (penalty missed)	3–4	(penalty missed) Vennegoor of Hesselink; (penalty scored) Booth; (penalty missed) Heubach; (penalty scored) Karnebeek; (penalty scored) Polak; (penalty scored) Hulshoff

De Kuip, Rotterdam
Attendance: 45,000
Referee: Herman van Dijk

Twente would participate in the UEFA Cup.
