= Theo Lucius =

Dutch footballer

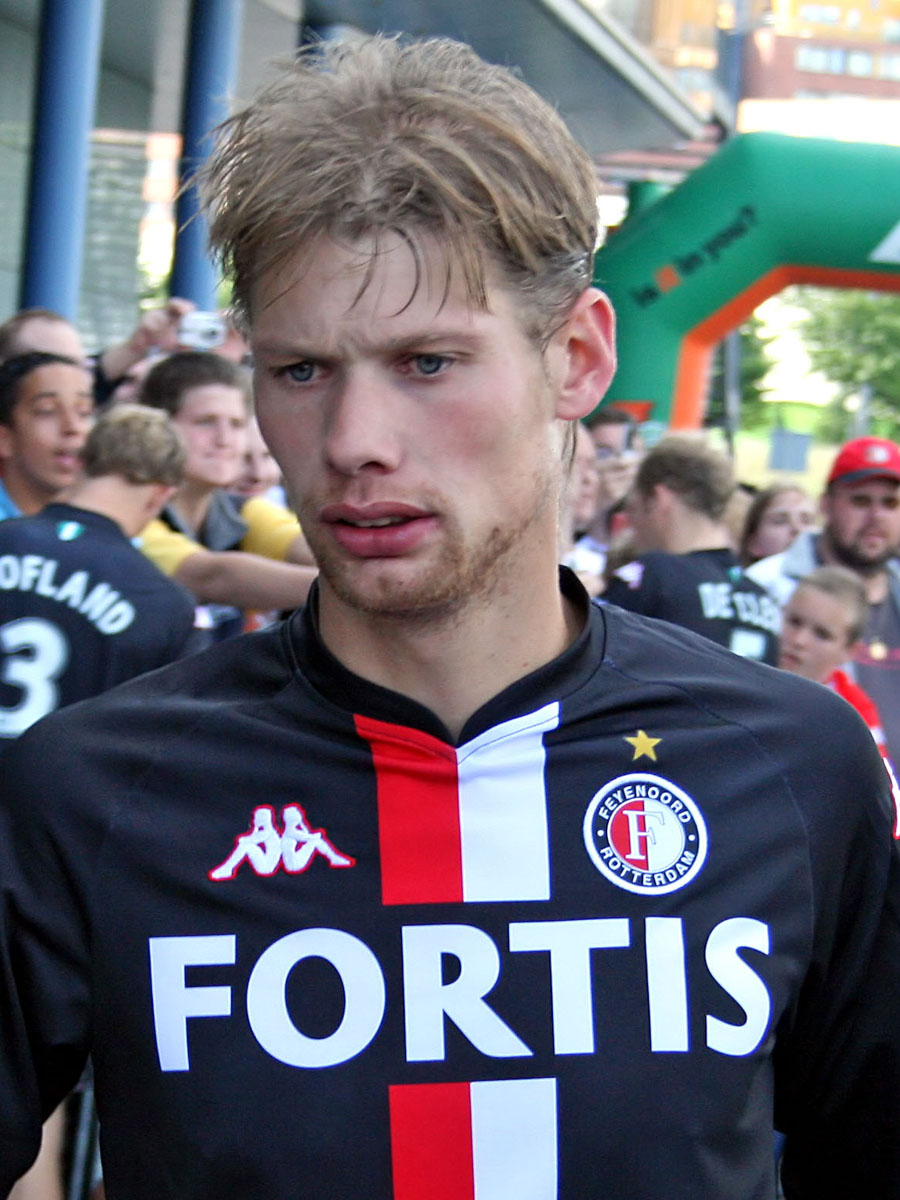
- Lucius as a Feyenoord player in 2007

Personal information
- Full name: Theodorus Martinus Maria Lucius
- Date of birth: 19 December 1976 (age 49)
- Place of birth: Veghel, Netherlands
- Height: 1.82 m (6 ft 0 in)
- Positions: Defender; defensive midfielder

Youth career
- 1982–1990: VV Heeswijk
- 1990–1996: Den Bosch

Senior career*
Years	Team	Apps	(Gls)
1996–1998	Den Bosch	67	(8)
1998–2006	PSV	144	(8)
1999–2000	→ Utrecht (loan)	32	(3)
2006–2009	Feyenoord	74	(6)
2010	Groningen	4	(0)
2010–2011	Den Bosch	24	(0)
2011–2012	FC Eindhoven	25	(3)
2012	RKC Waalwijk	0	(0)
2013	FC Eindhoven	12	(0)
2013–2014	Kozakken Boys	16	(0)
Total		398	(28)

International career
2005	Netherlands	3	(0)
- * Club domestic league appearances and goals

Theodorus Martinus Maria "Theo" Lucius (born 19 December 1976) is a Dutch former professional footballer. He could operate as a right back or a central defender, and also as a defensive midfielder.

He spent most of his 16-year professional career with PSV, winning nine major titles with the club, notably four Eredivisie championships, and appearing in 254 games in the competition overall (17 goals).

== Club career ==
=== Den Bosch ===
Lucius was born in Veghel, North Brabant. When he was five years old he started his football career at amateurs VV Heeswijk, joining BVV Den Bosch eight years later and being reconverted from a striker to a midfielder; since the age of 15, he also worked as a carpenter, and made formwork for a concrete factory.

In the 1996–97 season, newly appointed manager Kees Zwamborn awarded Lucius with his senior official debut, an Eerste Divisie match away against BV Veendam on 20 August 1996 (0–1 loss), and the player was an undisputed starter in his two years with the 's-Hertogenbosch side, as it consecutively fell short in the promotion playoffs.

=== PSV ===
In the 1998 off-season, after reported interest from FC Utrecht, AZ and PSV Eindhoven, Lucius chose the latter, managed by Bobby Robson. He played 25 games in his first season, winning the Dutch Supercup.

When Erik Gerets took over from the English, Lucius was sent on loan to Utrecht, returning to the Philips side for the 2000–01 campaign and continuing to be regularly used under both the Belgian and his successor, Guus Hiddink, as the club won four Eredivisie championships, also reaching the semifinals in the 2004–05 edition of the UEFA Champions League, being eliminated by A.C. Milan in the dying seconds of the game (3–1 home win, after a 0–2 loss in the first leg); in his last two years, the player was used more as a right back.

=== Feyenoord and later years ===
Lucius moved to Feyenoord for 2006–07, scoring a career-best five goals in 27 games as the De Kuip side finished in seventh position. He won the following season's domestic cup, against Roda JC (2–0).

Following the return of Giovanni van Bronckhorst, Lucius was stripped of his captain armband. In June 2009, his contract with the Rotterdam club ended, and Lucius spent the following months training with former club Den Bosch in view of a permanent move, supposedly with an amateur contract; eventually, nothing came of it and he joined FC Groningen for one season.

In July 2010, aged nearly 34, Lucius finally returned to Den Bosch, again in the second division. At the end of the campaign, he moved to another team in the category, FC Eindhoven. After one year he joined RKC Waalwijk on an amateur basis, but left after only one month due to lack of playing time, rejoining his previous club in the following transfer window.

== International career ==
On 4 June 2005, Lucius made his debut with the Netherlands, led by Marco van Basten, in a 2–0 home win against Romania for the 2006 FIFA World Cup qualifiers. Four days later, in the same competition – again as a starting right back – he won the second of his three caps, in a 4–0 win over Finland.

== Personal life ==
In January 2004, Lucius made headlines for selling illegal fireworks to a man from Breda in December of the previous year. When using the device, the man was badly injured and lost his eye. As a result, Lucius spent a few days in jail and was sentenced to community service, first to 80 hours, which was raised in 2006 to 240 hours.

He was also a poker player, with a rather negative record.

After his active career, Lucius became co-owner of a café in his home town of Heeswijk-Dinther.

== Career statistics ==
Appearances and goals by club, season and competition
Club	Season	League			KNVB Cup		Continental		Other		Total	
Club	Season	Division	Apps	Goals	Apps	Goals	Apps	Goals	Apps	Goals	Apps	Goals
Den Bosch	1996–97	Eerste Divisie	34	4			–		–		34	4
Den Bosch	1997–98	Eerste Divisie	33	4			–		–		33	4
Den Bosch	Total		67	8			0	0	0	0	67	8
PSV	1998–99	Eredivisie	25	1			6	0	1 (Note: Includes appearance in Johan Cruyff Shield)	0	32	1
PSV	2000–01	Eredivisie	17	1			9	1	0	0	26	2
PSV	2001–02	Eredivisie	23	1			10	0	1	0	34	1
PSV	2002–03	Eredivisie	14	0			4	0	0	0	18	0
PSV	2003–04	Eredivisie	22	4			6	2	0	0	28	6
PSV	2004–05	Eredivisie	22	1	1	0	5	0	–		28	1
PSV	2005–06	Eredivisie	21	0	0	0	5	0	1	0	27	0
PSV	Total		144	8	1	0	45	3	3	0	193	11
Utrecht (loan)	1999–2000	Eredivisie	32	3			0	0	–		32	3
Feyenoord	2006–07	Eredivisie	27	5	0	0	4	1	2 (Note: Includes appearances in Eredivisie play-offs for UEFA Cup)	0	33	6
Feyenoord	2007–08	Eredivisie	29	1	5	0	–		–		34	1
Feyenoord	2008–09	Eredivisie	18	0	1	0	3	0	0	0	22	0
Feyenoord	Total		74	6	6	0	7	1	2	0	89	7
Groningen	2009–10	Eredivisie	4	0	0	0	–		1 (Note: Includes appearance in Eredivisie play-offs for UEFA Europa League)	0	5	0
Den Bosch	2010–11	Eerste Divisie	24	0	1	0	–		1 (Note: Includes appearance in Eredivisie relegation play-offs)	0	26	0
FC Eindhoven	2011–12	Eerste Divisie	25	3	2	0	–		1	0	28	3
RKC Waalwijk	2012–13	Eredivisie	0	0	0	0	–		–		0	0
FC Eindhoven	2012–13	Eerste Divisie	12	0	0	0	–		–		12	0
Kozakken Boys	2013–14	Topklasse	16	0	3	0	–		–		19	0
Career total			398	28	13	0	52	4	8	0	471	32

== Honours ==
PSV

- Eredivisie: 2000–01, 2002–03, 2004–05, 2005–06
- KNVB Cup: 2004–05; Runner-up 2000–01, 2005–06
- Johan Cruyff Shield: 1998, 2000, 2001, 2003; Runner-up 2002, 2005

Feyenoord

- KNVB Cup: 2007–08
- Johan Cruijff Shield: Runner-up 2008
