= Wilfred Bouma =

Dutch footballer (born 1978)

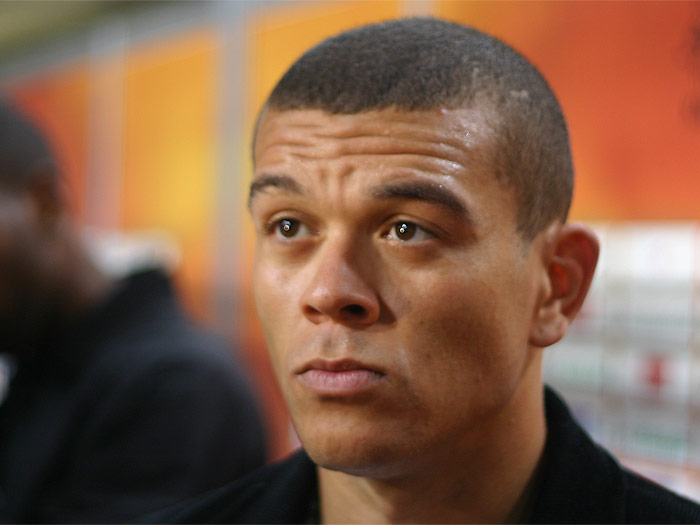

Personal information
- Full name: Wilfred Bouma
- Date of birth: 15 June 1978 (age 48)
- Place of birth: Helmond, Netherlands
- Height: 1.79 m (5 ft 10 in)
- Positions: Left back; centre back

Youth career
- –1994: SV Rood-Wit '62
- 1994: PSV

Senior career*
Years	Team	Apps	(Gls)
1994–2005	PSV	168	(19)
1996–1998	→ MVV (loan)	51	(13)
1998–1999	→ Fortuna Sittard (loan)	33	(5)
2005–2010	Aston Villa	83	(1)
2010–2013	PSV	76	(4)
Total		411	(42)

International career
1992	Netherlands U15	1	(0)
1992–1993	Netherlands U16	4	(0)
1993–1994	Netherlands U17	7	(0)
1994	Netherlands U18	2	(0)
1995–1996	Netherlands U19	9	(3)
1996–2000	Netherlands U21	16	(4)
2000–2012	Netherlands	37	(2)
Medal record
Men's football
Representing Netherlands
UEFA European Championship
Bronze medal – third place	2004 Portugal
- * Club domestic league appearances and goals

Wilfred Bouma (Dutch pronunciation: [ˈʋɪlfrəd ˈbʌumaː]; (Note: Wilfred in isolation: [ˈʋɪlfrət].) born 15 June 1978) is a Dutch former professional footballer who played most notably for PSV Eindhoven, Aston Villa and the Netherlands national team.

== Club career ==
=== Early career ===
Born in Helmond, North Brabant, Bouma started his career at amateur club SV Rood-Wit '62 before joining PSV on a youth contract in 1994. The PSV head coach at the time, Aad de Mos handed him his professional debut against Willem II on 26 October 1994 which his team lost 2–1. After not featuring for a long time, he was loaned out to MVV in 1996 and played in the Eerste Divisie where he scored seven goals in 18 games. The following season, he scored sixteen goals in 33 games after helping his team back into the Eredivisie. After impressing at Fortuna Sittard in 1998–99, he was drafted back into the PSV squad the following season.

=== PSV ===
At PSV, he played as a left winger and as forward because of his quick pace and direct passing, teaming up with Arnold Bruggink and at times, with Ruud van Nistelrooy.

When Arthur Numan departed to Rangers at the end of the 1999–00 season, Bouma was moved to left-back where he had to compete with Danish international Jan Heintze.

With the 2002 FIFA World Cup qualifiers entering its crucial stages, Bouma was handed his international debut for the Netherlands national team against the Republic of Ireland on 2 September 2000. In the Euro 2004 tournament in Portugal, he was chosen by Dick Advocaat to play as a central defender and he has also retained that spot while playing for PSV under Guus Hiddink in the 2004–05 season.

=== Aston Villa ===
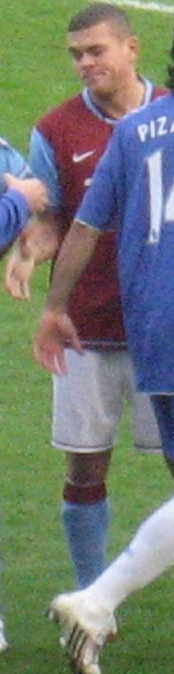
Bouma before an Aston Villa game in 2007

Just before the close of the international transfer window, Bouma signed for Aston Villa on 30 August 2005 for £3.5 million. He struggled to establish himself during the 2005–06 campaign at Villa Park, as his debut season was heavily tarnished with injuries. However, when Martin O'Neill replaced boss David O'Leary, Bouma – after recovering from a hamstring injury – replaced stand-in left-back Gareth Barry.

Under O'Neill, Bouma begun to flourish during the 2006–07 season – he established himself as first choice left back and went on to total 28 appearances in the claret and blue shirt. This turn in form also attributed to Bouma reclaiming his place in the Netherlands national team, playing in the friendly against Russia in February 2007, the tour of Asia in June 2007 and the following UEFA Euro 2008 qualifying fixtures.

On 9 February 2008, Bouma – who was in the process of making his 76th appearance in claret and blue – netted his only goal for the club in the 48th minute of the match against Newcastle United. The deflected goal levelled the game at 1–1, before a hat-trick by teammate John Carew, wrapped up a 4–1 victory.

Upon returning from international duty for the Netherlands at Euro 2008, Bouma participated in both legs of Aston Villa's Intertoto Cup third round tie against Odense, however the second leg at Villa Park on 26 July 2008 was marred by a serious ankle injury to the full-back. Bouma caught his studs on the turf as he attempted to challenge opposition forward Baye Djiby Fall. Initially, the injury looked like a break, however reports later confirmed that Bouma had suffered a dislocation, an injury which looked set to keep him out until October. His recovery however took much longer. Bouma's increasing importance to the Villa cause, as well as his 'cult-hero status' was noted as he was carried off early in the tie whilst being accompanied by a 30,000 strong chant of support by the Villa faithful.

On 9 September 2008, Bouma signed a new two-year deal at Villa Park with the option of a third year.

In January 2009, it was announced that Bouma, along with other long-term absentee John Carew had returned to full training. He was scheduled to return on 16 February for the reserves but he pulled out at the last minute because he "felt sore". On 2 March 2009, Bouma finally played 90 minutes in a 4–3 win in a reserve match against Chelsea. However, he suffered a setback on his road to recovery in April after learning bone fragments had broken away from his ankle, and underwent surgery soon after.

On 16 September 2009, after being out of action for fourteen months, it was announced that Bouma had resumed full training with the club. Yet to make a return to Villa's first team, Bouma suffered another setback and was again out of action with a stubbed toe injury.

On 29 January 2010, Aston Villa announced that Bouma had finally returned to full training following eighteen months of absence through injury. However, while Bouma played a full ninety minutes for the Aston Villa reserves in February 2010, he never made a return to the first team. On 6 May 2010, Aston Villa confirmed that Bouma was set to leave the club at the end of the 2009–2010 season. Bouma said his goodbyes to the Villa faithful during half-time of the home defeat to Blackburn in their final league game, later stating that he intended to address the fans but "just couldn't do it" after becoming too emotional.

=== Return to PSV ===
On 26 June 2010, it was revealed that Bouma's former club PSV Eindhoven had offered him a trial at the club in an attempt to revive his career and he joined up with the rest of the PSV squad for pre-season training. Bouma later sealed his return on 30 August 2010, signing a two-year contract with the club. Bouma scored his first goal since his return to the Netherlands in a 3–0 home win against VVV-Venlo. Bouma played 66 minutes during a record Eredivisie 10–0 victory over Feyenoord.

Bouma continued his good goal scoring form when he netted his third goal in only 16 league games during the 3-0 away win against VVV-Venlo. On 24 February 2011, Bouma was handed the captain's armband for the final five minutes of the UEFA Europa League match against Lille that PSV went on to win 3–1 on the day and 5–3 on aggregate.

== International career ==
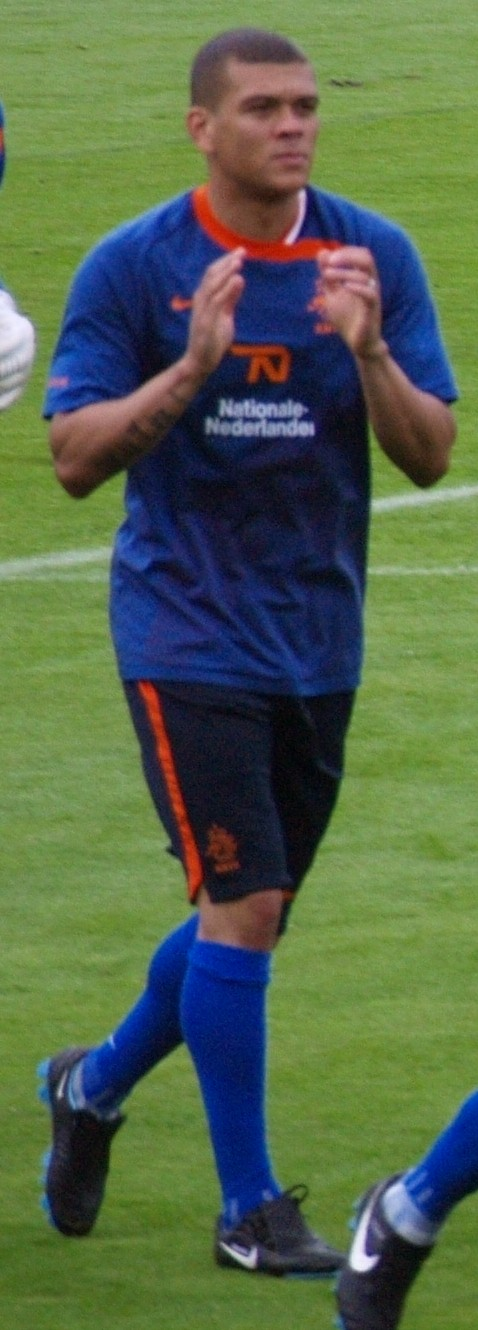
Bouma training with the Netherlands.

Bouma was a member of the Dutch squad at the 1995 FIFA World Youth Championship. Wilfred Bouma played for the Netherlands 37 times, scoring twice. Bouma made his debut on 2 September 2000, in the 2–2 draw with the Republic of Ireland. Several steady appearances followed in the coming years, including four appearances at UEFA Euro 2004, whilst playing as a centre-back.

Bouma was also included in the Dutch squad for UEFA Euro 2008, and he made two appearances, coming on as a 78th-minute substitute against France and playing the full 90 minutes against Romania. After a four year absence, Bouma was recalled to the national team shortly before UEFA Euro 2012 and would make the final squad although did not play in the tournament. His final appearance was against Slovakia in a friendly prior to the tournament. Bouma's only two goals at international level came within four months of each other, as the defender netted in the 3–2 defeat to Czech Republic in the group stage of Euro 2004. He then went on to net the opener against Macedonia in October of the same year, in a match which ended 2–2.

== Coaching career ==
Bouma did an internship in 2015 as a youth coach at PSV. Since 2019, he has been an assistant coach at Jong PSV, under head coach Peter Uneken.

== Personal life ==
Bouma was born in the Netherlands and is of Surinamese and Indonesian descent. He lives in Eindhoven.

== Career statistics ==
=== Club ===
Appearances and goals by club, season and competition
Club	Season	League			National cup (Note: Includes KNVB Cup, FA Cup.)		League cup (Note: Includes Football League Cup.)		Continental		Total	
Club	Season	Division	Apps	Goals	Apps	Goals	Apps	Goals	Apps	Goals	Apps	Goals
PSV	1994–95	Eredivisie	1	0	–		–		–		1	0
PSV	1995–96	Eredivisie	4	0	–		–		–		4	0
PSV	1996–97	Eredivisie	1	0	–		–		–		1	0
PSV	1999–2000	Eredivisie	27	9	–		–		3	0	30	9
PSV	2000–01	Eredivisie	20	0	1	0	–		7	1	28	1
PSV	2001–02	Eredivisie	27	3	–		–		10	0	37	3
PSV	2002–03	Eredivisie	27	1	–		–		6	0	33	1
PSV	2003–04	Eredivisie	32	5	–		–		12	2	44	7
PSV	2004–05	Eredivisie	26	1	1	0	–		14	0	41	1
PSV	2005–06	Eredivisie	3	0	–		–		–		3	0
PSV	Total		168	19	2	0	0	0	52	3	222	22
MVV (loan)	1996–97	Eerste Divisie	18	7	–		–		–		18	7
MVV (loan)	1997–98	Eredivisie	33	6	–		–		–		33	6
MVV (loan)	Total		51	13	0	0	0	0	0	0	51	13
Fortuna Sittard (loan)	1998–99	Eredivisie	33	5	–		–		–		33	5
Aston Villa	2005–06	Premier League	20	0	1	0	–		–		21	0
Aston Villa	2006–07	Premier League	25	0	1	0	2	0	–		28	0
Aston Villa	2007–08	Premier League	38	1	1	0	–		–		39	1
Aston Villa	2008–09	Premier League	–		–		–		2	0	2	0
Aston Villa	2009–10	Premier League	–		–		–		–		0	0
Aston Villa	Total		83	1	3	0	2	0	2	0	90	1
PSV	2010–11	Eredivisie	26	3	–		–		10	1	36	4
PSV	2011–12	Eredivisie	27	1	–		–		8	1	35	2
PSV	2012–13	Eredivisie	23	0	–		–		8	0	31	0
PSV	Total		76	4	0	0	0	0	26	2	102	6
Career total			411	42	5	0	2	0	80	5	498	47

=== International ===
Scores and results list the Netherlands' goal tally first, score column indicates score after each Bouma goal.

List of international goals scored by Wilfred Bouma
No.	Date	Venue	Opponent	Score	Result	Competition
1	19 June 2004	Estádio Municipal, Aveiro, Portugal	Czech Republic	1–0	2–3	Euro 2004
2	10 October 2004	City Stadium, Skopje, Macedonia	Macedonia	0–1	2–2	2006 World Cup qualification

== Honours ==
PSV Eindhoven

- Eredivisie: 1999–00, 2000–01, 2002–03, 2004–05
- KNVB Cup: 1996, 2005, 2012
- Johan Cruijff-schaal: 2000, 2001, 2003, 2012
