= Adil Ramzi =

Moroccan footballer and manager (born 1977)

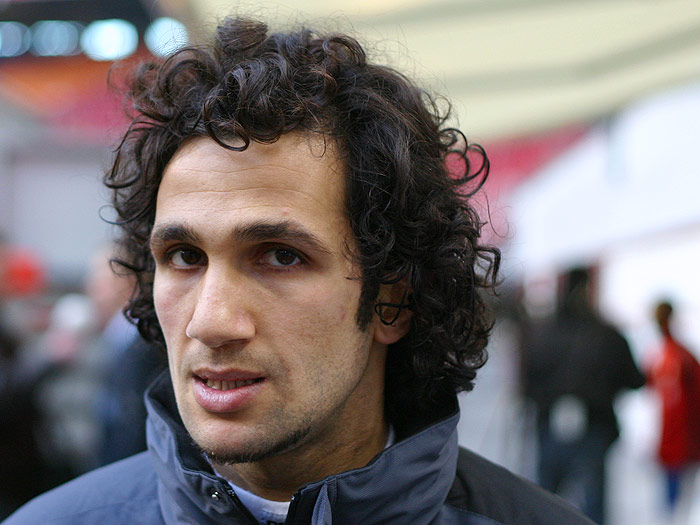
- Ramzi in 2006

Personal information
- Date of birth: 14 July 1977 (age 49)
- Place of birth: Marrakesh, Morocco
- Height: 1.79 m (5 ft 10 in)
- Position: Midfielder

Senior career*
Years	Team	Apps	(Gls)
1995–1997	Kawkab Marrakech	30	(13)
1997	Udinese	0	(0)
1998–2000	Willem II	52	(18)
2000–2004	PSV	49	(6)
2002–2003	→ Córdoba (loan)	20	(2)
2003–2004	→ Twente (loan)	32	(8)
2004–2006	AZ	32	(2)
2006	→ Utrecht (loan)	15	(7)
2006–2007	Roda JC	31	(9)
2007–2010	Al-Wakrah	69	(47)
2010–2011	Umm Salal	13	(4)
2011–2013	Roda JC	45	(3)
Total		388	(119)

International career
1997–1998	Morocco U20	8	(1)
1998–	Morocco U23	2	(0)
1998–2007	Morocco	34	(4)

Managerial career
- 2022–2023: Jong PSV
- 2023–2024: Wydad
- 2024–2026: Netherlands U18
- 2026–: Netherlands (assistant)
Medal record
Representing Morocco
U-20 Africa Cup of Nations
Winner	1997 Morocco
- * Club domestic league appearances and goals

Adil Ramzi (Arabic: عادل رمزي; born 14 July 1977) is a Moroccan professional football coach and former player, He is currently working as an assistant coach of the Netherlands national football team.

== International career ==
Ramzi was a member of the Morocco national team, playing 34 international matches and scoring four goals. He also represented Morocco in the 1997 FIFA World Youth Championship and at many African championships.

== Coaching career ==
In December 2019, after four years of working with the youth setup, Ramzi was moved to the first team coaching staff of PSV.

== Honours ==
=== Player ===
Kawkab Marrakech

- CAF Cup: 1996

PSV

- Eredivisie: 2000–01, 2002–03
- Johan Cruyff Shield: 2000, 2001

Morocco U20

- U-20 Africa Cup of Nations: 1997

Individual

- Twente Player of the Year: 2003–04
- Eredivisie Top Assist Provider: 2003–04

=== Manager ===
Jong PSV

- Premier League International Cup: 2022–23

Wydad

- African Football League runner-up: 2023
