= Jan Heintze =

Danish footballer (born 1963)

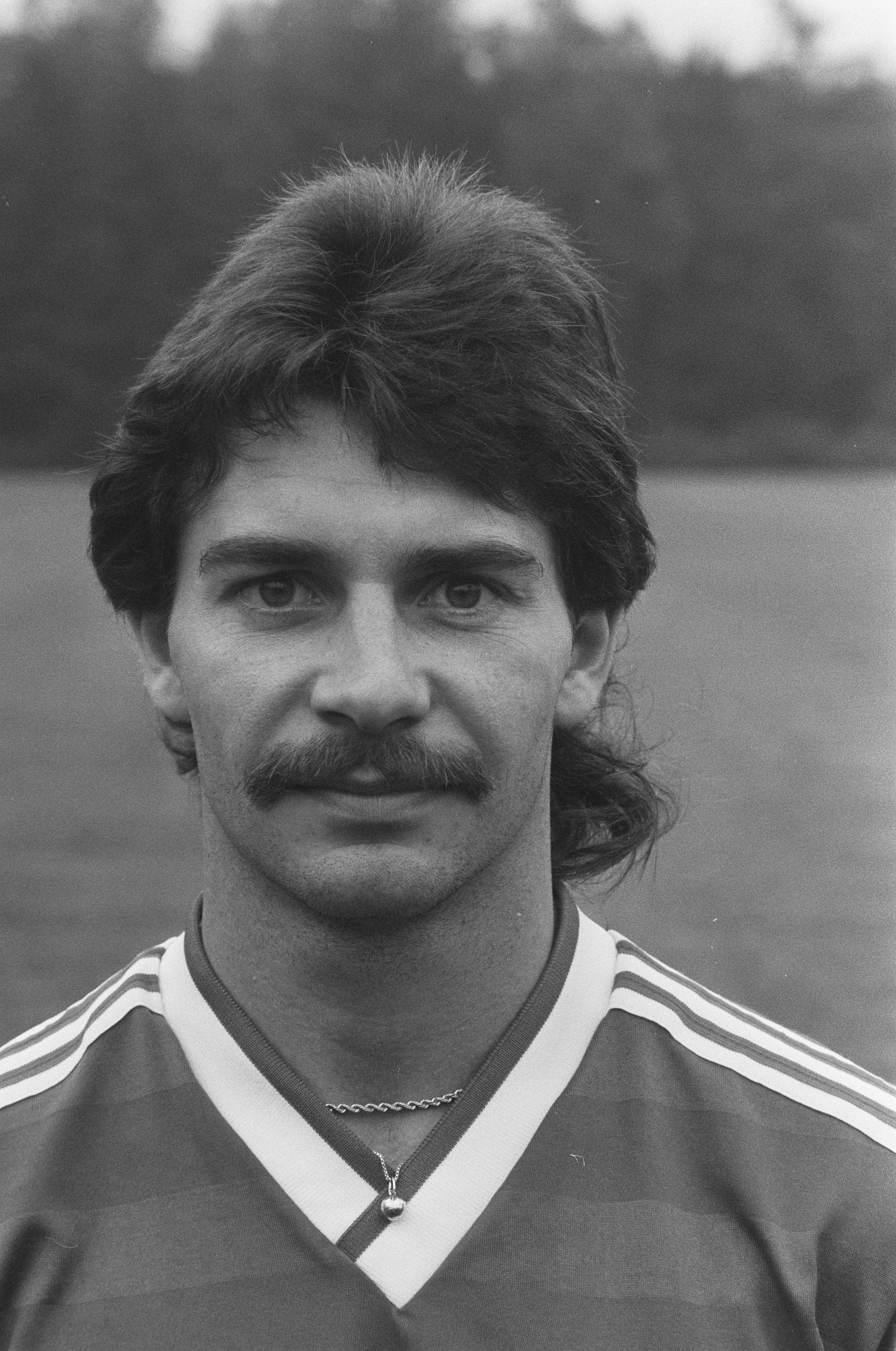
- Heintze in 1987

Personal information
- Full name: Jan Heintze Larsen
- Date of birth: 17 August 1963 (age 63)
- Place of birth: Tårnby, Denmark
- Height: 1.70 m (5 ft 7 in)
- Position: Left-back

Youth career
- 1970–1980: Tårnby Boldklub
- 1980: Københavns Boldklub

Senior career*
Years	Team	Apps	(Gls)
1981–1982	Kastrup Boldklub	29	(4)
1982–1994	PSV Eindhoven	313	(6)
1994–1996	Bayer Uerdingen	53	(3)
1996–1999	Bayer Leverkusen	87	(5)
1999–2003	PSV Eindhoven	82	(1)
Total		564	(19)

International career
1987–2002	Denmark	86	(4)
- * Club domestic league appearances and goals

Jan Heintze (Danish pronunciation: [ˈjan ˈhɑjnt.sə]; born 17 August 1963) is a Danish former professional footballer who played as a left-sided defensive midfielder and defender. He ended his career in the Netherlands with PSV Eindhoven, where he was a part of the PSV team which won the 1988 European Cup. He played 86 matches for the Denmark national team in the course of 15 years, playing four international tournaments with the team, which he captained in his last two years before he retired in 2003.

== Club career ==
Born in Tårnby, he started playing for his hometown club Tårnby Boldklub. He had a short spell in the youth team of Københavns boldklub (KB) alongside future national team player Michael Laudrup, but Heintze quickly moved on to play for the senior side of Kastrup Boldklub in January 1981, then in the top-flight Danish 1st Division. However, the team was relegated, and though he had offers from foreign clubs, the 17-year-old Heintze stayed at Kastrup, on orders of his mother.

He was bought by PSV in 1982 as a left winger, in which position he had been most successful in his first years at Kastrup Boldklub. Once at PSV, he was re-schooled as a defender, using his aggressiveness to charge up and down the sideline, and following a first season of few matches, he commanded the left back position in his second year, and made it his own. He won six Dutch Eredivisie league titles and a European Cup with the club, which at times counted three other Danes, Frank Arnesen, Søren Lerby and Ivan Nielsen, before the club hired coach Aad de Mos, who did not want him in the team. Heintze went to Germany to play for Bundesliga relegation battlers Bayer Uerdingen in 1994, and when the team was relegated in 1996, he went on to Bayer Leverkusen under coach Christoph Daum, with whom he finished in the Bundesliga top-three for three years in a row. Heintze returned to finish his career at PSV in 1999, with his old team mate Eric Gerets the head coach. Approaching 40, Heintze was looking to help the young Wilfred Bouma into the team as new left back, while using his experience to provide stability in the defense. He won another three Dutch championship titles before retiring in 2003.

== International career ==
Heintze made his Denmark debut on 29 April 1987 in a Euro 1988 qualifying match, a 1–0 win over Finland, and he played all three matches at the final Euro 1988 tournament, though Denmark lost them all. At the final qualification match for the Euro 1992 against Yugoslavia on 1 May 1991, Heintze's then club, PSV, wanted him to stay home to play an important match for PSV, but he decided to travel with the Denmark team. Once at the Denmark camp, Heintze learned that national coach Richard Møller Nielsen did not intend to start with him in the game, and after consulting PSV, who still wanted him to play, Heintze decided to go back to the Netherlands, without the knowledge of Møller Nielsen. Back in Eindhoven, Heintze found out he wasn't eligible for the PSV match since he had been written off to play for Denmark. Heintze would see the PSV game from the sideline, and as a punishment for leaving the national team, he received a one-year ban from the national team by Møller Nielsen. As the ban expired before the Euro 1992, Heintze was once more called up, but an injury kept him from re-entering the team. Thus, he missed Denmark's later victory in Euro 1992, following Yugoslavia's exclusion from the tournament due to the Yugoslav wars. He played a further four matches under Møller Nielsen, before his national team career went on hiatus.

When Denmark hired new coach Bo Johansson in 1996, Heintze was once more called up for Denmark, and he played in the 1998 FIFA World Cup and Euro 2000 tournaments. Following the international retirement of Peter Schmeichel in April 2001, Heintze captained his country at the 2002 FIFA World Cup, under new Denmark coach Morten Olsen. At the 2002 World Cup in South Korea and Japan, Heintze was suffering in the heat, and after being substituted after the second match of the tournament, Heintze, who was the oldest players at the World Cup, watched the last two games from the bench, before Denmark was eliminated. He ended his national career following the competition, 38 years of age, though he continued to play another season for PSV.

In a Euro 2000 qualifying match against Belarus on 5 June 1999 he scored a memorable goal, directly from a corner kick.

== Personal life ==
Jan Heintze lives in the Netherlands, in Nuenen.

== Honours ==
PSV Eindhoven

- Eredivisie (9): 1985–86, 1986–87, 1987–88, 1988–89, 1990–91, 1991–92, 1999–2000, 2000–01, 2002–03
- KNVB Cup: 1987–88, 1988–89, 1989–90
- Johan Cruijff-schaal: 1992, 2000, 2001
- European Cup: 1987–88

== Biography ==
- Jan Heintze, "Tyve år på toppen" (Twenty years at the top), Denmark, 2002, ISBN 87-7714-459-7

Sporting positions
Preceded by Peter Schmeichel	Denmark captain 2001–2002	Succeeded by René Henriksen
