= Kasper Bøgelund =

Danish footballer (born 1980)

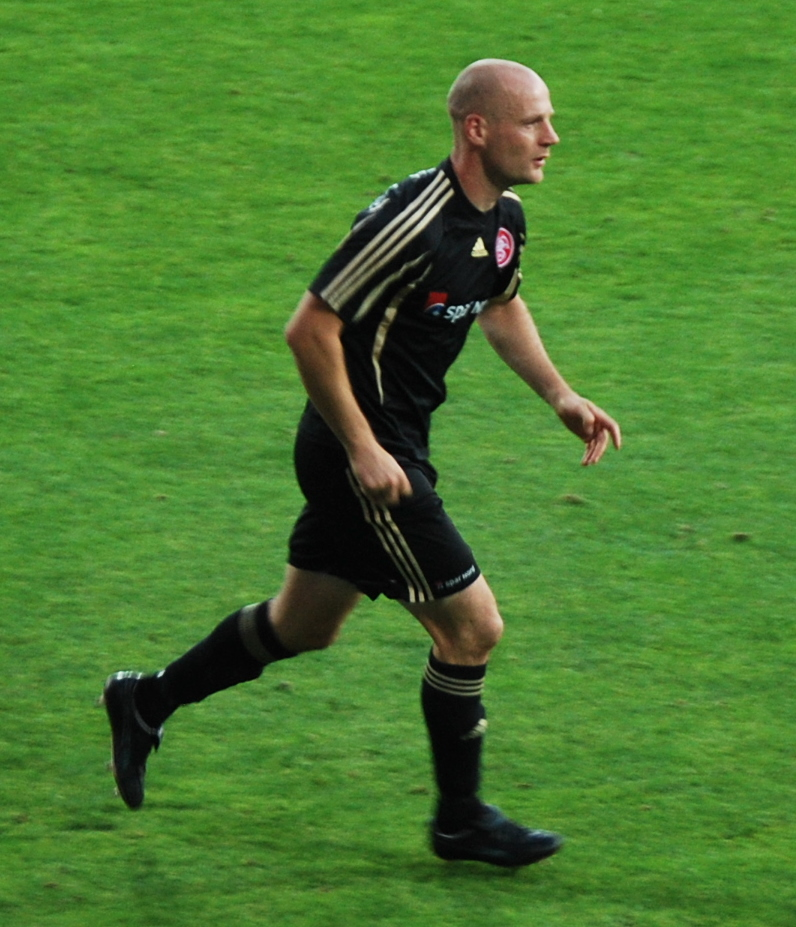
- Bøgelund in 2011

Personal information
- Full name: Kasper Bøgelund Nielsen
- Date of birth: 8 October 1980 (age 46)
- Place of birth: Odense, Denmark
- Height: 1.80 m (5 ft 11 in)
- Position: Right-back

Youth career
- Brændekilde-Bellinge Boldklub
- –1998: OB
- 1998–2000: PSV

Senior career*
Years	Team	Apps	(Gls)
2000–2005	PSV	78	(0)
2005–2008	Borussia Mönchengladbach	44	(2)
2008–2012	AaB	77	(1)
Total		199	(3)

International career
1998	Denmark U19	11	(2)
2000–2001	Denmark U21	8	(1)
2002–2008	Denmark	17	(0)
- * Club domestic league appearances and goals

Kasper Bøgelund Nielsen (born 8 October 1980) is a Danish former professional footballer who played as a right-back, notably for Dutch club PSV Eindhoven and German club Borussia Mönchengladbach. Bøgelund played 17 games for the Denmark national team, and he represented Denmark at the 2002 FIFA World Cup and 2004 European Championship.

== Club career ==
Born in Odense, Bøgelund started playing youth football for local top-flight team Odense BK.

In March 1997, Bøgelund signed his first professional contract, when he was brought to Dutch club PSV Eindhoven by Danish manager Frank Arnesen. Starting at PSV in January 1998, he played two years in the reserves, before making his senior debut under coach Eric Gerets in March 2000. He got his breakthrough with PSV in the 2001–02 season, playing 24 league matches. In the 2002–03 season, he was a part of the PSV team which won the 2003 Eredivisie championship. Following an injury in the fall 2004, Bøgelund lost his place in the PSV starting line-up, where he was replaced by André Ooijer. The season ended with PSV winning both the 2005 Eredivisie and Dutch Cup trophies.

In the summer 2005, he moved on to play for Borussia Mönchengladbach in the German Bundesliga. On 27 August 2005, Bøgelund scored a goal against Schalke 04 which was awarded "Tor des Jahres (Goal of the Year)" in January 2006 by German television network ARD. Mönchengladbach were relegated in 2007, but Bøgelund stayed with the club in the 2. Bundesliga.

Bøgelund moved on in the summer 2008, returning to Denmark to play defending Danish Superliga champions Aalborg Boldspilklub (AaB). He competed in the 2008–09 UEFA Champions League with AaB.

== International career ==
While at Odense, Bøgelund captained various Danish youth national teams, and he won the 1996 Danish Under-17 Player of the Year award.

After his PSV breakthrough, he was called up for the Denmark national team in February 2002, by national manager Morten Olsen. He was a part of the Danish squad at the 2002 FIFA World Cup, and came on as a substitute in two of Denmark's four games at the tournament. He was selected to represent Denmark at the 2004 European Championship, where he again started as a substitute. In Denmark's third match of the tournament, he came on for Niclas Jensen at half-time, and eventually replaced Jensen in the starting line-up for Denmark's final game before elimination.

Following an injury in the fall 2004, Bøgelund lost his place in the Danish national team. He re-entered the national team for one match in August 2007, while playing for Mönchengladbach, and another two in the fall 2008, while playing for AaB.

== Honours ==
PSV

- Eredivisie: 2002–03 and 2004–05
- Dutch Cup: 2004–05

Individual

- 1996 Danish Under-17 Player of the Year
