= André Ooijer =

Dutch footballer (born 1974)

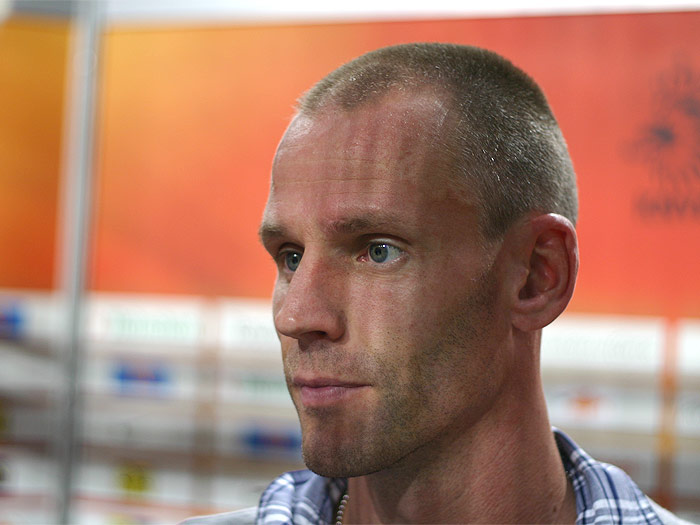
- Ooijer in 2009

Personal information
- Full name: André Antonius Maria Ooijer
- Date of birth: 11 July 1974 (age 52)
- Place of birth: Amsterdam, Netherlands
- Height: 1.84 m (6 ft 0 in)
- Position: Defender

Team information
- Current team: PSV (youth coach)

Youth career
- 1979–1982: SDW
- 1982–1986: SDZ
- 1986–1994: Ajax

Senior career*
Years	Team	Apps	(Gls)
1994–1995	→ Volendam (loan)	32	(4)
1995–1997	Roda JC	75	(9)
1997–2006	PSV	192	(19)
2006–2009	Blackburn Rovers	79	(2)
2009–2010	PSV	25	(0)
2010–2012	Ajax	22	(3)
Total		425	(37)

International career
1999–2010	Netherlands	55	(3)
Medal record
Representing Netherlands
Men's football
FIFA World Cup
Runner-up	2010	Team
- * Club domestic league appearances and goals

André Antonius Maria Ooijer (born 11 July 1974) is a Dutch former professional footballer who played as a defender for PSV, Blackburn Rovers, and Ajax.

Ooijer's international career lasted over a decade with the Netherlands and earned 57 caps. He was selected for UEFA Euro 2008 and three FIFA World Cups, helping the Dutch reach the final of the 2010 edition.

He retired in 2012.

== Club career ==
=== Early career ===
Born in Amsterdam, Ooijer joined his first amateur football team when he was five years old. Later, when he was 12 years old, he played for other amateur clubs SDW and SDZ. He went through the youth system of Ajax Amsterdam, where he would play until the age of 20.

Sensing that he had little future in a club with so much competition for a first-team place, he went on loan to Volendam for the 1994–95 season, before signing for Roda JC in the beginning of the 1995–96 season. Throughout his career at that point, he mostly played at right-back, although he could also operate at centre-back as well as defensive midfield. After two successful seasons with Roda JC, Ooijer joined PSV in the middle of the 1997–98 season.

=== PSV ===
Ooijer won the Eredivisie title with PSV five times and the KNVB Cup once. He was also a regular participant in the UEFA Champions League with the club.

On 15 July 2005, Ooijer appeared to have ended his eight-year association with PSV after he signed for Genoa, who were keen to defend their Serie A top-flight status after securing promotion in the 2004–05 season, for a fee of €1.5 million. However, following the Italian Football Federation (FIGC)'s investigation into a match-fixing allegation leveled against Genoa, and the FIGC's subsequent guilty verdict which meant that Genoa were relegated to Serie C1 as punishment; Ooijer's proposed transfer was cancelled and he returned to PSV.

=== Blackburn Rovers ===
On 23 August 2006, English Premier League club Blackburn Rovers signed Ooijer from PSV for a fee reputed to be in the region of £2 million. The defender signed an initial two-year contract, which included an option for a further one-year extension.

On 4 October 2006, Ooijer claimed that his move away from PSV was caused by the club having reneged on their proposed three-year extension for him and that if the club has not done so, he would have continued to play in the Eredivisie.

Ooijer's debut for Blackburn was against Chelsea on 27 August 2006 at Ewood Park. The player gave away a penalty after fouling John Terry and the subsequent spot-kick was scored by Frank Lampard. Ooijer was partially to blame for a second goal when he was outpaced by Didier Drogba in the match, which finished 2–0 to Chelsea. After this troubled start, which was soon followed by an own-goal in a game against Manchester City, he slowly adapted to Premier League football to become a mainstay in the Blackburn defence.

On 20 January 2007, in only his 20th league appearance for the club, Ooijer suffered a broken fibula and torn ankle ligaments after an unfortunate fall involving Bernardo Corradi during Blackburn's victory over Manchester City at the City of Manchester Stadium. The injury kept him out of the game for the remainder of his debut season in the Premier League.

On 16 August 2008, on the opening day of the 2008–09 Premier League season, Ooijer scored his first goal for the club in the 94th minute of a 3–2 win over Everton. He scored his second goal for the club on 4 April 2009, notching the winning goal in a 2–1 home game against Tottenham Hotspur F.C., a result which was critical to Rovers' survival in the Premier League.

The club exercised their right to extend the original two-year contract for a further 12 months for the 2008–09 season.

On 25 March 2009, Ooijer confirmed to PSV TV that he would be returning to PSV in May 2009, when his contract with Blackburn expired.

=== Return to PSV ===
On 21 May 2009, Ooijer agreed a one-year deal to return to PSV, bringing his stay at Ewood Park to an end. At the end of the season, his contract ended and Ooijer again left PSV.

=== Ajax ===
On 9 August 2010, Ooijer signed a one-year deal with Ajax, joining on a free transfer. He made his debut in a 3–0 win against Roda JC on 21 August. On 30 October, Ooijer scored his first goal for Ajax against Heracles Almelo. On 15 April 2011, he signed a one-year contract extension with the club.

Ooijer announced on 13 March 2012 that he would retire from football at the end of the 2011–12 season. On 6 May 2012, he played his final professional match and scored a goal for Ajax in a 3–1 win against Vitesse.

== International career ==
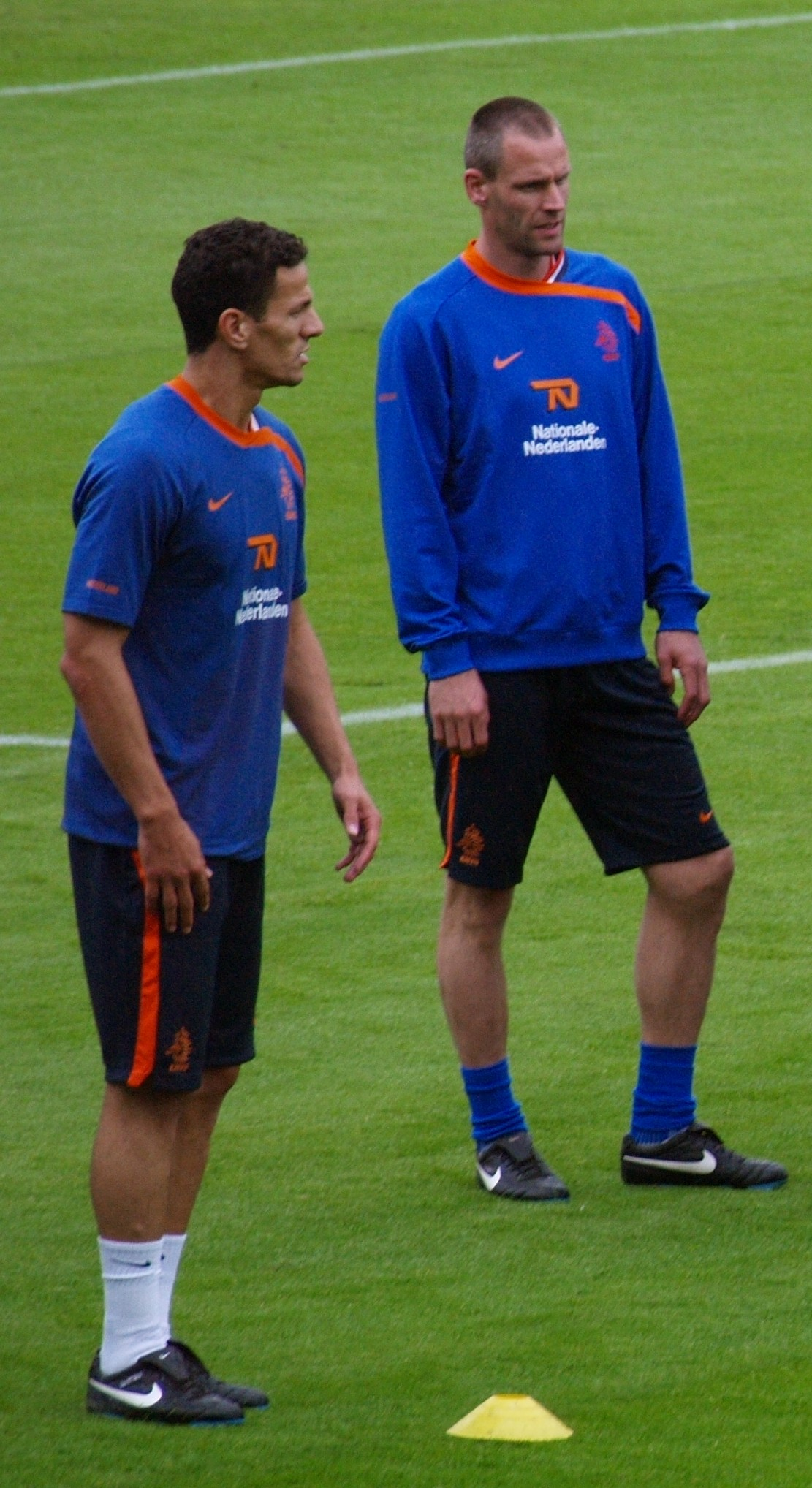
Ooijer (right) with Khalid Boulahrouz during a training in preparation for Euro 2008

Ooijer was selected as part of the Netherlands national team for the 1998 FIFA World Cup in France by manager Guus Hiddink as cover for Michael Reiziger.

Frank Rijkaard, who replaced Hiddink as the head coach of the Dutch team in 1999, took notice of Ooijer's progress at club level. During a tour of Brazil that same year, Rijkaard handed him his first appearance as a substitute for Reiziger, who was injured during the game, in a match against Brazil on 5 June 1999. The match ended in a 2–2 draw and Ooijer made a confident start to the national team. Despite his convincing performances, he was not included in the final squad for the UEFA Euro 2000 tournament on home soil after being dropped at the last minute.

After being overlooked several times for an international team spot by Louis van Gaal who took over from Rijkaard in 2001, he was able to feature for Dick Advocaat in 2003 with a solid performance in the qualification matches, including a goal against Scotland in the qualification second-leg playoff for UEFA Euro 2004 at the Amsterdam Arena.

Such was his luck, however, not to be able to feature in a major tournament up to then as he was also dropped by Advocaat in the final squad which travelled to Portugal for the Euro 2004 finals in favour of Reiziger and Johnny Heitinga, who played in the same position. Ooijer was however on the stand-by list for the tournament.

Ooijer was finally able to make a start in a major tournament when he was chosen as part of Marco van Basten's 2006 World Cup squad. He played in all four matches for his country, lasting the full 90 minutes in each game.

Ooijer was called up to the Netherlands's Euro 2008 squad in Austria and Switzerland, where he played the first two games before being rested for the last group game as the Netherlands had already qualified. He then played in the quarter-final game against Russia which Russia won 3–1, ending the Netherlands' campaign.

=== 2010 World Cup ===
Ooijer was included in the preliminary squad for the 2010 World Cup in South Africa. On 27 May, Netherlands manager Bert van Marwijk announced that the player would be part of the final squad of 23 participating in the competition.

On 2 July, Ooijer was called into the starting XI for the Netherlands' 2–1 win over Brazil just 20 minutes before kick-off to replace the injured Joris Mathijsen.

He did not play in the final of the 2010 World Cup in which they lost 1-0 against Spain.

== Managerial career ==
Ooijer began working as the coach of the under-19 squad and an assistant coach to the first team for PSV at the start of the 2014–15 season.

== Personal life ==
Ooijer is married to Joyce van de Kerkhof, the daughter of former Dutch football player Willy van de Kerkhof. He has two daughters with Joyce, Demi and Danique. He also has two sons from a previous relationship, Denzell and Cerezo.

== Career statistics ==
André Ooijer: International Goals
Goal	Date	Venue	Opponent	Score	Result	Competition
1.	19 November 2003	Amsterdam Arena, Amsterdam, Netherlands	Scotland	2–0	6–0	UEFA Euro 2004 qualifying
2.	3 September 2004	Stadion Galgenwaard, Utrecht, Netherlands	Liechtenstein	2–0	3–0	Friendly
3.	10 June 2009	De Kuip, Rotterdam, Netherlands	Norway	1–0	2–0	2010 FIFA World Cup qualification

== Honours ==
Volendam

- KNVB Cup runner-up: 1994–95

Roda JC

- KNVB Cup: 1996–97

PSV

- Eredivisie: 1999–2000, 2000–01, 2002–03, 2004–05, 2005–06
- Johan Cruyff Shield: 2000

Ajax

- Eredivisie: 2010–11, 2011–12

Netherlands

- FIFA World Cup runner-up: 2010
