= Arnold Bruggink =

Dutch footballer (born 1977)

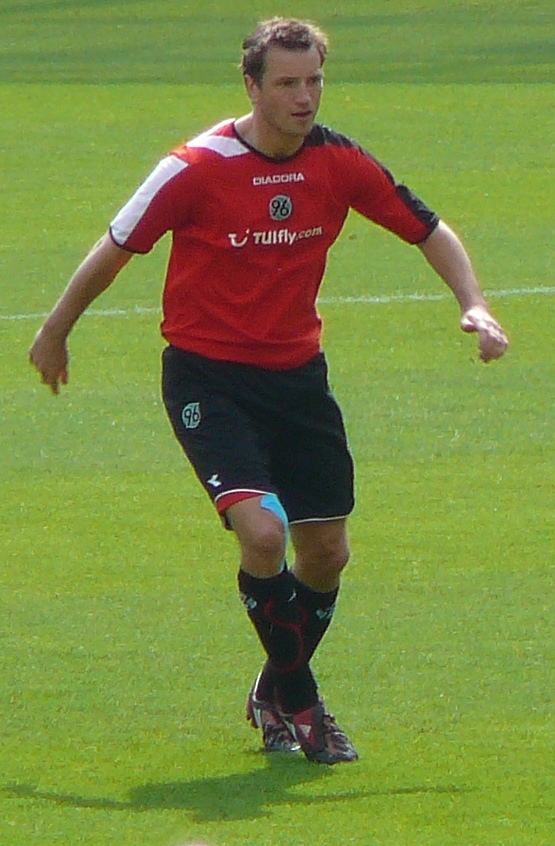
- Bruggink playing for Hannover in 2008

Personal information
- Date of birth: 24 July 1977 (age 49)
- Place of birth: Almelo, Netherlands
- Height: 1.84 m (6 ft 0 in)
- Position: Attacking midfielder

Senior career*
Years	Team	Apps	(Gls)
1993–1997	Twente	99	(34)
1997–2003	PSV	152	(59)
2003–2004	Mallorca	26	(7)
2004–2006	Heerenveen	53	(7)
2006–2010	Hannover 96	111	(20)
2010–2011	Twente	6	(0)
Total		447	(127)

International career
1995–1999	Netherlands U21	31	(15)
2000	Netherlands	2	(0)
- * Club domestic league appearances and goals

Arnold Bruggink (born 24 July 1977) is a Dutch former professional footballer who played as an attacking midfielder.

== Club career ==
Born in Almelo, Overijssel, Bruggink started his professional career at Twente, where he became the club's leading goalscorer in the 1995–96 season.

He joined PSV Eindhoven in 1997, winning the Dutch Talent of the Year award in 2000. He also won three league titles and two Supercups with the club, as well as appearing in the UEFA Champions League.

After six seasons in Eindhoven, he moved to Spanish club Mallorca in 2003, where he played in the UEFA Cup.

Bruggink moved back to his homeland after just one season, joining Heerenveen. He spent two seasons playing for them in the Eredivisie and in two successive UEFA Cup campaigns, before again heading abroad when he joined German side Hannover 96 in 2006. He left the club after his contract was not renewed at the end of the 2009–10 season.

He rejoined Twente, only to finish his career after one season.

== International career ==
Bruggink played 31 times for the Dutch U-21 national team, which equals a record with Roy Makaay. He made two appearances for the Dutch national team in 2000, a 2002 World Cup qualifier against the Republic of Ireland on 2 September and a friendly against Spain on 15 November.

== Retirement ==
Bruggink currently works as a pundit and color commentator for several TV stations in the Netherlands and Germany.

== Honours ==
PSV

- Eredivisie: 1999–2000, 2000–01, 2002–03
- Johan Cruyff Shield: 1997, 1998, 2000, 2001
