= Léon Hese =

Dutch footballer

Personal information
- Full name: Léon Hese
- Date of birth: 10 March 1981 (age 45)
- Place of birth: Arnhem, Netherlands
- Height: 1.80 m (5 ft 11 in)
- Position: Centre back

Youth career
- Vitesse 1892
- Vitesse
- 1997–2001: PSV

Senior career*
Years	Team	Apps	(Gls)
2001–2003	PSV	1	(0)
2002–2003	→ Eindhoven (loan)	27	(2)
2003–2004	→ Helmond Sport (loan)	13	(3)
2004–2006	Helmond Sport	49	(3)
2006–2009	De Graafschap	87	(4)
2009–2012	Cambuur	78	(6)
2012–2013	Spakenburg	21	(3)
2013–2015	TEC		
Total		276	(21)

International career
1998–1999	Netherlands U19	8	(0)
2002	Netherlands U21	1	(0)
- * Club domestic league appearances and goals

Léon Hese (born 10 March 1981 in Arnhem) is a Dutch retired footballer.

== Club career ==
He played for De Graafschap, Helmond Sport, FC Eindhoven, PSV, SC Cambuur and Spakenburg.

He joined TEC from fellow amateur side Spakenburg in 2013. He returned to the club in 2021 to be assistant to head coach Hans van de Haar. He worked as a video analyst at De Graafschap from 2022 until 2025, a job he had done earlier for hometown club Vitesse. He then took up a similar position at the Indonesia FA.

== International career ==
Hese played for the Netherlands national under-21 football team and 8 games for the U19s.
