= Marquinho (footballer, born 1982) =

Brazilian footballer

Personal information
- Full name: Marco Aurélio Pereira Alves
- Date of birth: 20 February 1982 (age 44)
- Place of birth: Machado, Minas Gerais, Brazil
- Height: 1.72 m (5 ft 8 in)
- Position: Attacking midfielder

Youth career
- 1999: São Paulo

Senior career*
Years	Team	Apps	(Gls)
2000	Alianza		
2000–2004	PSV	2	(0)
2005	Fluminense		
2005	Paysandu		
2005	Atlético Mineiro		
2006–2007	Guarani		
2007–2011	Tombense-MG		
2007	→ Guarani (loan)	2	(0)
2008	→ Vasco (loan)		
2009	→ Botafogo (loan)	3	(0)
2010	→ Figueirense (loan)	0	(0)
2011	→ Anapolina (loan)		
2012	Fortaleza		
2012	Brasiliense	2	(0)
2013–	CRAC		
- * Club domestic league appearances and goals

Marco Aurélio Pereira Alves, known simply as Marquinho (born 20 February 1982 in Machado, Minas Gerais), is a Brazilian attacking midfielder. He last played for Boavista Sport Club. He has played professionally for a number of clubs in Brazil as well as stints in Perú and The Netherlands.

== Honours ==
- Dutch Championship: 2000, 2001.
- Carioca Championship: 2005.

== Contract ==
- Vasco (Loan) 1 January 2008 to 30 June 2008.
- Tombense 26 June 2007 to 25 June 2010.
