= John de Jong =

Dutch footballer

Personal information
- Full name: Johannes Jacobus de Jong
- Date of birth: 8 March 1977 (age 49)
- Place of birth: The Hague, Netherlands
- Height: 1.83 m (6 ft 0 in)
- Position: Midfielder

Youth career
- VV Wilhelmus
- Den Haag

Senior career*
Years	Team	Apps	(Gls)
1995–1997	Den Haag	69	(19)
1998–2000	Utrecht	71	(16)
2000–2008	PSV	92	(18)
2002–2003	→ Heerenveen (loan)	26	(9)
Total		258	(62)
- * Club domestic league appearances and goals

Johannes Jacobus “John” de Jong (born 8 March 1977) is a Dutch retired professional footballer who played as an attacking midfielder.

Best known for his lengthy spell with PSV, he had good passing abilities, also having his career cut short by injury, retiring at 30. He amassed Eredivisie totals of 189 games and 43 goals, over the course of ten seasons.

== Club career ==
Born in The Hague (Den Haag), de Jong started his professional career with his hometown club ADO Den Haag, in the second division. In January 1998, his solid performances led to a move to the Eredivisie with FC Utrecht, where he continued to perform well.

For 2000–01, de Jong joined PSV Eindhoven. After a good run in his debut campaign (28 matches, three goals, national league conquered) and the second, he was loaned to SC Heerenveen for one season.

On 26 February 2008, after having only played 15 games in four years, all in 2004–05, de Jong retired from football due to an injury he sustained in training in 2005. He was unable to recover even after 35 months of rehabilitation, and subsequently expressed interest in staying at PSV in a non-footballing capacity.

== Honours ==
PSV

- Eredivisie: 2000–01
- KNVB Cup: 2004–05
- Johan Cruyff Shield: 2000, 2001, 2003
