= 2002–03 Eredivisie =

47th season of the Eredivisie

Eredivisie
- Season: 2002–03
- Dates: 16 August 2002 – 29 May 2003
- Champions: PSV (17th title)
- Promoted: RBC Roosendaal; FC Zwolle; Excelsior
- Relegated: Excelsior; De Graafschap
- Champions League: PSV; Ajax
- UEFA Cup: Feyenoord; NAC Breda; NEC; FC Utrecht
- Intertoto Cup: SC Heerenveen; Willem II
- Goals: 903
- Average goals/game: 2.95
- Top goalscorer: (Federal Republic of Yugoslavia) Mateja Kežman (35 goals)

Locations of the 2002–03 Eredivisie teams
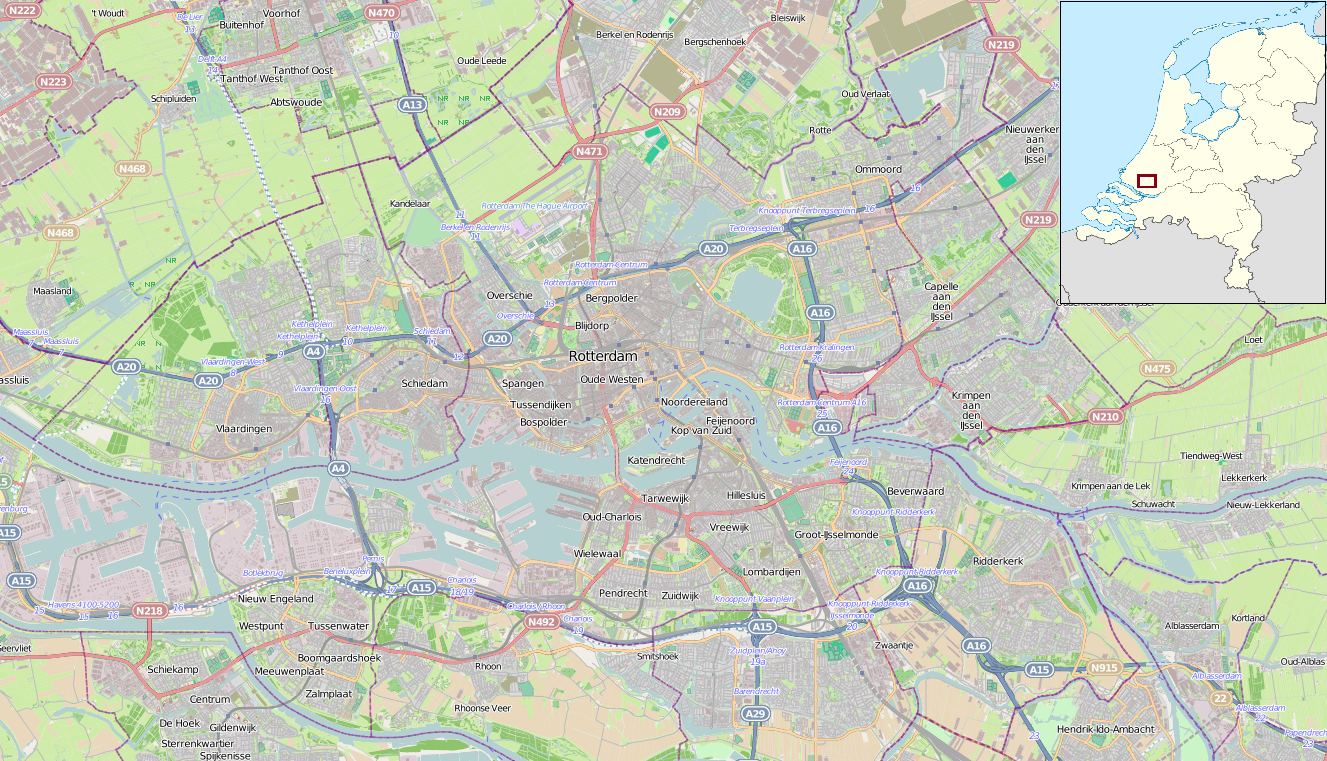
Rotterdam Eredivisie football clubs

The Dutch Eredivisie in the 2002–03 season was contested by 18 teams. PSV won the championship.

== League standings ==
Pos	Team	Pld	W	D	L	GF	GA	GD	Pts	Qualification or relegation
1	PSV (C)	34	26	6	2	87	20	+67	84	Qualification to Champions League group stage
2	Ajax	34	26	5	3	96	32	+64	83	Qualification to Champions League third qualifying round
3	Feyenoord	34	25	5	4	89	39	+50	80	Qualification to UEFA Cup first round
4	NAC Breda	34	13	13	8	42	31	+11	52	Qualification to UEFA Cup first round
5	NEC	34	14	9	11	41	40	+1	51	Qualification to UEFA Cup first round
6	Roda JC	34	14	8	12	58	54	+4	50	
7	SC Heerenveen	34	13	8	13	61	55	+6	47	Qualification to Intertoto Cup third round
8	FC Utrecht	34	12	11	11	49	49	0	47	Qualification to UEFA Cup first round (Note: FC Utrecht qualified for the UEFA Cup by winning the 2002–03 KNVB Cup.)
9	RKC Waalwijk	34	14	4	16	44	51	−7	46	
10	AZ	34	12	8	14	50	69	−19	44	
11	Willem II	34	11	9	14	48	51	−3	42	Qualification to Intertoto Cup second round
12	FC Twente	34	10	11	13	36	45	−9	41	
13	RBC Roosendaal	34	10	6	18	33	54	−21	36	
14	Vitesse Arnhem	34	8	9	17	37	51	−14	33	
15	FC Groningen	34	7	11	16	28	44	−16	32	
16	FC Zwolle	34	8	8	18	31	62	−31	32	Qualification to Relegation play-offs (Note: FC Zwolle remained in the Eredivisie after winning their promotion/relegation play-offs. Excelsior lost and relegated.)
17	Excelsior (R)	34	5	8	21	38	72	−34	23	Qualification to Relegation play-offs
18	De Graafschap (R)	34	6	5	23	35	84	−49	23	Relegation to Eerste Divisie

Rules for classification: 1) Points; 2) Goal difference; 3) Goals scored; 4) Head-to-head points; 5) Head-to-head goal difference; 6) Head-to-head away goals scored; 7) Play-off if relevant for deciding champion, relegation or participating in a European league, otherwise by draw. 8) Penalty shoot-out (only after a play-off)
(C) Champions; (R) Relegated

== Results ==
Home \ Away	AJX	AZ	EXC	FEY	GRA	GRO	HEE	NAC	NEC	PSV	RBC	RKC	RJC	TWE	UTR	VIT	WIL	ZWO
Ajax		6–2	2–1	1–1	7–1	2–1	3–0	2–2	6–0	2–4	4–1	6–1	4–2	2–1	3–1	2–0	3–0	2–0
AZ	1–3		4–1	1–4	3–1	4–1	3–3	3–1	0–0	0–4	2–0	2–0	1–0	1–2	2–0	1–3	3–2	1–1
Excelsior	0–2	1–2		2–6	3–4	4–2	1–0	0–3	0–0	0–2	1–2	1–2	0–2	2–2	1–1	4–4	0–3	0–1
Feyenoord	1–2	6–1	4–1		2–0	4–1	5–0	2–1	2–0	3–1	1–0	2–1	3–1	4–2	2–1	2–1	5–1	2–0
De Graafschap	1–1	1–2	1–1	3–4		1–0	1–5	3–2	1–3	1–6	2–0	2–4	1–1	0–1	1–0	0–1	1–1	3–2
Groningen	1–3	1–0	1–0	0–2	3–1		1–1	0–0	0–0	0–0	1–0	2–3	3–2	0–0	0–0	1–2	1–1	4–0
SC Heerenveen	0–3	5–0	2–0	3–1	3–1	2–1		0–2	2–3	0–1	6–0	1–2	3–2	3–0	2–2	2–2	1–1	2–0
NAC Breda	0–3	4–0	2–1	1–1	1–0	0–0	1–1		0–0	2–2	1–0	1–0	2–2	2–0	2–0	0–0	0–0	2–0
N.E.C.	1–2	2–0	1–0	1–2	1–0	2–0	4–2	2–0		0–5	3–0	0–0	2–4	1–2	1–2	2–0	1–0	0–0
PSV Eindhoven	2–0	2–2	7–0	1–2	4–0	1–0	3–1	1–0	2–1		3–0	4–0	0–0	2–0	2–0	1–0	2–1	6–0
RBC Roosendaal	2–3	0–0	1–1	4–2	1–0	2–0	3–0	1–2	0–2	0–3		0–0	4–0	1–0	0–1	3–1	1–0	1–1
RKC Waalwijk	1–1	2–0	0–3	1–0	4–2	1–0	3–0	2–3	0–1	0–1	1–2		2–1	3–2	0–1	1–0	3–1	0–2
Roda JC	1–1	1–3	2–3	2–2	5–0	5–1	1–0	0–0	2–1	2–3	1–0	1–0		2–0	1–0	2–0	1–0	2–0
Twente	1–2	0–0	1–0	1–5	3–0	0–0	1–1	0–0	1–2	0–0	3–0	2–1	3–3		1–1	1–0	0–2	0–0
Utrecht	1–0	2–2	2–2	1–2	4–0	0–0	2–2	1–0	3–2	1–3	2–2	4–3	4–4	3–2		1–0	1–1	2–0
Vitesse Arnhem	1–2	2–2	1–2	1–1	1–1	0–0	1–2	3–1	1–1	0–5	3–0	1–1	0–2	0–1	1–4		2–0	2–1
Willem II	0–6	3–1	2–1	1–1	3–0	1–0	1–5	1–1	1–1	1–1	3–1	0–1	5–0	1–2	2–0	1–3		5–2
Zwolle	0–5	5–1	1–1	1–3	2–1	0–2	0–1	0–3	0–0	1–3	1–1	2–1	3–1	1–1	3–1	1–0	0–3	

Source: Eredivisie.nl (in Dutch)
Legend: Blue = home team win; Yellow = draw; Red = away team win.

== Promotion/relegation play-offs ==
Group A
Pos	Team	Pld	W	D	L	GF	GA	GD	Pts
1	FC Zwolle	6	4	2	0	12	5	+7	14
2	Helmond Sport	6	3	1	2	9	10	−1	10
3	FC Den Bosch	6	2	1	3	7	10	−3	7
4	Go Ahead Eagles	6	1	0	5	9	12	−3	3

Group B
Pos	Team	Pld	W	D	L	GF	GA	GD	Pts
1	FC Volendam (P)	6	4	0	2	12	7	+5	12
2	FC Emmen	6	3	0	3	6	6	0	9
3	Excelsior	6	3	0	3	8	9	−1	9
4	Heracles Almelo	6	2	0	4	6	10	−4	6

(P) Promoted to the Eredivisie following play-offs

== Top scorers ==
Goals	Player	Team
35	(Serbia and Montenegro) Mateja Kežman	PSV
28	(Netherlands) Pierre van Hooijdonk	Feyenoord
20	(Netherlands) Dirk Kuyt	Utrecht
18	(Belgium) Thomas Buffel	Feyenoord
18	(Netherlands) Rafael van der Vaart	Ajax
16	(Netherlands) Rick Hoogendorp	RKC Waalwijk
15	(Ghana) Matthew Amoah	Vitesse Arnhem
13	(Sweden) Zlatan Ibrahimović	Ajax
12	(Netherlands) Orlando Engelaar	NAC Breda
12	(Netherlands) Arjen Robben	PSV

== Attendances ==
No.	Club	Average	Change	Highest
1	AFC Ajax	47,148	32,5%	50,777
2	Feyenoord	43,124	8,1%	46,200
3	PSV	33,165	5,3%	35,200
4	SBV Vitesse	22,959	-7,3%	26,000
5	FC Utrecht	16,081	23,0%	18,925
6	sc Heerenveen	14,259	-0,3%	14,400
7	NAC Breda	13,743	3,3%	15,700
8	Roda JC	13,697	-1,5%	17,500
9	Willem II	13,466	-1,4%	14,700
10	FC Twente	13,234	0,2%	13,500
11	FC Groningen	11,938	-2,5%	12,800
12	NEC	11,106	6,5%	12,500
13	De Graafschap	10,841	-0,5%	12,000
14	AZ	7,225	2,0%	8,720
15	RKC Waalwijk	6,601	4,7%	8,200
16	PEC Zwolle	5,948	40,6%	6,750
17	RBC Roosendaal	4,965	26,2%	5,000
18	SBV Excelsior	3,087	49,3%	3,768

== See also ==
- 2002–03 Eerste Divisie
- 2002–03 KNVB Cup
