= 2000–01 Eredivisie =

45th season of the Eredivisie

Eredivisie
- Season: 2000–01
- Dates: 18 August 2000 – 31 May 2001
- Champions: PSV (16th title)
- Promoted: NAC Breda; FC Groningen; RBC Roosendaal
- Relegated: RBC Roosendaal
- Champions League: PSV; Feyenoord; Ajax
- UEFA Cup: Roda JC; FC Utrecht; FC Twente
- Intertoto Cup: RKC Waalwijk sc Heerenveen
- Goals: 922
- Average goals/game: 3.01
- Top goalscorer: (Federal Republic of Yugoslavia) Mateja Kežman (24 goals)

The 2000–01 Eredivisie season was contested by 18 teams. PSV won the championship.

== League standings ==
Pos	Team	Pld	W	D	L	GF	GA	GD	Pts	Qualification or relegation
1	PSV Eindhoven (C)	34	25	8	1	73	23	+50	83	Qualification to Champions League group stage
2	Feyenoord	34	21	3	10	67	37	+30	66	Qualification to Champions League group stage
3	Ajax	34	18	7	9	85	43	+42	61	Qualification to Champions League third qualifying round
4	Roda JC Kerkrade	34	17	8	9	59	41	+18	59	Qualification to UEFA Cup first round (Note: FC Twente qualified for the UEFA Cup by winning the 2000–01 KNVB Cup.)
5	Utrecht	34	17	8	9	58	43	+15	59	Qualification to UEFA Cup first round
6	Vitesse	34	16	11	7	56	43	+13	59	
7	RKC Waalwijk	34	16	11	7	48	36	+12	59	Qualification to Intertoto Cup third round
8	Willem II	34	14	9	11	60	50	+10	51	
9	NAC Breda	34	13	10	11	41	40	+1	49	
10	Heerenveen	34	11	14	9	51	42	+9	47	Qualification to Intertoto Cup second round
11	Twente	34	10	11	13	47	60	−13	41	Qualification to UEFA Cup first round
12	NEC Nijmegen	34	9	13	12	42	53	−11	40	
13	AZ	34	9	8	17	45	63	−18	35	
14	Groningen	34	8	9	17	36	56	−20	33	
15	De Graafschap	34	9	4	21	44	66	−22	31	
16	Fortuna Sittard	34	8	7	19	31	64	−33	31	Qualification to Relegation play-offs (Note: Fortuna Sittard and Sparta both remained in the Eredivisie after winning their promotion/relegation play-offs.)
17	Sparta Rotterdam	34	6	7	21	42	72	−30	25	Qualification to Relegation play-offs
18	RBC Roosendaal (R)	34	4	2	28	37	90	−53	14	Relegation to Eerste Divisie

Source: voetbal.com
Rules for classification: 1) Points; 2) Goal difference; 3) Goals scored; 4) Head-to-head points; 5) Head-to-head goal difference; 6) Head-to-head away goals scored; 7) Play-off if relevant for deciding champion, relegation or participating in a European league, otherwise by draw. 8) Penalty shoot-out (only after a play-off)
(C) Champions; (R) Relegated

== Results ==
Home \ Away	AJA	AZ	DBO	FEY	FOR	GRA	GRO	HEE	NAC	NEC	PSV	RKC	RJC	SPA	TWE	UTR	VIT	WIL
Ajax	—	1–0	2–0	3–4	4–0	4–0	4–3	2–0	1–3	5–0	1–3	3–1	1–1	9–0	3–2	1–0	5–1	4–1
AZ	0–0	—	3–2	1–3	3–0	2–1	3–2	0–2	2–1	5–0	1–1	0–1	1–2	3–0	0–2	1–0	0–0	2–2
Den Bosch	0–1	0–1	—	0–0	4–0	3–1	1–4	0–0	1–2	2–1	0–1	1–0	3–1	1–1	1–3	1–1	4–1	1–2
Feyenoord	3–1	4–1	3–0	—	1–0	2–0	1–0	3–2	0–0	5–0	0–0	1–1	5–0	5–0	1–2	4–0	3–2	3–1
Fortuna Sittard	1–1	0–1	1–3	1–2	—	2–1	0–1	1–0	2–3	2–2	0–1	1–4	0–0	3–4	2–0	3–3	0–0	1–2
De Graafschap	1–1	3–0	0–1	1–0	5–0	—	1–2	1–2	4–2	1–1	2–2	3–1	2–1	3–0	4–2	0–0	0–2	1–1
Groningen	1–4	0–1	2–0	0–1	4–2	2–0	—	1–1	3–0	2–2	2–2	1–1	0–2	0–0	3–0	2–2	0–1	1–0
Heerenveen	5–1	2–1	2–0	1–0	3–1	1–0	2–0	—	5–0	4–0	4–1	2–0	0–0	3–0	0–0	1–2	1–1	3–0
NAC	0–1	3–1	0–0	2–1	3–1	1–0	5–0	2–1	—	1–3	2–0	0–1	2–1	2–2	3–3	1–0	3–3	1–1
NEC	0–2	1–0	2–1	0–3	3–1	3–1	1–0	1–0	1–3	—	0–4	1–0	1–0	1–1	2–0	0–3	1–0	3–0
PSV	1–1	3–0	3–2	2–0	3–0	4–0	8–0	4–1	3–1	3–1	—	2–0	4–1	3–0	1–0	4–0	0–2	6–0
RKC	0–2	3–2	3–3	2–3	1–0	2–0	4–0	2–1	4–1	2–1	2–1	—	3–0	1–1	3–1	1–2	3–2	0–1
Roda	1–1	0–0	4–1	0–2	1–0	0–1	3–1	0–2	1–1	0–0	0–1	1–0	—	3–0	2–1	1–0	0–2	2–0
Sparta Rotterdam	3–0	0–4	1–1	0–5	0–0	1–3	0–0	1–4	2–3	0–0	2–1	0–0	0–3	—	1–1	3–1	0–1	3–2
Twente	0–2	0–0	4–0	3–2	1–1	0–0	0–1	0–0	1–2	2–0	1–1	1–0	3–0	2–0	—	2–0	0–0	0–0
Utrecht	3–1	3–2	3–1	2–2	3–0	6–0	3–1	0–0	0–0	1–4	3–3	2–1	4–1	4–2	1–1	—	3–1	3–1
Vitesse	3–1	1–0	1–1	2–1	1–1	2–1	1–0	0–0	1–0	2–1	0–0	1–1	2–0	1–1	2–0	1–0	—	4–2
Willem II	1–3	2–2	1–1	0–0	3–0	2–2	3–1	2–2	2–2	3–1	3–1	3–1	1–1	4–0	3–3	4–2	1–1	—

Legend: Blue = home team win; Yellow = draw; Red = away team win.

== Promotion/relegation play-offs ==
In the promotion/relegation competition, eight entrants (six from the Eerste Divisie and two from this league) entered in two groups. The group winners were promoted to (or remained in) the Eredivisie.

Group 1
Pos	Team	Pld	W	D	L	GF	GA	GD	Pts	Qualification
1	Fortuna Sittard	6	3	1	2	9	6	+3	10	Remain in Eredivisie
2	FC Zwolle	6	2	3	1	6	4	+2	9	Remain in Eerste Divisie
3	FC Volendam	6	3	0	3	6	4	+2	9	Remain in Eerste Divisie
4	Telstar	6	1	2	3	7	10	−3	5	Remain in Eerste Divisie

Group 2
Pos	Team	Pld	W	D	L	GF	GA	GD	Pts	Qualification
1	Sparta Rotterdam	6	4	1	1	14	8	+6	13	Remain in Eredivisie
2	Cambuur Leeuwarden	6	3	0	3	11	13	−2	9	Remain in Eerste Divisie
3	Excelsior	6	2	1	3	14	14	0	7	Remain in Eerste Divisie
4	Go Ahead Eagles	6	1	2	3	9	13	−4	5	Remain in Eerste Divisie

== Attendances ==
Feyenoord drew the highest average home attendance in the 2000-01 edition of the Eredivisie.

#	Football club	Home games	Average attendance
1	Feyenoord	17	37,609
2	AFC Ajax	17	36,339
3	PSV	17	31,294
4	Vitesse	17	25,725
5	sc Heerenveen	17	14,188
6	Willem II	17	13,727
7	FC Utrecht	17	13,506
8	Roda JC	17	13,300
9	FC Twente	17	13,212
10	NAC Breda	17	12,758
11	FC Groningen	17	11,542
12	De Graafschap	17	10,250
13	NEC	17	10,088
14	Fortuna Sittard	17	8,371
15	Sparta Rotterdam	17	7,755
16	AZ	17	7,155
17	RKC Waalwijk	17	5,434
18	RBC Roosendaal	17	5,081

== See also ==
- 2000–01 Eerste Divisie
- 2000–01 KNVB Cup
