= 2003–04 Feyenoord season =

Feyenoord
2003-04 season
- Chairman: Jorien van den Herik
- Manager: (Netherlands) Bert van Marwijk
- Stadium: De Kuip
- Eredivisie: 3rd (qualified for UEFA Cup)
- Amstel Cup: Quarter-final
- UEFA Cup: Second round
- Top goalscorer: League: Dirk Kuyt (20); All: Dirk Kuyt (22)
Home colours	Away colours	Third colours

During the 2003–04 Dutch football season, Feyenoord competed in the Eredivisie.

== Season summary ==
Feyenoord equaled last's seasons results and finished 3rd, with 12 points less than the previous year. The club made it to the quarter-finals in the domestic KNVB cup, losing to FC Twente. In the UEFA cup they made it to the 2nd round losing to the FK Teplice from Czech Republic.

== Kits ==
Feyenoord's kits were manufactured by Italian company Kappa and sponsored by insurance company Stad Rotterdam Verzekeringen.

== Squad ==
Squad at end of season
In () brackets where they came from.

Note: Flags indicate national team as defined under FIFA eligibility rules; some limited exceptions apply. Players may hold more than one non-FIFA nationality.

No.	Pos.	Nation	Player
1	GK	NED	Edwin Zoetebier
2	DF	GHA	Christian Gyan
3	DF	NED	Peter van den Berg (from (Netherlands) RKC Waalwijk)
4	DF	DEN	Patrick Mtiliga (from (Netherlands) SBV Excelsior)
4	DF	BEL	Pieter Collen (back from loan (Netherlands) NAC Breda)
5	DF	NED	Ramon van Haaren
6	MF	NED	Alfred Schreuder (from (Netherlands) NAC Breda)
7	FW	NED	Dirk Kuyt (from (Netherlands) FC Utrecht)
8	MF	NED	Kees van Wonderen
9	FW	SCG	Danko Lazović (from (Serbia and Montenegro) FK Partizan Belgrad)
10	MF	NED	Anthony Lurling
11	MF	BRA	Leonardo
14	MF	JPN	Shinji Ono
15	FW	ARG	Mariano Bombarda

No.	Pos.	Nation	Player
16	FW	POL	Ebi Smolarek
17	DF	NED	Patrick Paauwe
19	DF	BEL	Thomas Buffel
20	MF	CHI	Jorge Acuña
22	DF	BRA	Jean Carlos Dondé (from (Brazil) Atletico Paranaense)
23	MF	EGY	Hossam Ghaly (from (Egypt) El-Ahly)
24	DF	KOR	Chong-Gug Song
25	MF	CHI	Sebastián Pardo
26	DF	NED	Gerard de Nooijer
27	DF	NED	Glenn Loovens
28	MF	BEL	Gill Swerts
30	GK	NED	Patrick Lodewijks
31	GK	POL	Zbigniew Małkowski
32	FW	NED	Robin van Persie
33	MF	NED	Ferne Snoyl
34	MF	NED	Joep van den Ouweland

=== Left club during season ===
Note: Flags indicate national team as defined under FIFA eligibility rules; some limited exceptions apply. Players may hold more than one non-FIFA nationality.

No.	Pos.	Nation	Player
21	FW	SWE	Johan Elmander (on loan to (Netherlands) NAC Breda)
18	MF	BRA	Leonardo II (on loan to (Netherlands) ADO Den Haag)

=== Left club at the end of previous season ===
Note: Flags indicate national team as defined under FIFA eligibility rules; some limited exceptions apply. Players may hold more than one non-FIFA nationality.

No.	Pos.	Nation	Player
6	MF	NED	Paul Bosvelt (to (England) Manchester City F.C.)
23	MF	AUS	Brett Emerton (to (England) Blackburn Rovers F.C.)
9	FW	NED	Pierre van Hooijdonk (to (Turkey) Fenerbahçe S.K.)
7	FW	CIV	Bonaventure Kalou (to (France) AJ Auxerre)
3	DF	POL	Rząsa (to (Serbia and Montenegro) FK Partizan Belgrad)
31	GK	NED	Carlo l'Ami (retired)

== Results ==
=== Eredivisie ===
17 August 2003 1	Feyenoord	2 – 0	NEC Nijmegen	Rotterdam
14:30 CEST	Lazović 52'; Kuyt (yellow card) 55'; Paauwe (yellow card) 55'; Buffel 75'; Schreuder (yellow card) 82'	report	Demouge (yellow card) 57'; Zonneveld (yellow card) 57'	Stadium: De Kuip; Attendance: 42.000; Referee: van Hulten

23 August 2003 2	SC Heerenveen	1 – 0	Feyenoord	Heerenveen
19:30 CEST	Sibon 19'; Väyrynen (yellow card) 46'	report	Lazović (yellow card) 42'; van Persie (yellow card) 71'; van den Berg (yellow card) 73'; Schreuder (yellow card) 81'	Stadium: Abe Lenstra Stadion; Attendance: 14.600; Referee: Haverkort

31 August 2003 3	Feyenoord	2 – 1	NAC Breda	Rotterdam
12:30 CEST	van den Berg (yellow card) 14'; van Wonderen (yellow card) 55'; Bombarda 83'; Buffel 90'	report	Diba 24'; Peto (yellow card) 55'	Stadium: De Kuip; Attendance: 34.000; Referee: Jol

14 September 2003 4	AZ Alkmaar	2 – 2	Feyenoord	Alkmaar
12:30 CEST	van Galen 14'; Elkhattabi 43'; Wijker (yellow card) 8' (yellow card) 58' (red card) 58'	report	Kuyt 8' (pen.), 80'	Stadium: Alkmaarderhout; Attendance: 8.031; Referee: Braamhaar

21 September 2003 5	Feyenoord	1 – 3	PSV Eindhoven	Rotterdam
12:30 CEST	de Nooijer (yellow card) 5'; Buffel 20'; Schreuder (yellow card) 47'; Paauwe (yellow card) 78'	report	Kežman 7', 55'; Colin (yellow card) 9'; Vogel (yellow card) 9'; Vennegoor of Hesselink 74'	Stadium: De Kuip; Attendance: 41.000; Referee: Temmink

28 September 2003 6	PEC Zwolle	0 – 3	Feyenoord	Zwolle
14:30 CEST		report	van den Berg (yellow card) 33'; Acuña (yellow card) 40'; Shinji Ono 53', 71' (yellow card) 73'; Lurling 69'	Stadium: Oosterenkstadion; Attendance: 6.600; Referee: Koopman

5 October 2003 7	Feyenoord	2 – 0	RBC Roosendaal	Rotterdam
14:30 CEST	van Persie 14'; Lurling 89'; van Wonderen (yellow card) 89'	report	Oliseh (yellow card) 48'; Hesp (yellow card) 74'	Stadium: De Kuip; Attendance: 41.000; Referee: Luijten

19 October 2003 8	Roda JC	1 – 1	Feyenoord	Kerkrade
12:30 CEST	Sergio 34'	report	Kuyt 3'	Stadium: Parkstad Limburg Stadion; Attendance: 13.000; Referee: Luinge

26 October 2003 9	Feyenoord	2 – 1	Willem II	Rotterdam
14:30 CEST	Lurling 31'; Buffel 90'; Schreuder (yellow card) 90'	report	Mathijsen (yellow card) 13'; Quinn 88'	Stadium: De Kuip; Attendance: 44.000; Referee: Haverkort

2 November 2003 10	FC Groningen	3 – 3	Feyenoord	Groningen
14:30 CEST	Elshot 41'; Drent 53'; Landerl (yellow card) 68'; Hugo 77'; van Gessel 89'	report	Lurling 5'; Kuyt 35'; Paauwe 45'; Acuña (yellow card) 61'	Stadium: Oosterpark Stadion; Attendance: 16.000; Referee: Braamhaar

9 November 2003 11	FC Volendam	1 – 3	Feyenoord	Volendam
12:30 CEST	Ouichou 7'; Tuyp (yellow card) 15'	report	Kuyt 4' (pen.), 86'; van den Berg (yellow card) 78'; van Persie 81'	Stadium: Kras Stadion; Attendance: 6.113; Referee: Jol

22 November 2003 12	Feyenoord	3 – 0	Vitesse Arnhem	Rotterdam
20:00 CEST	van Persie 22'; Paauwe 44'; Kuyt 80'	report	Fränkel (yellow card) 62'; Ranković (red card) 89'	Stadium: De Kuip; Attendance: 40.500; Referee: van Hulten

30 November 2003 13	Ajax	2 – 0	Feyenoord	Amsterdam
12:30 CEST	van der Vaart 4', 11'	report	Swerts (yellow card) 28'; Schreuder (yellow card) 83'	Stadium: Amsterdam Arena; Attendance: 51.344; Referee: Bossen

7 December 2003 14	Feyenoord	4 – 1	ADO Den Haag	Rotterdam
14:30 CEST	van Persie 24', 47'; Lurling (yellow card) 27'; van Wonderen 45'; Pardo 58'	report	van der Gun 14' (yellow card) 71'; Bodde (yellow card) 64'; van der Leegte (yellow card) 68'	Stadium: De Kuip; Attendance: 40.800; Referee: Luinge

13 December 2003 15	FC Twente	4 – 2	Feyenoord	Enschede
19:30 CEST	N'Kufo 10', 30' (yellow card) 55'; Zomer (yellow card) 14'; Ouédraogo (yellow card) 18'; John 56'; Polak 67' (pen.)	report	Kuyt 44'; Schreuder (yellow card) 66'; Smolarek (yellow card) 75'; Pardo 86'	Stadium: Arke Stadion; Attendance: 13.250; Referee: Haverkort

21 December 2003 16	RKC Waalwijk	0 – 0	Feyenoord	Waalwijk
14:30 CEST		report	Gyan (yellow card) 4'	Stadium: Mandemakers Stadion; Attendance: 6.500; Referee: van Hulten

25 January 2004 17	Feyenoord	3 – 2	FC Utrecht	Rotterdam
14:30 CEST	Paauwe (yellow card) 48'; Buffel 27'; Lazović 77', 81'	report	Tanghe 22'; Leitoe 26'; de Jong (yellow card) 56'; Touzani (red card) 78'; Kruys (yellow card) 90'	Stadium: De Kuip; Attendance: 39.800; Referee: Temmink

28 January 2004 18	NEC Nijmegen	1 – 2	Feyenoord	Nijmegen
20:00 CEST	Niedzielan 22'; Simr (yellow card) 56'	report	Pardo (yellow card) 19'; Kuyt 48'; Buffel (yellow card) 41' (goal) 57'	Stadium: De Goffert; Attendance: 12.500; Referee: Jol

1 February 2004 19	Feyenoord	3 – 2	FC Twente	Rotterdam
12:30 CEST	Buffel 10', 68'; Kuyt 36'	report	Heubach (yellow card) 64'; Polak 77' (pen.); Zomer 90'	Stadium: De Kuip; Attendance: 42.000; Referee: van Egmond

8 February 2004 20	Vitesse Arnhem	0 – 0	Feyenoord	Arnhem
14:30 CEST		report		Stadium: Gelredome; Attendance: 18.750; Referee: Haverkort

11 February 2004 21	Feyenoord	0 – 3	AZ Alkmaar	Rotterdam
20:00 CEST		report	Perez 23'; Elkhattabi 47'; Landzaat 67' (pen.); Huysegems (yellow card) 75'; Opdam (yellow card) 85'	Stadium: De Kuip; Attendance: 41.500; Referee: Bossen

15 February 2004 22	ADO Den Haag	2 – 2	Feyenoord	The Hague
12:30 CEST	Saavedra (yellow card) 11'; Castelen 19'; Toda (yellow card) 42'; van der Gun 83'; Saeijs (yellow card) 90'	report	van Persie 37' (yellow card) 75'; Gyan (red card) 38'; Buffel 45' (yellow card) 73'	Stadium: Zuiderpark Stadion; Attendance: 8.083; Referee: van Hulten

29 February 2004 23	Willem II	0 – 3	Feyenoord	Tilburg
14:30 CEST	Shoukov (yellow card) 55'; van Mosselveld (yellow card) 74'	report	Ghaly (yellow card) 9'; Paauwe (yellow card) 18'; Lurling 60'; Song 70'; Mtiliga (yellow card) 73'; Smolarek 84'	Stadium: Koning Willem II Stadion; Attendance: 14.000; Referee: Vink

7 March 2004 24	Feyenoord	2 – 2	SC Heerenveen	Rotterdam
14:30 CEST	Pardo (yellow card) 11'; Lurling (yellow card) 19'; Schreuder (yellow card) 61'; Buffel 75', 82'	report	Selaković 11' (pen.); Seip (yellow card) 20'; Väyrynen (yellow card) 22'; Knopper 67'	Stadium: De Kuip; Attendance: 46.300; Referee: van Egmond

14 March 2004 25	PSV Eindhoven	0 – 1	Feyenoord	Eindhoven
12:30 CEST		report	Smolarek 13'; Ono (yellow card) 28'; Paauwe (yellow card) 48'	Stadium: Philips Stadion; Attendance: 35.000; Referee: Jol

21 March 2004 26	Feyenoord	1 – 0	RKC Waalwijk	Rotterdam
12:30 CEST	Kuyt 6'; Smolarek (yellow card) 18'	report	Greene (yellow card) 81'; Boulahrouz (yellow card) 90'	Stadium: De Kuip; Attendance: 40.000; Referee: Sterk

28 March 2004 27	Feyenoord	3 – 0	Roda JC	Rotterdam
14:30 CEST	Buffel 17'; Kuyt 57' (pen.); Mtiliga (yellow card) 62'; Smolarek 75'	report	Brouwers (yellow card) 57'; Senden (yellow card) 66'	Stadium: De Kuip; Attendance: 42.500; Referee: van Hulten

4 April 2004 28	NAC Breda	0 – 3	Feyenoord	Breda
12:30 CEST	Barakat (yellow card) 69'	report	van den Berg 51'; Buffel 66', 73'; Lurling (yellow card) 70'; Song (yellow card) 54' (yellow card) 75' (red card)	Stadium: Rat Verlegh Stadion; Attendance: 15.900; Referee: Temmink

11 April 2004 29	Feyenoord	1 – 1	Ajax	Rotterdam
12:30 CEST	Kuyt (yellow card) 72' (goal) 89'	report	Pienaar (yellow card) 38'; Ibrahimović 68'; van der Vaart (yellow card) 72'	Stadium: De Kuip; Attendance: 43.000; Referee: Jol

18 April 2004 30	FC Utrecht	0 – 3	Feyenoord	Utrecht
12:30 CEST	van de Haar (yellow card) 53'; van den Bergh (yellow card) 77'	report	Paauwe (yellow card) 35'; Smolarek 52', 76'; Kuyt 63'	Stadium: Stadion Galgenwaard; Attendance: 18.000; Referee: Luinge

25 April 2004 31	Feyenoord	2 – 0	FC Volendam	Rotterdam
14:30 CEST	Smolarek 44' (yellow card) 56'; Kuyt 75' (pen.)	report		Stadium: De Kuip; Attendance: 42.000; Referee: van Egmond

2 May 2004 32	Feyenoord	1 – 2	FC Groningen	Rotterdam
14:30 CEST	Kuyt 56'	report	Matthijs (yellow card) 52'; Schoenmakers (yellow card) 63' (yellow card) 88' (red card); Drent 87', 89'; Kruiswijk (yellow card) 90'	Stadium: De Kuip; Attendance: 39.600; Referee: Wiedemeijer

9 May 2004 33	RBC Roosendaal	1 – 4	Feyenoord	Roosendaal
14:30 CEST	Youssouf 20'	report	Kuyt 18'; Buffel 36'; Paauwe 74'; Smolarek 80'	Stadium: Vast & Goed Stadion; Attendance: 4.980; Referee: Vink

16 May 2004 34	Feyenoord	7 – 1	PEC Zwolle	Rotterdam
14:30 CEST	Lazović 2', 10', 81'; Kuyt 17', 28', 79'; Buffel (yellow card) 33'; Paauwe 50'	report	Lim-Duan 62'	Stadium: De Kuip; Attendance: 44.000; Referee: Temmink

=== KNVB Cup ===
17 December 2003 Round of 16	Feyenoord	1 – 0	Vitesse Arnhem	Rotterdam
	Lurling 36'	report		Stadium: De Kuip; Attendance: 15.000; Referee: unknown

4 February 2004 1/4 Final	FC Twente	3 – 1 (a.e.t.)	Feyenoord	Enschede
	N'Kufo 21'; Sibum 115'; Christensen 117'	report	Kuyt 30'	Stadium: Arke Stadion; Attendance: unknown Referee: unknown

=== UEFA Cup ===
25 September 2003 1st Round	Feyenoord	2 – 1	(Austria) FC Kärnten	(Netherlands) Rotterdam
20:30 CEST	Kuyt 63'; Paauwe (yellow card) 71'; Buffel 76'	report	Marić 56' (yellow card) 68'	Stadium: De Kuip; Attendance: 25.000; Referee: (Scotland) Clark; Assistant referees: (Scotland) Davis (Scotland) Murphy; Fourth official: (Scotland) Richmond

16 October 2003 1st Round	FC Kärnten (Austria)	0 – 1 (1 – 3 agg.)	Feyenoord	(Austria) Klagenfurt
20:30 CEST	Jovanovic (yellow card) 43'; Kabat (yellow card) 85'; Schellander (yellow card) 90'	report	Buffel 14'; Acuña (yellow card) 37'	Stadium: Wortherseestadion; Attendance: 10.000; Referee: (Cyprus) Loizou; Assistant referees: (Cyprus) Platis (Cyprus) Papamichael; Fourth official: (Cyprus) Papoutsos

6 November 2003 2nd Round	Feyenoord	0 – 2	(Czech Republic) FK Teplice	(Netherlands) Rotterdam
20:45 CEST	Swerts (red card) 2'	report	Doležal 3'; Rezek 52'; Lengyel (yellow card) 60'; Hunal (yellow card) 80'	Stadium: De Kuip; Attendance: 27.000; Referee: (Greece) Briakos; Assistant referees: (Greece) Ofidis (Greece) Bozatzidis; Fourth official: (Greece) unknown

27 November 2003 2nd Round	FK Teplice (Czech Republic)	1 – 1 (3 – 1 agg.)	Feyenoord	(Czech Republic) Teplice
18:00 CEST	Horváth 40' (pen.) (yellow card) 52'; Leitner (yellow card) 90'	report	Snoyl (yellow card) 31' (goal) 36'; Schreuder (yellow card) 54'	Stadium: Na Stínadlech; Attendance: 10.000; Referee: (France) Layec; Assistant referees: (France) Harribey (France) Faye; Fourth official: (France) unknown

=== Friendlies ===
3 June 2003 Asia Tour / Saitama City Cup	Urawa Red Diamonds (Japan)	2 – 2	Feyenoord	(Japan) Saitama
	Tanaka 61'; Emerson 62'		Bombarda 17' 57'	Stadium: Saitama Stadium 2002, Attendance: 52,247 referee = unknown

6 June 2003 Asia Tour	Busan IPark (South Korea)	4 – 1	Feyenoord	(South Korea) Busan
	Zoran Urumov; Zoran Urumov; Hwang Chul-mim; Lee Jang-kwan	News Article	van Persie	Stadium: Busan Asiad Stadium; Attendance: 6,0000; Referee: unknown

12 July 2003	Excelsior Maassluis	0 – 5	Feyenoord	Maassluis
		report	Lurling 33'; van Persie 37', 68'; Elmander 46'; Bosvelt 77'	Stadium: Sportpark Lavendelstraat; Attendance: unknown Referee: van der Hilst

15 July 2003 Alpencup 1/2 Final	Hannover 96 (Germany)	1 – 0	Feyenoord	(Austria) Innsbruck
	de Guzman 30'	report		Stadium: Tivoli Neu; Attendance: unknown Referee: unknown

16 July 2003 Alpencup 3rd place match	1. FC Nürnberg (Germany)	2 – 0	Feyenoord	(Austria) Innsbruck
19:15 CEST	Nikl 43'; Krzynówek 82'	report		Stadium: Tivoli Neu; Attendance: unknown Referee: unknown

18 July 2003	Regional Selection Kitbühel/Kufstein (Austria)	0 – 7	Feyenoord	(Austria) Kitzbühel
		report	Elmander 21'; Bombarda 30', 48'; Dondé 34'; Lurling 38', 80'; Kuyt 88'	Stadium: unknown Attendance: unknown Referee: unknown

25 July 2003	Manchester City F.C. (England)	2 – 1	Feyenoord	(Denmark) Aarhus
	Anelka 29'; Wanchope 89'	report	Lazović 23'	Stadium: NRGi Park; Attendance: unknown Referee: unknown

29 July 2003	Zwart-Wit '28	0 – 6	Feyenoord	Rotterdam
		report	van Persie 12'; Buffel 14', 24', 40'; Lazović 51'; Elmander 80'	Stadium: Sportpark de Vaan; Attendance: unknown Referee: unknown

2 August 2003	Feyenoord	0 – 1	(Spain) Celta de Vigo	Rotterdam
	van den Berg (yellow card)	report	Edu 3'	Stadium: De Kuip; Attendance: unknown Referee: Jol

5 August 2003	RVVH	0 – 7	Feyenoord	Ridderkerk
		report	Elmander 1'; Buffel 38'; Kuyt 58' (pen.); Lazović 67', 69', 74', 89'	Stadium: Sportpark Ridderkerk; Attendance: unknown Referee: unknown

9 August 2003	Portsmouth F.C. (England)	2 – 0	Feyenoord	(England) Portsmouth
	Berger 40'; Yakubu 83'	report		Stadium: Fratton Park; Attendance: unknown Referee: (England) Gallagher

12 August 2003	Voorschoten '97	0 – 3	Feyenoord	Voorschoten
		report	Kuyt 27'; de Nooijer 75'; Pardo 84'	Stadium: Sportpark Adegeest; Attendance: 5.500; Referee: Schaap

11 January 2004	Feyenoord	2 – 1	(Belgium) Club Brugge	(Turkey) Antalya
18:00 CEST	Smolarek 37'; Pardo 55'	report	Sæternes 2'	Stadium: Wow-Hotel Complex; Attendance: unknown Referee: unknown

14 January 2004	Feyenoord	2 – 1	(Turkey) Beşiktaş	(Turkey) Antalya
18:00 CEST	Buffel 59'; Lazović 90'	report	Sergen 79'	Stadium: Wow-Hotel Complex; Attendance: unknown Referee: unknown

18 January 2004	Feyenoord	1 – 0	SBV Excelsior	Rotterdam
	Paauwe 60'	report		Stadium: De Kuip; Attendance: 40.000; Referee: van der Hilst

22 January 2004	Delta Sport	1 – 14	Feyenoord	Vlaardingen
	Korczak 8'	report	Smolarek 7', 48', 74'; Lazović 16', 25', 65', 69'; Schreuder 39'; van Persie 45', 57', 78'; Kuyt 71', 83', 90' (pen.)	Stadium: Sportpark De Broekpolder; Attendance: unknown Referee: unknown
