= 2004–05 Feyenoord season =

Feyenoord
2004-05 season
- Manager: Ruud Gullit
- Stadium: De Kuip
- Eredivisie: 4th (qualified for UEFA Cup)
- Amstel Cup: 1/2 Final
- UEFA Cup: Last 32
- Top goalscorer: League: Dirk Kuyt (29); All: Dirk Kuyt (36)
Home colours	Away colours

During the 2004–05 Dutch football season, Feyenoord competed in the Eredivisie.

== Season summary ==
Feyenoord were the Eredivisie's top scorers but they did not improve on last's seasons results and finished 4th, way off challenging for the title. The club made it to the semi-finals in the domestic KNVB cup, losing to the winner of the KNVB Cup PSV Eindhoven after penalties. In the UEFA cup they made it to the 3rd round (last 32 clubs) losing to the later finalist Sporting CP from Portugal.

== Kits ==
Feyenoord's kits were manufactured by Italian company Kappa and sponsored by Belgian financial company Fortis.

== Squad ==
Squad at end of season
In () brackets where they came from.

Note: Flags indicate national team as defined under FIFA eligibility rules; some limited exceptions apply. Players may hold more than one non-FIFA nationality.

No.	Pos.	Nation	Player
1	GK	HUN	Gabor Babos (from (Netherlands) NAC Breda)
2	DF	SWE	Alexander Östlund (from (Sweden) Hammarby Fotboll)
3	DF	TUN	Karim Saidi (from (Tunisia) Club Africain)
4	DF	BRA	André Bahia (from (Brazil) Flamengo)
5	DF	NED	Pascal Bosschaart (from (Netherlands) FC Utrecht)
6	MF	EGY	Hossam Ghaly
7	FW	NED	Dirk Kuyt
8	MF	JPN	Shinji Ono
9	FW	SCG	Danko Lazović
10	MF	NED	Nicky Hofs (from (Netherlands) Vitesse Arnhem)
11	MF	BEL	Bart Goor (from (Germany) Hertha BSC)
14	MF	CHI	Sebastián Pardo
15	DF	DEN	Patrick Mtiliga
17	DF	NED	Patrick Paauwe
19	DF	GHA	Christian Gyan
20	MF	BRA	Leonardo
21	FW	CIV	Salomon Kalou
22	MF	BRA	Gerson Magrao (from (Brazil) Cruzeiro Esporte Clube)
23	GK	POL	Zbigniew Małkowski
24	MF	NED	Edwin de Graaf (from (Netherlands) RBC Roosendaal)
25	DF	USA	Cory Gibbs (from (United States) FC Dallas)
26	DF	POR	Bruno Basto (from (France) Girondins Bordeaux)
28	MF	NED	Romeo Castelen (from (Netherlands) ADO Den Haag (Note: Castelen was born in Paramaribo, Suriname, but also qualified to represent the Netherlands internationally and made his international debut for the Netherlands in August 2004.))
29	DF	BUL	Ivan Bandalovski
29	MF	NED	Tim Vincken
30	GK	NED	Patrick Lodewijks
31	DF	NED	Gianni Zuiverloon
35	MF	NED	Diego Biseswar

=== Left club during season ===
Note: Flags indicate national team as defined under FIFA eligibility rules; some limited exceptions apply. Players may hold more than one non-FIFA nationality.

No.	Pos.	Nation	Player
2	DF	KOR	Chong-Guk Song (to (South Korea) Suwon Samsung Bluewings)
4	DF	NED	Peter van den Berg (to (Netherlands) Vitesse Arnhem)
10	FW	BEL	Thomas Buffel (to (Scotland) Rangers)
16	FW	POL	Ebi Smolarek (on loan to (Germany) Borussia Dortmund)
18	DF	NED	Glenn Loovens (on loan to (Netherlands) De Graafschap)
22	MF	NED	Alfred Schreuder (on loan to (Netherlands) RKC Waalwijk)
24	MF	CHI	Jorge Acuña (on loan to (Chile) CD Universidad Católica)
25	DF	BRA	Jean Carlos Dondé (on loan to (Germany) Hamburger SV)
27	DF	NED	Ramon van Haaren (on loan to (Netherlands) Sparta Rotterdam)
29	FW	NED	Anthony Lurling (on loan to (Netherlands) NAC Breda)

=== Left club at the end of previous season ===
Note: Flags indicate national team as defined under FIFA eligibility rules; some limited exceptions apply. Players may hold more than one non-FIFA nationality.

No.	Pos.	Nation	Player
—	FW	ARG	Mariano Bombarda (to (Spain) CD Tenerife)
—	DF	NED	Gerard de Nooijer (to (Netherlands) FC Dordrecht)
—	FW	NED	Robin van Persie (to (England) Arsenal F.C.)
—	GK	NED	Edwin Zoetebier (to (Netherlands) PSV Eindhoven)
—	DF	NED	Ramon van Haaren (on loan to (Netherlands) Sparta Rotterdam)
—	MF	NED	Anthony Lurling (on loan to (Netherlands) NAC Breda)
—	MF	NED	Alfred Schreuder (on loan to (Netherlands) RKC Waalwijk)
—	MF	BEL	Gill Swerts (on loan to (Netherlands) ADO Den Haag)
—	DF	NED	Kees van Wonderen (stopped)

== Results ==
=== Eredivisie ===
15 August 2004 1	Feyenoord	6 – 1	De Graafschap	Rotterdam
14:30 CEST	Kuyt 9', 37', 51'; Castelen 53', 58'; Kalou 73'	report	Ax (yellow card) 11'; van Beukering 45'; Berck Beelenkamp (yellow card) 72'; van Leerdam (yellow card) 90'	Stadium: De Kuip; Attendance: 40.400; Referee: van Hulten

22 August 2004 2	Willem II	0 – 4	Feyenoord	Tilburg
12:30 CEST		report	Kalou 39'; Ono 54'; Ghaly 74'; Kuyt 90'	Stadium: Koning Willem II Stadion; Attendance: 12.700; Referee: van Egmond

29 August 2004 3	Vitesse	1 – 1	Feyenoord	Arnhem
12:30 CEST	Fränkel (yellow card) 23'; Dingsdag (yellow card) 33' (goal) 84'; Vreven (yellow card) 42'; Janssen (yellow card) 48'	report	Saïdi 24'; Smolarek (yellow card) 34'; Paauwe (yellow card) 78'	Stadium: Gelredome; Attendance: 17.417; Referee: Temmink

12 September 2004 4	Feyenoord	3 – 1	FC Twente	Rotterdam
14:30 CEST	Ono 44'; Kalou 53', 78'	report	Zomer 38'	Stadium: De Kuip; Attendance: 38.000; Referee: Luinge

19 September 2004 5	Feyenoord	0 – 3	FC Utrecht	Rotterdam
12:30 CEST	Bosschaart (yellow card) 51'	report	Schut 31'; Somers 88'; Broerse 90'	Stadium: De Kuip; Attendance: 37.500; Referee: (Belgium) Allaerts

25 September 2004 6	RBC Roosendaal	0 – 4	Feyenoord	Roosendaal
18:30 CEST		report	Salomon Kalou 6', 61'; Goor 33'; Kuyt 66'	Stadium: Vast & Goed Stadion; Attendance: 5000; Referee: Blom

3 October 2004 7	Feyenoord	4 – 2	FC Den Bosch	Rotterdam
14:30 CEST	Kalou 24', 60'; Kuyt 35' (pen.); Castelen 69'	report	Biekman 3'; Biyadat (yellow card) 7'; Haemhouts (yellow card) 11'; Mampaey (yellow card) 34'; van de Laak 83' (pen.)	Stadium: De Kuip; Attendance: 36.500; Referee: Koopman

17 October 2004 8	Roda JC	0 – 2	Feyenoord	Kerkrade
12:30 CEST	Sergio (yellow card) 56'; Brouwers (yellow card) 83'	report	Saidi (yellow card) 4'; Kuyt 60'; Kalou 90'	Stadium: Parkstad Limburg Stadion; Attendance: 14.500; Referee: Luinge

24 October 2004 9	Feyenoord	4 – 0	RKC Waalwijk	Rotterdam
14:30 CEST	Castelen 11'; Goor 66', 86'; Kuyt 70'	report	Hoogendorp (yellow card) 60'	Stadium: De Kuip; Attendance: 40.500; Referee: Vink

31 October 2004 10	AZ	4 – 0	Feyenoord	Alkmaar
12:30 CEST	Mathijsen 4'; Perez 63', 76'; Nelisse 88'	report	Ono (yellow card) 39'; Bosschaart (red card) 78'; Song (red card) 86'	Stadium: Alkmaarderhout; Attendance: 8.475; Referee: van Egmond

7 November 2004 11	Feyenoord	4 – 0	NAC	Rotterdam
14:30 CEST	Kuyt 15'; Ghaly (yellow card) 44'; Goor 46', 90'; Buffel 87'	report	Zonneveld (yellow card) 50'	Stadium: De Kuip; Attendance: 37.200; Referee: Braamhaar

14 November 2004 12	Ajax	1 – 1	Feyenoord	Amsterdam
12:30 CEST	Escudé (yellow card) 19'; Rosales 27'; Sneijder (yellow card) 39'; Boukhari (yellow card) 70'	report	Kuyt 44'; Goor (yellow card) 86'	Stadium: Amsterdam Arena; Attendance: 49.557; Referee: Vink

21 November 2004 13	Feyenoord	1 – 2	FC Groningen	Rotterdam
14:30 CEST	Kuyt 39'; Loovens (yellow card) 63'	report	Nevland 24', 71'	Stadium: De Kuip; Attendance: 40.500; Referee: Haverkort

28 November 2004 14	Heerenveen	2 – 2	Feyenoord	Heerenveen
12:30 CEST	Samaras 74'; Yildirim 86'	report	Buffel 40'; Loovens (yellow card) 59'; Kuyt 71'	Stadium: Abe Lenstra Stadion; Attendance: 17.700; Referee: Bossen

5 December 2004 15	Feyenoord	2 – 1	NEC	Rotterdam
14:30 CEST	Kuyt 19'; Mtiliga (yellow card) 80'; Kalou 85'; Magrao (yellow card) 90'	report	Valencia (yellow card) 21'; Barreto 43'; Wisgerhof (yellow card) 52'	Stadium: De Kuip; Attendance: 36.000; Referee: Wiedemeijer

12 December 2004 16	Feyenoord	3 – 3	PSV	Rotterdam
12:30 CEST	Kalou 49' (yellow card) 73'; Ono 82'; Goor 90'; Bosschaart (yellow card) 90'	report	Cocu 6'; Farfán 24'; Ooijer (yellow card) 32'; Beasley 70'	Stadium: De Kuip; Attendance: 45.000; Referee: Temmink

19 December 2004 17	ADO Den Haag	2 – 0	Feyenoord	The Hague
12:30 CEST	den Ouden 2'; Bodde (yellow card) 60'; Polak 64'	report	Zuiverloon (yellow card) 73'	Stadium: Zuiderpark Stadion; Attendance: 8.000; Referee: Luinge

23 January 2005 18	Feyenoord	1 – 2	Vitesse	Rotterdam
14:30 CEST	Dirk Kuyt 49'; Castelen (yellow card) 88'; Hofs (yellow card) 90'	report	van den Berg (yellow card) 26'; Vreven (yellow card) 48'; Gluščević 81', 83'; Knopper (yellow card) 84'; Janssen (yellow card) 90'	Stadium: De Kuip; Attendance: 39.500; Referee: Braamhaar

29 January 2005 19	FC Twente	0 – 0	Feyenoord	Enschede
19:30 CEST		report		Stadium: Arke Stadion; Attendance: 13.250; Referee: Vink

4 February 2005 20	De Graafschap	2 – 7	Feyenoord	Doetinchem
20:00 CEST	Bot 9'; Bus (yellow card) 38'; van Beukering 85'	report	Kuyt 4', 32', 67'; Gibbs (yellow card) 20'; Castelen 25'; Lazović 47', 52'; Hofs 61'; Basto (yellow card) 70'	Stadium: De Vijverberg; Attendance: 11.000; Referee: Haverkort

13 February 2005 21	Feyenoord	7 – 0	Willem II	Rotterdam
14:30 CEST	Gibbs 23'; Hofs 27', 43', 61'; Kuyt 40' (pen.), 52'; Basto 88'	report	Smit (yellow card) 12'; van Nieuwstadt (yellow card) 40'	Stadium: De Kuip; Attendance: 37.500; Referee: van Sichem

20 February 2005 22	FC Utrecht	0 – 2	Feyenoord	Utrecht
12:30 CEST	Braafheid (yellow card) 55'	report	Castelen 10'; Zuiverloon (yellow card) 21'; Saidi (yellow card) 48'; Kuyt 57'	Stadium: Stadion Galgenwaard; Attendance: 21.500; Referee: Jol

27 February 2005 23	Feyenoord	3 – 0	RBC Roosendaal	Rotterdam
14:30 CEST	Kuyt 25'; Lazović (yellow card) 51'; Kalou (yellow card) 81' (goal) 81'; Ono 83'	report		Stadium: De Kuip; Attendance: 35.000; Referee: Koopman

13 March 2005 25	Feyenoord	4 – 1	Roda JC	Rotterdam
14:30 CEST	Ono 6'; Castelen 23'; Kuyt 70' (pen.); Kalou 85'	report	van Dijk (yellow card) 49'; Östlund 53' (o.g.); Kah (yellow card) 70'	Stadium: De Kuip; Attendance: 39.000; Referee: Vink

19 March 2005 26	RKC Waalwijk	2 – 4	Feyenoord	Waalwijk
19:30 CEST	Vasconcelos 6' (yellow card) 63'; Krohn-Dehli 26'; Greene (red card) 59'	report	Castelen 24', 90'; Kalou 33'; Lazović 90'	Stadium: Mandemakers Stadion; Attendance: 6.500; Referee: van Egmond

3 April 2005 27	Feyenoord	4 – 0	AZ	Rotterdam
14:30 CEST	Kalou 19', 47', 64'; Castelen 43'	report	de Cler (yellow card) 53'; Lindenbergh (yellow card) 75'	Stadium: De Kuip; Attendance: 47.000; Referee: Luinge

10 April 2005 28	NAC	0 – 2	Feyenoord	Breda
12:30 CEST	Lurling (yellow card) 26'; Gudelj (yellow card) 45'	report	Bosschaart (yellow card) 32'; Kalou 43'; Ono 82'; Saidi (yellow card) 83'	Stadium: Rat Verlegh Stadion; Attendance: 15.124; Referee: (Belgium) Vervecken

13 April 2005 24	FC Den Bosch	4 – 1	Feyenoord	Den Bosch
18:00 CEST	Cales 18'; Janssen (yellow card) 66'; van de Laak 74', 78'; Olfers 88'	report	Bahia (yellow card) 13' (goal) 63'; Bosschaart (red card) 17'; Hofs (yellow card) 45'; Ono (yellow card) 54'; Leonardo (yellow card) 87'	Stadium: De Vliert; Attendance: 6.723; Referee: Wiedemeijer

17 April 2005 29	Feyenoord	2 – 3	Ajax	Rotterdam
12:30 CEST	Kalou 48'; Kuyt 80'; de Graaf (yellow card) 81'; Saidi (yellow card) 89'	report	Maxwell (yellow card) 19'; de Jong 57'; Trabelsi (yellow card) 82'; Grygera 86'; Maduro 90'	Stadium: De Kuip; Attendance: 43.000; Referee: Temmink

24 April 2005 30	FC Groningen	0 – 2	Feyenoord	Groningen
12:30 CEST	Drent (yellow card) 38'	report	Bahia 35'; Hofs (yellow card) 37' (goal) 89'	Stadium: Oosterpark Stadion; Attendance: 12.000; Referee: Jol

1 May 2005 31	Feyenoord	1 – 3	Heerenveen	Rotterdam
14:30 CEST	Kuyt 37'; Lazović (red card) 81'	report	Väyrynen 16', 41'; Bakkati (yellow card) 43'; Hansson (yellow card) 51' (goal) 78'	Stadium: De Kuip; Attendance: 41.000; Referee: Luinge

8 May 2005 32	NEC	2 – 0	Feyenoord	Nijmegen
12:30 CEST	Ebbinge (yellow card) 45'; van den Eede 71' (pen.); Niedzielan 86' (yellow card) 87'	report	Babos (yellow card) 70'	Stadium: De Goffert; Attendance: 11.750; Referee: Braamhaar

15 May 2005 33	PSV	4 – 2	Feyenoord	Eindhoven
14:30 CEST	van Bommel (yellow card) 2' (goal) 52'; Afellay 13', 71' (yellow card) 90'; Vennegoor of Hesselink 40'	report	Kuyt 22', 51'; Ono (yellow card) 28'; Goor (yellow card) 35'; Hofs (yellow card) 43'	Stadium: Philips Stadion; Attendance: 33.000; Referee: Haverkort

22 May 2005 34	Feyenoord	6 – 0	ADO Den Haag	Rotterdam
14:30 CEST	Goor 14'; Ono 23'; Kalou 38'; Kuyt 46', 78', 86'	report	Saeijs (yellow card) 71'; den Ouden (yellow card) 74'	Stadium: De Kuip; Attendance: 35.000; Referee: van der Hilst

=== KNVB Cup ===
26 January 2005 Round of 16	AZ	1 – 3	Feyenoord	Alkmaar
	Landzaat 83'; van Galen (red card); Perez (red card)	report	Kuyt 35', 89' (penalty missed); Lazović 40'; Castelen (yellow card)	Stadium: Alkmaarderhout; Attendance: unknown Referee: unknown

3 March 2005 1/4 Final	Feyenoord	4 – 0	NAC	Rotterdam
	Kalou 44', 56'; Kuyt 48', 90'; Basto (yellow card)	report	Diba (yellow card); Risamasu (yellow card)	Stadium: De Kuip; Attendance: unknown Referee: Temmink

20 April 2005 1/2 Final	Feyenoord	1 – 1 (a.e.t.) (2 – 4 p)	PSV	Rotterdam
	Kalou 3'; Hofs (yellow card); de Graaf (yellow card)	report	Beasley 88'; Lucius (yellow card)	Stadium: De Kuip; Attendance: unknown Referee: unknown
	Penalties
	Ono (penalty scored); Goor (penalty missed); Lazović (penalty scored); de Graaf (penalty missed)		van Bommel (penalty scored); Farfán (penalty missed); Park (penalty scored); Robert (penalty scored); Lucius (penalty scored)

=== UEFA Cup ===
16 September 2004 1st Round	ODD Grenland (Norway)	0 – 1	Feyenoord	Skien, Norway
19:00 CEST	Occéan (yellow card) 34'	report	Loovens (yellow card) 56'; Ono 74'	Stadium: Odd Stadion; Attendance: 4.125; Referee: (Poland) Mikulski; Assistant referees: (Poland) Sadzcuk (Poland) Siejka; Fourth official: (Poland) Zyro

30 September 2004 1st Round	Feyenoord	4 – 0	(Norway) ODD Grenland	Rotterdam, Netherlands
20:30 CEST	Bosschaart 5'; Kuyt 45'; Goor 73'; Kalou 90+1'	report	Occéan (yellow card) 49'	Stadium: De Kuip; Attendance: 18.500; Referee: (England) D'Urso; Assistant referees: (England) Bryan (England) East; Fourth official: (England) Knight

21 October 2004 Group Stage Group A	Feyenoord	3 – 0	(Scotland) Heart of Midlothian	Rotterdam, Netherlands
20:05 CEST	Kuyt 22', 83'; Goor 57'; Bosschaart (yellow card) 79'; Mtiliga (yellow card) 89'	report	Pressley (yellow card) 38'; Maybury (yellow card) 79'	Stadium: De Kuip; Attendance: 30.000; Referee: (Denmark) Poulsen; Assistant referees: (Denmark) Larsen (Denmark) Pedersen; Fourth official: (Denmark) Hermansen

4 November 2004 Group Stage Group A	Ferencváros (Hungary)	1 – 1	Feyenoord	Budapest, Hungary
20:45 CEST	Botiș (yellow card) 8'; Kapič (yellow card) 23'; Tözsér 27'; Vukmir (yellow card) 72'	report	Paauwe (yellow card) 26'; Kalou 62'	Stadium: Ferenc Puskás Stadium; Attendance: 25.000; Referee: (Slovenia) Čeferin; Assistant referees: (Slovenia) Zupancic (Slovenia) Kokolj; Fourth official: (Slovenia) Kandare

1 December 2004 Group Stage Group A	Feyenoord	2 – 1	(Germany) Schalke 04	Rotterdam, Netherlands
20:45 CEST	Goor (yellow card) 19'; Kalou 32', 40'; Bosschaart (yellow card) 35'; Ghaly (yellow card) 61'	report	Hanke 6'; Krstajić (yellow card) 14'	Stadium: De Kuip; Attendance: 48.000; Referee: (England) Messias; Assistant referees: (England) Turner (England) Drysdale; Fourth official: (England) Rennie

16 December 2004 Group Stage Group A	FC Basel (Switzerland)	1 – 0	Feyenoord	Basel, Switzerland
20:45 CEST	Carignano 53'	report	Smolarek (yellow card) 78'; Bosschaart (yellow card) 89'	Stadium: St. Jakob-Park; Attendance: 26.876; Referee: (Spain) Davila; Assistant referees: (Spain) Yuste (Spain) Rozas; Fourth official: (Spain) Pérez Lasa

16 February 2005 Round of 32	Sporting CP (Portugal)	2 – 1	Feyenoord	Lisbon, Portugal
22:15 CEST	Custódio 22' (yellow card) 65' (yellow-red card); Rogério (yellow card) 37'; Liédson 36'	report	Goor 11' (yellow card) 57'; Paauwe (yellow card) 56'; Hofs (yellow card) 80'	Stadium: Estadio Jose Alvalade; Attendance: 19.091; Referee: (Austria) Meßner; Assistant referees: (Austria) Krenn (Austria) Mayr; Fourth official: (Austria) Sowa

24 February 2005 Round of 32	Feyenoord	1 – 2	(Portugal) Sporting CP	Rotterdam, Netherlands
22:15 CEST	Hofs (yellow card) 59' (goal) 89'	report	Liédson 62'; Rochemback 83'	Stadium: De Kuip; Attendance: 35.000; Referee: (Germany) Meyer; Assistant referees: (Germany) Kadach (Germany) Glindermann; Fourth official: (Germany) Gagelmann

=== Friendlies ===
9 July 2004	ASWH	0 – 9	Feyenoord	Hendrik-Ido-Ambacht
		report	Buffel 38', 90'; Goor 48'; Kuyt 49', 74'; Smolarek 60', 76', 84'; Song 66'	Stadium: Sportpark Schildman; Attendance: unknown Referee: unknown

12 July 2004	DVS '33	0 – 5	Feyenoord	Ermelo
		report	Kuyt 5', 61'; Buffel 23'; Paauwe 25'; Castelen 90'	Stadium: Sportcomplex Sportlaan; Attendance: unknown Referee: unknown

15 July 2004	VV Katwijk	0 – 5	Feyenoord	Katwijk
		report	Lazović 20'; Kuyt 28', 76', 79'; Castelen 67'	Stadium: Sportpark de Krom; Attendance: unknown Referee: unknown

20 July 2004 Alpen Cup 1/2 Final	Feyenoord	4 – 2	(Germany) Arminia Bielefeld	(Germany) Weiler
	Ghaly 6'; Lazović 22'; Kuyt 49'; Kalou 75'	report	Küntzel 23'; Borges 67'	Stadium: unknown Attendance: unknown Referee: unknown

22 July 2004 Alpen Cup Final	Partizan Belgrade (Serbia and Montenegro)	1 – 0	Feyenoord	(Germany) Weiler
	Radović 32'	report		Stadium: unknown Attendance: unknown Referee: unknown

27 July 2004	SC Doesburg	0 – 14	Feyenoord	Doesburg
		report	Goor 11', 51', 76'; Kalou 19'; Kuyt 22', 27', 36', 43' (pen.); Ono 42'; Pardo 50'; Lazović 55'; Saidi 56'; Buffel 80', 88'	Stadium: Sportpark Oranjesingel; Attendance: unknown Referee: unknown

31 July 2004 Gateshead Cup 1/2 Final	Feyenoord	1 – 1 (3 – 4 p)	(Portugal) Sporting CP	(England) Newcastle
	Kuyt 56'	report	Pinto 39'	Stadium: St. James' Park; Attendance: unknown Referee: unknown
	Penalties
	Kuyt (penalty missed); Lazović (penalty scored); Magrao (penalty scored); Smolarek (penalty missed); Ono (penalty scored)		Tello (penalty missed); Rogerio (penalty scored); Polga (penalty scored); Niculae (penalty scored); Beto (penalty scored)

1 August 2004 Gateshead Cup 3rd place match	Feyenoord	0 – 0 (7 – 8 p)	(Scotland) Glasgow Rangers	(England) Newcastle
		report		Stadium: St. James' Park; Attendance: unknown Referee: unknown
	Penalties
	Lazović (penalty scored); Goor (penalty scored); Paauwe (penalty scored); Pardo (penalty scored); Ono (penalty scored); van den Berg (penalty scored); Kalou (penalty missed); Castelen (penalty scored); Zuiverloon (penalty missed)		McCormack (penalty scored); Mladenović (penalty scored); Novo (penalty scored); Rae (penalty scored); Vanoli (penalty scored); Ross (penalty scored); Khizanishvili (penalty missed); Hutton (penalty scored); Hughes (penalty scored)

3 August 2004 Kappa Cup 1/2 Final	Feyenoord	2 – 1	(England) Tottenham Hotspur	(Spain) Sevilla
	Kuyt 39', 69'	report	Kanoute 27'	Stadium: Estadio de La Cartuja; Attendance: unknown Referee: unknown

5 August 2004 Final	Real Betis (Spain)	1 – 1 (2 – 3 p)	Feyenoord	(Spain) Sevilla
	Assunção 23'	report	Lazović 48'	Stadium: Estadio de La Cartuja; Attendance: unknown Referee: unknown
	Penalties
	Assunção (penalty scored); Oliveira (penalty scored); Dani (penalty missed)		Magrao (penalty scored); Pardo (penalty scored); Buffel (penalty scored)

8 August 2004	Feyenoord	2 – 2	(England) Fulham	Rotterdam
	Kuyt 5', 45' (pen.)	report	Radzinski 21'; Jensen 49'	Stadium: De Kuip; Attendance: unknown Referee: unknown

10 August 2004	SVVSMC	0 – 3	Feyenoord	Schiedam
		report	Lazović 33', 57'; Kalou 83'	Stadium: Sportpark Harga; Attendance: unknown Referee: unknown
