= Danny Buijs =

Dutch footballer and manager

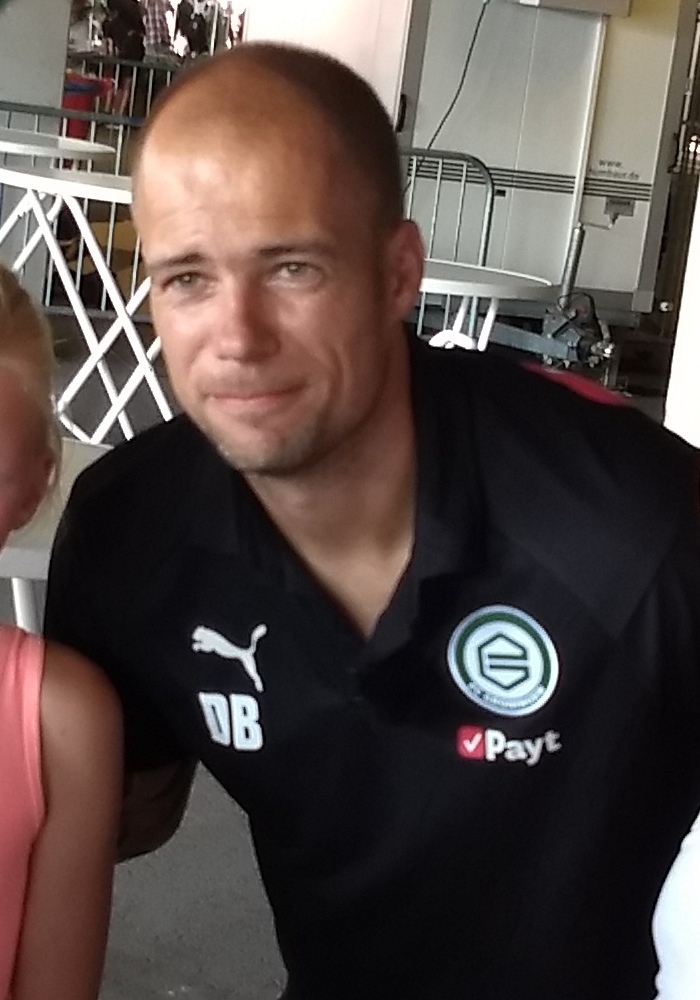
- Buijs as head coach of Groningen in 2018

Personal information
- Date of birth: 21 June 1982 (age 44)
- Place of birth: Dordrecht, Netherlands
- Height: 1.82 m (6 ft 0 in)
- Positions: Right-back; defensive midfielder

Youth career
- vv Alblasserdam
- Feyenoord

Senior career*
Years	Team	Apps	(Gls)
2001–2004	Excelsior	64	(9)
2004–2006	Groningen	67	(8)
2006–2009	Feyenoord	51	(6)
2009–2011	ADO Den Haag	53	(7)
2011–2012	Kilmarnock	14	(0)
2012–2013	Sparta	12	(1)
2013–2014	Kozakken Boys	17	(5)
Total		278	(36)

Managerial career
- 2016–2018: Kozakken Boys
- 2018–2022: Groningen
- 2022: KV Mechelen
- 2023–: Fortuna Sittard
- * Club domestic league appearances and goals

Danny Buijs (born 21 June 1982) is a Dutch professional football manager and former player. He is the head coach of Eredivisie club Fortuna Sittard in the Netherlands.

== Early life ==
Buijs was born in Dordrecht and raised in Alblasserdam. When he was six years old he joined local amateur side VV Alblasserdam where his father and uncle played in the first team, while his grandfather was a staff member. When he was nine years old his VV Alblasserdam team faced Strijen, the team where Geert Meijer's son played. Meijer was assistant manager of Feyenoord in these days and was impressed by Buijs' skills that match and offered him a trial at Feyenoord. The trial was a success and Buijs joined Feyenoord's youth system.

== Club career ==
=== Early career ===
In total he would play ten years at Varkenoord, Feyenoord's youth complex. His development from team to team went without any trouble and his team featured about seven times in a pre-match in De Kuip. When he reached the A-level status in youth football he played in Feyenoord's A1 team on Saturdays and in Sportclub Feijenoord's (Feyenoord amateur side) team in the Hoofdklasse for about half a season. His time in the A1 team was a successful period and under manager Henk van Stee they became the Dutch national champions twice. They also won all international events they participated in. Buijs was a regular goalscorer, was captain of the team and was able to train with the first team squad every now and then. He also joined the first team squad to friendly matches against amateur sides.

=== Feyenoord and Excelsior ===
When Buijs came closer to his debut in professional football he realised that he was still skilled enough to compete with Brett Emerton for his right back position and he asked the Feyenoord staff whether he could move to Feyenoord's satellite club Excelsior on loan. At first Feyenoord did not want to cooperate as they positioned him in their second team, but 6 months later he eventually was allowed to go. Excelsior played in the Eerste Divisie and were contenders for the title.

On 8 March 2002 Buijs made his professional debut in Excelsior's 3–0 home win over Cambuur Leeuwarden. They did not become the league champions but gained promotion to the Eredivisie through the promotion play-offs at the end of the season. In the Eredivisie he was a first team regular for Excelsior, but they struggled to compete with the other teams and relegated back into the Eerste Divisie straight away. Buijs almost moved to Sparta Rotterdam as Henk van Stee almost became their manager, but when he eventually became Excelsior's new manager he decided to stay and play another year on Eerste Divisie level. That year Excelsior lost the title on the last matchday of the season and they were unable to win promotion through the promotion play-offs as well. Feyenoord wanted to extend his contract, but for the same salary as he already received from his first professional contract. Other teams that showed interest were Vitesse Arnhem, Roda JC and FC Groningen. Eventually he decided to sign a contract with FC Groningen and leave Feyenoord.

=== FC Groningen ===
At FC Groningen he had a successful period. When he came to the club he said in an interview he wanted to achieve European football at his new club. Nobody took his words serious and Martin Drent even asked him if he was nuts. He started as a right back with Kurt Elshot as the right midfielder. This did not turn out to be a success and due to several injuries Buijs eventually became a defensive midfielder and the following season he exclusively played as a right midfielder. In this season FC Groningen qualified for the UEFA Cup in the 2006–07 season. Buijs started that season at FC Groningen, played two Eredivisie matches and his efforts at Groningen earned him a transfer back to his beloved Feyenoord.

=== Return to Feyenoord ===
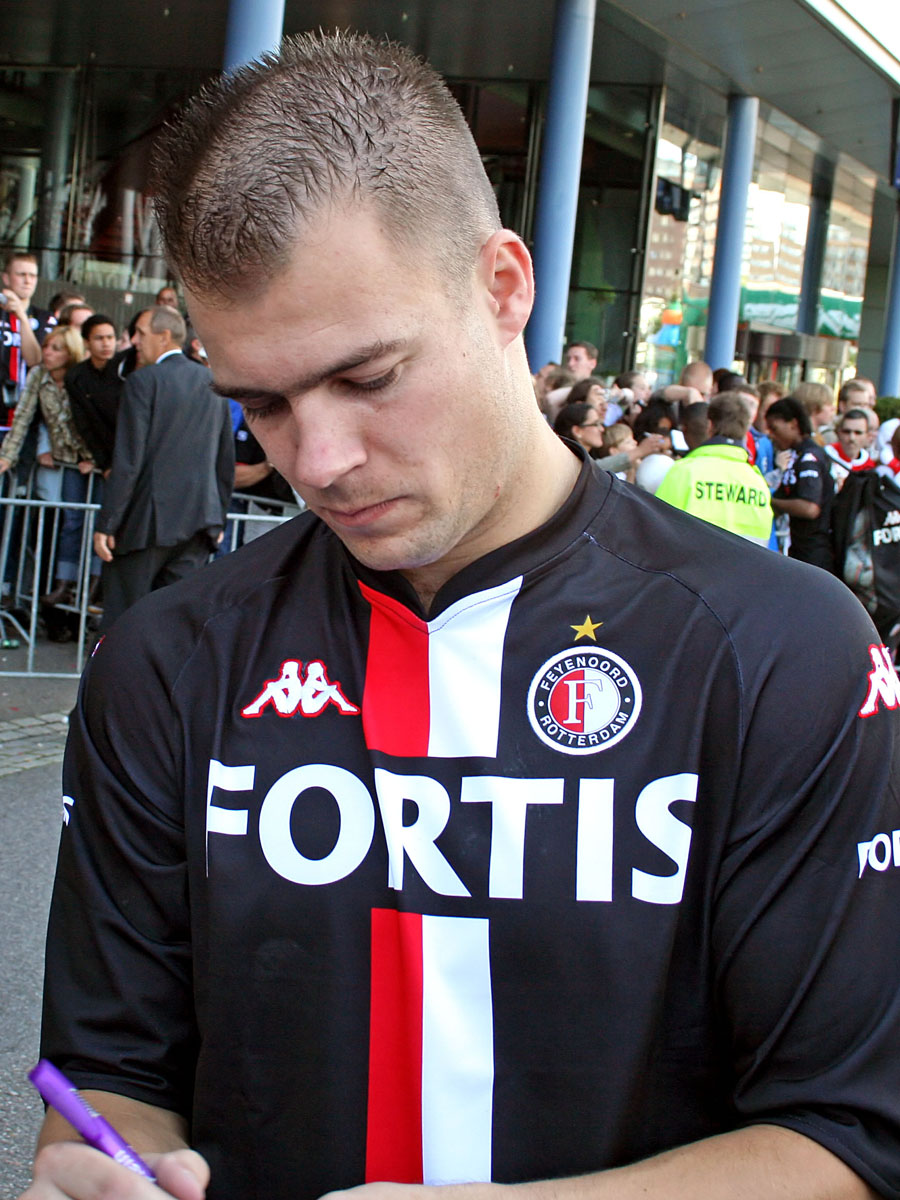
Buijs with Feyenoord in 2007

He had always said that if Feyenoord wanted to have him back he would return there. Buijs had been a member of Het Legioen himself for 10 years and has an intense relationship with the fans at the club. His first season since his return was no success as Feyenoord finished on the seventh position in the Eredivisie and missed out on European football for the first time in many years. Buijs was often criticised in the media, but for the fans he is still one of the most popular players at the club.

=== ADO Den Haag ===
In the summer of 2009, Buijs joined ADO Den Haag, after already being on loan with the team for half a season. He signed a contract for two years. However, ADO Den Haag struggled in the Eredivisie in Bujis first season there and, on 14 April 2010, English Football League Championship side Derby County announced they had agreed a deal to sign Buijs for the start of the 2010–11 season. They pulled out of the deal, however, following the signing of Crewe Alexandra's John Brayford.

=== Kilmarnock ===
On 1 July 2011, Buijs signed a one-year deal with Scottish Premier League club Kilmarnock. Buijs made his debut in a 0–0 draw against Motherwell at Rugby Park on Saturday 30 July 2011. On 18 March, Buijs played in the 2012 Scottish League Cup Final which Kilmarnock won after beating Celtic 1–0. Buijs started the game and was substituted for Lee Johnson after 20 minutes due to an injury.

=== Sparta Rotterdam ===
In the summer of 2012, Buijs signed a one-year deal with Sparta Rotterdam.

== Coaching career ==
On 1 June 2022, Buijs was hired by Belgian club Mechelen. On 17 October 2022 he was sacked and replaced by assistant Steven Defour.

== Managerial statistics ==
As of match played 15 May 2022

Managerial record by team and tenure
Team	Nat	From	To	Record								Ref
Team	Nat	From	To	G	W	D	L	GF	GA	GD	Win %	Ref
Kozakken Boys	(Netherlands)	1 July 2016	28 May 2018	72	39	14	19	151	98	+53	54.17	
Groningen	(Netherlands)	28 May 2018	Present	138	50	28	60	162	174	−12	36.23	
Total				210	89	42	79	313	272	+41	42.38	—

== Honours ==
Feyenoord

- KNVB Cup: 2007–08

Kilmarnock

- Scottish League Cup: 2012
