= 2003 Johan Cruyff Shield =

Johan Cruijff Schaal VIII
PSV Eindhoven	FC Utrecht
3	1
- Date: 10 August 2003
- Venue: Amsterdam Arena, Amsterdam
- Referee: Ben Haverkort
- Attendance: 30,000

The eighth edition of the Johan Cruyff Shield (Dutch: Johan Cruijff Schaal) was held on 10 August 2003 between 2002–03 Eredivisie champions PSV Eindhoven and 2002–03 KNVB Cup winners FC Utrecht. PSV won the match 3–1.

== Match details ==
10 August 2003

PSV Eindhoven	3–1	FC Utrecht
Robben 14'; Van Bommel 47'; Kežman 88'		Van de Haar 21'

Amsterdam Arena, Amsterdam
Attendance: 30,000
Referee: Ben Haverkort

PSV Eindhoven	FC Utrecht

GK	23	(Netherlands) Ronald Waterreus
RB	30	(Denmark) Kasper Bøgelund	(substituted off) 46'
CB	20	(Netherlands) Jürgen Colin
CB	29	(Netherlands) Kevin Hofland
LB	3	(South Korea) Lee Young-pyo
RM	19	(Denmark) Dennis Rommedahl	(substituted off) 83'
CM	6	(Netherlands) Mark van Bommel (c)
CM	14	(Switzerland) Johann Vogel	(substituted off) 86'
LM	11	(Netherlands) Arjen Robben
SS	7	(South Korea) Park Ji-sung
CF	9	(Serbia and Montenegro) Mateja Kežman
Substitutes:
MF	25	(Netherlands) John de Jong	(substituted in) 46'
MF	22	(Netherlands) Jordi Hoogstrate	(substituted in) 83'
MF	13	(Netherlands) Remco van der Schaaf	(substituted in) 86'
Manager:
(Netherlands) Guus Hiddink

GK	12	(Netherlands) René Ponk (c)
RB	2	(Netherlands) Michael Lamey	(yellow card) 32'
CB	19	(Netherlands) Bas van den Brink	(yellow card) 55'
CB	22	(Netherlands) Sander Keller		(substituted off) 60'
CB	4	(Netherlands) Patrick Zwaanswijk
LB	5	(Netherlands) Pascal Bosschaart
CM	3	(Netherlands) Jordy Zuidam		(substituted off) 77'
CM	14	(Netherlands) Joost Broerse
AM	10	(Belgium) Stefaan Tanghe
CF	9	(Netherlands) Hans van de Haar		(substituted off) 83'
CF	18	(Netherlands) Donny de Groot
Substitutes:
FW	31	(Netherlands) Richal Leitoe		(substituted in) 60'
FW	7	(Netherlands) Abdelhali Chaiat		(substituted in) 77'
FW	20	(Netherlands) Sandro Calabro		(substituted in) 83'
Manager:
(Netherlands) Foeke Booy
