= Piet van Overbeek =

Dutch footballer (1926–2004)

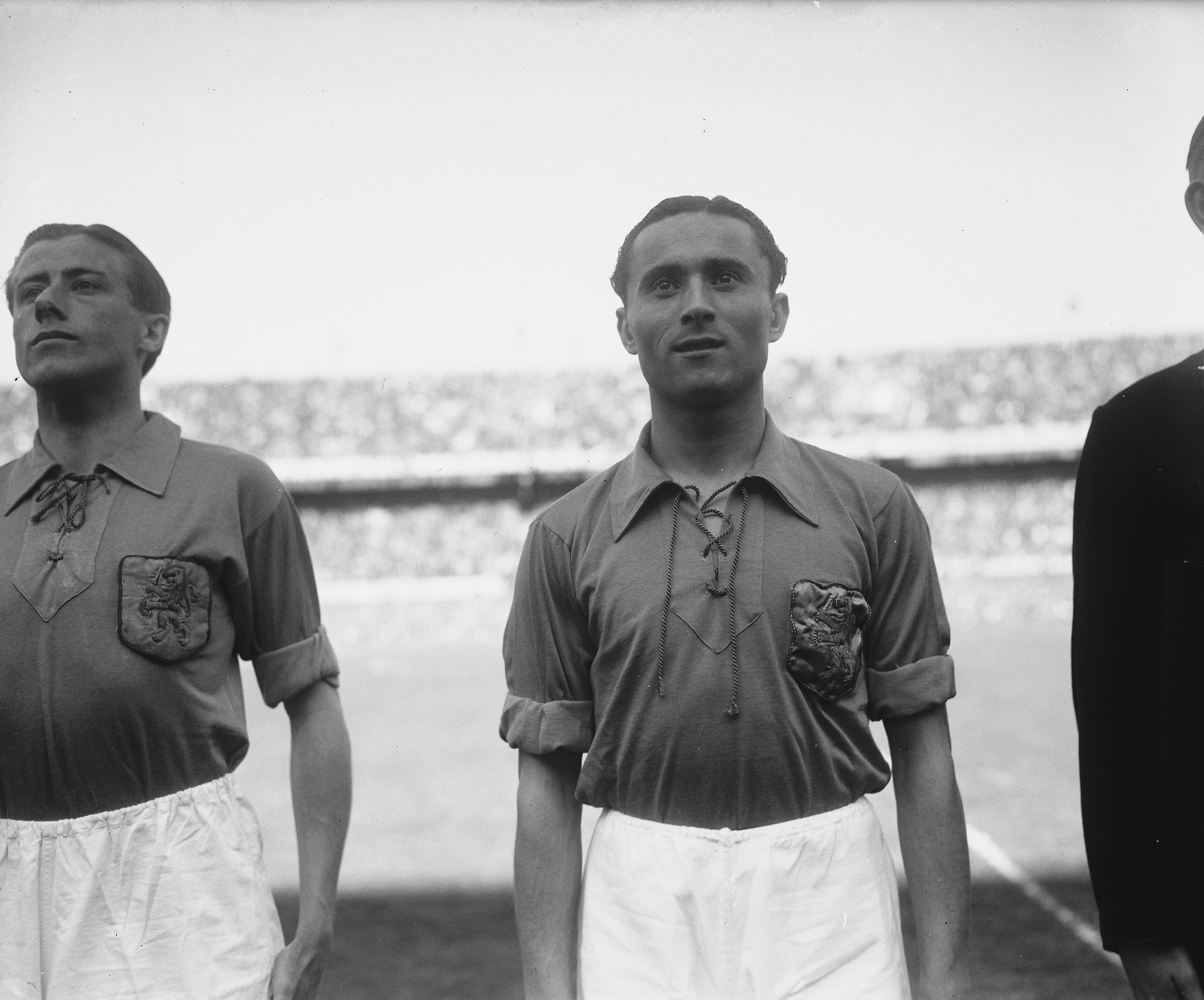
- Van Overbeek (1949)

Personal information
- Date of birth: 6 May 1926
- Place of birth: 's-Hertogenbosch, Netherlands
- Date of death: 8 January 2004 (aged 77)
- Position: Right winger

Senior career*
Years	Team	Apps	(Gls)
- BVV

International career
1949	Netherlands	1	(0)
- * Club domestic league appearances and goals

Piet van Overbeek (6 May 1926 – 8 January 2004) was a Dutch footballer who played as a right winger for BVV. With BVV, he won the 1047–48 Dutch national championship. He made one appearance for the Netherlands national team, starting in a 4–1 win against France on 23 April 1949. He was the grandfather of footballer Anthony Lurling. Van Overbeek died on 8 January 2004, at the age of 77.
