= Ebi Smolarek =

Polish footballer

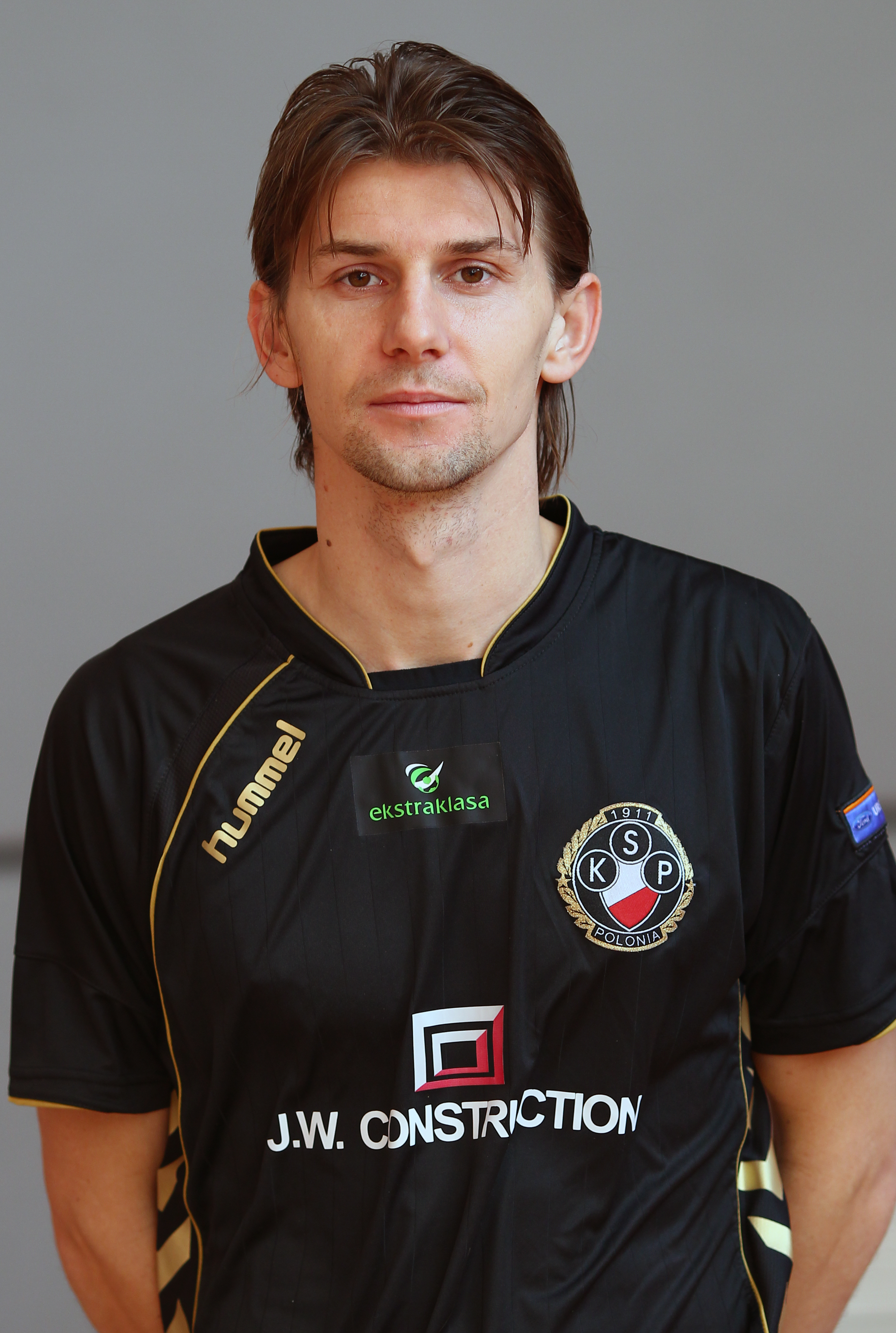
- Smolarek with Polonia Warsaw in 2011

Personal information
- Full name: Euzebiusz Smolarek
- Date of birth: 9 January 1981 (age 45)
- Place of birth: Łódź, Poland
- Height: 1.78 m (5 ft 10 in)
- Positions: Striker; winger

Youth career
- VV Spirit
- 1993–2000: Feyenoord

Senior career*
Years	Team	Apps	(Gls)
2000–2005	Feyenoord	68	(12)
2005–2007	Borussia Dortmund	81	(25)
2007–2009	Racing Santander	34	(4)
2008–2009	→ Bolton Wanderers (loan)	12	(0)
2009–2010	Kavala	15	(3)
2010–2011	Polonia Warsaw	23	(7)
2011–2012	Al-Khor	10	(3)
2012	ADO Den Haag	12	(2)
2012–2013	Jagiellonia Białystok	20	(4)
Total		275	(60)

International career
2002–2010	Poland	47	(19)

Managerial career
- 2014: Feyenoord (youth)
- * Club domestic league appearances and goals

Euzebiusz "Ebi" Smolarek (Polish pronunciation: [ɛu̯ˈzɛbjuʂ smɔˈlarɛk]; born 9 January 1981) is a Polish former professional footballer. He is currently the head of the Polish Union of Footballers.

He played primarily as a striker or winger, representing clubs in the Netherlands, Germany, Poland, Spain, England, Greece, and Qatar.

Smolarek played 47 times for the Poland national football team, scoring 19 goals, the joint-tenth most in the nation's history. He was part of the Polish squads at the 2006 FIFA World Cup and UEFA Euro 2008. He was voted the Polish Footballer of the Year in 2005, 2006 and 2007.

== Club career ==
Born in Łódź, Smolarek grew up in the Netherlands, where his father, Włodzimierz Smolarek, played in the Eredivisie and later worked as a coach. Smolarek went through the Feyenoord youth system and made it all the way to the first team.

On 24 August 2007, Smolarek signed with Racing de Santander for a reported €4.8 million.

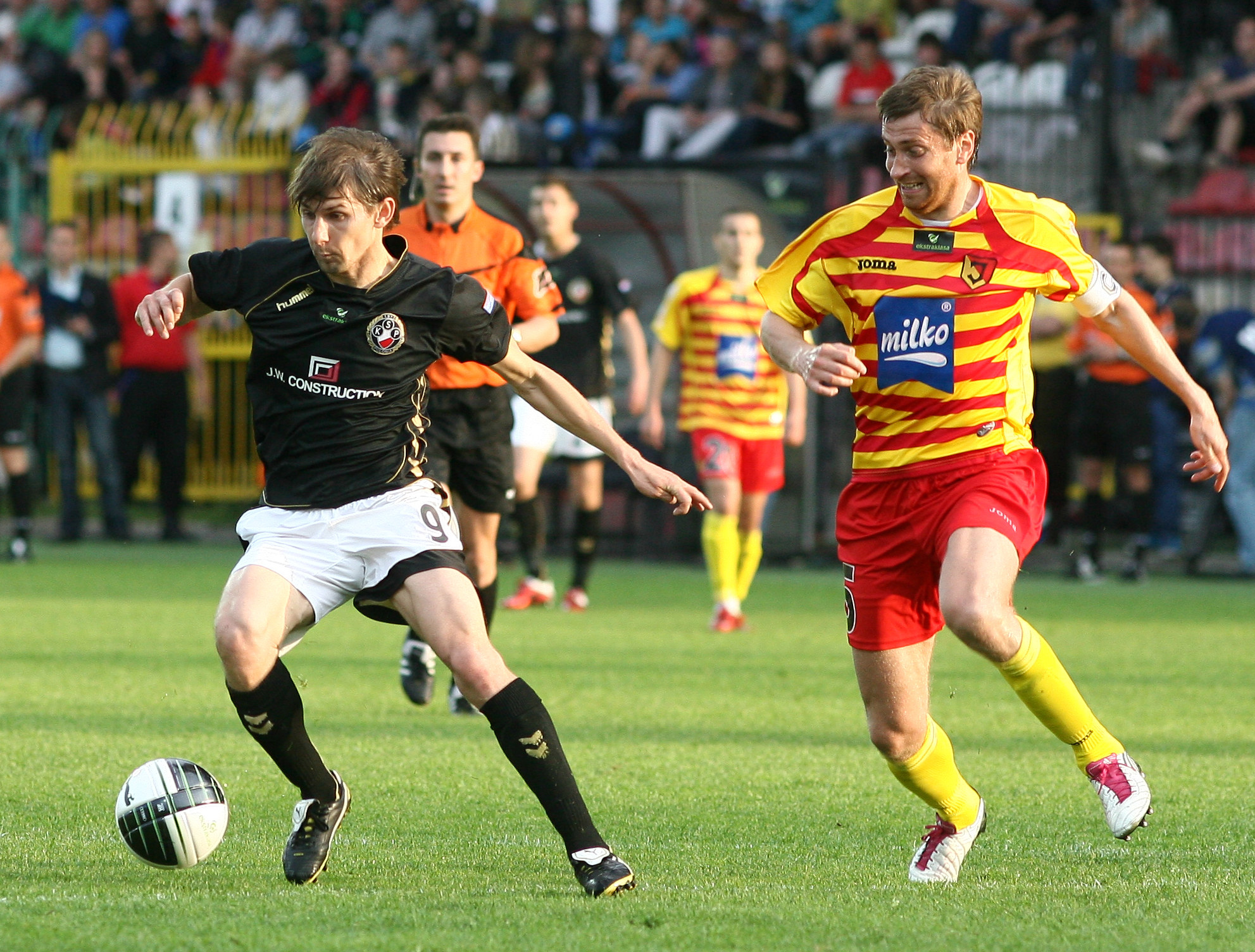
Smolarek (left) and Andrius Skerla

On 29 August 2008, Racing loaned Smolarek to Bolton Wanderers for the season, with a view to signing him permanently. Smolarek's debut for his new club came as the team lost 3–1 to Arsenal on 20 September 2008.

On 3 January 2009, Smolarek scored his first, and only, goal for Bolton in the FA Cup 3rd Round match away to Sunderland but at the end of the season the club decided not to make his loan permanent. On 10 August 2009 he was released by Racing.

Despite some interest from Bundesliga clubs at the start of the 2009–10 season, Smolarek signed on 14 December 2009 with Kavala until 30 June 2012. On 25 July 2010, he and the club agreed to cancel his contract by mutual consent. He signed a two-year contract with Polonia Warsaw on 27 July 2010. On 29 July 2011, Smolarek agreed to cancel his contract with Polonia due to his financial expectations.

Smolarek also played for Ekstraklasa side Jagiellonia Białystok.

== International career ==
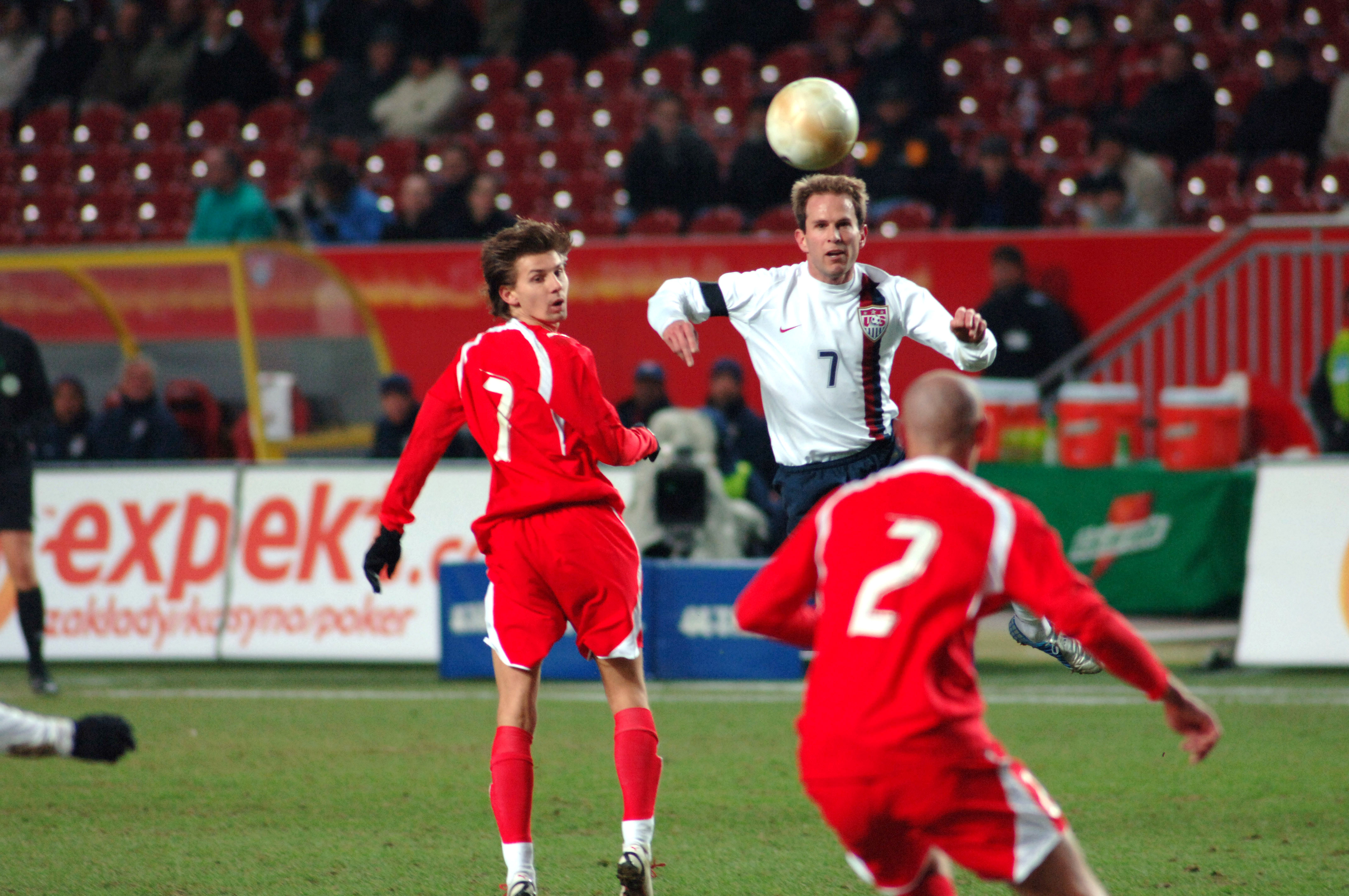
Smolarek challenging for the ball against Eddie Lewis of the United States in a March 2006 friendly

A Polish international since 2002, Smolarek was selected for the 2006 FIFA World Cup but failed to score any goals.

He was Poland's and Group A's top scorer in UEFA Euro 2008 qualifying scoring nine goals, beating Cristiano Ronaldo. Smolarek scored a hat-trick against Kazakhstan in Warsaw. He played all of the nation's matches in Switzerland and Austria, as Poland exited in the group stages.

Smolarek became the first Pole to score a goal against Portugal in 20 years, the previous one being his father. Smolarek scored both goals in a 2–1 win in a Euro 2008-qualifying match.

On 1 April 2009, Smolarek scored four goals against San Marino. This made him top goal scorer for group three and tied him with Belgium's Wesley Sonck for second highest goal scorer for the European Zone of the 2010 FIFA World Cup Qualification.

== Personal life ==
Smolarek is the son of another Polish international, Włodzimierz Smolarek. He was named after Portuguese footballer Eusébio. With his Dutch fiancée Thirza van Giessen he has a son (b. 27 April 2010), named Mees.

== Career statistics ==
=== Club ===
Appearances and goals by club, season and competition
Club	Season	League			National cup (Note: Includes KNVB Cup, DFB-Pokal, Copa del Rey, FA Cup, Greek Football Cup, Polish Cup)		Continental		Total	
Club	Season	Division	Apps	Goals	Apps	Goals	Apps	Goals	Apps	Goals
Feyenoord	2000–01	Eredivisie	25	3	0	0	2 (Note: Appearance(s) in UEFA Cup)	0	27	3
Feyenoord	2001–02	Eredivisie	19	2	1	0	7 (Note: Two appearances in UEFA Champions League, five appearances in UEFA Cup)	0	27	2
Feyenoord	2002–03	Eredivisie	0	0	0	0	0	0	0	0
Feyenoord	2003–04	Eredivisie	21	7	0	0	1	0	22	7
Feyenoord	2004–05	Eredivisie	3	0	0	0	4	0	7	0
Feyenoord	Total		68	12	1	0	14	0	83	12
Borussia Dortmund	2004–05	Bundesliga	15	3	0	0	0	0	15	3
Borussia Dortmund	2005–06	Bundesliga	34	13	1	0	2 (Note: Appearances in UEFA Intertoto Cup)	0	37	13
Borussia Dortmund	2006–07	Bundesliga	30	9	2	0	0	0	32	9
Borussia Dortmund	2007–08	Bundesliga	2	0	1	1	0	0	3	1
Borussia Dortmund	Total		81	25	4	1	2	0	87	26
Racing Santander	2007–08	La Liga	34	4	6	2	—		40	6
Bolton Wanderers (loan)	2008–09	Premier League	12	0	1	1	—		13	1
Kavala	2009–10	Super League Greece	15	3	3	0	—		18	3
Polonia Warsaw	2010–11	Ekstraklasa	23	7	3	0	—		26	7
Al-Khor	2011–12	Qatar Stars League	10	3	0	0	—		10	3
ADO Den Haag	2011–12	Eredivisie	12	2	0	0	—		12	2
Jagiellonia	2012–13	Ekstraklasa	20	4	3	1	—		23	5
Career total			275	60	21	5	16	0	312	65

=== International ===
Appearances and goals by national team and year
National team	Year	Apps	Goals
Poland	2002	1	0
Poland	2004	2	0
Poland	2005	7	3
Poland	2006	11	4
Poland	2007	6	6
Poland	2008	11	2
Poland	2009	5	4
Poland	2010	4	1
Total		47	20

Scores and results list Poland's goal tally first, score column indicates score after each Smolarek goal.

List of international goals scored by Ebi Smolarek
No.	Date	Venue	Opponent	Score	Result	Competition	Ref.
1	3 September 2005	Stadion Narodowy, Warsaw, Poland	Austria	1–0	3–2	2006 FIFA World Cup qualification	
2	17 October 2005	Polish Army Stadium, Warsaw, Poland	Iceland	3–2	3–2	Friendly	
3	13 November 2005	Mini Estadi, Barcelona, Spain	Ecuador	2–0	3–0	Friendly	
4	3 June 2006	Volkswagen Arena, Wolfsburg, Germany	Croatia	1–0	1–0	Friendly	
5	7 October 2006	Almaty Central Stadium, Almaty, Kazakhstan	Kazakhstan	1–0	1–0	UEFA Euro 2008 qualifying	
6	11 October 2006	Silesian Stadium, Chorzów, Poland	Portugal	1–0	2–1	UEFA Euro 2008 qualifying	
7	11 October 2006	Silesian Stadium, Chorzów, Poland	Portugal	2–0	2–1	UEFA Euro 2008 qualifying	
8	2 June 2007	Tofiq Bahramov Republican Stadium, Baku, Azerbaijan	Azerbaijan	1–1	3–1	UEFA Euro 2008 qualifying	
9	13 October 2007	Polish Army Stadium, Warsaw, Poland	Kazakhstan	1–1	3–1	UEFA Euro 2008 qualifying	
10	13 October 2007	Polish Army Stadium, Warsaw, Poland	Kazakhstan	2–1	3–1	UEFA Euro 2008 qualifying	
11	13 October 2007	Polish Army Stadium, Warsaw, Poland	Kazakhstan	3–1	3–1	UEFA Euro 2008 qualifying	
12	17 November 2007	Silesian Stadium, Chorzów, Poland	Belgium	1–0	2–0	UEFA Euro 2008 qualifying	
13	17 November 2007	Silesian Stadium, Chorzów, Poland	Belgium	2–0	2–0	UEFA Euro 2008 qualifying	
14	10 September 2008	San Marino Stadium, Serravalle, San Marino	San Marino	1–0	2–0	2010 FIFA World Cup qualification	
15	15 October 2008	Tehelné pole, Bratislava, Slovakia	Slovakia	1–0	1–2	2010 FIFA World Cup qualification	
16	1 April 2009	Stadion Miejski, Kielce, Poland	San Marino	2–0	10–0	2010 FIFA World Cup qualification	
17	1 April 2009	Stadion Miejski, Kielce, Poland	San Marino	6–0	10–0	2010 FIFA World Cup qualification	
18	1 April 2009	Stadion Miejski, Kielce, Poland	San Marino	8–0	10–0	2010 FIFA World Cup qualification	
19	1 April 2009	Stadion Miejski, Kielce, Poland	San Marino	9–0	10–0	2010 FIFA World Cup qualification	
20	12 October 2010	Saputo Stadium, Montreal, Canada	Ecuador	1–1	2–2	Friendly	

== Honours ==
Feyenoord

- UEFA Cup: 2001–02

Individual

- Polish Footballer of the Year: 2005, 2006, 2007
