= Hugo (footballer, born 1974) =

Brazilian football manager

Personal information
- Full name: Hugo Alves Velame
- Date of birth: 23 July 1974 (age 52)
- Place of birth: Duque de Caxias, Brazil
- Height: 1.70 m (5 ft 7 in)
- Position: Attacking midfielder

Youth career
- 1988–1993: Flamengo

Senior career*
Years	Team	Apps	(Gls)
1993–1995	Flamengo	39	(0)
1996	→ Bahia (loan)	?	(?)
1996	→ Fluminense (loan)	18	(1)
1997	→ América de Rio Preto (loan)	0	(0)
1997–2005	Groningen	206	(29)
2005–2006	AEP Paphos	1	(0)
2006	Veendam	5	(0)
2008–2009	Almirante Brown	3	(3)
Total		272	(33)

Managerial career
- 2006–2015: Groningen (youth)
- 2013–2016: VV Pelikaan-S
- 2016–2017: Cambuur (youth)
- 2019: HFC '15
- 2020–2022: Al-Ittihad (youth)
- 2023: Jordan women (assistant)
- * Club domestic league appearances and goals

Hugo Alves Velame (born 23 July 1974), simply known as Hugo, is a Brazilian professional football manager and former player who is the assistant manager of the Jordan women's national team.

== Playing career ==
Hugo began his career in the youth system of Flamengo and played for their first team from 1993 to 1995. Afterward, he was loaned to Bahia, Fluminense, and América de Rio Preto. He then moved to Dutch Eredivisie club Groningen, where he became a club icon as their attacking midfielder, making more than 200 appearance for the club in nine years. He later played in Cyprus and had a brief stint with Veendam. In the 2007–08 season, Hugo served as a youth coach at Groningen. After spending a year playing for Almirante Brown in Argentina, he returned to Groningen.

== Coaching career ==
Hugo, who also acquired Dutch nationality, began his coaching career as a youth coach at Groningen. From the 2016–17 season, he managed the under-19 team at Cambuur and later briefly served as head coach of VV Pelikaan-S. In December 2018, Hugo was appointed the coach of the Saturday Tweede Klasse team of HFC '15 starting January 2019, while also coaching youth teams at various regional amateur clubs.

Between 2020 and 2022, he coached the under-13 and under-15 teams of Saudi Pro League club Al-Ittihad. In 2023, he was the assistant coach of the Jordan women's national team.
