= Jens Larsen =

Danish beach volleyball player (born 1969)

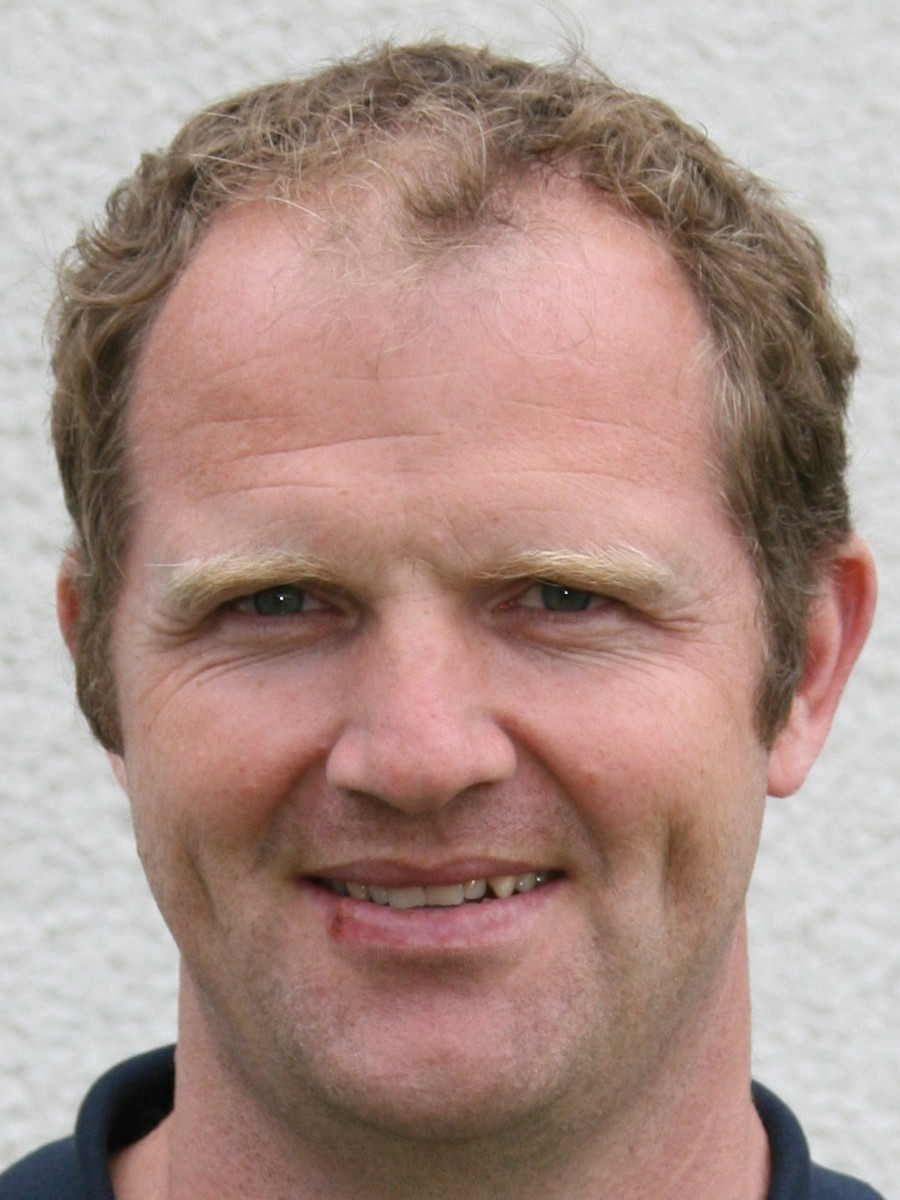
Jens Larsen

Jens Larsen (born August 22, 1969, in Aalborg) is a Danish former professional volleyball and beach volleyball player, and now the coach of the German club Wuppertal.

He has played for VHG (Vester Hassing Gymnastikforening), SV Bayer Wuppertal and HIK (Aalborg). He has coached Marienlyst (Denmark) and SV Bayer Wuppertal 1 (Germany)

== Playing partners ==
- Jesper Hansen
- Thomas Lyø
- Peter Lyø
