= Levi Risamasu =

Dutch footballer

Personal information
- Full name: Levi Risamasu
- Date of birth: 23 November 1982 (age 43)
- Place of birth: Nieuwerkerk aan den IJssel, Netherlands
- Height: 1.77 m (5 ft 10 in)
- Position: Midfielder

Senior career*
Years	Team	Apps	(Gls)
2001–2005	NAC Breda	19	(0)
2005–2008	AGOVV Apeldoorn	91	(3)
2008–2010	Excelsior	10	(0)
Total		120	(3)
- * Club domestic league appearances and goals

Levi Risamasu (born 23 November 1982) is a Dutch former footballer who played as a midfielder.

== Career statistics ==
Appearances and goals by club, season and competition
Club	Season	League		
Club	Season	Division	Apps	Goals
NAC Breda	2001–02	Eredivisie	9	0
NAC Breda	2002–03	Eredivisie	2	0
NAC Breda	2003–04	Eredivisie	1	0
NAC Breda	2004–05	Eredivisie	7	0
NAC Breda	Total		19	0
AGOVV Apeldoorn	2005–06	Eerste Divisie	36	3
AGOVV Apeldoorn	2006–07	Eerste Divisie	26	0
AGOVV Apeldoorn	2007–08	Eerste Divisie	30	0
AGOVV Apeldoorn	Total		91	3
SBV Excelsior	2008–09	Eerste Divisie	6	0
SBV Excelsior	2009–10	Eerste Divisie	4	0
SBV Excelsior	Total		10	0
Career total			120	3
