= Jürgen Colin =

Dutch footballer (born 1981)

Personal information
- Full name: Jürgen Romano Colin
- Date of birth: 20 January 1981 (age 45)
- Place of birth: Utrecht, Netherlands
- Height: 1.83 m (6 ft 0 in)
- Position: Centre back

Youth career
- 1987–1988: HMS
- 1988–2000: PSV

Senior career*
Years	Team	Apps	(Gls)
2000–2004	PSV	24	(1)
2002	→ Genk (loan)	7	(0)
2002–2003	→ NAC (loan)	34	(0)
2004–2005	NAC	28	(1)
2005–2007	Norwich City	58	(0)
2007–2008	Ajax	12	(0)
2008–2009	Sporting Gijón	2	(0)
2009–2010	RKC	21	(0)
2010–2013	Anorthosis	66	(0)
2013–2015	Hapoel Tel Aviv	39	(0)
2015–2016	Hapoel Ashkelon	21	(0)
2016	Torpedo Kutaisi	4	(0)
Total		316	(2)

International career
2002-2003	Netherlands U21	5	(0)
- * Club domestic league appearances and goals as of 2 October 2016

Jürgen Romano Colin (born 20 January 1981) is a Dutch former professional footballer who played as a central defender.

== Club career ==
Born in Utrecht of Surinamese descent, Colin started his professional career at PSV Eindhoven – after arriving in the club's youth system at the age of seven – having signed from amateurs HMS. His debut came on 22 August 2001 in a 3–2 home win against FC Den Bosch, and he went on to play three more matches before he was sent on loan to K.R.C. Genk, with whom he won the 2001–02 edition of the Belgian Pro League.

The following season Colin was sent on loan again, to NAC Breda, for which he played every game during the campaign. He returned to PSV for 2003–04 and became a full squad member, making 20 league appearances. The following season he was loaned once again to NAC. His solid performances in 2004–05 earned him a transfer to Football League Championship's Norwich City. Believed to be worth £263,000 or 300,000 euro from PSV.

Colin had a difficult first year at Norwich and struggled for form, eventually losing his place at right back to Craig Fleming. He was re-instated to the team at the start of the 2006–07 season and ultimately retained his status; however, when new club manager Peter Grant took over, he lost his place to versatile midfielder Andy Hughes.

In early July 2007, Colin was invited to a three-week trial with Eredivisie giants AFC Ajax. On the 30th the move was finalised for a fee of €100,000, and made his official debut for the Amsterdam team in the Supercup 1–0 defeat of former club PSV, winning his second career trophy.

However, after having appeared sparingly during the campaign, Colin moved to La Liga team Sporting de Gijón in August 2008, signing a one-year link. Beginning the season in the starting XI, he was dropped after a 1–7 thrashing at Real Madrid and never appeared officially again.

On 25 August 2009, Colin moved for free to RKC Waalwijk also in the Netherlands' top level. After only one full season, which ended in relegation, he moved abroad again, signing for Cypriot First Division side Anorthosis Famagusta F.C.; on 9 February 2012, he extended his contract at the latter until 2015.

32-year-old Colin moved to Hapoel Tel Aviv F.C. on a two-year deal on 2 June 2013, joining the Israelis with teammate Branko Ilič.

== International career ==
Colin represented the Netherlands the 2001 FIFA World Youth Championship, scoring one goal in an eventual group stage exit in Argentina.

== Club statistics ==
As of 26 January 2014

Season	Club	Competition	Apps	Goals
2001/02	PSV	Eredivisie	4	0
2001/02	Genk	Belgian Pro League	7	0
2002/03	NAC	Eredivisie	34	0
2003/04	PSV	Eredivisie	20	1
2004/05	NAC	Eredivisie	28	1
2005/06	Norwich City	Championship	25	0
2006/07	Norwich City	Championship	33	0
2007/08	Ajax	Eredivisie	12	0
2008/09	Sporting Gijón	La Liga	2	0
2009/10	RKC	Eredivisie	7	0
2010/11	RKC	Eerste Divisie	14	0
2010/11	Anorthosis	Cypriot First Division	12	0
2011/12	Anorthosis	Cypriot First Division	31	0
2012/13	Anorthosis	Cypriot First Division	23	0
2013/14	Hapoel Tel Aviv	Israeli Premier League	17	0

== Honours ==
Genk

- Belgian Pro League: 2001–02

PSV

- Johan Cruijff Shield: 2003

Ajax

- Johan Cruijff Shield: 2007

RKC Waalwijk:

- Eerste Divisie: 2010–11

Hapoel Ashkelon

- Toto Cup: 2015–16
