= Brayton Biekman =

Dutch footballer (born 1978)

Personal information
- Date of birth: 16 December 1978 (age 47)
- Place of birth: The Hague, Netherlands
- Height: 1.90 m (6 ft 3 in)
- Position: Forward

Team information
- Current team: Elinkwijk

Youth career
- LMO
- SHO
- SC Feyenoord
- Utrecht

Senior career*
| Years | Team | Apps | (Gls) |
| 2003–2006 | Den Bosch | 50 | (5) |
| 2005 | → Excelsior (loan) | 16 | (3) |
| 2006 | Excelsior | 15 | (0) |
| 2007–2008 | Rijnsburgse Boys | | |
| 2008–2009 | DOVO | | |
| 2009–2010 | Elinkwijk | | |
| 2010–2013 | Argon | 52 | (6) |
| 2013–2015 | Bennekom | | |
| 2015–2016 | DFS | | |
| 2016–2017 | Lienden | 9 | (0) |
| 2019–2020 | Smitshoek | | |
| 2021–2022 | HVC | | |
| 2022–2024 | SV Houten | | |
| 2024– | Elinkwijk | | |
- * Club domestic league appearances and goals as of 4 February 2026

Brayton Biekman (born 16 December 1978) is a Dutch professional footballer who plays as a forward for Elinkwijk.

== Club career ==
Biekman began playing amateur football with LMO, SHO, SC Feyenoord and the FC Utrecht youth. He made his professional debut for FC Den Bosch on 17 August 2003 with a 1–3 away win at HFC Haarlem. In 2004, FC Den Bosch was promoted to the Eredivisie, where he would appear in 14 matches. Halfway during the 2004–05 season, Biekman was loaned out to Excelsior Rotterdam. After 16 matches and 3 goals he returned to FC Den Bosch, who were relegated and began the 2005–06 season in the Eerste Divisie. Halfway during the 2005–06 season he was sold to Excelsior, who became Eerste Divisie champions that season. After 15 matches without a goal he went to Rijnsburgse Boys in the Zaterdag Hoofdklasse A.

=== Amateur football ===
After leaving Rijnsburgse Boys, he had spells at DOVO, Elinkwijk and Argon. He spent several seasons playing in the Hoofdklasse, with him moving to DFS from fellow Hoofdklasse side Bennekom in summer 2015. In January 2016, Biekman was announced as a new signing by Tweede Divisie outfit FC Lienden for the 2016/17 season. He began playing for Vierde Klasse club HVC in 2021. After one season, he moved to SV Houten, where he contributed to the team's promotion to the Tweede Klasse.

== Honours ==
Den Bosch

- Eerste Divisie: 2003–04
