= Robert Schellander =

Austrian footballer

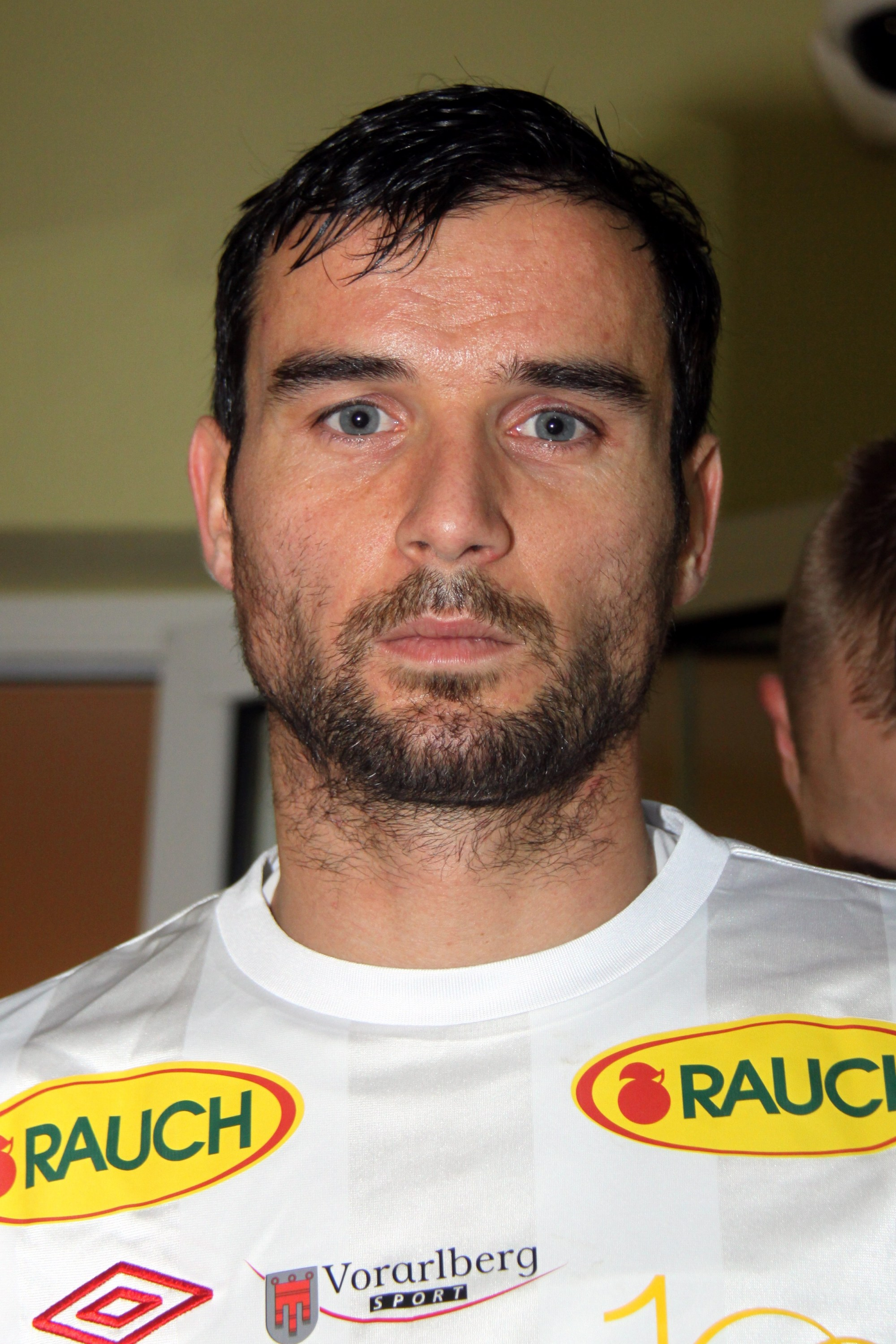

Personal information
- Full name: Robert Schellander
- Date of birth: 31 January 1983 (age 43)
- Place of birth: Klagenfurt, Austria
- Height: 1.78 m (5 ft 10 in)
- Positions: Left back; left midfielder

Team information
- Current team: SC Austria Lustenau
- Number: 16

Senior career*
Years	Team	Apps	(Gls)
2002–2008	Kärnten	100	(7)
2007–2008	→ Greuther Furth (loan)	3	(1)
2008–2010	Kapfenberg	49	(2)
2010–2012	LASK Linz	43	(0)
2012–2014	SC Austria Lustenau	14	(0)
2014–	SC Bregenz	0	(0)

International career
2003–05	Austria U-21	5	(0)
- * Club domestic league appearances and goals as of 8 February 2014

Robert Schellander (born 31 January 1983) is an Austrian professional association football player who currently plays for Austrian Regional League side SC Bregenz. He plays as a midfielder.
