= Jean Carlos (footballer, born 1983) =

Brazilian footballer

Personal information
- Full name: Jean Carlos Dondé
- Date of birth: 12 August 1983 (age 43)
- Place of birth: Canoinhas, Brazil
- Height: 1.80 m (5 ft 11 in)
- Position: Defender

Youth career
- 2001–2003: Atlético Paranaense

Senior career*
Years	Team	Apps	(Gls)
2003	Atlético Paranaense	16	(2)
2003–2006	Feyenoord	9	(0)
2004–2005	→ Hamburger SV (loan)	1	(0)
2006	→ Fluminense (loan)	34	(3)
2007–2010	Asteras Tripolis	31	(2)
2010–2011	Atlético Paranaense	1	(0)
2010	→ Paraná (loan)	2	(0)
2011	Seongnam Ilhwa Chunma	3	(0)
Total		97	(7)
- * Club domestic league appearances and goals

Jean Carlos Dondé, or simply Jean Carlos (born 12 August 1983), is a Brazilian former professional footballer who played as a defender.

== Career ==
Dondé was born in Canoinhas. He played for Fluminense on loan from Feyenoord until 2007 when he got a transfer to Asteras Tripolis. On 23 February 2010, Atlético Paranaense signed the Brazilian defender from Greek side Asteras Tripolis. On 16 March 2011, he joined South Korean club Seongnam Ilhwa Chunma.
