= Kurt Elshot =

Dutch footballer (born 1977)

Personal information
- Full name: Kurt Elshot
- Date of birth: 3 July 1977 (age 49)
- Place of birth: Paramaribo, Suriname
- Height: 1.81 m (5 ft 11 in)
- Position: Right back

Youth career
- SC Gronitas
- GVAV-Rapiditas

Senior career*
Years	Team	Apps	(Gls)
1995–2005	Groningen	243	(4)
2005–2010	NAC	106	(3)
- * Club domestic league appearances and goals as of 14:09, 4 September 2010 (UTC)

Kurt Elshot (born 3 July 1977) is a Dutch former professional footballer. He usually played as a defender in a right-back position. He has formerly played for FC Groningen and NAC Breda.

== Club career ==
=== Youth ===
Elshot was born in Paramaribo, Suriname. As a youth, he moved to Geleen, a town in Limburg, the Netherlands. At age six, he moved to Groningen in the northern part of the country, and this was also where he started his footballing career, at local amateur side SC Gronitas. Some years later, he moved to GVAV-Rapiditas, an amateur club known as one of FC Groningen's feeder clubs. He was therefore brought to FC Groningen in 1995 and was introduced to the first team a year later.

=== Professional ===
On 31 March 1996, Elshot made his Eredivisie debut in an away match against FC Utrecht where he replaced Mathias Florén as a substitute in the 70th minute. Elshot would go on to appear in 243 league matches for Groningen, in which he scored 4 goals. On 22 March 2005, Elshot signed a five-year contract with NAC Breda, which would keep him at the club until 2010. He was released from the club in 2010, following financial troubles at the club.

On 2 August 2010, Elshot won the prize for "Most Fashionable Footballer 2010", hosted by Esquire, for the footballer in the Dutch Eredivisie with the best fashion style.

== Fashion career ==
After retiring as a player, Elshot became a fashion designer.

== Statistics ==
Season	Club	Apps	Goals	League
1995/96	FC Groningen	2	0	Eredivisie
1996/97	FC Groningen	16	0	Eredivisie
1997/98	FC Groningen	27	0	Eredivisie
1998/99	FC Groningen	26	0	Eerste divisie
1999/00	FC Groningen	32	0	Eerste divisie
2000/01	FC Groningen	33	1	Eredivisie
2001/02	FC Groningen	19	1	Eredivisie
2002/03	FC Groningen	27	0	Eredivisie
2003/04	FC Groningen	31	0	Eredivisie
2004/05	FC Groningen	30	2	Eredivisie
2005/06	NAC Breda	33	0	Eredivisie
2006/07	NAC Breda	14	0	Eredivisie
2007/08	NAC Breda	31	2	Eredivisie
2008/09	NAC Breda	10	0	Eredivisie
2009/10	NAC Breda	1	1	Eredivisie
Total		332	7	
