= Canoinhas =

Municipality of Santa Catarina, Brazil

- Municipality of Santa Catarina, Brazil
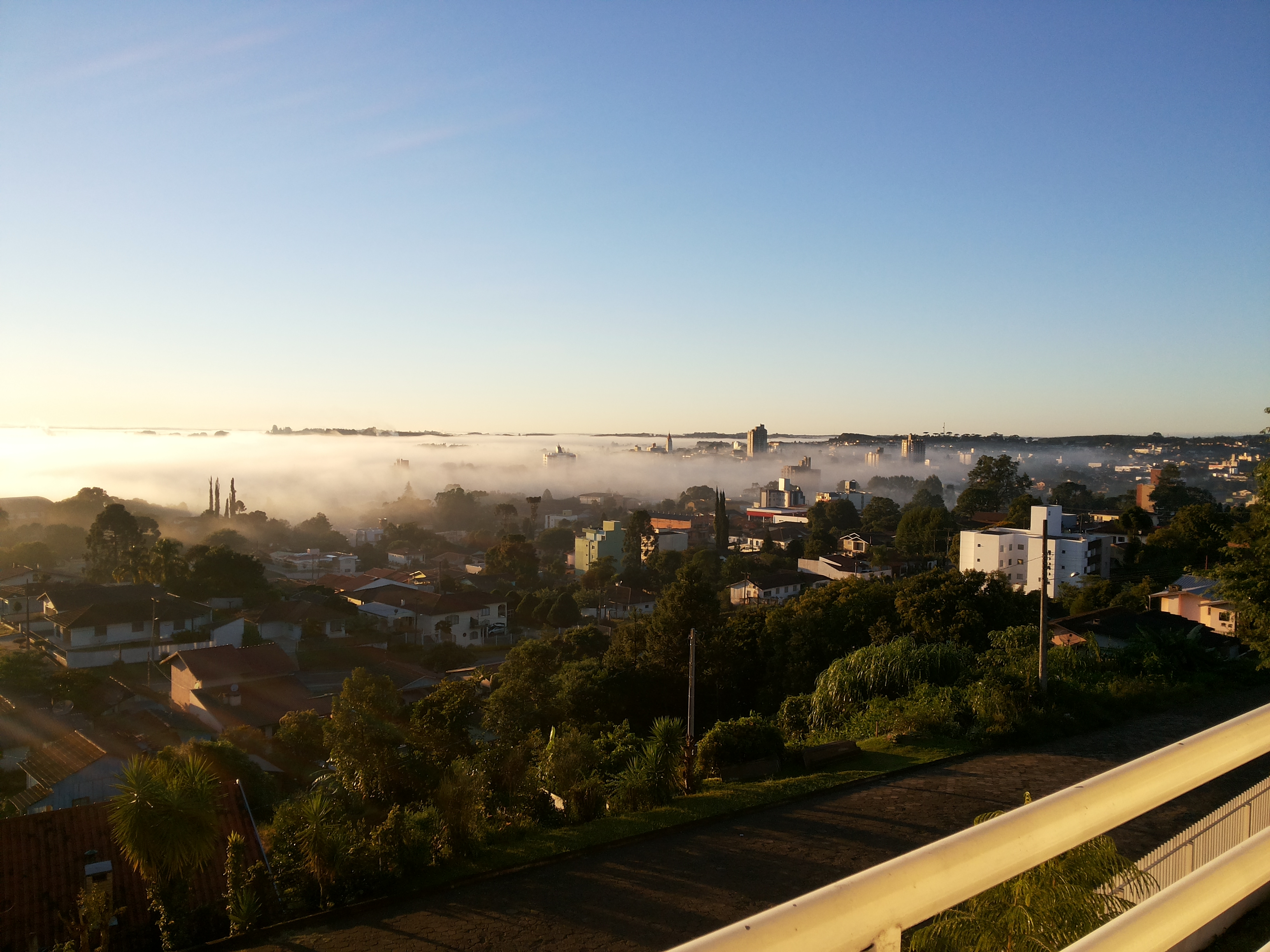
- View of Canoinhas

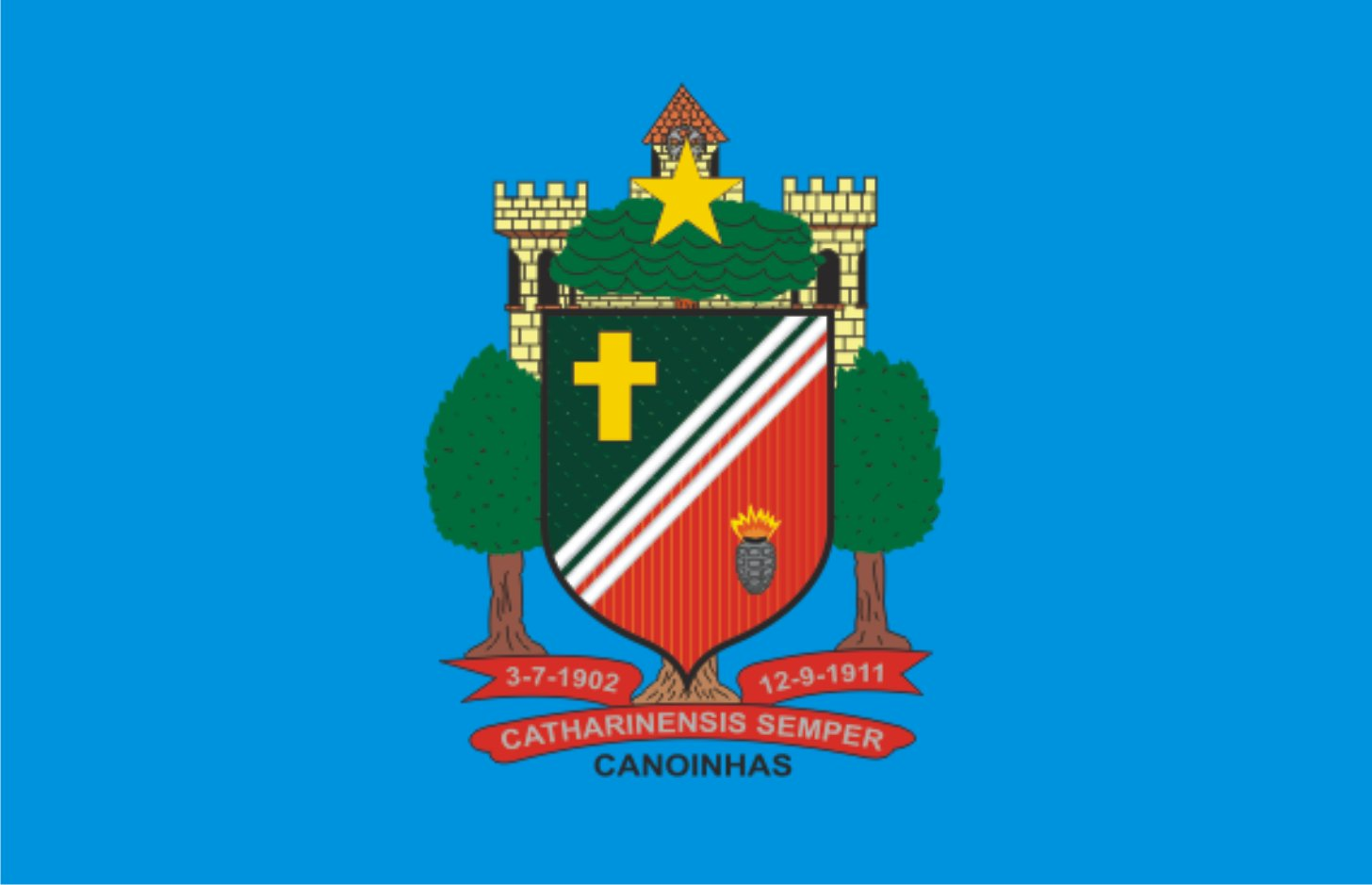
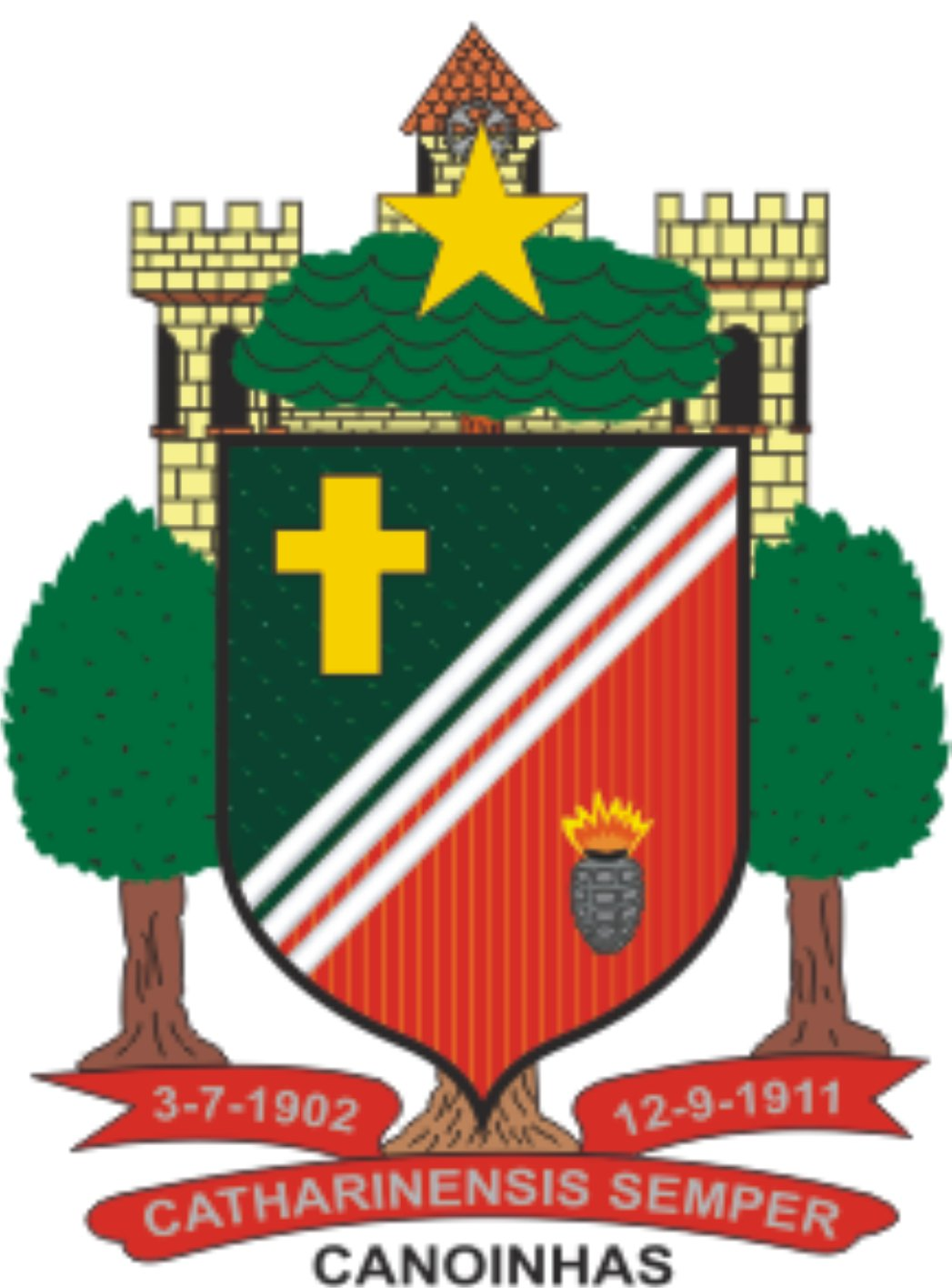
- Flag Coat of arms
- Motto: Latin: Catharinensis Semper; English: Always Catarinense
- Location of Canoinhas in Santa Catarina

- Location within Brazil Location within South America
- Coordinates: 26°10′37″S 50°23′24″W
- Country: Brazil
- Region: South
- State: Santa Catarina
- Founded: 12 November 1911

Government
  - Mayor: Juliana Maciel Hoppe (PL) (2025-2028)
  - Vice Mayor: Zenilda Lemos de Souza (UNIÃO) (2025-2028)

Area
  - Total: 1,148.036 km^{2} (443.259 sq mi)
- Elevation: 839 m (2,753 ft)

Population (2022)
  - Total: 55,016
  - Density: 47.92/km^{2} (124.1/sq mi)
- Demonym: Canoinhense (Brazilian Portuguese)
- Time zone: UTC-03:00 (Brasília Time)
- Postal code: 89460-000, 89470-000, 89473-000, 89476-000
- HDI (2010): 0.757 – high
- Website: canoinhas.atende.net

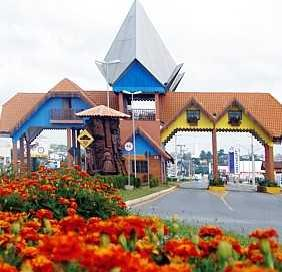

Canoinhas is a Brazilian municipality, in the north plateau of the State of Santa Catarina. Its latitude is 26°10'38" South, its longitude is 50°23'24" West, and its altitude is 839 meters. The population was estimated in 2020 at 54,480 inhabitants.

The area of the city is 1143.6 square kilometers.

The city's economy primarily depends on agriculture and logging.

The city is also known worldwide as the world capital of Erva Mate, a herb used in a traditional drink called chimarrao, the herb Ilex Paraguariensis has been a main export of the region for quite some time.

== History ==
Francisco de Paula Pereira is known to be the founder of the town, it was a popular stop for immigrants from Parana looking for the famous Erva Mate

== Twin towns – sister cities ==
Canoinhas is twinned with:

- Sterling, United States
