= GVAV-Rapiditas =

Association football club in the Netherlands

- Full name: Groninger Voetbal en Atletiek Vereniging Rapiditas
- Founded: 26 January 1921; 104 years ago
- Ground: Sportpark Kardinge, Groningen
- Capacity: 1,500
- Website: www.gvav.nl
Home colours

GVAV-Rapiditas is a Dutch multi-sport club based in Groningen, Netherlands. From 1954 to 1971, the club played professional football, and was a founder member of the Eredivisie in 1956. GVAV returned to amateur football in 1971, with the newly-founded FC Groningen taking their place in professional football.

== History ==
GVAV (Groninger Voetbal en Atletiek Vereniging; Groninger Football and Athletics Association in English) was founded in 1915. The athletics club Rapiditas was established two years later. Both clubs merged on 26 January 1921, and was named "Groningse sportvereniging GVAV-Rapiditas", whose membership was only open to men. It was not until the 1970s that the club was also opened to female athletes.

The new association consisted of a number of sections, including athletics, boxing, gymnastics, football and swimming. Rugby was also played for some time. Many sporting successes were achieved in these branches of sport, making GVAV-Rapiditas a well-known name in the Netherlands.

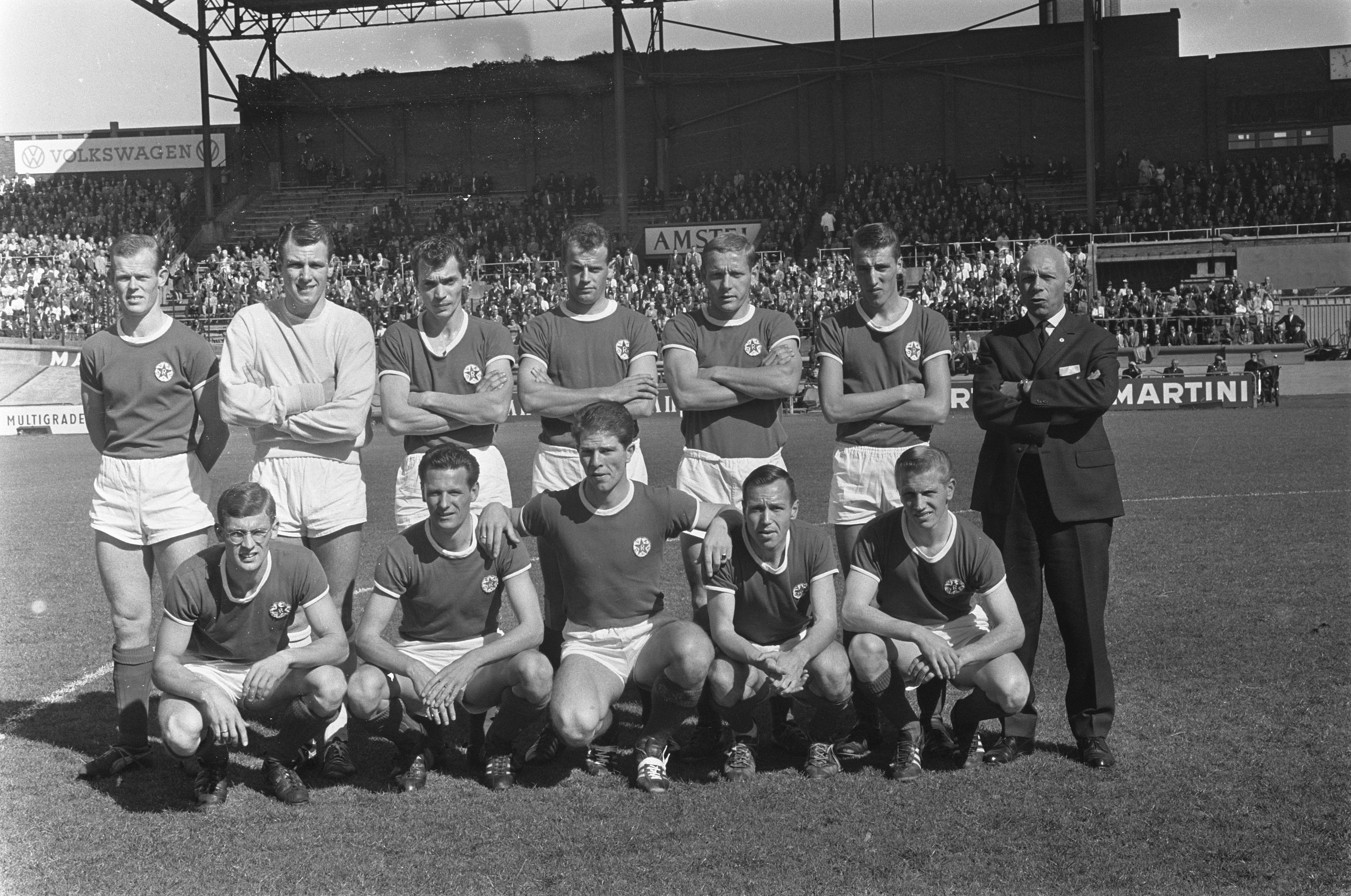
GVAV in 1964

In football, the club reached the first tier. In 1940, GVAV won the Northern Football Championship. In 1956, after the introduction of professional football, the club was a founder member of the first-tier Eredivisie. GVAV returned to amateur football in 1971, with the newly-founded FC Groningen taking their place in professional football.

In 1997, the organisation of GVAV-Rapiditas was changed. GVAV-Rapiditas became the Sports Federation GVAV-Rapiditas with a number of sections that became more or less independent clubs: gymnastics, triathlon and football. The athletics department merged in 2003 with ARGO '77 to become Groningen Atletiek. In September 2004, it was decided to dissolve the federation. Fellow consultation continued to exist at chairman level.

On 22 May 2022, GVAV-Rapiditas' first men's team won promotion to the Eerste Klasse, the sixth tier of the Dutch football league system, after winning the Tweede Klasse Sunday L group.
