= Martin Drent =

Dutch footballer

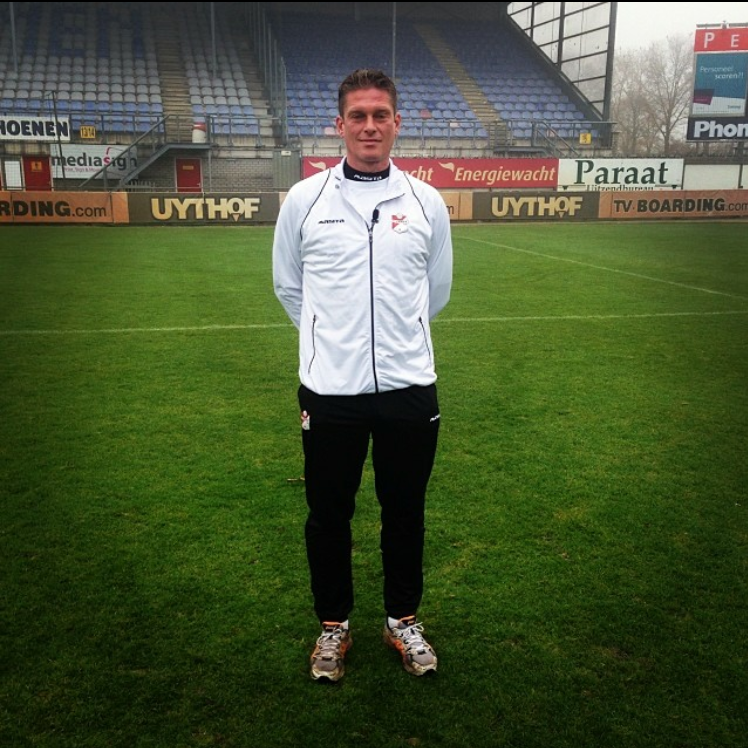
- Martin Drent

Personal information
- Full name: Martin Drent
- Date of birth: 31 March 1970 (age 56)
- Place of birth: Groningen, Netherlands
- Height: 1.93 m (6 ft 4 in)
- Position: Forward

Youth career
- Hellas VC

Senior career*
Years	Team	Apps	(Gls)
1991	GVAV-Rapiditas		
1991–1992	Groningen	10	(2)
1992–1993	Veendam	23	(6)
1993–1999	Emmen	166	(45)
1999–2005	Groningen	164	(48)
2005–2007	Veendam	45	(9)
Total		408	(110)
- * Club domestic league appearances and goals

Martin Drent (born 31 March 1970) is a Dutch former professional footballer who played as a forward for SC Veendam, FC Emmen and FC Groningen.

== Playing career ==
A big target man, Martin Drent started his career at amateur club GVAV-Rapiditas in 1991. His career in amateur football was short lived, however, as he proved his quality, signing for Eredivisie side FC Groningen in 1992. He played very few games at Groningen and left after just one season to join SC Veendam where he was a relative success. In 1993, he signed for FC Emmen where he played for six years. He returned to Groningen in 1999 where he scored 22 goals in his first season back at the club, helping them achieve promotion from the Eerste Divisie. In January 2005 he returned to another former club BV Veendam where he retired at the end of the season.

== Managerial career ==
After retiring as a player, Drent worked as commercial director at Veendam and became assistant to manager Joop Gall at Emmen in 2013 next to his job as coach at amateurs Rolder Boys. He was released by Emmen in 2014.

Drent was appointed head coach of amateur side DZOH in December 2015, only two weeks after being dismissed by Rohda Raalte.
