= Ramon Zomer =

Dutch former professional footballer (born 1983)

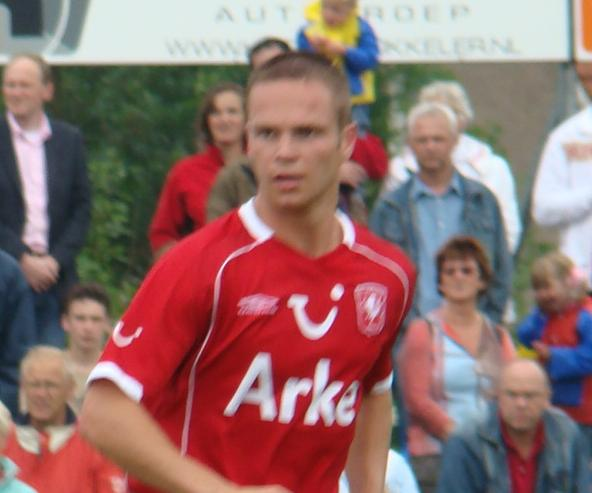

Personal information
- Full name: Ramon Zomer
- Date of birth: 13 April 1983 (age 43)
- Place of birth: Almelo, Netherlands
- Height: 1.84 m (6 ft 0 in)
- Position: Centre back

Youth career
- Daarlerveen
- Twente

Senior career*
Years	Team	Apps	(Gls)
2002–2008	Twente	122	(9)
2008–2011	NEC	92	(9)
2011–2014	SC Heerenveen	63	(2)
2014–2016	Heracles Almelo	50	(4)

International career
2005–2007	Netherlands U21	14	(0)
Medal record
Men's football
Representing Netherlands
UEFA European Under-21 Championship
Winner	2006 Portugal
- * Club domestic league appearances and goals

Ramon Zomer (Dutch pronunciation: [ˈraːmɔn ˈzoːmər], born 13 April 1983) is a Dutch former professional footballer who played as a centre back. Zomer played for Twente, NEC, SC Heerenveen, Heracles Almelo and the Netherlands national under-21 football team.

== Career ==
Zomer is a product of Twente's youth system, making his league debut during the 2002–03 season. He was a member of the Dutch squad that won the UEFA U-21 Championship in 2006. He joined NEC on loan in the 2008–09 season, and permanently in the summer of 2009. He served as a captain of the club during the 2010–11 season.

On 19 August 2011, Zomer signed a three-year contract with SC Heerenveen. After he lost his place in the first eleven, he left the club on a free transfer. He signed a one-year deal with Heracles Almelo on 27 June 2014.

Zomer retired on 1 November 2016.
