= Sjaak Polak =

Dutch footballer and manager (born 1976)

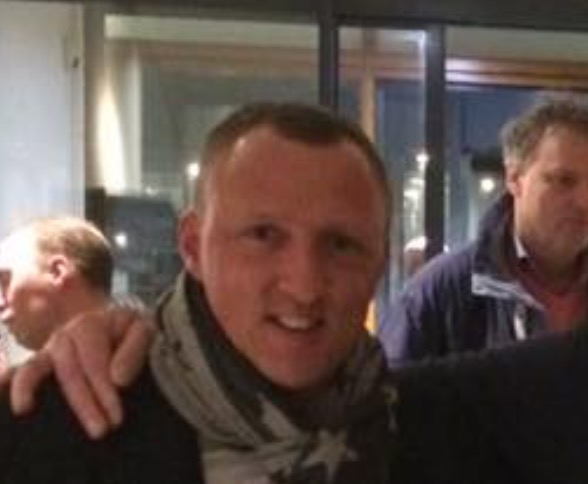
- Polak in 2017

Personal information
- Date of birth: 18 February 1976 (age 50)
- Place of birth: The Hague, Netherlands
- Height: 1.70 m (5 ft 7 in)
- Position: Left-back

Team information
- Current team: Lisse (head coach)

Youth career
- ADO Den Haag

Senior career*
Years	Team	Apps	(Gls)
1995–1996	Scheveningen		
1996–2001	Excelsior	132	(17)
2001–2004	Twente	92	(12)
2004–2005	ADO Den Haag	34	(5)
2005–2008	Sparta Rotterdam	80	(14)
2008–2010	Veendam	33	(6)
2009–2010	→ RBC Roosendaal (loan)	21	(5)
2010–2012	SVV Scheveningen		
2012–2013	Texas Dutch Lions	13	(2)

Managerial career
- 2012–2014: RSV Hoekpolder
- 2014–2016: Quick Boys II
- 2016–2017: RKSV GDA
- 2017–2019: SJC
- 2023–: Lisse
- * Club domestic league appearances and goals

Sjaak Polak (born 18 February 1976) is a Dutch professional football manager and former player who is the head coach of Derde Divisie club Lisse.

== Club career ==
An outspoken wingback and freekick specialist, Polak previously played for Excelsior, Twente, and ADO Den Haag. In May 2008, Sparta announced that they would not extend his contract. He joined Twente in January 2001 and went on to pick up a winner's medal when Twente won the 2001 KNVB Cup after a penalty shoot-out (in which he scored).

After that, Sjaak had several trials, in Austria for example with Austria Vienna and with Swiss club St. Gallen, but without success. He ended up in Israel on trial with Maccabi Tel Aviv. Maccabi was interested in Polak's services because of Jewish descent), and would not count as a foreigner for the club, thanks to the Israeli Law of Return. Polak had trouble getting the necessary documentation proving his family's Jewish origins and when he was told that he would be asked to give up his Dutch citizenship, he decided to sign for BV Veendam back in his native the Netherlands.

== Coaching career ==
After ending his career in 2012, Polak started his coaching career and was appointed as manager for four-division team RSV Hoekpolder.

In April 2014, Polak was appointed as manager for the reserve team of Quick Boys for the upcoming season. He stayed at the club for two seasons, before he was appointed at RKSV GDA. In November 2016, he was appointed manager of VV SJC for the 2017/18 season which meant, that he would continue at RKSV GDA until the end of the season. Due to disappointing results, Polak was fired on 23 April 2019.

In October 2023, Polak was appointed new head coach of Tweede Divisie club Lisse. In February 2024, despite disappointing results, he extended his contract with the club until 2025.

== Honours ==
Twente

- KNVB Cup Winner 2000–01
