= Anthony Lurling =

Dutch footballer

Personal information
- Full name: Anthonius Petrus Lurling
- Date of birth: 22 April 1977 (age 49)
- Place of birth: Tilburg, Netherlands
- Height: 1.73 m (5 ft 8 in)
- Position: Attacking midfielder

Youth career
- Hertogstad
- BVV Den Bosch

Senior career*
Years	Team	Apps	(Gls)
1994–1999	Den Bosch	135	(56)
1999–2002	SC Heerenveen	94	(36)
2002–2005	Feyenoord	57	(8)
2004–2005	→ NAC Breda (loan)	29	(4)
2005–2007	1. FC Köln	12	(0)
2006	→ RKC Waalwijk (loan)	14	(1)
2006–2007	→ Den Bosch (loan)	19	(5)
2007–2014	NAC Breda	190	(33)
2014	SC Heerenveen	5	(0)
2014–2016	Den Bosch	31	(5)
Total		586	(148)

International career
1997–2000	Netherlands U21	8	(4)
- * Club domestic league appearances and goals

Anthonius Petrus Lurling (born 22 April 1977), simply known as Anthony Lurling (pronounced [ˈɑntoːni ˈlʏrlɪŋ]), is a Dutch former professional footballer who played as an attacking midfielder.

Lurling played for high level clubs like Feyenoord, NAC Breda and 1. FC Köln. For the Jong Oranje team he earned eight caps between 1997 and 2000.

He is the grandson of late footballer Piet van Overbeek.

== Honours ==
Den Bosch

- Eerste Divisie: 1998–99

SC Heerenveen

- Eredivisie runner-up: 1999–2000
