= Richal Leitoe =

Personal information
- Full name: Richal Leitoe
- Date of birth: 19 April 1983 (age 43)
- Place of birth: Willemstad, Curaçao, Netherlands Antilles
- Height: 1.71 m (5 ft 7 in)
- Position: Striker

Team information
- Current team: HFC EDO Zaterdag

Senior career*
Years	Team	Apps	(Gls)
2003–2005	FC Utrecht	29	(3)
2005–2007	FC Den Bosch	34	(3)
2007–2008	FC Lisse		
2008–2013	Rijnsburgse Boys	29	(6)
2013–2014	Excelsior Maassluis	14	(3)
2014–2015	Deltasport		
2015–2016	EDO Zaterdag		
2016–2017	Sparta Rotterdam Amateur		
2017–	EDO Zaterdag		
- * Club domestic league appearances and goals

Richal Leitoe (born 19 April 1983 in Willemstad, Curaçao, in the former Netherlands Antilles) is a football player who plays for HFC EDO Zaterdag.

He played for two seasons at FC Utrecht before joining FC Den Bosch in 2005. He returned to amateur football in 2007.

He was call-up to national team for 2010 FIFA World Cup qualification in March 2008.

== Honours ==
Utrecht

- KNVB Cup: 2003–04
