= Jorge Acuña =

Chilean footballer and manager (born 1978)

Personal information
- Full name: Jorge Cristian Acuña Concha
- Date of birth: 31 July 1978 (age 48)
- Place of birth: Ovalle, Chile
- Height: 1.78 m (5 ft 10 in)
- Position: Midfielder

Youth career
- Unión Española

Senior career*
Years	Team	Apps	(Gls)
1999	Unión Española	37	(1)
2000–2002	Universidad Católica	74	(0)
2003–2006	Feyenoord	15	(0)
2004–2005	→ Universidad Católica (loan)	38	(2)
2005–2006	→ Roosendaa (loan)	24	(0)
2007	Universidad de Chile	16	(0)
2007–2009	Mamelodi Sundowns	35	(0)
2009	Ñublense	12	(0)
2010–2015	Unión San Felipe	55	(0)
2013	→ Rangers (loan)	12	(0)
2015–2016	Cobresal	8	(0)
2017	Unión San Felipe	6	(0)
Total		332	(3)

International career
2003–2006	Chile	16	(0)

Managerial career
- 2018: Santa María U17 (city team)
- 2020–2021: Unión San Felipe (youth)
- 2020–2021: Unión San Felipe (assistant)
- 2021: Unión San Felipe
- 2023: Santiago City
- * Club domestic league appearances and goals

Jorge Cristian Acuña Concha (born 31 July 1978), also known by his nickname Kike Acuña, is a Chilean football manager and former player who played as a midfielder.

== Club career ==
Born in Ovalle, IV Region of Coquimbo, Acuña joined Santiago–based club Unión Española youth set-up where was promoted to the first adult team in 1999. After spending a season with the Spaniards, in January 2000, he moved to powerhouse Universidad Católica where he helped the club to win the 2002 Torneo Apertura, being a key playing in the title earning.

In 2002, Acuña signed a contract with Dutch club Feyenoord. Following a Feyenoord Reserve match on 15 April 2004, he and other Feyenoord players, including Robin van Persie, were attacked by AFC Ajax hooligans. Acuña was taken to the hospital with head, neck and rib injuries. Then he joined on loan to RBC Roosendaal to play the 2005–06 Eredivisie season. After completing 24 league appearances, Acuña finished his spell at North Brabant and later was released from Feyenoord in January 2006 which didn't renew his contract.

After months as a free agent he was on trial at English clubs Blackburn Rovers and Wigan Athletic. However, on 23 January 2007, Acuña finally signed for Universidad de Chile, Católica's cross town rivals. He arrived to the club during an institutional crisis, only playing 16 league games and then being fired by coach Arturo Salah after missing a training.

On 8 August 2007, it was reported that Acuña moved to South African side Mamelodi Sundowns of the Premier Soccer League. After two seasons playing at The Brazilians, he decided to left them after differences with club's chairman Patrice Motsepe who according Acuña discriminated him for be white.

After leaving Unión San Felipe, on 2018 he played for both Rebeldes F.C. and Las Higueras de Santa María at amateur level.

== Managerial career ==
After coaching the under-17 football team of the commune Santa María, on 2020 he began his managerial career as manager of Unión San Felipe at under-17 level. In November 2020, after Unión San Felipe changed his technical staff, Acuña became assistant coach of Héctor Roco, the manager of the first team.

On 28 April 2021, he took the challenge of coaching Unión San Felipe as a caretaker manager after Tomás Arrotea was released, being later ratified on 26 May 26, 2021, and released on August of the same year.

For the 2023 season, he signed with Santiago City FC in the Chilean Tercera A.

== Personal life ==
His cousin, Diego Abarca, is an American soccer player who is the son of his cousin, Sandra Ramírez, and the former Chilean professional footballer José Abarca.

In 2016, Acuña was a candidate to councillor for San Felipe commune.

In October 2025, Acuña entered the dance TV show Fiebre de Baile (Dance Fever) from Chilevisión.

Acuña owns a Panini store in Pirque, Chile.

== Career statistics ==
=== International ===
Appearances and goals by national team and year
National team	Year	Apps	Goals
Chile	2003	5	0
Chile	2004	1	0
Chile	2005	4	0
Chile	2006	6	0
Total		16	0

== Honours ==
=== Player ===
Universidad Católica

- Primera División de Chile: 2002 Apertura
