= Patrick Paauwe =

Dutch footballer

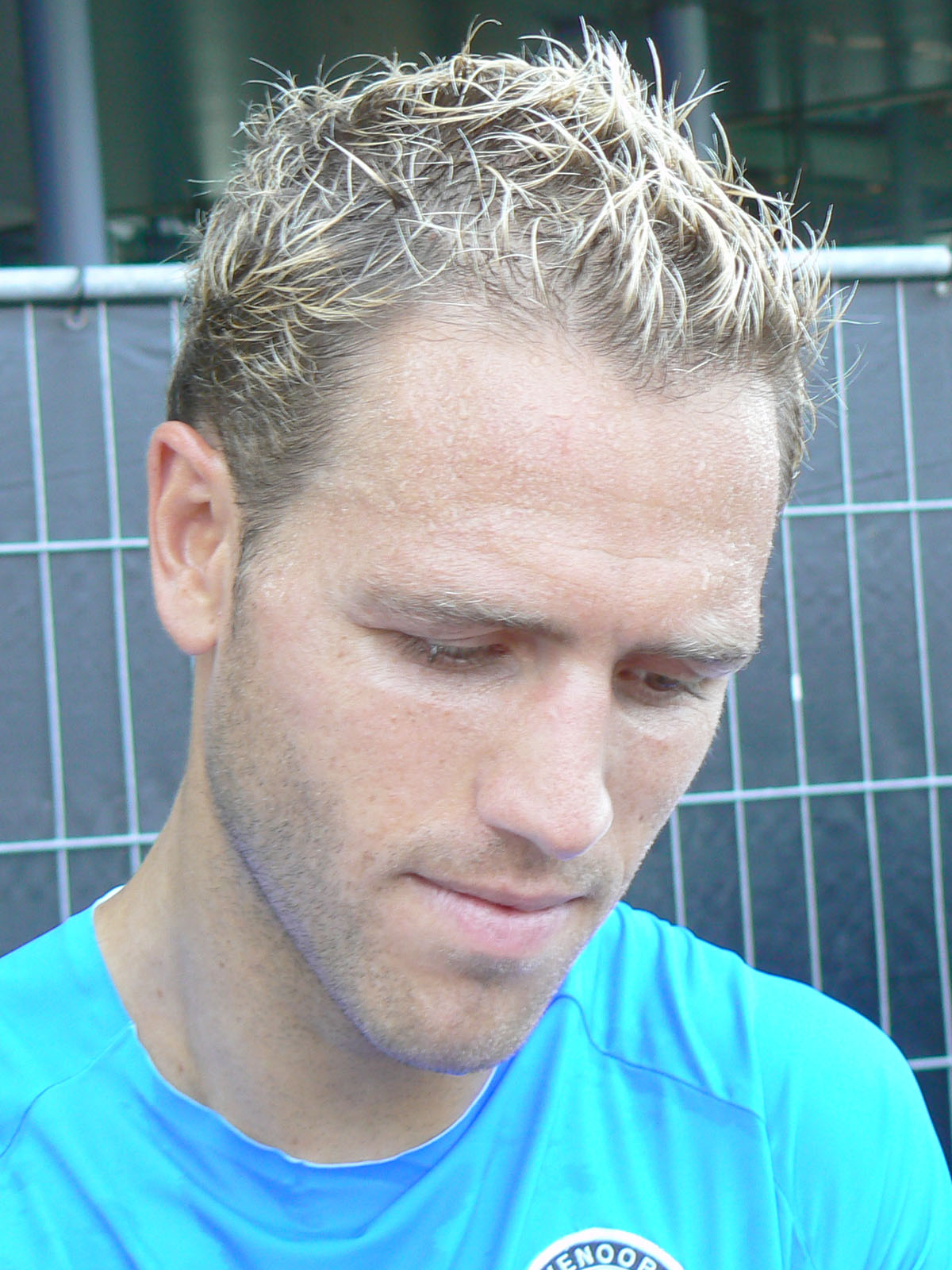
- Paauwe in 2006

Personal information
- Date of birth: 27 December 1975 (age 50)
- Place of birth: Dronten, Netherlands
- Height: 1.83 m (6 ft 0 in)
- Positions: Defensive midfielder; centre-back

Youth career
- ASVD
- DVC
- Lyra
- 't Harde

Senior career*
Years	Team	Apps	(Gls)
1993–1995	PSV	2	(0)
1995–1996	De Graafschap	23	(0)
1996–1998	Fortuna Sittard	61	(6)
1998–2006	Feyenoord	229	(25)
2006–2007	Valenciennes	29	(1)
2007–2009	Borussia Mönchengladbach	57	(4)
2009–2011	VVV-Venlo	50	(2)
Total		451	(38)

International career
2000–2002	Netherlands	5	(0)
- * Club domestic league appearances and goals

Patrick Paauwe (Dutch pronunciation: [ˈpɛtrɪk ˈpʌu.ə]; born 27 December 1975) is a Dutch former professional footballer who played as a defensive midfielder or centre-back.

== Club career ==
Paauwe played as a centre-back in the past but for Feyenoord Rotterdam as a defensive midfielder role. Other teams he served are PSV Eindhoven, De Graafschap, Fortuna Sittard, Valenciennes FC and VVV Venlo. Paauwe is a one-time winner of the Dutch Eredivisie (in 1999) and the UEFA Cup (in 2002), both with Feyenoord. After two years with Borussia Mönchengladbach, he returned to his native Netherlands and signed for VVV-Venlo. He retired from professional football on 31 January 2011.

== International career ==
Paauwe has been capped five times by the Netherlands national team.

== Personal life ==
His brother Cees Paauwe is also a former professional footballer.

== Career statistics ==
=== International ===
Appearances and goals by national team and year
National team	Year	Apps	Goals
Netherlands	2000	1	0
Netherlands	2001	2	0
Netherlands	2002	2	0
Total		5	0

== Honours ==
Feyenoord

- Eredivisie: 1998–99
- Johan Cruyff Shield: 1999
- UEFA Cup: 2001–02
