= 1949 Dutch Supercup =

SVV	Quick 1888
2	0
- Date: 25 June 1949
- Venue: Goffertstadion, Nijmegen
- Referee: H.J. van Laar (Zutphen)
- Attendance: 20,000

The inaugural Dutch Supercup (Dutch: Nederlandse Supercup) was held on 25 June 1949 at the Goffertstadion in Nijmegen. The match featured the 1948–49 winners of the league title SVV, and, the winners of the 1948–49 KNVB Cup, Quick 1888. Both goals were scored in the second half.

The match was held to commemorate the forty-year existence of the Nijmegen section of the KNVB. There would not be another Dutch Supercup held until 1991.

== Match details ==
25 June 1949
19:00

SVV	2–0	Quick 1888
Schrumpf; Könemann

Goffertstadion, Nijmegen
Attendance: 20,000
Referee: H.J. Laar (Zutphen)

SVV
GK	(Netherlands) Henk Opschoor
(Netherlands) André Corveleijn
(Netherlands) Frans Steenbergen
(Netherlands) Flip van Kan
MF	(Netherlands) Jan van Schijndel
(Netherlands) Joop van Meerwijk
(Netherlands) Jan Schrumpf
(Netherlands) Arie van Lith
(Netherlands) Arij de Bruijn
(Netherlands) Henk Könemann
(Netherlands) Rinus Gosens
Substitutes:
Manager:
(Netherlands) v. Lith

Quick 1888
GK	(Netherlands) A. van Wayenburg
(Netherlands) W. Maalssen
(Netherlands) E. de Vos
(Netherlands) J. Paauwen
(Netherlands) P. Kruitbosch
(Netherlands) Fr. van Es
(Netherlands) Han Engelsman
(Netherlands) A. de Ligt
(Netherlands) Fr. van Rooy
(Netherlands) J. Rozendaal
(Netherlands) P. Schipperheijn
Substitutes:
Manager:
(Netherlands) Schrumpf
