= Johan Cruyff Shield =

Association football tournament in the Netherlands

Johan Cruijff Schaal
- Organiser(s): Royal Dutch Football Association
- Founded: 1949; 1991–present
- Region: Netherlands
- Teams: 2
- Current champions: AZ (2nd title)
- Most championships: PSV (15 titles)
- Website: knvb.com/johan-cruyff-shield
- 2026 Johan Cruyff Shield

The Johan Cruyff Shield (Dutch: Johan Cruijff Schaal, pronounced [ˌjoːɦɑŋ ˈkrœyf ˌsxaːl]) is a football trophy in the Netherlands named after Dutch footballer Johan Cruyff, also often referred to as the Dutch Super Cup. The winner is decided in one match only, played by the winner of the national football league, Eredivisie, and the winner of the national KNVB Cup. In the event of a team winning both the Eredivisie and the KNVB Cup, the Johan Cruyff Shield will be contested between that team and the runner up in the national league.

== The trophy ==
The trophy is a silver plate with a 60-centimetre diameter. It is similar to the trophies received by the champions of the Eredivisie. The engraved text on the trophy is as follows:

- Border, top: "Johan Cruijff Schaal X" (or: "Johan Cruyff Trophy X", so Cruijff with 'ij' as opposed to the international spelling using a 'y' and a number in Roman numerals)
- Centre: "KNVB 31-7-2008" (KNVB standing for "Koninklijke Nederlandse Voetbal Bond" or "Royal Dutch Football Association" followed by the date of the match)
- Border, bottom: "Ajax – FC Twente" (the teams playing the match, with the champion of the national league named second)

== History ==
=== Super Cup ===
The first Super Cup match was played on 25 June 1949. The league champions SVV beat cup winners Quick 1888 2–0.

The Dutch FA brought back the competition in 1991 under the name PTT Telecom Cup, with the match always being played in the De Kuip stadium in Rotterdam. After three years, sponsor PTT Telecom retreated and the name Super Cup was reinstated.

=== Johan Cruyff Shield ===
In 1996 the format was changed to the current set-up and played in the Amsterdam Arena under the name Johan Cruyff Schaal (Dutch for Johan Cruyff Shield).

In 2003, the supporters of both teams, namely FC Utrecht and PSV Eindhoven, were unhappy with the set-up and stayed away from the stadium. The Utrecht fans complained about protocols concerning their travel to Amsterdam (strict rules imposed for the threat of hooliganism) and the PSV fans were dissatisfied with the seats assigned to them. Only 700 of the 13,000 available tickets were sold. The prize money in 2003 amounted to €135,000.

The contestants in 2004 were Ajax and FC Utrecht. Utrecht won with a final score of 4–2 after trailing 1–2 up until the 85th minute of the match. Thirty-three thousand spectators witnessed the most remarkable comeback in the trophy's history.

Because PSV won both the national championship and the cup in 2005, Ajax (who had finished second in the league) formed the opposition and won 2–1.

Starting from 2017, the match is played in the stadium of the Eredivisie champions.

In 2020, the match for the Johan Cruijff Schaal was cancelled due to the worldwide COVID-19 pandemic.

== Results ==
=== Super Cup ===
Year	Winners	Scorers	Score	Scorers	Runners-up
1949	SVV	Schrumpf (?); Könemann (?)	2–0	–	Quick 1888
1991	Feyenoord	Damaschin 10'	1–0	–	PSV Eindhoven
1992	PSV Eindhoven	E. Koeman 25'	1–0	–	Feyenoord
1993	Ajax	Litmanen 18', 62'; F. de Boer 47'; Overmars 61'	4–0	–	Feyenoord
1994	Ajax	Litmanen 13'; Oulida 21'; Kluivert 25'	3–0	–	Feyenoord
1995	Ajax	R. de Boer 25'; Kluivert 102'	2–1 (a.e.t.)	Larsson 27'	Feyenoord

=== Johan Cruyff Shield ===
Year	Winners	Scorers	Score	Scorers	Runners-up
1996	PSV Eindhoven	Eijkelkamp 48'; Degryse 61', 78'	3–0	–	Ajax
1997	PSV Eindhoven	Cocu 23', 90+1'; De Bilde 90+2'	3–1	Van Houdt 84'	Roda JC
1998	PSV Eindhoven	Khokhlov 23'; Bruggink 53'	2–0	–	Ajax
1999	Feyenoord	Tomasson 13'; Kalou 15'; Paauwe 86'	3–2	Knopper 45'; Grønkjær 53'	Ajax
2000	PSV Eindhoven	Ramzi 29'; Faber 44'	2–0	–	Roda JC
2001	PSV Eindhoven	Kežman 4'; Bruggink 20'; Rommedahl 71'	3–2	De Witte 34'; Van der Doelen 89'	Twente
2002	Ajax	Van der Vaart 41', 76'; Mido 54'	3–1	Kežman 10'	PSV Eindhoven
2003	PSV Eindhoven	Robben 14'; Van Bommel 47'; Kežman 88'	3–1	Van de Haar 21'	FC Utrecht
2004	FC Utrecht	Schut 72'; Somers 87', 90+1'; Douglas 90+5'	4–2	Pienaar 51'; Sneijder 80'	Ajax
2005	Ajax	Boukhari 72'; Babel 78'	2–1	Bouma 51'	PSV Eindhoven
2006	Ajax	Rosales 7'; Perez 69'; Sneijder 82'	3–1	Cocu 48'	PSV Eindhoven
2007	Ajax	Gabri 43'	1–0	–	PSV Eindhoven
2008	PSV Eindhoven	Lazović 55'; Marcellis 67'	2–0	–	Feyenoord
2009	AZ	Holman 15'; El Hamdaoui 24'; Martens 28'; Lens 67', 87'	5–1	Papadopulos 60'	SC Heerenveen
2010	Twente	L. de Jong 8'	1–0	–	Ajax
2011	Twente	Janko 21'; Ruiz 68'	2–1	Alderweireld 54'	Ajax
2012	PSV Eindhoven	Toivonen 3', 53'; Lens 12'; Wijnaldum 90'	4–2	Alderweireld 44'; Marcelo 75' (o.g.)	Ajax
2013	Ajax	Gouweleeuw 69' (o.g.); Sigþórsson 75'; S. de Jong 103'	3–2 (a.e.t.)	Guðmundsson 51'; Jóhannsson 67'	AZ
2014	PEC Zwolle	Nijland 54'	1–0	–	Ajax
2015	PSV Eindhoven	L. de Jong 25', 64'; Maher 50'	3–0	–	FC Groningen
2016	PSV Eindhoven	Pröpper 38'	1–0	–	Feyenoord
2017	Feyenoord	Toornstra 7'	1–1 (4–2 pen.)	Büttner 58'	Vitesse
2018	Feyenoord		0–0 (6–5 pen.)		PSV Eindhoven
2019	Ajax	Dolberg 1'; Blind 53'	2–0	–	PSV Eindhoven
2020	Cancelled due to COVID-19 pandemic in the Netherlands				
2021	PSV Eindhoven	Madueke 2', 29'; Vertessen 76'; Götze 89'	4–0	–	Ajax
2022	PSV Eindhoven	Til 32', 45+2', 69'; Gakpo 65'; Simons 90+1'	5–3	Bergwijn 15'; Antony 54'; Kudus 72'	Ajax
2023	PSV Eindhoven	Lang 79'	1–0	–	Feyenoord
2024	Feyenoord	Giménez 29', 54'; Nieuwkoop 33'; Milambo 72'	4–4 (4–2 pen.)	Lang 9'; De Jong 48', 80'; Til 65'	PSV Eindhoven
2025	PSV Eindhoven	Nauber 78' (o.g.); Dest 84'	2–1	Suray 35'	Go Ahead Eagles
2026	AZ	Meerdink 25'; Patati 51'; Dijkstra 58'; Daal 66' (pen.)	4–0	–	PSV Eindhoven

== Winners by club ==
The performance of various clubs is shown in the following table:

Club	Won	Lost	Years won	Years runners-up
PSV Eindhoven	15	9	1992, 1996, 1997, 1998, 2000, 2001, 2003, 2008, 2012, 2015, 2016, 2021, 2022, 2023, 2025	1991, 2002, 2005, 2006, 2007, 2018, 2019, 2024, 2026
Ajax	9	10	1993, 1994, 1995, 2002, 2005, 2006, 2007, 2013, 2019	1996, 1998, 1999, 2004, 2010, 2011, 2012, 2014, 2021, 2022
Feyenoord	5	7	1991, 1999, 2017, 2018, 2024	1992, 1993, 1994, 1995, 2008, 2016, 2023
Twente	2	1	2010, 2011	2001
AZ	2	1	2009, 2026	2013
Utrecht	1	1	2004	2003
SVV	1	–	1949	–
PEC Zwolle	1	–	2014	–
Roda JC	–	2	–	1997, 2000
Quick	–	1	–	1949
Heerenveen	–	1	–	2009
Groningen	–	1	–	2015
Vitesse	–	1	–	2017
Go Ahead Eagles	–	1	–	2025

== See also ==
- Big Three (Netherlands)
