= Felix von Heijden =

Dutch footballer and mayor

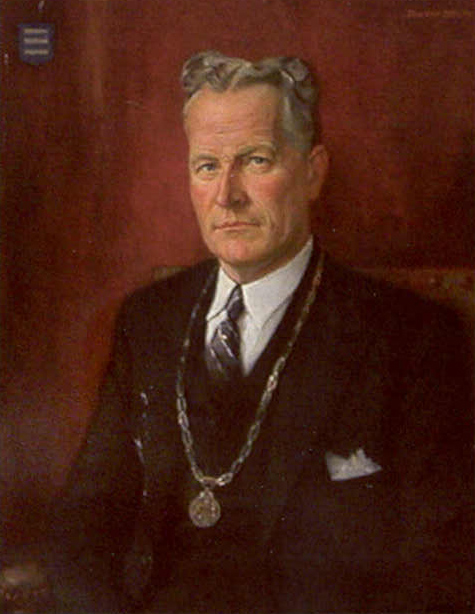

Personal information
- Full name: Herman Carel Felix Clotilde von Heijden
- Date of birth: 11 April 1890
- Place of birth: Weerselo, Netherlands
- Date of death: 17 November 1982 (aged 92)
- Place of death: Boxtel, Netherlands
- Position: Inside left

Senior career*
Years	Team	Apps	(Gls)
1908-1920	Quick 1888		
1920-1921	HVV Helmond		
1921-1923	Quick 1888		

International career
1920	Netherlands	1	(0)
- * Club domestic league appearances and goals

Olympic medal record

Men's Football
Bronze medal – third place	1920 Antwerp	Team competition

Herman Carel Felix Clotilde von Heijden (11 April 1890 in Weerselo – 17 November 1982 in Boxtel) was a football player from the Netherlands. He also was Dutch national champion in men's doubles tennis in 1918.

== Club career ==
Born in a wealthy family in Weerselo, where his father was mayor, Von Heijden moved to Nijmegen with his mother and brother and started playing football for Quick 1888. He made his senior debut at 18 years. He was one of only two Quick 1888 players who ever played for the Oranje, the other being Han Engelsman. A big inside-left, von Heijden is also named as the first Dutch international player from Helmond.

== International career ==
He represented his home country at the 1920 Summer Olympics. There he won the bronze medal with the Netherlands national football team, earning his only cap in the third-place playoff against Spain. He was also present at the 1912 Summer Olympics although he did not play and therefore received no medal.

== Personal life ==
Von Heijden also was an entrepreneur and became part-owner of a textile factory in Helmond. During his tenure in Helmond, he and his brother were raised to the nobility. Later he became mayor of Rosmalen, North Brabant (1923–1955). He was married and had four children and died in Huize Lindenlust in Boxtel in 1982.
