= Tarik Oulida =

Dutch footballer

Personal information
- Date of birth: 19 January 1974 (age 52)
- Place of birth: Amsterdam, Netherlands
- Height: 1.76 m (5 ft 9 in)
- Position: Midfielder

Senior career*
Years	Team	Apps	(Gls)
1992–1995	Ajax	18	(3)
1995–1998	Sevilla	44	(4)
1998–2002	Nagoya Grampus Eight	87	(10)
2002–2003	Sedan Ardennes	22	(1)
2003	Consadole Sapporo	13	(1)
2004	ADO Den Haag	8	(0)
Total		192	(19)
- * Club domestic league appearances and goals

Tarik Oulida (born 19 January 1974) is a Dutch former professional footballer who played as a midfielder. He played for Ajax (1992–1995), Sevilla (1995–1998), Nagoya Grampus Eight (1998–2002), Sedan Ardennes (2002–2003), Consadole Sapporo (2003), and ADO Den Haag (2004).

== Personal life ==
Born in Amsterdam, Netherlands, Oulida is of Moroccan descent and holds both Dutch and Moroccan nationalities. Raised in Amsterdam-West near the Balboaplein, his parents are both from Casablanca, Morocco.

In November 2023, Oulida was convicted in Marbella, Spain of sexually abusing his daughter in 2011. De Telegraaf reported that he was given a prison sentence of two and a half years, while Algemeen Dagblad reported that this sentence had been commuted and that he was instead deported from Spain.

In November 2023, Oulida reached a settlement in the court in Malaga in a case about the sexual abuse of his adopted daughter. He was sentenced to a suspended sentence in which he is not allowed to enter Spanish territory for ten years and must also pay a sum of €10,000. In return, his ex-partner, who initiated the case and with whom he is involved in a long-term conflict, refrains from further legal action. Oulida denies the abuse.

== Career statistics ==
Appearances and goals by club, season and competition
Club	Season	League			National cup		League cup		Continental		Other		Total	
Club	Season	Division	Apps	Goals	Apps	Goals	Apps	Goals	Apps	Goals	Apps	Goals	Apps	Goals
Ajax	1992–93	Eredivisie	6	1			–		0	0	–		6	1
Ajax	1993–94	Eredivisie	10	2			–		1	0	–		11	2
Ajax	1994–95	Eredivisie	2	0			–		1	2	1 (Note: Appearance in Dutch Super Cup)	1	4	3
Ajax	Total		18	3			0	0	2	2	1	1	21	6
Sevilla	1995–96	La Liga	5	0	0	0	–		0	0	–		5	0
Sevilla	1996–97	La Liga	10	3	0	0	–		0	0	–		10	3
Sevilla	1997–98	Segunda División	29	1	1	0	–		0	0	–		30	1
Sevilla	Total		44	4	1	0	0	0	0	0	0	0	45	4
Nagoya Grampus Eight	1998	J1 League	16	4	3	0	0	0					19	4
Nagoya Grampus Eight	1999	J1 League	22	2	5	2	5	0					32	4
Nagoya Grampus Eight	2000	J1 League	16	1	2	0	6	1					24	2
Nagoya Grampus Eight	2001	J1 League	28	2	1	0	5	1					34	3
Nagoya Grampus Eight	2002	J1 League	5	1	0	0	1	0					6	1
Nagoya Grampus Eight	Total		87	10	11	2	17	2					115	14
Sedan	2002–03	Ligue 1	22	1					–		–		22	1
Consadole Sapporo	2003	J2 League	13	1	0	0	–		–				13	1
ADO Den Haag	2003–04	Eredivisie	8	0			–		–		–		8	0
Career total			192	19	12	2	17	2	2	2	1	1	224	26

== Honours ==
Ajax

- Eredivisie: 1994–95, 1995–96
- KNVB Cup: 1992–93
- Dutch Supercup: 1995
- UEFA Champions League: 1994–95

Sevilla

- Trofeo Colombino: 1996

Nagoya Grampus Eight

- Emperor's Cup: 1999

Individual

- Ajax Talent of the Year (Marco van Basten Award): 1994
