= De Grolsch Veste =

Dutch football stadium

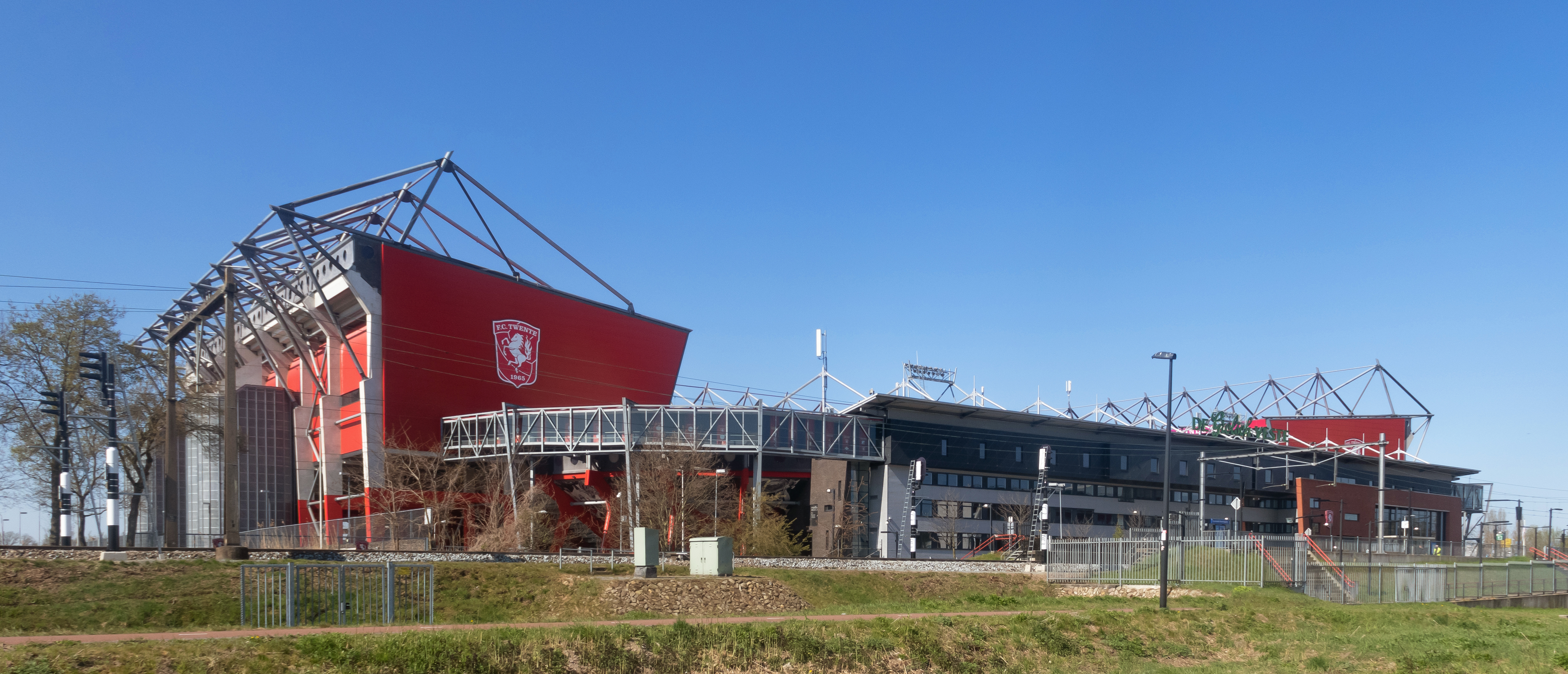
- Interactive map of De Grolsch Veste
- Full name: De Grolsch Veste
- Former names: Arke Stadion (1998–2008)
- Location: Colosseum 65; 7521 PP Enschede; Netherlands
- Coordinates: 52°14′12″N 6°50′15″E
- Owner: Twente
- Operator: Twente
- Capacity: 30,205
- Surface: Grass

Construction
- Groundbreaking: 31 January 1997
- Built: 1997–1998
- Opened: 10 May 1998
- Expanded: September 2008
- Cost: ƒ 33 million € 50 million (1st expansion)
- Architect: IAA Architecten
- Structural engineer: VolkerWessels
- Services engineer: Matrix Installatie Adviseurs

Tenants
- FC Twente (1998–present); FC Twente Women (selected matches) Netherlands national football team men/women (selected matches)

De Grolsch Veste (Dutch pronunciation: [də ˈɣrɔls ˌfɛstə]; (Note: Veste in isolation: [ˈvɛstə].) transl. "The Grolsch Fortress"), previously known as Arke Stadion (Dutch pronunciation: [ˈɑrkə ˌstaːdijɔn]), is the stadium of football club FC Twente. It is located in Enschede, Netherlands, at the Business & Science Park, near the University of Twente. The stadium has an all-seated capacity of 30,205 with a standard pitch heating system and has a promenade instead of fences around the stands. It hosted the final of the UEFA Women's Euro 2017.

== History ==
De Grolsch Veste replaced the old Diekman Stadion as FC Twente's home ground on 22 March 1998. Plans had been afoot to expand and to renovate the old and now demolished Diekman Stadion. However, with a growing fan capacity and with arguments that the location of the Diekman stadium was not strategic enough, the idea was conceived to build a new arena for the FC Twente fans. The Diekman ground also faced problems with its seating plans as a result of previous FIFA regulations which imposed a necessity to construct a seating tribune behind each goal post.

The cost of the construction is estimated to have been around 33 million guilders and it took fourteen months to complete, with its foundation stone having been laid on 31 January 1997. Due to the tight budget available, the layout of the stadium was constructed in such a way that future expansions would be possible without the necessity to tear down entire stands.

The first match played at the stadium was a 3–0 victory by the home team against PSV on 10 May 1998 in an Eredivisie match. The first goal in the new stadium was scored in the 14th minute by FC Twente player Chris De Witte.

On 1 October 2006, the stadium was updated with two big flatscreen video-walls.

In May 2008, the Arke Stadion was renamed to De Grolsch Veste with beer brewery Grolsch as sponsor. The brewery is located in the club's hometown Enschede. The name "Veste" (fortress) is a reference to Groenlo, a former fortified town that was often besieged and where Grolsch was first brewed.

On 5 September 2009, for the first time ever an international (friendly) match was played in the FC Twente stadium when the Netherlands beat Japan 3–0.

=== Expansion ===
In 2006, plans were unfolded to increase the stadium capacity to 24,000 seats. The expansion started in January 2008 and was completed in September 2008, just in time for the start of the 2008–2009 season.

FC Twente is aiming to start a new phase in the stadium expansion in the summer of 2011 which will result in a capacity of 32,000 seats.

As part of the combined Netherlands and Belgium bid to host the 2018 FIFA World Cup, the stadium was one of five stadiums in the Netherlands selected by the KNVB to host games. This would mean that the stadium capacity needed to be expanded to the minimum required seating of 44,000.

The city of Enschede announced on 11 September 2009 that it would officially be a candidate city and that it would fully support FC Twente's ambition to expand the stadium capacity to the minimum required seating of 44,000. In December 2009, IAA Architecten released computer generated images of the proposed 44,000+ stadium with an arched 3rd tier, to complete the main stand.

=== Roof collapse ===
The Grolsch Veste was expanded during the summer of 2011 after the proposal by Joop Munsterman in January 2009 to allow for a 2nd U-shaped ring and an extra capacity of 30,000. On 7 July, 2011 when working on the construction of the stand, the roof suddenly collapsed, killing two workers and injuring 14 people. The collapse took place on the short side of the stadium, where, amongst other things, the roof structure was built. The part where the second ring had already been completed did not collapse. According to Dutch sources, the collapse was due to a lack of essential parts that were needed for the roof, and a lack of understanding of this. After an investigation of a month, the roof was taken away and work continued. FC Twente played the first few competition matches partly without a roof. On 7 July, 2012, a monument was built at the place where the accident happened. The new stadium was officially opened on 29 October with a competition match against PSV Eindhoven (2-2). A year after the accident, a monument was unveiled.

== Gallery ==
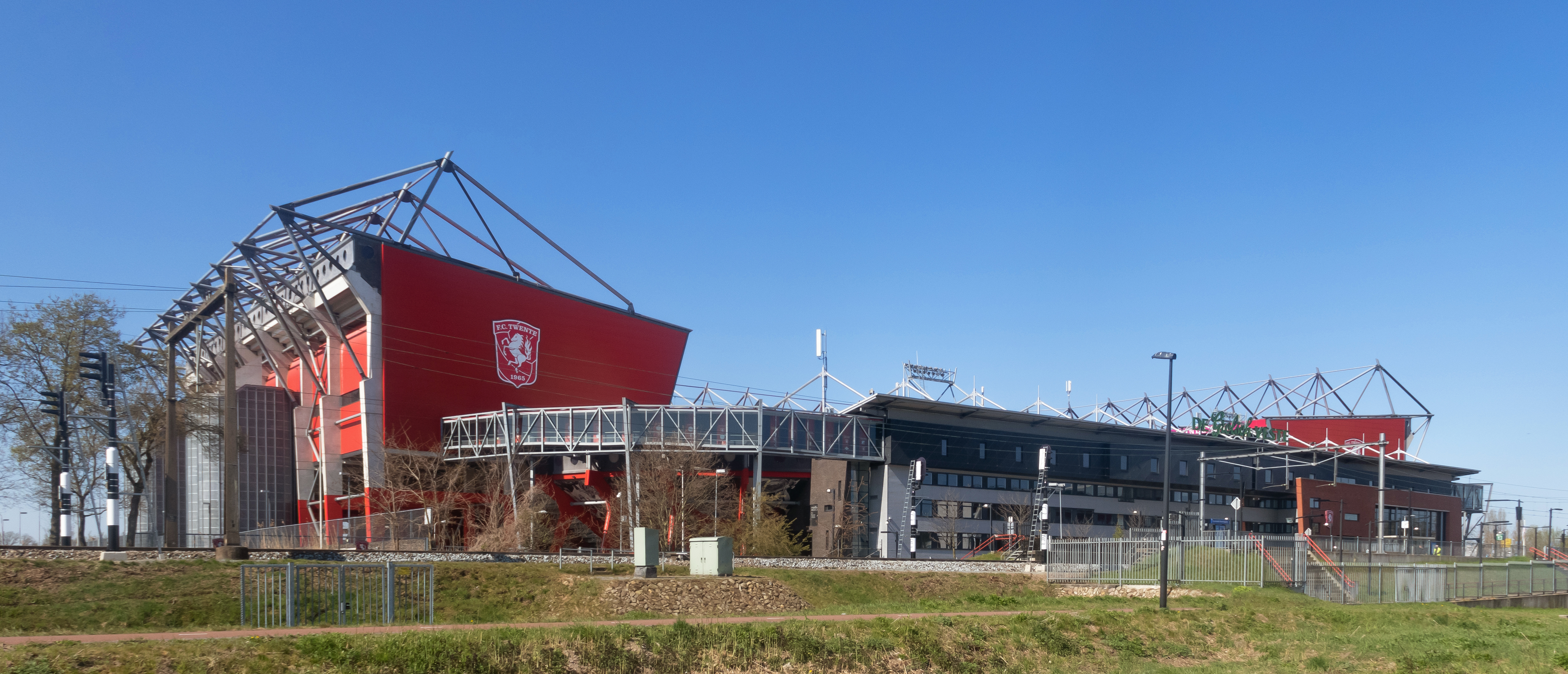
Enschede, the Grolsch Veste - football stadium of FC Twente

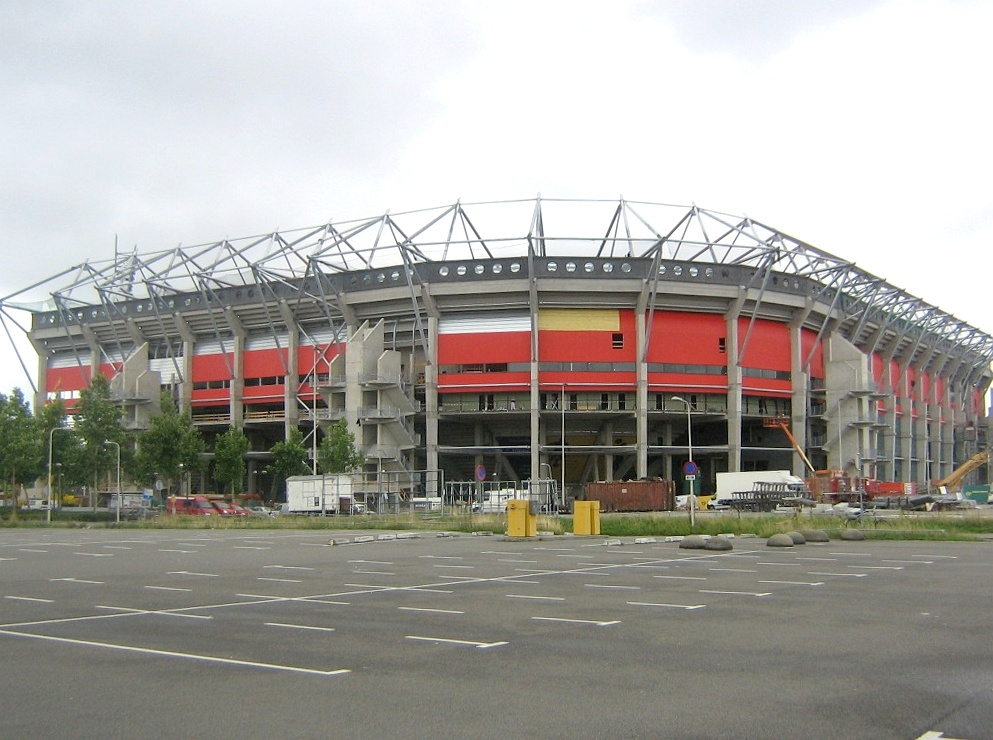
Outside view

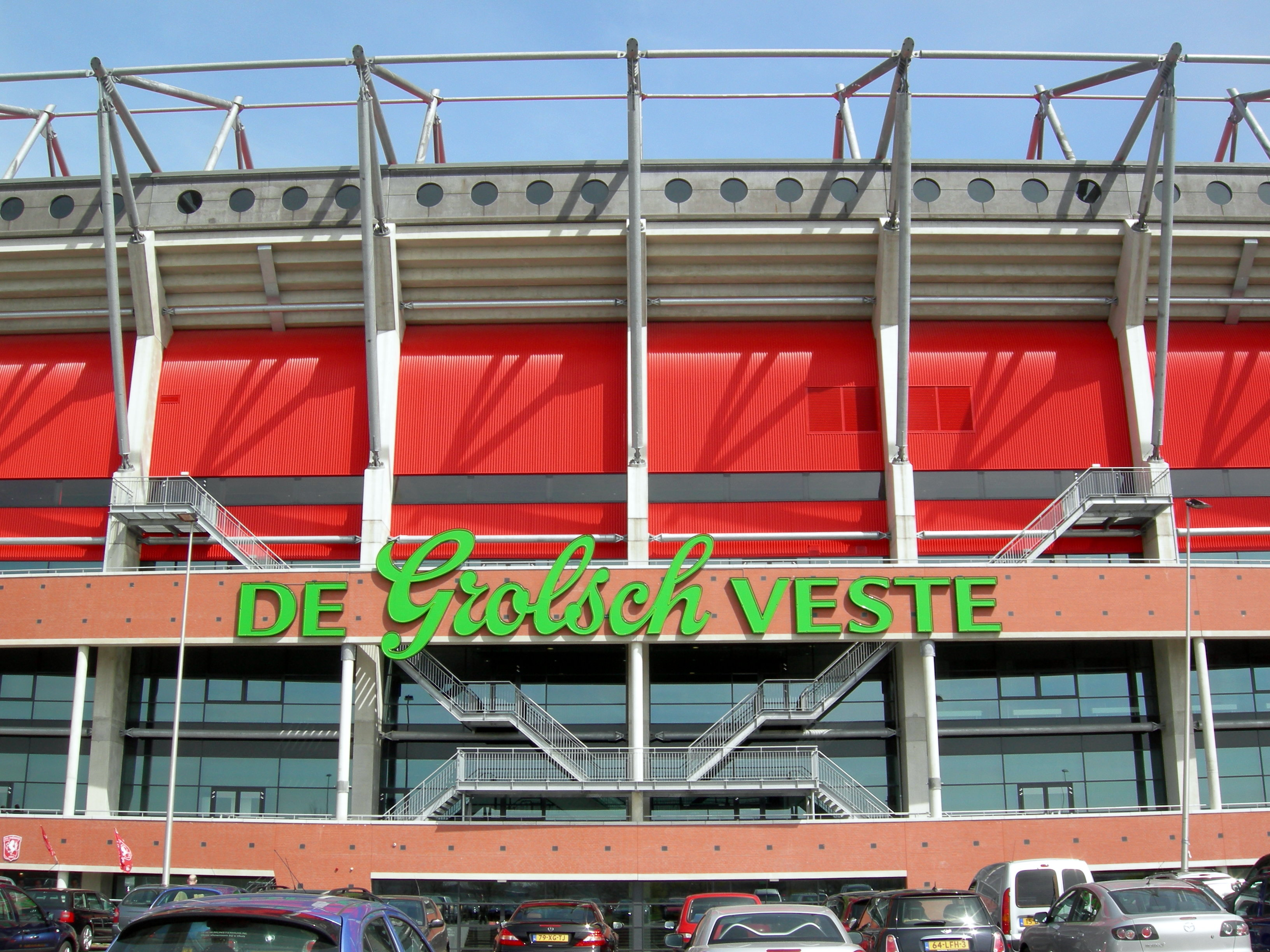
Main stand

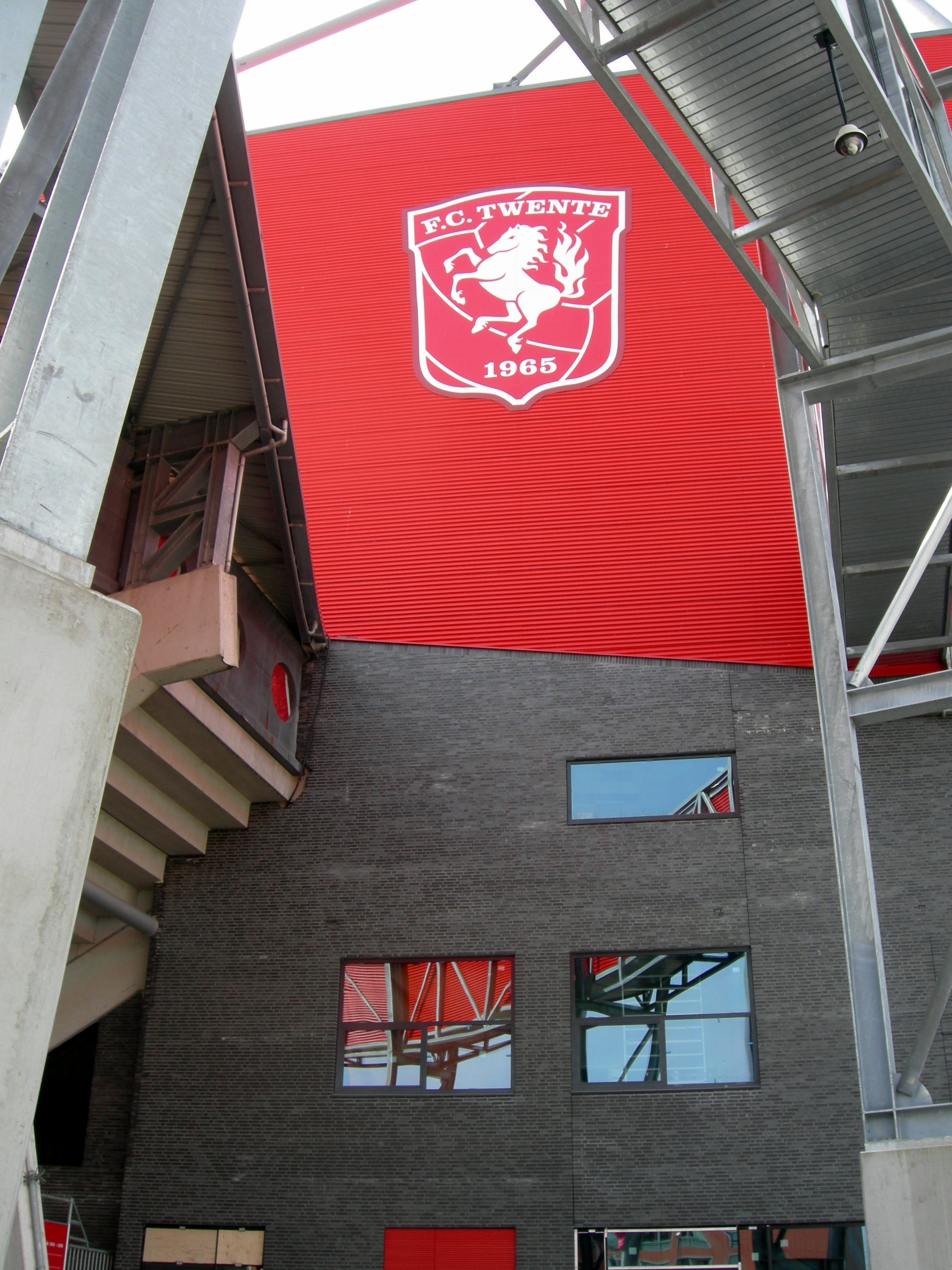
Outside corner

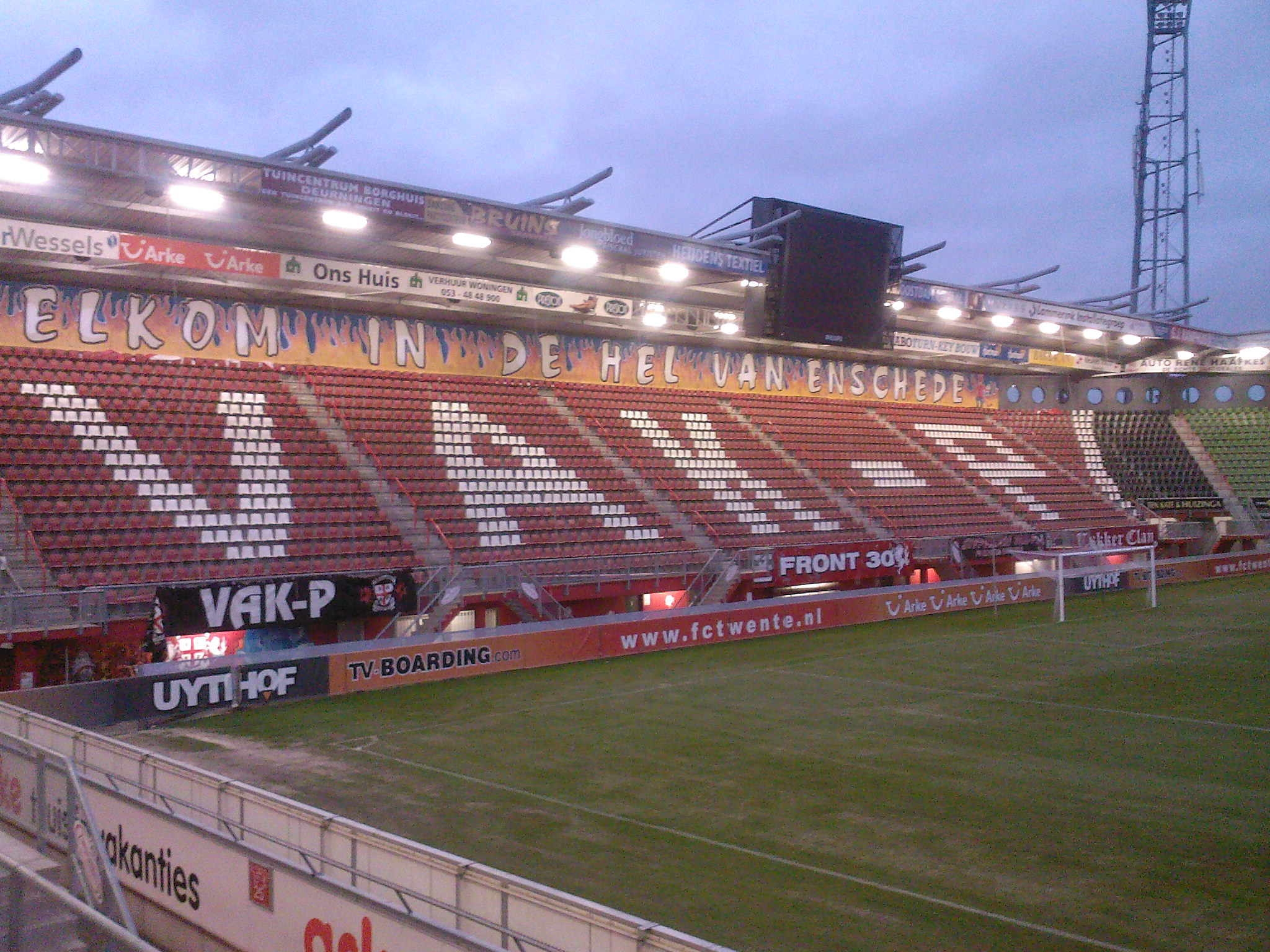
P-side

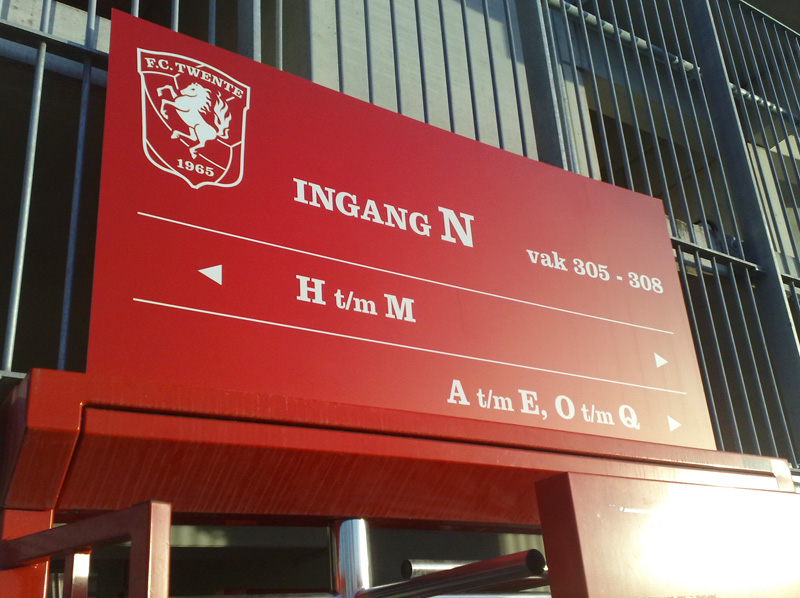
Sign

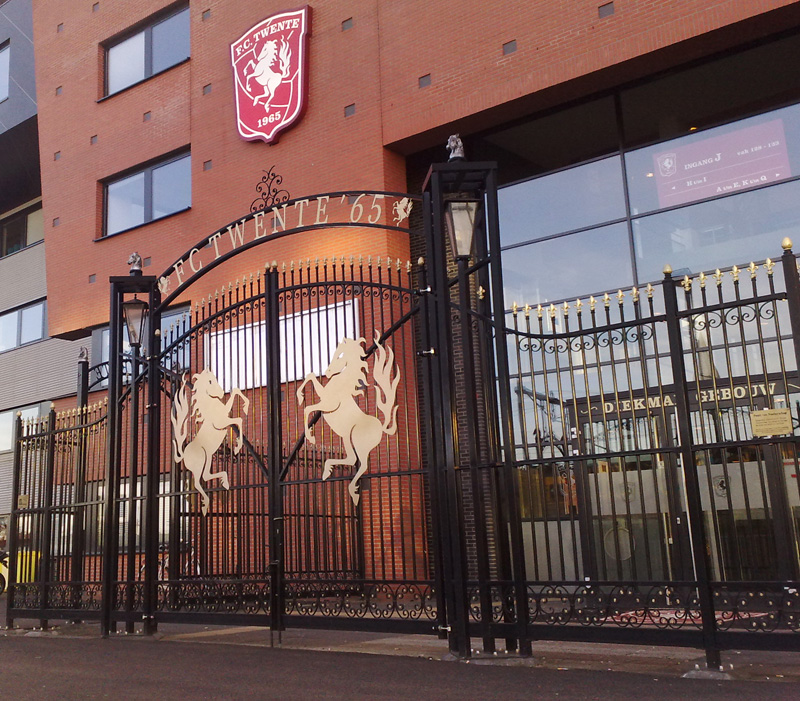
Noaberpoort

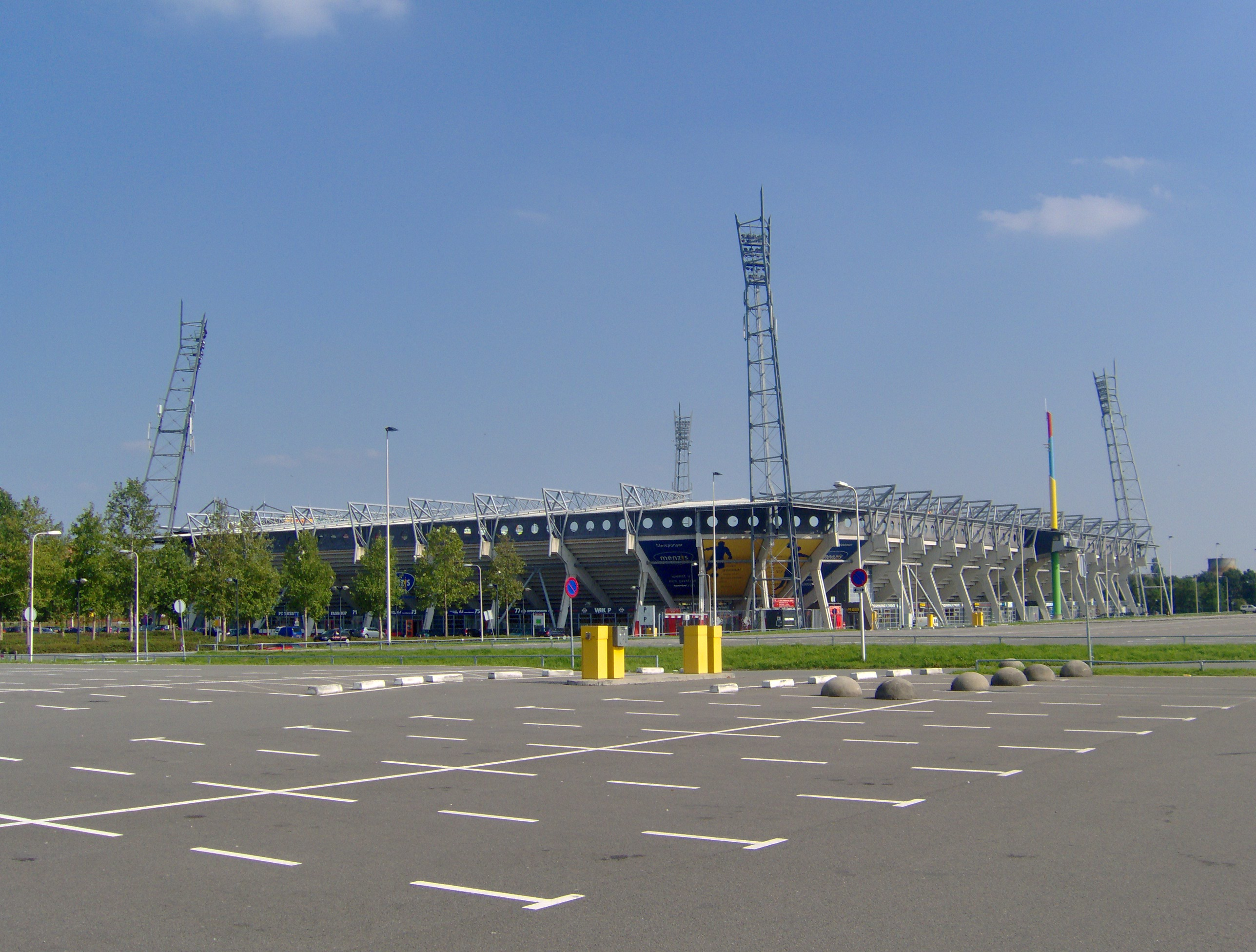
Previous Arke stadium

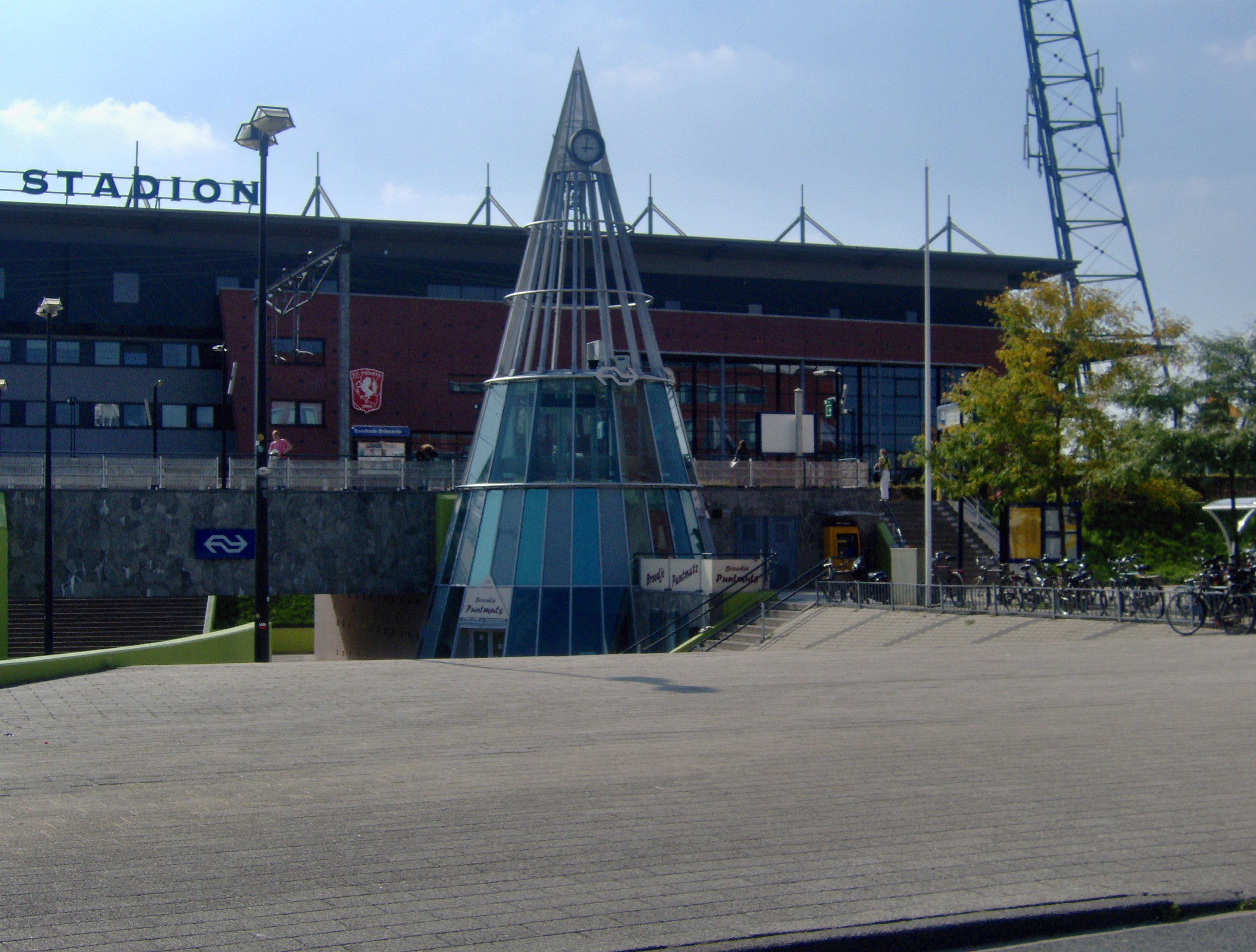
The Enschede Kennispark railway station next to the stadium

== See also ==
- List of football stadiums in the Netherlands
- Lists of stadiums

== Notes ==
Events
Preceded by Friends Arena; Solna	UEFA European Women's Championship; Final venue 2017	Succeeded by Wembley Stadium; London
Preceded by San Siro; Juventus Stadium	UEFA Nations League; Finals venue 2023 with De Kuip	Succeeded by Allianz Arena; MHPArena
