= 2001 Johan Cruyff Shield =

Johan Cruijff Schaal VI
PSV Eindhoven	FC Twente
3	2
- Date: 12 August 2001
- Venue: Amsterdam Arena, Amsterdam
- Referee: Roelof Luinge
- Attendance: 32,500

The sixth edition of the Johan Cruyff Shield (Dutch: Johan Cruijff Schaal) was held on 12 August 2001 between 2000–01 Eredivisie champions PSV Eindhoven and 2000–01 KNVB Cup winners FC Twente. PSV won the match 3–2.

== Match ==
=== Details ===
12 August 2001

PSV Eindhoven	3–2	FC Twente
Kežman 4'; Bruggink 10'; Rommedahl 71'		De Witte 35'; Van der Doelen 90'

Amsterdam Arena, Amsterdam
Attendance: 32,500
Referee: Roelof Luinge

PSV Eindhoven	FC Twente

GK	23	(Netherlands) Ronald Waterreus
RB	16	(Netherlands) Theo Lucius
CB	21	(Russia) Yuriy Nikiforov
CB	29	(Netherlands) Kevin Hofland
LB	22	(Netherlands) Wilfred Bouma	(yellow card) 41'
RM	19	(Denmark) Dennis Rommedahl
CM	6	(Netherlands) Mark van Bommel (c)
CM	14	(Switzerland) Johann Vogel		(substituted off) 77'
LM	7	(Morocco) Adil Ramzi		(substituted off) 57'
SS	10	(Netherlands) Arnold Bruggink		(substituted off) 57'
CF	9	(Federal Republic of Yugoslavia) Mateja Kežman	(yellow card) 90'
Substitutes:
MF	15	(Netherlands) John de Jong		(substituted in) 57'
FW	8	(Netherlands) Jan Vennegoor of Hesselink		(substituted in) 57'
DF	5	(Denmark) Jan Heintze		(substituted in) 77'
Manager:
(Belgium) Eric Gerets

GK	1	(Netherlands) Sander Boschker
RB	22	(Netherlands) Chris van der Weerden		(substituted off) 88'
CB	5	(Netherlands) Patrick Pothuizen
CB	3	(Federal Republic of Yugoslavia) Spira Grujić
LB	21	(Netherlands) Sjaak Polak
CM	17	(Netherlands) Björn van der Doelen
AM	7	(Belgium) Kurt Van De Paar		(substituted off) 75'
AM	10	(Netherlands) Arjan van der Laan (c)
RW	11	(Netherlands) Ellery Cairo		(substituted off) 73'
CF	8	(Scotland) Scott Booth
LW	14	(Belgium) Chris De Witte
Substitutes:
FW	28	(Sudan) Kingsley Kuali		(substituted in) 73'
DF	20	(Netherlands) Erik ten Hag		(substituted in) 75'
DF	2	(Netherlands) Dennis Hulshoff	(yellow card) 90'	(substituted in) 88'
Manager:
(Netherlands) John van 't Schip
