= Peet Geel =

Dutch footballer (1929–2017)

Personal information
- Date of birth: 24 November 1929
- Place of birth: Schiedam, Netherlands
- Date of death: 23 November 2017 (aged 87)
- Place of death: Roosendaal, Netherlands
- Position: Striker

Youth career
- SVDPW
- VDL

Senior career*
Years	Team	Apps	(Gls)
1952–1955	SVV	71	(33)
1955–1956	BVC Amsterdam	32	(19)
1956–1959	Sparta	50	(19)
1959–1960	Xerxes	21	(9)
1960–1961	AGOVV		
1961–1962	Hermes DVS	13	(6)

International career
1955	Netherlands	1	(0)
- * Club domestic league appearances and goals

Peter Geel (24 November 1929 – 23 November 2017) was a Dutch footballer. He played in one match for the Netherlands national football team in 1955.

Geel played for hometown sides SVV and Hermes DVS and played in the Eredivisie for Sparta.

Geel died on 23 November 2017, at the age of 87.
