= Rinus Gosens =

Dutch football manager (1920–2008)

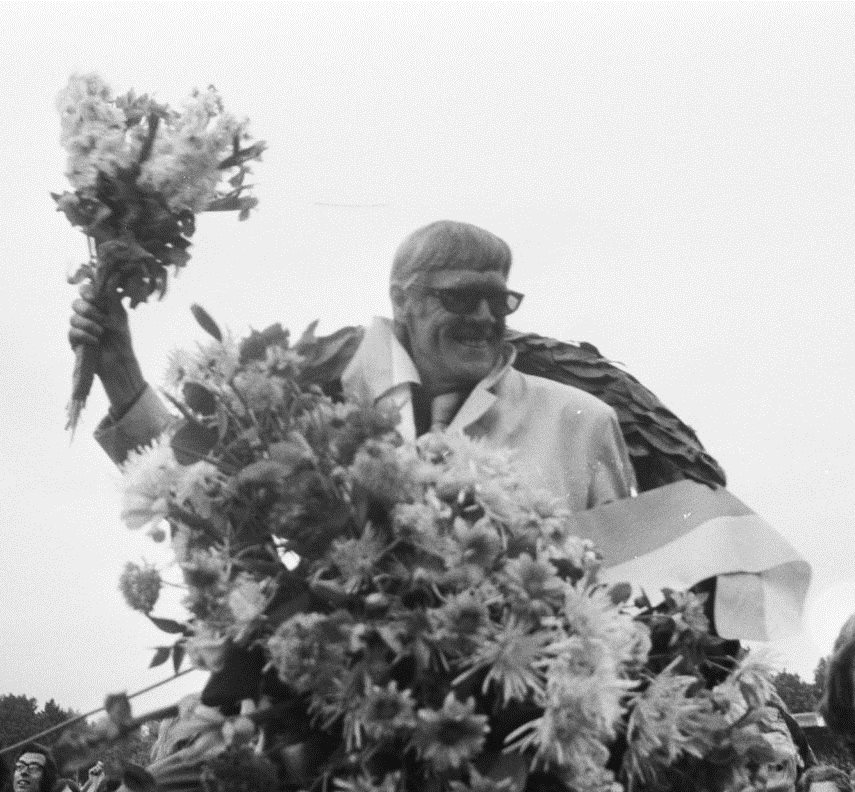
- Gosens in 1975

Personal information
- Full name: Marinus Pieter Gosens
- Date of birth: 1 January 1920
- Place of birth: Schiedam, Netherlands
- Date of death: 22 May 2008 (aged 88)
- Place of death: Schiedam, Netherlands
- Position: Inside left

Senior career*
Years	Team	Apps	(Gls)
1939-1954	SVV		

Managerial career
- 1961–1964: Fortuna Vlaardingen
- 1964–1970: SVV
- 1970–1972: Heracles
- 1972–1973: SVV
- 1973–1979: Eindhoven
- 1979–1980: FC Den Bosch
- * Club domestic league appearances and goals

Rinus Gosens (1 January 1920 – 22 May 2008) was a Dutch football player and manager. As a player, he won the Dutch championship with SVV in 1949 with Gosens scoring twice in the final.

After his playing career he became a football manager, who worked for Fortuna Vlaardingen, SVV, Heracles Almelo, FC Eindhoven and FC Den Bosch. He also worked as a scout for PSV. He died on 22 May 2008, aged 88.
