= SV SVV =

Dutch football club

- Full name: Sportvereniging Schiedamse Voetbal Verenigingen
- Founded: 1904; 122 years ago
- Ground: Stadion Harga; Schiedam, Netherlands
- League: Derde Klasse (Sunday); Vierde Klasse (Saturday)
Home colours

SV SVV, short for Sportvereniging Schiedamse Voetbal Verenigingen, is a Dutch football club from Schiedam.

Founded in 1904, the club won the Dutch national football title in 1949. In 1991, the professional branch of SVV and neighbouring Dordrecht'90 merged to form FC Dordrecht. SVV continues to play in amateur leagues.

== History ==
The club was founded in 1904 as Excelsior, which was renamed to Voorwaarts (Forward) two years later. The name was again changed, to SVV this time, when the club entered the Dutch national football competition. SVV was a people's club, and its players came mostly from the local residential area De Gorzen.

SVV won promotion to the Eerste Klasse, the highest national division at the time, in 1948. The first season at that level immediately saw the club winning the title. This allowed SVV to face other Eerste Klasse champions for the national title. The decisive match was played in Feijenoord Stadion in Rotterdam, on 4 June 1949. 69,300 Spectators saw SVV beat SC Heerenveen 3–1, making the club the national football champions 1948–1949. Among the players of this team were Jan van Schijndel, Frans Steenbergen, Jan Schrumpf, Arij de Bruijn, Henk Könemann and Rinus Gosens.

The national title would remain the club's only success. When professional football was introduced, SVV was one of the original teams of the Eredivisie. The club was relegated to the Eerste Divisie, the second tier of football in the Netherlands, two years later. The club was relegated to the Tweede Divisie in 1962 and won promotion there in 1966. Three seasons later, in 1969, SVV won the Eerste Divisie title, giving them promotion to the Eredivisie. The manager of that team was Rinus Gosens, who was a player when SVV won the national title in 1949. The club was relegated again after only one season and would spend the following nineteen seasons in the Eerste Divisie.

=== Near bankruptcy and merger ===
SVV appeared to go bankrupt in 1988, but local car salesman John van Dijk rescued the club. Wim Jansen became technical director, Dick Advocaat was appointed manager. The club won the Eerste Divisie title in 1990, and clinched promotion to the Eredivisie. As a part of the rescue, Van Dijk bought valuable players like Joop Hiele and Winston Bogarde. Because the stadium in Schiedam was deemed inappropriate for high-profile games, the club played such matches in the Feijenoord Stadion in Rotterdam. When the stadium couldn't be renovated, Van Dijk decided to merge SVV with Dordrecht'90, from neighbouring Dordrecht. The new club, called SVV/Dordrecht'90, played in the Eredivisie. Its home turf was the stadium of Dordrecht '90 in Dordrecht. The club's name was changed to Dordrecht'90 in 1992, and to FC Dordrecht in 2002.

=== SVV/SMC ===
After the merger, SVV continued as an amateur club. In 1997, SVV merged with SMC to form SVVSMC. It reverted to its historical name in 2012.

== Former players ==
=== National team players ===
The following players were called up to represent their national teams in international football and received caps during their tenure with SVV:

- (Netherlands) Peet Geel (1952–1955)
- (Netherlands) Joop Hiele (1990–1992)
- (Netherlands) Jan Poulus (1933–1940)
- (Netherlands) Jan van Schijndel (1945–1960)
- (Netherlands) Jan Schrumpf (1946–1958)
- (Netherlands) Frans Steenbergen (1940–1953)

- Years in brackets indicate careerspan with SVV.

== Honours ==
- Eredivisie
  - Champions: 1948–49
- Eerste Divisie
  - Winners: 1968–69, 1989–90
- Dutch Supercup
  - Winners: 1949

== Former managers ==
- S. Bergkotte (1949–19xx)
- Arie de Vroet (1957–1959)
- Hans Croon (1959–1964)
- Rinus Gosens (1964–1970)
- Jan Bens (1970–1972)
- Rinus Gosens (1972–1973)
- Bob Maaskant (1973–197x)
- Leo Halkes (1975–19xx)
- Pim Visser (1977–1980)
- Sándor Popovics (1980–1981)
- Bert Jacobs (1981–1982)
- Nol de Ruiter (1982–1983)
- Huib Ruygrok (1983–1984)
- Dick Buitelaar
- Dick Advocaat (1989–1990)
