= 1995 Dutch Supercup =

Ajax	Feyenoord
2	1
- Date: 16 August 1995
- Venue: De Kuip, Rotterdam
- Referee: Mario van der Ende
- Attendance: 25,000

The sixth edition of the Dutch Supercup was held on 16 August 1995 at De Kuip in Rotterdam. The match featured the winners of the 1994–95 Eredivisie, Ajax, and the winners of the 1994–95 KNVB Cup, Feyenoord. This was the third year in a row that the Dutch Supercup involved these two teams. The games was won by Ajax 2–1 after extra time, with the Ajax goals coming from Ronald de Boer and Patrick Kluivert, and Henrik Larsson scoring for Feyenoord. This victory meant Ajax had won the Supercup three years in a row.

This was the last Supercup game to be played under the title Dutch Supercup (Dutch: Nederlandse Supercup), with subsequent cups being known under the title Johan Cruyff Shield (Dutch: Johan Cruijff Schaal).

== Match details ==
16 August 1995

Ajax	2–1 (a.e.t.)	Feyenoord
R. de Boer 25'; Kluivert 102'		Larsson 27'

De Kuip, Rotterdam
Attendance: 25,000
Referee: Mario van der Ende

Ajax	Feyenoord

Ajax
GK	1	(Netherlands) Edwin van der Sar
DF	2	(Netherlands) Michael Reiziger
DF	5	(Netherlands) Arnold Scholten	Booked	(substituted off) 91'
DF	3	(Netherlands) Frank de Boer
DF	4	(Netherlands) Winston Bogarde
MF	11	(Netherlands) Marc Overmars
MF	6	(Netherlands) Ronald de Boer	Booked
MF	8	(Netherlands) Edgar Davids (c)	Booked
MF	7	(Nigeria) Finidi George
FW	9	(Netherlands) Patrick Kluivert
FW	10	(Nigeria) Nwankwo Kanu		(substituted off) 91'
Substitutes:
MF	15	(Netherlands) Martijn Reuser		(substituted on) 91'
FW	14	(Netherlands) Nordin Wooter		(substituted on) 91'
Manager:
		(Netherlands) Louis van Gaal

Feyenoord
GK	1	(Netherlands) Ed de Goey
DF	2	(Netherlands) Clemens Zwijnenberg
DF	3	(Netherlands) Ulrich van Gobbel
DF	4	(Netherlands) Ronald Koeman (c)
DF	5	(Netherlands) Rob Maas
MF	10	(Netherlands) Rob Witschge	Booked
MF	6	(Netherlands) Peter Bosz	Booked
MF	9	(Netherlands) Orlando Trustfull	Booked
MF	11	(Netherlands) Regi Blinker		(substituted off) 91'
FW	7	(Sweden) Henrik Larsson
FW	8	(Netherlands) Giovanni van Bronckhorst		(substituted off) 88'
Substitutes:
MF	14	(Australia) Aurelio Vidmar		(substituted on) 88'
DF	13	(Netherlands) Ruud Heus	Booked	(substituted on) 91'
Manager:
		(Netherlands) Willem van Hanegem

Match rules

- 90 minutes.
- 30 minutes of extra time if necessary.
- Penalty shoot-out if scores still level.
- Five named substitutes
- Maximum of 3 substitutions.
