= Jan Poulus =

Dutch footballer (1916–1991)

Personal information
- Date of birth: 29 January 1916
- Date of death: 30 November 1991 (aged 75)
- Position: Midfielder

Senior career*
Years	Team	Apps	(Gls)
- SV SVV

International career
1940	Netherlands	1	(0)

Managerial career
- 1940: De Graafschap
- * Club domestic league appearances and goals

Jan Poulus (29 January 1916 – 30 November 1991) was a Dutch footballer who played as a midfielder. He made one appearance for the Netherlands national team in 1940.
