= Dennis Rommedahl =

Danish footballer (born 1978)

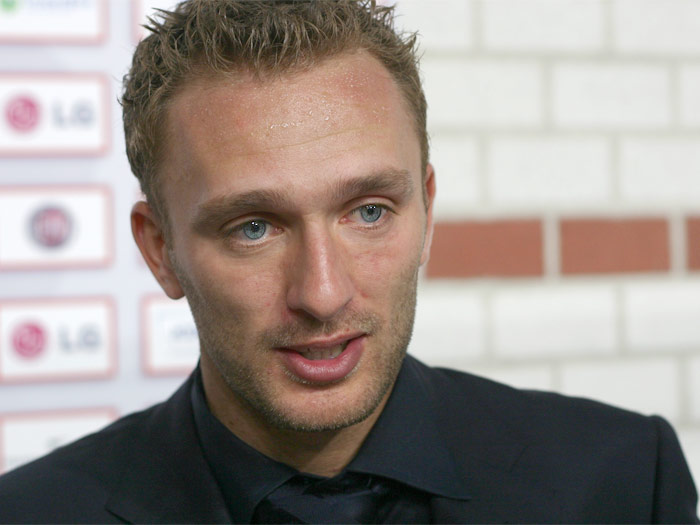
- Rommedahl in 2007

Personal information
- Full name: Dennis Rommedahl
- Date of birth: 22 July 1978 (age 48)
- Place of birth: Copenhagen, Denmark
- Height: 1.78 m (5 ft 10 in)
- Position: Right winger

Senior career*
Years	Team	Apps	(Gls)
1995–1997	Lyngby	26	(4)
1997–2004	PSV	160	(29)
1997–1998	→ RKC Waalwijk (loan)	34	(5)
2004–2007	Charlton Athletic	75	(4)
2007–2010	Ajax	61	(9)
2008–2009	→ NEC (loan)	14	(0)
2010–2011	Olympiacos	18	(1)
2011–2013	Brøndby	48	(6)
2013–2014	RKC Waalwijk	0	(0)
Total		436	(58)

International career
1996–1997	Denmark U19	4	(1)
1996–1999	Denmark U21	15	(4)
2000–2013	Denmark	126	(21)
- * Club domestic league appearances and goals

Dennis Rommedahl (Danish pronunciation: [ˈʁʌməˌtɛˀl]; born 22 July 1978) is a Danish former professional footballer who played as a right winger. During his 19-year professional career, he won four Eredivisie titles with PSV Eindhoven, and also played for several other Dutch clubs in between stints in England and Greece.

The fourth-most capped national player for Denmark, he appeared in 126 matches and scored 21 goals for his country, and was a member of the Danish squads at the 2002 World Cup, Euro 2004, the 2010 World Cup and Euro 2012. He was nominated for Danish Footballer of the Year in 2007, but did not win the award until 2010.

== Club career ==
Rommedahl was born in the Bispebjerg borough of Copenhagen. He played youth football for a number of clubs, including B. 93 and Lyngby. He made his senior debut in 1995 for Lyngby, playing in the Danish Superliga.

=== PSV Eindhoven and RKC Waalwijk ===
In 1997, he was acquired by PSV Eindhoven, where he made his debut on 22 March in a 1–0 home loss against Heerenveen. After his second match, PSV loaned him to RKC Waalwijk for the 1997–98 season. He returned to PSV in 1998 where he became a success by outrunning defenders and providing dangerous crosses from the wing. He was a member of the PSV squad that won four Eredivisie championships and four Johan Cruijff Shields.

=== Charlton Athletic ===
Rommedahl moved from Dutch to English football in the summer 2004 when he signed a four-year contract for Premier League side Charlton Athletic. His first season was spent settling in at The Valley, with a notable length of time spent on the substitute's bench and on the physiotherapist's table. During his second season, he took a leading role in helping Charlton climb the ladder in the Premier League.

Rommedahl was linked with several moves away from Charlton. In the summer of 2006, he was nearly sold to Zenit St. Petersburg. In December 2006, he was linked with a £1 million move to F.C. Copenhagen. This link was resurrected as Charlton edged closer to relegation, with Rommedahl being discussed as a replacement for Michael Silberbauer, who was expected to leave Denmark to join a foreign club. In the summer of 2007, Galatasaray and Getafe expressed interest in signing him. However, he finally left Charlton on 20 July 2007, moving to Ajax for fee of £680,000.

=== Ajax and NEC ===
With Ajax, Rommedahl immediately won his fifth career Johan Cruijff Shield in a 1–0 win over his former team, PSV Eindhoven. He was also one of five players nominated for the Danish Football Player of the Year in 2007. For the second half of the 2008–09 season, he went out on loan to NEC. He finished his Ajax-career at the end of the season 2009–10.

=== Olympiacos ===
In July 2010, Rommedahl signed a two-year contract with Super League Greece club Olympiacos. On 30 August 2011, Olympiacos released Rommedahl to find another club.

=== Brøndby ===
Rommedahl joined Brøndby on 30 August 2011 on a free transfer, signing a two-year contract and was given the number 11 shirt.

=== RKC Waalwijk ===
Rommedahl signed with RKC Waalwijk in the summer of 2013. Because of injuries he had never played an official match before he dissolved his contract with the club in January 2015.

== International career ==
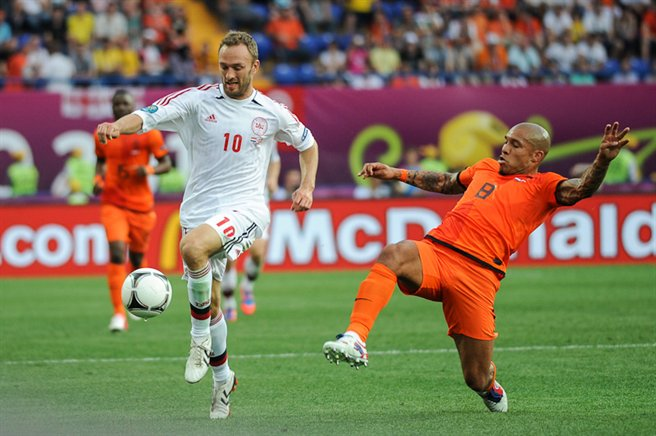
Rommedahl playing against the Netherlands at the Euro 2012 tournament.

Rommedahl was selected to play for the Danish under-19 national youth team in July 1996. He went on to play a combined 19 matches and score five goals for the under-19 and under-21 national youth teams.

After the appointment of Morten Olsen, Rommedahl was immediately called up for his Denmark senior national team debut in August 2000. He played the next 38 Danish national team matches in a row, the first 32 games in the starting line-up. The 38 games included Denmark's four games at the 2002 FIFA World Cup, where he scored against defending world champions France in Denmark's 2–0 victory. He also played all four Danish matches at the Euro 2004. His unbroken run of national team games ended in February 2004 when he missed the friendly against Turkey.

On 28 May 2010, Olsen announced that Rommedhal would be part of the final squad of 23 participating in the 2010 World Cup. He assisted Nicklas Bendtner's goal, and scored the winner himself, in a group stage game against Cameroon on 19 June 2010. Rommedahl was also inducted in the final squad for Euro 2012, where he once again participated in all of the Danish group matches.

On 9 October 2014, after a long-term injury, Rommedahl announced that he would officially retire from the national team. He was given a farewell ceremony before Denmark's match against Portugal on 14 October 2014.

== Career statistics ==
=== Club ===
Appearances and goals by club, season and competition
Club	Season	League			National Cup		League Cup		Continental		Other		Total	
Club	Season	Division	Apps	Goals	Apps	Goals	Apps	Goals	Apps	Goals	Apps	Goals	Apps	Goals
Lyngby	1995–96	Danish Superliga	9	0			–				–		9	0
Lyngby	1996–97	Danish Superliga	17	4			–		4	0	–		21	4
Lyngby	Total		26	4	0	0	0	0	4	0	0	0	30	4
PSV Eindhoven	1996–97	Eredivisie	2	0			–		0	0	–		2	0
PSV Eindhoven	1998–99	Eredivisie	19	2			–		7	2	–		26	4
PSV Eindhoven	1999–2000	Eredivisie	23	0			–		6	0	–		29	0
PSV Eindhoven	2000–01	Eredivisie	30	5	1	0	–		9	2	1 (Note: Appearance in 2000 Johan Cruyff Shield)	0	41	7
PSV Eindhoven	2001–02	Eredivisie	34	12			–		12	0	1 (Note: Appearance in 2001 Johan Cruyff Shield)	1	47	13
PSV Eindhoven	2002–03	Eredivisie	33	6			–		6	1	1 (Note: Appearance in 2002 Johan Cruyff Shield)	0	40	7
PSV Eindhoven	2003–04	Eredivisie	19	4			–		6	0	1 (Note: Appearance in 2003 Johan Cruyff Shield)	0	26	4
PSV Eindhoven	Total		160	29	1	0	0	0	46	5	4	1	211	35
RKC Waalwijk (loan)	1997–98	Eredivisie	34	5			–		–		–		34	5
Charlton Athletic	2004–05	Premier League	26	2	1	0	0	0	–		–		27	2
Charlton Athletic	2005–06	Premier League	21	2	3	2	1	0	–		–		25	4
Charlton Athletic	2006–07	Premier League	28	0	1	0	3	0	–		–		32	0
Charlton Athletic	Total		75	4	5	2	4	0	0	0	0	0	84	6
Ajax	2007–08	Eredivisie	30	3	3	1	–		4	1	5 (Note: One appearance in 2007 Johan Cruyff Shield; four appearances, one goal in Eredivisie play-offs for the Champions League)	1	42	6
Ajax	2008–09	Eredivisie	3	0	0	0	–		0	0	–		3	0
Ajax	2009–10	Eredivisie	28	6	6	1	–		7	2	–		41	9
Ajax	Total		61	9	9	2	0	0	11	3	5	1	86	15
NEC (loan)	2008–09	Eredivisie	14	0	2	0	–		–		–		16	0
Olympiacos	2010–11	Super League Greece	18	1	3	0	–		2	1	–		23	2
Brøndby IF	2011–12	Danish Superliga	20	3	1	0	–		0	0	–		21	3
Brøndby IF	2012–13	Danish Superliga	28	3	3	1	–		0	0	–		31	4
Brøndby IF	Total		48	6	4	1	0	0	0	0	0	0	52	7
RKC Waalwijk	2013–14	Eredivisie	0	0	0	0	–		–		–		0	0
RKC Waalwijk	2014–15	Eerste Divisie	0	0	0	0	–		–		–		0	0
RKC Waalwijk	Total		0	0	0	0	0	0	0	0	0	0	0	0
Career total			436	58	24	5	4	0	63	9	9	2	536	74

=== International ===
Scores and results list Denmark's goal tally first, score column indicates score after each Rommedahl goal.

List of international goals scored by Dennis Rommedahl
No.	Date	Venue	Opponent	Score	Result	Competition
1	7 October 2000	Windsor Park, Belfast, Northern Ireland	Northern Ireland	1–1	1–1	2002 FIFA World Cup qualification
2	15 November 2000	Parken Stadium, Copenhagen, Denmark	Germany	1–0	2–1	Friendly
3	15 November 2000	Parken Stadium, Copenhagen, Denmark	Germany	2–0	2–1	Friendly
4	1 September 2001	Parken Stadium, Copenhagen, Denmark	Northern Ireland	1–0	1–1	2002 FIFA World Cup qualification
5	6 October 2001	Parken Stadium, Copenhagen, Denmark	Iceland	1–0	6–0	2002 FIFA World Cup qualification
6	17 April 2002	Parken Stadium, Copenhagen, Denmark	Israel	3–0	3–1	Friendly
7	11 June 2002	Incheon World Cup Stadium, Incheon, South Korea	France	1–0	2–0	2002 FIFA World Cup
8	29 March 2003	Stadionul, Bucharest, Romania	Romania	1–1	5–2	UEFA Euro 2004 qualification
9	29 March 2003	Stadionul, Bucharest, Romania	Romania	5–2	5–2	UEFA Euro 2004 qualification
10	9 February 2005	Karaiskakis Stadium, Athens, Greece	Greece	1–2	1–2	2006 FIFA World Cup qualification
11	17 August 2005	Parken Stadium, Copenhagen, Denmark	England	1–0	4–1	Friendly
12	16 August 2006	Fionia Park, Odense, Denmark	Poland	2–0	2–0	Friendly
13	6 September 2006	Laugardalsvöllur, Reykjavík, Iceland	Iceland	1–0	2–0	UEFA Euro 2008 qualification
14	6 June 2007	Skonto Stadium, Riga, Latvia	Latvia	1–0	2–0	UEFA Euro 2008 qualification
15	6 June 2007	Skonto Stadium, Riga, Latvia	Latvia	2–0	2–0	UEFA Euro 2008 qualification
16	17 October 2007	Parken Stadium, Copenhagen, Denmark	Latvia	3–1	3–1	UEFA Euro 2008 qualification
17	19 June 2010	Loftus Versfeld Stadium, Pretoria, South Africa	Cameroon	2–1	2–1	2010 FIFA World Cup
18	11 August 2010	Parken Stadium, Copenhagen, Denmark	Germany	1–2	2–2	Friendly
19	26 March 2011	Ullevaal Stadion, Oslo, Norway	Norway	1–0	1–1	UEFA Euro 2012 qualification
20	7 October 2011	GSP Stadium, Nicosia, Cyprus	Cyprus	2–0	4–1	UEFA Euro 2012 qualification
21	7 October 2011	GSP Stadium, Nicosia, Cyprus	Cyprus	3–0	4–1	UEFA Euro 2012 qualification

== Honours ==
PSV

- Eredivisie: 1996–97, 1999–2000, 2000–01, 2002–03
- Johan Cruijff Shield: 2000, 2001, 2003

Ajax

- KNVB Cup: 2009–10
- Johan Cruijff Shield: 2007

Olympiacos

- Super League Greece: 2010–11

Individual

- Danish Football Association's award (2): 2007, 2010
- UEFA awards 100 caps: 2011

== See also ==
- List of men's footballers with 100 or more international caps
