= Jan van Schijndel =

Dutch association football player

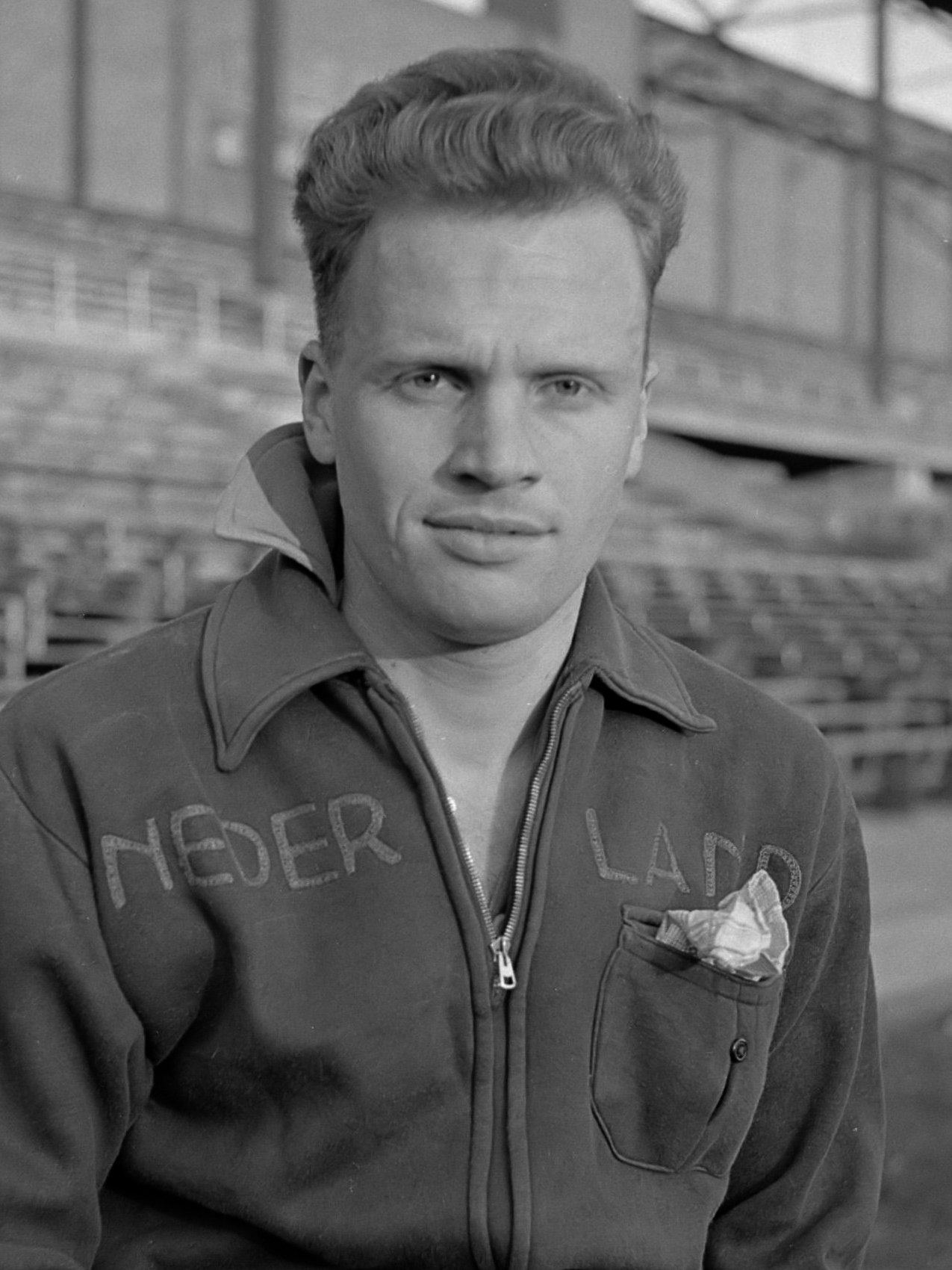
- van Schijndel in 1951

Personal information
- Full name: Jan van Schijndel
- Date of birth: 4 March 1927
- Place of birth: Schiedam, Netherlands
- Date of death: 28 February 2011 (aged 83)
- Position: Midfielder

Youth career
- 1939–1945: SVV

Senior career*
| Years | Team | Apps | (Gls) |
| 1945–1960 | SVV | | |

International career^{‡}
| 1949–1955 | Netherlands | 17 | (1) |
- * Club domestic league appearances and goals as of 4 March 2011 ‡ National team caps and goals as of 4 March 2011

Jan van Schijndel (4 March 1927 – 28 February 2011) was a Dutch football player.

== Club career ==
A one-club man, van Schijndel has played his entire career for SVV in Schiedam, with whom he won the 1949 Dutch league title and the first Dutch Supercup. He was one of the last surviving players of that title-winning squad.

== International career ==
Van Schijndel made his debut for the Netherlands in a March 1949 friendly match against Belgium and had earned a total of 17 caps, scoring one goal. He captained the Netherlands in his last three games. He was a non-playing squad member for his country at the 1952 Summer Olympics.

His final international was an April 1955 friendly match, also against Belgium.

=== International goals ===
Scores and results list the Netherlands' goal tally first.

| # | Date | Venue | Opponent | Score | Result | Competition |
|---|---|---|---|---|---|---|
| 1 | 16 June 1949 | Olympic Stadium, Helsinki, Finland | Finland | 4-0 | 4-1 | Friendly match |

== Death ==
Van Schijndel died on 28 February 2011 at the age of 83.
