= Weerselo =

- Village
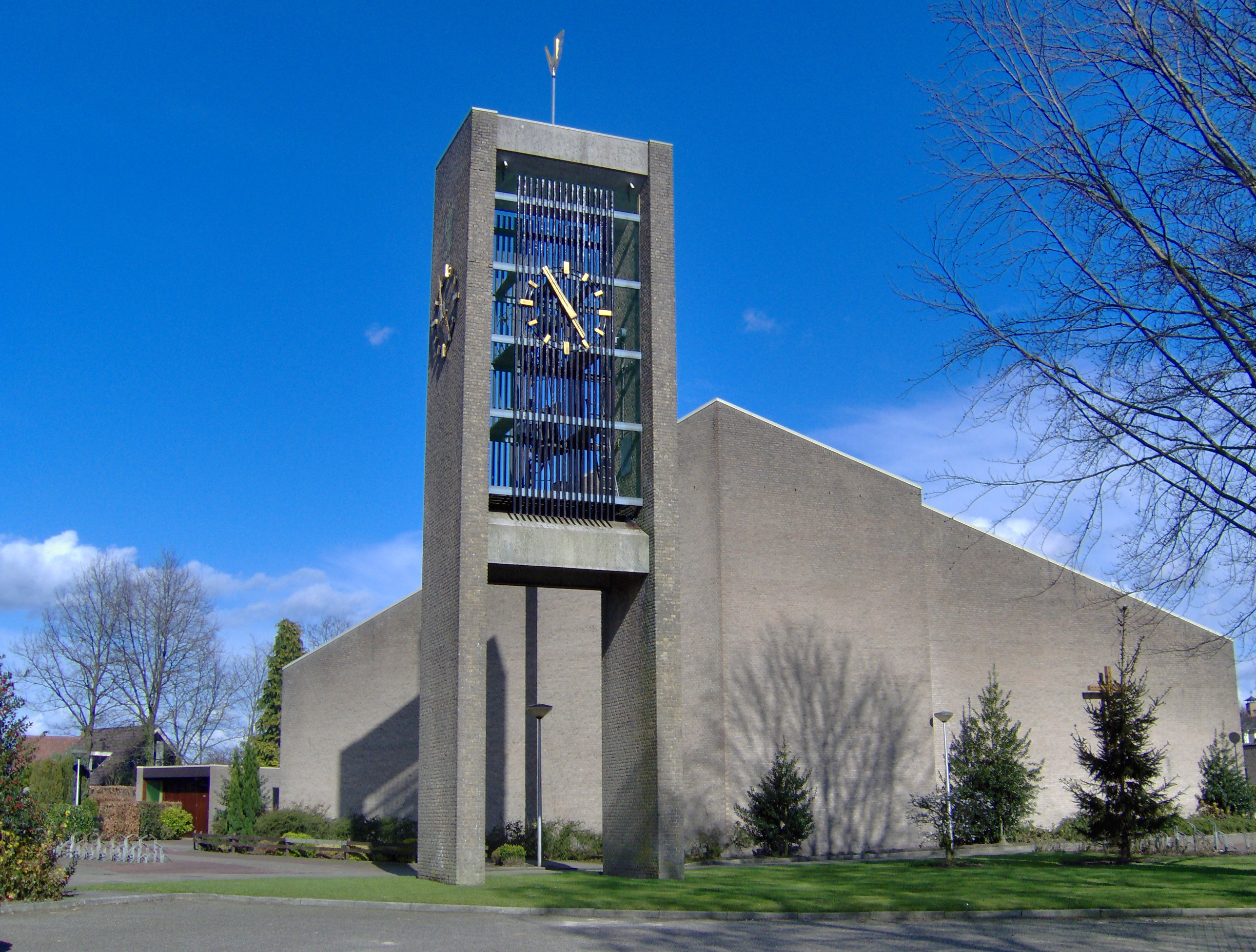
- Church of Saint Remigius

- Flag Coat of arms
- Nickname: Weerseloërs
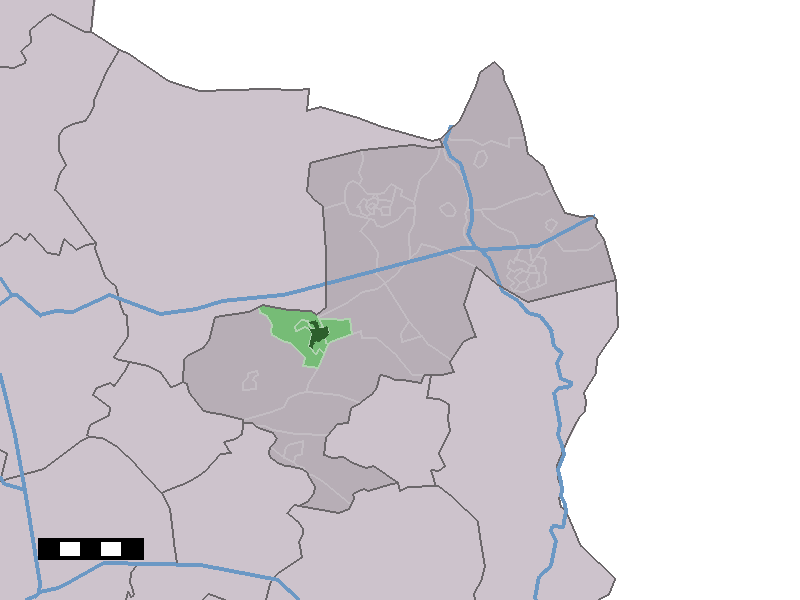
- The village centre (dark green) and the statistical district (light green) of Weerselo in the municipality of Dinkelland.

- Location in the Netherlands Weerselo (Netherlands)
- Coordinates: 52°21′3″N 6°51′24″E
- Country: Netherlands
- Province: Overijssel
- Municipality: Dinkelland

Area
  - Total: 18.60 km^{2} (7.18 sq mi)
- Elevation: 17 m (56 ft)

Population (2021)
  - Total: 3,055
  - Density: 164.2/km^{2} (425.4/sq mi)
- Demonym: Weerseloërs
- Time zone: UTC+1 (CET)
  - Summer (DST): UTC+2 (CEST)
- Postal code: 7595
- Dialing code: 0541

Weerselo is a village in the Dutch province of Overijssel. It is a part of the municipality of Dinkelland, and lies about 6 km northwest of Oldenzaal. Weerselo was a separate municipality until 2001 when it became a part of Dinkelland.

== Overview ==
It was first mentioned in the 1160s as Werslo. The etymology is unclear. It consists of two settlements. Het Stift developed around a 12th century Benedictine monastery, and the village of Weerselo which was also called Nijstad. The monastery burnt down in 1523. In 1840, it was home to 558 people.

A fine example of the historic building style in Twente, in the east of the Netherlands, can be found near the Stiftskerk, which in itself is a point of interest in this village, since it is its oldest core that gave name to the village.

The 'Weerselose Markt' is a flea market for antiques and bric-à-brac which opens every Saturday.

== Notable people ==
- Felix von Heijden (1890–1982), football player who competed in the 1920 Summer Olympics
- Jos Lansink (born 1961), equestrian
- Elles Leferink (born 1976), volleyball player who competed in the 1996 Summer Olympics
- André Paus (born 1965), football player and manager

== Gallery ==
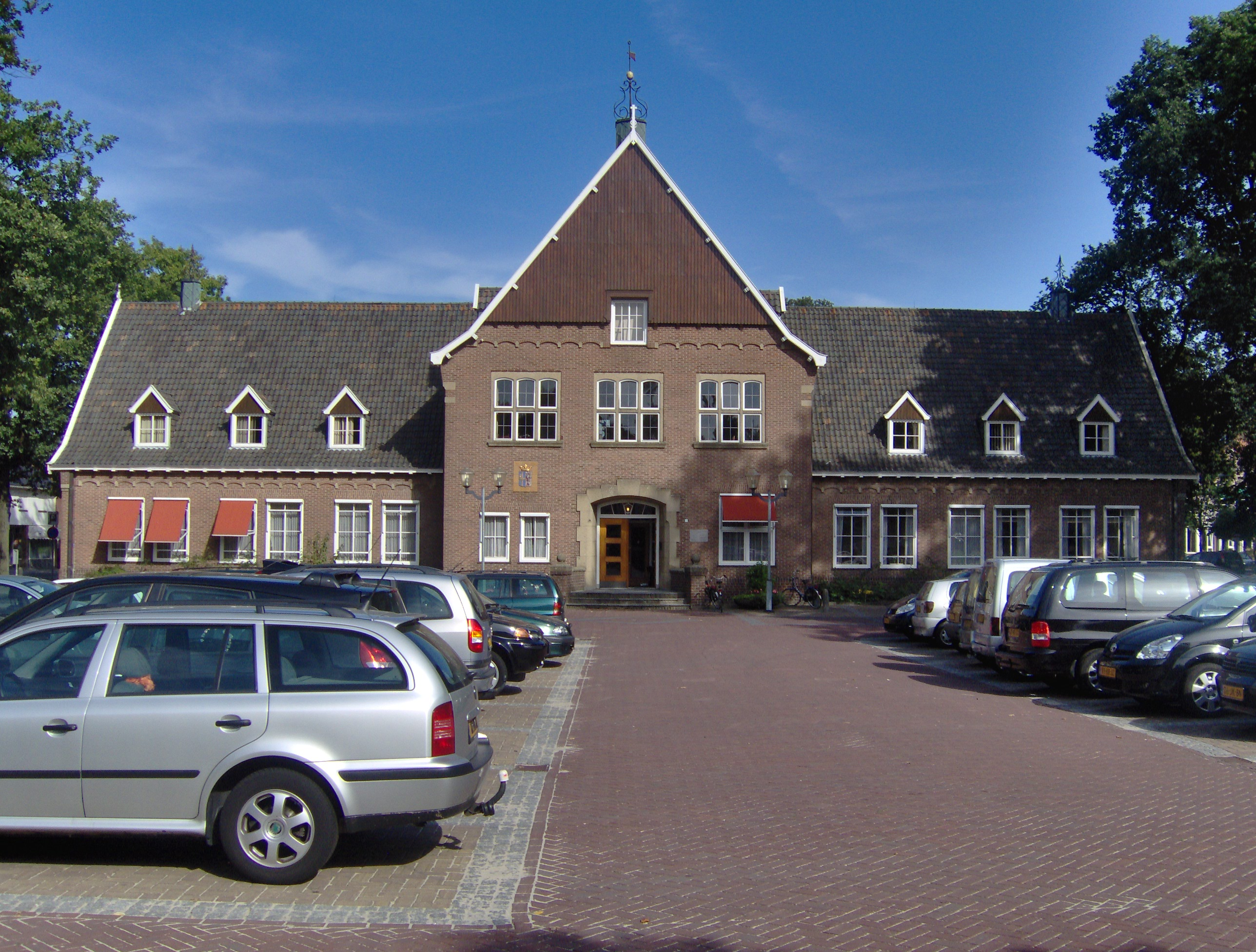
Former town hall of Weerselo

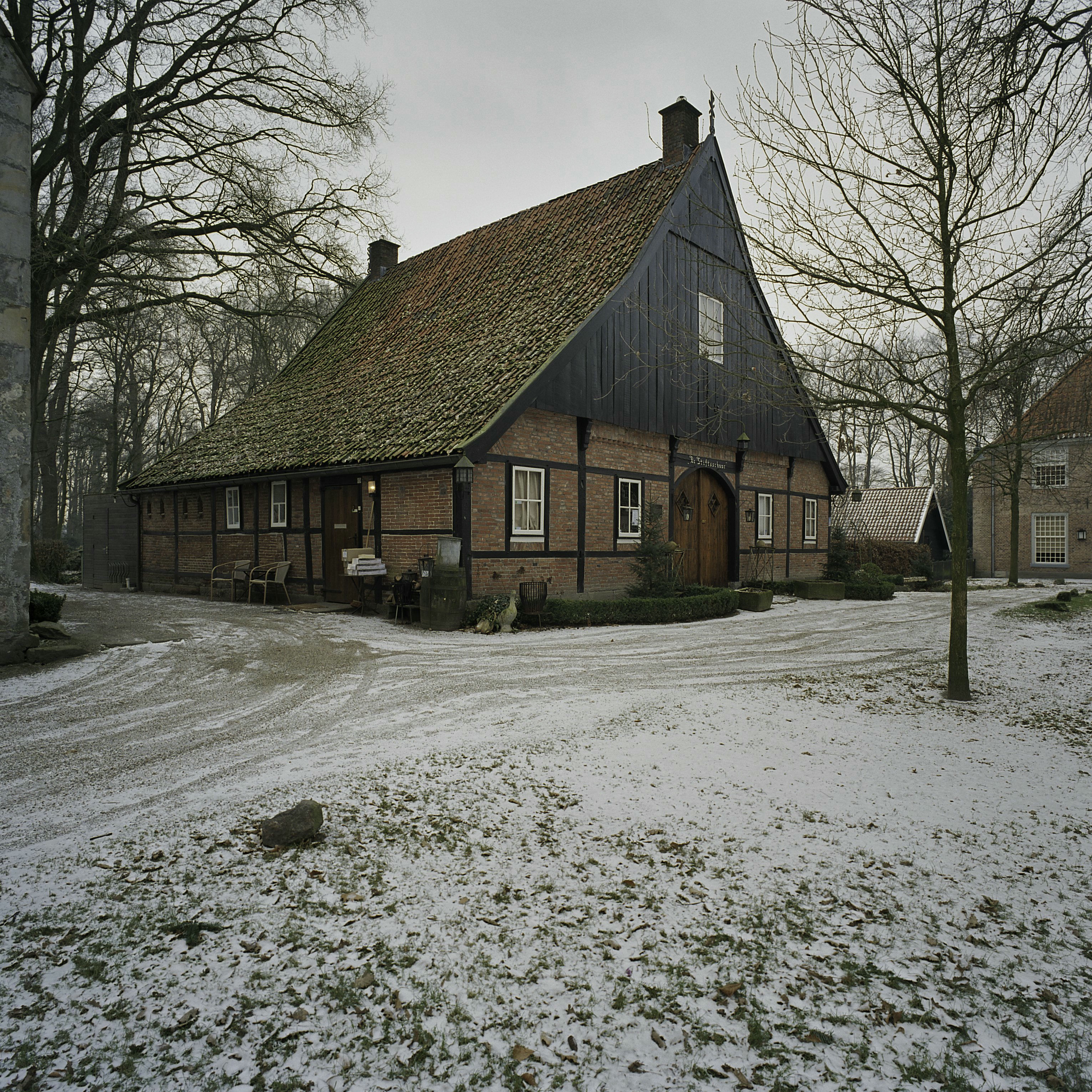
Stiftschuur

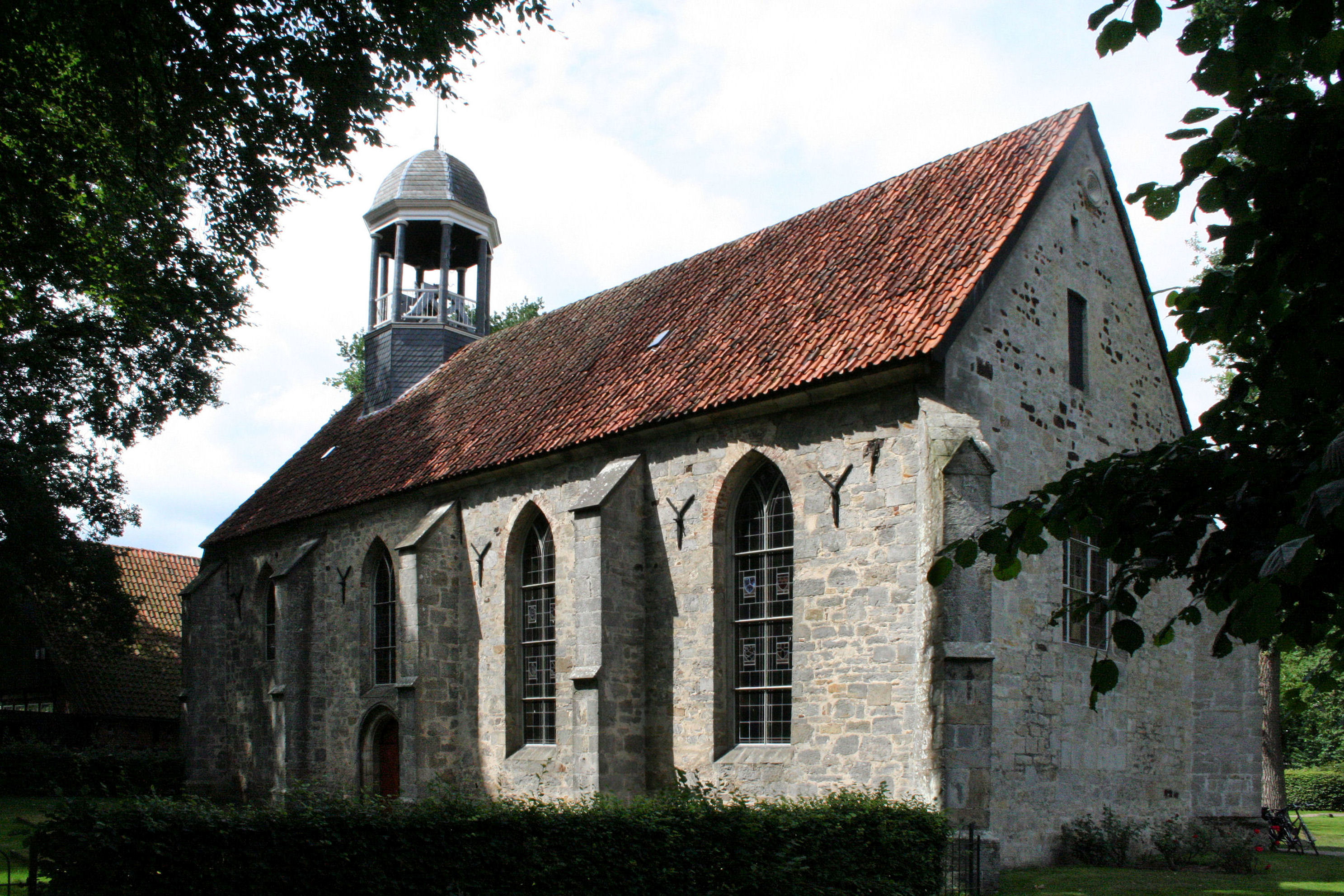
Stiftkerk
