= 1948–49 Netherlands Football League Championship =

Netherl. Football Championship
- Season: 1948–1949
- Champions: SVV (1st title)

The Netherlands Football League Championship 1948–1949 was contested by 66 teams participating in six divisions. The national champion would be determined by a play-off featuring the winners of the eastern, northern, two southern and two western football divisions of the Netherlands. SVV won this year's championship by beating BVV Den Bosch, AGOVV Apeldoorn, sc Heerenveen, VSV and NOAD.

== New entrants ==
Eerste Klasse East:

- Promoted from 2nd Division: HVV Hengelo

Eerste Klasse North:

- Promoted from 2nd Division: LVV Friesland

Eerste Klasse South-I:

- Moving in from South-II: Brabantia, Limburgia, MVV Maastricht, NAC and VVV Venlo

Eerste Klasse South-II:

- Moving in from South-I: Baronie/DNL, FC Eindhoven, LONGA, Maurits and Sittardse Boys
- Promoted from 2nd Division: SV Kerkrade

Eerste Klasse West-I:

- Moving in from West-II: ADO Den Haag, Blauw-Wit Amsterdam, DOS, Sparta Rotterdam and Stormvogels
- Promoted from 2nd Division: SVV

Eerste Klasse West-II:

- Moving in from West-I: HBS Craeyenhout, Hermes DVS, SC Neptunus VSV and Zeeburgia
- Promoted from 2nd Division: KFC

== Divisions ==
=== Eerste Klasse East ===
Pos	Team	Pld	W	D	L	GF	GA	GD	Pts	Qualification or relegation
1	AGOVV Apeldoorn	20	11	4	5	40	30	+10	26	Qualified for Championship play-off
2	SC Enschede	20	9	7	4	35	24	+11	25	
3	Heracles	20	9	5	6	29	23	+6	23	
4	HVV Hengelo	20	6	8	6	34	31	+3	20	
5	Enschedese Boys	20	8	4	8	27	26	+1	20	
6	Quick Nijmegen	20	7	6	7	35	38	−3	20	
7	FC Wageningen	20	6	7	7	34	35	−1	19	
8	Zwolsche Boys	20	6	6	8	26	26	0	18	
9	Go Ahead	20	6	6	8	27	30	−3	18	
10	Be Quick Zutphen	20	7	3	10	27	39	−12	17	Relegated to 2nd Division
11	NEC Nijmegen	20	5	4	11	26	38	−12	14	

Source: rsssf.com

=== Eerste Klasse North ===
Pos	Team	Pld	W	D	L	GF	GA	GD	Pts	Qualification or relegation
1	sc Heerenveen	18	15	3	0	68	19	+49	33	Qualified for Championship play-off
2	Be Quick 1887	19	8	7	4	39	22	+17	23	
3	LVV Friesland	19	8	6	5	31	34	−3	22	
4	LAC Frisia 1883	20	10	2	8	41	35	+6	22	
5	Sneek Wit Zwart	20	9	3	8	36	36	0	21	
6	VV Leeuwarden	20	8	4	8	43	39	+4	20	
7	Velocitas 1897	20	9	2	9	28	41	−13	20	
8	GVAV Rapiditas	20	5	5	10	34	39	−5	15	
9	HSC	20	4	6	10	23	37	−14	14	
10	FC Emmen	20	5	4	11	30	53	−23	14	Relegated to 2nd Division
11	Achilles 1894	20	4	4	12	32	50	−18	12	

Source: rsssf.com

=== Eerste Klasse South-I ===
Pos	Team	Pld	W	D	L	GF	GA	GD	Pts	Qualification or relegation
1	BVV Den Bosch	20	15	1	4	44	13	+31	31	Qualified for Championship play-off and transferred to South-II
2	Limburgia	20	13	3	4	49	34	+15	29	
3	Willem II	20	11	3	6	42	25	+17	25	Transferred to South-II
4	VVV	20	11	2	7	33	16	+17	24	
5	NAC	20	10	3	7	39	32	+7	23	Transferred to South-II
6	MVV Maastricht	20	7	5	8	40	34	+6	19	
7	VV TSC	20	5	8	7	36	37	−1	18	Transferred to South-II
8	Brabantia	20	7	3	10	24	38	−14	17	
9	Juliana	20	6	4	10	43	62	−19	16	Transferred to South-II
10	HVV Helmond	20	3	5	12	29	50	−21	11	Relegated to 2nd Division
11	De Spechten	20	2	3	15	27	65	−38	7	Relegated to 2nd Division

Source: rsssf.com

=== Eerste Klasse South-II ===
Pos	Team	Pld	W	D	L	GF	GA	GD	Pts	Qualification or relegation
1	NOAD	20	12	4	4	36	21	+15	28	Qualified for Championship play-off and transferred to South-I
2	Bleijerheide	20	9	6	5	32	23	+9	24	
3	PSV Eindhoven	20	8	5	7	35	26	+9	21	Transferred to South-I
4	FC Eindhoven	20	8	5	7	36	30	+6	21	
5	SC Helmondia	20	8	5	7	29	30	−1	21	Transferred to South-I
6	SC Emma	20	7	5	8	22	28	−6	19	
7	SV Kerkrade	20	7	4	9	32	35	−3	18	Transferred to South-I
8	Maurits	20	6	6	8	21	25	−4	18	
9	Sittardse Boys	20	5	8	7	24	29	−5	18	Transferred to South-I
10	LONGA	20	7	2	11	29	34	−5	16	
11	Baronie/DNL	20	7	2	11	37	52	−15	16	Relegated to 2nd Division

Source: rsssf.com

=== Eerste Klasse West-I ===
Pos	Team	Pld	W	D	L	GF	GA	GD	Pts	Qualification or relegation
1	SVV	20	15	2	3	50	25	+25	32	Qualified for Championship play-off and transferred to West-II
2	Xerxes	20	12	3	5	52	33	+19	27	Transferred to West-II
3	Blauw-Wit Amsterdam	20	11	4	5	46	32	+14	26	
4	AFC Ajax	20	9	5	6	51	42	+9	23	Transferred to West-II
5	DOS	20	8	5	7	37	36	+1	21	
6	HFC Haarlem	20	8	2	10	42	41	+1	18	
7	ADO Den Haag	20	6	4	10	40	38	+2	16	
8	HVV 't Gooi	20	6	3	11	23	41	−18	15	Transferred to West-II
9	De Volewijckers	20	4	7	9	21	40	−19	15	Transferred to West-II
10	Stormvogels	20	6	2	12	30	44	−14	14	Relegated to 2nd Division
11	Sparta Rotterdam	20	5	3	12	22	42	−20	13	

Source: rsssf.com

=== Eerste Klasse West-II ===
Pos	Team	Pld	W	D	L	GF	GA	GD	Pts	Qualification or relegation
1	VSV	20	17	0	3	56	26	+30	34	Qualified for Championship play-off and transferred to West-I
2	Feijenoord	20	12	5	3	57	40	+17	29	Transferred to West-I
3	HFC EDO	20	9	7	4	40	24	+16	25	
4	Hermes DVS	20	9	6	5	47	31	+16	24	Transferred to West-I
5	DWS	20	8	5	7	29	25	+4	21	
6	SC Neptunus	20	6	6	8	26	34	−8	18	
7	HBS Craeyenhout	20	7	3	10	42	52	−10	17	
8	KFC	20	4	8	8	39	46	−7	16	Transferred to West-I
9	Zeeburgia	20	5	5	10	33	44	−11	15	Transferred to West-I
10	DFC	20	5	4	11	26	41	−15	14	Relegated to 2nd Division
11	DHC Delft	20	3	1	16	22	54	−32	7	Relegated to 2nd Division

Source: rsssf.com

=== Championship play-off ===
Pos	Team	Pld	W	D	L	GF	GA	GD	Pts	Result	SVV	BVV	AGO	HEE	VSV	NOA
1	SVV	10	6	3	1	20	13	+7	15	Champion		2–1	1–0	3–1	0–4	4–0
2	BVV Den Bosch	10	6	1	3	37	29	+8	13		2–2		0–0	2–3	3–0	0–0
3	AGOVV Apeldoorn	10	4	3	3	14	8	+6	11		0–0	1–2		3–1	3–1	3–0
4	sc Heerenveen	10	5	1	4	28	21	+7	11		4–4	1–2	1–3		3–1	7–2
5	VSV	10	4	0	6	16	18	−2	8		1–3	0–1	1–0	1–4		5–1
6	NOAD	10	0	2	8	5	28	−23	2		0–1	1–2	1–1	0–3	0–2	

Source: rsssf.com
