= Han Engelsman =

Dutch footballer

Personal information
- Full name: Henri Herman Engelsman
- Date of birth: 26 October 1919
- Place of birth: Amsterdam, Netherlands
- Date of death: 8 February 1990 (aged 70)
- Place of death: Nijmegen, Netherlands
- Position: Midfielder

Senior career*
Years	Team	Apps	(Gls)
1937–1949	Quick 1888		

International career
1948	Netherlands	1	(1)
- * Club domestic league appearances and goals

Han Engelsman (26 October 1919 – 8 February 1990) was a Dutch footballer. He played in one match for the Netherlands national football team in 1948.

Born in Amsterdam, Engelsman played for Quick 1888 from Nijmegen.

Engelsman took his own life when jumping from a bridge in 1990.
