= Clemens Zwijnenberg =

Dutch footballer (born 1970)

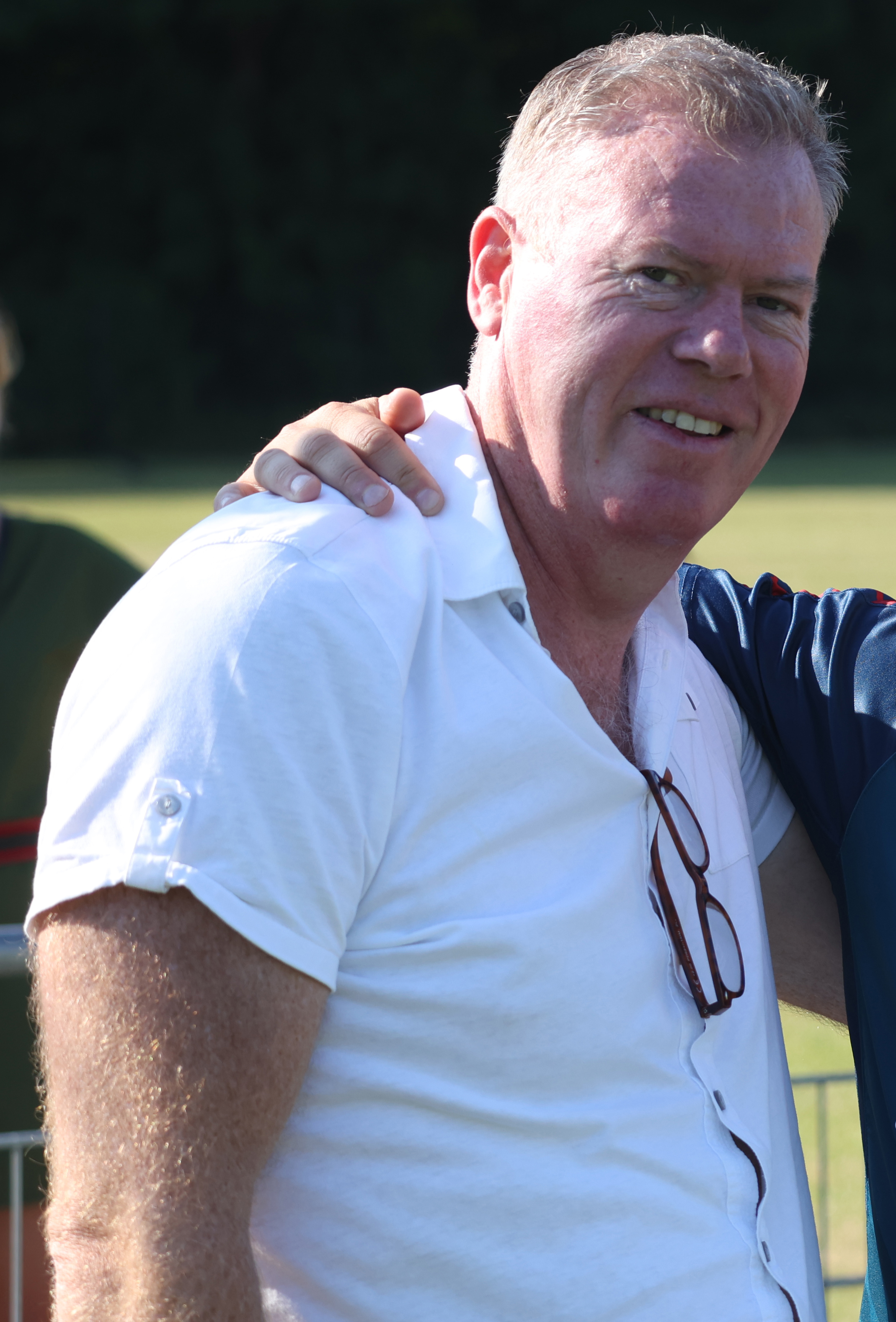

Personal information
- Date of birth: 18 May 1970 (age 56)
- Place of birth: Enschede, Netherlands
- Position: Defender

Senior career*
Years	Team	Apps	(Gls)
198x–1995	FC Twente	148	(13)
1995–1998	Feyenoord	34	(2)
1998	AaB	9	(1)
1998	→ Bristol City (loan)	3	(0)
1998–1999	NAC Breda	17	(0)
1999–2000	Austria Lustenau		
- * Club domestic league appearances and goals

Clemens Zwijenberg (born 18 May 1970) is a Dutch former professional footballer who played as a defender. He is best known for playing 148 games with FC Twente in the 1980s and 1990s.

== Career ==
Born in Enschede, Zwijnenberg started his senior career with Twente. In 1998, he signed for Aalborg Boldspilklub in the Danish Superliga, where he made nine league appearances and scored one goal. After that, he played for English club Bristol City, Dutch club NAC Breda, and Austrian club Austria Lustenau before retiring in 2001.
