= 1991 Dutch Supercup =

1991 PTT Telecom Cup
PSV Eindhoven	Feyenoord
0	1
- Date: 14 August 1991
- Venue: De Kuip, Rotterdam
- Referee: Jaap Uilenberg
- Attendance: 30,288

The 1991 Dutch Supercup (Dutch: Nederlandse Supercup), known as the PTT Telecom Cup for sponsorship reasons, was the second Supercup match in Dutch football. The game was played on 14 August 1991 at De Kuip in Rotterdam, between 1990–91 Eredivisie champions PSV Eindhoven and 1990–91 KNVB Cup winners Feyenoord. Feyenoord won the match 1–0.

== Match details ==
14 August 1991

PSV Eindhoven	0–1	Feyenoord
	Report	Damaschin 10'

De Kuip, Rotterdam
Attendance: 30,288
Referee: Jaap Uilenberg

PSV Eindhoven	Feyenoord

GK	1	(Netherlands) Hans van Breukelen
RB	2	(Netherlands) Berry van Aerle
CB	3	(Netherlands) Stan Valckx
CB	4	(Netherlands) Erwin Koeman (c)
LB	5	(Netherlands) Jerry de Jong	(yellow card) 68' (yellow-red card) 73'
RM	7	(Netherlands) Juul Ellerman
CM	6	(Czechoslovakia) Jozef Chovanec
CM	8	(Netherlands) Edward Linskens
LM	11	(Netherlands) Peter Hoekstra
CF	9	(Brazil) Romário		(substituted off) 18'
CF	10	(Netherlands) Wim Kieft		(substituted off) 71'
Substitutes:
FW	12	(Zambia) Kalusha Bwalya	(yellow card) 52'	(substituted in) 18'
MF	15	(Netherlands) Dick Schreuder		(substituted in) 71'
Manager:
(England) Bobby Robson

GK	1	(Netherlands) Ed de Goey
RB	7	(Netherlands) Ulrich van Gobbel
CB	2	(Netherlands) Henk Fraser	(yellow card) 49'
CB	3	(Netherlands) John de Wolf	(red card) 63'
LB	5	(Netherlands) Ruud Heus
CM	6	(Netherlands) Arnold Scholten
CM	4	(Netherlands) John Metgod (c)
CM	10	(Netherlands) Rob Witschge
RW	8	(Hungary) József Kiprich		(substituted off) 80'
CF	9	(Romania) Marian Damaschin
LW	11	(Netherlands) Regi Blinker		(substituted off) 65'
Substitutes:
DF	15	(Netherlands) Sjaak Troost		(substituted in) 65'
FW	12	(Netherlands) Gaston Taument		(substituted in) 80'
Manager:
(Netherlands) Hans Dorjee
