= Quick 1888 =

Dutch sports club

Quick 1888 (also referred to as Quick Nijmegen) is an amateur sporting club from Nijmegen, Netherlands. It was founded in 1888 as a cricket club and currently plays football in the Tweede Klasse, which is the fifth level of amateur football.

As a football club, Quick reached its moment of fame in 1949 when it won the Dutch Cup of which a replica is on display in the club house. Afterwards the club lost the final of the 1949 Dutch Supercup against Schiedamse Voetbal Vereniging. The club also has a badminton, athletics, cricket, ultimate frisbee and a field hockey branch.

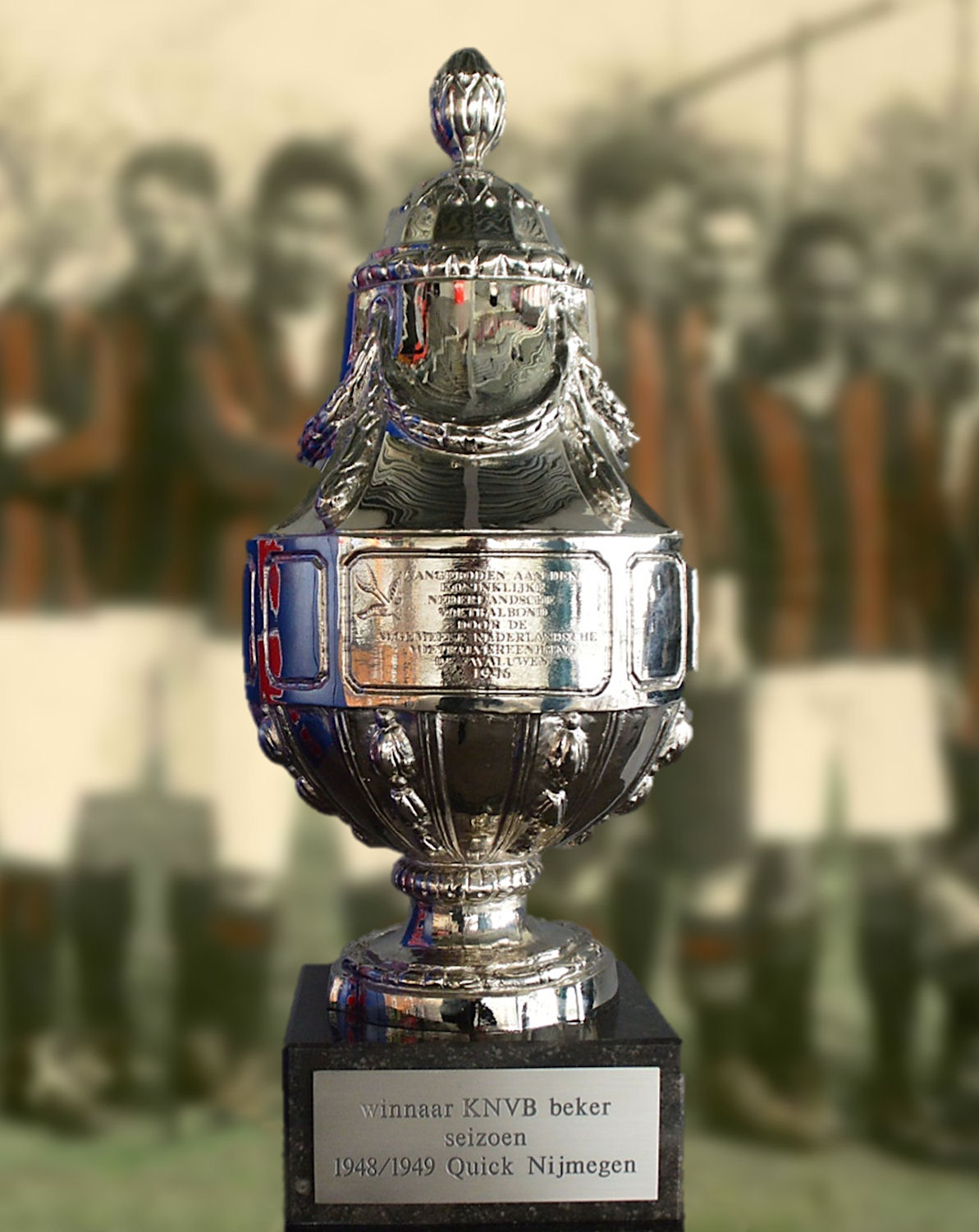
KNVB Cup 1949

== Honours ==
- KNVB Cup
  - Winners (1): 1948–49

== Dutch international football players ==
- Felix von Heijden 1
- Henk Steeman 1
- Piet Velthuizen 1

== Cricket ==
As a cricket club, Quick has produced a number of national representatives in both men's and women's cricket. Most recently, two members represented the Netherlands national women's cricket team at the 2008 Women's Cricket World Cup Qualifier. The club is affiliated with the Koninklijke Nederlandse Cricket Bond. It currently has three teams, two senior men's and a veterans team, making it one of the larger cricket clubs in the east of the Netherlands.

== Tennis ==
Quick has two tennis courts.
