= Frans Steenbergen =

Dutch footballer

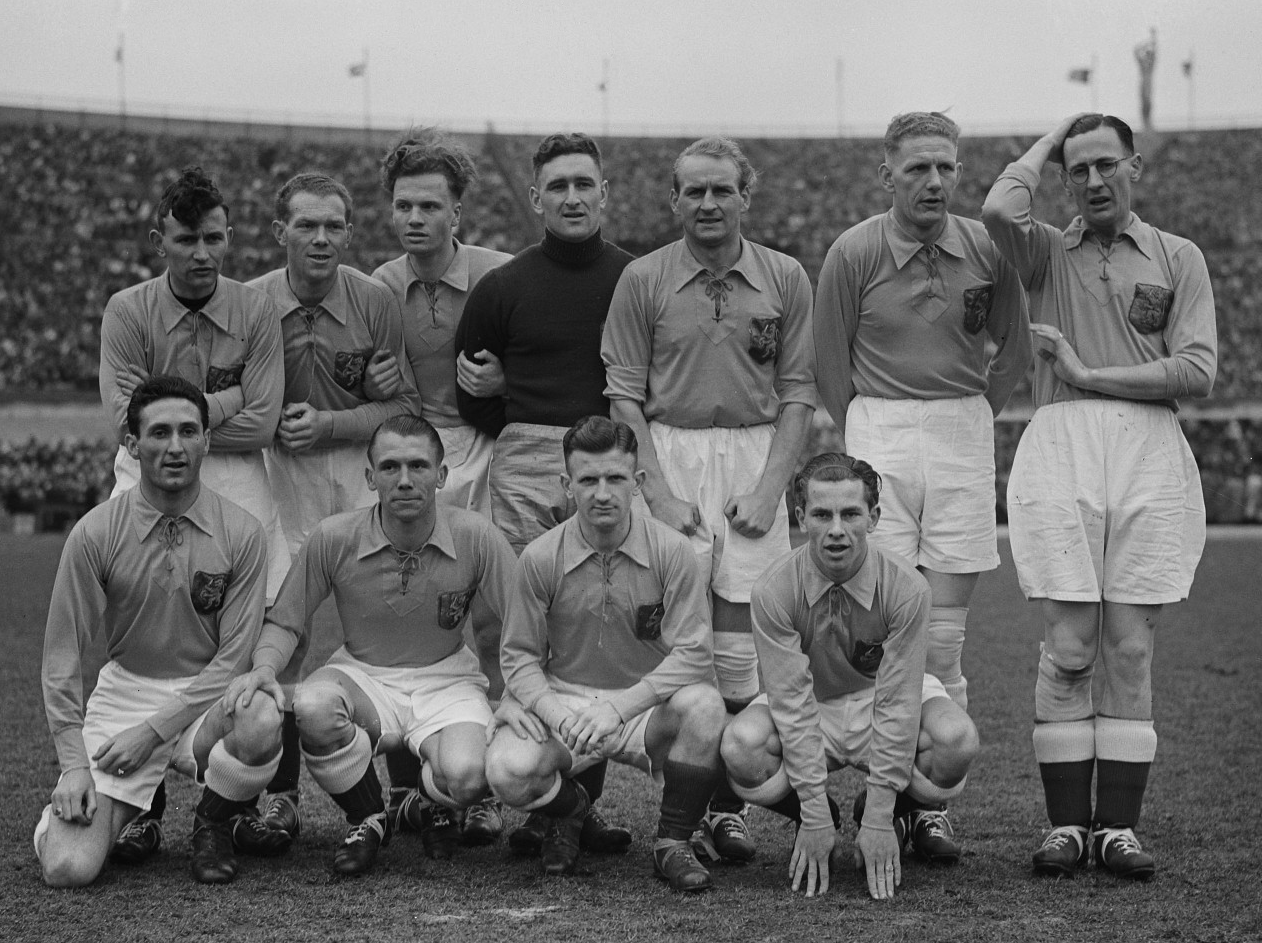
- Steenbergen (standing, 2nd left, in the Netherlands national football team (1949))

Personal information
- Date of birth: 17 August 1920
- Date of death: 6 July 1978 (aged 57)

International career
| Years | Team | Apps | (Gls) |
| 1949 | Netherlands | 2 | (0) |

Frans Steenbergen (17 August 1920 – 6 July 1978) was a Dutch footballer. He played in two matches for the Netherlands national football team in 1949.
