= Jan Schrumpf =

Dutch footballer

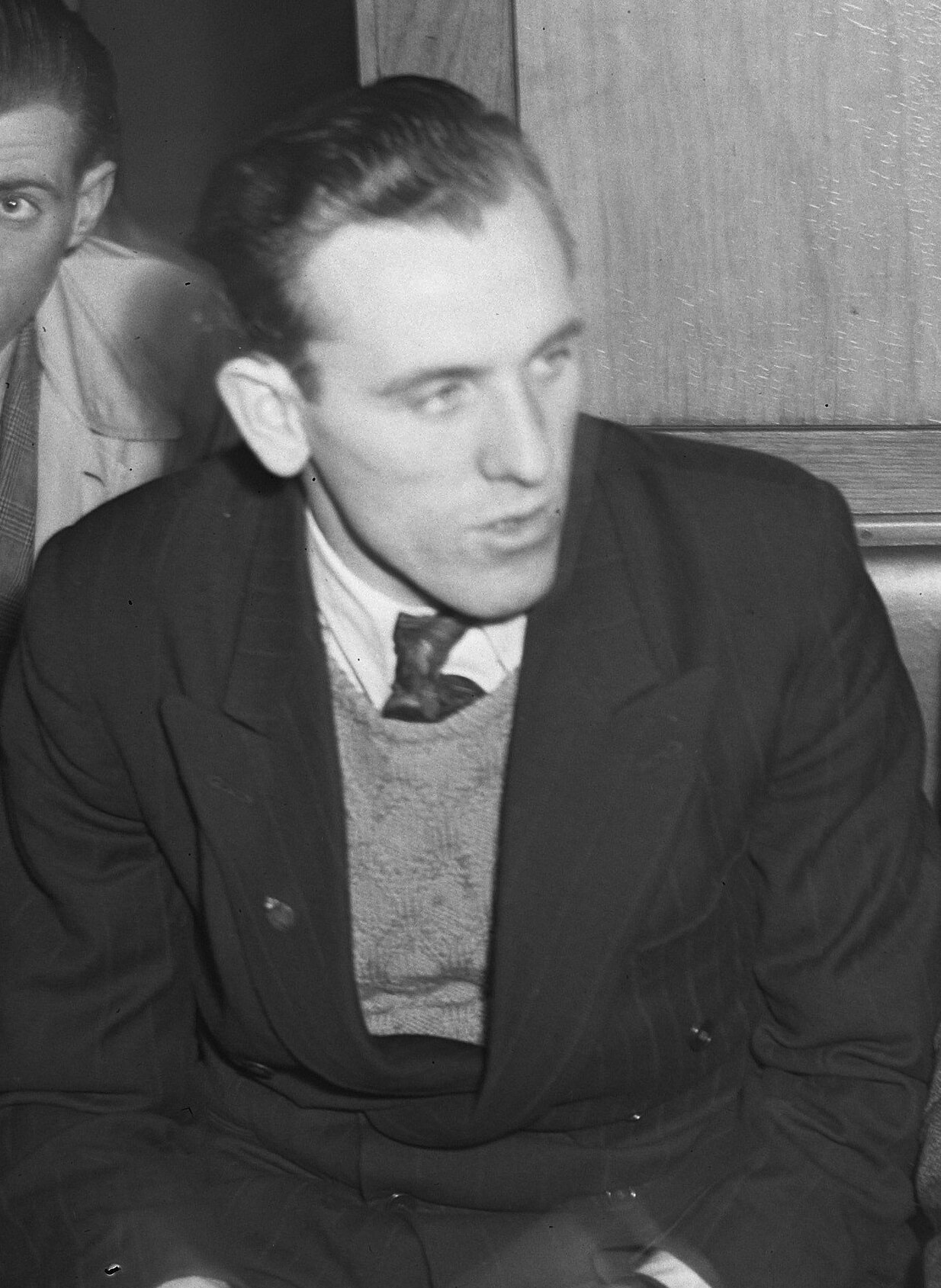
- Schrumpf in 1950

Personal information
- Full name: Johannes Schrumpf
- Date of birth: 9 November 1921
- Date of death: 25 June 2007 (aged 85)
- Position: Forward

Senior career*
Years	Team	Apps	(Gls)
- SV SVV

International career
1950	Netherlands	1	(0)
- * Club domestic league appearances and goals

Johannes Schrumpf (9 November 1921 – 25 June 2007) was a Dutch professional footballer who played as a forward for SV SVV. He made one appearance for the Netherlands national team in 1950.
