= Chris De Witte =

Belgian footballer (born 1978)

Personal information
- Date of birth: 13 January 1978 (age 48)
- Place of birth: Antwerp, Belgium
- Height: 1.84 m (6 ft 0 in)
- Position: Forward

Senior career*
Years	Team	Apps	(Gls)
1996–1998	Anderlecht	6	(1)
1998	→ FC Twente (loan)	15	(5)
1998–2003	FC Twente	113	(17)
2003–2004	FC Groningen	26	(2)
Total		160	(25)
- * Club domestic league appearances and goals

Chris De Witte (born 13 January 1978) is a Belgian former professional footballer who played as a forward. He represented R.S.C. Anderlecht in his native country, after which he went abroad to play for FC Twente and FC Groningen in the Netherlands.

== Honours ==
FC Twente

- KNVB Cup: 2000–01
