= Ruud van Nistelrooy =

Dutch professional footballer and manager

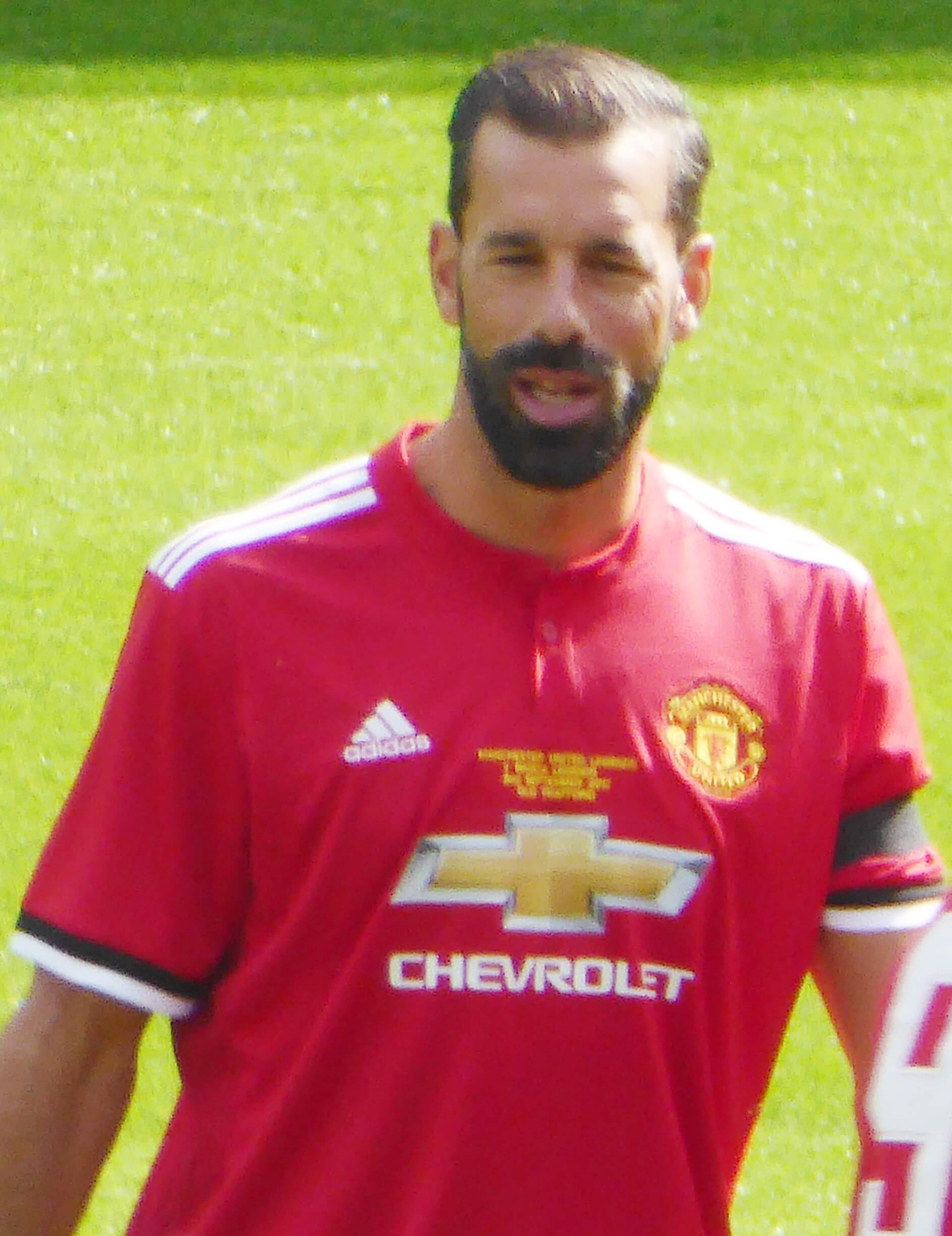
- Van Nistelrooy in 2017

Personal information
- Full name: Rutgerus Johannes Martinus van Nistelrooij
- Date of birth: 1 July 1976 (age 50)
- Place of birth: Oss, Netherlands
- Height: 1.88 m (6 ft 2 in)
- Position: Striker

Youth career
- 1981–1990: Nooit Gedacht
- 1990–1991: RKSV Margriet
- 1991–1993: Den Bosch

Senior career*
Years	Team	Apps	(Gls)
1993–1997	Den Bosch	69	(17)
1997–1998	Heerenveen	31	(13)
1998–2001	PSV Eindhoven	67	(62)
2001–2006	Manchester United	150	(95)
2006–2010	Real Madrid	68	(46)
2010–2011	Hamburger SV	36	(12)
2011–2012	Málaga	28	(4)
Total		449	(249)

International career
1997–1998	Netherlands U21	4	(0)
1998–2011	Netherlands	70	(35)

Managerial career
- 2021–2022: Jong PSV
- 2022–2023: PSV
- 2024: Manchester United (interim)
- 2024–2025: Leicester City
- 2026–: Netherlands (assistant)
- * Club domestic league appearances and goals

Rutgerus Johannes Martinus van Nistelrooij (Dutch pronunciation: [ˈryt fɑn ˈnɪstəlroːi]; born 1 July 1976), commonly known by his anglicised name of Ruud van Nistelrooy (/væn ˈnɪstəlrɔɪ/), is a Dutch professional football manager and former player. He is currently working as an assistant coach of the Netherlands national football team. Widely regarded as one of the best strikers of his generation, Van Nistelrooy was the top scorer in three UEFA Champions League seasons and is the all-time Dutch top goalscorer in the competition's history with 56 goals. He has also been the top scorer in three European domestic leagues. In 2004, he was listed in the FIFA 100 of the world's greatest living players.

Van Nistelrooy began his career with Den Bosch, before moving onto Heerenveen, eventually making a name for himself at PSV Eindhoven, where he won two Eredivisie titles. His goalscoring record at PSV attracted attention from Manchester United; a deal was in place in the summer of 2000, but because of injury problems, his move was secured a year later for a then British record fee of £19 million. His time at United was successful, winning the Premier League, FA Cup, Football League Cup, and FA Community Shield, along with winning the Sir Matt Busby Player of the Year twice. Van Nistelrooy scored 150 goals in just 219 games for United, as well as becoming at the time their all-time European record goalscorer, but fell out of favour towards the end of his tenure.

Real Madrid secured Van Nistelrooy's services in 2006. Although an injury blighted the end of his days with Madrid, he won La Liga twice and the Supercopa de España before signing for Hamburger SV during the January transfer window in 2010. After one and a half seasons with Hamburg, he moved back to Spain with Málaga in the summer of 2011. He retired as a player in 2012.

Internationally, Van Nistelrooy represented the Netherlands on 70 occasions, netting 35 times. He was part of the Euro 2004, 2006 World Cup, and Euro 2008 squads.

== Club career ==
=== Early career ===
Born in Oss, North Brabant, Van Nistelrooy started his career in 1993, aged 17, with Dutch Eerste Divisie side Den Bosch, where he was converted from a central midfielder to centre-forward, after playing for local clubs Nooit Gedacht and RKSV Margriet. After netting 12 goals in 31 games in the 1996–97 campaign, he transferred for €360,000 to Heerenveen the next year, and scored 13 goals in 31 matches in his only season with the club.

=== PSV ===
Van Nistelrooy was signed by PSV Eindhoven ahead of the 1998–99 season for €6.3 million, a then-record transfer sum between two Dutch teams. Manager Bobby Robson started with him as a substitute, but he went on to score 31 goals in 34 matches, the highest season total in the Eredivisie and second-highest in Europe overall, in addition to scoring all three of PSV's goals in a Champions League match against HJK Helsinki on 25 November 1998. Van Nistelrooy capped off the year by winning the Dutch Player of the Year award. The following season, he won his second Eredivisie scoring title with 29 goals.

Van Nistelrooy looked set to complete a club record £18.5 million transfer to English club Manchester United in the summer of 2000. He was to be unveiled at a press conference four days later, but this was instead used to announce that the transfer had been postponed over concerns about his fitness, having not played for a month due to problems with his knee. The transfer was then cancelled after PSV refused to agree to further medical tests, and the next day he suffered a rupture to his anterior cruciate knee ligaments during a training session, leaving him injured for a year.

=== Manchester United ===
A year later, Van Nistelrooy signed a five-year contract with Manchester United after passing his medical. He downplayed United's £19 million investment to reporters, saying, "The price is not heavy for me – it lifts me up because it means United have big confidence in me." According to a 2001 interview with The Daily Telegraph, Manchester United coach Sir Alex Ferguson said that his son, Darren, who was at try-outs for Eredivisie rival Heerenveen at the time, begged his father, "You've got to sign Van Nistelrooy right away, he's fantastic. We've been watching him." Ferguson sent team representatives to PSV's next league game and signed Van Nistelrooy the next day.

==== 2001–02 ====
Van Nistelrooy made his debut in the Charity Shield against Liverpool, scoring in a 2–1 loss. On 19 August, Van Nistelrooy made his Premier League debut against Fulham at Old Trafford, and scored two goals to help United to a 3–2 win. He scored his first Champions League goals on 17 October in a 3–2 loss to Deportivo La Coruña.

On 22 December, Van Nistelrooy scored his first Premier League hat-trick in a 6–1 win against Southampton. In the FA Cup, Van Nistelrooy started on the bench for the third round tie against Aston Villa due to a groin strain, but was substituted on for Luke Chadwick in the second-half with United 2–0 down and scored two "sublime" goals in three minutes to help United advance to the fourth round with a 3–2 win.

In total, during his first season, Van Nistelrooy netted 23 goals in 32 league games. He broke the record he shared with Mark Stein, Alan Shearer and Thierry Henry, by scoring in eight consecutive league games. He also scored ten Champions League goals, and was named the PFA Players' Player of the Year.

==== 2002–03 ====
The following season, he finished as the top Premier League scorer with 25 goals in 34 games, with a goal on the final day against Everton earning him the Golden Boot ahead of Arsenal's Thierry Henry. His tally included three hat-tricks against Newcastle United, Fulham, and Charlton Athletic. He also scored in each of the final eight games of the season as United won the title. Van Nistelrooy won the Premier League Player of the Season in 2003. He was accredited with spearheading the title win for United with a goal tally that was described as "astonishing". After scoring 12 Champions League goals in nine consecutive matches, he was named by UEFA as the best striker in Europe.

==== 2003–04 ====
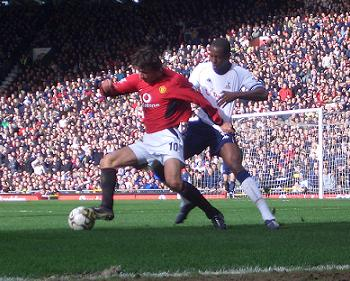
Van Nistelrooy (left) playing for Manchester United versus Tottenham Hotspur in 2004

My ambition is to combine the best of No. 9 and No. 10, as a striker who is also a team player and creator.

— Van Nistelrooy in 2003.

Van Nistelrooy started the 2003–04 season by scoring twice in his first two league matches. This meant he had scored in 10 consecutive league games, then a Premier League record, which stood until 2015 when Jamie Vardy scored in 11 consecutive matches. In the 0–0 draw on 21 September 2003, later dubbed the Battle of Old Trafford, Van Nistelrooy was at the centre of one of the most infamous incidents of the Arsenal–Manchester United rivalry. After missing a last-minute penalty that would have won the game for United, Van Nistelrooy was attacked by Martin Keown, prompting a melee involving several players from both sides; five Arsenal players including Keown received various bans and fines, while the club itself received a record fine of £175,000. Earlier in the game, he had been fouled by Patrick Vieira, who was sent off for a second bookable offence. Vieira and his manager Arsène Wenger both accused Van Nistelrooy of cheating and stamping on Vieira, prompting a vociferous defence by Alex Ferguson.

On 27 September, he scored a hat-trick against Leicester City in a 4–1 victory. He scored his 100th goal for the club in a dramatic 4–3 victory over Everton on 7 February 2004.

In the FA Cup fifth round derby against Manchester City, Van Nistelrooy scored twice to help ten-man United win 4–2, and again scored twice in the quarter-final against Fulham as United came from behind to win 2–1. He scored a further two goals, including one penalty, in United's victory over Millwall in the 2004 FA Cup Final.

==== 2004–05 ====
Van Nistelrooy missed a large part of the 2004–05 season due to injury, but nonetheless scored a Champions League-best eight goals. One of them was his 30th career European goal, which he scored in a 2–2 Champions League group stage draw with Lyon on 15 September 2004, overtaking Denis Law's previous club record of 28 goals. Law later said to reporters, "I'm delighted for Ruud. It could not happen to a nicer guy."

On 24 October, Arsenal returned to Old Trafford for another dramatic fixture. The Gunners entered the fixture with a 49-game unbeaten run and had been dubbed "The Invincibles", but United won the game 2–0. Van Nistelrooy scored the opening goal from the penalty spot, atoning for the penalty miss the previous year, with Wayne Rooney scoring a second. Van Nistelrooy was later banned for three games for a foul on Ashley Cole that the referee had missed. On 3 November, Van Nistelrooy scored all four goals in a 4–1 win against Sparta Prague. On 17 April 2005, he scored two goals in the FA Cup semi-final in a 4–1 win against Newcastle, but United lost the final on penalties to Arsenal.

==== 2005–06 ====
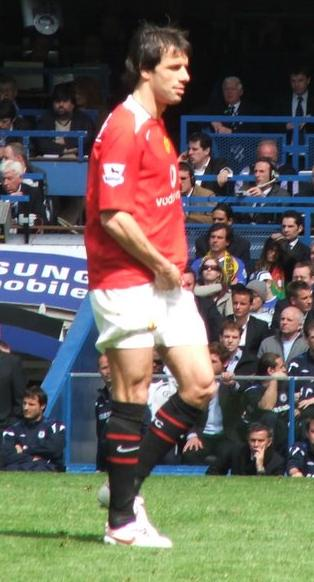
Van Nistelrooy in United colours against Chelsea

At the start of the 2005–06 season, Van Nistelrooy scored in United's first four Premier League games. He finished as the second-highest league scorer with 21 goals, behind Arsenal's Thierry Henry. However, he was named as a substitute for the League Cup Final against Wigan Athletic, fuelling speculation of a rift between him and Alex Ferguson, which Van Nistelrooy denied. He was nonetheless left on the bench for six consecutive league matches, and though he then returned to the starting line-up and scored match-winners against West Ham United and Bolton Wanderers, fresh doubt spread over Van Nistelrooy's future when he was benched for United's season finale win over Charlton Athletic. Ferguson said that Van Nistelrooy was angry at the decision and left the stadium three hours before kick-off.

On 9 May 2006, it was reported that Van Nistelrooy's exclusion from the squad was due to a training session fight between him and teammate Cristiano Ronaldo. Van Nistelrooy allegedly criticised Ronaldo's tendency to hold onto the ball instead of passing to his teammates, which sparked the fight, after which Van Nistelrooy remarked, "What are you going to do? Complain to your daddy?" This was in reference to United's Portuguese assistant manager, Carlos Queiroz, but Ronaldo took the statement literally and allegedly broke into tears since his father, José had died eight months previously. Van Nistelrooy later apologised to Ferguson for his behaviour in the previous few months.

Van Nistelrooy signed with Spanish La Liga side Real Madrid on 28 July, departing Old Trafford after five seasons with a total of 150 goals in 219 appearances, with his final goal coming on 1 April against Bolton, scoring what proved to be the winning goal. With 38 goals, he is also the club's second all-time European goalscorer, behind Wayne Rooney.

=== Real Madrid ===
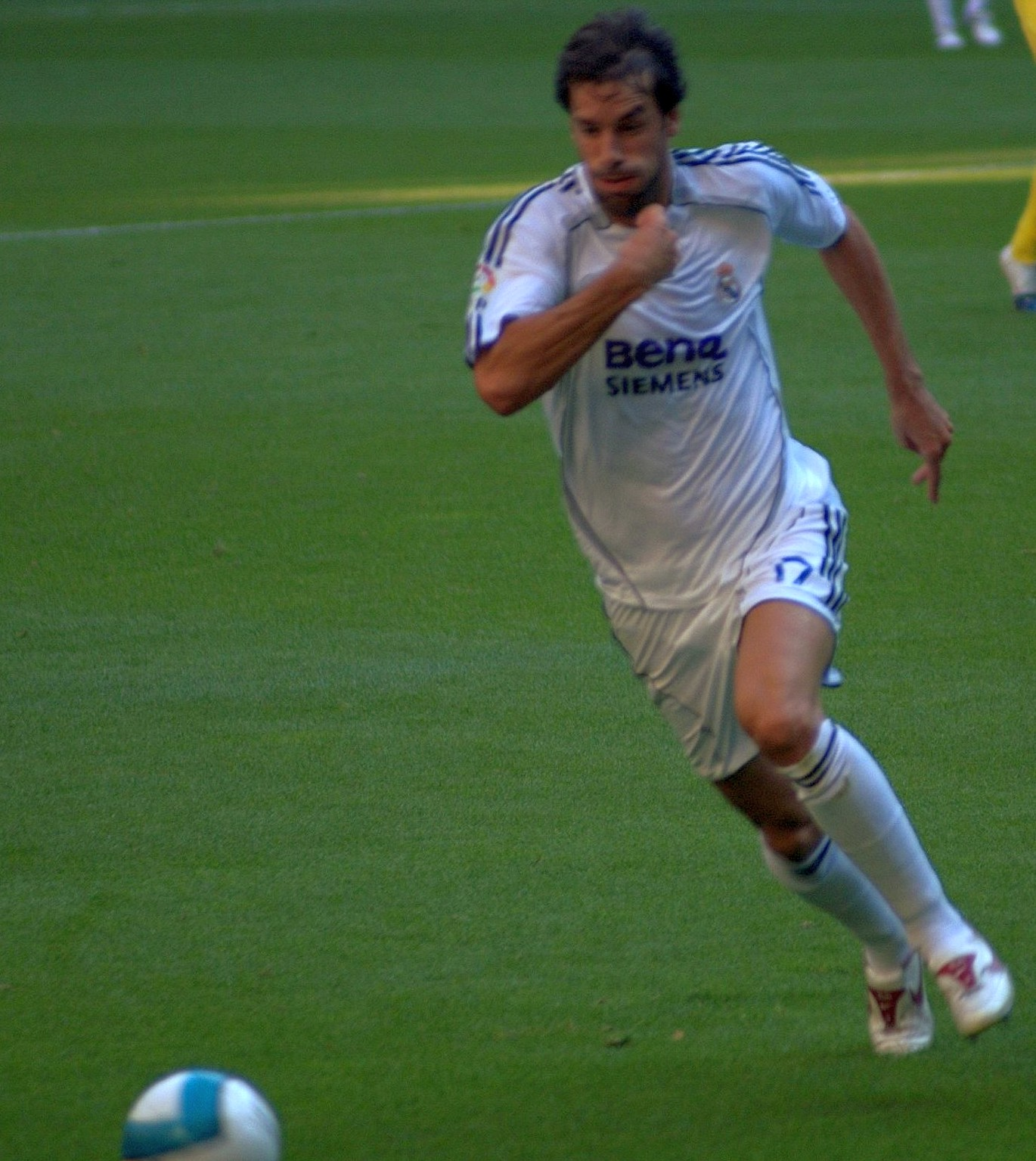
Van Nistelrooy playing for Real Madrid during a league game to Villarreal

On 15 July 2006, Ferguson confirmed that Van Nistelrooy wanted to leave Manchester United and Real Madrid announced two weeks later that he had signed a three-year contract after being purchased for €14 million.

Van Nistelrooy made his debut for the Spanish club in a 1–0 friendly win over Reggina on 4 August 2006. Van Nistelrooy scored a hat-trick in his second league match against Levante and, on 12 November 2006, he scored all four of Real Madrid's goals in a 4–1 victory over Osasuna. For the first six months he was a teammate of Ronaldo, a player whom Van Nistelrooy regards as the best he ever played with. Van Nistelrooy won the league's Pichichi award with 25 goals as Real Madrid took home the 2006–07 title, and he also equalled the longest consecutive scoring streak in La Liga history with seven straight matches, tying a league record shared by Hugo Sánchez.

In January 2008, Van Nistelrooy signed a contract extension keeping him with Madrid until 2010, with the expiration date one day shy of his 34th birthday. He underwent ankle surgery in March, and returned for the El Clásico derby against Barcelona on 7 May, in which he netted a penalty two minutes after coming on as a substitute. He finished the season with 20 goals in 33 appearances.

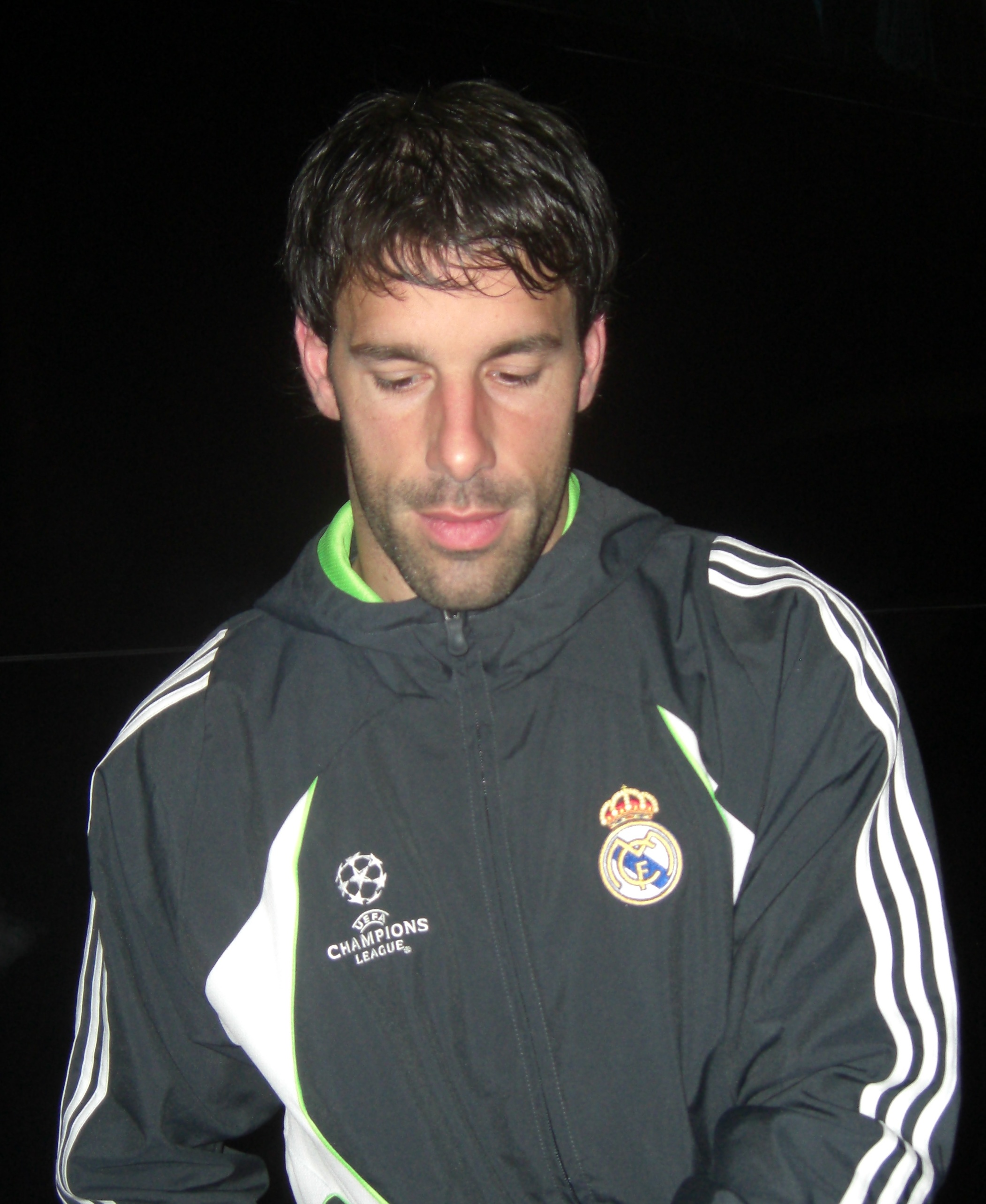
Van Nistelrooy signing autographs in 2007

In November 2008, Real Madrid announced that Van Nistelrooy would miss the remainder of the 2008–09 season after exploratory arthroscopic surgery revealed a partially torn meniscus in his right knee, with an expected recovery time of six to nine months following a second operation to repair the damage. Van Nistelrooy travelled to the United States to see specialist Richard Steadman, who had previously operated on the same knee back in 2000. At the time of his injury, he had 10 goals in 12 club appearances for the season. Following the injury, he was de-registered by Real Madrid for the rest of the 2008–09 season, and his shirt number was given to Dani Parejo. On 24 August 2009, in the last pre-season match before the start of La Liga, Van Nistelrooy stepped on the pitch for the first time since his injury and played the last 15 minutes of the game against Rosenborg, substituting Kaká. Van Nistelrooy came on for Cristiano Ronaldo in the 80th minute against Xerez in his first La Liga match since recovering from his injury. In the 81st minute, he provided the assist for a Karim Benzema goal, following it with his own 88th-minute goal. During his strike, however, he picked up a thigh injury, where it was later revealed by Real Madrid that he would be out from first team action for up to six weeks. On 27 October, Van Nistelrooy made his second comeback of the season coming on as a substitute for Raúl in the 71st minute against Alcorcón in the Copa del Rey.

=== Hamburger SV ===
On 23 January 2010, Van Nistelrooy signed an 18-month contract with the German club Hamburger SV until June 2011. He made his first appearance for the club after coming off the bench in the last two minutes of Hamburg's 3–3 draw with 1. FC Köln on 6 February. Van Nistelrooy scored his first two goals for Hamburg on 13 February 2010 against VfB Stuttgart in the 75th and 77th minutes of a 3–1 win, after entering the game just a few minutes prior. On 11 March 2010, he scored his first UEFA Europa League goal in the 41st minute of Hamburg's match against Anderlecht.

Van Nistelrooy scored his only competitive hat-trick with Hamburg on 15 August 2010, in a 5–1 win over Torgelower SV Greif in the first round of the 2010–11 DFB-Pokal. On 21 August 2010, he scored a brace in Hamburg's season opener against Schalke 04, which HSV won 2–1. During that match, he played against his friend and former Real Madrid teammate Raúl, who was making his Bundesliga debut. In the January transfer window, Van Nistelrooy was linked a return move back to Real Madrid and could be used for a short-term basis to cover, following injuries of Gonzalo Higuaín and Karim Benzema as manager José Mourinho would be happy for Van Nistelrooy to join the club as Mourinho left the door for him. Van Nistelrooy admitted he seriously considered moving back to the club if the bid happened. The club, however, rejected Madrid's bid for Van Nistelrooy, giving the club a warning as Hamburg wants to keep hold of him until the transfer window ended. Despite being angered over his move to Real Madrid rejected, Van Nistelrooy said he would remain committed at Hamburg. During a match between Hamburg and Hannover 96 on 16 April 2011, Van Nistelrooy suffered a calf injury that kept him out until the last matchday.

Van Nistelrooy netted seven goals and made two assists in 25 appearances in his only full season with Hamburg.

=== Málaga ===
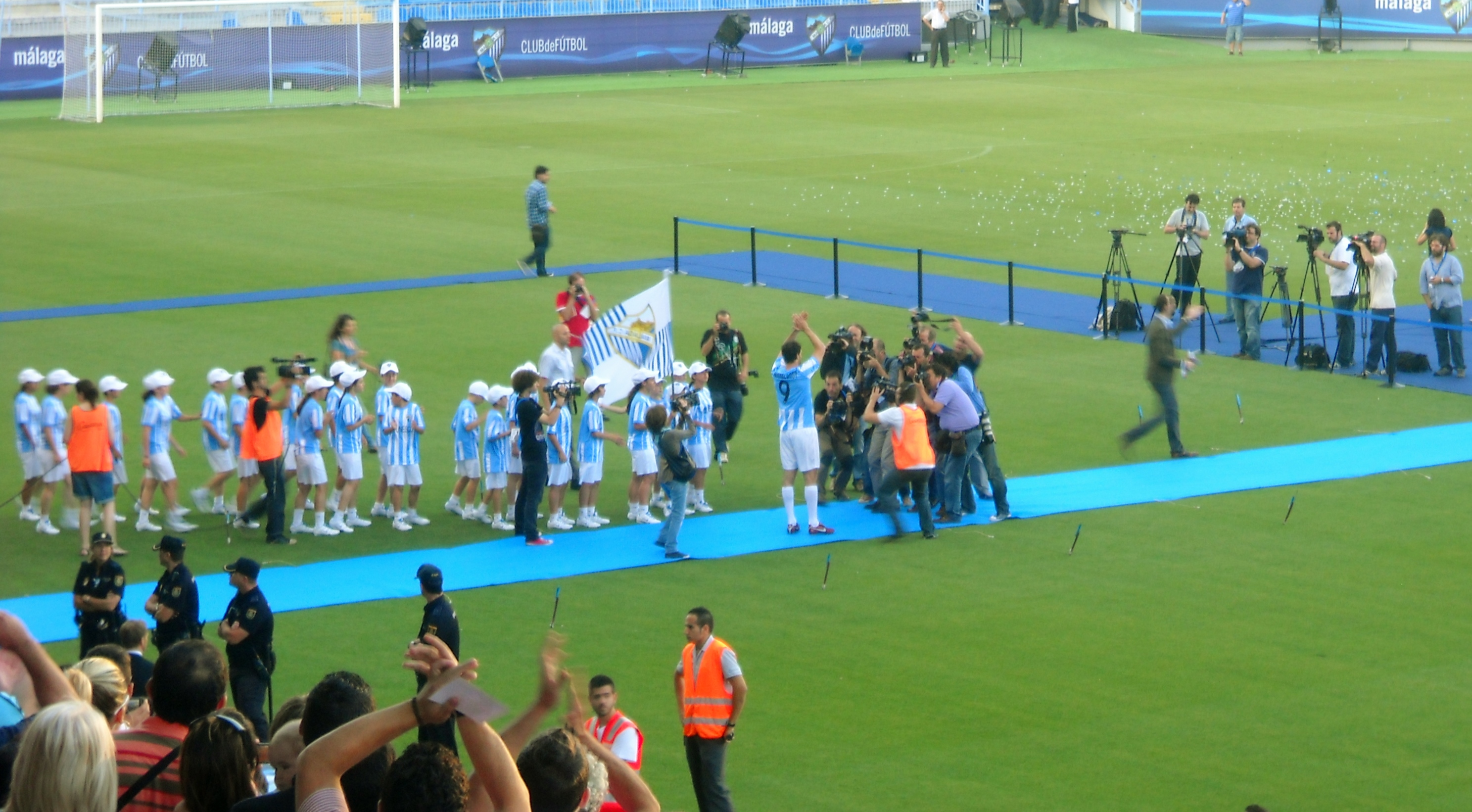
Van Nistelrooy being introduced as a Málaga player

On 1 June 2011, Van Nistelrooy returned to Spain to pen a one-year deal with La Liga side Málaga, on a free transfer. Van Nistelrooy was presented at La Rosaleda Stadium as he was welcomed by 15,000 Málaga fans. He made his debut in a 2–1 loss against Sevilla on the opening game of the 2011–12 season.

Van Nistelrooy registered his first goal on 1 October 2011 against Getafe. On 21 December, against the same club, he opened the scoring with a volley as Málaga won 3–2 on aggregate in the Copa del Rey. Later on in the season, Van Nistelrooy scored two more goals in the league against Espanyol and Racing Santander, with the latter being his final goal of his career. Just one day before his retirement, Van Nistelrooy made his last appearance of his career, coming on as a substitute in the 75th minute for goalscorer Salomón Rondón, who scored the only goal in Málaga's league match against Sporting Gijón.

On 14 May 2012, Van Nistelrooy announced his retirement from football at the age of 35. He told Sport1 he previously made hints that his football career was coming to an end after insisting Málaga would be his last club.

== International career ==
=== Early international career ===
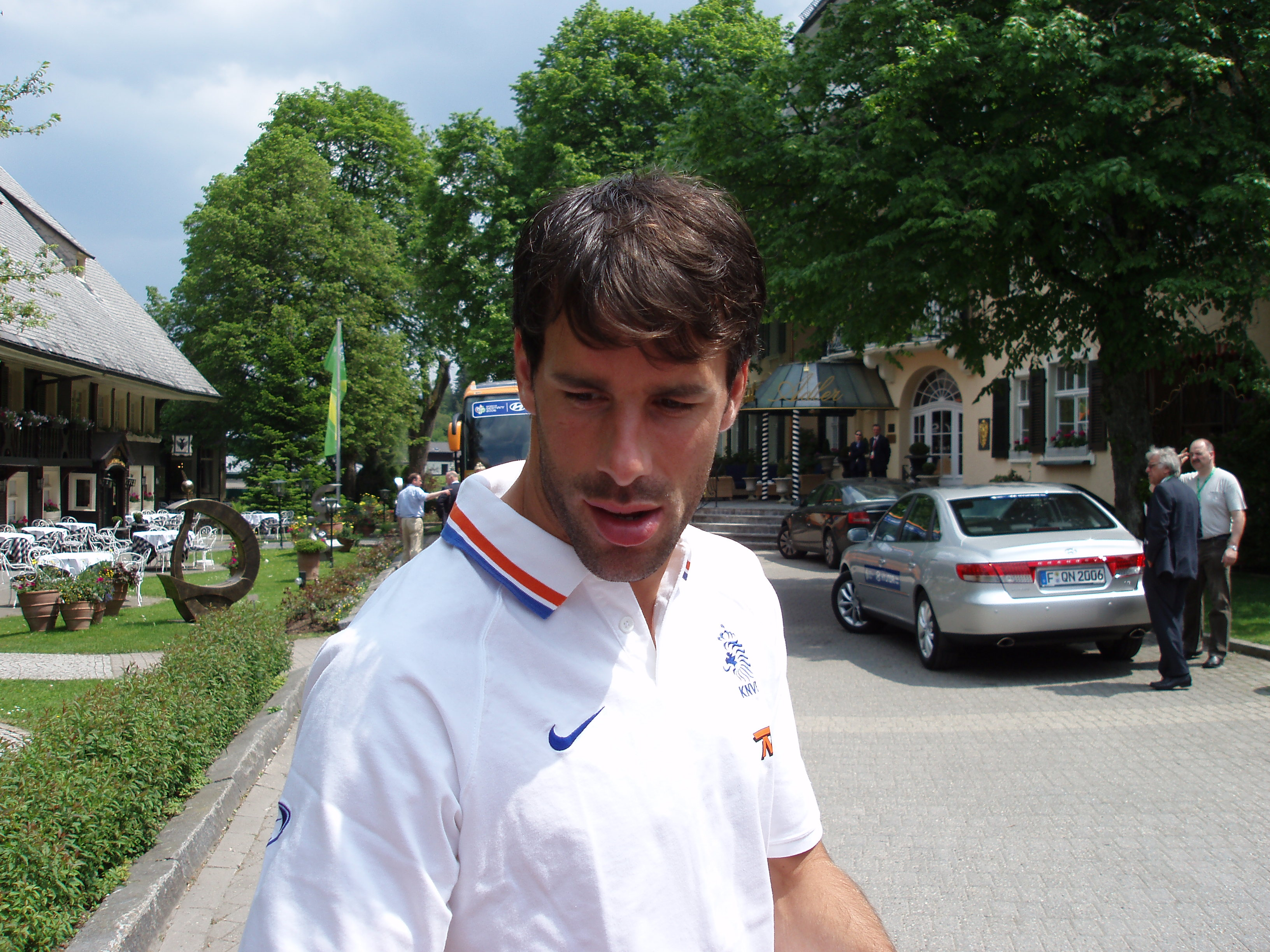
Van Nistelrooy with the Netherlands during the 2006 World Cup

Van Nistelrooy, who earned 70 appearances and scored 35 goals for the Netherlands, made his international debut in a friendly match against Germany on 18 November 1998. However, a cruciate ligament injury – which postponed his transfer to Manchester United – also ruled Van Nistelrooy out of Euro 2000.

The Netherlands failed to qualify for the 2002 World Cup, being beaten to a playoff place by the Republic of Ireland. On 19 November 2003, Van Nistelrooy scored a hat-trick in a 6–0 win over Scotland in the UEFA Euro 2004 qualification playoffs, ensuring a place in the finals with a 6–1 aggregate victory. At the finals in Portugal, he scored in a draw with Germany, a loss to the Czech Republic and twice in a 3–0 win over Latvia, to become the only player other than Czech Milan Baroš to net in all three group games at the tournament.

=== Initial retirement and return ===
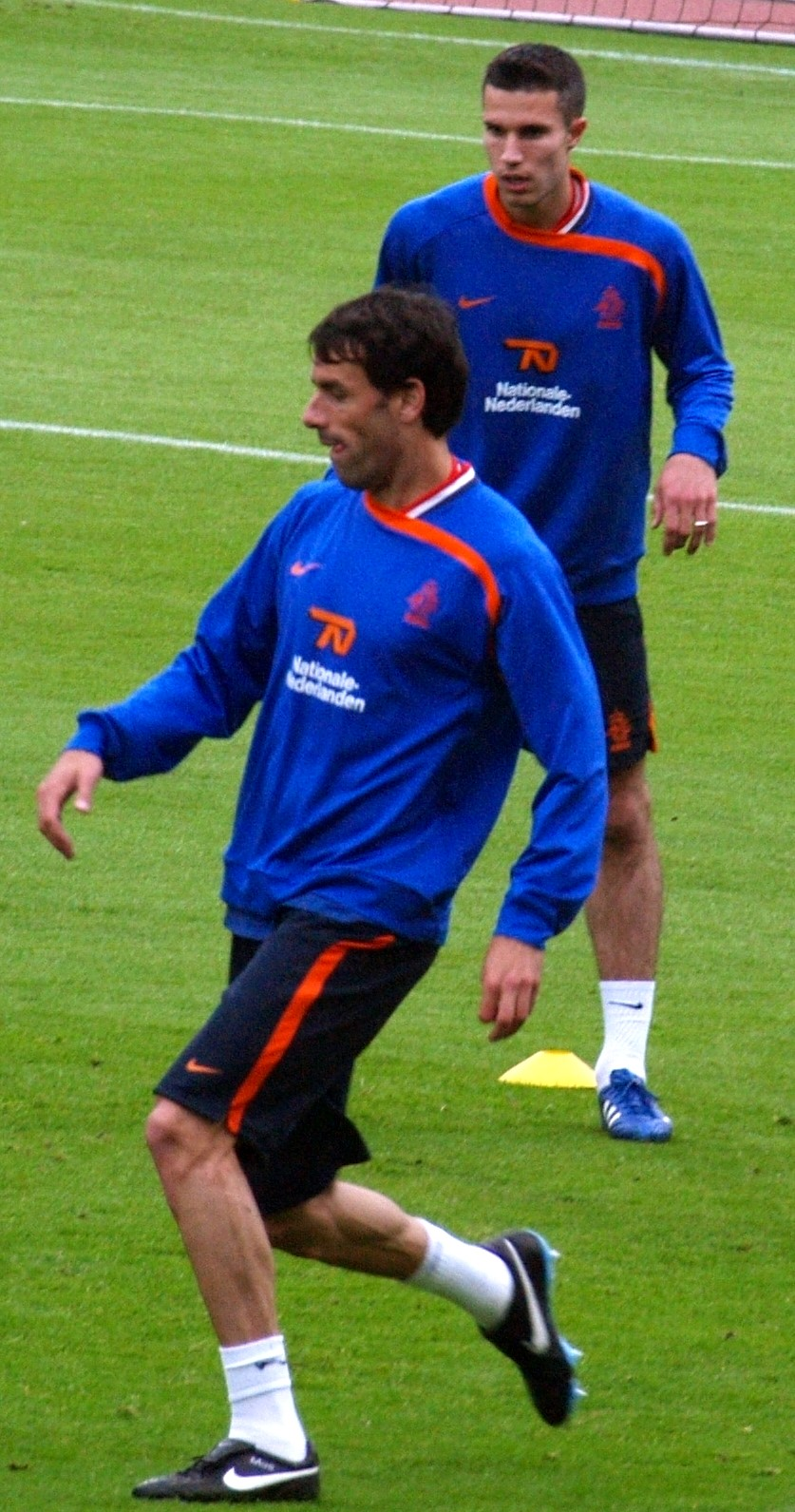
Van Nistelrooy (front) with Robin van Persie in 2008

During a 2006 World Cup qualifying match, Nistelrooy scored in the 4–0 victory for the Netherlands against bottom-placed Andorra and was yellow-carded for going to Andorra player Antoni Lima and celebrating in front of him, following an incident six minutes before when Van Nistelrooy missed a penalty and Lima laughed at him. He was a part of coach Marco van Basten's squad for the 2006 World Cup finals, for which he served as the official FIFA/SOS ambassador. He started, and was substituted, in all of the Netherlands' group stage matches, and scored his lone goal against the Ivory Coast. Van Nistelrooy was dropped to the bench by Van Basten without an explanation for the Netherlands' second round match, which saw them again eliminated by Portugal.

Van Basten left Nistelrooy out of the squad for a friendly match against the Republic of Ireland on 16 August 2006, and Dirk Kuyt replaced him in their next match against Portugal in September. After Klaas-Jan Huntelaar was unavailable for Euro 2008 qualifiers against Bulgaria and Belarus due to injury, Van Nistelrooy refused Van Basten's request to take his place on the team.

On 23 January 2007, Van Nistelrooy announced his retirement from international football following continued disputes with Van Basten, which had started back in 2006 during the course of the World Cup finals matches. However, after several phone conversations and at the persuasion of veteran goalkeeper Edwin van der Sar, both player and coach put aside their differences. Van Basten announced four months later that Van Nistelrooy was returning to the Oranje. On 8 September, Van Nistelrooy filled Huntelaar's spot – as previously requested – for the UEFA Euro 2008 qualifying against Bulgaria, scoring in a 2–0 victory, and scored the winning goal four days later in injury time of the Netherlands' win over Albania.

=== European Championships and 2010 FIFA World Cup ===
At Euro 2008, Van Nistelrooy scored for the Netherlands in their decisive 3–0 victory against Italy in the group stage, and scored the equaliser in their eventual 3–1 loss against Russia in the quarter-finals. On 4 August, he again announced his retirement from international competition.

During the 2010 FIFA World Cup, Van Nistelrooy was left out by the Netherlands' new coach Bert van Marwijk. After being left out for the World Cup, Van Nistelrooy said he had no choices except to face the fact that his international career is finished.

After main striker Robin van Persie suffered an injury during a match with his club Arsenal, Van Marwijk gave Van Nistelrooy a chance to reclaim his position as the main striker of the Netherlands' national team. Van Nistelrooy was invited to two Netherlands' Group E qualification matches for Euro 2012 against San Marino and Finland. He scored in the 5–0 victory against San Marino on 3 September 2010.

Van Nistelrooy was recalled to the team in March 2011 for two Euro 2012 qualification matches against Hungary after injuries of strikers Klaas-Jan Huntelaar, Arjen Robben, and Theo Janssen. In the away match on 25 March, he appeared as a late substitute for Dirk Kuyt while in the return game in Amsterdam four days later, he came off the bench to score his 35th international goal. adding it is "wonderful to be able to add something to this Oranje team", as he told Berend Scholten.

== Style of play ==
A highly prolific goalscorer, Van Nistelrooy was known for being extremely clinical and opportunistic in front of goal, and stood out throughout his career for his outstanding striking ability and finishing ability with either foot as well as his head, which earned him a reputation as one of the best strikers of his generation. Due to his excellent positional sense, quick reactions and intelligent offensive movement, he excelled at finding space in the penalty area and at anticipating his opponents movement to the ball. He was also known for his ability to time his runs to escape his markers, beat the offside trap, and get on the end of his teammates' passes; his tendency to be in the right place at the right time in the box saw him occasionally labelled as a "poacher" in the media.

A well-rounded centre-forward, in addition to his eye for goal, Van Nistelrooy was gifted with pace, physical strength, and shooting power, as well as excellent technical skills, and an ability to hold up the ball with his back to goal and link-up with his teammates or provide them with assists, due to his ability to read the game. He was also an accurate penalty taker. In spite of his talent and goalscoring ability, however, at times he drew criticism from managers, players and pundits for his controversial behaviour, as well as for having a tendency to be selfish, overly flamboyant, or for his penchant for simulation.

== Coaching career ==
=== PSV under-17s ===
On 22 June 2013, Van Nistelrooy joined PSV as a coaching intern working with the under-17s. He was revealed as the new striker coach of the under-17s, 19s and the reserve team in February 2016.

=== Netherlands ===
In March 2014, it was announced that Van Nistelrooy would be assisting Guus Hiddink after the 2014 World Cup.

=== PSV under-19s ===
On 25 June 2018, Van Nistelrooy became the new manager of the PSV under-19s, taking over Mark van Bommel, who left his role for the senior team.

In December 2019 it was confirmed, that Van Nistelrooy beside his position at PSV, also had been added to Ronald Koeman's Netherlands backroom staff as an assistant manager together with Maarten Stekelenburg ahead of the Euro 2020, after Kees van Wonderen recently had left the position.

=== PSV first team ===
In March 2022, Van Nistelrooy was appointed as the replacement for the outgoing Roger Schmidt as PSV's head coach. He signed a three-year contract beginning with the 2022–23 season. After winning the 2022 Johan Cruyff Shield and 2022–23 KNVB Cup, he resigned with one match remaining in the 2022–23 Eredivisie season, citing a lack of support.

=== Manchester United ===
On 11 July 2024, Van Nistelrooy was appointed as an assistant coach for Premier League club Manchester United on a two-year contract. He was originally tasked to work alongside Erik ten Hag; however, following the sacking of the latter on 28 October, he was appointed as interim head coach. Two days later in his first game, he led Manchester United to a 5–2 win over Leicester City in the EFL Cup. On 7 November, Van Nistelrooy led his club to their first European win in 13 months in a 2–0 win against PAOK. In what would be his final game in charge, he oversaw a 3–0 league win, again over Leicester City. Upon the arrival of new head coach Ruben Amorim, Van Nistelrooy departed the club. He finished his tenure as interim manager with three wins and one draw in four matches.

=== Leicester City ===
On 29 November 2024, Van Nistelrooy was appointed manager of Premier League club Leicester City on a two-and-a-half-year deal running until June 2027, replacing Steve Cooper. On 3 December 2024, he got his first win as a Premier League manager, in his home debut game and winning 3–1 against West Ham United. Leicester then followed up the win by drawing 2–2 with Brighton at home on 8 December 2024.

Following the draw with Brighton, Leicester began a bleak run of form of only one win in 17 games, with a 4–0 away defeat to Newcastle United on 14 December 2024, then a 3–0 loss at home to relegation rivals Wolverhampton Wanderers. The defeat to Wolves began a run of eight losses in a row at home for the Foxes without scoring, which was a new record in English football. On 26 January 2025, he won his first away game at Tottenham Hotspur 2–1, and that saw the Foxes end a run of eight games without a win.

On 20 April 2025, Leicester were relegated to the Championship after losing 1–0 at home to league leaders Liverpool. This left the Foxes 18 points off safety with five games to play and extended their run of home losses without scoring to nine games, also giving Leicester the record of the first team in top flight history to go nine games without scoring at home.

On 27 June 2025, van Nistelrooy left Leicester by mutual consent.

=== Netherlands ===
On 16 January 2026, Van Nistelrooy was announced as assistant coach of the Netherlands national team, and would commence in the role on 1 February 2026, in preparation for the upcoming 2026 FIFA World Cup in North America.

== Outside football ==
=== Personal life ===
Van Nistelrooy married his girlfriend and former professional cyclist, Leontien Slaats, in July 2004. The couple have a daughter and a son. Van Nistelrooy is a Roman Catholic.

=== Charity ===
Van Nistelrooy and his wife are both heavily involved with the charity organization SOS Children's Villages. The organization has been around since 1949 and is an international development charity which serves to protect the interests and rights of children. Van Nistelrooy was officially appointed "FIFA for SOS Children's Villages" Ambassador in the Netherlands on 1 September 2001.

On 17 November 2009, Van Nistelrooy and his wife hosted SOS at Ciudad Real Madrid. The purpose of the event was to help create a calendar which would be sold to benefit the organisation.

=== Endorsements ===
Van Nistelrooy was sponsored by sportswear company Nike and appeared in Nike commercials. In a global Nike advertising campaign in the run-up to the 2002 World Cup in Korea and Japan, he starred in a "Secret Tournament" commercial (branded "Scorpion KO") directed by Terry Gilliam, appearing alongside football players such as Thierry Henry, Ronaldo, Edgar Davids, Fabio Cannavaro, Francesco Totti, Ronaldinho, Luís Figo and Hidetoshi Nakata, with former player Eric Cantona as the tournament "referee".

=== Media career ===
During the 2014 World Cup, Van Nistelrooy worked as a studio analyst for ESPN.

== Career statistics ==
=== Club ===
Appearances and goals by club, season and competition
Club	Season	League			National cup (Note: Includes KNVB Cup, FA Cup, Copa del Rey, DFB-Pokal)		League cup (Note: Includes Football League Cup)		Europe		Other		Total	
Club	Season	Division	Apps	Goals	Apps	Goals	Apps	Goals	Apps	Goals	Apps	Goals	Apps	Goals
Den Bosch	1993–94	Eerste Divisie	2	0	0	0	—		—		—		2	0
Den Bosch	1994–95	Eerste Divisie	15	3	2	3	—		—		–		17	6
Den Bosch	1995–96	Eerste Divisie	21	2	0	0	—		—		—		21	2
Den Bosch	1996–97	Eerste Divisie	31	12	0	0	—		—		—		31	12
Den Bosch	Total		69	17	2	3	—		—		—		71	20
Heerenveen	1997–98	Eredivisie	31	13	5	3	—		4 (Note: Appearances in UEFA Intertoto Cup)	0	—		40	16
PSV	1998–99	Eredivisie	34	31	4	4	—		7 (Note: Appearances in UEFA Champions League)	6	1 (Note: Appearance in Johan Cruyff Shield)	0	46	41
PSV	1999–2000	Eredivisie	23	29	1	0	—		8	3	—		32	32
PSV	2000–01	Eredivisie	10	2	2	2	—		—		—		12	4
PSV	Total		67	62	7	6	—		15	9	1	0	90	77
Manchester United	2001–02	Premier League	32	23	2	2	0	0	14	10	1 (Note: Appearance in FA Community Shield)	1	49	36
Manchester United	2002–03	Premier League	34	25	3	4	4	1	11	14	0	0	52	44
Manchester United	2003–04	Premier League	32	20	4	6	0	0	7	4	1	0	44	30
Manchester United	2004–05	Premier League	17	6	3	2	0	0	7	8	0	0	27	16
Manchester United	2005–06	Premier League	35	21	2	0	2	1	8	2	0	0	47	24
Manchester United	Total		150	95	14	14	6	2	47	38	2	1	219	150
Real Madrid	2006–07	La Liga	37	25	3	2	—		7	6	0	0	47	33
Real Madrid	2007–08	La Liga	24	16	1	0	—		7	4	1 (Note: Appearances in Supercopa de España)	0	33	20
Real Madrid	2008–09	La Liga	6	4	0	0	—		4	3	2	3	12	10
Real Madrid	2009–10	La Liga	1	1	2	0	—		1	0	0	0	4	1
Real Madrid	Total		68	46	6	2	—		19	13	3	3	96	64
Hamburger SV	2009–10	Bundesliga	11	5	0	0	—		7 (Note: Appearances in UEFA Europa League)	2	0	0	18	7
Hamburger SV	2010–11	Bundesliga	25	7	1	3	—		—		—		26	10
Hamburger SV	Total		36	12	1	3	—		7	2	0	0	44	17
Málaga	2011–12	La Liga	28	4	4	1	—		—		—		32	5
Career total			449	249	39	32	6	2	92	62	6	4	592	349

=== International ===
Appearances and goals by national team and year
National team	Year	Apps	Goals
Netherlands	1998	1	0
Netherlands	1999	8	1
Netherlands	2000	1	0
Netherlands	2001	7	7
Netherlands	2002	4	1
Netherlands	2003	8	5
Netherlands	2004	11	6
Netherlands	2005	9	5
Netherlands	2006	5	3
Netherlands	2007	5	2
Netherlands	2008	5	3
Netherlands	2009	0	0
Netherlands	2010	3	1
Netherlands	2011	3	1
Total		70	35

Scores and results list the Netherlands' goal tally first, score column indicates score after each Van Nistelrooy goal.

List of international goals scored by Ruud van Nistelrooy
No.	Date	Venue	Cap	Opponent	Score	Result	Competition
1	28 April 1999	GelreDome, Arnhem, Netherlands	3	Morocco	1–2	1–2	Friendly
2	25 April 2001	Philips Stadion, Eindhoven, Netherlands	11	Cyprus	4–0	4–0	2002 FIFA World Cup qualification
3	2 June 2001	Lilleküla Stadium, Tallinn, Estonia	12	Estonia	2–2	4–2	2002 FIFA World Cup qualification
4	2 June 2001	Lilleküla Stadium, Tallinn, Estonia	12	Estonia	4–2	4–2	2002 FIFA World Cup qualification
5	15 August 2001	White Hart Lane, London, England	13	England	2–0	2–0	Friendly
6	5 September 2001	Philips Stadion, Eindhoven, Netherlands	15	Estonia	5–0	5–0	2002 FIFA World Cup qualification
7	6 October 2001	GelreDome, Arnhem, Netherlands	16	Andorra	3–0	4–0	2002 FIFA World Cup qualification
8	6 October 2001	GelreDome, Arnhem, Netherlands	16	Andorra	4–0	4–0	2002 FIFA World Cup qualification
9	20 November 2002	Arena AufSchalke, Gelsenkirchen, Germany	21	Germany	3–1	3–1	Friendly
10	29 March 2003	De Kuip, Rotterdam, Netherlands	23	Czech Republic	1–0	1–1	UEFA Euro 2004 qualifying
11	2 April 2003	Sheriff Stadium, Tiraspol, Moldova	24	Moldova	1–1	2–1	UEFA Euro 2004 qualifying
12	19 November 2003	Amsterdam Arena, Amsterdam, Netherlands	29	Scotland	3–0	6–0	UEFA Euro 2004 qualifying
13	19 November 2003	Amsterdam Arena, Amsterdam, Netherlands	29	Scotland	4–0	6–0	UEFA Euro 2004 qualifying
14	19 November 2003	Amsterdam Arena, Amsterdam, Netherlands	29	Scotland	6–0	6–0	UEFA Euro 2004 qualifying
15	15 June 2004	Estádio do Dragão, Porto, Portugal	34	Germany	1–1	1–1	UEFA Euro 2004
16	19 June 2004	Estádio Municipal de Aveiro, Aveiro, Portugal	35	Czech Republic	2–0	2–3	UEFA Euro 2004
17	23 June 2004	Estádio Municipal de Braga, Braga, Portugal	36	Latvia	1–0	3–0	UEFA Euro 2004
18	23 June 2004	Estádio Municipal de Braga, Braga, Portugal	36	Latvia	2–0	3–0	UEFA Euro 2004
19	13 October 2004	Amsterdam Arena, Amsterdam, Netherlands	39	Finland	2–1	3–1	2006 FIFA World Cup qualification
20	13 October 2004	Amsterdam Arena, Amsterdam, Netherlands	39	Finland	3–1	3–1	2006 FIFA World Cup qualification
21	30 March 2005	Philips Stadion, Eindhoven, Netherlands	42	Armenia	2–0	2–0	2006 FIFA World Cup qualification
22	8 June 2005	Helsinki Olympic Stadium, Helsinki, Finland	44	Finland	1–0	4–0	2006 FIFA World Cup qualification
23	3 September 2005	Hanrapetakan Stadium, Yerevan, Armenia	46	Armenia	1–0	1–0	2006 FIFA World Cup qualification
24	7 September 2005	Philips Stadion, Eindhoven, Netherlands	47	Andorra	3–0	4–0	2006 FIFA World Cup qualification
25	7 September 2005	Philips Stadion, Eindhoven, Netherlands	47	Andorra	4–0	4–0	2006 FIFA World Cup qualification
26	27 May 2006	De Kuip, Rotterdam, Netherlands	50	Cameroon	1–0	1–0	Friendly
27	4 June 2006	De Kuip, Rotterdam, Netherlands	51	Australia	1–0	1–1	Friendly
28	16 June 2006	Gottlieb-Daimler-Stadion, Stuttgart, Germany	53	Ivory Coast	2–0	2–1	2006 FIFA World Cup
29	8 September 2007	Amsterdam Arena, Amsterdam, Netherlands	56	Bulgaria	2–0	2–0	UEFA Euro 2008 qualifying
30	12 September 2007	Qemal Stafa Stadium, Tirana, Albania	57	Albania	1–0	1–0	UEFA Euro 2008 qualifying
31	29 May 2008	Philips Stadion, Eindhoven, Netherlands	60	Denmark	1–0	1–1	Friendly
32	9 June 2008	Stade de Suisse, Bern, Switzerland	62	Italy	1–0	3–0	UEFA Euro 2008
33	21 June 2008	St. Jakob-Park, Basel, Switzerland	64	Russia	1–1	1–3	UEFA Euro 2008
34	3 September 2010	Stadio Olimpico, Serravalle, San Marino	65	San Marino	5–0	5–0	UEFA Euro 2012 qualifying
35	29 March 2011	Amsterdam Arena, Amsterdam, Netherlands	70	Hungary	3–2	5–3	UEFA Euro 2012 qualifying

== Managerial statistics ==
As of match played 25 May 2025

Managerial record by team and tenure
Team	From	To	Record								Ref
Team	From	To	G	W	D	L	GF	GA	GD	Win %	Ref
Jong PSV	1 June 2021	18 May 2022	38	11	11	16	61	63	−2	28.95	
PSV Eindhoven	19 May 2022	24 May 2023	51	33	10	8	126	60	+66	64.71	
Manchester United (caretaker)	28 October 2024	10 November 2024	4	3	1	0	11	3	+8	75.00	
Leicester City	29 November 2024 (Note: Van Nistelrooy's appointment was announced on 29 November 2024, he was in the stand and not in charge of the game on 30 November as Leicester lost 4–1 against Brentford, which was taken by first team coach Ben Dawson. Van Nistelrooy's first match in charge was a 3–1 win over West Ham on 3 December.)	27 June 2025	27	5	3	19	24	57	−33	18.52	
Total			120	52	25	43	222	183	+39	43.33	—

== Honours ==
=== Player ===
PSV

- Eredivisie: 1999–2000, 2000–01
- Johan Cruyff Shield: 1998

Manchester United

- Premier League: 2002–03
- FA Cup: 2003–04
- Football League Cup: 2005–06; runner-up: 2002–03
- FA Community Shield: 2003

Real Madrid

- La Liga: 2006–07, 2007–08
- Supercopa de España: 2008

=== Manager ===
PSV

- KNVB Cup: 2022–23
- Johan Cruyff Shield: 2022

=== Individual ===
- Dutch Footballer of the Year: 1998–99, 1999–2000
- Eredivisie Top Goalscorer: 1998–99, 1999–2000
- Premier League Player of the Month: December 2001, February 2002, April 2003
- Sir Matt Busby Player of the Year: 2001–02, 2002–03
- ESM Team of the Year: 2001–02
- UEFA Champions League Top Goalscorer: 2001–02, 2002–03, 2004–05
- UEFA Champions League Top Assist Provider: 2001–02
- FA Cup Top Goalscorer: 2002–03, 2003–04
- PFA Fans' Player of the Year: 2001–02
- PFA Players' Player of the Year: 2001–02
- PFA Team of the Year: 2001–02 Premier League, 2003–04 Premier League
- IFFHS World's Top Goal Scorer of the Year: 2002
- BBC Goal of the Month: March 2003
- Premier League Player of the Season: 2002–03
- Premier League Golden Boot: 2002–03
- UEFA Club Forward of the Year: 2002–03
- UEFA Team of the Year: 2003
- FIFA 100
- UEFA Euro Team of the Tournament: 2004
- Pichichi Trophy: 2006–07
- ESPN World Team of the Decade: 2009
- IFFHS World's Top Goal Scorer of the Last Decade: 2012
