= 1999–2000 PSV Eindhoven season =

PSV Eindhoven
1999–2000 season
- Head coach: Eric Gerets
- Stadium: Philips Stadion
- Eredivisie: 1st
- KNVB Cup: Round of 16
- Champions League: Group stage
- Top goalscorer: League: Ruud van Nistelrooy (29); All: Ruud van Nistelrooy (32)
Home colours	Away colours

During the 1999–2000 Dutch football season, PSV Eindhoven competed in the Eredivisie.

== Season summary ==
PSV claimed the Eredivisie title with a margin of 16 points between them and second-placed Heerenveen, scoring 105 goals in the process.

== Kit ==
PSV's kit was manufactured by Nike and sponsored by Philips

== First-team squad ==
Squad at end of season

Note: Flags indicate national team as defined under FIFA eligibility rules; some limited exceptions apply. Players may hold more than one non-FIFA nationality.

No.	Pos.	Nation	Player
1	GK	(Federal Republic of Yugoslavia) YUG	Ivica Kralj
2	DF	(Netherlands) NED	André Ooijer
3	DF	(Netherlands) NED	Jürgen Dirkx
4	DF	(Netherlands) NED	Ernest Faber
5	DF	(Denmark) DEN	Jan Heintze
6	MF	(Netherlands) NED	Mark van Bommel
7	MF	(Russia) RUS	Dmitri Khokhlov
8	FW	(Netherlands) NED	Ruud van Nistelrooy
9	FW	(Netherlands) NED	Arnold Bruggink
10	FW	(Belgium) BEL	Luc Nilis (captain)
11	MF	(Finland) FIN	Joonas Kolkka
14	MF	(Switzerland) SUI	Johann Vogel
15	MF	(Netherlands) NED	Robert Fuchs
17	MF	(Netherlands) NED	Björn van der Doelen
18	DF	(Ghana) GHA	Eric Addo
19	MF	(Denmark) DEN	Dennis Rommedahl

No.	Pos.	Nation	Player
20	GK	(Netherlands) NED	Patrick Lodewijks
21	DF	(Russia) RUS	Yuriy Nikiforov
22	DF	(Netherlands) NED	Wilfred Bouma
23	GK	(Netherlands) NED	Ronald Waterreus
24	MF	(Romania) ROU	Ovidiu Stîngă
28	MF	(Poland) POL	Tomasz Iwan
30	DF	(Lithuania) LTU	Andrius Skerla
33	DF	(Netherlands) NED	Rob Wielaert
12	DF	(Netherlands) NED	Theo Lucius
16	DF	(Netherlands) NED	Chris van der Weerden
25	DF	(Netherlands) NED	Stan Valckx
34	DF	(Denmark) DEN	Kasper Bøgelund
13	MF	(Georgia (country)) GEO	Giorgi Gakhokidze
26	FW	(Netherlands) NED	Björn Becker
35	FW	(Netherlands) NED	Johan Pater
32	FW	(Brazil) BRA	Claudio

== Transfers ==
=== In ===
- (Switzerland) Johann Vogel - (Switzerland) Grasshoppers
- (Netherlands) Mark van Bommel - (Netherlands) Fortuna Sittard
- (Federal Republic of Yugoslavia) Ivica Kralj - (Portugal) Porto
- (Ghana) Eric Addo - (Belgium) Club Brugge, fl.5.9m

=== Out ===
- (Belgium) Gilles De Bilde - (England) Sheffield Wednesday, August

== Results ==
=== Champions League ===
==== Third qualifying round ====
- FC Zimbru Chișinău 0-0 PSV
- PSV 2-0 FC Zimbru Chișinău

==== Group stage ====
14 September 1999	Bayern Munich (Germany)	2–1	(Netherlands) PSV Eindhoven	Olympic Stadium, Munich
	Paulo Sérgio 11', 69'	Report	Khokhlov 59'	Attendance: 30,000; Referee: Gilles Veissière (France)

22 September 1999	PSV Eindhoven (Netherlands)	1–1	(Spain) Valencia	Philips Stadion, Eindhoven
	van Nistelrooy 72' (pen.)	Report	Claudio López 4'	Attendance: 26,500; Referee: Rune Pedersen (Norway)

29 September 1999	PSV Eindhoven (Netherlands)	0–1	(Scotland) Rangers	Philips Stadion, Eindhoven
		Report	Albertz 85'	Attendance: 28,000; Referee: Anders Frisk (Sweden

20 October 1999	Rangers (Scotland)	4–1	(Netherlands) PSV Eindhoven	Ibrox Stadium, Glasgow
	Amoruso 18'; Mols 39', 80'; N. McCann 56'	Report	van Nistelrooy 45' (pen.)	Attendance: 50,023; Referee: Pierluigi Collina (Italy)

26 October 1999	PSV Eindhoven (Netherlands)	2–1	(Germany) Bayern Munich	Philips Stadion, Eindhoven
	van Nistelrooy 39'; Nilis 57'	Report	Santa Cruz 51'	Attendance: 28,000; Referee: Paul Durkin (England

2 November 1999	Valencia (Spain)	1–0	(Netherlands) PSV Eindhoven	Estadio Mestalla, Valencia
	Claudio López 70'	Report		Attendance: 26,266; Referee: Graham Barber (England)
