= Mark van Bommel =

Dutch football player and manager (born 1977)

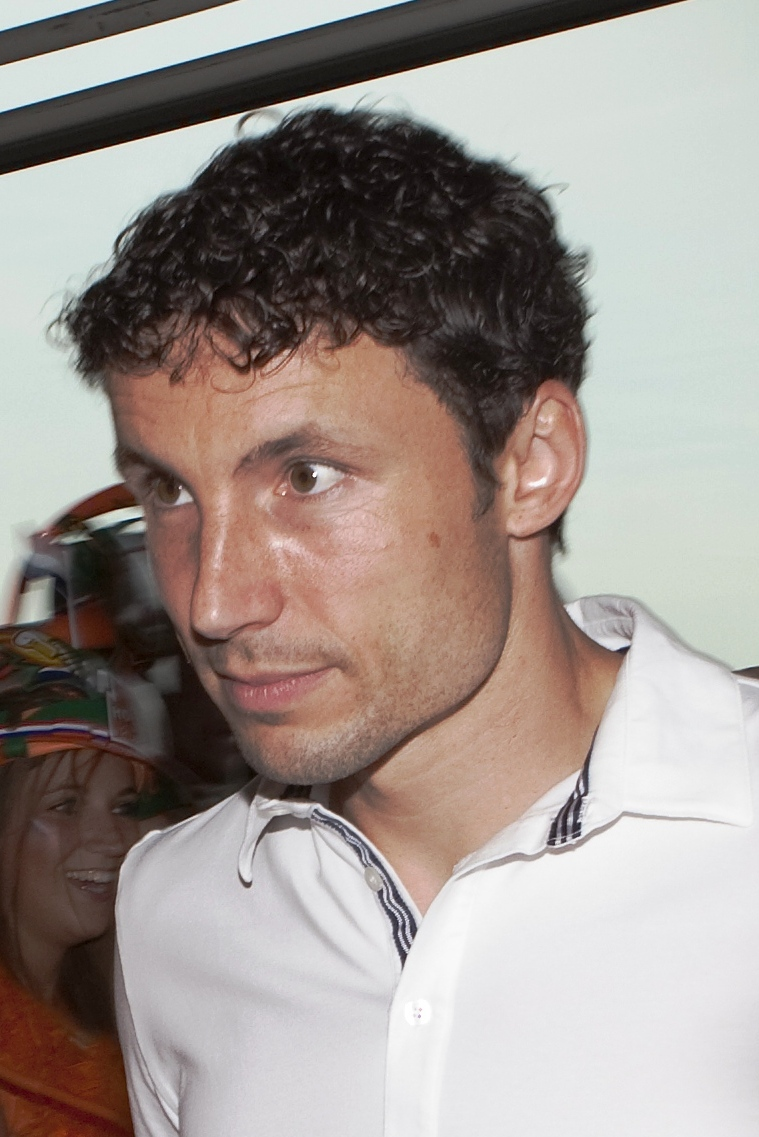
- Van Bommel in 2010

Personal information
- Full name: Mark Peter Gertruda Andreas van Bommel
- Date of birth: 22 April 1977 (age 49)
- Place of birth: Maasbracht, Netherlands
- Height: 1.87 m (6 ft 2 in)
- Position: Defensive midfielder

Team information
- Current team: Belgium (manager)

Youth career
- 1985–1992: RKVV Maasbracht

Senior career*
Years	Team	Apps	(Gls)
1992–1999	Fortuna Sittard	153	(13)
1999–2005	PSV	169	(46)
2005–2006	Barcelona	24	(2)
2006–2011	Bayern Munich	123	(11)
2011–2012	Milan	39	(0)
2012–2013	PSV	28	(6)
Total		536	(78)

International career
1996–2000	Netherlands U21	27	(3)
2000–2012	Netherlands	79	(10)

Managerial career
- 2018–2019: PSV
- 2021: VfL Wolfsburg
- 2022–2024: Antwerp
- 2026–: Belgium
Medal record
Men's football
Representing Netherlands
FIFA World Cup
Runner-up	2010 South Africa
- * Club domestic league appearances and goals

Mark Peter Gertruda Andreas van Bommel (born 22 April 1977) is a Dutch football coach and former player who played as a midfielder. He is currently the head coach of the Belgium national team. His FIFA World Cup profile describes him as "a tackling machine and expert ball-winner, but he also boasts a fine array of passes and a powerful shot, having been a free-kick specialist during his PSV days".

He played in and won the Dutch Eredivisie with PSV, Spanish La Liga with Barcelona, German Bundesliga with Bayern Munich, and Italian Serie A with Milan. Between 2000 and 2011, he won eight national championship titles in four competitions: four with PSV, two with Bayern, one with Barcelona and one with Milan. Van Bommel won the 2005–06 UEFA Champions League with Barcelona and was Bayern's first foreign captain. At Bayern, he led the team to two Bundesliga titles, and finished runner-up in the 2010 UEFA Champions League Final.

From 2000 to 2012, Van Bommel was part of the Netherlands team and earned 79 caps. He was part of the teams that went to the 2006 FIFA World Cup, finished runner-up at the 2010 FIFA World Cup, and went to UEFA Euro 2012.

He began managing as a youth coach and assistant to his father-in-law and former international manager Bert van Marwijk. He then managed in his own right at PSV, VfL Wolfsburg and Royal Antwerp, winning the Belgian Pro League and Belgian Cup double with the latter in 2022–23.

== Club career ==
Van Bommel started his amateur career at local club RKVV Maasbracht before earning a professional contract with Fortuna Sittard in 1992. His colleagues at Fortuna who would later join PSV alongside him were Wilfred Bouma and Kevin Hofland.

=== PSV ===
Van Bommel was signed by PSV in 1999 where he formed a midfield partnership with Swiss international Johann Vogel. Van Bommel won four Eredivisie titles and two Johan Cruyff Shields with the club. He was also named Dutch Footballer of the Year in 2001 and 2005.

In his final season with PSV, having assisted the team to the Dutch league title and a Champions League semi-final place, Van Bommel was expected to join his father-in-law Bert van Marwijk who at the time managed the Bundesliga side Borussia Dortmund, but Van Bommel opted to stay at PSV until the end of the 2004–05 season.

After the club's UEFA Champions League semi-final loss to Milan and with the Eredivisie title in PSV's hands at the end of April, he confirmed he would join Barcelona in May 2005 after the club won its own domestic league.

=== Barcelona ===
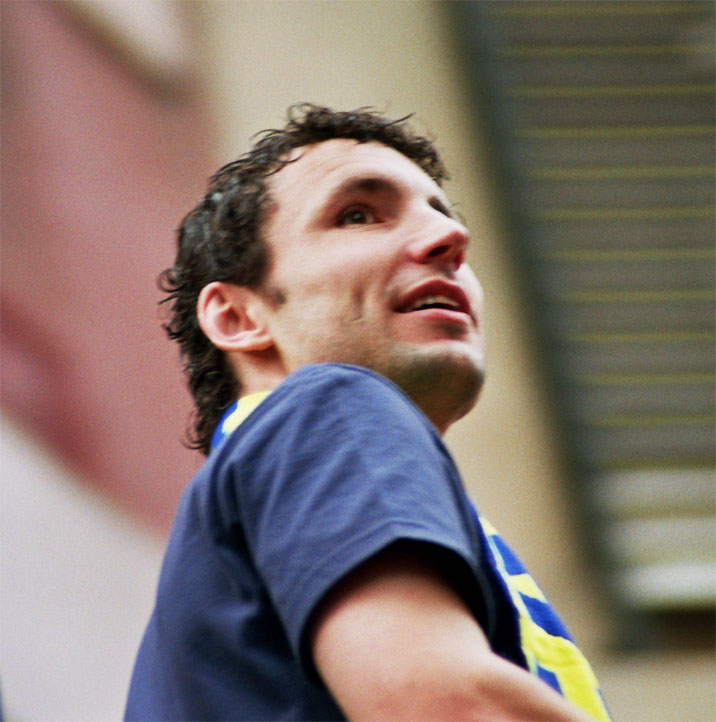
Van Bommel with Barcelona

Seeking to strengthen his already title-winning squad, Frank Rijkaard signed Van Bommel on a free transfer for Barcelona. Van Bommel spent the summer prior to his move to Spain learning the Spanish language in a convent in Eindhoven. Similar to his role at PSV where he was largely used as a holding midfielder, utilising his ball-winning skills to complement the more skillful players already at the club. As per his squad role, throughout the league campaign he was rotated with fellow midfielders Xavi, Edmílson, Andrés Iniesta, Deco and Thiago Motta, featuring in 24 domestic matches and a further 12 in cup competitions. His only season with Barcelona was largely successful as the club won La Liga and the 2005–06 Champions League. He won his third trophy with the club on 20 August 2006 as Barça beat city rivals Espanyol in the 2006 Supercopa de España. Six days later, however, it was announced that Van Bommel had joined Bayern Munich.

=== Bayern Munich ===
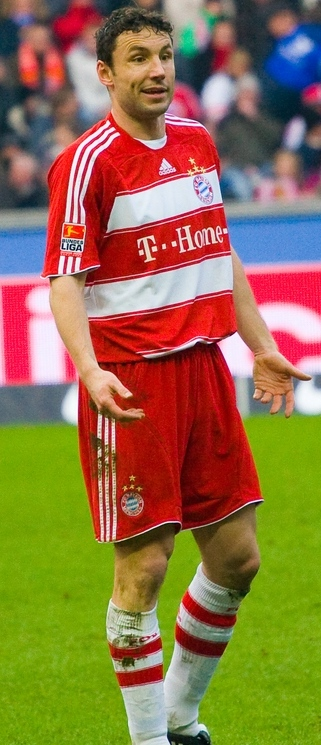
Mark van Bommel with Bayern Munich in 2009

On 26 August 2006, Bayern Munich team manager Uli Hoeneß announced Van Bommel would be joining the Bundesliga club. Media reports speculated that the move was influenced by the ongoing Owen Hargreaves transfer saga, but Hoeneß insisted the club intended to go forward with both players. Bayern Munich paid 6 million euro to Barcelona in the deal.

Soon after joining the Bavarian side, Van Bommel proved to be a key player for them, providing strength in the middle of the pitch. Due to his terrific performances during his first season at Bayern, he was voted the Bayern Player of the Year for 2006–07, beating out longtime fan-favorites Roy Makaay and Mehmet Scholl. In the 2007–08 season, he won his first silverware with club as Bayern claimed a double of the Bundesliga title and DFB-Pokal.

After Oliver Kahn retired in 2008, Van Bommel was selected as captain, becoming the club's first ever non-German captain.

Under the management of compatriot Louis van Gaal, Van Bommel led Bayern to the second league and cup double of his time at the club during the 2009–10 season. The team also reached the 2010 UEFA Champions League Final, but a defeat by Internazionale denied Bayern its first ever treble. He played 123 matches in the German top-flight.

=== Milan ===
On 25 January 2011, Van Bommel signed a six-month contract with Milan on a free transfer after terminating his contract with Bayern. He was given the number four shirt, and the day after, he made his debut in a 2–1 victory against Sampdoria in the Coppa Italia quarter-final. On 29 January 2011, Van Bommel made his Serie A debut against Catania but was sent off after receiving a second yellow card early in the second half. Soon after, however, he adapted to Italian football and became a regular in Massimiliano Allegri's squad, contributing greatly in convincing 3–0 wins against Napoli and city rivals Internazionale. He was a starter in the match against Roma on 7 May 2011 that brought Milan their 18th Scudetto.

On 17 May 2011, Milan announced that Van Bommel had extended his contract for one more year. In the second season of his stint at Milan, he continued to be a starter and occupied the defensive midfielder position throughout the season. He decided not to stay with Milan for another season, despite being offered a new contract.

=== Return to PSV ===
On 29 April 2012, Van Bommel announced that he would sign a contract with PSV, who confirmed the signing on 14 May. After a disappointing season in which PSV finished second in the Eredivisie and lost the KNVB Cup final to AZ, Van Bommel announced his retirement from professional football on 12 May 2013. In an interview after his last professional game (against Twente in a 3–1 loss during which he was sent off after receiving two yellow cards), Van Bommel expressed an interest in a coaching career. He cited his desire to make way for younger players to shine and rest his body, specifically his injured left knee.

== International career ==
Van Bommel's debut for the Netherlands was a 4–0 on 7 October 2000 against Cyprus. However, he did not make an appearance in a major tournament until 2006, with the Netherlands failing to qualify for the 2002 FIFA World Cup and injury preventing him from playing during UEFA Euro 2004 in Portugal.

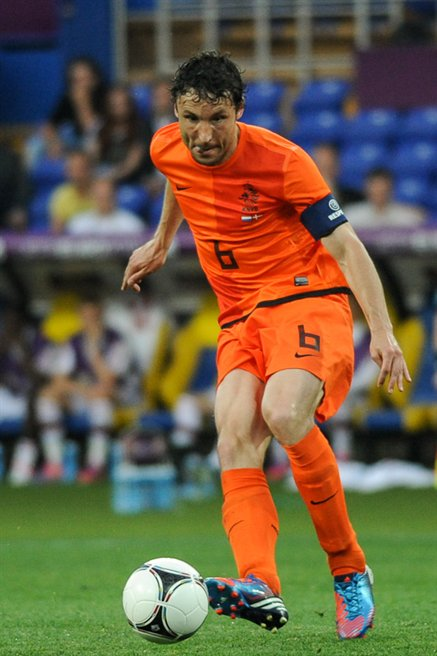
Van Bommel playing for the Netherlands at the UEFA Euro 2012

National team manager Marco van Basten was dissatisfied with Van Bommel's defensive performance in the 2006 FIFA World Cup qualification match against Romania and he was subsequently not selected for the rest of the qualification series. With many Dutch football observers believing Van Bommel's international career to be over, he was selected back into the Dutch side for the 2006 FIFA World Cup.

At the 2006 World Cup, Van Bommel played in three of the games for his country (all except the match against Argentina, where both teams had already sealed their passage to the knockout stage of the tournament). He was substituted twice in these three matches. His position in the team was as right-half. His duties were mainly to play the anchor role in the Dutch three-man midfield in their usual 4–3–3 formation.

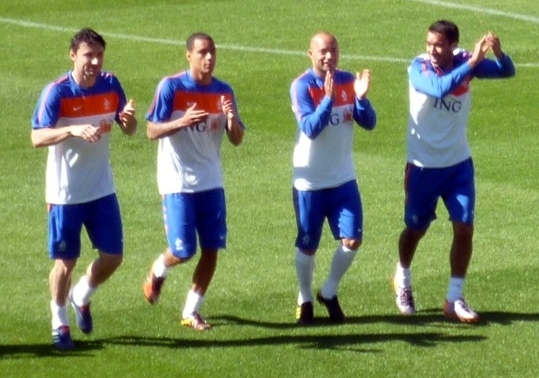
Mark van Bommel (left) with (from left to right) Gregory van der Wiel, Demy de Zeeuw and Giovanni van Bronckhorst

A notoriously hard-tackling competitor, he was the first of many players booked in the second-round defeat against Portugal, dubbed "The Battle of Nuremberg" by the press. After the World Cup, Van Bommel was not called up for the Euro 2008 qualifiers against Luxembourg and Belarus. In September 2006, after his move to Bayern Munich, he was added to Van Basten's squad to face Bulgaria; however, Van Bommel stated (alongside Ruud van Nistelrooy) he would not play for Oranje as long as Van Basten was in charge. After Van Basten left to manage Ajax, new Netherlands head coach (and father-in-law) Bert van Marwijk recalled Van Bommel, which led to his return in the Dutch national team. Van Bommel was part of the starting line-up in the Dutch team for the 2010 World Cup, managed by Van Marwijk.

Van Bommel was selected by Van Marwijk to succeed Giovanni van Bronckhorst as the new captain of the Netherlands, despite initial claims he did not want to be the new captain, having been absent from the national team for two years. He captained the side for the first time in a 5–0 away win against San Marino. Against San Marino, Van Bommel captained the Netherlands to a record-breaking 11–0 victory in Eindhoven on 2 September 2011.

Following the Netherlands' elimination from the Euro 2012, Van Bommel retired from international football. He scored ten goals in his 79 international appearances.

== Managerial career ==
=== Early years ===
Van Bommel started his coaching career as an assistant manager in January 2014, joining the Netherlands U17 national team under Maarten Stekelenburg. On 1 September 2015, he joined his father-in-law Bert van Marwijk at the Saudi Arabia national team, serving as assistant there for two years. On 25 April 2017, he was appointed head coach of the PSV youth (U19) team. On 23 March 2018, he reunited with van Marwijk at the Australia national team, assisting him at the 2018 FIFA World Cup.

=== PSV Eindhoven ===
On 22 June 2018, Eredivisie champions PSV Eindhoven announced Van Bommel as manager on a three-year deal. He replaced Phillip Cocu, who had left for Fenerbahçe.

He made his senior managerial debut in the 2018 Johan Cruyff Shield against Feyenoord on 4 August, losing on penalties after a goalless draw. A week later in his first Eredivisie game, PSV won 4–0 at home to Utrecht. After 14 consecutive victories at the start of the season, his side lost 2–1 at Feyenoord.

On 16 December 2019, Van Bommel was sacked by PSV with the team in fourth, following a loss to Feyenoord.

=== VfL Wolfsburg ===
On 2 June 2021, VfL Wolfsburg unveiled Van Bommel as the club's new head coach, replacing the departing Oliver Glasner on a two-year contract. On his debut in the DFB-Pokal first round on 8 August, he used six substitutes instead of the permitted five in a 3–1 extra-time win over SC Preußen Münster, resulting in disqualification. Six days later, he won 1–0 at home in his first Bundesliga game, against VfL Bochum; the goal came from compatriot Wout Weghorst. Four consecutive wins meant that Wolfsburg topped the table in September, but a run of form including eight winless games in all competitions resulted in his dismissal on 24 October.

=== Royal Antwerp ===
On 26 May 2022, Royal Antwerp appointed Van Bommel as the club's manager on a two-year contract. He was signed by their sporting director, his former international teammate Marc Overmars. He won the Belgian Cup in his first season, defeating local rivals K.V. Mechelen 2–0 in the final. He also won the Belgian Pro League, securing the title on the final day with a 2–2 draw at Genk via an equaliser from Toby Alderweireld in the fourth minute of added time; it was the club's first league championship in 66 years.

Van Bommel led Antwerp to a second consecutive cup final, losing by a single goal to Union SG on 9 May 2024. He defended his record by saying that he was not managing Chelsea or Real Madrid, and that his team had dealt with financial problems and the January sale of Arthur Vermeeren. He left in June 2024 at the end of his contract and was replaced by Jonas De Roeck.

=== Belgium ===
On 24 July 2026, van Bommel was named as the head coach of the Belgian national team, succeeding Rudi Garcia.

== Personal life ==
Van Bommel is married to Andra, daughter of Bert van Marwijk, with whom he has three children: Thomas, Ruben and Renée.

In October 2022, as manager of Royal Antwerp, Van Bommel was threatened in his car by a man armed with a gun. The attacker was demanding a professional contract. He was sentenced to five years in prison.

== Career statistics ==
=== Club ===
Club	Season	League			National cup (Note: Includes KNVB Cup, Copa del Rey, DFB-Pokal, Coppa Italia)		Europe		Other		Total	
Club	Season	Division	Apps	Goals	Apps	Goals	Apps	Goals	Apps	Goals	Apps	Goals
Fortuna Sittard	1992–93	Eredivisie	1	0		0	0	0	–		1	0
Fortuna Sittard	1993–94	Eerste Divisie	13	0		0	0	0	–		13	0
Fortuna Sittard	1994–95	Eerste Divisie	31	7		1	0	0	–		31	8
Fortuna Sittard	1995–96	Eredivisie	27	0		0	0	0	–		27	0
Fortuna Sittard	1996–97	Eredivisie	19	0		0	0	0	–		19	0
Fortuna Sittard	1997–98	Eredivisie	31	1		0	0	0	–		31	1
Fortuna Sittard	1998–99	Eredivisie	31	5		2	4 (Note: Appearances in UEFA Intertoto Cup)	0	–		35	7
Fortuna Sittard	Total		153	13		3	4	0	–		157	16
PSV	1999–2000	Eredivisie	33	6	1	0	4 (Note: Appearances in UEFA Champions League)	0	–		38	6
PSV	2000–01	Eredivisie	32	7	4	0	11	2	1 (Note: Appearance in Johan Cruyff Shield)	0	48	9
PSV	2001–02	Eredivisie	23	4	3	0	7	2	1	0	34	6
PSV	2002–03	Eredivisie	28	9	3	0	6	0	1	0	38	9
PSV	2003–04	Eredivisie	23	6	1	0	8	1	1	1	33	8
PSV	2004–05	Eredivisie	30	14	3	1	14	2	–		47	17
PSV	Total		169	46	15	1	50	7	4	1	238	55
Barcelona	2005–06	La Liga	24	2	4	1	9	1	1 (Note: Appearance in Supercopa de España)	0	38	4
Bayern Munich	2006–07	Bundesliga	29	6	3	1	8	1	0	0	40	8
Bayern Munich	2007–08	Bundesliga	27	2	6	0	13 (Note: Appearances in UEFA Cup)	1	2 (Note: Appearances in DFL-Ligapokal)	0	48	3
Bayern Munich	2008–09	Bundesliga	29	2	3	0	9	1	–		41	3
Bayern Munich	2009–10	Bundesliga	25	1	4	0	9	1	–		38	2
Bayern Munich	2010–11	Bundesliga	13	0	2	0	3	0	0	0	18	0
Bayern Munich	Total		123	11	18	1	42	4	2	0	185	16
Milan	2010–11	Serie A	14	0	2	0	0	0	–		16	0
Milan	2011–12	Serie A	25	0	2	0	6	0	1 (Note: Appearance in Supercoppa Italiana)	0	34	0
Milan	Total		39	0	4	0	6	0	1	0	50	0
PSV	2012–13	Eredivisie	28	6	3	1	3 (Note: Appearances in UEFA Europa League)	1	1	0	35	8
Career total			536	78	44	7	114	13	9	1	703	99

=== International ===
Netherlands
Year	Apps	Goals
2000	3	0
2001	7	4
2002	5	0
2003	7	1
2004	8	2
2005	4	0
2006	6	0
2007	0	0
2008	6	1
2009	7	1
2010	14	1
2011	6	0
2012	6	0
Total	79	10

Mark van Bommel: International goals
No.	Date	Venue	Opponent	Score	Result	Competition
1	14 March 2001	Mini Estadi, Barcelona, Spain	Andorra	5–0	5–0	2002 FIFA World Cup qualification
2	15 August 2001	White Hart Lane, London, England	England	1–0	2–0	Friendly
3	5 September 2001	Philips Stadion, Eindhoven, Netherlands	Estonia	2–0	5–0	2002 FIFA World Cup qualification
4	5 September 2001	Philips Stadion, Eindhoven, Netherlands	Estonia	4–0	5–0	2002 FIFA World Cup qualification
5	2 April 2003	Sheriff Stadium, Tiraspol, Moldova	Moldova	2–1	2–1	UEFA Euro 2004 qualifying
6	18 August 2004	Råsunda Stadium, Solna, Sweden	Sweden	2–1	2–2	Friendly
7	3 September 2004	Galgenwaard Stadium, Utrecht, Netherlands	Liechtenstein	1–0	3–0	Friendly
8	15 October 2008	Ullevaal Stadion, Oslo, Norway	Norway	1–0	1–0	2010 FIFA World Cup qualification
9	6 June 2009	Laugardalsvöllur, Reykjavík, Iceland	Iceland	2–0	2–1	2010 FIFA World Cup qualification
10	5 June 2010	Amsterdam Arena, Amsterdam, Netherlands	Hungary	4–1	6–1	Friendly

== Managerial statistics ==
As of match played 15 November 2026

Managerial record by team and tenure
Team	From	To	Record								Ref.
Team	From	To	G	W	D	L	GF	GA	GD	Win %	Ref.
PSV Eindhoven	22 June 2018	16 December 2019	75	44	15	16	175	84	+91	58.67	
VfL Wolfsburg	1 July 2021	24 October 2021	13	4	3	6	11	18	−7	30.77	
Royal Antwerp	26 May 2022	26 May 2024	107	55	23	29	178	113	+65	51.40	
Belgium	24 July 2026	Present	6	4	0	2	12	7	+5	66.67	
Total			201	107	41	53	376	222	+154	53.23	

== Honours ==
=== Player ===
Fortuna Sittard

- Eerste Divisie: 1994–95

PSV Eindhoven

- Eredivisie: 1999–2000, 2000–01, 2002–03, 2004–05
- KNVB Cup: 2004–05
- Johan Cruyff Shield: 2000, 2001, 2003, 2012

Barcelona

- La Liga: 2005–06
- Supercopa de España: 2005
- UEFA Champions League: 2005–06

Bayern Munich

- Bundesliga: 2007–08, 2009–10
- DFB-Pokal: 2007–08, 2009–10
- UEFA Champions League runner-up: 2009–10

Milan

- Serie A: 2010–11
- Supercoppa Italiana: 2011

Netherlands

- FIFA World Cup runner-up: 2010

Individual

- FIFA World Cup All-Star Team: 2010
- Dutch Football Talent of the Year: 1999
- Dutch Footballer of the Year: 2001, 2005
- Dutch Football Golden Boot: 2005
- ESM Team of the Year: 2004–05

=== Manager ===
Royal Antwerp

- Belgian Pro League: 2022–23
- Belgian Cup: 2022–23
- Belgian Super Cup: 2023

Individual

- Belgian Professional Manager of the Season: 2022–23
- Belgian Golden Shoe - Coach of the year: 2023
