= Willem van Hanegem =

Dutch former footballer and manager

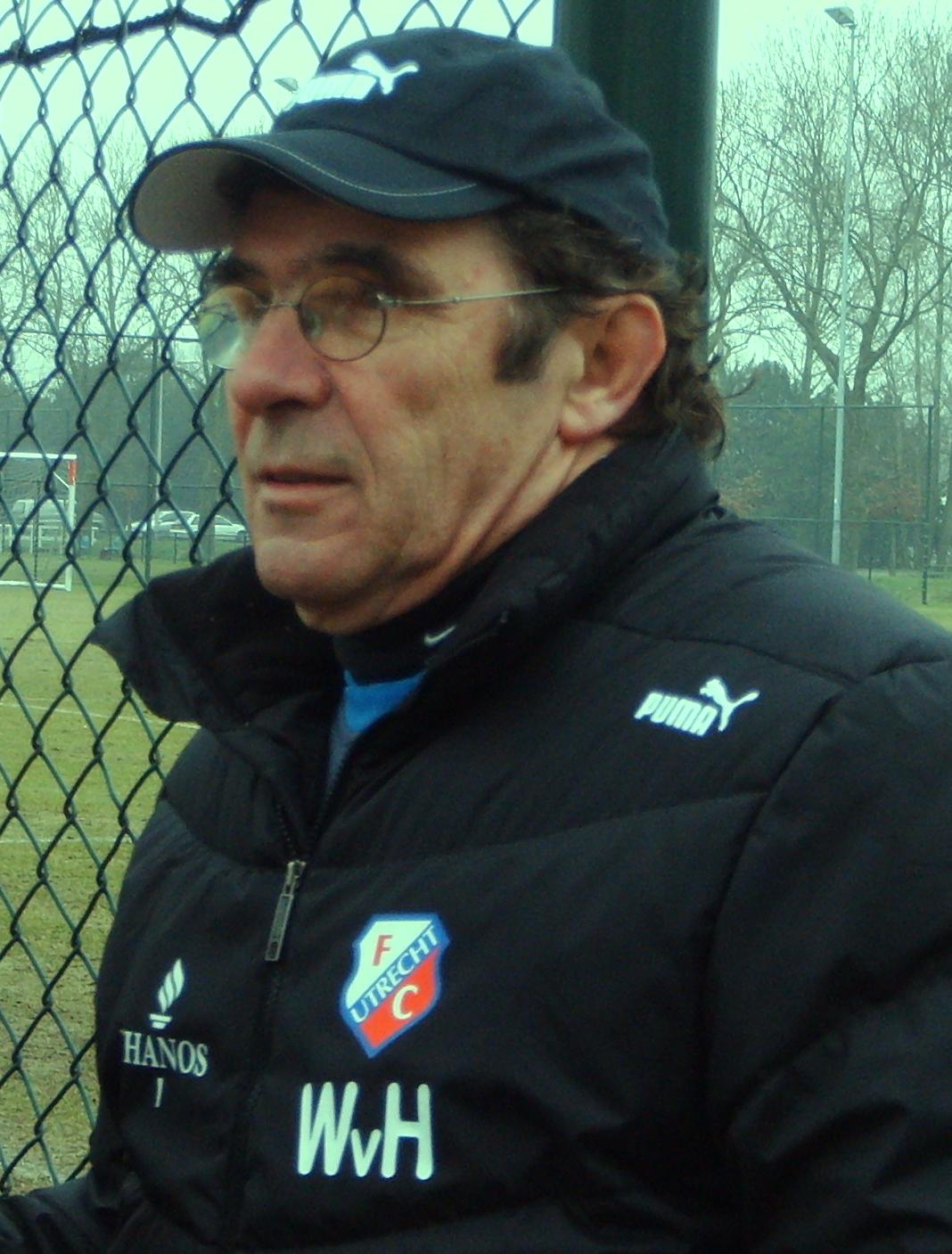
- Van Hanegem in 2008

Personal information
- Date of birth: 20 February 1944 (age 82)
- Place of birth: Breskens, Netherlands
- Height: 1.85 m (6 ft 1 in)
- Position: Midfielder

Youth career
- Velox SC

Senior career*
Years	Team	Apps	(Gls)
1962–1966	Velox	109	(39)
1966–1968	Xerxes	67	(32)
1968–1976	Feyenoord	247	(79)
1976–1979	AZ '67	75	(10)
1979	Chicago Sting	27	(6)
1979–1981	Utrecht	54	(3)
1981–1983	Feyenoord	51	(2)
Total		630	(179)

International career
1968–1979	Netherlands	52	(6)

Managerial career
- 1990–1992: Holland
- 1990–1991: Wageningen (assistant)
- 1992–1995: Feyenoord
- 1995–1996: Al Hilal
- 1997–1999: AZ
- 2001: Sparta
- 2007–2008: Utrecht
Medal record
Men's football
Representing Netherlands
FIFA World Cup
Runner-up	1974 West Germany
European Championship
Third place	1976 Yugoslavia
- * Club domestic league appearances and goals

Willem "Wim" van Hanegem (Dutch pronunciation: [ˈʋɪləɱ ˈʋɪɱ vɑn ˈɦaːnəɣɛm]; born 20 February 1944) is a Dutch former football player and coach who played as a midfielder. In a playing career spanning over 20 years, he won several domestic honours in the Netherlands, as well as both the European Cup and UEFA Cup with Feyenoord. He was also part of the Dutch national team that were runners-up in the 1974 FIFA World Cup.

Widely considered one of the greatest Dutch footballers in history, he earned the nickname 'De Kromme' ('The Crooked One' or 'The Bent One'), initially due to his posture as a consequence of bow legs and later because of his trademark bent passes and contrarian commentary. Known for his aggressiveness, intelligence and technical playmaking abilities, Van Hanegem was often praised by contemporaries like Johan Cruyff. For his significant contributions to the club's rise to domestic and European success, Feyenoord honored Van Hanegem in 2014 by naming one of its stadium's stands after him.

As a manager, he won the league and cup with Feyenoord and spent a period as the Dutch national team's assistant coach. His most recent job as manager was for FC Utrecht, from 2007 to 2008. He writes a regular column about football for Algemeen Dagblad, one of the Netherlands' principal daily newspapers.

== Early life ==
Van Hanegem was born on 20 February 1944 in Breskens, Zeeland, the son of Lo van Hanegem (1905-1944) and Anna van Grol. During an Allied bombing raid on Breskens on 11 September 1944, his father Lo, brother Isaac and his sister were killed. Whilst losing his own life during the bombing, father Lo saved the life of a baby by covering him with his body; the baby became a professor in hematology later in life and befriended Willem van Hanegem after the story of Willem's father became public in 1992. After the war, Willem moved to Utrecht with his mother.

During a training session of Velox, he stood on the sidelines and every ball that went wide of the goal, he shot back so accurately that coach Daan van Beek asked him to come and play for the club. Six months later, he played in the club's senior team.

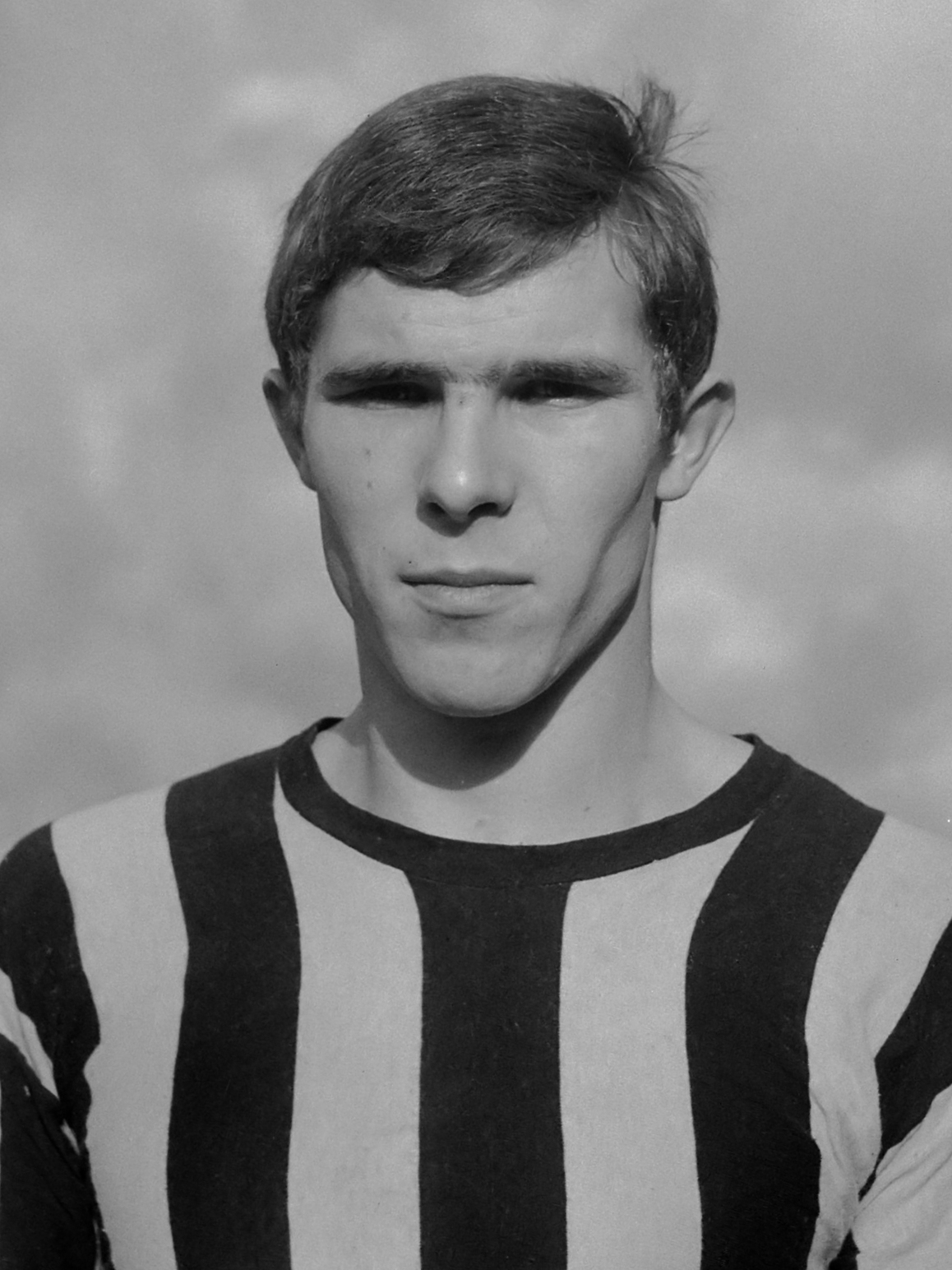
Van Hanegem with Velox in 1964

== Club career ==
Van Hanegem spent six years at Velox in the Eerste Divisie, playing 109 games and scoring 39 goals. After six years with Velox, Van Hanegem moved from Utrecht to Rotterdam, where he played for Xerxes, which had just won promotion at the Eredivisie. In the 1967-68 season, Van Hanegem was the second best top scorer in the Eredivisie (behind his later teammate Ove Kindvall, scoring 26 goals.

Ajax was interested in Van Hanegem's services, but coach Rinus Michels refused to buy the player, believing that he was not suited for "modern football" due to his lack of pace and "one-dimensional" playing style. Van Hanegem would instead sign for Ajax's rivals Feyenoord, where he would enjoy his greatest successes, and play alongside players such as Wim Jansen, Franz Hasil, Coen Moulijn, Ove Kindvall, Ruud Geels, Theo Laseroms, Rinus Israël, Theo de Jong, Johan Boskamp and Wim Rijsbergen. He also established a father-son relationship with club coach Ernst Happel. With Van Hanegem's playmaking skills, Feyenoord won three Eredivisie titles, a KNVB Cup, a European Cup, an International Cup, and a UEFA Cup.

Van Hanegem left Feyenoord in 1976 to join AZ '67, where he played for three seasons alongside striker Kees Kist and midfielders Peter Arntz and Jan Peters, winning the KNVB Cup in 1978. He had a brief stint with Chicago Sting in 1979, where he played together with and befriended Dick Advocaat, until he returned to the Netherlands the same year to play for FC Utrecht (a merger of clubs VV DOS, USV Elinkwijk and Velox, the club that he played for in his younger years).

Van Hanegem returned to Feyenoord in 1981, playing for two seasons. On 4 June 1983, upon his retirement of professional football, Feyenoord offers Van Hanegem a goodbye match between Feyenoord and the Dutch team that made the World Cup final of 1974; the match ends in a 2-2 draw, with Van Hanegem scoring once for the reunited Dutch team.

== International career ==
Van Hanegem played 52 times for the Dutch national team, scoring six goals in total. At the 1974 World Cup, he formed a formidable midfield with fellow Feyenoord teammate Wim Jansen and Ajax midfielder Johan Neeskens; English football writer and novelist Brian Glanville named him his player of the 1974 World Cup. He also played in the UEFA Euro 1976, winning a bronze medal. He was initially selected to play for the Netherlands in the 1978 FIFA World Cup, but after his AZ teammate Hugo Hovenkamp suffered a knee injury, Van Hanegem declined to go. He last played for the national team in 1979.

== Style of play ==
Van Hanegem has one advantage over me. When I have a bad game, I’m useless. When Van Hanegem has a bad game, he rolls up his sleeves and starts tackling.

— Johan Cruyff

Willem is a player who can make the game, break the game, can play fast, can play slow. For me, he's a perfect player.

— Ernst Happel

Van Hanegem is widely considered one of the greatest Dutch players of all time, and by some as one of the finest midfielders in football history. Capable of playing as an attacking, central and defensive midfielder, Van Hanegem was renowned for his tactical insight and was well known for his fantastic passing range and his ability with the ball at his feet. Both his way of sprinting (he had bandy legs), and his skill to give the ball a curve (achieved by striking the ball with the outside of his left foot) gave him the nickname De Kromme (The Crooked). Whilst being known for being a playmaker, he was capable of scoring goals (being the second top scorer in the 1967-68 season of the Eredivisie) and also excel in defensive duties such as breaking up plays through tackles. In some occasions, Van Hanegem played as a sweeper whenever his fellow Feyenoord teammate Rinus Israël was injured, and would later play the same role in his last years at Feyenoord. Van Hanegem was also known for his leadership skills, workrate and tenacity. His primary weakness was his lack of pace.

== Managerial career ==
After retiring as a player, Van Hanegem joined Feyenoord as assistant to manager Thijs Libregts in 1983 and stayed in the post until 1986. He then joined FC Utrecht as assistant, first to Nol de Ruiter and later Han Berger, leaving in 1988, before moving to FC Wageningen. He returned to Feyenoord as manager in 1992, winning the league in 1993 and the Dutch Cup in 1994 and 1995.

In 1995, he had a spell as manager with Saudi Arabian club Al-Hilal, then took the post at AZ'67 in 1997. He joined Sparta Rotterdam in 2001. His stay was short-lived, and in 2002 he became assistant to manager Dick Advocaat of the Dutch national side; he left together with Advocaat after UEFA Euro 2004. He was appointed manager of FC Utrecht in July 2007 and was fired on 23 December 2008.

== Personal life ==
Van Hanegem was known for rough, passionate play against German sides (before the 1974 final, he exhorted the Dutch side to "stuff the Germans"). "I don't like Germans. Everytime I played against German players, I had a problem because of the war." His hatred was summed up after the 1974 final, "The important thing was to beat the Germans by any score, as long as we humiliated them. They murdered my father, sister and two brothers. I am full of angst. I hate them." After the game (with Germany winning 2–1) Van Hanegem was the only Dutch player that left the field in tears. In later years, however, Van Hanegem used a more conciliatory tone, when commenting on the war.

He married Truus de Nijs in 1963 and divorced her in 1983. The couple had two children named Alies and Gert. His son Gert van Hanegem played football professionally at FC Utrecht, appearing in 29 league matches during the 1989-90 Eredivisie season.

Van Hanegem later marries Marianna Beun and has also two kids with her, named Willem Jr. and Boy. Willem's first son from his second marriage, Willem Jr., is an international electronic dance music artist and DJ. Together with Ward van der Harst, he forms the DJ/producer duo W&W.

Van Hanegem was diagnosed with prostate cancer in January 2018, but recovered in March of the same year. He received the Order of Orange-Nassau in 2024.

== Career statistics ==
=== Club ===
Appearances and goals by club, season and competition
Club	Season	League			National cup		Continental		Other		Total	
Club	Season	Division	Apps	Goals	Apps	Goals	Apps	Goals	Apps	Goals	Apps	Goals
Velox	1962-63	Eerste Divisie	24	7	—		—		—		24	7
Velox	1963-64	Eerste Divisie	29	13	2	2	—		—		31	15
Velox	1964-65	Eerste Divisie	30	11	3	1	—		—		33	12
Velox	1965-66	Eerste Divisie	26	8	1	0	—		—		27	8
Velox	Total		109	39	6	3	0	0	0	0	115	42
Xerxes	1966-67	Eredivisie	34	6	2	0	—		—		36	6
Xerxes	1967-68	Eredivisie	33	26	1	0	—		—		34	26
Xerxes	Total		67	32	3	0	0	0	0	0	70	32
Feyenoord	1968-69	Eredivisie	32	14	5	3	2 (Note: Appearances in UEFA Cup)	0	—		39	17
Feyenoord	1969-70	Eredivisie	32	6	1	0	8 (Note: Appearances in European Cup)	4	—		41	10
Feyenoord	1970-71	Eredivisie	34	13	4	1	2	0	2 (Note: Two appearances in Intercontinental Cup)	0	42	14
Feyenoord	1971-72	Eredivisie	29	6	1	0	6	4	—		36	10
Feyenoord	1972-73	Eredivisie	30	12	2	1	4	4	—		36	17
Feyenoord	1973-74	Eredivisie	34	12	3	0	10	4	—		47	16
Feyenoord	1974-75	Eredivisie	29	11	1	0	3	2	—		33	13
Feyenoord	1975-76	Eredivisie	27	5	2	1	1	0	—		30	6
Feyenoord	Total		247	79	19	6	36	18	2	0	304	103
AZ '67	1976-77	Eredivisie	30	6	4	1	—		—		34	7
AZ '67	1977-78	Eredivisie	30	1	4	0	3	2	—		37	3
AZ '67	1978-79	Eredivisie	15	3	4	0	2 (Note: Appearances in UEFA Cup Winners' Cup)	0	—		21	3
AZ '67	Total		75	10	12	1	5	2	0	0	92	13
Chicago Sting	1979	NASL	27	6	—		—		—		27	6
Utrecht	1979-80	Eredivisie	27	1	1	0	—		—		28	1
Utrecht	1980-81	Eredivisie	27	2	2	0	2	0	—		31	2
Utrecht	Total		54	3	3	0	2	0	0	0	59	3
Feyenoord	1981-82	Eredivisie	24	1	1	0	5	0	—		30	1
Feyenoord	1982-83	Eredivisie	27	1	2	0	—		—		29	1
Feyenoord	Total		51	2	3	0	5	0	0	0	59	2
Career total			630	171	46	10	48	20	2	0	726	201

=== International ===
Appearances and goals by national team and year
National team	Year	Apps	Goals
Netherlands	1968	4	1
Netherlands	1969	4	0
Netherlands	1970	4	0
Netherlands	1971	4	0
Netherlands	1972	5	1
Netherlands	1973	5	2
Netherlands	1974	14	0
Netherlands	1975	4	1
Netherlands	1976	2	0
Netherlands	1977	3	1
Netherlands	1978	2	0
Netherlands	1979	1	0
Total		52	6

Scores and results list the Netherlands' goal tally first, score column indicates score after each Van Hanegem goal.

List of international goals scored by Willem van Hanegem
No.	Date	Venue	Opponent	Score	Result	Competition
1	4 September 1968	De Kuip, Rotterdam, Netherlands	Luxembourg	2–0	2–0	1970 FIFA World Cup qualification
2	3 May 1972	De Kuip, Rotterdam, Netherlands	Peru	2–0	3–0	Friendly
3	22 August 1973	De Kuip, Rotterdam, Netherlands	Iceland	1–0	5–0	1974 FIFA World Cup qualification
4	29 August 1973	De Adelaarshorst, Deventer, Netherlands	Iceland	7–1	8–1	1974 FIFA World Cup qualification
5	17 May 1975	Waldstadion, Frankfurt, Germany	West Germany	1–1	1–1	Friendly
6	31 August 1977	Goffertstadion, Nijmegen, Netherlands	Iceland	1–0	4–1	1978 FIFA World Cup qualification

== Honours ==
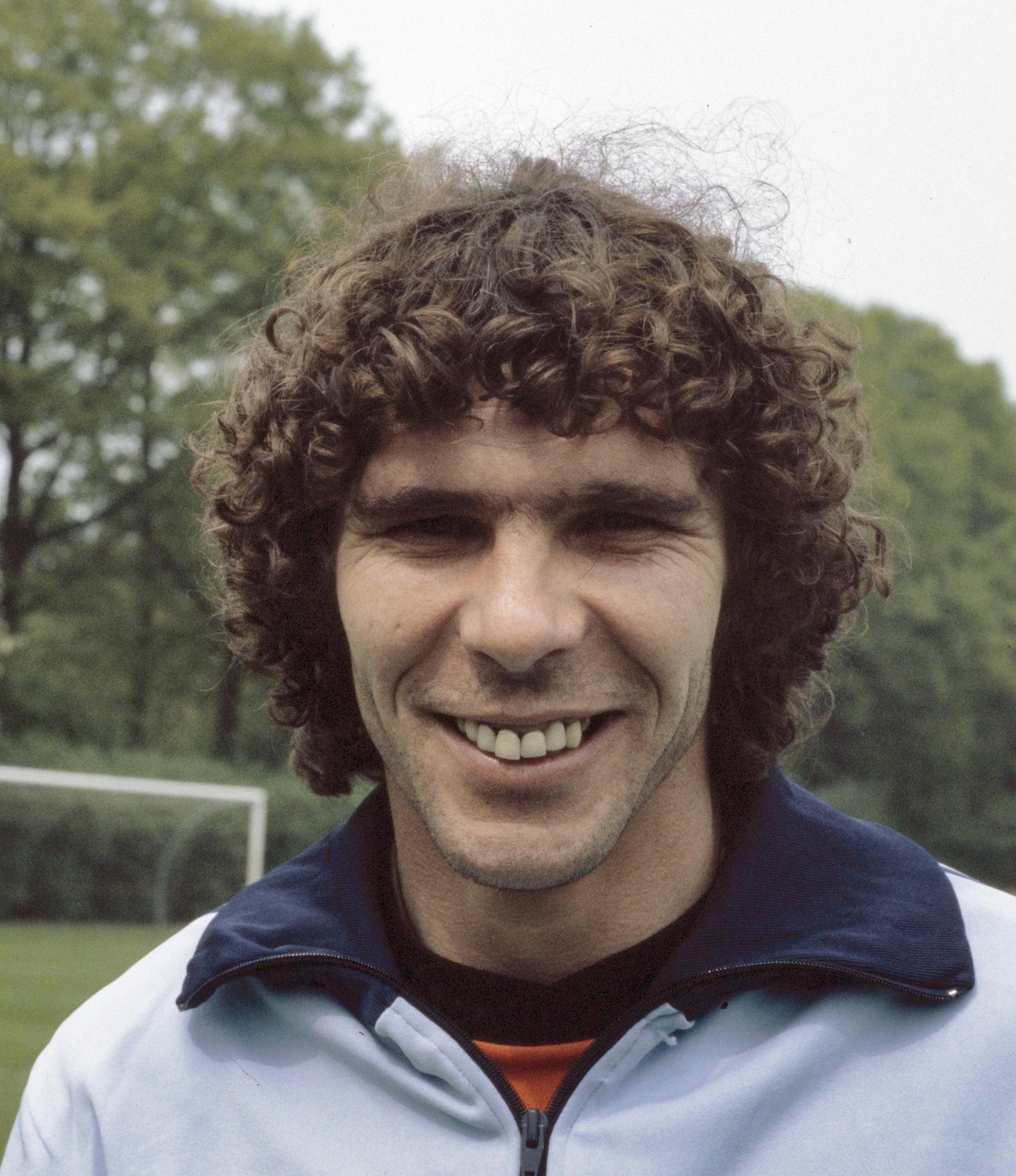
Van Hanegem in 1978

=== Player ===
Feyenoord

- Eredivisie: 1968–69, 1970–71, 1973–74
- KNVB Cup: 1968–69
- European Cup: 1969–70
- Intercontinental Cup: 1970
- UEFA Cup: 1973–74

AZ'67

- KNVB Cup: 1977–78

Netherlands

- FIFA World Cup: runner-up 1974
- European Football Championship: third place 1976
- Tournoi de Paris: 1978

Individual

- Dutch Footballer of the Year: 1971
- Officer in Order of Orange-Nassau: 2024

=== Manager ===
Feyenoord

- Eredivisie: 1992–93
- KNVB Cup: 1993–94, 1994–95

AZ

- Eerste Divisie: 1997-98
