= 1964–65 Tweede Divisie =

Tweede Divisie
- Season: 1964–65
- Champions: SC Cambuur
- Promoted: SC Cambuur; Xerxes
- Goals: 1,432
- Average goals/game: 3.19

The Dutch Tweede Divisie was contested by 31 teams in the 1964–65 season, sixteen of which played in group A, fifteen in group B. DFC won the championship after beating Cambuur Leeuwarden in a playoff. Two teams would be promoted: the winners of the championship play-off and the winners of the following promotion competition. This way, it turned out that Xerxes (the number three of group B) would be promoted to the Eerste Divisie after SC Cambuur.

== New entrants and group changes ==
=== Group A ===
Acquired football team:

- FC Zaanstreek (inherited professional licence from KFC)

Entered from the B-group:

- De Graafschap
- AGOVV Apeldoorn
- Vitesse Arnhem
- FC Wageningen

(Leeuwarden would play as SC Cambuur from this season onwards)

=== Group B ===
Relegated from the Eerste Divisie:

- Fortuna Vlaardingen
- BVV

Entered from the A-group:

- HVC
- HVV 't Gooi

== Final tables ==
=== Group A ===
Pos	Team	Pld	W	D	L	GF	GA	GD	Pts	Qualification
1	SC Cambuur	30	18	8	4	63	29	+34	44	Qualified for Championship play-off
2	AGOVV Apeldoorn	30	16	7	7	56	41	+15	39	Qualified for Promotion play-off
3	FC Wageningen	30	16	5	9	60	47	+13	37	Qualified for Best 3rd-place play-off
4	Vitesse Arnhem	30	13	10	7	48	39	+9	36	
5	HVV Tubantia	30	14	8	8	53	50	+3	36	
6	FC Zaanstreek	30	13	9	8	48	33	+15	35	
7	VV Zwartemeer	30	12	10	8	46	33	+13	34	
8	RCH	30	11	8	11	46	46	0	30	Tweede Divisie B next season
9	sc Heerenveen	30	10	10	10	35	39	−4	30	
10	Haarlem	30	10	7	13	43	44	−1	27	Tweede Divisie B next season
11	De Graafschap	30	11	3	16	50	54	−4	25	
12	ZFC	30	8	9	13	28	34	−6	25	
13	HFC EDO	30	8	9	13	39	52	−13	25	Tweede Divisie B next season
14	FC Hilversum	30	9	5	16	32	48	−16	23	
15	PEC	30	7	6	17	39	69	−30	20	
16	Zwolsche Boys	30	3	8	19	35	63	−28	14	

Source: rsssf.com

=== Group B ===
Pos	Team	Pld	W	D	L	GF	GA	GD	Pts	Qualification
1	DFC	28	20	5	3	71	25	+46	45	Qualified for Championship play-off
2	Helmondia '55	28	18	5	5	61	44	+17	41	Qualified for Promotion play-off
3	Xerxes	28	17	6	5	60	31	+29	40	Qualified for Best 3rd-place play-off
4	Roda JC	28	14	8	6	62	37	+25	36	
5	SVV	28	15	5	8	51	43	+8	35	
6	VV Baronie	28	10	10	8	49	41	+8	30	
7	BVV	28	12	6	10	33	37	−4	30	
8	Limburgia	28	12	5	11	46	48	−2	29	
9	Fortuna Vlaardingen	28	10	6	12	48	52	−4	26	
10	Hermes DVS	28	9	5	14	41	46	−5	23	
11	TSV NOAD	28	8	6	14	36	51	−15	22	
12	RKVV Wilhelmina	28	9	3	16	56	68	−12	21	
13	HVC	28	6	4	18	38	59	−21	16	Tweede Divisie A next season
14	HVV 't Gooi	28	4	5	19	26	51	−25	13	Play-off as level on points
15	LONGA	28	3	7	18	34	79	−45	13	Play-off as level on points

Source: rsssf.com

== Play-offs ==
Several play-offs were held to determine the league champions, who would be promoted to the Eerste Divisie, and who would leave the Professional leagues altogether.

=== Championship play-off ===
Team 1	Score	Team 2
Cambuur Leeuwarden	6 - 2	DFC

SC Cambuur were promoted to the Eerste Divisie, while DFC entered the Promotion Tournament.

=== Best 3rd-place play-off ===
Team 1	Score	Team 2
Xerxes	2 - 1	FC Wageningen

Xerxes entered the Promotion tournament.

=== Promotion tournament ===
To determine the second team to be promoted. Entering teams:

- the two 2nd-placed from the "regular season",
- the loser of the Championship play-off,
- and the winner of the Best 3rd-place play-off.

Pos	Team	Pld	W	D	L	GF	GA	GD	Pts	Promotion
1	Xerxes	3	2	1	0	6	2	+4	5	Promoted to Eerste Divisie
2	DFC	2	2	0	0	6	3	+3	4	
3	Helmondia '55	3	1	1	1	7	5	+2	3	
4	AGOVV Apeldoorn	3	0	0	3	2	11	−9	0	

Source: rsssf.com

=== Group B 15th Place play-off ===
Team 1	Score	Team 2
HVV 't Gooi	1 - 1	LONGA

However, LONGA voluntarily relegated themselves to amateur football after the game.
Therefore, a replay, as well as a relegation play-off (involving bottom-finishers Zwolsche Boys from Group A), did not have to be played (while HVV 't Gooi moved to Tweede Group A next season).

== See also ==
- 1964–65 Eredivisie
- 1964–65 Eerste Divisie
