= 1963–64 Tweede Divisie =

Tweede Divisie
- Season: 1963–64
- Champions: NEC
- Promoted: NEC; Alkmaar '54
- Goals scored: 1,643
- Average goals/game: 3.42

The Dutch Tweede Divisie in the 1963–64 season was contested by 32 teams, divided in two groups. NEC won the championship after beating Alkmaar '54 in a play-off.

Two teams would be promoted: the winners of the championship play-off and the winners of the following promotion competition. None of the teams relegated to amateur football.

== New entrants and group changes ==
=== Group A ===
Entered from the B-group:

- HVC
- HFC Haarlem
- RCH
- HVV t' Gooi
- FC Hilversum
- HFC EDO
- PEC

=== Group B ===
Relegated from the Eerste Divisie:

- Limburgia
- Roda JC

Entered from the A-group:

- AGOVV Apeldoorn
- NEC
- Vitesse Arnhem
- FC Wageningen
- De Graafschap

== Final tables ==
=== Group A ===
Pos	Team	Pld	W	D	L	GF	GA	GD	Pts	Qualification
1	Alkmaar '54	30	21	4	5	74	35	+39	46	Qualified for Championship play-off
2	VV Zwartemeer	30	18	5	7	62	31	+31	41	Qualified for Promotion play-off
3	RCH	30	16	6	8	55	39	+16	38	Qualified for Best 3rd-place play-off
4	sc Heerenveen	30	15	7	8	53	39	+14	37	
5	HVC	30	15	6	9	59	40	+19	36	Tweede Divisie B next season
6	HVV Tubantia	30	13	5	12	57	47	+10	31	
7	Zwolsche Boys	30	10	9	11	38	49	−11	29	
8	HFC Haarlem	30	10	8	12	54	41	+13	28	
9	Leeuwarden	30	9	9	12	50	52	−2	27	
10	KFC	30	10	7	13	45	49	−4	27	Voluntarily returned to amateur football
11	HVV 't Gooi	30	9	8	13	40	59	−19	26	Tweede Divisie B next season
12	Be Quick 1887	30	10	5	15	45	66	−21	25	Voluntarily returned to amateur football
13	FC Hilversum	30	6	13	11	30	44	−14	25	
14	PEC	30	8	8	14	54	60	−6	24	
15	ZFC	30	8	6	16	37	61	−24	22	
16	HFC EDO	30	6	6	18	33	64	−31	18	Qualified for Relegation play-off

Source: rsssf.com

=== Group B ===
Pos	Team	Pld	W	D	L	GF	GA	GD	Pts	Qualification
1	NEC	30	17	10	3	82	34	+48	44	Qualified for Championship play-off
2	Hermes DVS	30	18	6	6	48	24	+24	42	Qualified for Promotion play-off
3	Roda JC	30	16	8	6	81	40	+41	40	Play-off required as level on points
4	Xerxes	30	18	4	8	58	33	+25	40	Play-off required as level on points
5	De Graafschap	30	14	6	10	52	44	+8	34	Tweede Divisie A next season
6	Limburgia	30	13	7	10	49	48	+1	33	
7	Helmondia '55	30	12	7	11	56	49	+7	31	
8	AGOVV Apeldoorn	30	11	6	13	59	62	−3	28	
9	Vitesse Arnhem	30	10	8	12	44	51	−7	28	Tweede Divisie A next season
10	VV Baronie	30	10	6	14	46	55	−9	26	
11	TSV NOAD	30	8	10	12	45	54	−9	26	
12	SVV	30	8	9	13	54	62	−8	25	
13	RKVV Wilhelmina	30	10	5	15	53	69	−16	25	
14	DFC	30	6	12	12	46	54	−8	24	
15	FC Wageningen	30	7	8	15	49	73	−24	22	Tweede Divisie A next season
16	LONGA	30	4	4	22	35	95	−60	12	Qualified for Relegation play-off

Source: rsssf.com

== Play-offs ==
Several play-offs were held to determine the league champions, who would be promoted to the Eerste Divisie, and who would leave the Professional leagues altogether.

=== Championship play-off ===
Team 1	Score	Team 2
NEC	3 - 1	Alkmaar '54

NEC were promoted to the Eerste Divisie, while Alkmaar '54 entered the Promotion Tournament.

=== Group B 3rd-place play-off ===
Team 1	Score	Team 2
Roda JC	1 - 1	Xerxes

Team 1	Score	Team 2
Roda JC	2 - 2	Xerxes

Roda JC qualified for the Best 3rd Place play-off owing to a superior Goal Average in the "regular season".

=== Best 3rd-place play-off ===
Team 1	Score	Team 2
Roda JC	4 - 2	RCH

Roda JC entered the promotion tournament.

=== Promotion tournament ===
To determine the second team to be promoted. Entering teams:

- the two 2nd-placed from the "regular season",
- the loser of the Championship play-off,
- and the winner of the Best 3rd-place play-off.

Pos	Team	Pld	W	D	L	GF	GA	GD	Pts	Promotion
1	Alkmaar '54	3	2	0	1	6	6	0	4	Promoted to Eerste Divisie (Note: Alkmaar '54 were promoted owing to a better overall record in the "regular season".)
2	Zwartemeer	3	2	0	1	4	3	+1	4	
3	Roda JC	3	1	1	1	5	4	+1	3	
4	Hermes DVS	3	0	1	2	2	4	−2	1	

Source: rsssf.com

=== Relegation play-off ===
Team 1	Score	Team 2
HFC EDO	3 - 2	LONGA

However, as KFC & Be Quick 1887 both relegated themselves, LONGA retained their spot.

== See also ==
- 1963–64 Eredivisie
- 1963–64 Eerste Divisie
