= 1962–63 Eerste Divisie =

7th season of the second-tier football league in Netherlands

Eerste Divisie
- Season: 1962–63
- Champions: DWS
- Promoted: New league
- Relegated: Limburgia; Roda JC
- From Eredivisie: DWS; Roda JC; VVV
- To Eredivisie: DWS; Go Ahead
- Goals scored: 831
- Average goals/game: 3.46

The Dutch Eerste Divisie in the 1962–63 season was contested by 16 teams. Teams from the two leagues were united in one national Division for the first time this season. DWS won the championship for the first time.

== Entrants in the new national league ==
The following teams entered the new national Eerste Divisie, mainly from the A- and B-division from last season (1961–62):

Eerste Divisie A	Eerste Divisie B	Other
DHC	Elinkwijk	Velox ^{[Tweede]}
FC Eindhoven	Enschedese Boys	DWS ^{[Eredivisie]}
Fortuna Vlaardingen	Excelsior	Roda JC ^{[Eredivisie]}
Go Ahead	Limburgia	VVV ^{[Eredivisie]}
Sittardia	RBC Roosendaal	
Veendam	SHS	

^{[Tweede]} Champions of the 1961–62 Tweede Divisie
^{[Eredivisie]} Relegated from the 1961–62 Eredivisie

== League standings ==
Pos	Team	Pld	W	D	L	GF	GA	GD	Pts	Promotion or relegation
1	DWS	30	22	2	6	61	21	+40	46	Promoted to Eredivisie.
2	Go Ahead	30	17	7	6	69	36	+33	41	Promoted to Eredivisie.
3	RBC Roosendaal	30	15	7	8	56	41	+15	37	
4	Enschedese Boys	30	15	7	8	71	55	+16	37	
5	Velox	30	14	8	8	74	58	+16	36	
6	DHC	30	13	10	7	55	50	+5	36	
7	Fortuna Vlaardingen	30	12	7	11	55	51	+4	31	
8	SBV Excelsior	30	11	8	11	39	51	−12	30	
9	FC Eindhoven	30	10	7	13	51	53	−2	27	
10	Elinkwijk	30	11	5	14	54	67	−13	27	
11	SHS	30	10	6	14	42	47	−5	26	
12	Sittardia	30	11	3	16	41	40	+1	25	
13	Veendam	30	7	9	14	50	60	−10	23	
14	VVV	30	7	9	14	40	63	−23	23	
15	Limburgia	30	7	5	18	40	69	−29	19	Relegated to Tweede Divisie.
16	Roda JC	30	4	8	18	33	69	−36	16	Relegated to Tweede Divisie.

Source: rsssf.com

== See also ==
- 1962–63 Eredivisie
- 1962–63 Tweede Divisie
