= Hans Dorjee =

Dutch footballer (1941–2002)

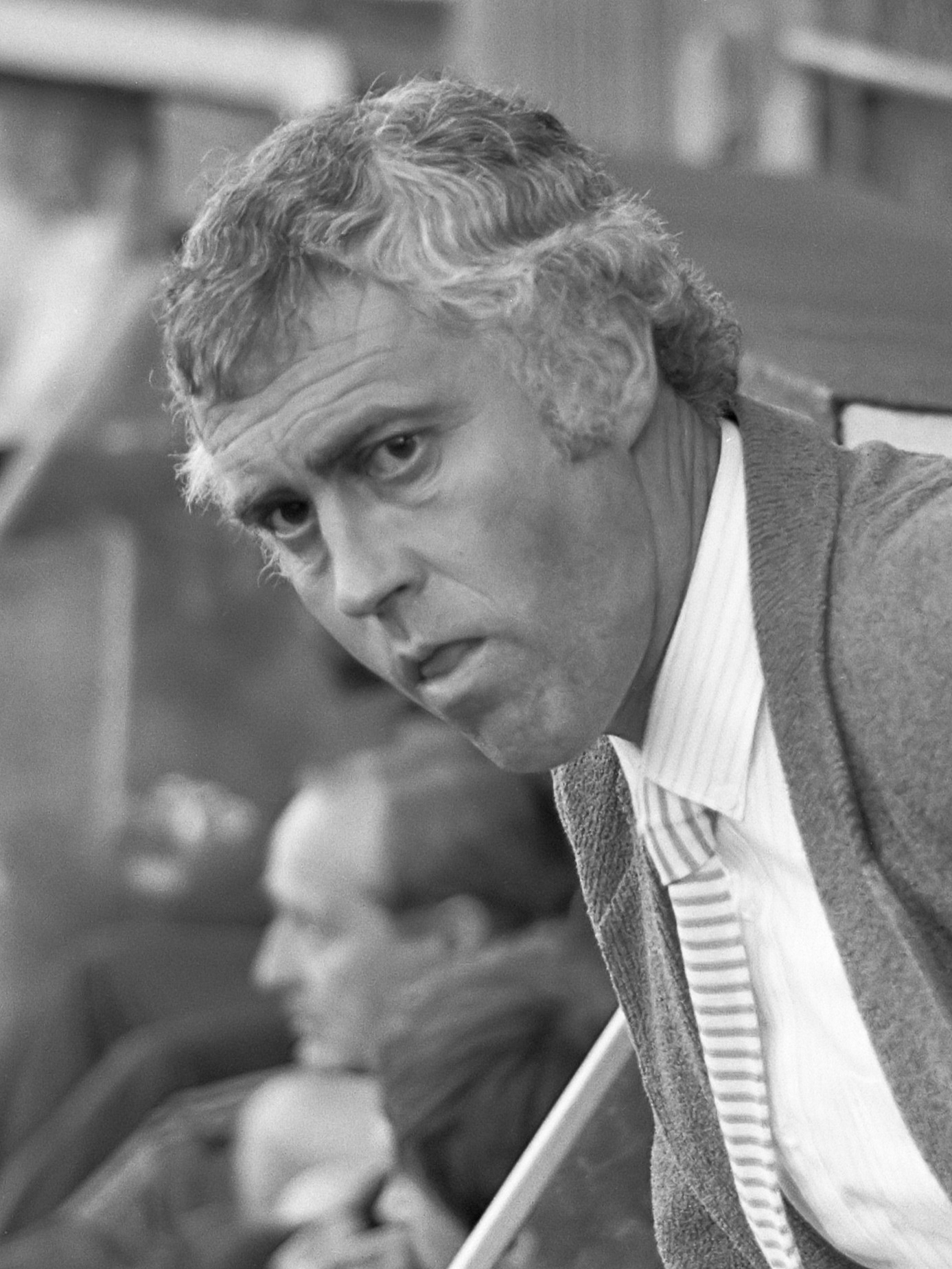
- Dorjee in 1982

Personal information
- Full name: Hans Pieter Hendrik Dorjee
- Date of birth: 26 July 1941
- Place of birth: Delft, Netherlands
- Date of death: 25 July 2002 (aged 60)
- Place of death: Delft, Netherlands
- Position: Left-back

Senior career*
Years	Team	Apps	(Gls)
1961–1966	DHC	97	(15)
1966–1968	Xerxes	59	(4)
1968–1971	Holland Sport	90	(5)
1972	Haarlem	0	(0)
Total		246	(24)

Managerial career
- 1971–1974: Hermes DVS
- 1974–1976: Xerxes
- 1976–1977: De Graafschap
- 1977–1979: NAC
- 1979–1980: FC Vlaardingen
- 1980–1982: Excelsior
- 1982–1984: DS'79
- 1986–1987: Vitesse
- 1987–1991: PSV (assistant)
- 1991–1992: Feyenoord
- 1993: AA Gent
- 1994–1995: FC Oss
- 1996: Netherlands (assistant)
- 1996–1998: Netherlands U-21
- * Club domestic league appearances and goals

Hans Dorjee (26 July 1941 – 25 July 2002) was a Dutch professional football player and manager.

== Playing career ==
Dorjee came through the youth system of hometown club DHC to make his senior debut for the club aged only 17. He lost the 1962 KNVB Cup final with DHC to Sparta. He then was snapped up by Xerxes, where he played alongside Rob Jacobs, Ab Fafié, Eddy Treytel and Willem van Hanegem only to return to Delft when Xerxes and DHC merged. The newly-formed club was dissolved a year later and Dorjee joined Holland Sport for which he scored the final goal of their existence and moved on to Haarlem. He would never play a game for Haarlem after being injured in preseason.

== Managerial career ==
Dorjee took up coaching after retiring as a player and won league titles with amateur sides – Hermes DVS and Xerxes, as well as with Eerste Divisie clubs Excelsior and DS'79. He also managed De Graafschap, with whom he suffered relegation from the Eredivisie, FC Vlaardingen and NAC.

=== PSV ===
The highlight of his professional career was being assistant to Guus Hiddink at PSV in the 1987-1990 seasons. Dorjee and Hiddink worked together for three full seasons and won the Eredivisie, KNVB Cup and UEFA Champions Cup in 1988. He stayed at the club when Hiddink left in 1990 and was succeeded by Bobby Robson, but Dorjee left the club in 1991.

=== Controversy at Feyenoord ===
He then was appointed manager of Feyenoord, but his time in charge was marred by heart problems and he was later dismissed after he accused the club of using and abusing him in a Dutch newspaper.

He later was a manager at FC Oss – the Dutch Olympic team and appointed assistant to Hiddink again when Holland played at UEFA Euro 1996. He quit coaching in 1998 for medical reasons.

== Personal life and death ==
While still at DHC, he married the daughter of a successful local butcher and they had two daughters. His wife suddenly died in 1967.

Dorjee died in Delft on 25 July 2002 and got a cardiac arrest (his third) during a game of tennis. He was going to celebrate his 61st birthday on 26 July, the day after his death.

== Honours ==
=== Manager ===
Feyenoord

- Johan Cruijff Shield: 1991
