= Frits de Graaf =

Dutch footballer

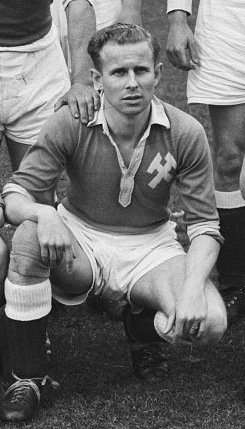
- De Graaf (1950)

Personal information
- Date of birth: 10 May 1926
- Place of birth: Brunssum, Netherlands
- Date of death: 30 August 1998 (aged 72)
- Place of death: Heerlen, Netherlands
- Position: Striker

Senior career*
Years	Team	Apps	(Gls)
1943–1953	Limburgia	142	(68)

International career
1950	Netherlands	3	(2)
- * Club domestic league appearances and goals

Frits de Graaf (10 May 1926 – 30 August 1998) was a Dutch footballer. He played in three matches for the Netherlands national football team in 1950.

De Graaf is the only Limburgia player who played for the Oranje. He retired at 26 due to a persistent knee injury. He was part of the Limburgia team that won the 1950 league title by beating Ajax in the final, with De Graaf scoring twice.
