= 1965–66 Tweede Divisie =

Tweede Divisie
- Season: 1965–66
- Champions: Vitesse Arnhem; FC Den Bosch
- Promoted: Vitesse Arnhem; De Graafschap; FC Zaanstreek; Zwartemeer; FC Den Bosch; SVV; DFC; RCH
- Goals scored: 1,397
- Average goals/game: 3.32

The Dutch Tweede Divisie in the 1965–66 season was contested by 30 teams, divided in two groups. It would be the last season the Tweede Divisie would be divided in two. From next season onwards, all teams would participate in one league. This also meant that more teams than before were promoted to the Eerste Divisie. No teams had to relegate to amateur football.

== New entrants and group changes ==
=== Group A ===
Relegated from the Eerste Divisie:

- Veendam

Entered from the B-group:

- HVC
- SC Gooiland (last season playing as 't Gooi)

=== Group B ===
Relegated from the Eerste Divisie:

- Excelsior

Entered from the A-group:

- RCH
- HFC Haarlem
- HFC EDO

FC Den Bosch played as BVV last season

== Group A ==
Pos	Team	Pld	W	D	L	GF	GA	GD	Pts	Promotion
1	Vitesse Arnhem	28	22	4	2	75	30	+45	48	Promoted to Eerste Divisie
2	De Graafschap	28	19	5	4	74	22	+52	43	Promoted to Eerste Divisie
3	FC Zaanstreek	28	13	11	4	43	25	+18	37	Promoted to Eerste Divisie
4	VV Zwartemeer (Note: Zwartemeer would be promoted under the name SC Drente.)	28	14	9	5	54	36	+18	37	Promoted to Eerste Divisie
5	HVC	28	12	10	6	43	32	+11	34	
6	Veendam	28	11	8	9	49	42	+7	30	
7	PEC	28	11	6	11	40	35	+5	28	
8	FC Wageningen	28	10	8	10	49	56	−7	28	
9	sc Heerenveen	28	9	6	13	43	58	−15	24	
10	HVV Tubantia	28	8	7	13	38	61	−23	23	
11	AGOVV Apeldoorn	28	8	4	16	38	53	−15	20	
12	FC Hilversum	28	5	9	14	27	47	−20	19	
13	SC Gooiland	28	3	12	13	34	54	−20	18	
14	ZFC	28	7	3	18	35	54	−19	17	
15	Zwolsche Boys	28	4	6	18	23	60	−37	14	

Source: rsssf.com

== Group B ==
Pos	Team	Pld	W	D	L	GF	GA	GD	Pts	Promotion
1	FC Den Bosch	28	14	13	1	58	25	+33	41	Promoted to Eerste Divisie
2	SVV	28	17	4	7	63	37	+26	38	Promoted to Eerste Divisie
3	DFC	28	14	8	6	63	41	+22	36	Promoted to Eerste Divisie
4	RCH	28	12	11	5	51	36	+15	35	Promoted to Eerste Divisie
5	Roda JC	28	12	10	6	48	28	+20	34	
6	VV Baronie	28	13	6	9	59	37	+22	32	
7	HFC Haarlem	28	10	7	11	50	50	0	27	
8	Limburgia	28	9	9	10	43	51	−8	27	
9	Excelsior	28	8	9	11	44	46	−2	25	
10	TSV NOAD	28	7	9	12	45	54	−9	23	
11	Fortuna Vlaardingen	28	7	8	13	36	48	−12	22	
12	Helmondia '55	28	10	2	16	49	74	−25	22	
13	Hermes DVS	28	7	6	15	40	58	−18	20	
14	RKVV Wilhelmina	28	4	11	13	42	62	−20	19	
15	HFC EDO	28	6	7	15	41	85	−44	19	

Source: rsssf.com

== See also ==
- 1965–66 Eredivisie
- 1965–66 Eerste Divisie
