= 1966–67 Tweede Divisie =

Tweede Divisie
- Season: 1966–67
- Champions: HFC Haarlem
- Promoted: HFC Haarlem; VVV-Venlo; HVC
- Goals scored: 1,454
- Average goals/game: 2.87

The Dutch Tweede Divisie in the 1966–67 season was contested by 23 teams. From this season onwards the league had been made into one. HFC Haarlem won the championship. Three teams would be promoted to the Eerste Divisie.

== New entrant ==
Relegated from the Eerste Divisie:

- VVV-Venlo

== League standings ==
Pos	Team	Pld	W	D	L	GF	GA	GD	Pts	Promotion or qualification
1	HFC Haarlem	44	27	9	8	94	36	+58	63	Promoted to Eerste Divisie
2	VVV-Venlo	44	22	15	7	79	41	+38	59	Promoted to Eerste Divisie
3	HVC	44	22	14	8	79	45	+34	58	Promotion play-off as level on points
4	Roda JC	44	22	14	8	72	39	+33	58	Promotion play-off as level on points
5	Veendam	44	24	10	10	72	48	+24	58	Promotion play-off as level on points
6	Fortuna Vlaardingen	44	19	17	8	66	37	+29	55	
7	FC Wageningen	44	21	11	12	67	46	+21	53	
8	PEC	44	23	6	15	82	68	+14	52	
9	Excelsior	44	21	9	14	69	53	+16	51	
10	Limburgia	44	18	15	11	64	51	+13	51	
11	TSV NOAD	44	21	9	14	66	59	+7	51	
12	VV Baronie	44	21	7	16	77	64	+13	49	
13	ZFC	44	17	10	17	51	52	−1	44	
14	Helmondia '55	44	14	14	16	56	53	+3	42	
15	Hermes DVS	44	13	12	19	63	65	−2	38	
16	SC Gooiland	44	10	18	16	42	50	−8	38	
17	RKVV Wilhelmina	44	12	13	19	67	86	−19	37	Voluntarily returned to amateur football
18	FC Hilversum	44	14	5	25	45	72	−27	33	
19	sc Heerenveen	44	12	7	25	47	92	−45	31	
20	HFC EDO	44	11	8	25	56	75	−19	30	
21	AGOVV Apeldoorn	44	13	4	27	58	84	−26	30	
22	HVV Tubantia	44	10	5	29	54	109	−55	25	Voluntarily returned to amateur football
23	Zwolsche Boys	44	1	4	39	28	129	−101	6	

Source: rsssf.com

== Promotion play-off ==
Due to the 3rd-, 4th- and 5th-place finishers obtaining an equal number of points, a promotion play-off needed to be held.

Pos	Team	Pld	W	D	L	GF	GA	GD	Pts	Promotion
1	HVC	2	1	1	0	5	1	+4	3	Promoted to Eerste Divisie
2	Roda JC	2	1	1	0	3	1	+2	3	
3	Veendam	2	0	0	2	0	6	−6	0	

Source: rsssf.com

== See also ==
- 1966–67 Eredivisie
- 1966–67 Eerste Divisie
