= 1962–63 Tweede Divisie =

Tweede Divisie
- Season: 1962–63
- Champions: VSV
- Promoted: VSV; BVV
- Goals: 1,825
- Average goals/game: 3.35

The Dutch Tweede Divisie in the 1962–63 season was contested by 34 teams. Due to a large number of teams entering from the higher Eerste Divisie after mass relegations there, there were 22 new entrants.

Teams were divided in two groups of seventeen teams. The champions played a play-off for promotion. After that match, a mini-tournament was held to determine a second team that would be promoted. It turned out that group B runners-up BVV would be promoted and not group B champions Haarlem.

== New entrants ==
There were only twelve teams that had been participating in this league last season, meaning there were 22 new entrants. Many of the new entrants were teams that were promoted in the previous seasons of the Tweede Divisie. Due to the reorganisation in professional football by the KNVB, many teams were back to where they started.

Relegated from the Eerste Divisie into group A

- AGOVV Apeldoorn
- Vitesse Arnhem
- KFC
- Alkmaar '54
- Leeuwarden
- Stormvogels
- ZFC
- Be Quick 1887
- FC Wageningen
- sc Heerenveen
- VSV

Relegated from the Eerste Divisie into group B

- SVV
- DFC
- HVV 't Gooi
- BVV
- HFC Haarlem
- Hermes DVS
- TSV NOAD
- FC Hilversum
- HVC
- RKVV Wilhelmina

Entered from amateur football

- Xerxes (entered in group B)

== Final tables ==
=== Group A ===
Pos	Team	Pld	W	D	L	GF	GA	GD	Pts	Qualification
1	VSV	32	20	7	5	63	34	+29	47	Qualified for Championship play-off (Note: Stormvogels merged with promoted VSV to form Telstar.)
2	AGOVV Apeldoorn	32	16	10	6	62	39	+23	42	Qualified for Promotion play-off
3	NEC	32	17	7	8	71	48	+23	41	Qualified for Best 3rd-place play-off
4	Alkmaar '54	32	15	9	8	64	39	+25	39	
5	KFC	32	15	8	9	57	41	+16	38	
6	Vitesse Arnhem	32	12	12	8	54	45	+9	36	Tweede Divisie B next season
7	Leeuwarden	32	13	7	12	60	64	−4	33	
8	ZFC	32	11	9	12	43	44	−1	31	
9	FC Wageningen	32	11	8	13	56	59	−3	30	Tweede Divisie B next season
10	Stormvogels	32	8	13	11	35	44	−9	29	Merged with VSV to form Telstar
11	Be Quick 1887	32	11	6	15	55	62	−7	28	
12	sc Heerenveen	32	10	8	14	48	60	−12	28	
13	HVV Tubantia	32	9	9	14	55	66	−11	27	
14	Zwolsche Boys	32	9	8	15	43	58	−15	26	
15	De Graafschap	32	9	7	16	32	52	−20	25	Tweede Divisie B next season
16	VV Zwartemeer	32	8	8	16	44	58	−14	24	
17	VV Oldenzaal	32	6	8	18	40	69	−29	20	Qualified for Relegation play-off

Source: rsssf.com

=== Group B ===
Pos	Team	Pld	W	D	L	GF	GA	GD	Pts	Qualification
1	Haarlem	32	18	8	6	71	46	+25	44	Qualified for Championship play-off
2	BVV	32	19	5	8	58	28	+30	43	Qualified for Promotion play-off
3	HVC	32	18	6	8	72	42	+30	42	Qualified for Best 3rd-place play-off
4	VV Baronie	32	14	10	8	59	44	+15	38	
5	RCH	32	13	10	9	65	47	+18	36	Tweede Divisie A next season
6	DFC	32	16	4	12	52	42	+10	36	
7	Hermes DVS	32	13	9	10	50	46	+4	35	
8	HVV 't Gooi	32	14	5	13	60	42	+18	33	Tweede Divisie A next season
9	TSV NOAD	32	10	13	9	58	59	−1	33	
10	Xerxes	32	13	6	13	80	64	+16	32	
11	FC Hilversum	32	11	8	13	36	48	−12	30	Tweede Divisie A next season
12	SVV	32	8	12	12	50	63	−13	28	
13	Helmondia '55	32	8	11	13	43	52	−9	27	
14	LONGA	32	11	3	18	66	81	−15	25	
15	RKVV Wilhelmina	32	10	3	19	44	79	−35	23	
16	HFC EDO	32	7	9	16	39	73	−34	23	Tweede Divisie A next season
17	PEC	32	7	2	23	40	87	−47	16	Qualified for Relegation play-off

Source: rsssf.com

== Play-offs ==
Several play-offs were held to determine the league champions, who would be promoted to the Eerste Divisie, and who would leave the Professional leagues altogether.

=== Championship play-off ===
Team 1	Agg.	Team 2	1st leg	2nd leg
VSV	5 - 4	HFC Haarlem	2 - 2	3 - 2

VSV were promoted to the Eerste Divisie (playing as Telstar), while HFC Haarlem entered the Promotion Tournament.

=== Best 3rd-place play-off ===
Team 1	Score	Team 2
HVC	2 - 1	NEC

HVC entered the promotion tournament, while NEC remained in the Tweede Divisie (and moved to Tweede B for next season).

=== Promotion tournament ===
To determine the second team to be promoted. Entering teams:

- the two 2nd-placed from the "regular season",
- the loser of the Championship play-off,
- and the winner of the Best 3rd-place play-off.

Pos	Team	Pld	W	D	L	GF	GA	GD	Pts	Qualification
1	BVV	3	2	0	1	5	4	+1	4	Play-off as level on points.
2	HVC	3	2	0	1	5	4	+1	4	Play-off as level on points.
3	HFC Haarlem	3	1	0	2	4	4	0	2	
4	AGOVV Apeldoorn	3	1	0	2	5	7	−2	2	

Source: rsssf.com

=== Play-off ===
Team 1	Score	Team 2
BVV	2-1	HVC

BVV were promoted to the Eerste Divisie, HVC and HFC Haarlem moved to the Tweede Group A next season, and AGOVV Apeldoorn moved to the Tweede Group B.

=== Relegation play-off ===
Team 1	Score	Team 2
VV Oldenzaal	5 - 2	PEC

However, as no amateur team wanted to enter professional football and VV Oldenzaal decided to return to amateur football on a voluntary basis, PEC weren't relegated.

== See also ==
- 1962–63 Eredivisie
- 1962–63 Eerste Divisie
