= 1965–66 Eerste Divisie =

10th season of the second-tier football league in Netherlands

Eerste Divisie
- Season: 1965–66
- Champions: Sittardia
- Promoted: SC Cambuur; Xerxes
- Relegated: VVV
- From Eredivisie: NAC Breda; Sittardia
- To Eredivisie: Sittardia; Xerxes; NAC Breda
- Goals scored: 750
- Average goals/game: 3.57

The Dutch Eerste Divisie in the 1965–66 season was contested by 15 teams, one less than in the previous year. This was due to the merger of Enschedese Boys with eredivisie-club SC Enschede, to form FC Twente. Sittardia won the championship.

== New entrants ==
Promoted from the 1964–65 Tweede Divisie:

- SC Cambuur
- Xerxes

Relegated from the 1964–65 Eredivisie:

- NAC Breda
- Sittardia

== League standings ==
Due to the expansion of the eredivisie to eighteen teams, and the expansion of this division to twenty teams next year, more teams were promoted and only one team relegated this year.

Pos	Team	Pld	W	D	L	GF	GA	GD	Pts	Promotion or relegation
1	Sittardia	28	19	3	6	68	38	+30	41	Promoted to Eredivisie.
2	Xerxes	28	18	4	6	67	26	+41	40	Promoted to Eredivisie.
3	NAC Breda	28	15	9	4	50	22	+28	39	Promoted to Eredivisie.
4	Alkmaar '54	28	15	6	7	64	45	+19	36	
5	Velox	28	15	5	8	56	48	+8	35	
6	NEC	28	13	7	8	54	39	+15	33	
7	FC Volendam	28	14	5	9	55	50	+5	33	
8	DHC	28	10	7	11	46	45	+1	27	
9	SC Cambuur	28	9	7	12	52	61	−9	25	
10	FC Eindhoven	28	8	8	12	51	54	−3	24	
11	Holland Sport	28	9	4	15	40	63	−23	22	
12	De Volewijckers	28	8	4	16	41	51	−10	20	
13	RBC Roosendaal	28	6	4	18	46	73	−27	16	
14	Blauw-Wit Amsterdam	28	3	10	15	28	57	−29	16	
15	VVV-Venlo	28	4	5	19	32	78	−46	13	Relegated to Tweede Divisie.

Source: rsssf.com

== See also ==
- 1965–66 Eredivisie
- 1965–66 Tweede Divisie
