= 1968–69 Tweede Divisie =

Tweede Divisie
- Season: 1968–69
- Champions: De Graafschap
- Promoted: De Graafschap; SBV Excelsior; Fortuna Vlaardingen
- Matches: 306
- Goals: 935 (3.06 per match)

The 1968–69 Tweede Divisie was contested by 18 teams. De Graafschap won the championship and would be promoted to the Eerste Divisie along with two other teams, SBV Excelsior and Fortuna Vlaardingen.

== New entrants ==
Relegated from the Eerste Divisie:

- FC VVV
- Velox

== League standings ==
Pos	Team	Pld	W	D	L	GF	GA	GD	Pts	Promotion
1	De Graafschap	34	20	9	5	77	29	+48	49	Promoted to Eerste Divisie.
2	SBV Excelsior	34	19	10	5	57	28	+29	48	Promoted to Eerste Divisie.
3	Fortuna Vlaardingen	34	15	14	5	52	29	+23	44	Promoted to Eerste Divisie.
4	Roda JC	34	20	2	12	75	54	+21	42	
5	Zwolsche Boys	34	15	7	12	50	49	+1	37	Merged into PEC
6	Limburgia	34	13	10	11	50	44	+6	36	
7	SC Gooiland	34	12	12	10	43	45	−2	36	
8	ZFC	34	13	9	12	47	43	+4	35	
9	sc Heerenveen	34	12	10	12	46	38	+8	34	
10	Velox	34	12	10	12	52	52	0	34	
11	VV Baronie	34	14	5	15	55	59	−4	33	
12	SC Drente	34	13	4	17	62	60	+2	30	
13	HFC EDO	34	11	8	15	43	51	−8	30	
14	TSV NOAD	34	10	8	16	48	59	−11	28	
15	VVV-Venlo	34	9	9	16	40	69	−29	27	
16	Hermes DVS	34	8	9	17	47	60	−13	25	
17	AGOVV Apeldoorn	34	10	3	21	44	84	−40	23	
18	PEC	34	8	5	21	47	82	−35	21	

Source: RSSSF

== See also ==
- 1968–69 Eredivisie
- 1968–69 Eerste Divisie
