= 1949–50 Netherlands Football League Championship =

Netherl. Football Championship
- Season: 1949–1950
- Champions: SV Limburgia (1st title)

The Netherlands Football League Championship 1949–1950 was contested by 60 teams participating in six divisions. The national champion would be determined by a play-off featuring the winners of the eastern, northern, two southern and two western football divisions of the Netherlands. SV Limburgia won this year's championship by beating Blauw-Wit Amsterdam, Maurits, Ajax, sc Heerenveen and Enschedese Boys.

At the end of this season, the KNVB re-aligned the current system of Regional Divisions into 5 new Divisions for 1950–51, to be called Eerste Klasse A-E.

== New entrants ==
Eerste Klasse South-I:

- Moving in from South-II: SC Helmondia, SV Kerkrade, NOAD, PSV Eindhoven and Sittardse Boys
- Promoted from 2nd Division: RBC Roosendaal

Eerste Klasse South-II:

- Moving in from South-I: BVV Den Bosch, Juliana, NAC, VV TSC and Willem II

Eerste Klasse West-I:

- Moving in from West-II: Feijenoord, Hermes DVS, KFC, VSV and Zeeburgia

Eerste Klasse Wëst-II:

- Moving in from West-I: AFC Ajax, HVV 't Gooi, SVV, De Volewijckers and Xerxes
- Promoted from 2nd Division: RCH

== Divisions ==
=== Eerste Klasse East ===
Pos	Team	Pld	W	D	L	GF	GA	GD	Pts	Qualification or relegation
1	Enschedese Boys	18	14	2	2	38	12	+26	30	Qualified for Championship play-off and transferred to Eerste B
2	Heracles	18	10	3	5	24	14	+10	23	Transferred to Eerste B
3	AGOVV Apeldoorn	18	6	7	5	27	29	−2	19	Transferred to Eerste B
4	HVV Hengelo	18	6	7	5	20	22	−2	19	Transferred to Eerste B
5	SC Enschede	18	6	5	7	22	22	0	17	Transferred to Eerste B
6	FC Wageningen	18	7	3	8	23	24	−1	17	Transferred to Eerste B
7	Zwolsche Boys	18	5	5	8	24	31	−7	15	Transferred to Eerste A
8	NEC Nijmegen	18	5	4	9	16	21	−5	14	Transferred to Eerste B
9	Go Ahead	18	5	4	9	22	31	−9	14	Transferred to Eerste A
10	Quick Nijmegen	18	4	4	10	26	36	−10	12	Relegated to 2nd Division

Source: rsssf.com

=== Eerste Klasse North ===
Pos	Team	Pld	W	D	L	GF	GA	GD	Pts	Qualification or relegation
1	sc Heerenveen	18	17	0	1	87	23	+64	34	Qualified for Championship play-off and transferred to Eerste A
2	GVAV Rapiditas	18	8	5	5	37	25	+12	21	Transferred to Eerste A
3	Sneek Wit Zwart	18	7	6	5	46	38	+8	20	Transferred to Eerste A
4	Achilles 1894	18	9	2	7	36	36	0	20	Transferred to Eerste A
5	LAC Frisia 1883	18	8	2	8	38	38	0	18	Transferred to Eerste A
6	Velocitas 1897	18	8	2	8	30	36	−6	18	Transferred to Eerste A
7	Be Quick 1887	18	8	2	8	41	43	−2	18	Transferred to Eerste A
8	VV Leeuwarden	18	6	3	9	38	33	+5	15	Transferred to Eerste A
9	HSC	18	6	3	9	32	45	−13	15	Transferred to Eerste A
10	LVV Friesland	18	0	1	17	11	79	−68	1	Relegated to 2nd Division

Source: rsssf.com

=== Eerste Klasse South-I ===
Pos	Team	Pld	W	D	L	GF	GA	GD	Pts	Qualification or relegation
1	Limburgia	19	12	3	4	38	22	+16	27	Qualified for Championship play-off and transferred to Eerste E
2	PSV Eindhoven	19	11	3	5	54	18	+36	25	Transferred to Eerste E
3	MVV Maastricht	18	8	4	6	35	25	+10	20	Transferred to Eerste E
4	VVV Venlo	18	8	4	6	37	37	0	20	Transferred to Eerste E
5	RBC Roosendaal	18	6	5	7	23	24	−1	17	Transferred to Eerste D
6	NOAD	18	5	7	6	21	24	−3	17	Transferred to Eerste D
7	Brabantia	18	7	3	8	22	29	−7	17	Transferred to Eerste E
8	Sittardse Boys	18	7	3	8	35	48	−13	17	Relegated to 2nd Division
9	SC Helmondia	18	6	3	9	19	21	−2	15	Transferred to Eerste E
10	SV Kerkrade	18	3	1	14	24	60	−36	7	Relegated to 2nd Division

Source: rsssf.com

=== Eerste Klasse South-II ===
Pos	Team	Pld	W	D	L	GF	GA	GD	Pts	Qualification or relegation
1	Maurits	18	13	2	3	43	20	+23	28	Qualified for Championship play-off and transferred to Eerste E
2	BVV Den Bosch	18	10	5	3	32	13	+19	25	Transferred to Eerste D
3	Willem II	18	11	1	6	47	24	+23	23	Transferred to Eerste D
4	LONGA	18	8	5	5	23	26	−3	21	Transferred to Eerste D
5	VV TSC	18	7	4	7	27	35	−8	18	Transferred to Eerste D
6	FC Eindhoven	18	6	5	7	31	30	+1	17	Transferred to Eerste E
7	NAC	18	4	8	6	20	22	−2	16	Transferred to Eerste D
8	Bleijerheide	18	4	6	8	25	29	−4	14	Transferred to Eerste E
9	SC Emma	18	2	5	11	16	42	−26	9	Transferred to Eerste E
10	Juliana	18	2	5	11	15	38	−23	9	Relegated to 2nd Division

Source: rsssf.com

=== Eerste Klasse West-I ===
Pos	Team	Pld	W	D	L	GF	GA	GD	Pts	Qualification or relegation
1	Blauw-Wit Amsterdam	18	12	4	2	49	25	+24	28	Qualified for Championship play-off and transferred to Eerste C
2	Hermes DVS	18	9	6	3	37	29	+8	24	Transferred to Eerste C
3	Sparta Rotterdam	18	10	3	5	34	17	+17	23	Transferred to Eerste D
4	ADO Den Haag	18	10	0	8	35	28	+7	20	Transferred to Eerste C
5	HFC Haarlem	18	6	4	8	36	30	+6	16	Transferred to Eerste C
6	Feijenoord	18	6	4	8	27	28	−1	16	Transferred to Eerste D
7	DOS	18	6	4	8	25	30	−5	16	Transferred to Eerste B
8	VSV	18	5	5	8	22	27	−5	15	Transferred to Eerste C
9	KFC	18	6	1	11	29	47	−18	13	Transferred to Eerste C
10	Zeeburgia	18	3	3	12	25	58	−33	9	Relegated to 2nd Division

Source: rsssf.com

=== Eerste Klasse West-II ===
Pos	Team	Pld	W	D	L	GF	GA	GD	Pts	Qualification or relegation
1	AFC Ajax	18	15	1	2	43	18	+25	31	Qualified for Championship play-off and transferred to Eerste B
2	De Volewijckers	18	13	3	2	43	16	+27	29	Transferred to Eerste C
3	HBS Craeyenhout	18	6	5	7	39	38	+1	17	Transferred to Eerste C
4	RCH	18	6	5	7	26	28	−2	17	Transferred to Eerste C
5	HFC EDO	18	5	6	7	31	36	−5	16	Transferred to Eerste C
6	SVV	18	6	3	9	41	46	−5	15	Transferred to Eerste C
7	HVV 't Gooi	18	6	3	9	22	32	−10	15	Transferred to Eerste B
8	Xerxes	18	4	6	8	24	32	−8	14	Transferred to Eerste D
9	SC Neptunus	18	5	3	10	20	35	−15	13	Relegated to 2nd Division
10	DWS	18	5	3	10	25	33	−8	13	Transferred to Eerste B

Source: rsssf.com

=== Championship play-off ===
Pos	Team	Pld	W	D	L	GF	GA	GD	Pts	Result	LIM	BWA	MAU	AJA	HEE	ENS
1	Limburgia	10	7	1	2	39	18	+21	15	Champion		6–2	4–3	3–2	7–0	4–1
2	Blauw-Wit Amsterdam	10	6	2	2	36	23	+13	14		3–3		3–4	3–2	5–2	7–1
3	Maurits	10	4	2	4	16	22	−6	10		2–1	1–4		0–5	0–0	0–1
4	AFC Ajax	10	4	0	6	21	22	−1	8		0–6	0–1	1–2		2–1	2–0
5	sc Heerenveen	10	3	2	5	22	34	−12	8		5–3	2–6	2–2	6–5		3–2
6	Enschedese Boys	10	2	1	7	10	25	−15	5		0–2	2–2	1–2	0–2	2–1	

Source: rsssf.com
