= 1963–64 Eerste Divisie =

8th season of the second-tier football league in Netherlands

Eerste Divisie
- Season: 1963–64
- Champions: Sittardia
- Promoted: BVV; Telstar
- Relegated: Fortuna Vlaardingen; BVV
- From Eredivisie: Willem II; De Volewijckers
- To Eredivisie: Sittardia; Telstar
- Goals: 807
- Average goals/game: 3.36

The Dutch Eerste Divisie in the 1962–63 season was contested by 16 teams. Sittardia won the championship for the second time.

== New entrants ==
Promoted from the 1962–63 Tweede Divisie:

- BVV
- Telstar (formed this season after a merger between VSV and Stormvogels)

Relegated from the 1962–63 Eredivisie:

- De Volewijckers
- Willem II

== League standings ==
Pos	Team	Pld	W	D	L	GF	GA	GD	Pts	Promotion or relegation
1	Sittardia	30	20	4	6	72	31	+41	44	Promoted to Eredivisie.
2	Telstar	30	16	7	7	44	24	+20	39	Promoted to Eredivisie.
3	SHS	30	16	6	8	58	42	+16	38	Renamed Holland Sport for next season.
4	FC Eindhoven	30	16	4	10	62	42	+20	36	
5	Velox	30	13	10	7	49	42	+7	36	
6	De Volewijckers	30	14	7	9	54	41	+13	35	
7	Elinkwijk	30	13	8	9	60	52	+8	34	
8	DHC	30	11	11	8	51	51	0	33	
9	SBV Excelsior	30	11	10	9	48	51	−3	32	
10	Willem II	30	13	5	12	72	55	+17	31	
11	RBC Roosendaal	30	8	10	12	41	38	+3	26	
12	Veendam	30	10	6	14	47	59	−12	26	
13	Enschedese Boys	30	9	5	16	59	77	−18	23	
14	VVV	30	7	9	14	38	66	−28	23	
15	Fortuna Vlaardingen	30	5	4	21	25	60	−35	14	Relegated to Tweede Divisie.
16	BVV	30	3	4	23	27	76	−49	10	Relegated to Tweede Divisie.

Source: rsssf.com

== See also ==
- 1963–64 Eredivisie
- 1963–64 Tweede Divisie
