= 1967–68 Eerste Divisie =

12th season of the second-tier football league in Netherlands

Eerste Divisie
- Season: 1967–68
- Champions: Holland Sport
- Promoted: HFC Haarlem; HVC; VVV-Venlo
- Relegated: VVV-Venlo; Velox
- From Eredivisie: Elinkwijk; Willem II
- To Eredivisie: Holland Sport; AZ'67
- Goals: 948
- Average goals/game: 2.77

The Dutch Eerste Divisie in the 1967–68 season was contested by 19 teams, one team less than in the previous season. This was due to a merger between FC Zaanstreek and Alkmaar '54 to form AZ'67. Holland Sport won the championship.

== New entrants ==
Promoted from the 1966–67 Tweede Divisie:

- HFC Haarlem
- HVC
- VVV-Venlo

Relegated from the 1966–67 Eredivisie:

- Elinkwijk
- Willem II

== League standings ==
Pos	Team	Pld	W	D	L	GF	GA	GD	Pts	Promotion or relegation
1	Holland Sport	36	23	7	6	72	30	+42	53	Promoted to Eredivisie.
2	AZ'67	36	18	14	4	57	22	+35	50	Promoted to Eredivisie.
3	FC Den Bosch	36	18	12	6	62	39	+23	48	
4	Willem II	36	20	6	10	69	40	+29	46	
5	Vitesse Arnhem	36	15	11	10	53	48	+5	41	
6	HFC Haarlem	36	13	14	9	49	41	+8	40	
7	Blauw-Wit Amsterdam	36	12	16	8	40	34	+6	40	
8	Elinkwijk	36	12	15	9	59	53	+6	39	
9	SC Cambuur	36	14	10	12	46	40	+6	38	
10	DFC	36	13	11	12	65	55	+10	37	
11	Heracles	36	13	11	12	49	45	+4	37	
12	HVC	36	12	13	11	47	44	+3	37	
13	FC Eindhoven	36	10	12	14	50	66	−16	32	
14	RBC Roosendaal	36	11	8	17	33	54	−21	30	
15	De Volewijckers	36	8	11	17	42	48	−6	27	
16	SVV	36	7	13	16	43	66	−23	27	
17	Racing Club Heemstede	36	7	9	20	39	65	−26	23	Relegation play-off as level on points.
18	VVV-Venlo	36	9	5	22	47	81	−34	23	Relegation play-off as level on points.
19	Velox	36	2	12	22	26	77	−51	16	Relegated to Tweede Divisie.

Source: rsssf.com

=== Relegation play-off ===
Racing Club Heemstede and VVV-Venlo entered a relegation play-off. After a draw in the first match, a second match was played. Both matches were played on neutral terrain (HVC and Vitesse).

Team 1	Score	Team 2
Racing Club Heemstede	3 - 3 aet	VVV-Venlo

Replay

Team 1	Score	Team 2
Racing Club Heemstede	4 - 3	VVV-Venlo

VVV-Venlo were relegated to the Tweede Divisie.

== Attendances ==
#	Club	Average
1	Holland Sport	11,583
2	Vitesse	8,344
3	AZ	8,111
4	Willem II	7,472
5	Den Bosch	7,083
6	Cambuur	6,194
7	Haarlem	5,972
8	Elinkwijk	5,306
9	DFC	4,344
10	HVC	4,319
11	Blauw-Wit	4,250
12	De Volewijckers	4,125
13	SVV	4,117
14	Heracles	4,056
15	RBC	3,778
16	VVV	3,628
17	Eindhoven	3,500
18	RCH	3,383
19	Velox	2,236

== See also ==
- 1967–68 Eredivisie
- 1967–68 Tweede Divisie
