= 1962–63 Eredivisie =

7th season of the Eredivisie

Eredivisie
- Season: 1962–63
- Champions: PSV Eindhoven (4th title)
- Promoted: Heracles
- Relegated: Willem II; De Volewijckers
- European Cup: PSV Eindhoven
- Cup Winners' Cup: Willem II
- Inter-Cities Fairs Cup: DOS
- Goals: 822
- Average goals/game: 3.42
- Top goalscorer: (Netherlands) Pierre Kerkhofs; PSV Eindhoven 22 goals

The Dutch Eredivisie in the 1962–63 season was contested by 16 teams. PSV Eindhoven won the championship. Last year, there were still sixteen participants, so there was only one promoted team this year.

== League standings ==
Pos	Team	Pld	W	D	L	GF	GA	GD	Pts	Qualification or relegation
1	PSV Eindhoven	30	17	8	5	67	38	+29	42	Qualified for 1963–64 European Cup
2	AFC Ajax	30	17	5	8	73	41	+32	39	
3	Sparta Rotterdam	30	17	5	8	60	38	+22	39	
4	Feijenoord	30	14	9	7	58	40	+18	37	
5	SC Enschede	30	12	9	9	58	46	+12	33	
6	NAC	30	11	10	9	51	48	+3	32	
7	DOS	30	13	6	11	37	44	−7	32	Qualified for 1963–64 Inter-Cities Fairs Cup
8	GVAV	30	12	6	12	52	47	+5	30	
9	MVV Maastricht	30	11	7	12	45	49	−4	29	
10	ADO Den Haag	30	9	10	11	41	36	+5	28	
11	Blauw-Wit Amsterdam	30	12	4	14	48	56	−8	28	
12	Fortuna '54	30	12	4	14	44	54	−10	28	
13	FC Volendam	30	8	11	11	50	53	−3	27	
14	Heracles	30	9	8	13	54	62	−8	26	
15	Willem II	30	7	8	15	53	68	−15	22	Qualified for 1963–64 European Cup Winners' Cup (Note: Willem II were also relegated to the Eerste Divisie, so represented the Netherlands in the 1963–64 European Cup Winners' Cup as a 2nd Division club.)
16	De Volewijckers	30	2	4	24	31	102	−71	8	Relegated to Eerste Divisie

Source: rsssf.com

== Results ==
Home \ Away	ADO	AJA	BLW	DOS	ENS	FEY	F54	GVA	HER	MVV	NAC	PSV	SPA	VOL	VWK	WIL
ADO		2–2	3–4	0–2	2–2	1–1	3–0	5–2	1–0	5–0	2–3	1–3	1–0	0–0	3–0	1–1
Ajax	1–0		3–0	2–1	2–0	1–3	6–3	0–0	1–0	3–1	1–3	1–1	1–2	1–3	6–2	7–0
Blauw-Wit	1–0	0–3		1–1	1–7	1–0	5–0	2–1	4–1	1–2	1–1	1–3	0–5	5–0	1–1	2–3
DOS	0–0	0–3	1–0		2–1	1–0	0–2	3–0	2–0	1–0	1–3	2–0	2–0	3–2	3–1	0–0
SC Enschede	1–0	0–6	0–1	2–0		1–2	2–0	2–2	0–0	0–1	1–1	1–2	3–1	1–1	4–0	5–2
Feijenoord	1–1	1–1	2–0	3–0	1–1		2–1	2–1	6–2	1–0	1–1	2–2	0–2	2–5	4–0	3–2
Fortuna '54	1–0	1–0	2–1	1–2	2–2	3–2		2–1	1–2	1–0	3–1	0–2	1–2	2–2	2–2	1–4
GVAV	3–1	1–2	1–2	3–1	3–3	1–1	4–2		2–1	0–1	1–0	1–1	2–0	2–2	6–1	2–0
Heracles	1–2	0–2	4–3	2–1	3–2	3–6	0–4	3–1		4–1	3–2	2–2	1–2	1–1	7–1	3–3
MVV	1–2	2–2	2–0	2–2	1–1	1–1	3–0	4–1	1–1		1–3	1–1	1–0	2–1	3–1	4–1
NAC	0–0	2–0	1–1	2–0	0–1	1–2	0–2	0–2	1–1	4–2		3–3	3–1	1–1	2–1	2–2
PSV	2–0	5–2	2–5	6–0	2–3	2–1	1–0	3–1	2–2	2–0	1–2		0–1	4–2	4–1	5–2
Sparta	1–1	2–1	4–1	5–1	4–2	3–0	2–0	0–1	2–1	3–2	5–5	0–0		3–2	4–0	2–1
Volendam	1–0	4–5	0–1	0–0	1–3	0–3	1–1	0–2	2–2	1–1	2–0	1–2	2–1		5–0	1–1
De Volewijckers	0–2	0–5	2–1	2–2	1–4	1–4	0–3	0–5	3–4	2–3	4–1	0–2	2–2	2–3		0–4
Willem II	2–2	2–3	1–2	1–3	2–3	1–1	2–3	3–0	1–0	4–2	2–3	0–2	1–1	2–4	3–1	

Legend: Blue = home team win; Yellow = draw; Red = away team win.

== Attendances ==
#	Club	Average	Change
1	Feijenoord	37,733	−9.9
2	Sparta	18,667	+27.4
3	ADO	17,100	+7.1
4	Ajax	15,033	−0.9
5	PSV	13,667	+1.0
6	DOS	12,813	+47.7
7	Enschede	12,567	+41.0
8	Fortuna	11,993	+34.6
9	Heracles	10,600	+0.4
10	Volendam	10,433	−13.5
11	GVAV	10,333	−4.5
12	NAC	9,633	+6.3
13	Blauw-Wit	8,433	−36.4
14	Willem II	7,567	−22.5
15	MVV	7,500	+8.1
16	De Volewijckers	6,533	−27.6

== See also ==
- 1962–63 Eerste Divisie
- 1962–63 Tweede Divisie
