= 1964–65 Eerste Divisie =

9th season of the second-tier football league in Netherlands

Eerste Divisie
- Season: 1964–65
- Champions: Willem II
- Promoted: Alkmaar '54; NEC
- Relegated: Veendam; SBV Excelsior
- From Eredivisie: Blauw-Wit Amsterdam; FC Volendam
- To Eredivisie: Willem II; Elinkwijk
- Goals: 809
- Average goals/game: 3.37

The Dutch Eerste Divisie in the 1964–65 season was contested by 16 teams. Willem II won the championship for the second time.

== New entrants ==
Promoted from the 1963–64 Tweede Divisie:

- Alkmaar '54
- NEC

Relegated from the 1963–64 Eredivisie:

- Blauw-Wit Amsterdam
- FC Volendam

== League standings ==
| Pos | Team | Pld | W | D | L | GF | GA | GD | Pts | Promotion or relegation |
|---|---|---|---|---|---|---|---|---|---|---|
| 1 | Willem II | 30 | 17 | 6 | 7 | 61 | 37 | +24 | 40 | Promoted to Eredivisie, however they played off for the title as level on points. |
| 2 | Elinkwijk | 30 | 18 | 4 | 8 | 44 | 29 | +15 | 40 | Promoted to Eredivisie, however they played off for the title as level on points. |
| 3 | Blauw-Wit Amsterdam | 30 | 14 | 9 | 7 | 53 | 39 | +14 | 37 | |
| 4 | Velox | 30 | 13 | 11 | 6 | 54 | 42 | +12 | 37 | |
| 5 | FC Volendam | 30 | 14 | 6 | 10 | 64 | 50 | +14 | 34 | |
| 6 | FC Eindhoven | 30 | 11 | 10 | 9 | 58 | 53 | +5 | 32 | |
| 7 | Enschedese Boys | 30 | 11 | 7 | 12 | 61 | 61 | 0 | 29 | merge with SC Enschede to form FC Twente. |
| 8 | VVV-Venlo | 30 | 9 | 11 | 10 | 46 | 51 | −5 | 29 | |
| 9 | De Volewijckers | 30 | 8 | 12 | 10 | 52 | 51 | +1 | 28 | |
| 10 | NEC | 30 | 10 | 8 | 12 | 55 | 59 | −4 | 28 | |
| 11 | Alkmaar '54 | 30 | 13 | 2 | 15 | 54 | 61 | −7 | 28 | |
| 12 | DHC | 30 | 9 | 8 | 13 | 47 | 60 | −13 | 26 | |
| 13 | Holland Sport | 30 | 7 | 11 | 12 | 39 | 45 | −6 | 25 | |
| 14 | RBC Roosendaal | 30 | 9 | 7 | 14 | 44 | 54 | −10 | 25 | |
| 15 | Veendam | 30 | 7 | 8 | 15 | 42 | 62 | −20 | 22 | Relegated to Tweede Divisie. |
| 16 | SBV Excelsior | 30 | 5 | 10 | 15 | 34 | 54 | −20 | 20 | Relegated to Tweede Divisie. |

Source: rsssf.com

=== Championship match ===
Willem II & Elinkwijk played a match to determine the league champions (on the field of BVV).

| Team 1 | Score | Team 2 |
|---|---|---|
| Willem II | 6 - 2 | Elinkwijk |

== See also ==
- 1964–65 Eredivisie
- 1964–65 Tweede Divisie
