= Wageningse Berg =

Park in Wageningen, Netherlands

Coordinates: 51°57′54″N 5°41′10″E

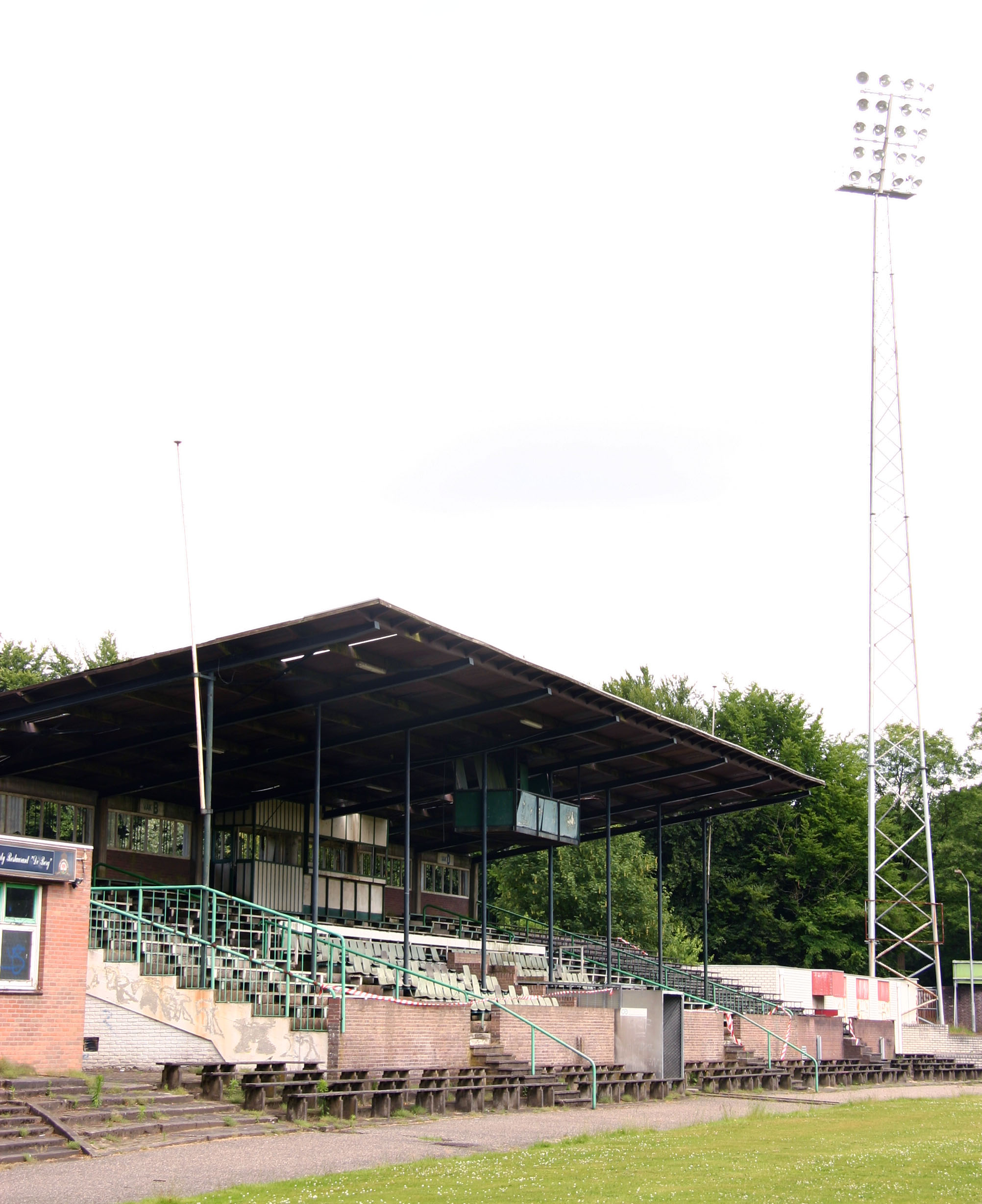
- Interactive map of Wageningse Berg
- Location: Wageningse Berg, Wageningen, Netherlands

Tenant
- FC Wageningen (defunct)

The Wageningse Berg (Dutch pronunciation: [ˈʋaːɣənɪŋsə ˈbɛr(ə)x]) is the southernmost part of the Veluwe, a range of hills that originated as a glacial moraine. It lies just north of the Nederrijn and to the east of the town of Wageningen and has an elevation of 42 m above mean sea level (NAP).

It is also the name of a football stadium home to the football club FC Wageningen, defunct since 1992. Since 2024 the stadium is in use again as a football team training camp ground.
