= Wim Lagendaal =

Dutch footballer

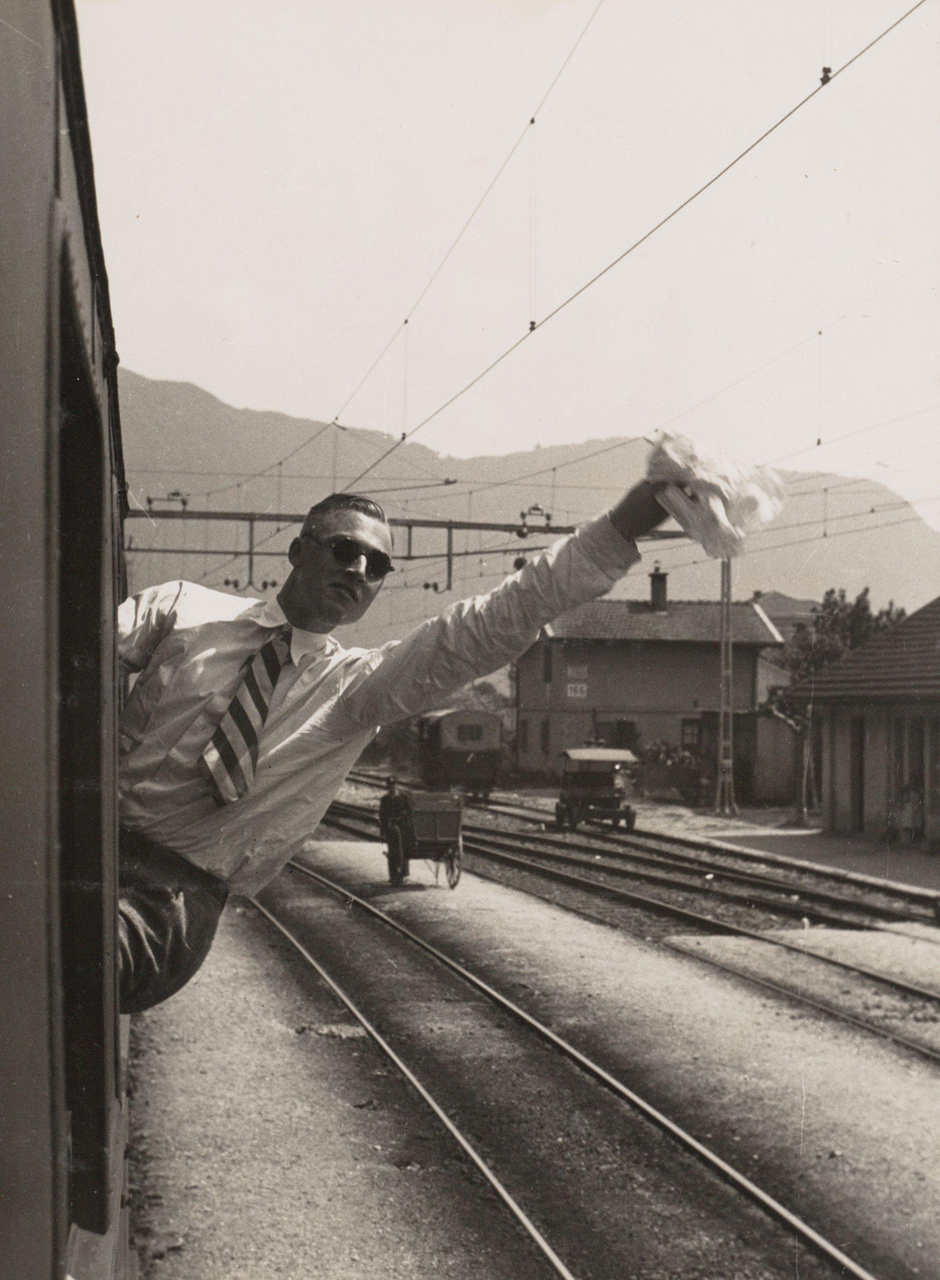

Personal information
- Date of birth: 13 April 1909
- Place of birth: Rotterdam, Netherlands
- Date of death: 6 March 1987 (aged 77)
- Position: Forward

Senior career*
Years	Team	Apps	(Gls)
- XerxesDZB

International career
1930–1935	Netherlands	15	(13)
- * Club domestic league appearances and goals

Willem Lagendaal (13 April 1909 – 6 March 1987) was a Dutch football forward who played for Netherlands in the 1934 FIFA World Cup. He also played for XerxesDZB.
