= 1965–66 Eredivisie =

10th season of the Eredivisie

Eredivisie
- Season: 1965–66
- Champions: AFC Ajax (11th title)
- Promoted: Willem II; Elinkwijk
- Relegated: Heracles
- European Cup: AFC Ajax
- Cup Winners' Cup: Sparta Rotterdam
- Inter-Cities Fairs Cup: DWS; DOS
- Goals: 779
- Average goals/game: 3.24
- Top goalscorer: (Netherlands) Willy van der Kuijlen (PSV Eindhoven); (Netherlands) Piet Kruiver (Feijenoord) - 23 goals

The Dutch Eredivisie in the 1965–66 season was contested by 16 teams. Ajax won the championship. Only one team was relegated this season, because in the next, the number of participants would be 18 again.

== Teams ==
A total of 16 teams are taking part in the league.

Location of teams in Eredivisie 1968–69

Club	Location
ADO Den Haag	The Hague
AFC Ajax	Amsterdam
DOS	Utrecht
DWS	Amsterdam
Elinkwijk	Utrecht
Feyenoord	Rotterdam
Fortuna '54	Sittard
Go Ahead	Deventer
GVAV	Groningen
Heracles Almelo	Almelo
MVV	Maastricht
PSV Eindhoven	Eindhoven
Sparta Rotterdam	Rotterdam
Telstar	IJmuiden
FC Twente	Enschede
Willem II	Tilburg

== League standings ==
Pos	Team	Pld	W	D	L	GF	GA	GD	Pts	Qualification or relegation
1	Ajax	30	24	4	2	79	25	+54	52	Qualified for 1966–67 European Cup
2	Feijenoord	30	21	3	6	65	30	+35	45	
3	ADO	30	15	9	6	72	37	+35	39	
4	DWS	30	15	6	9	48	30	+18	36	Qualified for 1966–67 Inter-Cities Fairs Cup
5	Go Ahead	30	14	8	8	49	33	+16	36	
6	GVAV	30	12	7	11	43	43	0	31	
7	Sparta Rotterdam	30	12	5	13	53	51	+2	29	Qualified for 1966–67 European Cup Winners' Cup.
8	PSV Eindhoven	30	10	8	12	57	53	+4	28	
9	Fortuna '54	30	9	8	13	36	54	−18	26	
10	Willem II	30	11	3	16	42	59	−17	25	
11	FC Twente	30	9	6	15	43	61	−18	24	
12	DOS	30	9	6	15	48	72	−24	24	Qualified for 1966–67 Inter-Cities Fairs Cup
13	Telstar	30	8	6	16	39	52	−13	22	
14	Elinkwijk	30	7	8	15	37	64	−27	22	
15	MVV Maastricht	30	6	9	15	36	56	−20	21	
16	Heracles	30	5	10	15	32	59	−27	20	Relegated to Eerste Divisie

Source: rsssf.com

== Results ==
Home \ Away	ADO	AJA	DOS	DWA	ELI	FEY	F54	GOA	GVA	HER	MVV	PSV	SPA	TEL	TWE	WIL
ADO		2–3	4–0	2–0	5–1	2–1	1–1	4–0	0–0	2–2	4–0	1–3	2–2	4–2	4–1	4–0
Ajax	5–1		2–1	2–1	7–0	2–0	5–1	4–0	5–1	1–0	1–1	2–0	0–1	6–2	3–1	3–1
DOS	0–7	1–2		2–3	2–0	0–3	2–2	1–5	3–2	3–2	2–2	3–1	5–1	2–0	3–0	0–2
DWS	2–1	0–2	1–2		2–0	2–0	4–1	1–2	3–1	4–1	4–1	2–2	1–1	2–0	1–1	0–0
Elinkwijk	1–1	3–3	6–2	1–0		1–3	3–2	0–0	1–1	1–0	2–2	1–3	1–2	3–3	2–1	0–1
Feijenoord	3–1	1–1	4–1	1–0	0–1		1–0	0–0	1–2	5–2	2–1	3–2	2–0	2–1	4–0	6–1
Fortuna '54	2–1	2–1	0–1	1–3	3–0	1–1		0–4	0–0	1–0	3–3	2–1	4–3	2–1	1–3	1–0
Go Ahead	0–1	1–2	1–1	2–1	3–0	1–2	0–0		2–0	2–0	1–1	3–1	2–2	2–1	2–0	5–2
GVAV	1–1	0–2	5–3	0–0	4–0	2–1	2–0	2–4		1–1	2–0	2–0	1–0	4–2	0–2	4–1
Heracles	2–2	1–1	2–2	0–1	2–2	1–3	1–1	0–0	2–1		1–0	0–3	3–1	1–1	2–0	0–3
MVV	0–3	0–1	2–2	0–1	1–0	0–2	5–0	1–0	1–0	2–2		1–1	2–4	0–1	3–2	3–1
PSV	3–5	0–2	2–0	1–3	1–1	1–3	2–2	2–2	0–2	5–1	2–1		2–1	3–1	2–2	5–2
Sparta	0–4	1–3	3–1	1–0	2–1	0–2	2–1	0–3	1–2	6–0	7–2	1–1		1–0	3–4	0–1
Telstar	2–2	1–2	1–0	2–2	3–1	0–2	3–0	0–1	2–0	0–2	3–1	3–1	0–0		1–0	1–3
FC Twente	0–0	0–2	5–1	0–3	3–1	1–3	1–0	3–1	1–1	4–1	0–0	1–7	0–4	1–1		6–1
Willem II	0–1	1–4	2–2	0–1	2–3	3–4	0–2	1–0	4–0	1–0	2–0	0–0	1–3	2–1	4–0	

Legend: Blue = home team win; Yellow = draw; Red = away team win.

== Attendances ==
#	Club	Average	Change
1	Feijenoord	39,400	−15.9
2	Ajax	24,533	+68.8
3	DWS	18,133	−5.4
4	ADO	16,700	−7.4
5	Sparta	15,333	−5.2
6	Go Ahead	13,000	−6.3
7	GVAV	11,000	−2.1
8	PSV	10,967	−14.8
9	DOS	10,780	+19.8
10	Willem II	9,200	+29.6
11	Elinkwijk	9,080	+9.6
12	MVV	8,567	−12.6
13	Telstar	8,100	−20.1
14	Heracles	8,033	−19.2
15	Twente	8,020	−6.4
16	Fortuna	7,733	−37.5

== See also ==
- 1965–66 Eerste Divisie
- 1965–66 Tweede Divisie
