= 1963–64 Eredivisie =

8th season of the Eredivisie

Eredivisie
- Season: 1963–64
- Champions: DWS (1st title)
- Promoted: DWS; Go Ahead
- Relegated: Blauw-Wit Amsterdam; FC Volendam
- European Cup: DWS
- Cup Winners' Cup: Fortuna '54
- Inter-Cities Fairs Cup: DOS
- Goals: 825
- Average goals/game: 3.43
- Top goalscorer: (Netherlands) Frans Geurtsen; DWS 28 goals
- Biggest home win: Feijenoord–NAC 10:0
- Biggest away win: FC Volendam–Feijenoord 0:8
- Highest scoring: Feijenoord–NAC 10:0; Feijenoord–MVV Maastricht 9:1

The Dutch Eredivisie in the 1963–64 season was contested by 16 teams. DWS (just promoted to the Eredivisie this year) won the championship.

== League standings ==
Pos	Team	Pld	W	D	L	GF	GA	GD	Pts	Qualification or relegation
1	DWS	30	19	5	6	58	28	+30	43	Qualified for 1964–65 European Cup
2	PSV Eindhoven	30	18	5	7	66	42	+24	41	
3	SC Enschede	30	14	11	5	63	45	+18	39	
4	Feijenoord	30	16	5	9	77	33	+44	37	
5	AFC Ajax	30	13	8	9	63	40	+23	34	
6	NAC	30	14	6	10	56	53	+3	34	
7	Fortuna '54	30	10	10	10	50	48	+2	30	Qualified for 1964–65 European Cup Winners' Cup
8	GVAV	30	11	8	11	46	45	+1	30	
9	DOS	30	12	6	12	52	54	−2	30	Qualified for 1964–65 Inter-Cities Fairs Cup
10	ADO Den Haag	30	12	6	12	47	60	−13	30	
11	MVV Maastricht	30	9	9	12	40	53	−13	27	
12	Go Ahead	30	7	10	13	42	62	−20	24	
13	Heracles	30	8	7	15	44	65	−21	23	
14	Sparta Rotterdam	30	6	10	14	34	52	−18	22	
15	Blauw-Wit Amsterdam	30	5	8	17	44	71	−27	18	Relegated to Eerste Divisie
16	FC Volendam	30	4	10	16	43	74	−31	18	Relegated to Eerste Divisie

Source: rsssf.com

== Results ==
Home \ Away	ADO	AJA	BLW	DOS	DWA	ENS	FEY	F54	GOA	GVA	HER	MVV	NAC	PSV	SPA	VOL
ADO		1–0	3–0	4–2	2–3	1–1	1–0	1–2	0–1	3–1	2–2	2–1	3–4	1–1	1–4	3–1
Ajax	3–0		1–1	6–1	1–1	1–1	1–1	4–1	4–2	4–2	7–0	3–1	2–2	2–0	0–0	2–3
Blauw-Wit	1–2	0–1		3–1	0–2	2–4	1–7	2–2	1–1	1–1	3–4	1–2	0–2	2–4	3–2	3–0
DOS	4–0	3–1	4–2		0–2	1–1	1–2	2–1	2–4	2–1	5–2	1–1	2–0	2–3	2–0	2–0
DWS/A	9–0	0–3	3–2	3–1		0–1	2–0	6–0	0–0	3–1	2–1	1–0	2–3	1–2	1–1	0–0
SC Enschede	1–0	2–1	1–0	1–1	0–1		2–2	2–2	1–1	4–2	3–1	4–1	1–3	2–2	2–0	5–2
Feijenoord	5–1	1–1	3–0	4–2	0–1	3–1		1–0	6–1	1–0	1–1	9–1	10–0	4–2	0–1	4–1
Fortuna '54	2–0	2–1	2–2	4–0	1–2	1–3	1–2		1–1	1–1	4–1	1–1	1–2	3–1	0–0	2–0
Go Ahead	3–4	1–0	3–4	0–2	1–1	3–2	0–2	1–2		2–2	1–2	1–3	2–0	0–5	2–0	2–2
GVAV	1–2	3–1	2–0	3–0	1–2	1–5	3–0	2–2	2–1		2–0	1–0	1–0	3–1	3–0	2–1
Heracles	1–1	1–0	4–1	0–2	0–1	2–2	3–0	1–3	1–1	2–2		5–1	0–3	1–3	1–0	3–1
MVV	1–2	2–2	1–2	2–1	0–1	3–0	1–0	0–0	2–2	2–1	1–1		1–0	1–1	2–2	3–1
NAC	2–2	2–3	0–0	0–0	2–1	2–4	3–1	4–2	4–0	0–0	5–0	2–3		0–1	2–1	4–3
PSV	2–1	2–0	5–3	1–1	0–2	2–3	1–0	3–2	5–0	4–1	3–2	3–1	2–2		2–0	2–0
Sparta	0–2	2–5	2–2	1–3	4–2	2–2	0–0	1–1	0–3	1–1	2–1	2–1	3–0	0–2		1–1
Volendam	2–2	2–3	2–2	2–2	1–3	2–2	0–8	1–4	2–2	0–0	3–1	1–1	2–3	2–1	5–2	

Legend: Blue = home team win; Yellow = draw; Red = away team win.

== Attendances ==
#	Club	Average	Change
1	Feijenoord	35,600	−5.7
2	Sparta	19,800	+6.1
3	ADO	18,433	+7.8
4	Ajax	17,900	+19.1
5	DWS	16,400	+90.7
6	PSV	14,600	+6.8
7	Go Ahead	13,533	+29.7
8	Groningen	12,733	+23.2
9	Enschede	11,600	−7.7
10	DOS	11,500	−10.2
11	NAC	9,900	+2.8
12	Fortuna	9,867	−17.7
13	Heracles	9,567	−9.7
14	MVV	9,067	+20.9
15	Blauw-Wit	6,967	−17.4
16	Volendam	6,167	−40.9

== See also ==
- Eerste Divisie 1963–64
- Tweede Divisie 1963–64
