= 1964–65 Eredivisie =

9th season of the Eredivisie

Eredivisie
- Season: 1964–65
- Champions: Feijenoord (8th title)
- Promoted: Telstar; Sittardia
- Relegated: Sittardia; NAC
- European Cup: Feijenoord
- Cup Winners' Cup: Go Ahead
- Inter-Cities Fairs Cup: DOS
- Goals: 681
- Average goals/game: 2.83
- Top goalscorer: (Netherlands) Frans Geurtsen; DWS 23 goals

The Dutch Eredivisie in the 1964–65 season was contested by 16 teams. Feijenoord won the championship.

== Teams ==
A total of 16 teams are taking part in the league.

Location of teams in Eredivisie 1968–69

Club	Location
ADO Den Haag	The Hague
AFC Ajax	Amsterdam
DOS	Utrecht
DWS	Amsterdam
Feyenoord	Rotterdam
Fortuna '54	Sittard
Go Ahead	Deventer
GVAV	Groningen
Heracles Almelo	Almelo
MVV	Maastricht
NAC Breda	Breda
PSV Eindhoven	Eindhoven
SC Enschede	Enschede
Sittardia	Sittard
Sparta Rotterdam	Rotterdam
Telstar	IJmuiden

== League standings ==
Pos	Team	Pld	W	D	L	GF	GA	GD	Pts	Qualification or relegation
1	Feijenoord	30	21	3	6	77	30	+47	45	Qualified for 1965–66 European Cup
2	DWS	30	15	10	5	55	28	+27	40	
3	ADO Den Haag	30	13	7	10	37	32	+5	33	
4	PSV Eindhoven	30	13	7	10	48	45	+3	33	
5	Sparta Rotterdam	30	11	9	10	39	40	−1	31	
6	Fortuna '54	30	13	5	12	44	49	−5	31	
7	SC Enschede	30	9	12	9	33	37	−4	30	Merged with Enschedese Boys to form FC Twente '65
8	MVV Maastricht	30	11	7	12	41	51	−10	29	
9	Heracles	30	11	7	12	36	52	−16	29	
10	Telstar	30	9	10	11	31	36	−5	28	
11	Go Ahead	30	8	11	11	36	36	0	27	Qualified for 1965–66 European Cup Winners' Cup
12	DOS	30	8	11	11	43	52	−9	27	Qualified for 1965–66 Inter-Cities Fairs Cup
13	Ajax	30	9	8	13	52	51	+1	26	
14	GVAV	30	8	10	12	39	47	−8	26	
15	Sittardia	30	8	7	15	36	46	−10	23	Relegated to Eerste Divisie
16	NAC	30	7	8	15	34	49	−15	22	Relegated to Eerste Divisie

Source: rsssf.com

== Results ==
Home \ Away	ADO	AJA	DOS	DWA	ENS	FEY	F54	GOA	GVA	HER	MVV	NAC	PSV	SIT	SPA	TEL
ADO		2–1	2–1	1–0	0–0	3–0	1–2	0–3	4–1	2–0	0–1	2–2	0–1	1–0	1–0	1–1
Ajax	5–1		0–0	0–3	1–2	1–1	2–1	4–1	1–1	1–4	9–3	3–0	5–0	1–0	1–3	0–2
DOS	0–3	2–2		1–2	0–2	3–1	0–3	3–1	2–3	1–4	1–1	1–1	2–0	2–1	0–4	3–1
DWS/A	1–1	1–1	0–0		3–1	2–1	0–2	1–1	3–1	5–0	4–1	3–1	1–1	2–0	7–1	2–1
SC Enschede	1–0	0–4	2–2	0–0		2–0	0–0	0–0	2–1	1–0	1–1	6–1	1–3	3–0	1–1	1–3
Feijenoord	2–1	9–4	4–2	3–1	4–0		5–0	1–1	1–1	5–0	3–0	5–1	1–0	2–1	3–1	4–1
Fortuna '54	2–3	2–0	2–4	1–2	2–2	1–0		2–1	1–0	2–0	0–0	1–6	2–5	0–3	3–1	0–1
Go Ahead	0–1	1–0	3–3	1–2	0–0	0–1	1–3		0–0	2–2	1–0	2–0	0–1	1–1	1–1	0–1
GVAV	0–0	3–1	0–1	1–5	1–0	1–3	3–3	2–2		0–0	5–2	3–0	0–1	2–0	1–2	1–1
Heracles	1–1	1–0	1–0	1–0	1–2	1–5	2–4	0–6	0–0		3–2	4–2	1–4	0–3	1–1	1–1
MVV	1–0	2–2	2–2	2–0	2–0	1–2	1–0	1–0	3–0	1–0		3–1	0–3	2–3	2–0	0–2
NAC	0–1	1–2	3–0	1–2	1–1	1–0	0–1	2–0	1–0	0–0	1–1		1–0	2–2	1–2	2–0
PSV	3–3	3–0	1–1	0–0	0–0	0–4	1–2	3–4	2–2	0–1	0–3	1–0		1–3	3–2	3–2
Sittardia	0–1	2–1	1–1	1–1	2–1	0–2	2–2	0–1	4–2	1–4	2–1	1–1	2–5		1–2	0–1
Sparta	1–0	0–0	1–1	2–2	3–0	0–3	1–0	0–0	0–1	0–2	5–1	1–0	2–2	1–0		1–1
Telstar	2–1	0–0	1–4	0–0	1–1	0–2	2–0	1–2	2–3	0–1	1–1	1–1	0–1	0–0	1–0	

Legend: Blue = home team win; Yellow = draw; Red = away team win.

== Attendances ==
No.	Club	Average	Change
1	Feijenoord	46,833	31,6%
2	AFC DWS	19,167	16,9%
3	ADO Den Haag	18,033	-2,2%
4	Sparta Rotterdam	16,173	-18,3%
5	AFC Ajax	14,533	-18,8%
6	Go Ahead	13,867	2,5%
7	PSV	12,867	-11,9%
8	Fortuna '54	12,367	25,3%
9	FC Groningen	11,233	-11,8%
10	RKSV Sittardia	11,100	77,1%
11	SC Telstar	10,133	48,3%
12	Heracles	9,947	4,0%
13	MVV Maastricht	9,800	8,1%
14	VV DOS	9,000	-21,7%
15	SC Enschede	8,567	-26,1%
16	NAC	8,533	-13,8%

== See also ==
- 1964–65 Eerste Divisie
- 1964–65 Tweede Divisie
