= Rob Jacobs =

Dutch footballer and manager

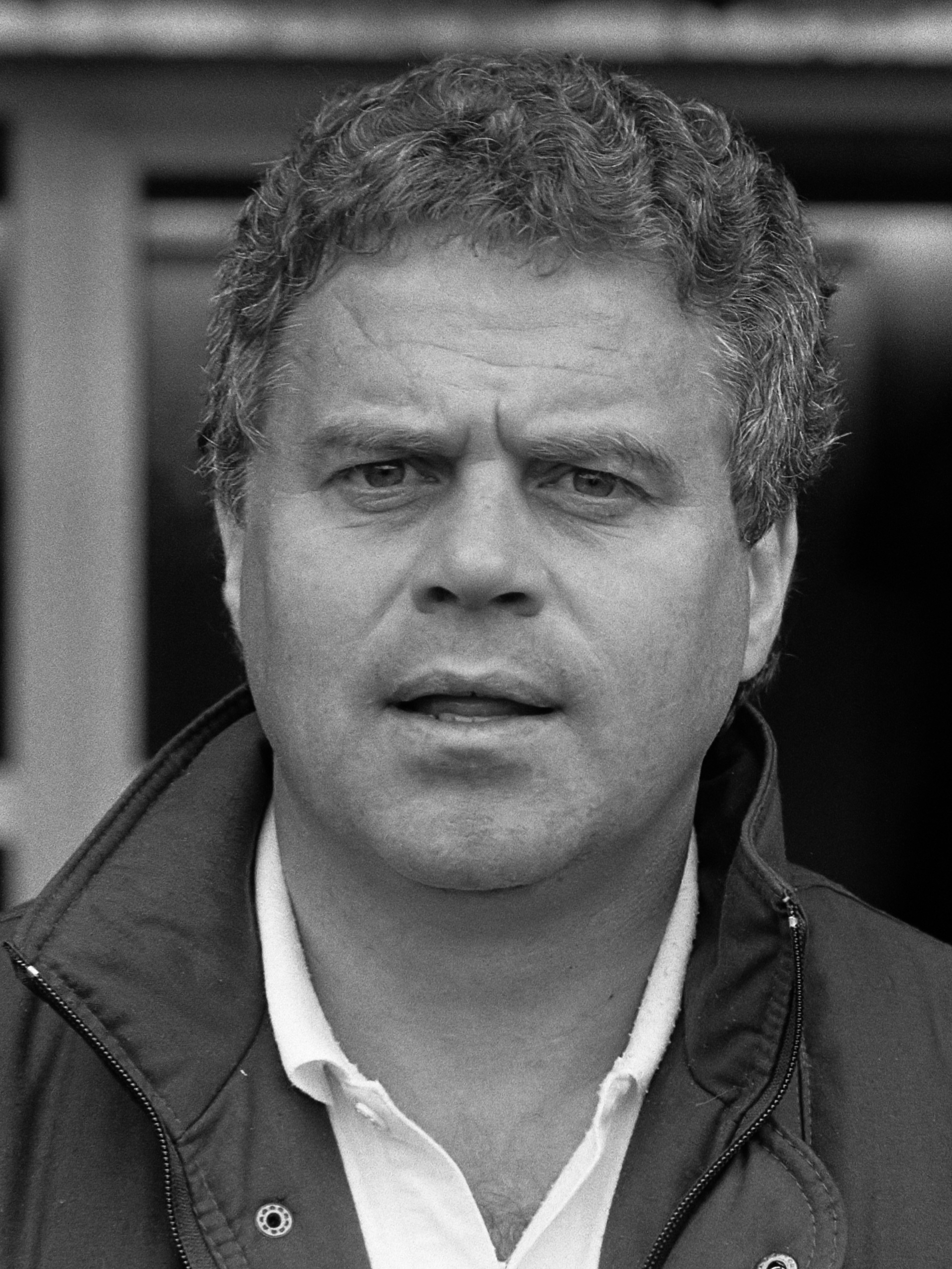

Personal information
- Date of birth: 15 October 1943 (age 83)
- Place of birth: Rotterdam, Netherlands
- Position: Right-back

Senior career*
Years	Team	Apps	(Gls)
1963–1965	Feijenoord		
1965–1968	Xerxes DHC		
1968–1971	Excelsior		

Managerial career
- 1982–1986: Excelsior
- 1986–1987: Groningen
- 1987–1988: Roda JC
- 1988–1989: Feyenoord
- 1989–1990: PAOK
- 1991–1993: Sparta Rotterdam
- 1993–1994: Panachaiki
- 1994–1995: FC Eindhoven
- 1997-1998: Pelita Jaya
- * Club domestic league appearances and goals

Rob Jacobs (born 15 October 1943) is a Dutch former association football player and manager.

A right-back, played for Feijenoord, Xerxes DHC and SBV Excelsior.

He coached SBV Excelsior, FC Groningen, Roda JC, Feyenoord, PAOK, Sparta Rotterdam, Panachaiki and FC Eindhoven.
