= 1966–67 Eredivisie =

11th season of the Eredivisie

Eredivisie
- Season: 1966–67
- Champions: AFC Ajax (12th title)
- Promoted: Sittardia; Xerxes; NAC
- Relegated: Elinkwijk; Willem II
- European Cup: AFC Ajax
- Cup Winners' Cup: NAC
- Inter-Cities Fairs Cup: DWS; DOS
- Goals: 963
- Average goals/game: 3.14
- Top goalscorer: (Netherlands) Johan Cruijff; AFC Ajax 33 goals

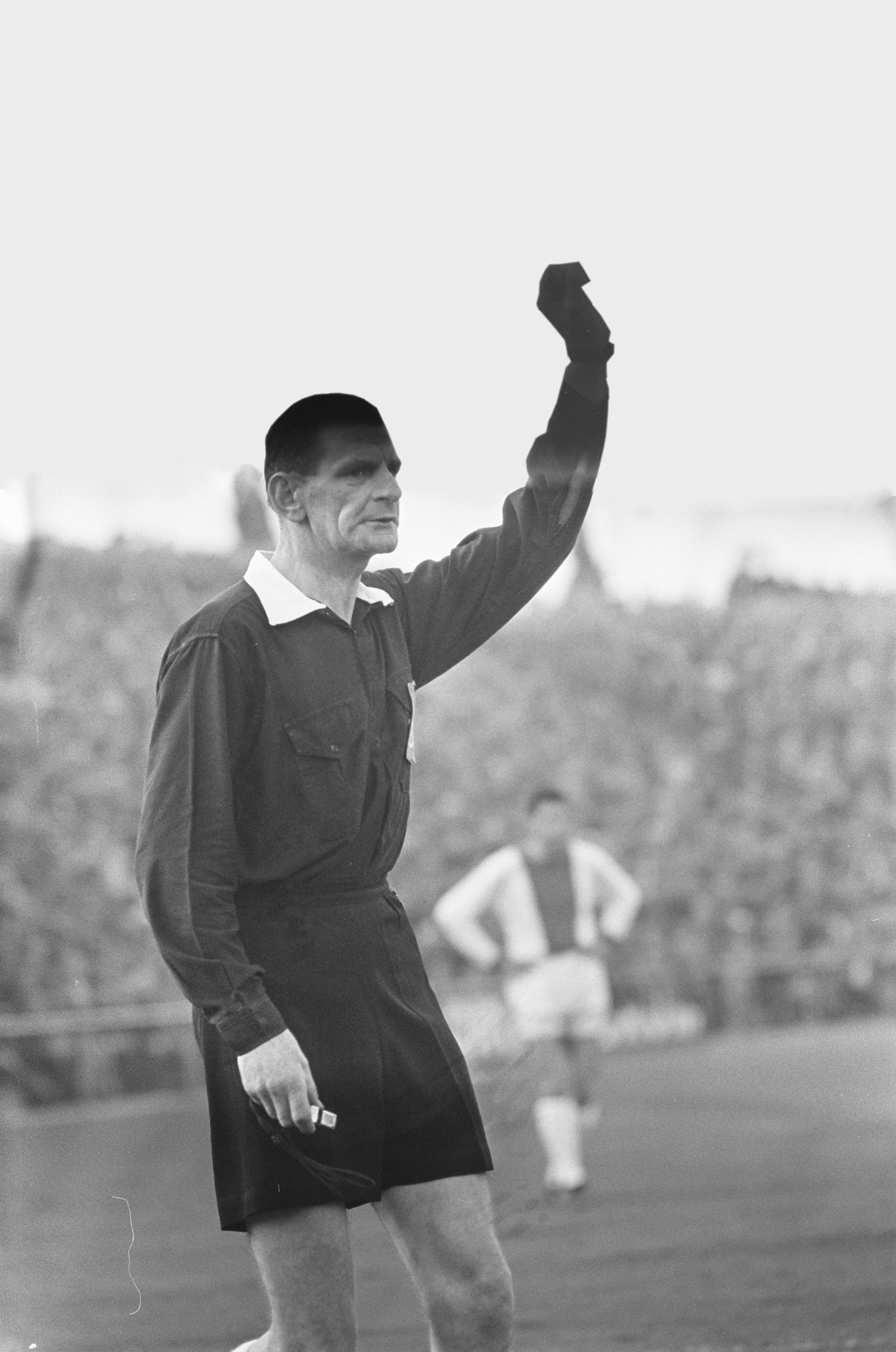

The Dutch Eredivisie in the 1966–67 season was contested by 18 teams. The number of participants was brought up from 16, so there were more promoted than relegated teams. AFC Ajax won the championship.

== Teams ==
A total of 18 teams are taking part in the league.

Location of teams in Eredivisie 1968–69

Club	Location
ADO Den Haag	The Hague
AFC Ajax	Amsterdam
DOS	Utrecht
DWS	Amsterdam
Elinkwijk	Utrecht
Feyenoord	Rotterdam
Fortuna '54	Sittard
Go Ahead	Deventer
GVAV	Groningen
MVV	Maastricht
NAC Breda	Breda
PSV Eindhoven	Eindhoven
Sittardia	Sittard
Sparta Rotterdam	Rotterdam
Telstar	IJmuiden
FC Twente	Enschede
Willem II	Tilburg
Xerxes	Rotterdam

== League standings ==
Pos	Team	Pld	W	D	L	GF	GA	GD	Pts	Qualification or relegation
1	AFC Ajax	34	26	4	4	122	34	+88	56	Qualified for 1967–68 European Cup
2	Feijenoord	34	21	9	4	81	33	+48	51	
3	Sparta Rotterdam	34	20	8	6	50	25	+25	48	
4	ADO Den Haag	34	18	10	6	70	40	+30	46	
5	Go Ahead	34	17	6	11	57	37	+20	40	
6	PSV Eindhoven	34	13	11	10	64	59	+5	37	
7	Sittardia	34	13	9	12	34	40	−6	35	
8	DWS	34	13	8	13	56	51	+5	34	Qualified for 1967–68 Inter-Cities Fairs Cup
9	GVAV	34	13	8	13	48	44	+4	34	
10	Xerxes	34	13	8	13	47	48	−1	34	
11	MVV Maastricht	34	9	12	13	43	59	−16	30	
12	NAC	34	10	9	15	44	50	−6	29	Qualified for 1967–68 European Cup Winners' Cup
13	FC Twente	34	9	11	14	47	62	−15	29	
14	Fortuna '54	34	8	9	17	44	66	−22	25	
15	DOS	34	10	5	19	50	83	−33	25	Qualified for 1967–68 Inter-Cities Fairs Cup
16	Telstar	34	8	8	18	44	68	−24	24	
17	Elinkwijk	34	7	8	19	35	84	−49	22	Relegated to Eerste Divisie
18	Willem II	34	2	9	23	27	80	−53	13	Relegated to Eerste Divisie

Source: rsssf.com

== Results ==
Home \ Away	ADO	AJA	DOS	DWA	ELI	FEY	F54	GOA	GVA	MVV	NAC	PSV	SIT	SPA	TEL	TWE	WIL	XER
ADO		2–0	6–1	1–0	6–1	1–1	2–0	1–1	3–0	0–0	4–3	3–2	1–2	2–1	2–1	2–1	6–1	0–1
Ajax	5–3		3–1	5–0	8–0	5–0	1–0	4–1	0–1	8–3	4–1	3–1	6–0	5–0	4–2	6–1	4–0	4–1
DOS	2–1	0–4		2–2	3–0	0–5	1–0	3–0	1–1	0–2	0–1	2–3	1–1	1–3	3–1	2–1	4–0	1–2
DWS/A	4–4	1–1	3–1		6–2	0–1	0–1	2–1	2–1	4–0	1–0	2–4	1–2	1–0	1–0	4–3	3–1	5–1
Elinkwijk	0–1	0–7	0–2	1–0		1–5	2–2	1–2	0–3	0–0	2–1	0–0	1–0	1–1	2–0	2–3	2–1	0–0
Feijenoord	1–1	1–1	4–2	3–2	4–0		3–0	2–1	3–0	5–0	1–1	4–2	1–0	2–1	3–1	5–1	5–1	3–2
Fortuna '54	1–3	2–3	0–3	4–0	2–0	2–6		1–1	3–2	1–1	1–3	2–3	1–0	1–2	1–3	0–2	1–1	4–1
Go Ahead	1–1	2–3	5–0	1–0	0–1	1–0	4–0		1–1	3–0	0–0	1–0	4–0	2–4	0–2	1–0	2–0	2–0
GVAV	0–0	3–8	4–1	0–0	4–1	1–4	1–2	1–3		5–0	1–0	4–0	2–0	0–0	2–0	0–0	3–0	2–1
MVV	2–2	2–4	3–0	0–0	1–1	1–0	1–1	0–2	2–0		4–1	2–3	3–0	0–1	3–1	1–2	2–2	1–1
NAC	0–2	0–1	4–1	4–4	4–3	0–0	2–2	2–4	2–0	2–0		3–0	0–1	1–1	0–2	2–0	1–0	1–0
PSV	1–1	2–1	2–3	2–1	8–2	2–2	2–2	0–1	1–0	2–2	3–3		1–2	1–0	4–1	2–2	4–1	0–0
Sittardia	1–0	1–1	3–0	1–1	1–1	1–0	1–2	2–1	1–0	1–2	2–0	0–0		0–1	4–1	2–0	1–1	1–3
Sparta	4–2	2–1	2–0	1–0	2–1	0–0	4–0	1–0	2–0	2–1	2–0	0–0	0–0		4–0	1–0	2–0	2–0
Telstar	2–4	0–3	2–2	0–0	3–2	0–2	2–0	3–3	0–0	1–1	1–1	1–1	2–0	2–0		4–4	3–1	0–2
FC Twente	0–2	1–1	7–4	0–2	2–2	1–1	2–2	1–3	1–1	1–2	1–0	1–4	1–1	1–1	1–0		1–1	2–1
Willem II	0–0	0–4	2–2	1–3	0–2	0–3	2–1	0–3	0–2	1–1	0–0	3–4	0–1	0–3	5–2	0–2		1–1
Xerxes	0–1	0–4	6–1	2–1	2–1	1–1	2–2	1–0	2–3	2–0	2–1	4–0	1–1	0–0	3–1	0–1	2–1	

Legend: Blue = home team win; Yellow = draw; Red = away team win.

== Attendances ==
#	Club	Average	Change
1	Feijenoord	33,500	−15.0
2	Ajax	22,588	−7.9
3	ADO	17,235	+3.2
4	Go Ahead	13,500	+3.8
5	Sparta	12,882	−16.0
6	DWS	10,618	−41.4
7	Sittardia	10,271	−0.7
8	GVAV	10,206	−7.2
9	DOS	9,924	−7.9
10	PSV	9,882	−9.9
11	Xerxes	9,294	+6.7
12	MVV	9,059	+5.7
13	Fortuna	8,853	+14.5
14	NAC	8,294	+7.0
15	Elinkwijk	8,062	−11.2
16	Telstar	7,824	−3.4
17	Twente	6,971	−13.1
18	Willem II	6,088	−33.8

== See also ==
- 1966–67 Eerste Divisie
- 1966–67 Tweede Divisie
