= FC Wageningen =

Former Dutch football club

- Full name: FC Wageningen
- Founded: 27 August 1911
- Dissolved: 30 June 1992
- Ground: Wageningse Berg; Wageningen
- Capacity: 6,800
- 1991–92: Eerste Divisie, 9th
Home colours

FC Wageningen (before 1978 Wageningen and WVV Wageningen) was a Dutch football club which was founded on 27 August 1911.^{,} The club played its matches in the Wageningse Berg stadium.

== History ==
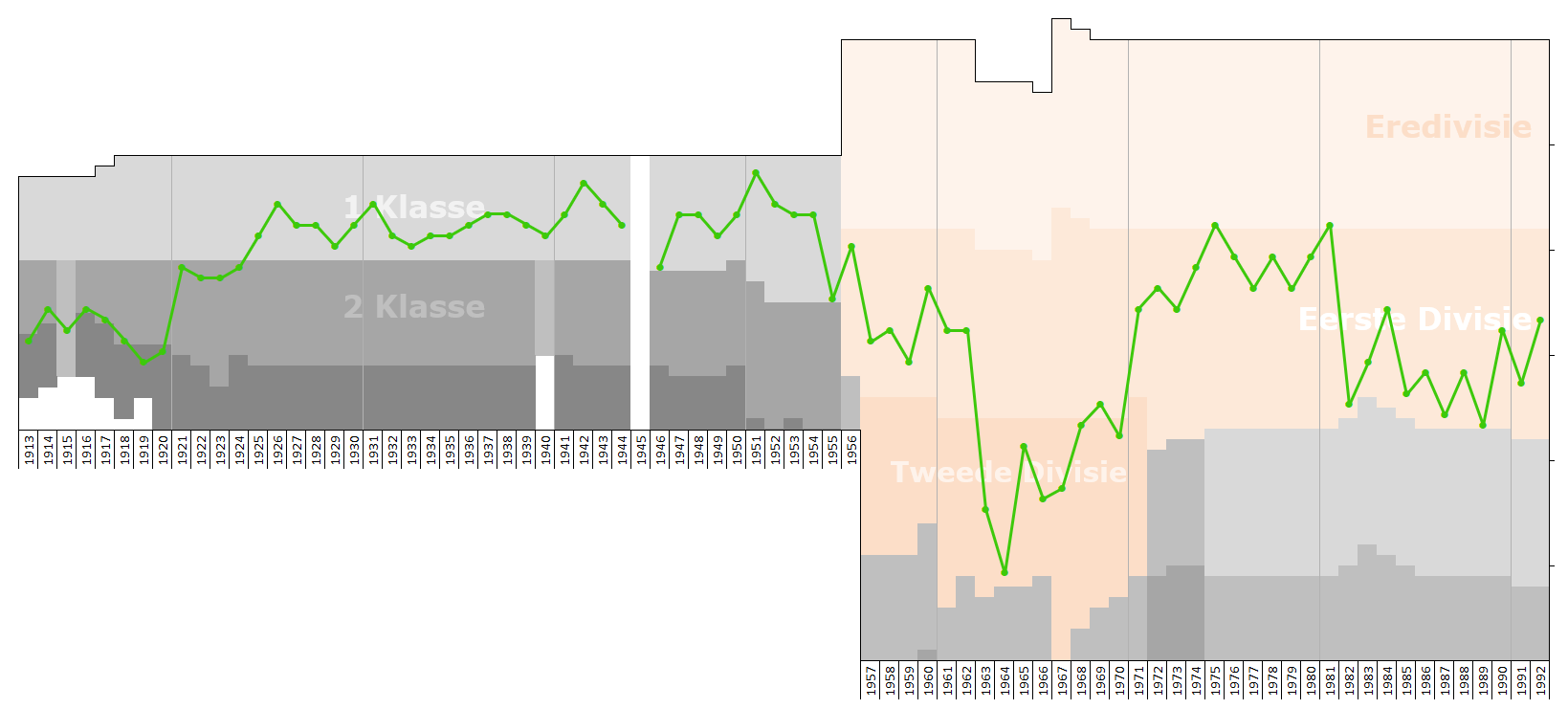
Historical chart of league performance

FC Wageningen spent most of its history in the Eerste Divisie. In 1974 the club wrote history by reaching the Eredivisie for the first time ever. FC Wageningen finished 18th in the clubs first Eredivisie season and as such were relegated back to the Eerste Divisie immediately. In 1980 the club would get promoted to the Eredivisie again but once again finished last place the following season and as a result were relegated back to the Eerste Divisie again.

FC Wageningen had the reputation of a true cup fighter. Its first success came on 18 June 1939, when the team won the KNVB Cup by defeating PSV Eindhoven (2–1 after extra-time) in Arnhem. Nine years later, on 19 June 1948, FC Wageningen once again won the Cup, this time by a win over DWV. After the introduction the club would reach the semi-finals another four times, three of which were as an Eerste Divisie club.

Financially the club had always struggled, partially because certain commercial developments were passed through too late. For example, the club was one of the final ones to found a business-club. It was a success but came too late to give the club financial security. Main sponsor Schoenenreus went bankrupt and left the club. Eventually the club managed to reduce the debts to 500,000 guilders. The municipality of Wageningen and the KNVB had no intention to give the club a helping hand. The club went bankrupt in 1992 and together with VCV Zeeland disappeared from the Eerste Divisie. FC Wageningen played its last match in professional football in May 1992 against NAC Breda. The amateur branch still exists as WVV Wageningen.

== Honours ==
- KNVB Cup: 2

1938–39, 1947–48

- Tweede Divisie: 1

1967–68

== Results 1963 – 1992 ==
						17		8	6	8	4	18	3	6	3	6	3	18	17	13	8	16	13	18	14	19	10	15	10
63	64	65	66	67	68	69	70	71	72	73	74	75	76	77	78	79	80	81	82	83	84	85	86	87	88	89	90	91	92	93
Eredivisie / Eerste divisie

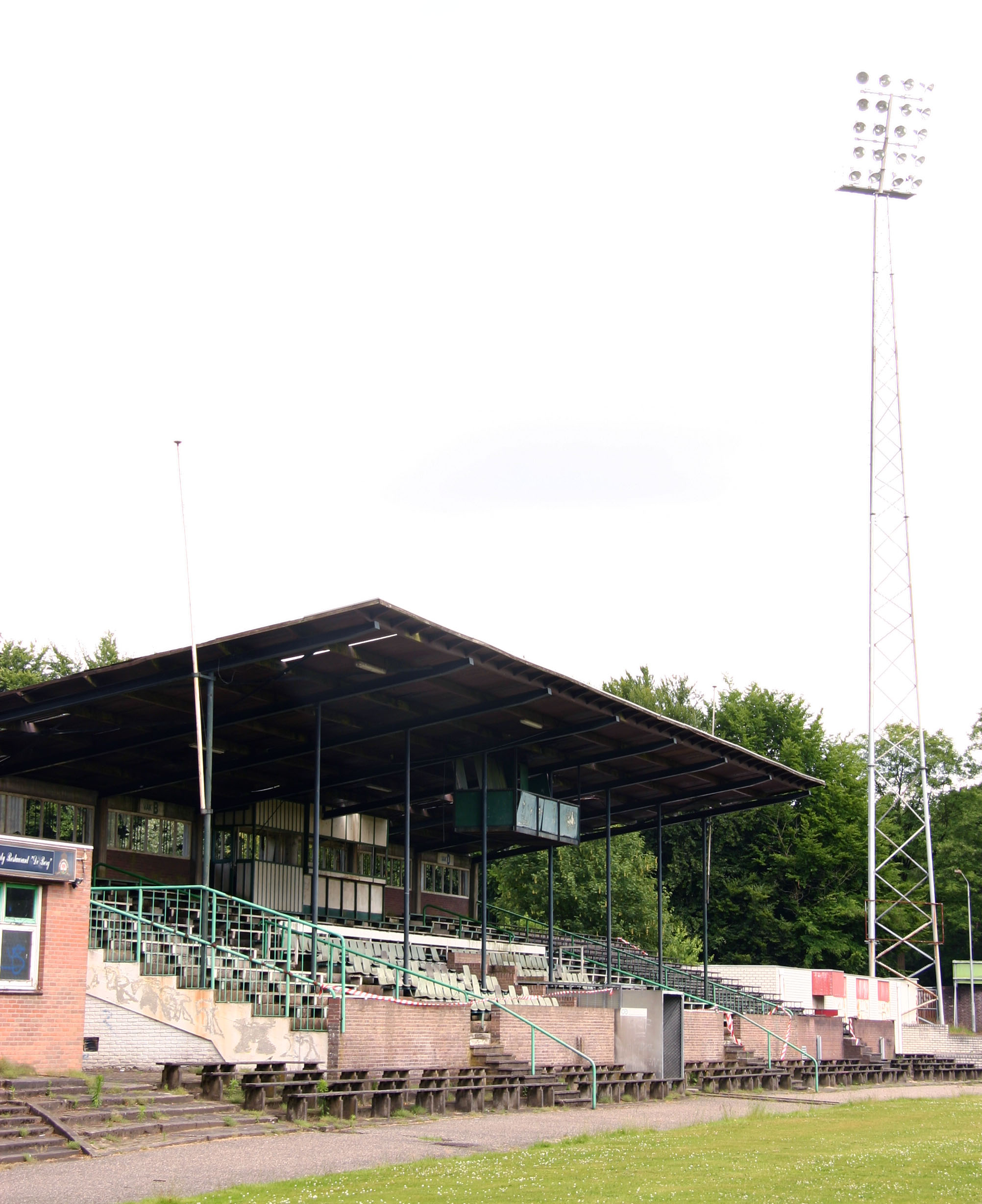
Stadium "De Wageningse berg"

== Former managers ==
- Jan Mastenbroek (1939–1960)
- Bas Paauwe (1964–1968)
- Maarten Vink (1968–1973)
- Fritz Korbach (1973–1977)
- Frans Körver (1977–1980)
- Nol de Ruiter (1980–1982)
- Jan Versleijen (1982–1984)
- Hans Boersma (1984–1985)
- Arie Schans (1985–1986)
- Piet Schrijvers (1987–1989)
- Piet Buter (1989–1991)
- Pim Verbeek (1991–1992)
- Willem van Hanegem assistant (1990–1991)
