= SV Limburgia =

Dutch sports club

Limburgia
- Full name: Sport Vereniging Limburgia
- Founded: 9 May 1920
- Dissolved: 30 June 1998
- Ground: Park Limburgia
- Capacity: 14.000
- Owner: Dutch State Coalmines
Home colours

Sport Vereniging Limburgia was a Dutch football/sports club from the city of Brunssum, Netherlands. It has been renamed BSV Limburgia.

== History ==
SV Limburgia was founded on 9 May 1920 by the Limburgian coal mines, under the name Rhenania. In 1927 the club moved to Park Limburgia situated along the Venweg and was renamed Sportvereniging Staatsmijn Hendrik (Sportsclub Coalmine Hendrik). On 14 July 1936, during a general assembly, the name was changed to Limburgia.

Between 1925 and 1939 Limburgia played in the second (regional) division. After the 1939–1940 they were promoted to the first (regional) division only to be relegated after one season. In the 1943–1944 season they promoted again to the first (regional) division and stayed there. Finally in 1945–1946 Limburgia won the first (regional) division and were allowed to compete for the Dutch championship. Unfortunately they finished sixth and thus last. The 1949–50 season proved to be the most successful. After winning the regional first division, they were again allowed to compete in for the national championship. The championship was to be decided between Limburgia and Blauw Wit. On the last match day Limburgia was leading by one point, and thus a win would secure their first ever national championship. Their final game was played on 24 June 1950 against Ajax in the Olympic Stadium in Amsterdam. Limburgia won this game with 6–0 and thus secured the Dutch national championship.

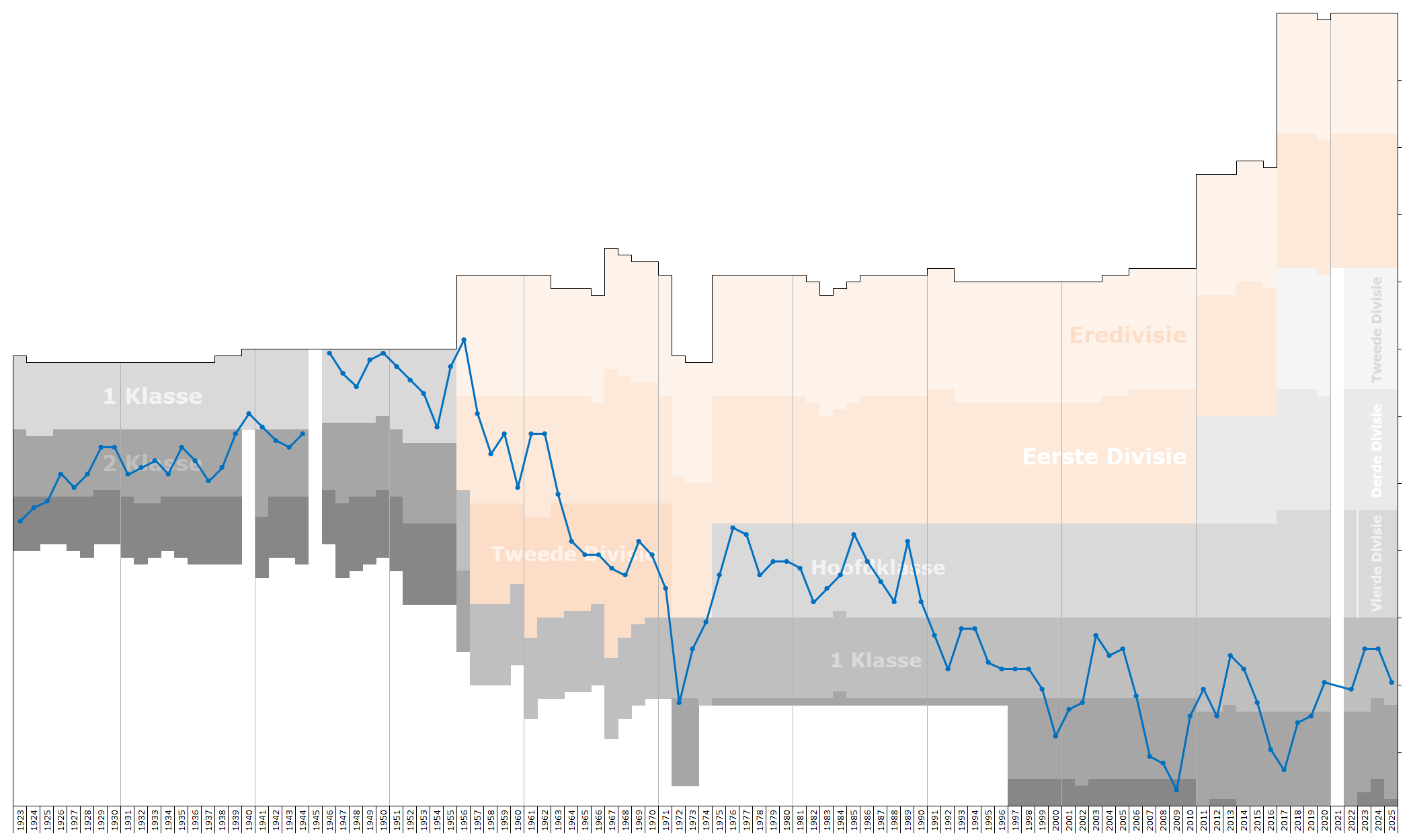
Chart of end-season table rankings of SV Limburgia

The final results of the 1949–50 season:

Pos	Team	Pld	W	D	L	GF	GA	GD	Pts
1.	SV Limburgia	10	7	1	2	39	18	+21	15
2.	Blauw Wit	10	6	2	2	36	23	+13	14
3.	Maurits	10	4	2	4	16	22	−6	10
4.	Ajax	10	4	0	6	21	22	−1	8
5.	Heerenveen	10	3	2	5	22	34	−12	8
6.	Enschedese Boys	10	2	1	7	10	25	−15	5

After the introduction of professional football in the Netherlands, Limburgia's fame declined. In 1963 they relegated to the Tweede Divisie (3rd division). In 1971 they were relegated to the amateurs and finally in 1998 Limburgia merged with RKBSV to form BSV Limburgia. They still play in the amateur leagues.
