= XerxesDZB =

Dutch football club

- Full name: XerxesDZB Rotterdam
- Nickname: Zebras
- Founded: 1904; 122 years ago
- Ground: Sportpark Faas Wilkes
- Capacity: 3,500
- Chairman: Ronald Broeders
- Manager: Winand van Loon
- League: Vierde Divisie (2024–25)
Home colours	Away colours

XerxesDZB is a Dutch football club based in Rotterdam.

== History ==
The club was founded in 1904 as RFC Xerxes and their first regional championship was won in 1907. After a second championship in 1911 the club was promoted to the second class (tweede klasse) of Dutch football. In 1925 Xerxes reached the Cup-final, they lost the final with 5-1 from ZFC. In 1931 Xerxes became champions of their district and were promoted to the first class (eerste klasse) where they faced teams like Feijenoord, Sparta, ADO, Ajax and Blauw Wit.

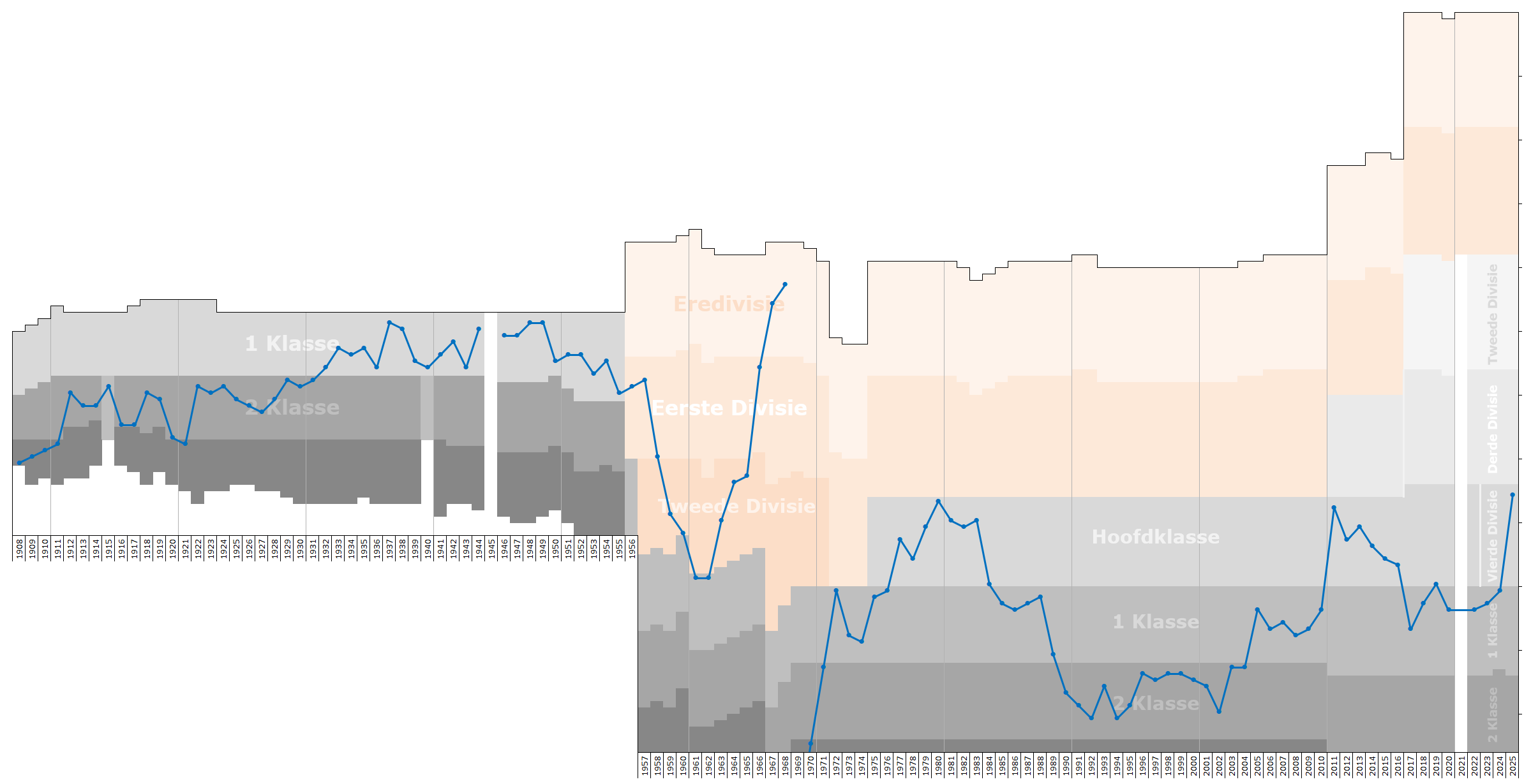
Historical chart of league performance

While playing at the highest level of Dutch football Xerxes was easily able to remain in their division with players like Wim Lagendaal, and in later years Faas Wilkes and Coen Moulijn and play alongside the giant teams in the country, also during the first years of professional football in the country. However, after 1958 the results became worse and in 1960 Xerxes was forced relegated out of the professional football divisions. Two consecutive seasons (1961 and 1962) Xerxes became champion of the amateurs and was returned to professional football for the 1962–63 season.

Times changed and Xerxes promoted to the Eerste Divisie in 1965, followed by another promotion in 1966 to the Eredivisie. At this level Xerxes was again able to achieve decent results with players like Willem van Hanegem, Hans Dorjee, Rob Jacobs and Eddy Treytel. However the lack of their own stadium (a hospital was built on their ground) and withdrawal of the sponsor forced the pro-section of Xerxes to merge with the pro-section DHC Delft during the summer of 1967 to become Xerxex/DHC'66. That club was dissolved already a year later by lack of interest by the fans in Delft.

The amateurs of Xerxes would begin in the fourth class of Dutch football league system in 1967 and win the championship of each tier up the league ladder that the fourth successive championship was won in the first class in 1972. In 1974 the Hoofdklasse (a level above the first class) was introduced, but Xerxers failed to qualify. In 1976 achieving a successive championship in the first class got them promoted to the Hoofdklasse. In 1980 they were champions of the Hoofdklasse A and then began working up the championship of that ladder by beating the Hoofdklasse B and the Hoofdklasse C champions in separate competitions to reach the pinnacle of amateur champions of the Netherlands.

In the last part of the 1990s Xerxes came into financial trouble, and confronted with the fact that they had to leave their grounds again (this time for a railway) and was forced to merge with DZB Zevenkamp resulting in their current name XerxesDZB from 1 July 2000. A big success in the past season when the club (Saturday) promoted to the Hoofdklasse. This is the second amateur level in the Netherlands. The Sunday part of the club is currently playing in the 4rd class level due to a forced relegation by the KNVB. The biggest success of the Sunday part reached the KNVB-Cup in 2008/2009. After six seasons in the Hoofdklasse Xerxes was contracted back to the first class.

== Former players ==
=== National team players ===
The following players were called up to represent their national teams in international football and received caps during their tenure with Xerxes:

- Netherlands
- (Netherlands) Wim Lagendaal (1929–1935)
- (Netherlands) Faas Wilkes (1941–1949; 1962–1964)
  Sint Maarten
- (Sint Maarten) **Sergio Hughes (2024–present)**

- Players in bold actively play for Xerxes and for their respective national teams. Years in brackets indicate careerspan with Xerxes.

== Players in international tournaments ==
The following is a list of Xerxes players who have competed in international tournaments, including the FIFA World Cup.

Cup	Players
(Italy) 1934 FIFA World Cup	(Netherlands) Wim Lagendaal

== Managers ==
- Ignác Molnár (1936–1939)
- Friedrich Donnenfeld (1953–55)
- Jan van Buijtenen (1956–57)
- Toon van der Enden (??)
- Jan Bens (1960–62)
- Jiří Hanke (1962–63)
- Bob Janse (1963–66)
- Kurt Linder (1966–68)
- Pim Visser (1971–74)
- Hans Dorjee (1974–76)
- Sándor Popovics (1976–77)
- Bep van der Heyden (1977–??)
