= Jan Reker =

Dutch footballer and manager

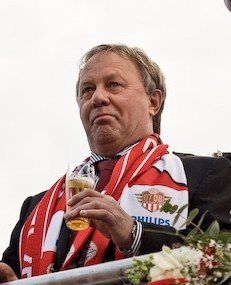

Personal information
- Date of birth: 3 June 1948 (age 78)
- Place of birth: Eindhoven, Netherlands

Youth career
- Years: Team
- LEW
- FC Eindhoven

Managerial career
- 1980: PSV Eindhoven (caretaker)
- 1983–1986: PSV Eindhoven
- 1986–1988: VVV-Venlo
- 1988–1991: Roda JC
- 1991–1995: Willem II
- 1995: MVV

Jan Reker (Dutch pronunciation: [ˈjɑn ˈreːkər], born 3 June 1948) is a Dutch football manager and director.

Reker started his coaching career in the Willem II and PSV Eindhoven youth ranks, which was followed up by the assistant manager role at VVV-Venlo and PSV. After half a season as caretaker in 1980, Reker officially served as manager of PSV between 1983 and 1986, winning the Eredivisie title in his last year. He also coached VVV, Roda JC, Willem II and lastly MVV Maastricht.

In 1996, Reker became chairman of the Dutch Association of Professional Football Coaches. In 2007, he was appointed general manager at PSV. Reker faced the Eredivisie title win in his first year, but subsequent poor performances in later years. Ronald Koeman and Huub Stevens resigned, and an internal struggle ensued between Reker and other staff, including a public dispute between him and goalkeeper Gomes. Fan criticism towards Reker reached a peak in early 2009 after a disappointing season. A year later, a dispute between him and the PSV board led to his departure.

== Early life ==
Reker was born in the Strijp area in Eindhoven; his father worked as a greengrocer. He played youth football at amateur club LEW and FC Eindhoven. Reker was educated in sport management and earned a degree as a commando during his conscription. He never played professional football; after his military service he committed himself to football coaching.

== Managerial career ==
In 1969, Reker became youth coach at Willem II. Later, he also served as youth coach and academy director at PSV Eindhoven. In 1977, Reker moved to VVV-Venlo to become assistant manager. After three years, he returned to PSV to serve as assistant manager under Kees Rijvers. When Rijvers was sacked in January 1980, Reker was chosen as caretaker manager for the remainder of the season. After Thijs Libregts was appointed as the new PSV manager in 1981, Reker returned to his assistant position. Libregts left in 1983 and PSV subsequently chose Reker as the new coach. He brought in Guus Hiddink as an assistant manager from De Graafschap, but success remained absent in 1984 and 1985. It prompted PSV to choose Hans Kraay as director of football and a batch of new players like Ruud Gullit and Eric Gerets. With Kraay, Reker and Hiddink, PSV secured the Eredivisie title in the 1985-86 season.

In 1986, Reker returned to VVV-Venlo as director of football and manager. With Sef Vergoossen as coach, they reached the fifth place in the Eredivisie twice. After two years, he left for Roda JC as the successor of Rob Jacobs. Reker appointed Willy van der Kuijlen as his assistant. In the 1988-89 season, Roda JC reached the fifth place in the Eredivisie, narrowly missing out on European qualification. The team reached the UEFA Cup third round, where it was eliminated by Sredets Sofia after penalties (4-4 on aggregate). After the first (away) match against Sofia, Reker was suspended for two matches by UEFA after claiming that Reker had provoked the home crowd. Things improved in the 1989-90 season, when Roda JC claimed the first spot in the Eredivisie after ten league rounds, and were second at the winter break. Reker also signed a new five-year contract. Eventually, Roda JC qualified for European football. In Reker's third season, Roda suffered an early elimination in the UEFA Cup against AS Monaco. After disappointing league performances, the relationship between Reker and chairman Nol Hendriks deteriorated. Even though Roda JC finished tenth in the Eredivisie and reached the KNVB Cup semi-finals, Reker decided to resign at the end of the season.

In October 1991, Reker succeeded Piet de Visser as coach of Willem II. During his three-year period at the club, he finished 12th, 10th and eighth in the league. In January 1995, Reker announced he would leave Willem II at the end of the season. But after the team lost a match against FC Dordrecht (3-0) in March, Reker decided to quit immediately. At that point, he had signed a three-year contract with MVV to become their manager in July 1995. In Maastricht, he replaced Sef Vergoossen who in turn became MVV's director of football. But when MVV were facing relegation in May, Vergoossen decided to quit early, forcing Reker to step in for the remaining matches. He could not prevent MVV from relegation, and the team had to play in the Eerste Divisie for the 1995–96 season. After a dismal start of the league, with MVV in last place after nine matches, Reker was sacked in October. It turned out to be Reker's last job as head coach; after suffering a back injury during a renovation of his house, he had trouble standing for long periods, denying him any future coaching jobs.

== Board positions ==
In 1990, Reker founded the Coaches Betaald Voetbal (Association of Professional Football Coaches). He started out as the treasurer of the organization, but was appointed as the director in 1996. Being in charge of CBV, Reker faced a few problems with its members. In 1999, Reker expelled Co Adriaanse after he had insulted Frank Rijkaard in an interview. Two years later, Aad de Mos was also excluded after an interview - this time for ridiculing Louis van Gaal (one of the CBV founders). In 2007, it was Van Gaal himself who separated from the CBV, after his critique on Marco van Basten was met with a reprimand from Reker.

In July 2007, Reker left his job at CBV to become general manager of PSV Eindhoven. He succeeded chairman Frits Schuitema. PSV chose to abolish the position of the chairman and replaced it with a board of directors and a general manager, so Reker was the first man with this title. PSV started the 2007–08 season by spending €15,4 million on Danny Koevermans, Danko Lazović and Balázs Dzsudzsák, while selling Arouna Koné for €12 million. In September, PSV were ejected from the KNVB Cup by the football association after fielding a suspended Manuel da Costa in the match against Jong SC Heerenveen. Reker called the error an “inexcusable blunder” and started an investigation on the matter. In October, Reker had to let coach Ronald Koeman go to Valencia, after receiving an offer from Spain and Koeman himself eager to accept it. After asking Jan Wouters to fill in for the first few matches, Reker brought Sef Vergoossen in as caretaker manager, with Dwight Lodeweges as his assistant. Vergoossen was chosen after Martin Jol and Fred Rutten rejected the offer. Eventually, PSV won the Eredivisie title in 2008, played Champions League and reached the UEFA Cup quarter-finals, leading up to a 29.4 million euros net profit in the 2007–08 season.

Behind the scenes, Reker faced a power struggle with several people; most notably player agent Vlado Lemić. He had close ties with director of football Stan Valckx, scout Piet de Visser, former coaches Guus Hiddink and Koeman, and players including Gomes. The PSV staff would profit from his extensive network – the club signed players like Mateja Kežman and Alex through him, among others. Lemic's growing influence and questionable financial compensations received resistance from the PSV directors. After Reker's arrival, he attempted to minimize Lemic's power, which was not appreciated by Lemic and his allies. After the 2008 league title, Gomes spoke out against Reker in an interview. Citing a lack of trust, Gomes issues an ultimatum: either Reker leaves, or he will leave himself. Valckx calls Reker negligent and De Visser resigned, claiming that he could not handle Reker's unreliability anymore. Reker, backed by the board of directors, proceeded to sack Valckx and deny Lemic entry to the PSV premises. Gomes, immensely popular with fans, was sold to Tottenham Hotspur.

Meanwhile, Reker also faced criticism from goalkeeper coach Joop Hiele, who was forced to leave PSV after Huub Stevens was appointed as the new manager, and Erwin Koeman, who expected to be offered the role of assistant manager – to no avail. During the 2008 summer transfer period, PSV sold Jefferson Farfán and Gomes for €19 million, and in return bought Ola Toivonen, Stef Nijland, Andreas Isaksson and Erik Pieters for €13,3 million. With Stevens, the 2008–09 season started disastrously, facing early Champions League and KNVB Cup eliminations and a fourth league spot at the winter break. Both Reker and Stevens faced heavy protests from the PSV fan base, who demanded their resignation, but the board of directors kept their faith in Reker. In January, Stevens resigned though and Reker appointed Lodeweges as caretaker manager for the remainder of the season. With Lodeweges, PSV finished fourth in the league, missing out on Champions League football and its financial benefits.

In April 2009, Reker signed Fred Rutten as the new head coach of PSV. He was handed a three-year contract. During the summer, Orlando Engelaar and Stanislav Manolev were transferred to PSV (for €7,1 million), while Lazović was sold for €5 million. On Christmas Eve 2009, Reker announced his departure as general manager. Even though the PSV board of directors asked Reker to extend his contract, he refused and decided to leave PSV when his contract ended in July 2010. Reker was angered by the board after they did not consult him about releasing commercial director Marcel van den Bunder. Reker: “I have decided not to extend my contract with PSV in solidarity with a displaced colleague. Principles matter more to me than money.”

== Managing statistics ==
Team	From	To
PSV Eindhoven	January 1980	June 1980
PSV Eindhoven	July 1983	June 1986
VVV-Venlo	July 1986	June 1988
Roda JC	July 1988	June 1991
Willem II	October 1991	March 1995
MVV Maastricht	May 1995	October 1995

== Honours ==
=== Managerial ===
PSV Eindhoven

- Eredivisie (1): 1985-86
