= Coen Dillen =

Dutch footballer (1926–1990)

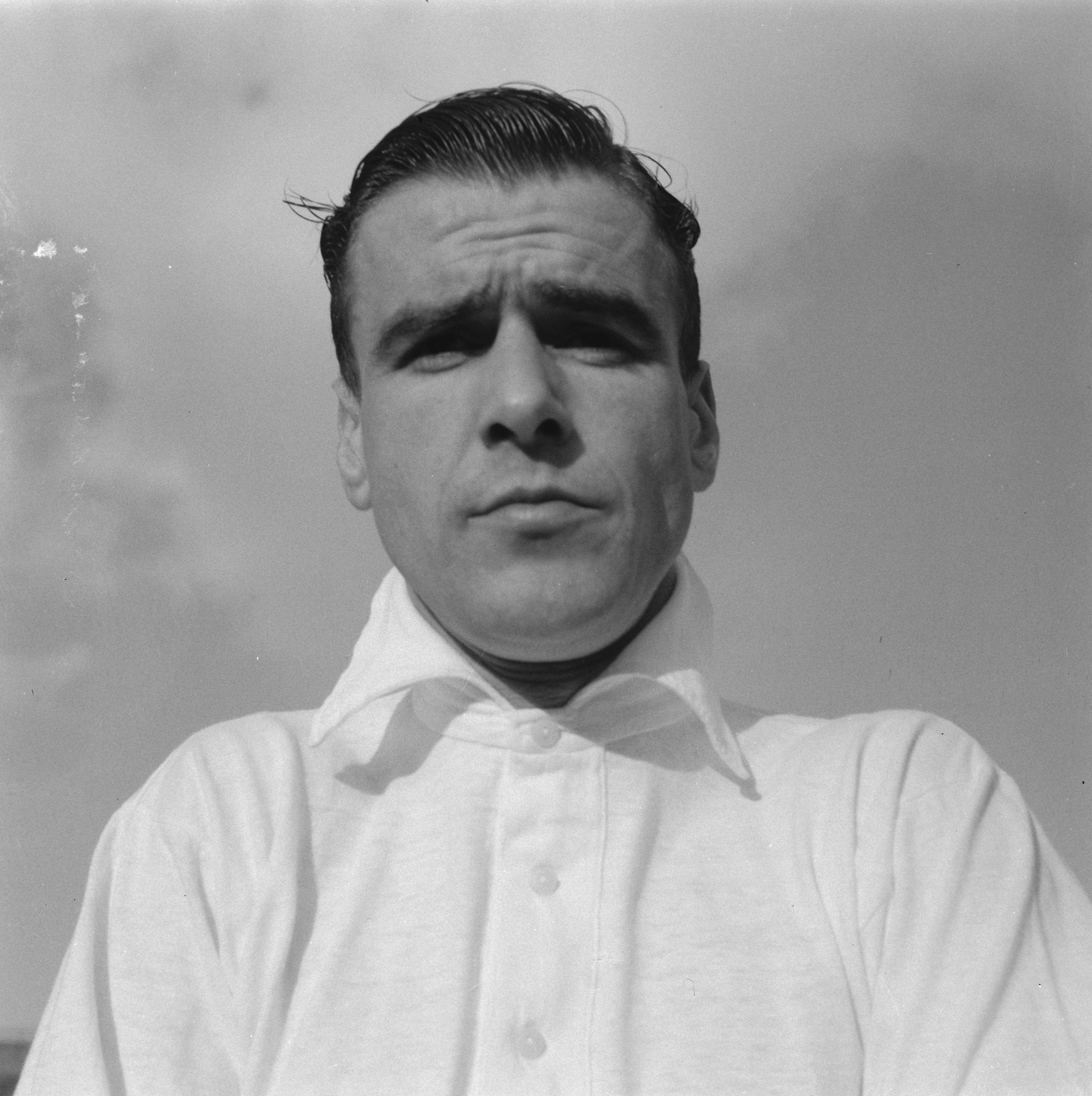

Personal information
- Full name: Coenraad Henrik Dillen
- Date of birth: 5 October 1926
- Place of birth: Strijp, Netherlands
- Date of death: 24 July 1990 (aged 63)
- Place of death: Goes, Netherlands
- Position: Striker

Youth career
- 1937–1941: Brabantia

Senior career*
Years	Team	Apps	(Gls)
1941–1945	PSV	0	(0)
1945–1949	Brabantia		
1949–1961	PSV	328	(287)
1961–1963	Helmondia '55	48	(29)

International career
1954–1957	Netherlands	5	(4)

Managerial career
- 1964–1966: Nuenen
- * Club domestic league appearances and goals

Coenraad Henrik Dillen (5 October 1926 – 24 July 1990) was a Dutch footballer who primarily played for PSV as well as the Netherlands national side. He holds the record of most goals scored in an Eredivisie season.

== Club career ==
Dillen started his senior career at PSV, but returned to childhood club Brabantia, before joining PSV once more for a prolific period. Nicknamed Het Kanon (the cannon), his goal tally of 43 in the inaugural 1956/57 Eredivisie season remains the highest score by an individual in the Eredivisie. He scored twenty goals in a nine-match period between 27 January and 31 March 1957. He finished his career at Helmondia '55.

== International career ==
Dillen made his debut for the Netherlands in a May 1954 friendly match against Switzerland and earned a total of 5 caps, scoring 4 goals. His final international was a March 1957 FIFA World Cup qualification match against Luxembourg.

== Personal life ==
After retiring from playing he spent a two-year spell as manager of amateur side RKSV Nuenen. His brother Cor Dillen was a director and CFO for Philips. Coen himself also worked as a calculator for Philips.

He died in 1990 of a heart-attack in Zeeland, aged 63. In 2003, a statue was erected in his honour at the PSV stadium. His wife Mien continued to work in their cigarette store after his death.
