= 1928–29 Netherlands Football League Championship =

Netherl. Football Championship
- Season: 1928–1929
- Champions: PSV Eindhoven (1st title)

The Netherlands Football League Championship 1928–1929 was contested by 50 teams participating in five divisions. The national champion would be determined by a play-off featuring the winners of the eastern, northern, southern and two western football divisions of the Netherlands. PSV Eindhoven won this year's championship by beating Go Ahead, Feijenoord, Sparta Rotterdam and Velocitas 1897.

== New entrants ==
Eerste Klasse East:

- Promoted from 2nd Division: HVV Tubantia

Eerste Klasse North:

- Promoted from 2nd Division: WVV Winschoten

Eerste Klasse West-I:

- Moving in from West-II: ADO Den Haag, Koninklijke HFC, Sparta Rotterdam and Stormvogels
- Promoted from 2nd Division: Hermes DVS

Eerste Klasse West-II:

- Moving in from West-I: DFC, HFC EDO, SBV Excelsior and HBS Craeyenhout
- Promoted from 2nd Division: VSV

== Divisions ==
=== Eerste Klasse East ===
Pos	Team	Pld	W	D	L	GF	GA	GD	Pts	Qualification or relegation
1	Go Ahead	18	14	2	2	64	21	+43	30	Qualified for Championship play-off
2	ZAC	18	14	0	4	55	26	+29	28	
3	AGOVV Apeldoorn	18	11	2	5	46	34	+12	24	
4	SC Enschede	18	10	1	7	44	39	+5	21	
5	Heracles	18	7	3	8	46	40	+6	17	
6	Vitesse Arnhem	18	5	3	10	38	53	−15	13	
7	HVV Tubantia	18	6	1	11	34	51	−17	13	
8	Robur et Velocitas	18	4	4	10	31	53	−22	12	
9	FC Wageningen	18	5	1	12	32	54	−22	11	
10	Enschedese Boys	18	4	3	11	31	50	−19	11	Relegated to 2nd Division

Source: rsssf.com

=== Eerste Klasse North ===
Pos	Team	Pld	W	D	L	GF	GA	GD	Pts	Qualification or relegation
1	Velocitas 1897	18	11	5	2	53	25	+28	27	Qualified for Championship play-off
2	VV Leeuwarden	18	10	4	4	49	45	+4	24	
3	Be Quick 1887	18	10	2	6	54	38	+16	22	
4	MVV Alcides	18	8	3	7	45	40	+5	19	
5	Achilles 1894	17	8	2	7	34	31	+3	18	
6	Veendam	18	6	5	7	42	32	+10	17	
7	WVV Winschoten	18	7	2	9	37	44	−7	16	
8	GVAV Rapiditas	17	6	2	9	37	48	−11	14	
9	LVV Friesland	18	4	3	11	32	44	−12	11	
10	GVV Groningen	18	4	2	12	31	67	−36	10	Relegated to 2nd Division

Source: rsssf.com

=== Eerste Klasse South ===
Pos	Team	Pld	W	D	L	GF	GA	GD	Pts	Qualification
1	PSV Eindhoven	18	14	3	1	60	22	+38	31	Qualified for Championship play-off
2	Willem II	18	9	5	4	55	35	+20	23	
3	MVV Maastricht	18	9	1	8	41	35	+6	19	
4	NAC	18	9	1	8	48	56	−8	19	
5	FC Eindhoven	18	7	3	8	31	33	−2	17	
6	NOAD	18	7	1	10	38	41	−3	15	
7	RFC Roermond	18	5	5	8	38	43	−5	15	
8	LONGA	18	6	3	9	38	46	−8	15	
9	BVV Den Bosch	18	5	3	10	33	49	−16	13	
10	RKVV Wilhelmina	18	5	3	10	30	52	−22	13	

Source: rsssf.com

=== Eerste Klasse West-I ===
Pos	Team	Pld	W	D	L	GF	GA	GD	Pts	Qualification or relegation
1	Sparta Rotterdam	18	11	3	4	57	32	+25	25	Qualified for Championship play-off
2	ADO Den Haag	18	11	2	5	46	30	+16	24	
3	RCH	18	10	1	7	40	41	−1	21	
4	Koninklijke HFC	18	8	4	6	42	33	+9	20	Division West-II next season
5	VUC	18	8	4	6	51	47	+4	20	Division West-II next season
6	Hermes DVS	18	8	4	6	47	48	−1	20	
7	FC Hilversum	18	8	2	8	44	48	−4	18	
8	AFC Ajax	18	6	2	10	36	39	−3	14	
9	Stormvogels	18	4	2	12	28	42	−14	10	Division West-II next season
10	UVV Utrecht	18	3	2	13	36	67	−31	8	Relegated to 2nd Division.

Source: rsssf.com

=== Eerste Klasse West-II ===
Pos	Team	Pld	W	D	L	GF	GA	GD	Pts	Qualification
1	Feijenoord	18	13	2	3	60	36	+24	28	Qualified for Championship play-off
2	HBS Craeyenhout	18	9	4	5	41	30	+11	22	
3	Blauw-Wit Amsterdam	18	9	3	6	41	36	+5	21	
4	VSV	18	6	6	6	33	34	−1	18	Division West-I next season
5	HVV Den Haag	18	7	3	8	44	44	0	17	
6	DFC	18	8	1	9	42	47	−5	17	Division West-I next season
7	HFC EDO	18	7	2	9	42	36	+6	16	
8	ZFC	18	6	3	9	39	43	−4	15	
9	HVV 't Gooi	18	7	1	10	38	43	−5	15	
10	Excelsior	18	4	3	11	30	61	−31	11	Division West-I next season

Source: rsssf.com

=== Championship play-off ===
Pos	Team	Pld	W	D	L	GF	GA	GD	Pts	PSV	GOA	FEY	SPA	VEL
1	PSV Eindhoven	8	6	0	2	27	11	+16	12		2–1	4–0	1–2	5–1
2	Go Ahead	8	5	0	3	21	12	+9	10	1–3		2–1	2–1	7–0
3	Feijenoord	8	4	0	4	14	11	+3	8	3–0	3–2		0–1	1–2
4	Sparta Rotterdam	8	3	1	4	11	13	−2	7	2–3	2–4	0–2		0–0
5	Velocitas 1897	8	1	1	6	5	31	−26	3	1–9	0–2	0–4	1–3	

Source: rsssf.com
