= PSV Eindhoven =

Sports club from Eindhoven, the Netherlands

Coordinates: 51°26′29″N 5°28′03″E

PSV
- Full name: Philips Sport Vereniging NV
- Nicknames: Boeren (Farmers); Lampen (Lightbulbs); Rood-witten (Red-and-whites)
- Short name: PSV
- Founded: 31 August 1913; 113 years ago
- Stadium: Philips Stadion
- Capacity: 35,000
- Chairman: Robert van der Wallen
- Head coach: Peter Bosz
- League: Eredivisie
- 2025–26: Eredivisie, 1st of 18 (champions)
- Website: psv.nl
Home colours	Away colours	Third colours

Philips Sport Vereniging (Dutch pronunciation: [ˈfilɪps ˌspɔrt fərˈeːnəɣɪŋ]; (Note: In isolation, Philips and Vereniging are pronounced Dutch pronunciation: [ˈfilɪps] and [vərˈeːnəɣɪŋ], respectively.) English: Philips Sports Society), abbreviated as PSV and internationally known as PSV Eindhoven (pronounced [ˌpeːjɛsˈfeː ˈʔɛintˌɦoːvə(n)]), (Note: Eindhoven in isolation: [ˈɛintˌɦoːvə(n)].) is a Dutch sports club from Eindhoven, Netherlands. It is best known for its professional football department, which has played in the Eredivisie, the top tier in Dutch football, since its inception in 1956. Along with Ajax and Feyenoord, PSV is one of the country's "big three" clubs that have dominated the Eredivisie.

The club was founded in 1913 as a team for Philips employees. PSV's history contains two golden eras revolving around the UEFA Cup victory in 1978 and the 1987–88 European Cup victory as part of the seasonal treble in 1988. The team has won the Eredivisie 27 times, the KNVB Cup 11 times and the Johan Cruyff Shield a record 15 times. Currently (as of January 2026), PSV is ranked 18th on the UEFA club coefficients ranking. Throughout the years, PSV has developed a reputation as a stepping stone for players who later achieved success at major European clubs or on the international stage, including: Ruud Gullit, Ronald Koeman, Romário, Ronaldo, Phillip Cocu, Boudewijn Zenden, Jaap Stam, Ruud van Nistelrooy, Arjen Robben, Denzel Dumfries, Mark van Bommel, Park Ji-sung, Georginio Wijnaldum, Memphis Depay, and Cody Gakpo.

Since its foundation, it has played in the Philips Stadion and has upheld its club colours (red and white). Its elaborate connection with Philips can be witnessed in its sponsoring, shared technology and board member ties. Fans have named themselves 'boeren' (Dutch pronunciation: [ˈbuːrə(n)], Dutch for either peasants or farmers), taking pride in Eindhoven's status of being a provincial city and their Brabantian heritage.

== History ==
=== Foundation and first decades (1913–1962) ===
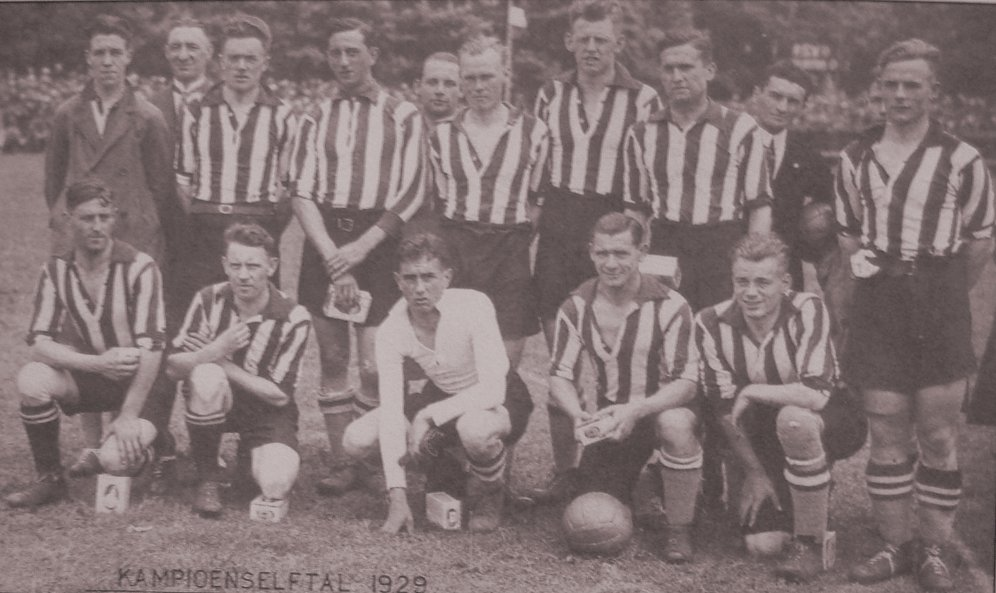
PSV's first league-winning team in 1929

To serve the need for activities with Philips employees, the company founded its own football team in 1910: the Philips Elftal. Its ground was the Philips Sportpark, located on the same location as the present day stadium. Financial turmoil and worker strikes led to a quick demise of the team and in 1913, its successor emerged, Philips Sport Vereniging, founded on 31 August. It was the day that Philips organized celebrations and sports competitions in light of the centennial of the defeat of the French in the Napoleonic Wars. It was not until 1916, however, that the football department switched its name from Philips Elftal to PSV. Because of World War I, the first possibility to enter a league was in the 1915–16 season. The club's first ever match was a 3–2 defeat against Willem II Reserves on 19 September 1915. The team did achieve promotion that season to a newly created Third Division of the Brabantian FA. Under the guidance of coach Wout Buitenweg, PSV were promoted in 1918 and 1921 as well, eventually reaching the Eerste Klasse. The team was relegated in 1925, but its stint in the Second Division only lasted one year when PSV were promoted again. Since 1926, PSV has always played in the highest possible domestic league.

That year, defender Sjef van Run was brought in and a year later Jan van den Broek joined PSV, two players that would shape the squad in the coming years. Behind the scenes, Frans Otten became chairman of the entire PSV sports union. He was responsible for bringing the club to a new level with new accommodations and stadium expansions. After winning the district league in 1929, PSV entered the championship play-offs. In that competition, it won six out of eight matches. A 5–1 win against Velocitas from the city of Groningen meant that PSV was crowned league champions for the first time. In the following three years, PSV won the district league every year, but it could not win the play-offs until 1935. In that year, the team secured the second championship ever in a 2–1 victory against DWS.

Due to World War II, attendances decreased significantly and in 1940, PSV player Johan Brusselers died in combat. After the war, PSV signed two new strikers: Piet Fransen in 1948 and Coen Dillen in 1949. In 1950, PSV got its first post-war success when the team defeated HFC Haarlem in the KNVB Cup final; the match ended in 4–3 after extra time. A year later, PSV won the district title after EVV failed to win their final match. Even though coach Sam Wadsworth resigned during the championship play-offs, the title was won after a 2–1 win over Willem II. The 1950–51 season was Dillen's breakthrough, scoring 21 times and earning the nickname "The Canon". Besides Dillen and Fransen, a memorable player of the early 1950s success was goalkeeper Lieuwe Steiger, who ended up playing 383 matches for PSV.

In 1955, PSV became the first Dutch club to enter the European Champion Clubs' Cup. The two matches against Rapid Wien ended in 1–6 and 1–0. Other success in the 1950s remained absent but in the 1956–57 season, Dillen scored 43 times, a Dutch record that still stands today. The approaching 1960s marked a shift in player's heritage: the team went from mostly Brabantian men to players nationwide. Representative for this policy were defender Roel Wiersma, who arrived in 1954 and captained the team for a decade, and Piet van der Kuil, who came from Ajax for the equivalent of €59,000 (PSV's then-highest transfer fee). Dillen left the club in 1961 after being club top scorer every year from 1953 to 1961. In 1962, Otten also decided to quit as chairman of the sports union. By then, board member Ben van Gelder had gradually started to mold the club in his way. Throughout the next two decades, he became responsible for turning PSV into a full-fledged professional organization.

=== Van der Kuijlen era and UEFA Cup victory (1963–1978) ===
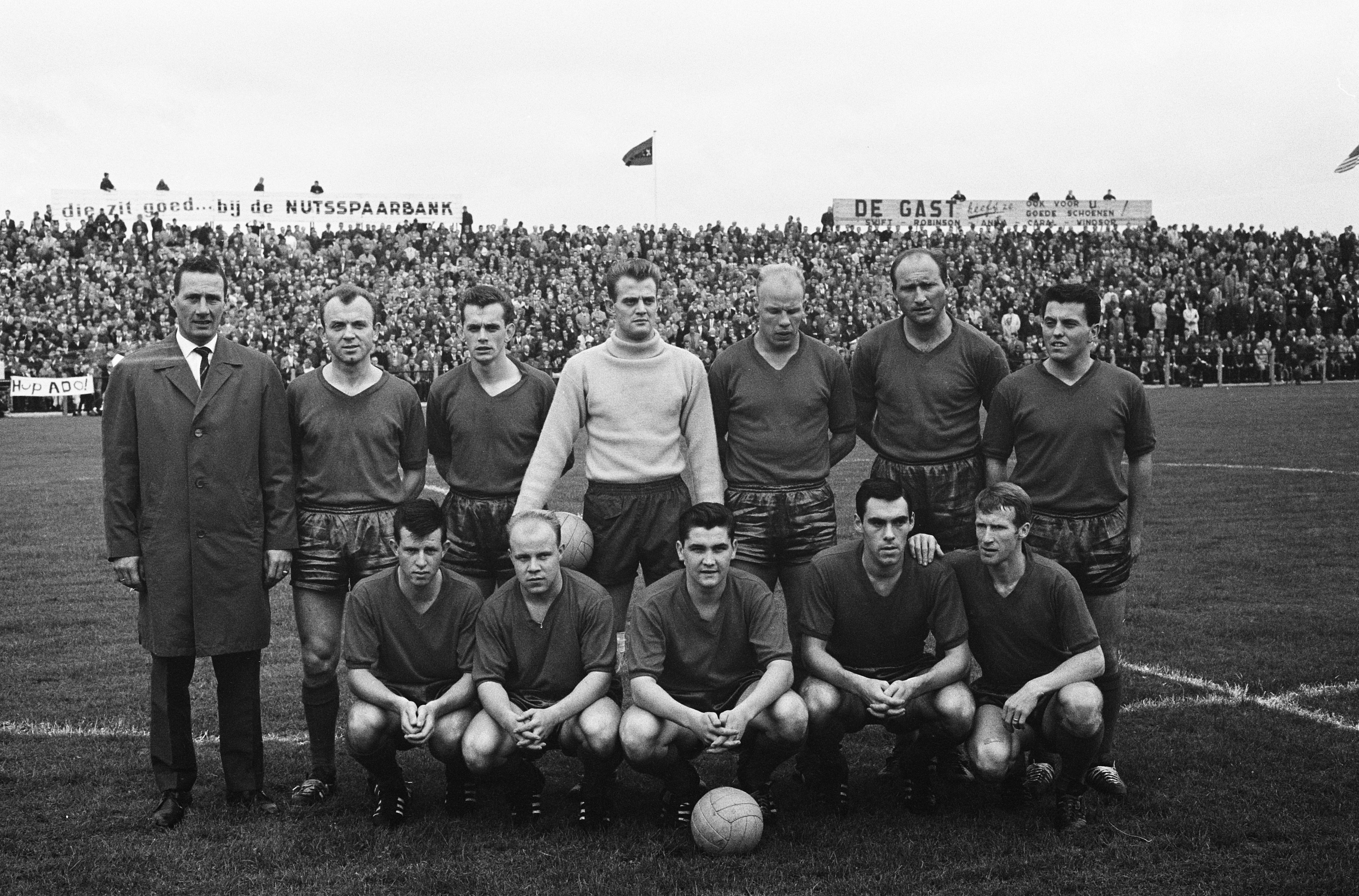
The PSV squad (1963)

In the 1962–63 season, marking PSV's 50-year anniversary, the club appointed Bram Appel as the new coach. The first results were disastrous, however, with a mere six points earned from the first six fixtures. A sudden revival led to a first place at the winter break and a 5–2 victory over Ajax in June meant that PSV could celebrate its fourth league title, with Pierre Kerkhofs leading the goal scorer charts with 22 goals. The following year, PSV ended second in the league but more significantly, reached the Europa Cup I quarter-finals for the first time, where it was eliminated by FC Zürich. Appel remained coach for five years; the position was later on followed up with short stints by Milan Nikolić and Wim Blokland. Willy van der Kuijlen was signed in 1964, who produced 23 league goals in 1966 and became the league's top scorer at age 20.

Between 1968 and 1972, Kurt Linder coached PSV. His team reached two Dutch cup finals and the semi-finals of the European Cup Winners' Cup. Van der Kuijlen had trouble fulfilling his promise after an encouraging career start in the 1960s, however, partly because of a lack of chemistry between him and Linder's harsh coaching style. The early 1970s in football were dominated by Ajax and Feyenoord and it was not until the appointment of Kees Rijvers as coach in 1972 that would mark the start of increasing success for PSV. With Van der Kuijlen and goalkeeper Jan van Beveren as the stars of the team, Rijvers created a new squad by signing Ralf Edström, Gerrie Deijkers and the twins Willy and René van de Kerkhof. Things improved for Van der Kuijlen when Rijvers built the team around him, giving him a free role in the process. Van der Kuijlen, a technical player, formed a successful striker partnership with Edström, who was famed for his heading ability. It led to a Dutch cup victory in 1974, and after a blistering season start (no defeats in the first season half) and 28 goals by Van der Kuijlen. PSV also won the league for the fifth time in 1975.

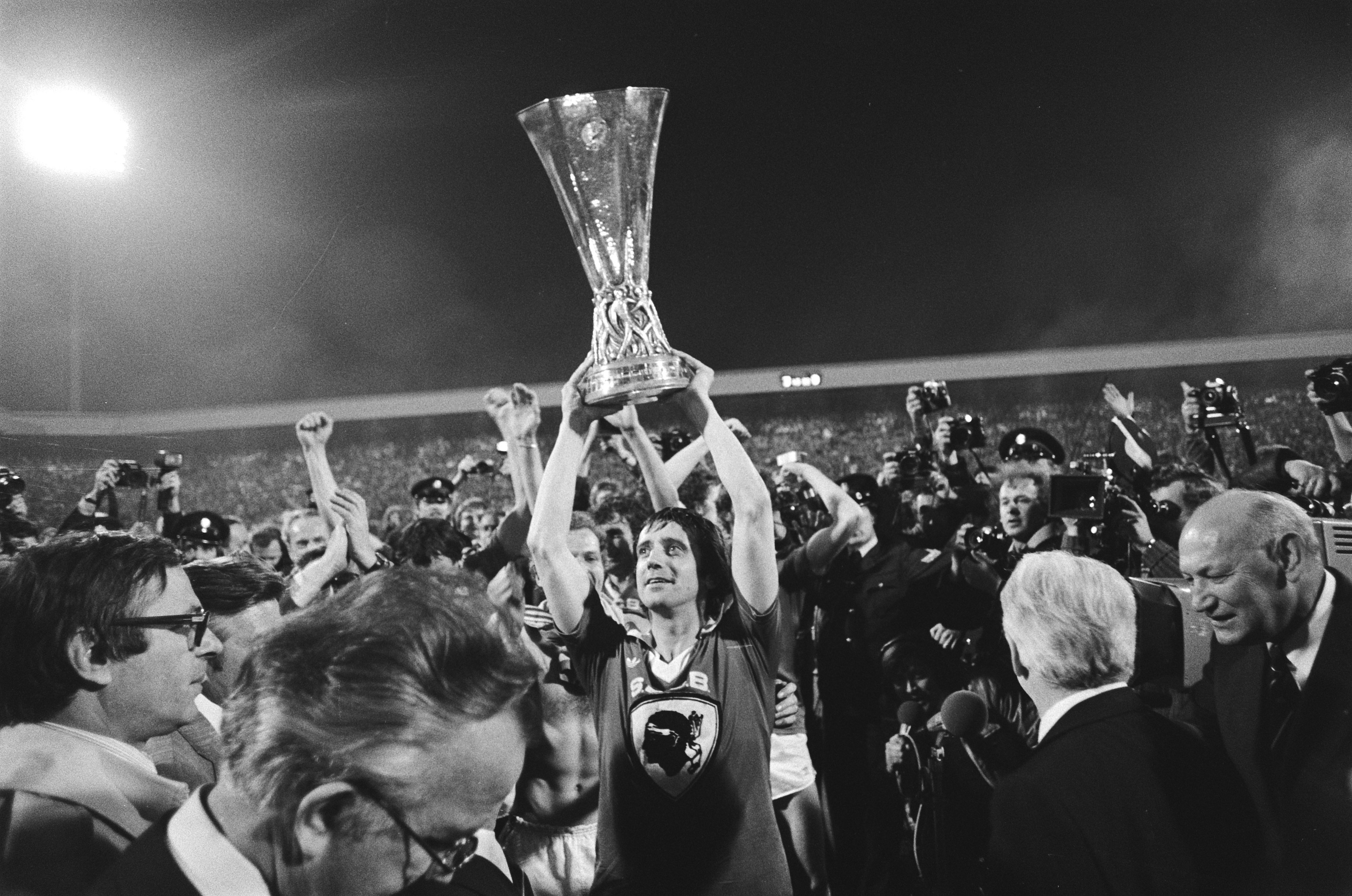
Willy van der Kuijlen celebrating with the UEFA Cup after the final victory in Eindhoven

A year later, PSV managed to win its first double. With defender Huub Stevens joining the team, the league title was secured after a 4–1 result against Feyenoord. Earlier, a 1–0 victory over Roda JC meant that PSV won the national cup as well. In the European Cup, the final was only narrowly missed after a 1–0 aggregate loss against Saint-Étienne in the semi-finals. After the two consecutive titles, PSV ended second in 1977. The following year, Edström left the squad but PSV nonetheless enjoyed a strong league campaign. In April 1978, the team secured the title without a single loss. The domestic cup ended early after a shocking 1–6 first round loss against FC Wageningen (PSV's biggest home loss ever to date). The UEFA Cup campaign proved to be more successful; after wins against Glenavon, Widzew Łódź, Eintracht Braunschweig and 1. FC Magdeburg, the team faced Barcelona. A 3–0 win in the first leg was nullified by the Spaniards in the return leg, but a single goal by Nick Deacy at Camp Nou meant that PSV could progress with a 4–3 aggregate win. The two-legged final against Bastia first produced a goalless draw in the first match. The return leg in Eindhoven ended in a 3–0 win, with goals by Willy van de Kerkhof, Deijkers and Van der Kuijlen providing PSV its first European trophy.

=== Hiddink and the European Cup victory (1979–1989) ===
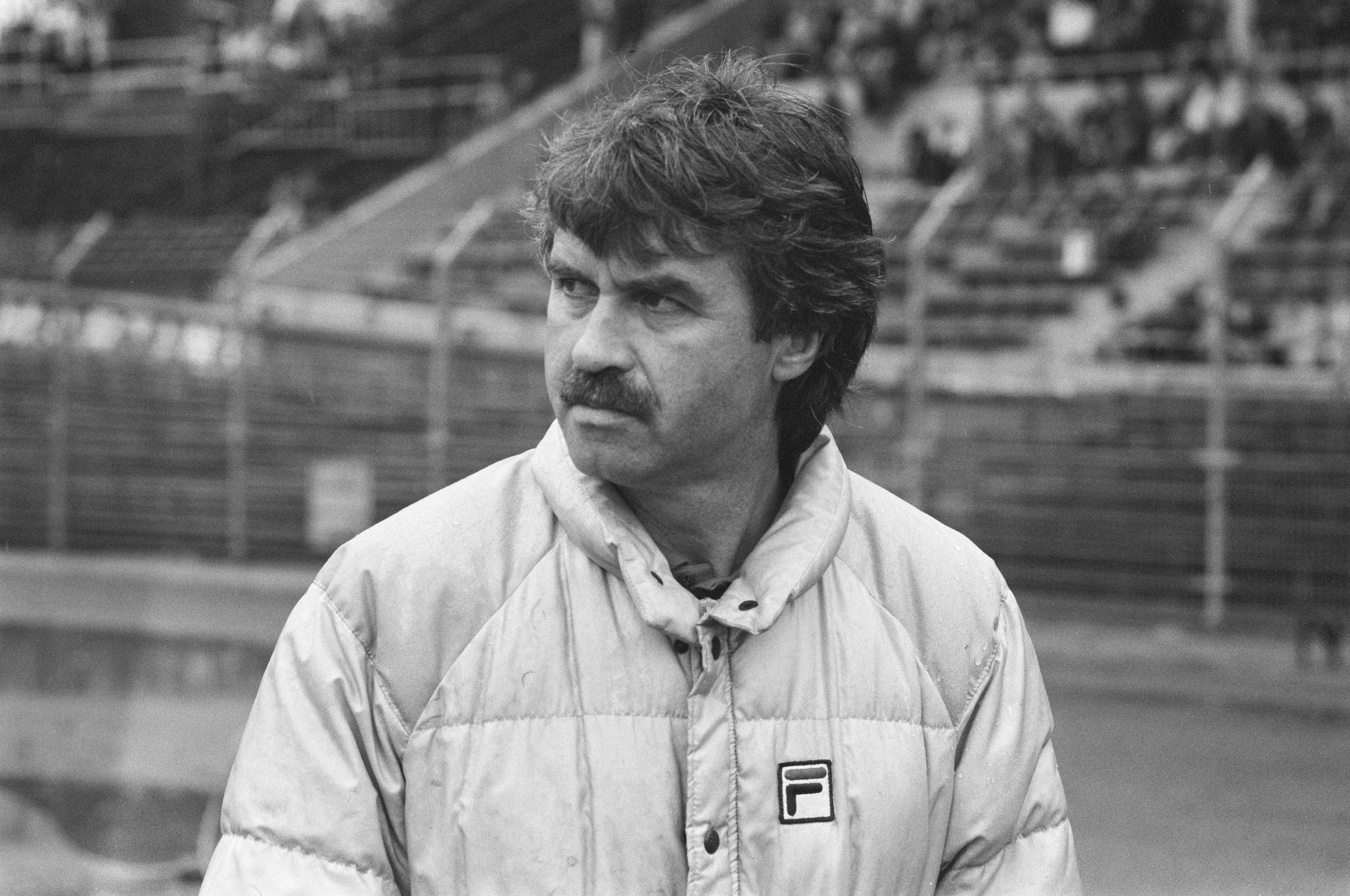
Guus Hiddink as coach of PSV in 1988

After the UEFA Cup victory, the team chemistry started to suffer, which was reflected in the results. Not long after a 6–0 UEFA Cup loss against Saint-Étienne, Rijvers was sacked and the squad disintegrated. Van Beveren, unhappy with the declining success and Rijvers' departure, left for the United States after 291 league games and years of captaincy. Van Gelder also quit in 1980 and was replaced by Kees Ploegsma. Even though PSV invested in players like Hallvar Thoresen and Jurrie Koolhof, success remained absent. Thijs Libregts' (coach from 1980 until 1983) highest league position was the second place in the 1981–82 season, and in 1983, Jan Reker took over. A clash between Van der Kuijlen and Libregts led to the former's departure in 1982 after nearly 18 seasons at the club.

In 1985, chairman Jacques Ruts and Ploegsma decided on a change of direction: Hans Kraay became the new director of football (supervising Reker in 1985–86, and taking over altogether in 1986–87) and PSV started to sign players with flair, like Ruud Gullit, Søren Lerby, Gerald Vanenburg and Eric Gerets. Gullit, who quickly was appointed as captain, contributed to the team that headed the league table for the majority of the 1985–86 Eredivisie and claimed the title after an 8–2 win against Go Ahead Eagles. Being unhappy with his personal development, Gullit heavily criticized PSV and Kraay in a March 1987 interview. The management's subsequent warning was deemed too lenient by Kraay, who resigned. Gullit's strained relationship with the club meant that he left for Milan in the summer for a world record fee of €7.7 million. Earlier that year, Guus Hiddink replaced Kraay and Ronald Koeman joined PSV. That season, the squad suffered early eliminations from the Dutch cup and European Cup, but secured the title in the penultimate match.

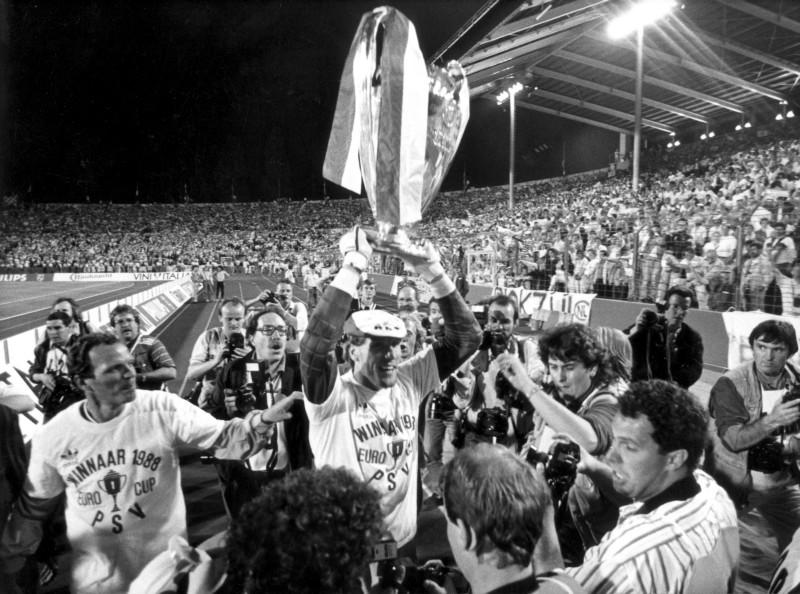
Hans van Breukelen celebrating with the European Cup after the match in Stuttgart

The 1987–88 season turned out to be PSV's best year in history. The Eredivisie was won four matches before the end after many high scoring matches, leading up to 117 goals. The cup was also won after beating Roda JC 3–2 after extra time. The European Cup campaign started with wins against Galatasaray and Rapid Wien. Subsequently, PSV managed to reach the final with only draws. The quarter finals against Bordeaux were decided by Wim Kieft’s away goal. A vicious foul by Hans Gillhaus on Jean Tigana was praised by Koeman, which prompted UEFA to suspend him for the semi-final return leg against Real Madrid. Again, an away goal in the first leg (a notoriously lethargic shot by Edward Linskens at the Santiago Bernabéu Stadium) meant that the second leg's 0–0 was enough to proceed. The final against Benfica, held in Stuttgart, remained goalless. In the penalty shoot-out, Van Breukelen saved Benfica's sixth penalty by António Veloso, which meant that PSV had won the European Cup and completed the treble.

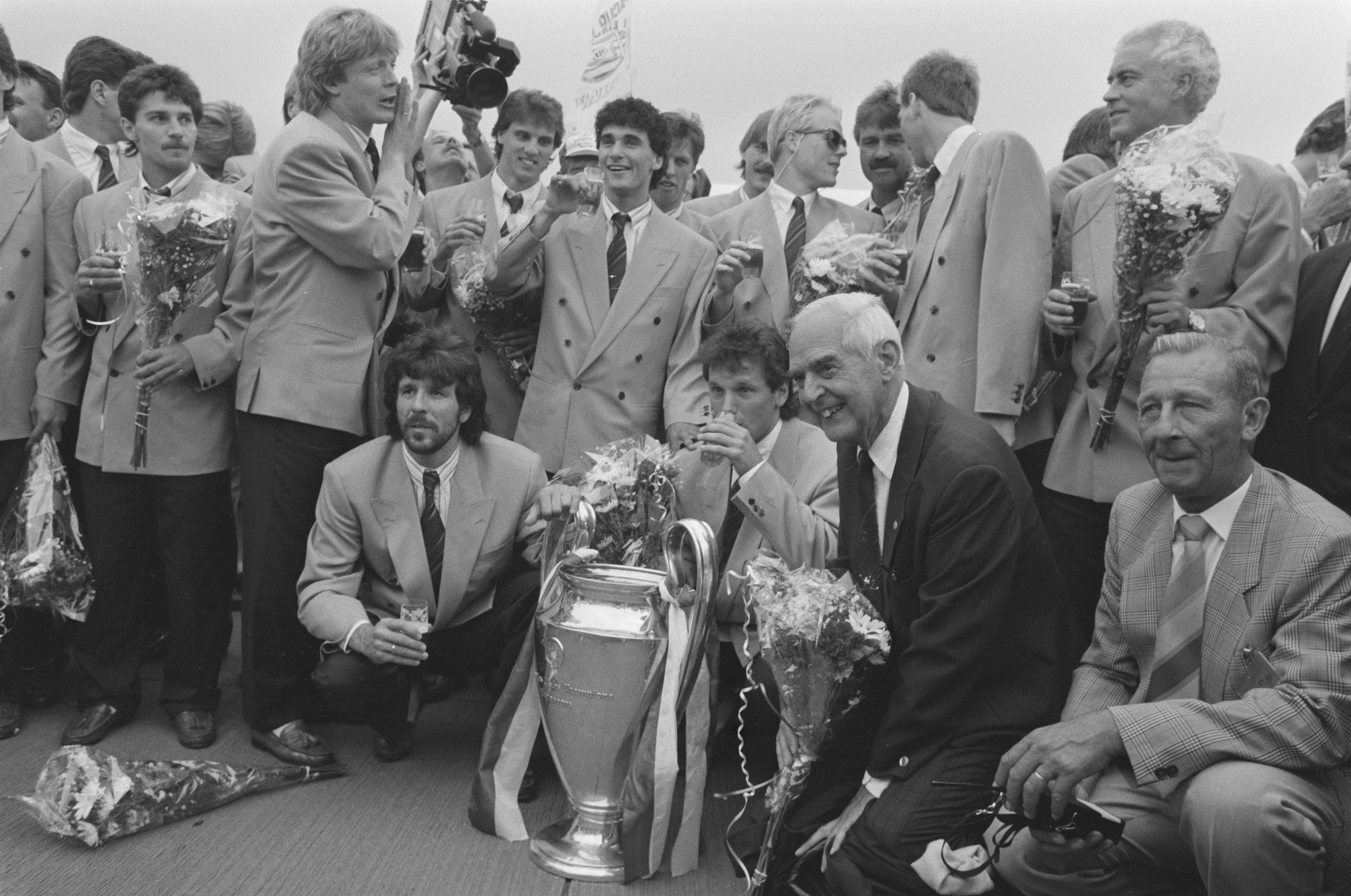
Eric Gerets (left) posing with the European Cup, together with Frits Philips (right)

After the summer break, Willy van de Kerkhof, present at both the 1978 and 1988 triumphs, was honored with a farewell match. The 1988–89 season again resulted in the double: Hiddink's squad won the title (albeit with less dominance than the year before) and PSV beat Groningen in the cup final. In comparison, the international competitions were disappointing. The Intercontinental Cup against Nacional ended in a 2–2 draw, but PSV lost the penalty shoot-out with 7–6. The team was also beaten in the UEFA Super Cup by KV Mechelen (3–1 on aggregate). In the European Cup, Real Madrid got its revenge by eliminating PSV in the quarter-finals.

=== Developing talent (1989–1999) ===
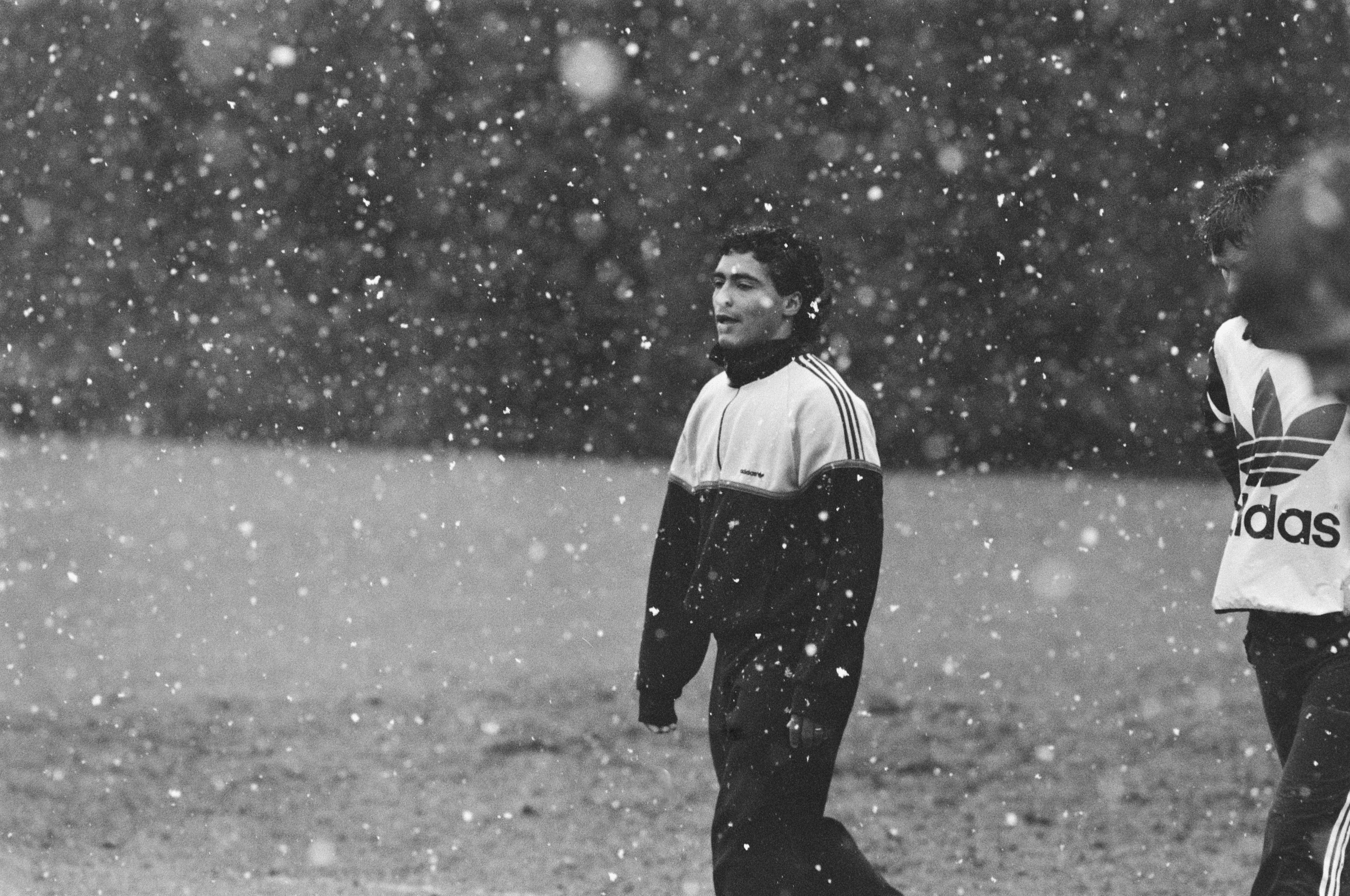
Romário during a PSV training session in 1989

After the European Cup win, PSV outsmarted many clubs by signing Romário. After a first season with 19 league goals, his hat-trick in the November 1989 match against Steaua București (5–1) – including a memorable solo effort – was his big breakthrough. In 1989, after Koeman left, PSV ended second in the league, but won the KNVB Cup after defeating Vitesse (1–0). Hiddink left the team in 1990, to be replaced by Bobby Robson. In his two seasons at the club, PSV won two league titles; the first one on goal difference (with Ajax) and the second one in the penultimate match against Groningen. Meanwhile, Romário – league top scorer in 1989, 1990 and 1991 – was admired by fans, but sometimes also renounced by the squad for being unprofessional and selfish. Robson had frequent clashes with Romário, but the striker never changed his ways. These events, in addition to the lack of European success, meant that Robson was let go in 1992. While Gerets retired, Hans Westerhof took over as coach, but only won the Super Cup in his single season at the helm. In 1993, Romário was transferred to Barcelona. Westerhof was replaced by Aad de Mos, who led the team to the third place.

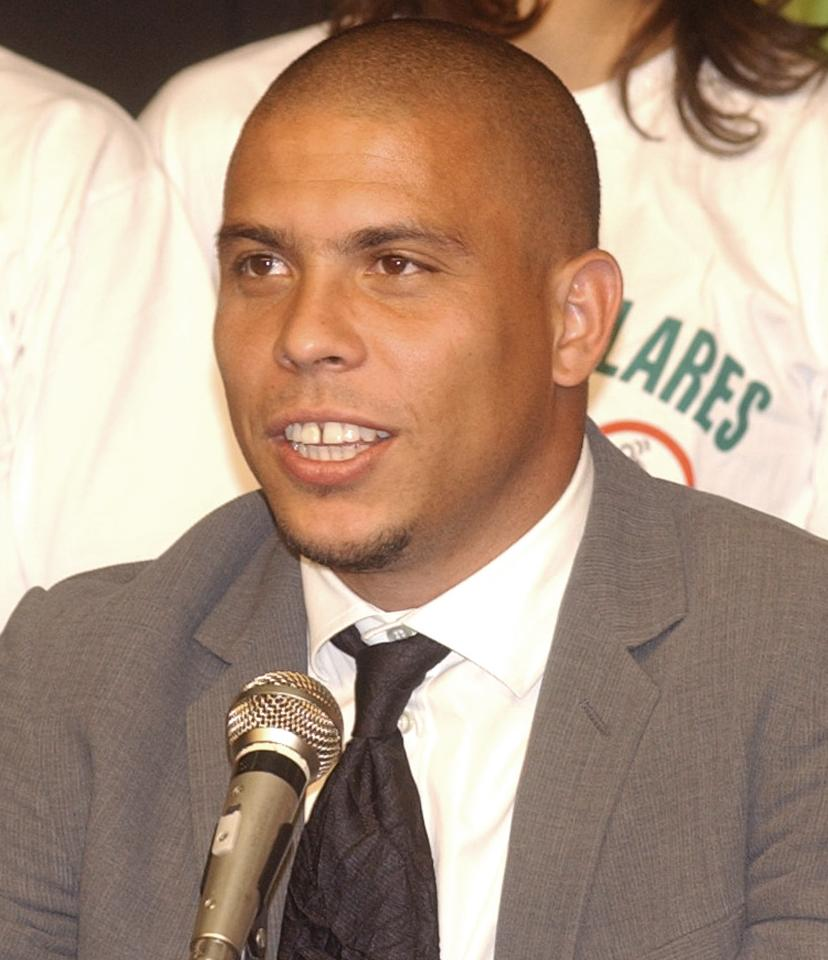
PSV was the first European club to sign Ronaldo

Early in the 1994–95 season, De Mos was fired and replaced by Dick Advocaat (after Kees Rijvers temporarily took over). PSV saw Van Breukelen retiring and signed Luc Nilis in 1994, who formed a powerful duo with another signing, the 17-year-old Ronaldo. The Brazilian striker scored 30 goals in his debut season, while Nilis was named Dutch Footballer of the Year in an otherwise trophy-less year. After an injury-filled 1995–96 season where he still managed 12 goals, Ronaldo left for Barcelona. That season, PSV won the cup after a 5–2 win against Sparta Rotterdam. In the 1996–97 season, when Harry van Raaij became chairman, Advocaat had created a team with players like Phillip Cocu, Jaap Stam, Boudewijn Zenden and Wim Jonk. It led to the Eredivisie title, with Nilis becoming league top goalscorer (21 goals). In the 1997–98 season, the team came in second behind Ajax in both league and cup. It resulted in Cocu, Stam, Zenden, Jonk and Advocaat leaving PSV, forcing the club to build a new squad. Robson temporarily returned in 1998 for one year so that desired coach Eric Gerets could get his coaching badges. Again, Nilis showed to be highly compatible with a poacher-type striker; new signing Ruud van Nistelrooy scored 31 times in his first season. In the season's last round, PSV beat Utrecht 3–2 with a last-minute goal by Arnold Bruggink – just enough for Champions League qualification.

=== Dutch hegemony (2000–2008) ===
In the 1999–2000 season, Van Nistelrooy had scored 29 goals after just 23 matches, but after two serious injuries, an imminent transfer to Manchester United was forced to be postponed for a year. PSV were comfortably crowned league champions in Gerets' debut year, creating a 16-point gap with runner-up Heerenveen. The 2000–01 Eredivisie was also won with new striker Mateja Kežman, who replaced Van Nistelrooy and the departed Nilis. The cup final was lost to Twente after penalties. In the UEFA Cup, PSV faced 1. FC Kaiserslautern at home; fans threatening to storm the field during the match prompted Gerets and some players to personally intervene. PSV was fined by UEFA and forced to play a European match on neutral ground. After Van Nistelrooy left, PSV ended second in the 2001–02 season and were eliminated in the UEFA Cup quarter-finals by Feyenoord.

Gerets was released and Guus Hiddink returned to the club as coach and director of football, with Arjen Robben, Park Ji-sung, Lee Young-pyo joining PSV. Their first season immediately brought a league title, secured in the last match against Groningen. But in the 2003–04 season, PSV failed to reclaim the championship. In 2004, the PSV board clashed with Hiddink and Van Raaij concerning the expenditures. Van Raaij left in September and Hiddink never got along with his successor Rob Westerhof, who sided with the board. Even though Kežman and Robben left in 2004, Hiddink had gradually built a powerful squad, with Heurelho Gomes, Alex, Park, Lee, Mark van Bommel and the returning Phillip Cocu. The Eredivisie was won five matches before the end, and Willem II was beaten in the cup final. After eight consecutive Champions League group stage eliminations, PSV reached the knockout stage. There, they beat Monaco 3–0 on aggregate and Lyon after penalties. The first semi-final against Milan was lost 2–0. In the return, PSV took a 2–0 lead but a late goal by Massimo Ambrosini ended the hope to reach the final, despite an injury-time third goal by Cocu.

After the 2004–05 season, Van Bommel, Vogel, Park and Lee left. With new signing Timmy Simons and youth prospect Ibrahim Afellay, PSV reached the Champions League knockout stage again. In that round, Lyon revenged PSV by winning 5–0 on aggregate. The team did win the league, but lost the cup final to Ajax. Afterwards, Hiddink left and Ronald Koeman replaced him. Westerhof, who lost support from the board, resigned soon after Hiddink's departure. Jan Reker became general manager. During the 2006–07 season, league leaders PSV squandered a 12-point lead, enabling AZ and Ajax to equal their 72 points before the last round. A surprise AZ defeat in the last fixture meant that PSV's 5–1 victory against Vitesse was enough to edge the title win; PSV had a single goal difference with Ajax. Koeman was criticised by the board after losing a big lead, but was eventually allowed to remain as coach. In the 2007–08 season, after Cocu and Alex left, the team was disqualified from the KNVB Cup after fielding a suspended Manuel da Costa. In October, Koeman took up the coaching job at Valencia, prompting PSV to first appoint Jan Wouters and then Sef Vergoossen as caretakers. The fourth title in a row was won in the last match, again against Vitesse. After the title, Heurelho Gomes and director of football Stan Valckx voiced criticism towards Reker, forcing the club to choose between Reker and Gomes. Subsequently, Reker sacked Valckx and sold Gomes to Tottenham Hotspur.

=== Recent years (2008–present) ===
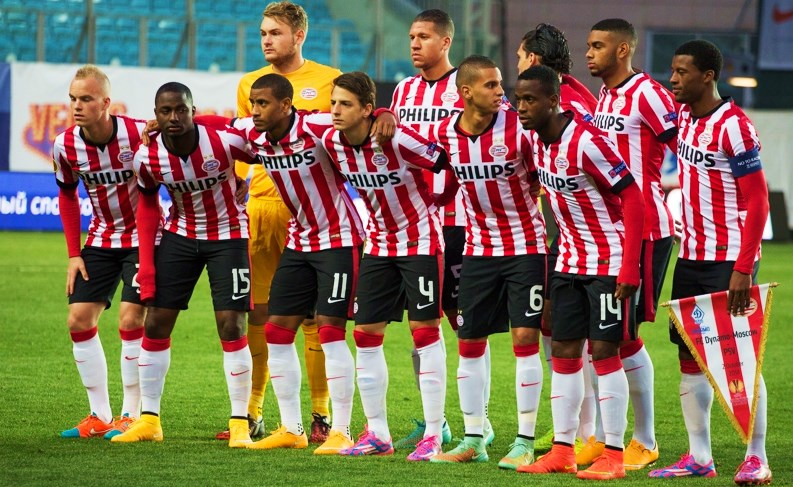
PSV in 2014

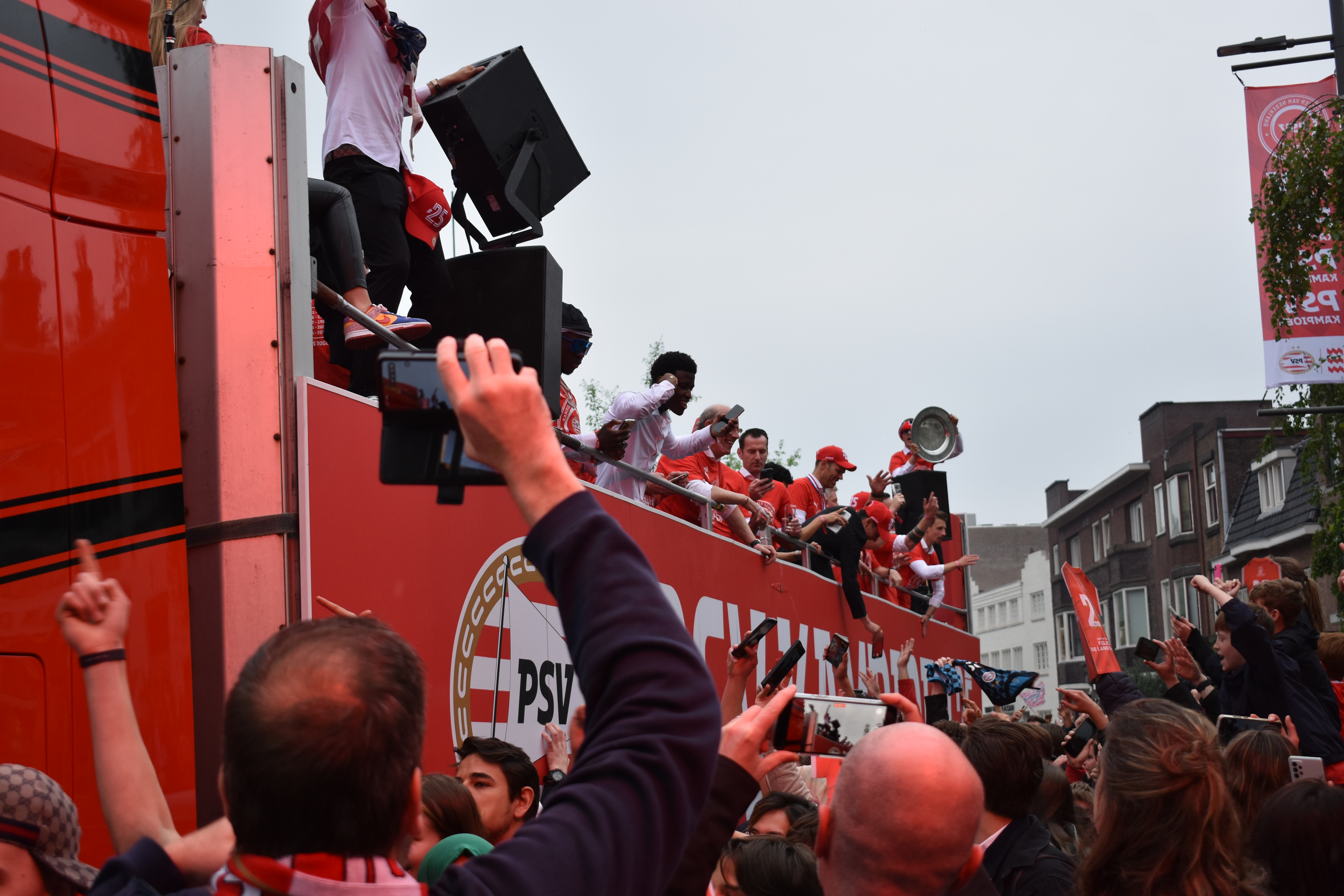
The PSV selection drives through Eindhoven on the bus after the club won the national title for the 25th time (2024)

Huub Stevens returned as coach in 2008, but disappointing performances and clashes between Stevens and the squad resulted in his resignation six months later. Caretaker Dwight Lodeweges wrapped up the season with a fourth place. The following year, Fred Rutten was appointed as coach. In his first two seasons, PSV reached the third place twice. With Rutten as coach, PSV beat Feyenoord 10–0 in a home game on 24 October 2010, a historical win and Feyenoord's heaviest defeat in their club history. Meanwhile, the club experienced liquidity problems, but secured its future through loans and property sales. Key players Ibrahim Afellay and Balázs Dzsudzsák were sold and as a consequence, director of football Marcel Brands spent €25 million to improve the squad. But in the 2011–12 season, the team dropped out of the title race early again, which led to Rutten's dismissal. Phillip Cocu finished the season as caretaker, leading the team to a third place and a KNVB Cup after beating Heracles Almelo. For the 2012–13 season, Dick Advocaat returned as head coach, while Mark van Bommel returned from Milan. Despite 103 league goals, the team ended as runner-up in both Eredivisie and KNVB Cup. Advocaat, who struggled with the job's intensity, left after one season. In 2013, Cocu was appointed as head coach. On 18 April 2015, PSV won the Eredivisie after a 4–1 win over Heerenveen. This was their first league title since 2008, and it ended a four-year domination of the league by Ajax. On 8 December 2015, PSV reached the knock-out stages of the Champions League, becoming the first Dutch club to do so since the 2006–07 Champions League season. PSV defended their league title in 2016 owing to a 1–1 draw between Ajax (who led the table prior to this day on goal difference) and 17th-placed De Graafschap in the last game of the season. After finishing third in the 2016–17 season, PSV once again claimed the Eredivisie title in 2018 with a 3–0 win against Ajax, who were in second place.

On 30 March 2022, the team announced that Ruud van Nistelrooy, who played with the team from 1998 to 2001 would take over as manager starting from the 2022–2023 season. He won the Johan Cruyff Shield and the KNVB Cup in his first season. On 13 January 2024, the club repeated the feat of a perfect win record in the first half of Eredivisie fixtures (17–0–0).

== Crest and colours ==
PSV's first crest consisted of a light bulb and the words "Philips Sport" in a circular shape. Its next incarnation was a shield-shaped logo with red-and-white vertical lines, topped off with the letters "PSV". The third design of the crest proved to be a durable one; its oval shape, red-and-white horizontal lines and a flag with the PSV letters incorporated remains used until today. Only minor changes have occurred: the border color and addition of horseshoe-shaped figures, a circle around the three letters and the addition of two stars to commemorate winning twenty league titles. Early incarnations of the oval version also included dots for the abbreviation "P.S.V.". For the centennial celebrations in 2013, a laurel wreath and the number "100" in gold were temporarily added to the crest.

The colours red and white were chosen at the founding meeting in 1913 by Jan Willem Hofkes, the first chairman of the club. He apparently appreciated the contrast between his red raspberry drink and his white notepad. Inspired by the club colours, the first kit consisted of a red-and-white vertically striped shirt, black shorts and red-and-white horizontally striped socks. This combination was worn until the 1970s, when the club switched to a completely red shirt, which was worn with either white or black shorts. The red kit was changed back to a striped version in 1989. The red-and-white stripes have remained ever since, albeit in very varied adaptations. The shorts would also often change between black and white. During Ruud Gullit's tenure at PSV, he personally changed the shorts from black to white, in an attempt to improve the stature of the kit. For the centennial celebrations in 2013, PSV have temporarily switched to an all-red jersey with white shorts and socks. Its design choices were meant to reminisce the kits worn during the 1987–88 season.

Because of the close ties with Philips, PSV had the same jersey sponsor without exception from 1982, the year jersey sponsorships were introduced in the Eredivisie, until 2016. This is a record in Dutch football. Starting in the 2016–17 season, however, Philips was no longer the main shirt sponsor. PSV's first clothing sponsor was Le Coq Sportif, from 1970 to 1974, when it switched to Adidas. They remained the sponsor until 1995, when they were replaced by Nike, until Umbro became the shirt sponsor in 2015, ending a 20-year relationship between PSV and Nike.

== Stadium and training facilities ==
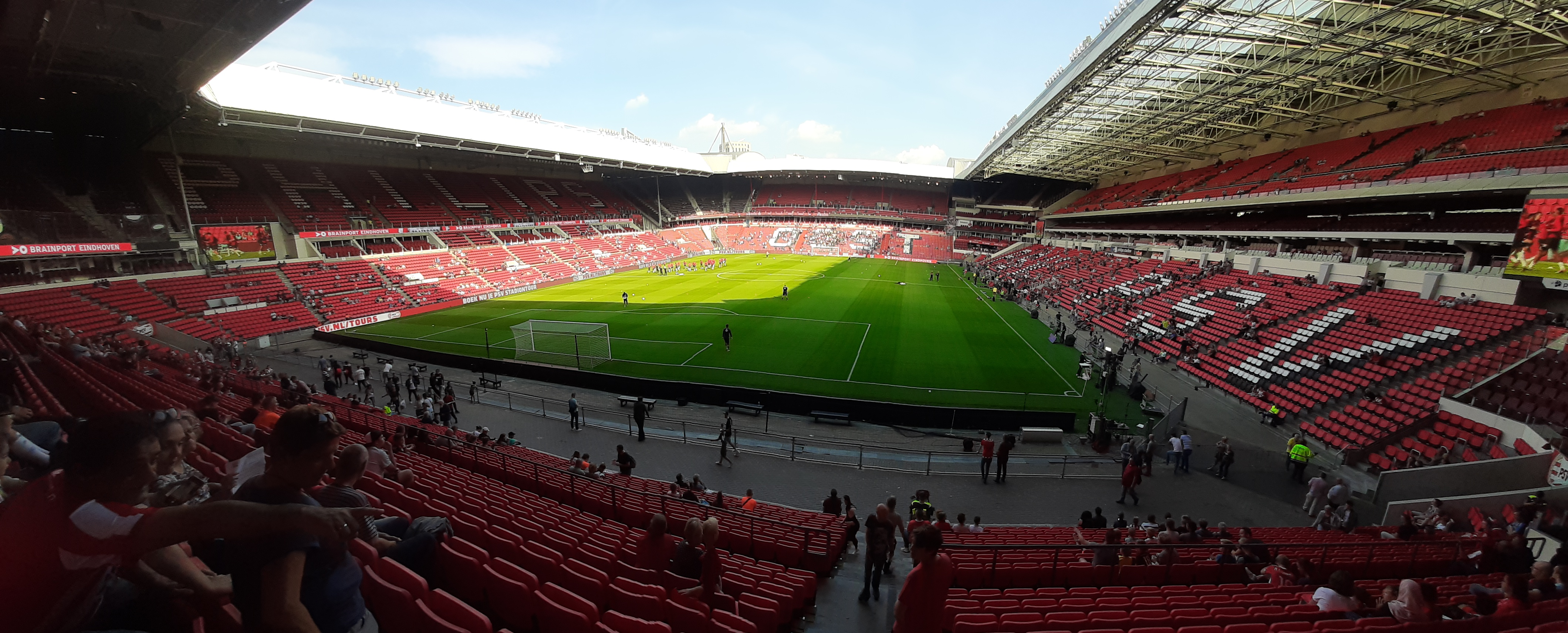
The Philips Stadion

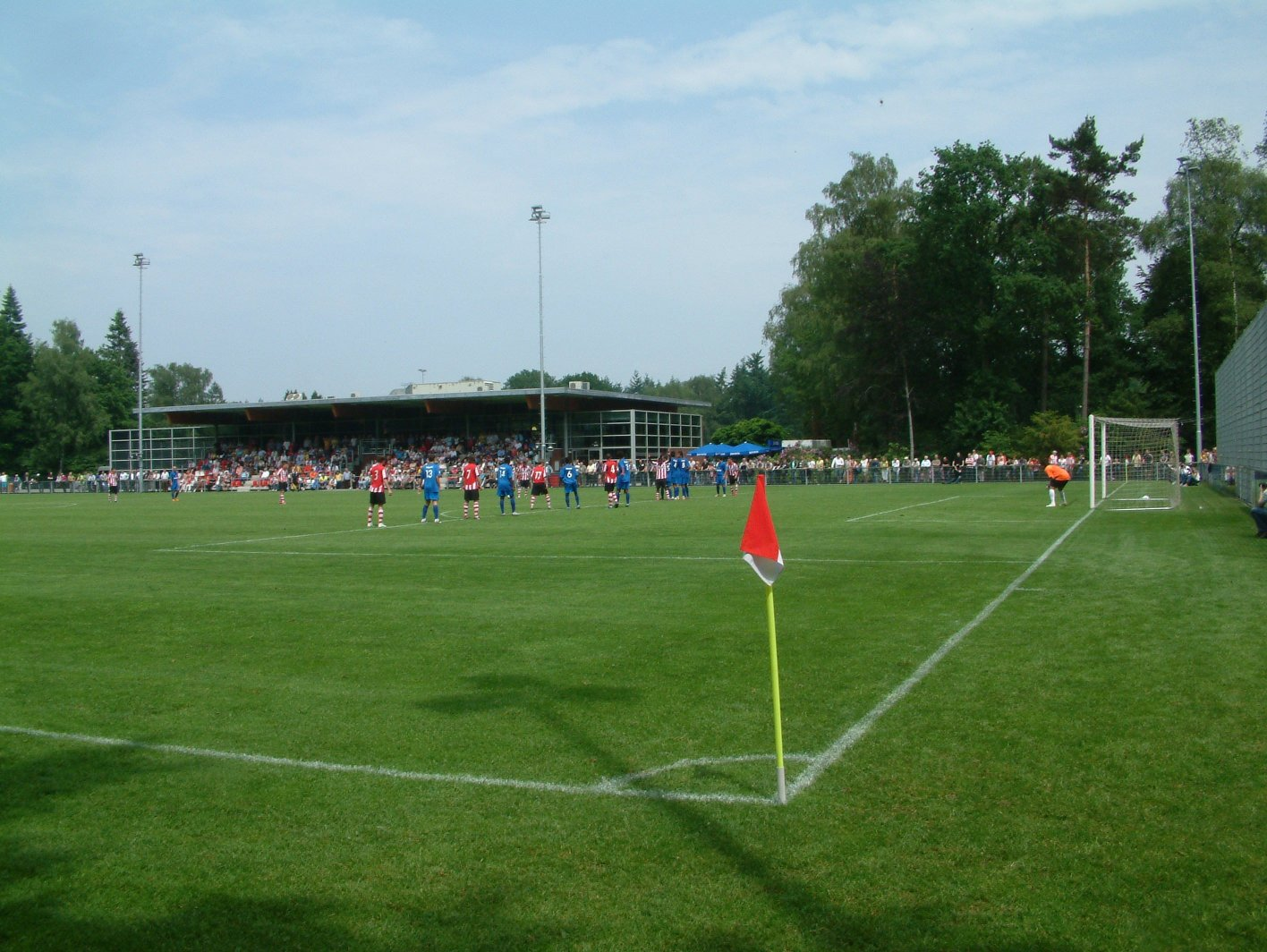
PSV Under-19 plays a match on De Herdgang's main field.

PSV have played at the Philips Stadion since its foundation in 1913, when it was still named Philips Sportpark. The venue was built in the Strijp borough, and more specifically in the Philipsdorp area – a neighborhood set up in 1910 by Anton Philips to provide accommodation to employees. A football field was simultaneously laid out where PSV's predecessor, the Philips Elftal, played its first match on 15 January 1911 against Hollandia from Woensel. In 1916, the first wooden stand was built, providing seating space for 550 viewers. Another stand with 900 seats was built in the 1930s. In 1941, a running track was added, but it was removed 17 years later. During World War II, the stadium was damaged by the war; the reparations took place after the liberation of South Netherlands in 1944.

Four 40-meter high floodlights were installed in the stadium in 1958, making evening matches possible. The lights were inaugurated with an exhibition match against Anderlecht. In 1977, the main stand was completely rebuilt, but an alkali–silica reaction ten years later caused the concrete to crack. Chairman Jacques Ruts, who was previously introduced to the skybox in the United States, considered a new stand to be an opportunity to attract more sponsors. The new main stand – two tiers, with skyboxes in the middle – was introduced in a friendly match against Milan in 1988. In the nineties, the other three stands are also elevated. The last major renovation was the closing of the four open corners of the stadium. Along with creating more seats, the new corners had window blind-type constructions, which allowed air to flow through to let the grass breathe. The completion was celebrated in October 2002, with the capacity increased to 35,000. In the summer of 2005, the club removed the tall fences around the pitch, replacing them with lower railings keeping the spectators off the grass. Unauthorized persons who invade the pitch will receive a €15,000 penalty and a ten-year-ban from visiting the ground.

The Philips Stadion has been awarded four out of five stars by the UEFA Stadium Rankings. The ground hold several designated areas. The lower terraces on the East stand are considered the most popular location for most fans, but there are also separate areas for youngsters up to 16 years old, for the disabled and for away fans in the north-west upper corner. A stand named the "Family Corner" specifically serves children up to 12 and their parents. For business representatives, the stadium has business rooms and suites, totaling 1186 seats. Besides football-related activities, the stadium holds merchandising stores, offices and three restaurants, including the Michelin-star assigned Avant-Garde. For the centennial celebrations, a PSV Museum was revealed in the stadium. Training sessions by PSV are conducted on De Herdgang, located in the outskirts of Eindhoven. With ten fields and fitness facilities, it also accommodates all PSV youth and amateur teams. Its last major renovation occurred in 2019.

Early 2024, PSV announced that the company "Hypercube" was assigned to investigate the possibilities for a larger stadium. Just over 1,5 years later PSV signed a declaration of intent with the city counsel of Eindhoven in which was stated the stadium would be expended by at least 10.000 seats, the scheduled build would start after the 2026-2027 season and that both parties will work extensively together in the project. PSV presented the first official plans to her supporters at March 19th, 2026. These included architectural drawings, expected costs (350-400 million euros) and that the current stadium will be expended, which was to the delight of the supporters meaning the club will stay at the iconic ground. The last step, which is still to be taken, is approval of the city counsel, after which PSV can start the expansion. The following decision will be taken on the 15th of December 2026, after which building is expected to start directly after PSV's last home match against NEC on 16th of May, 2027. The project is expected to be finished latest 2030 with an total amount of seats of 55.000, a new third ring and a new, modernized appearance in- and outside of the stadium.

== Support and rivalries ==
PSV have attracted around 33,000 people to Eredivisie matches on average in the last years. The record attendance stands at 35,200, achieved in a match against Feyenoord at 17 November 2002. The club always reserves tickets for away fans and individual ticket purchases; the maximum number of season ticket holders therefore is 29,200. All season tickets were sold out in 2007 and 2008. More recently in 2013, PSV sold 28,000 season tickets. Research showed that over 25,000 season ticket holders hail from North Brabant, with other significant groups coming from Limburg, Gelderland, South Holland, North Holland and Belgium.

PSV currently has two independent fan bodies. The Supportersvereniging PSV was founded in 1920 and currently consists of 14,000 members. They own a fan base within the Philips Stadion. The second one, PSV Fans United, serve a more specific purpose: to improve the atmosphere in the stadium. Besides the fan unions, there are several sets of fans who work together on tifo choreography, like Lighttown Madness among others. The PSV Junior Club was founded by PSV in 1998 for children up to 12 years. Later it was renamed Phoxy Club after Phoxy, PSV's mascot. Currently, more than 20,000 children are members. Every year, the Phoxy Club Day is organized, offering activities for members who are joined by the first team squad. During pre-season, PSV also holds an Open Day for people of all ages; the event gives the opportunity for sponsors and new player signings to be presented. The official club anthem was composed by Kees van der Weijden and Jo Vermeulen. It was introduced in 1950 and is currently sung at every home match at 19 minutes and 13 seconds into the game – the time mirroring the club's foundation year.

PSV's main rivalry is with Ajax, with both teams regularly competing for the league title in the last forty years. The PSV fans, whose club has reserved the kit number "12" for them, refer to themselves as boeren (peasants/farmers); the word can be heard chanted through the home ground after every PSV goal. Its reference designates taking pride in their Brabantian heritage, as opposed to the metropolitan Amsterdam area. The Brabantian identity also plays a fundamental role in the club's culture with the Flag of North Brabant being incorporated in shirt design and being displayed in and around the stadium. PSV used to have an ongoing rivalry with FC Eindhoven, which originated in the 1910s. FC Eindhoven, being the older team, manifested itself as the "people's club", whereas PSV was only open to Philips employees. In the 1940s and 1950s, PSV and FC Eindhoven were both competing for the league title, which increased the feud and divided the City of Light in "red-white striped" and "blue-white striped". Fixtures between the two sides were named the Lichtstadderby ("City of Light Derby"). After FC Eindhoven's decline in the 1970s, the rivalry disappeared. Nowadays, relations between the two sets of supporters are generally friendly; during the annual pre-season derby supporters even sit in the same end without any major incidents. Although a friendly rivalry still exists, it is mostly felt on the FC Eindhoven side. However, it is not uncommon for people in Eindhoven to go to FC Eindhoven on Fridays (the usual matchday in the Eerste Divisie) and to go to PSV on a Saturday or Sunday. In recent times, FC Eindhoven was PSV's feeder club on several occasions and the clubs share a women's team and youth setup.

== Organization and finances ==
PSV was an association (vereniging) until 1999, when it became a public limited company with shareholders (naamloze vennootschap). It meant that the club installed a board of directors, who are not involved in most of the decision-making processes. Instead, they serve as an advising and supervising entity. All shares but one are owned by a foundation, the Foundation PSV Football. The remaining share is owned by the Eindhoven Football Club PSV, another separate entity. The general manager holds responsibility for all activities regarding the club, and is supported by a manager operations and a treasurer. PSV also appoints a director of football, who manages football-related processes such as transfers (in conjunction with the technical staff), to control the long-term planning.

PSV was founded by Philips and in the first decades, the club was only open to employees. The club did sign players from elsewhere, however; one of the perks of playing for PSV was that players who were offered a football contract were always offered a Philips job as well. Philips has been kit sponsor since 1982 and the PSV home ground has included the Philips name since its foundation. The company was paying €7.5 million per year for the sponsoring when they ended their kit sponsorship role in 2016. Frits Philips, chairman of the company between 1961 and 1971, became an icon for PSV during his lifetime. At five years of age, he conducted the ceremonial kick-off at the first Philips Elftal match in 1911. Frits Philips would become intertwined with PSV and Eindhoven; his 100th birthday was widely celebrated in the city. Frits Philips had his own spot in the stands until his death and would sometimes provide pep talks to the squad during half-time. PSV was often a way for Philips to introduce its technology to the public. In 1950, a match between PSV and FC Eindhoven was the first televised match in the Netherlands, with Philips supplying the technique. And in 1958, Philips installed four floodlights in the stadium.

PSV's budget in 2011 was €60 million. Before 2011, PSV's budget would only remain balanced if the team would qualify for the UEFA Champions League every year. But disappointing performances since 2008 meant that the club ended up with a yearly €10–20 million negative balance, forcing the club to cut costs and obtain new revenues. The ground under the stadium and the training facilities were sold for €48.4 million to the Eindhoven municipality in a leasehold estate construction. PSV also took out a €20 million loan with Philips and additional loans with local entrepreneurs. The club also introduced sponsoring on the back of the player kits. Freo, part of De Lage Landen, was the company to present its name there.

On 21 April 2016, it was announced that Dutch energy company energiedirect.nl would replace Philips as PSV's kit sponsor, starting from the 2016–17 season. The company signed a contract for three seasons and paid €6 million per year. Philips continues to be a sponsor, but has decreased their contribution to €3 million per year. In 2019, it was announced that Philips, ASML, Jumbo, VDL and the High Tech Campus will jointly sponsor PSV in the coming years, under the name of ‘Metropoolregio Brainport Eindhoven’ (Brainport Eindhoven Metropolitan Area), which will be displayed on the shirt.

== Statistics and records ==
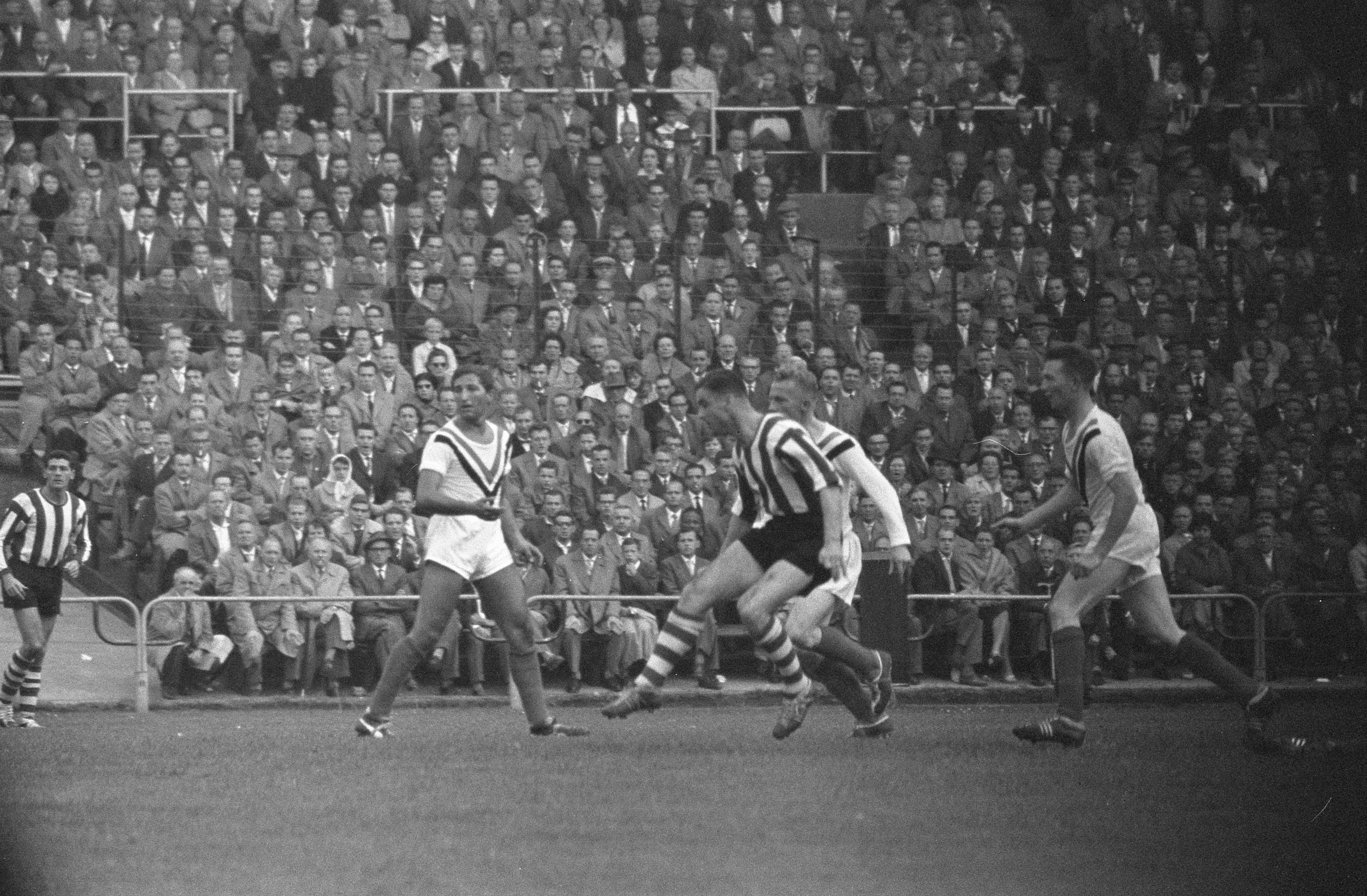
Coen Dillen playing for PSV in 1959. He scored 288 league goals for PSV, including 43 in the 1956–57 season – a domestic record until this day.

PSV's 27 league championships are the second-highest in Dutch football, behind Ajax (36). Their eleven KNVB Cup victories are the third-highest, after Ajax (20) and Feyenoord (14). PSV have also won the most Johan Cruyff Shields so far, with fifteen. The double was achieved four times, with the one in 1988 being part of the treble, a feat only achieved by eight other European clubs. Between 1985 and 1989, and between 2005 and 2008, PSV won the Eredivisie four times in a row; the only other clubs accomplishing this (once) were Ajax and HVV Den Haag. In recent decades, the team has been consistently competing for the top spots in the league: in the Eredivisie all-time standings (since 1956), PSV are second behind Ajax. PSV have played in a European competition every year since 1974; only Barcelona (since 1959) and Anderlecht (since 1964) have a longer streak in play.

Willy van der Kuijlen currently holds the record for the most league appearances and the most league goals. He played 528 matches and scored 308 goals between 1964 and 1981. Willy van de Kerkhof played the second-highest number of league matches for PSV; he appeared in 418 Eredivisie fixtures. The third-highest in the list is Jan Heintze with 395 games. The second-highest goalscorer for PSV is Coen Dillen, who produced 288 goals. Third in the list is Piet Fransen with 210 goals. The record for number of goals in one season stands at 43, scored by Dillen in the 1956–57 season; this figure is also a national record. Another domestic record is the number of consecutive minutes with a clean sheet. The number stands at 1,159 minutes, which PSV achieved in 2004 with two different goalkeepers: Heurelho Gomes and Edwin Zoetebier. The largest transfer fee PSV have ever received was for Ruud van Nistelrooy; Manchester United paid €30 million for the striker in 2001, closely followed by the €29 million paid by Manchester United for Memphis Depay in mid-2015. Mateja Kežman's move to PSV in 2000 was the most expensive incoming transfer; €11.3 million was paid to Partizan.

In 2010, PSV made international headlines when they humiliated former European champions Feyenoord 10–0. As of 4 January 2019, PSV had 1.85 million followers across all social media platforms.

== Honours ==
Type	Competition	Titles	Seasons
Domestic	Eredivisie	27	1928–29, 1934–35, 1950–51, 1962–63, 1974–75, 1975–76, 1977–78, 1985–86, 1986–87, 1987–88, 1988–89, 1990–91, 1991–92, 1996–97, 1999–2000, 2000–01, 2002–03, 2004–05, 2005–06, 2006–07, 2007–08, 2014–15, 2015–16, 2017–18, 2023–24, 2024–25, 2025–26
Domestic	KNVB Cup	11	1949–50, 1973–74, 1975–76, 1987–88, 1988–89, 1989–90, 1995–96, 2004–05, 2011–12, 2021–22, 2022–23
Domestic	Johan Cruyff Shield	15	1992, 1996, 1997, 1998, 2000, 2001, 2003, 2008, 2012, 2015, 2016, 2021, 2022, 2023, 2025
Continental	European Cup	1	1987–88
Continental	UEFA Cup	1	1977–78

- record

== Results ==
=== Domestic results ===
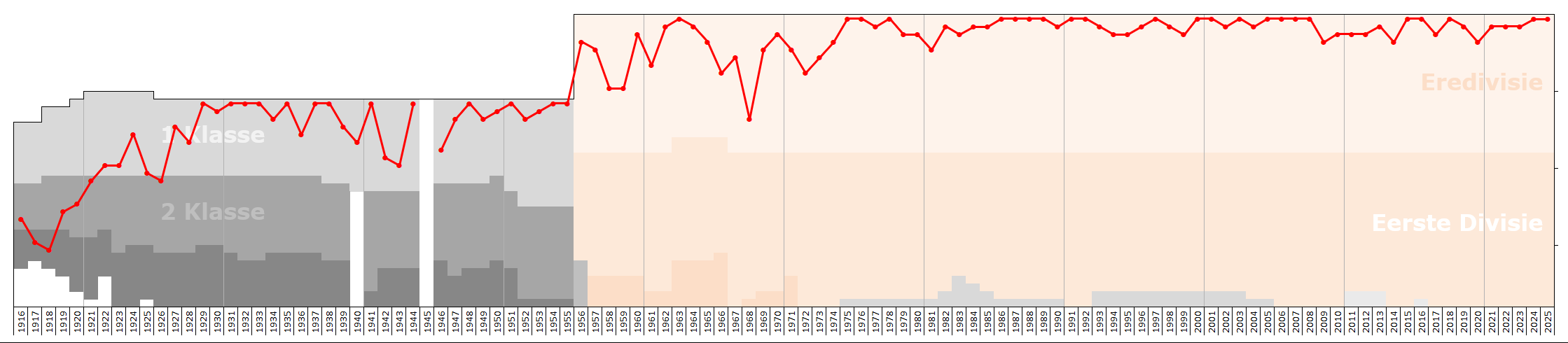
Historical chart of league performance

Below is a table with PSV's domestic results since the introduction of the Eredivisie in 1956.

Domestic results since 1956
Domestic league	League result	Qualification to	KNVB Cup season	Cup result
2025–26 Eredivisie	1st	Champions League	2025–26	semi-final
2024–25 Eredivisie	1st	Champions League	2024–25	semi-final
2023–24 Eredivisie	1st	Champions League	2023–24	round of 16
2022–23 Eredivisie	2nd	Champions League (Q3)	2022–23	winners
2021–22 Eredivisie	2nd	Champions League (Q3)	2021–22	winners
2020–21 Eredivisie	2nd	Champions League (Q2)	2020–21	quarter-final
2019–20 Eredivisie	4th	Europa League (Q3)	2019–20	round of 16
2018–19 Eredivisie	2nd	Champions League (Q2)	2018–19	second round
2017–18 Eredivisie	1st	Champions League (PO)	2017–18	quarter-final
2016–17 Eredivisie	3rd	Europa League (Q3)	2016–17	second round
2015–16 Eredivisie	1st	Champions League	2015–16	quarter-final
2014–15 Eredivisie	1st	Champions League	2014–15	round of 16
2013–14 Eredivisie	4th	Europa League (Q3)	2013–14	third round
2012–13 Eredivisie	2nd	Champions League (Q3)	2012–13	final
2011–12 Eredivisie	3rd	Europa League (Q4)	2011–12	winners
2010–11 Eredivisie	3rd	Europa League (Q4)	2010–11	quarter-final
2009–10 Eredivisie	3rd	Europa League (Q4)	2009–10	quarter-final
2008–09 Eredivisie	4th	Europa League (Q3)	2008–09	third round
2007–08 Eredivisie	1st	Champions League	2007–08	DSQ
2006–07 Eredivisie	1st	Champions League	2006–07	quarter-final
2005–06 Eredivisie	1st	Champions League	2005–06	final
2004–05 Eredivisie	1st	Champions League	2004–05	winners
2003–04 Eredivisie	2nd	Champions League (Q3)	2003–04	quarter-final
2002–03 Eredivisie	1st	Champions League	2002–03	semi-final
2001–02 Eredivisie	2nd	Champions League	2001–02	semi-final
2000–01 Eredivisie	1st	Champions League	2000–01	final
1999-00 Eredivisie	1st	Champions League	1999–2000	round of 16
1998–99 Eredivisie	3rd	Champions League (Q3)	1998–99	semi-final
1997–98 Eredivisie	2nd	Champions League (Q2)	1997–98	final
1996–97 Eredivisie	1st	Champions League	1996–97	round of 16
1995–96 Eredivisie	2nd	Cup Winners' Cup	1995–96	winners
1994–95 Eredivisie	3rd	UEFA Cup	1994–95	round of 16
1993–94 Eredivisie	3rd	UEFA Cup	1993–94	quarter-final
1992–93 Eredivisie	2nd	UEFA Cup	1992–93	quarter-final
1991–92 Eredivisie	1st	Champions League	1991–92	round of 16
1990–91 Eredivisie	1st	European Cup	1990–91	semi-final
1989–90 Eredivisie	2nd	Cup Winners' Cup	1989–90	winners
1988–89 Eredivisie	1st	European Cup	1988–89	winners
1987–88 Eredivisie	1st	European Cup (R2)	1987–88	winners
1986–87 Eredivisie	1st	European Cup	1986–87	round of 16
1985–86 Eredivisie	1st	European Cup	1985–86	second round
1984–85 Eredivisie	2nd	UEFA Cup	1984–85	semi-final
1983–84 Eredivisie	2nd	UEFA Cup	1983–84	quarter-final
1982–83 Eredivisie	3rd	UEFA Cup	1982–83	semi-final
1981–82 Eredivisie	2nd	UEFA Cup	1981–82	round of 16
1980–81 Eredivisie	5th	UEFA Cup	1980–81	semi-final
1979–80 Eredivisie	3rd	UEFA Cup	1979–80	semi-final
1978–79 Eredivisie	3rd	UEFA Cup	1978–79	semi-final
1977–78 Eredivisie	1st	European Cup	1977–78	round of 16
1976–77 Eredivisie	2nd	UEFA Cup	1976–77	quarter-final
1975–76 Eredivisie	1st	European Cup	1975–76	winners
1974–75 Eredivisie	1st	European Cup	1974–75	round of 16
1973–74 Eredivisie	4th	Cup Winners' Cup	1973–74	winners
1972–73 Eredivisie	6th	–	1972–73	quarter-final
1971–72 Eredivisie	8th	–	1971–72	round of 16
1970–71 Eredivisie	4th	UEFA Cup	1970–71	second round
1969–70 Eredivisie	3rd	Cup Winners' Cup	1969–70	final
1968–69 Eredivisie	5th	Cup Winners' Cup	1968–69	final
1967–68 Eredivisie	14th	–	1967–68	round of 16
1966–67 Eredivisie	6th	–	1966–67	first round
1965–66 Eredivisie	8th	–	1965–66	semi-final
1964–65 Eredivisie	4th	–	1964–65	second round
1963–64 Eredivisie	2nd	–	1963–64	first round
1962–63 Eredivisie	1st	European Cup	1962–63	third round
1961–62 Eredivisie	2nd	–	1961–62	?
1960–61 Eredivisie	7th	–	1960–61	?
1959–60 Eredivisie	3rd	–	not held	not held
1958–59 Eredivisie	10th	–	1958–59	?
1957–58 Eredivisie	10th	–	1957–58	?
1956–57 Eredivisie	5th	–	1956–57	?

== Players ==
=== First-team squad ===
As of 1 September 2026

Note: Flags indicate national team as defined under FIFA eligibility rules; some limited exceptions apply. Players may hold more than one non-FIFA nationality.

No.	Pos.	Nation	Player
1	GK	NED	Nick Olij
2	DF	NED	Lutsharel Geertruida (on loan from RB Leipzig)
3	DF	ESP	Yarek Gasiorowski
4	DF	CUW	Armando Obispo
5	MF	CRO	Ivan Perišić (3rd captain)
6	DF	NED	Ryan Flamingo
7	FW	NED	Ruben van Bommel
8	DF	USA	Sergiño Dest
9	FW	USA	Ricardo Pepi
10	MF	AUT	Paul Wanner
11	FW	NED	Sami Ouaissa
14	FW	FRA	Alassane Pléa
17	DF	BRA	Mauro Júnior (vice-captain)
18	MF	SRB	Filip Kostić
19	FW	BIH	Esmir Bajraktarević
20	MF	NED	Guus Til

No.	Pos.	Nation	Player
21	MF	NED	Sven Mijnans
22	MF	NED	Jerdy Schouten (captain)
23	FW	DEN	Mikkel Bro Hansen
24	MF	JPN	Kodai Sano
25	DF	FRA	Kiliann Sildillia
27	FW	ROU	Dennis Man
29	FW	NED	Sam Lammers
31	MF	BEL	Noah Fernandez
32	GK	CZE	Matěj Kovář
35	MF	CPV	Ayoni Santos
37	FW	MAR	Amir Bouhamdi
38	DF	NED	Fabian Merién
39	DF	BFA	Adamo Nagalo
42	MF	CUW	Shuryjano Cornecion
51	GK	NED	Tijn Smolenaars

=== Out on loan ===
Note: Flags indicate national team as defined under FIFA eligibility rules; some limited exceptions apply. Players may hold more than one non-FIFA nationality.

No.	Pos.	Nation	Player
—	GK	NED	Niek Schiks (at Waalwijk until 30 June 2027)
—	MF	NED	Isaac Babadi (at Sparta Rotterdam until 30 June 2027)

No.	Pos.	Nation	Player
—	MF	NED	Tygo Land (at Groningen until 30 June 2027)

=== Retired numbers ===
12 – Club Supporters (the 12th Man)

99 – Phoxy (Mascot)

== Personnel ==
=== Technical staff ===
Position	Staff
Head coach	(Netherlands) Peter Bosz
Assistant coach	(Netherlands) Rob Maas (Netherlands) Theo Lucius (Netherlands) Bas Sibum (Netherlands) Colin Bergmans
Goalkeeping coach	(Belgium) Kevin Begois
Video coaches	(Netherlands) John Feskens (Netherlands) Pier Tensen
Physiotherapists	(Netherlands) Leon Peters (Netherlands) Martin Cruijff (Netherlands) Maarten Brecko (Netherlands) Remie Blom
Team manager	(Netherlands) Bas Roorda
Material	(Netherlands) Martijn op den Buijs (Netherlands) Mike Sprengers

Last updated: 21 September 2026

=== Management ===
Position	Staff
Supervisory Board	(Netherlands) Robert van der Wallen (chairman) (Netherlands) Paul Verhagen (Netherlands) Ingrid Wolf-de Jonge (Denmark) Frank Arnesen (Netherlands) Klaas Dijkhoff
CEO	(Netherlands) Marcel Brands
Director of Football	(United States) Earnie Stewart
Director of Finance	(Netherlands) Jaap van Baar
Director of Commercial Affairs	(Netherlands) Frans Janssen

Last updated: 15 August 2022

== Former coaches ==
As of August 2025

Name	Nationality	From	To	Honours	Notes
Kees Meijnders	Netherlands	July 1914	June 1916	-	
Wout Buitenweg	Netherlands	July 1916	June 1921	-	
Jan Vos	Netherlands	July 1921	June 1922	-	
Herbert Leavey	England	July 1922	June 1926	-	
Ben Hoogstede	Netherlands	July 1926	June 1927	-	
Ignaz Klein	Netherlands	July 1927	June 1928	-	
Joop Klein Wentink	Netherlands	July 1928	June 1929	National Championship 1928–29	
Jack Hall	England	July 1929	June 1935	National Championship 1934–35	
Sam Wadsworth	England	July 1935	June 1938	-	
Jan van den Broek	Netherlands	July 1938	June 1942	-	
Coen Delsen	Netherlands	July 1942	June 1945	-	
Sam Wadsworth	England	July 1945	June 1951	KNVB Beker 1949–50, National Championship 1950–51	
Harry Topping	England	July 1951	June 1952	-	
Huib de Leeuw	Netherlands	July 1952	June 1956	-	
Ljubiša Broćić	Yugoslavia	July 1956	June 1957	-	
George Hardwick	England	July 1957	June 1958	-	
Kees van Dijke	Netherlands	July 1958	June 1959	-	
Ljubiša Bročić	Yugoslavia	July 1959	June 1960	-	
Franz Binder	Austria	July 1960	June 1962	-	
Bram Appel	Netherlands	July 1962	June 1967	Eredivisie 1962–63	
Milan Nikolić	Yugoslavia	July 1967	December 1967	-	
Wim Blokland	Netherlands	December 1967	June 1968	-	
Kurt Linder	Germany	July 1968	June 1972		
Kees Rijvers	Netherlands	July 1972	January 1980	Eredivisie 1974–75, 1975–76, 1977–78, KNVB Beker 1973–74, 1975–76, UEFA Cup 1977–78	
Jan Reker	Netherlands	January 1980	June 1980	-	(Note: Caretaker manager)
Thijs Libregts	Netherlands	July 1980	June 1983	-	
Jan Reker	Netherlands	July 1983	June 1986	Eredivisie 1985–86	
Hans Kraay	Netherlands	July 1986	March 1987	-	
Guus Hiddink	Netherlands	March 1987	June 1990	Eredivisie 1986–87, 1987–88, 1988–89, KNVB Beker 1987–88, 1988–89, 1989–90, European Cup 1987–88	
Bobby Robson	England	July 1990	June 1992	Eredivisie 1990–91, 1991–92	
Hans Westerhof	Netherlands	July 1992	June 1993	Super Cup 1992	
Aad de Mos	Netherlands	July 1993	September 1994	-	
Kees Rijvers	Netherlands	September 1995	December 1995	-	
Dick Advocaat	Netherlands	December 1994	June 1998	Eredivisie 1996–97, KNVB Cup 1995–96, Johan Cruyff Shield 1996, 1997	
Bobby Robson	England	July 1998	June 1999	Johan Cruyff Shield 1998	
Eric Gerets	Belgium	July 1999	June 2002	Eredivisie 1999–2000, 2000–01, Johan Cruyff Shield 2000, 2001	
Guus Hiddink	Netherlands	July 2002	June 2006	Eredivisie 2002–03, 2004–05, 2005–06, KNVB Cup 2004–05, Johan Cruyff Shield 2003	
Ronald Koeman	Netherlands	July 2006	October 2007	Eredivisie 2006–07	
Jan Wouters	Netherlands	November 2007	December 2007	-	
Sef Vergoossen	Netherlands	January 2008	June 2008	Eredivisie 2007–08	
Huub Stevens	Netherlands	July 2008	January 2009	Johan Cruyff Shield 2008	
Dwight Lodeweges	Netherlands	January 2009	June 2009	-	
Fred Rutten	Netherlands	July 2009	March 2012	-	
Phillip Cocu	Netherlands	March 2012	June 2012	KNVB Cup 2011–12	
Dick Advocaat	Netherlands	July 2012	June 2013	Johan Cruyff Shield 2012	
Phillip Cocu	Netherlands	July 2013	June 2018	Eredivisie 2014–15, 2015–16, 2017–18, Johan Cruijff Shield 2015, 2016	
Mark van Bommel	Netherlands	June 2018	December 2019	-	
Ernest Faber	Netherlands	December 2019	April 2020	-	
Roger Schmidt	Germany	April 2020	June 2022	Johan Cruyff Shield 2021, KNVB Cup 2021–22	
Ruud van Nistelrooy	Netherlands	July 2022	May 2023	Johan Cruyff Shield 2022, KNVB Cup 2022–23	
Fred Rutten	Netherlands	May 2023	June 2023	-	
Peter Bosz	Netherlands	July 2023		Eredivisie 2023–24, 2024–25, 2025–26, Johan Cruyff Shield 2023, 2025	

== Former captains ==
Dates	Name	Notes
1983–1985	(Norway) Hallvar Thoresen	
1985	(Netherlands) Willy van de Kerkhof	
1985–1987	(Netherlands) Ruud Gullit	
1987–1991	(Belgium) Eric Gerets	
1991–1993	(Netherlands) Gerald Vanenburg	
1993–1994	(Netherlands) Erwin Koeman	
1994–1995	(Netherlands) Jan Wouters	
1995–1998	(Netherlands) Arthur Numan	
1998–2000	(Belgium) Luc Nilis	
2000–2005	(Netherlands) Mark van Bommel	
2005–2007	(Netherlands) Phillip Cocu	
2007–2010	(Belgium) Timmy Simons	
2010	(Netherlands) Ibrahim Afellay	
2010–2011	(Netherlands) Orlando Engelaar	
2011–2012	(Sweden) Ola Toivonen	
2012–2013	(Netherlands) Mark van Bommel	
2013–2015	(Netherlands) Georginio Wijnaldum	
2015–2017	(Netherlands) Luuk de Jong	
2017–2018	(Netherlands) Marco van Ginkel	
2018–2019	(Netherlands) Luuk de Jong	
2019–2020	(Netherlands) Ibrahim Afellay	
2020–2021	(Netherlands) Denzel Dumfries	
2021–2022	(Netherlands) Marco van Ginkel	
2022–2025	(Netherlands) Luuk de Jong	
2025–	(Netherlands) Jerdy Schouten	

== Notable fans ==
- Tijs van den Brink, television presenter
- Klaas Dijkhoff, politician
- Sander van Doorn, DJ
- Willibrord Frequin, former television presenter
- Fresku, rapper
- Cees Geel, actor
- Michael van Gerwen, darter
- Pieter van den Hoogenband, former Olympic champion swimmer
- John van den Heuvel, crime journalist
- Kempi, rapper
- Frank Lammers, actor
- Wim van der Leegte, former president of VDL Groep
- Theo Maassen, comedian
- Guus Meeuwis, singer
- Bas Muijs, actor
- Frits Philips, former CEO of BOD of Philips
- Gert-Jan Segers, politician
- Jos Verstappen, former Formula One driver
- Max Verstappen, Formula One driver
- Lucille Werner, television presenter
- Giel de Winter, YouTuber/television presenter
- Ashafar, rapper
- Robbie van de Graaf, YouTuber/ bankzitter

== See also ==
- Works team
- List of world champion football clubs and vice-world champions in football
