= 1950–51 Netherlands Football League Championship =

Netherl. Football Championship
- Season: 1950–1951
- Champions: PSV Eindhoven (3rd title)

The Netherlands Football League Championship 1950–1951 was contested by 60 teams participating in five divisions. The national champion would be determined by a play-off featuring the winners of each division of the Netherlands. PSV Eindhoven won this year's championship by beating DWS, Willem II, Blauw-Wit Amsterdam and sc Heerenveen.

At the end of this season, the KNVB re-aligned the current system of Divisions into 4 new Divisions for 1951–52, to be called Eerste Klasse A-D.

== New entrants ==
This season, there was one division less than in the last one; this meant that all teams had to be reassigned.

Eerste Klasse A:

- Moving in from Division East: Go Ahead and Zwolsche Boys
- Moving in from Division North: Achilles 1894, Be Quick 1887, LAC Frisia 1883, GVAV Rapiditas, sc Heerenveen, HSC VV Leeuwarden, Sneek Wit Zwart and Velocitas 1897
- Promoted from 2nd Division: VV Zwartemeer

Eerste Klasse B:

- Moving in from Division East: AGOVV Apeldoorn, Enschedese Boys, Heracles, HVV Hengelo, NEC Nijmegen, SC Enschede and FC Wageningen
- Moving in from Division West-I: DOS
- Moving in from Division West-II: AFC Ajax, DWS and HVV 't Gooi
- Promoted from 2nd Division: Vitesse Arnhem

Eerste Klasse C:

- Moving in from Division West-I: ADO Den Haag, Blauw-Wit Amsterdam, HFC Haarlem, Hermes DVS, KFC and VSV
- Moving in from Division West-II: HFC EDO, HBS Craeyenhout, RCH, SVV and De Volewijckers
- Promoted from 2nd Division: DWV

Eerste Klasse D:

- Moving in from Division South-I: NOAD and RBC Roosendaal
- Moving in from Division South-II: BVV Den Bosch, NOAD, NAC, TSC and Willem II
- Moving in from West-I: Feijenoord, Sparta Rotterdam
- Moving in from West-II: Xerxes
- Promoted form 2nd Division: De Baronie & Emma

Eerste Klasse E:

- Moving in from Division South-I: Brabantia, SC Helmondia, MVV Maastricht, PSV Eindhoven, SV Limburgia and VVV Venlo
- Moving in from Division South-II: Bleijerheide, FC Eindhoven, SC Emma and Maurits
- Promoted from 2nd Division: VV Chèvremont & Sittardia

== Divisions ==
=== Eerste Klasse A ===
| Pos | Team | Pld | W | D | L | GF | GA | GD | Pts | Qualification or relegation |
|---|---|---|---|---|---|---|---|---|---|---|
| 1 | sc Heerenveen | 22 | 19 | 0 | 3 | 97 | 33 | +64 | 38 | Qualified for Championship play-off |
| 2 | VV Leeuwarden | 22 | 13 | 1 | 8 | 69 | 57 | +12 | 27 | Transferred to Eerste B |
| 3 | Go Ahead | 22 | 12 | 3 | 7 | 44 | 40 | +4 | 27 | |
| 4 | Be Quick 1887 | 22 | 12 | 2 | 8 | 51 | 39 | +12 | 26 | Transferred to Eerste B |
| 5 | GVAV Rapiditas | 22 | 10 | 5 | 7 | 42 | 32 | +10 | 25 | |
| 6 | Sneek Wit Zwart | 22 | 10 | 2 | 10 | 45 | 40 | +5 | 22 | Transferred to Eerste B |
| 7 | LAC Frisia 1883 | 22 | 8 | 5 | 9 | 44 | 42 | +2 | 21 | |
| 8 | Zwolsche Boys | 22 | 8 | 2 | 12 | 37 | 45 | −8 | 18 | Transferred to Eerste B |
| 9 | Achilles 1894 | 22 | 7 | 3 | 12 | 34 | 54 | −20 | 17 | Transferred to Eerste B |
| 10 | VV Zwartemeer | 22 | 6 | 3 | 13 | 27 | 54 | −27 | 15 | Relegated to 2nd Division |
| 11 | Velocitas 1897 | 22 | 5 | 5 | 12 | 28 | 58 | −30 | 15 | |
| 12 | HSC | 22 | 5 | 3 | 14 | 34 | 58 | −24 | 13 | Relegated to 2nd Division |

Source: rsssf.com

=== Eerste Klasse B ===
| Pos | Team | Pld | W | D | L | GF | GA | GD | Pts | Qualification or relegation |
|---|---|---|---|---|---|---|---|---|---|---|
| 1 | DWS | 22 | 11 | 7 | 4 | 28 | 15 | +13 | 29 | Qualified for Championship play-off and transferred to Eerste A |
| 2 | FC Wageningen | 22 | 11 | 7 | 4 | 33 | 23 | +10 | 29 | |
| 3 | AGOVV Apeldoorn | 22 | 11 | 3 | 8 | 40 | 35 | +5 | 25 | Transferred to Eerste A |
| 4 | Enschedese Boys | 22 | 8 | 8 | 6 | 34 | 26 | +8 | 24 | Transferred to Eerste A |
| 5 | HVV 't Gooi | 22 | 7 | 9 | 6 | 30 | 27 | +3 | 23 | Transferred to Eerste A |
| 6 | NEC Nijmegen | 22 | 7 | 7 | 8 | 26 | 30 | −4 | 21 | Transferred to Eerste D |
| 7 | SC Enschede | 22 | 8 | 5 | 9 | 26 | 32 | −6 | 21 | |
| 8 | AFC Ajax | 22 | 7 | 7 | 8 | 31 | 40 | −9 | 21 | |
| 9 | Vitesse | 22 | 6 | 8 | 8 | 33 | 29 | +4 | 20 | |
| 10 | DOS | 22 | 7 | 6 | 9 | 31 | 29 | +2 | 20 | |
| 11 | Heracles | 22 | 6 | 6 | 10 | 28 | 35 | −7 | 18 | Relegated to 2nd Division |
| 12 | HVV Hengelo | 22 | 4 | 5 | 13 | 20 | 39 | −19 | 13 | Relegated to 2nd Division |

Source: rsssf.com

=== Eerste Klasse C ===
| Pos | Team | Pld | W | D | L | GF | GA | GD | Pts | Qualification or relegation |
|---|---|---|---|---|---|---|---|---|---|---|
| 1 | Blauw-Wit Amsterdam | 22 | 14 | 4 | 4 | 51 | 26 | +25 | 32 | Qualified for Championship play-off and transferred to Eerste B |
| 2 | HFC Haarlem | 22 | 13 | 4 | 5 | 56 | 34 | +22 | 30 | Transferred to Eerste A |
| 3 | SVV | 22 | 11 | 4 | 7 | 43 | 40 | +3 | 26 | |
| 4 | Hermes DVS | 22 | 10 | 4 | 8 | 50 | 36 | +14 | 24 | Transferred to Eerste D |
| 5 | HFC EDO | 22 | 9 | 6 | 7 | 28 | 31 | −3 | 24 | Transferred to Eerste A |
| 6 | ADO Den Haag | 22 | 10 | 3 | 9 | 32 | 27 | +5 | 23 | |
| 7 | HBS Craeyenhout | 22 | 9 | 4 | 9 | 54 | 46 | +8 | 22 | Transferred to Eerste D |
| 8 | RCH | 22 | 8 | 5 | 9 | 35 | 35 | 0 | 21 | Transferred to Eerste B |
| 9 | De Volewijckers | 22 | 8 | 5 | 9 | 37 | 41 | −4 | 21 | Transferred to Eerste A |
| 10 | VSV | 22 | 7 | 3 | 12 | 25 | 38 | −13 | 17 | Transferred to Eerste B |
| 11 | DWV | 22 | 5 | 5 | 12 | 26 | 47 | −21 | 15 | Relegated to 2nd Division |
| 12 | KFC | 22 | 3 | 3 | 16 | 27 | 63 | −36 | 9 | Relegated to 2nd Division |

Source: rsssf.com

=== Eerste Klasse D ===
| Pos | Team | Pld | W | D | L | GF | GA | GD | Pts | Qualification or relegation |
|---|---|---|---|---|---|---|---|---|---|---|
| 1 | Willem II | 22 | 16 | 3 | 3 | 67 | 27 | +40 | 35 | Qualified for Championship play-off and transferred to Eerste C |
| 2 | BVV Den Bosch | 22 | 15 | 3 | 4 | 58 | 26 | +32 | 33 | Transferred to Eerste C |
| 3 | Emma | 22 | 10 | 8 | 4 | 57 | 43 | +14 | 28 | |
| 4 | RBC Roosendaal | 22 | 11 | 5 | 6 | 49 | 40 | +9 | 27 | Transferred to Eerste C |
| 5 | NAC | 22 | 10 | 4 | 8 | 27 | 32 | −5 | 24 | Transferred to Eerste C |
| 6 | LONGA | 22 | 9 | 4 | 9 | 38 | 28 | +10 | 22 | |
| 7 | Xerxes | 22 | 9 | 4 | 9 | 57 | 52 | +5 | 22 | |
| 8 | Feijenoord | 22 | 7 | 8 | 7 | 31 | 32 | −1 | 22 | Transferred to Eerste C |
| 9 | Sparta Rotterdam | 22 | 7 | 3 | 12 | 33 | 36 | −3 | 17 | |
| 10 | NOAD | 22 | 5 | 6 | 11 | 25 | 43 | −18 | 16 | |
| 11 | TSC | 22 | 3 | 7 | 12 | 27 | 57 | −30 | 13 | Relegated to 2nd Division |
| 12 | De Baronie | 22 | 1 | 3 | 18 | 23 | 76 | −53 | 5 | Relegated to 2nd Division |

Source: rsssf.com

=== Eerste Klasse E ===
| Pos | Team | Pld | W | D | L | GF | GA | GD | Pts | Qualification or relegation |
|---|---|---|---|---|---|---|---|---|---|---|
| 1 | PSV Eindhoven | 22 | 17 | 3 | 2 | 52 | 18 | +34 | 37 | Qualified for Championship play-off and transferred to Eerste D |
| 2 | FC Eindhoven | 22 | 13 | 6 | 3 | 64 | 26 | +38 | 32 | Transferred to Eerste C |
| 3 | Limburgia | 22 | 9 | 6 | 7 | 45 | 37 | +8 | 24 | Transferred to Eerste D |
| 4 | VVV Venlo | 22 | 9 | 5 | 8 | 47 | 37 | +10 | 23 | Transferred to Eerste D |
| 5 | Sittardia | 22 | 7 | 7 | 8 | 46 | 47 | −1 | 21 | Transferred to Eerste C |
| 6 | MVV Maastricht | 22 | 7 | 7 | 8 | 39 | 41 | −2 | 21 | Transferred to Eerste C |
| 7 | Maurits | 22 | 7 | 7 | 8 | 40 | 43 | −3 | 21 | Transferred to Eerste D |
| 8 | Bleijerheide | 22 | 7 | 7 | 8 | 22 | 25 | −3 | 21 | Transferred to Eerste C |
| 9 | Brabantia | 22 | 6 | 5 | 11 | 29 | 31 | −2 | 17 | Transferred to Eerste D |
| 10 | VV Chèvremont | 22 | 6 | 5 | 11 | 32 | 51 | −19 | 17 | Transferred to Eerste D |
| 11 | SC Emma | 22 | 7 | 2 | 13 | 26 | 52 | −26 | 16 | Relegated to 2nd Division |
| 12 | SC Helmondia | 22 | 5 | 4 | 13 | 28 | 62 | −34 | 14 | Relegated to 2nd Division |

Source: rsssf.com

=== Championship play-off ===
| Pos | Team | Pld | W | D | L | GF | GA | GD | Pts | Result | PSV | DWS | WIL | BWA | HEE |
|---|---|---|---|---|---|---|---|---|---|---|---|---|---|---|---|
| 1 | PSV Eindhoven | 8 | 6 | 1 | 1 | 22 | 11 | +11 | 13 | Champion | | 6–1 | 2–1 | 3–0 | 2–0 |
| 2 | DWS | 8 | 5 | 0 | 3 | 23 | 18 | +5 | 10 | | 2–3 | | 4–0 | 3–0 | 4–2 |
| 3 | Willem II | 8 | 4 | 1 | 3 | 18 | 16 | +2 | 9 | | 2–2 | 2–4 | | 2–1 | 7–2 |
| 4 | Blauw-Wit Amsterdam | 8 | 4 | 0 | 4 | 14 | 13 | +1 | 8 | | 3–1 | 3–1 | 1–2 | | 3–1 |
| 5 | sc Heerenveen | 8 | 0 | 0 | 8 | 9 | 28 | −19 | 0 | | 2–3 | 2–4 | 0–2 | 0–3 | |

Source: rsssf.com
