= 1934–35 Netherlands Football League Championship =

Netherl. Football Championship
- Season: 1934–1935
- Champions: PSV Eindhoven (2nd title)

The Netherlands Football League Championship 1934–1935 was contested by 50 teams participating in five divisions. The national champion would be determined by a play-off featuring the winners of the eastern, northern, southern and two western football divisions of the Netherlands. PSV won this year's championship by beating Go Ahead, AFC Ajax, Velocitas 1897 and DWS.

== New entrants ==
Eerste Klasse East:

- Promoted from 2nd Division: ZAC

Eerste Klasse North:

- Promoted from 2nd Division: HSC

Eerste Klasse South:

- Promoted from 2nd Division: Juliana

Eerste Klasse West-I:

- Moving in from West-II: DFC, RCH, VUC and Xerxes
- Promoted from 2nd Division: Overmaas Rotterdam

Eerste Klasse West-II:

- Moving in from West-I: HFC Haarlem, Hermes DVS, Sparta Rotterdam and ZFC
- Promoted from 2nd Division: DWS

== Divisions ==
=== Eerste Klasse East ===
Pos	Team	Pld	W	D	L	GF	GA	GD	Pts	Qualification or relegation
1	Go Ahead	18	16	0	2	55	15	+40	32	Qualified for Championship play-off
2	Heracles	18	11	4	3	50	21	+29	26	
3	PEC Zwolle	18	8	1	9	32	30	+2	17	
4	ZAC	18	7	3	8	38	44	−6	17	
5	SC Enschede	18	7	2	9	38	41	−3	16	
6	Enschedese Boys	18	7	2	9	48	61	−13	16	
7	HVV Tubantia	18	8	0	10	35	48	−13	16	
8	FC Wageningen	18	6	3	9	33	42	−9	15	
9	AGOVV Apeldoorn	18	6	2	10	37	53	−16	14	
10	Vitesse Arnhem	18	4	3	11	39	50	−11	11	Relegated to 2nd Division

Source: rsssf.com

=== Eerste Klasse North ===
Pos	Team	Pld	W	D	L	GF	GA	GD	Pts	Qualification or relegation
1	Velocitas 1897	18	14	3	1	103	34	+69	31	Qualified for Championship play-off
2	GVAV Rapiditas	18	12	3	3	64	32	+32	27	
3	Be Quick 1887	18	9	4	5	55	35	+20	22	
4	Veendam	18	8	3	7	50	45	+5	19	
5	HSC	18	7	4	7	59	54	+5	18	
6	Sneek Wit Zwart	18	6	3	9	31	52	−21	15	
7	VV Leeuwarden	18	6	2	10	35	59	−24	14	
8	LVV Friesland	18	6	1	11	32	60	−28	13	
9	Achilles 1894	18	4	3	11	27	52	−25	11	
10	LAC Frisia 1883	18	3	4	11	35	68	−33	10	Relegated to 2nd Division

Source: rsssf.com

=== Eerste Klasse South ===
Pos	Team	Pld	W	D	L	GF	GA	GD	Pts	Qualification or relegation
1	PSV Eindhoven	18	13	3	2	50	18	+32	29	Qualified for Championship play-off
2	NAC	18	11	5	2	55	29	+26	27	
3	LONGA	18	7	5	6	41	40	+1	19	
4	Juliana	18	6	7	5	35	37	−2	19	
5	BVV Den Bosch	18	8	3	7	40	44	−4	19	
6	FC Eindhoven	18	6	4	8	37	42	−5	16	
7	Bleijerheide	18	5	4	9	26	43	−17	14	
8	MVV Maastricht	18	4	5	9	26	29	−3	13	
9	NOAD	18	5	3	10	31	48	−17	13	
10	Willem II	18	4	3	11	26	37	−11	11	Relegated to 2nd Division

Source: rsssf.com

=== Eerste Klasse West-I ===
Pos	Team	Pld	W	D	L	GF	GA	GD	Pts	Qualification or relegation
1	AFC Ajax	18	14	2	2	66	15	+51	30	Qualified for Championship play-off
2	Feijenoord	18	13	2	3	53	32	+21	28	Division West-II next season
3	DHC Delft	18	9	4	5	48	37	+11	22	Division West-II next season
4	ADO Den Haag	18	9	3	6	51	40	+11	21	
5	VSV	18	7	2	9	58	54	+4	16	
6	Xerxes	18	5	4	9	42	54	−12	14	
7	VUC	18	6	2	10	36	56	−20	14	Division West-II next season
8	Koninklijke HFC	18	6	1	11	43	56	−13	13	Division West-II next season
9	RCH	18	4	4	10	31	52	−21	12	
10	Overmaas Rotterdam	18	5	0	13	43	75	−32	10	Relegated to 2nd Division

Source: rsssf.com

=== Eerste Klasse West-II ===
Pos	Team	Pld	W	D	L	GF	GA	GD	Pts	Qualification
1	DWS	18	9	5	4	34	24	+10	23	Qualified for Championship play-off
2	Hermes DVS	18	8	6	4	25	18	+7	22	Division West-I next season
3	HFC Haarlem	18	9	4	5	47	34	+13	22	Division West-I next season
4	KFC	18	8	5	5	25	21	+4	21	Division West-I next season
5	Stormvogels	18	5	8	5	20	23	−3	18	
6	SBV Excelsior	18	6	6	6	27	32	−5	18	
7	DFC	18	6	3	9	29	30	−1	15	
8	Sparta Rotterdam	18	6	3	9	27	32	−5	15	Division West-I next season
9	ZFC	18	6	2	10	26	36	−10	14	
10	HBS Craeyenhout	18	5	2	11	31	41	−10	12	Division West-I next season

Source: rsssf.com

=== Championship play-off ===
Pos	Team	Pld	W	D	L	GF	GA	GD	Pts	PSV	GOA	AJA	VEL	DWS
1	PSV Eindhoven	8	6	1	1	23	12	+11	13		4–4	4–1	2–1	5–0
2	Go Ahead	8	5	2	1	16	10	+6	12	1–0		2–1	1–3	1–0
3	AFC Ajax	8	4	0	4	12	12	0	8	2–3	0–1		4–2	2–0
4	Velocitas 1897	8	2	1	5	12	16	−4	5	2–3	0–4	0–1		4–1
5	DWS	8	0	2	6	4	17	−13	2	1–2	2–2	0–1	0–0	

Source: rsssf.com
