= Sef Vergoossen =

Dutch football manager (born 1947)

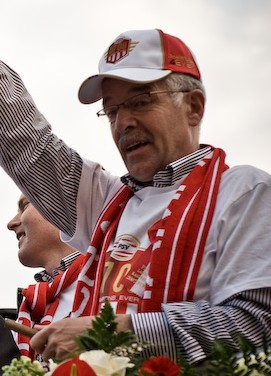
- Vergoossen in 2008

Personal information
- Date of birth: 5 August 1947 (age 79)
- Place of birth: Echt, Netherlands

Managerial career
- Years: Team
- 1978–1989: VVV-Venlo
- 1989–1998: MVV
- 1998–2001: Roda JC
- 2001–2004: Racing Genk
- 2004–2005: Al-Jazeera Club
- 2006–2007: Nagoya Grampus Eight
- 2008: PSV Eindhoven

Josephus Gerardus Dominicus "Sef" Vergoossen (Dutch pronunciation: [sɛ ˈfɛrɣoːsə(n)]; (Note: In isolation, Sef and Vergoossen are pronounced [sɛf] and [ˈvɛrɣoːsə(n)].) born 5 August 1947) is a Dutch former football manager.

== Career ==
Vergoossen began his managerial career in 1978 with VVV-Venlo, managing the club for 12 years until 1989, after which he managed MVV for nine years and Roda JC for three years, whom he led to victory in the 1999–2000 KNVB Cup. Subsequently, he managed Belgian giants Racing Genk between 2001 and 2004, winning the Manager of the Year award at the Belgian professional football awards in 2001–02.

In 2006, Vergoosen moved to Japan and managed Nagoya Grampus Eight, which had previously been successfully managed by former Arsenal manager Arsène Wenger. In January 2008, Vergoossen was appointed interim manager of PSV Eindhoven, whom he led to winning the 2007–08 Eredivisie title. After his successful tenure at PSV ended, Vergoossen moved on to work for his previous club Genk as an advisor on a part-time basis. In January 2009, after his successor Huub Stevens resigned at PSV, Vergoosen was named as one of the top candidates for the managerial role, having successfully led the side to the Eredivisie title the previous season.

On 10 August 2022, Vergoossen returned to Roda JC to advise supervisory directors in the field of football technical matters.

== Managerial statistics ==
Team	From	To	Record				
Team	From	To	G	W	D	L	Win %
Nagoya Grampus Eight	2006	2007	68	26	15	27	38.24
Total			68	26	15	27	38.24

== Honours ==
Roda JC

- KNVB Cup: 1999–2000

Genk

- Belgian First Division: 2001–02
- Jules Pappaert Cup: 2001–02

PSV Eindhoven

- Eredivisie: 2007–08

Individual

- Belgian Professional Manager of the Year: 2001–02
