= 1985–86 Eredivisie =

30th season of the Eredivisie

Eredivisie
- Season: 1985–86
- Champions: PSV Eindhoven (8th title)
- Promoted: VVV-Venlo; NEC; SC Heracles
- Relegated: MVV; NEC; SC Heracles
- European Cup: PSV Eindhoven
- Cup Winners' Cup: AFC Ajax
- UEFA Cup: Feyenoord; FC Groningen
- Goals: 952
- Average goals/game: 3.11
- Top goalscorer: (Netherlands) Marco van Basten; AFC Ajax 37 goals

The Dutch Eredivisie in the 1985–86 season was contested by 18 teams. PSV won the championship.

== League standings ==
Pos	Team	Pld	W	D	L	GF	GA	GD	Pts	Qualification or relegation
1	PSV	34	27	6	1	100	22	+78	60	Qualified for 1986–87 European Cup
2	Ajax	34	25	2	7	120	35	+85	52	Qualified for 1986–87 European Cup Winners' Cup
3	Feyenoord	34	19	6	9	74	50	+24	44	Qualified for 1986–87 UEFA Cup
4	FC Groningen	34	17	6	11	57	40	+17	40	Qualified for 1986–87 UEFA Cup
5	Roda JC	34	16	7	11	76	51	+25	39	
6	FC Den Bosch	34	13	11	10	50	41	+9	37	
7	Sparta	34	13	11	10	54	59	−5	37	
8	Fortuna Sittard	34	11	12	11	47	47	0	34	
9	AZ '67	34	11	12	11	40	55	−15	34	
10	Go Ahead Eagles	34	13	7	14	47	62	−15	33	
11	Haarlem	34	10	12	12	48	47	+1	32	
12	FC Utrecht	34	11	10	13	40	46	−6	32	
13	FC VVV	34	11	5	18	39	62	−23	27	
14	FC Twente	34	8	11	15	36	69	−33	27	
15	Excelsior	34	9	7	18	31	48	−17	25	
16	MVV	34	8	8	18	34	60	−26	24	Relegated to Eerste Divisie
17	NEC	34	9	5	20	33	59	−26	23	Relegated to Eerste Divisie
18	SC Heracles	34	3	6	25	26	99	−73	12	Relegated to Eerste Divisie

Source: rsssf.com

== Results ==
Home \ Away	AJA	AZ	DBO	EXC	FEY	FSI	GAE	GRO	HFC	HER	MVV	NEC	PSV	RJC	SPA	TWE	UTR	VVV
Ajax		8–2	4–1	3–0	1–2	4–1	5–0	1–0	5–1	7–0	2–1	2–0	2–4	6–0	9–0	6–0	3–0	7–1
AZ '67	1–2		1–4	1–0	2–2	1–1	2–1	1–1	1–1	2–0	2–1	1–0	0–1	4–3	0–1	1–0	4–1	0–0
FC Den Bosch '67	0–3	0–0		0–0	1–1	2–2	1–0	1–0	3–0	4–0	4–3	2–0	2–0	2–2	0–0	2–1	1–1	4–0
Excelsior	2–3	1–0	1–1		2–1	3–0	0–1	1–2	0–0	3–0	1–0	3–0	0–1	0–1	1–3	2–2	0–1	0–0
Feyenoord	3–1	3–4	1–1	2–1		3–1	5–0	4–1	2–0	5–1	1–2	1–0	2–3	1–0	4–3	2–1	2–0	2–3
Fortuna Sittard	1–4	1–1	0–2	3–0	1–1		4–0	2–1	4–0	1–0	3–2	0–2	2–2	2–1	0–0	2–1	1–1	1–1
Go Ahead Eagles	1–2	1–1	2–1	4–0	1–3	1–0		2–1	0–0	2–2	3–1	3–1	1–3	3–1	0–0	3–3	4–3	2–1
FC Groningen	2–1	1–0	1–0	2–0	4–1	3–0	3–1		3–0	1–0	3–1	2–0	1–6	3–2	2–2	5–1	0–0	3–4
FC Haarlem	1–2	2–3	4–1	2–3	1–1	0–0	2–1	0–3		5–2	1–1	4–1	0–2	0–0	1–2	3–0	3–0	6–3
SC Heracles '74	1–8	1–1	0–3	1–2	2–5	0–3	1–0	0–4	2–2		0–2	2–2	0–2	1–8	0–0	0–0	2–3	0–2
MVV	1–4	0–0	2–1	2–1	1–1	1–1	0–2	0–0	0–2	1–0		0–1	0–6	1–1	4–2	0–0	2–1	3–1
N.E.C.	0–0	1–1	1–2	0–1	3–1	0–0	0–3	2–1	0–2	3–0	1–1		2–5	1–2	1–0	0–2	1–2	1–0
PSV	1–1	4–0	2–1	4–0	5–0	2–1	8–2	0–0	1–0	5–0	3–0	2–0		5–0	1–1	4–0	1–1	3–0
Roda JC	2–1	6–0	0–0	3–1	2–0	2–3	5–0	2–0	0–0	4–1	3–0	6–1	1–4		2–0	5–0	3–3	3–1
Sparta Rotterdam	3–1	0–0	3–0	3–1	2–5	2–2	2–1	3–3	0–4	6–1	1–0	3–2	1–1	2–4		2–0	3–2	1–3
FC Twente	1–8	2–1	2–1	1–1	0–4	3–1	0–0	1–0	0–0	0–3	4–1	1–2	1–3	1–1	2–2		2–1	1–0
FC Utrecht	1–0	1–2	1–1	0–0	0–2	1–0	0–0	1–0	0–0	0–2	3–0	4–1	0–3	2–0	2–0	2–2		2–0
VVV	1–4	4–0	3–1	1–0	0–1	0–3	1–2	0–1	1–1	3–1	1–0	0–3	0–3	2–1	0–1	1–1	1–0	

Legend: Blue = home team win; Yellow = draw; Red = away team win.

== Attendances ==
No.	Club	Average	Change	Highest
1	PSV	18,376	18,1%	26,500
2	AFC Ajax	14,700	10,3%	42,000
3	Feyenoord	13,957	-18,6%	38,257
4	FC Groningen	10,582	-15,6%	20,500
5	VVV	7,076	17,5%	13,000
6	Fortuna Sittard	6,985	-3,9%	11,000
7	FC Utrecht	6,924	-6,8%	19,500
8	FC Den Bosch	6,315	11,1%	19,326
9	FC Twente	6,265	-30,0%	11,300
10	Roda JC	5,506	-4,5%	9,500
11	Heracles	5,206	32,1%	12,000
12	Go Ahead Eagles	4,882	4,4%	13,500
13	NEC	4,106	67,8%	14,500
14	Sparta	3,691	-19,3%	14,000
15	MVV Maastricht	3,656	-21,1%	7,800
16	Excelsior	3,481	16,7%	14,675
17	AZ '67	3,272	-14,9%	12,000
18	HFC Haarlem	3,024	-28,9%	7,000

== See also ==
- 1985–86 Eerste Divisie
- 1985–86 KNVB Cup
