= Fred Rutten =

Dutch football player and manager

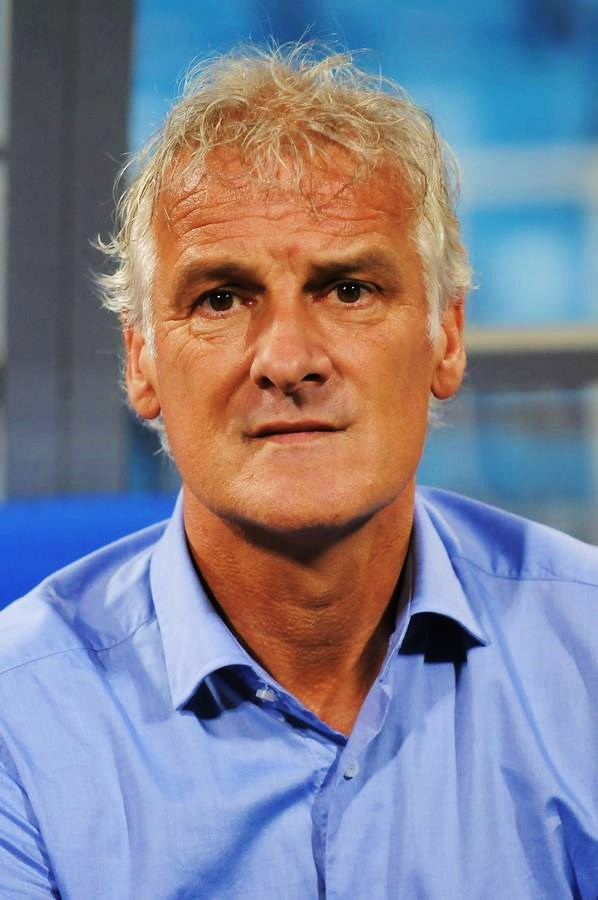
- Rutten in 2014

Personal information
- Full name: Fredericus Jacobus Rutten
- Date of birth: 5 December 1962 (age 63)
- Place of birth: Wijchen, Netherlands
- Height: 1.80 m (5 ft 11 in)
- Position: Defender

Youth career
- –1977: VV Alverna
- 1977–1979: Twente

Senior career*
Years	Team	Apps	(Gls)
1979–1992	Twente	317	(11)

International career
1988	Netherlands	1	(0)

Managerial career
- 1999–2001: Twente
- 2006–2008: Twente
- 2008–2009: Schalke 04
- 2009–2012: PSV
- 2012–2013: Vitesse
- 2014–2015: Feyenoord
- 2016–2017: Al Shabab
- 2018: Maccabi Haifa
- 2019: Anderlecht
- 2023: PSV (caretaker)
- 2026: Curaçao
- * Club domestic league appearances and goals

Fredericus Jacobus Rutten (Dutch pronunciation: [freːdəˈrikʏ ɕaːˈkoːbʏs frɛt ˈrʏtə(n)]; born 5 December 1962) is a Dutch football coach and former player, who has most recently been the manager of the Curaçao national team. As a player, he spent his entire career with Twente during the years 1979 to 1992. Following his playing career, Rutten also managed Twente, before moving on to clubs like Schalke 04, PSV Eindhoven, SBV Vitesse, Feyenoord, Al Shabab, Maccabi Haifa and more recently Anderlecht.

== Coaching career ==
Rutten has managed Twente (assistant manager, manager and technical director) and PSV Eindhoven (youth coach and assistant manager). In the summer of 2008, he took over as head coach of Bundesliga club Schalke 04. On 26 March 2009, Rutten was sacked as Schalke manager.

On 17 April 2009, Rutten signed a contract as the new manager of PSV Eindhoven, for the season 2009–10. During the 2009–10 competition Rutten's side remained undefeated for 39 consecutive games. On 12 March 2012, Rutten was sacked as PSV manager following losses to Twente (2–6) and NAC (3–1) in the Eredivisie and to Valencia (4–2) in the Europa League.

The following season Rutten served as Vitesse head coach where John van den Brom had been head coach before moving to Belgian side Anderlecht. Rutten left Vitesse after the 2012–13 Eredivisie season, finishing in fourth place. On 3 March 2014, Feyenoord released a statement confirming they had hired Rutten as their new head coach for the 2014–15 Eredivisie season. On 2 March 2015, Feyenoord announced that Rutten had decided not to extend his one-year contract, meaning he would leave the club at the end of the season.

Feyenoord reached the knockout stage of the Europa League for the first time since 2004 with Rutten as head coach. On 17 May 2015, Feyenoord fired Rutten as head coach effective immediately after a 3–0 loss against PEC Zwolle, causing Feyenoord to finish 4th in the Eredivisie and missing out on directly qualifying for the Europa League.

Rutten then had brief spells in the Middle East at Al Shabab and Maccabi Haifa. On 6 January 2019, he became head coach of Anderlecht. However, on 16 April, he was already fired after only 13 matches.

On 20 May 2022, PSV confirmed that Rutten would return for the 2022–23 season as an assistant under head coach Ruud van Nistelrooy.

On 23 February 2026, Rutten was appointed by FFK as the head coach of the Curaçao national football team after Dick Advocaat had stepped down. Three months later, Rutten would resign, following disagreements between him and the national players. Additionally, the national team faced pressure from the national team's sponsor, calling for the return of Advocaat.

== Honours ==
=== Manager ===
Club

- KNVB Cup: 2001

Individual

- Rinus Michels Award: 2008

== Managerial statistics ==
As of 12 April 2019

Managerial record by team and tenure
Team	Record				
Team	G	W	D	L	Win %
Twente	75	39	22	14	52.00
Schalke 04	37	16	9	12	43.24
PSV	142	91	33	18	64.08
Vitesse	41	23	8	10	56.10
Feyenoord	45	22	10	13	48.89
Al Shabab	15	5	6	4	33.33
Maccabi Haifa	25	8	8	9	32.00
Anderlecht	13	5	2	6	38.46
Total	393	209	98	86	53.18
