= Strijp =

Borough of Eindhoven, Netherlands

Coordinates: 51°27′19″N 5°25′48″E

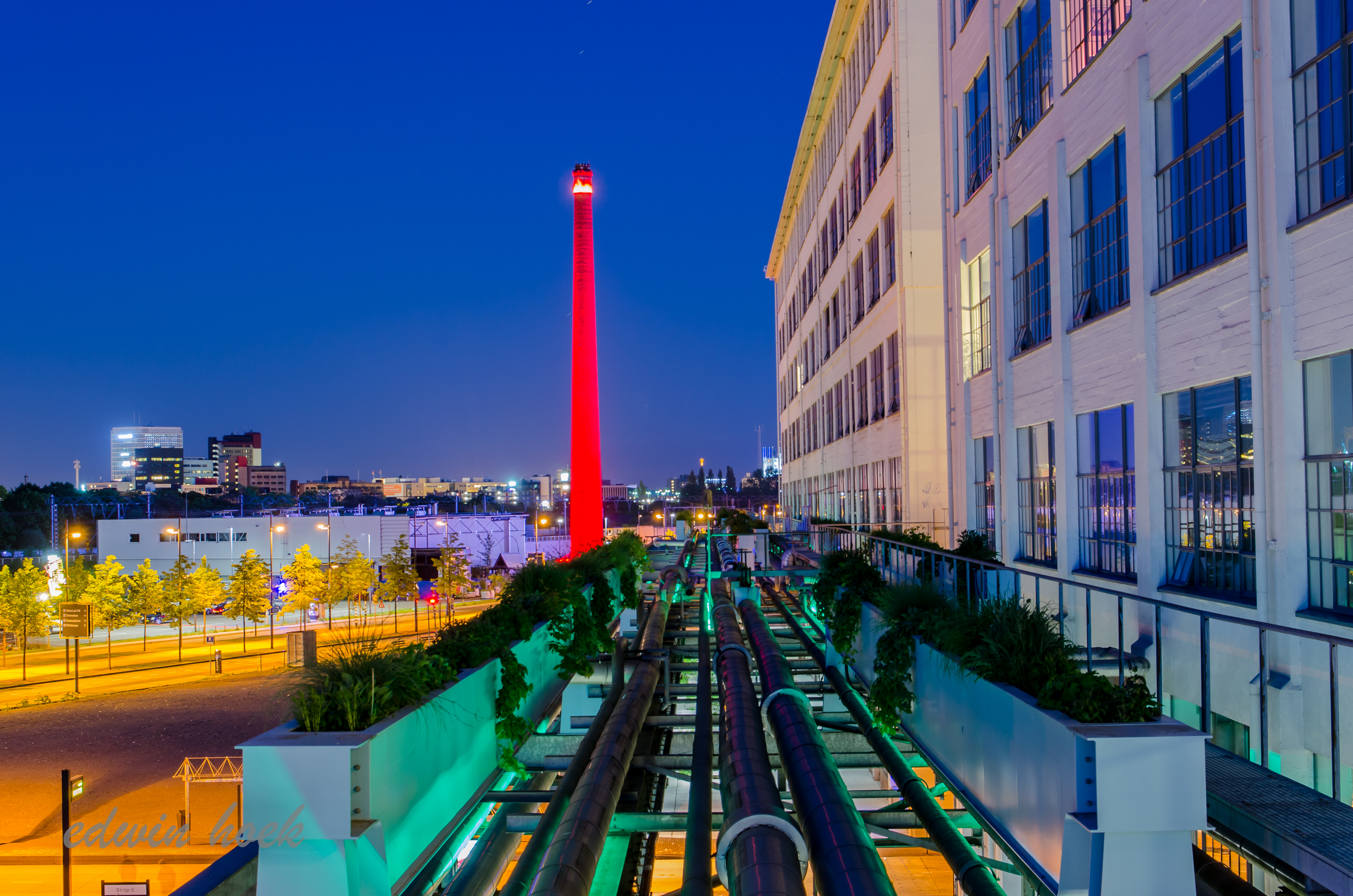
Strijp.S, art consisting of light works by Har Holland

Strijp is a former town in the Dutch province of North Brabant, now a borough of Eindhoven.

== History ==
Strijp was a separate municipality until 1920, when it became part of Eindhoven.

== Notable features ==
The Philips Stadion, home of football team PSV Eindhoven is based in Strijp. The stadium has a capacity of around 35,000.

Strijp-S, the repurposed buildings of the former Philips factory complex, is located within Strijp.
