= FC Utrecht in European football =

- Club: FC Utrecht
- Seasons played: 16
- First entry: 1980–81 UEFA Cup
- Latest entry: 2025–26 UEFA Europa League

FC Utrecht in European football refers to the participation of FC Utrecht, a football club from the Netherlands, in UEFA competitions. Since making their debut in 1980, FC Utrecht have appeared in several editions of the UEFA Cup and later the Europa League, with occasional entries in the Cup Winners’ Cup and Intertoto Cup. The club’s most notable achievements include reaching the UEFA Cup group stage in 2004–05 and again in the Europa League in 2010–11, where they faced major clubs such as SSC Napoli, Liverpool F.C., and FCSB. Although often eliminated in the early rounds, FC Utrecht have recorded memorable victories over opponents including Celtic F.C., Grazer AK, and MŠK Žilina.

== History ==
=== 1980s ===
FC Utrecht made its European debut in 1980. After defeating FC Argeș Pitești in their first tie, they were eliminated by Eintracht Frankfurt. Later in the decade they lost to Hamburger SV, FC Porto, and FC Dynamo Kyiv. Their best results came with victories over LASK before falling to Hellas Verona FC.

=== 1990s ===
European appearances were rare in the 1990s. Utrecht eliminated SK Sturm Graz in the first round but were knocked out by Real Madrid CF in the next stage. The rest of the decade saw no continental football for the club.

=== 2000s ===
The early 2000s brought renewed activity in Europe. FC Utrecht overcame Grazer AK but lost to parma, and were later beaten by Legia Warsaw. Their strongest run came in 2004, when they comfortably defeated MŠK Žilina and then entered the group stage. There they faced Real Zaragoza, FC Dnipro, Club Brugge KV, and FK Austria Wien, but did not progress further. An Intertoto Cup appearance in 2007 ended with elimination against Hammarby Fotboll on away goals.

=== 2010s ===
The highlight of the decade came in 2010, when FC Utrecht advanced past KF Tirana, FC Luzern, and Celtic F.C. to qualify for the Europa League group stage. There they played SSC Napoli, Liverpool F.C., and FCSB, earning respectable results but finishing bottom of the group. Later campaigns ended earlier, including a surprise defeat to FC Differdange 03 in 2013, a narrow elimination against Lech Poznań, a play-off defeat to FC Zenit Saint Petersburg, and an exit against HŠK Zrinjski Mostar.

=== 2020s ===
In the mid-2020s FC Utrecht returned to European competition. They overcame FC Sheriff Tiraspol and Servette FC to reach the play-off round.

== Overall record ==
As of 29 January 2026

| Competition | Pld | W | D | L | GF | GA | GD | W% |
|---|---|---|---|---|---|---|---|---|
| Cup Winners' Cup | 2 | 1 | 0 | 1 | 3 | 5 | −2 | 50.00 |
| UEFA Cup / UEFA Europa League | 68 | 21 | 19 | 28 | 88 | 91 | −3 | 30.88 |
| UEFA Intertoto Cup | 2 | 0 | 2 | 0 | 1 | 1 | +0 | 0.00 |
| Total | 72 | 22 | 21 | 29 | 92 | 97 | −5 | 30.56 |

Source: UEFA.com
Pld = Matches played; W = Matches won; D = Matches drawn; L = Matches lost; GF = Goals for; GA = Goals against; GD = Goal Difference; W% = Win percentage. Defunct competitions indicated in italics.

== Top scorers ==
As of 27 November 2025

| Rank | Goals | Player | Date of last goal | Competition |
|---|---|---|---|---|
| 1 | 9 | (Netherlands) Ricky van Wolfswinkel | 2 December 2010 | 2010–11 UEFA Europa League |
| 2 | 5 | (Netherlands) Stefaan Tanghe | 16 September 2004 | 2004–05 UEFA Cup |
| 2 | 5 | (Denmark) Victor Jensen | 21 August 2025 | 2025–26 UEFA Europa League |
| 4 | 4 | (Netherlands) Hans van de Haar | 16 September 2004 | 2004–05 UEFA Cup |
| 4 | 4 | (Zambia) Jacob Mulenga | 25 July 2013 | 2013–14 UEFA Europa League |
| 4 | 4 | (Netherlands) Willy Carbo | 30 September 1981 | 1981–82 UEFA Cup |
| 7 | 3 | (Netherlands) Dirk Kuyt | 3 October 2002 | 2002–03 UEFA Cup |
| 7 | 3 | (Belgium) Dries Mertens | 4 November 2010 | 2010–11 UEFA Europa League |
| 7 | 3 | (Spain) Miguel Rodríguez | 27 November 2025 | 2025–26 UEFA Europa League |
| 7 | 3 | (Netherlands) Ton de Kruijk | 2 October 1985 | 1985–86 European Cup Winners' Cup |
| 7 | 3 | (Poland) Włodzimierz Smolarek | 23 October 1991 | 1991–92 UEFA Cup |

== Opponents by country ==
As of 29 January 2026

| Rank | Country | Pld | W | D | L | GF | GA | Opponents |
|---|---|---|---|---|---|---|---|---|
| 1 | Austria | 7 | 4 | 2 | 1 | 13 | 6 | Austria Wien (1), Grazer AK (2), LASK (2), Sturm Graz (2) |
| 2 | Italy | 6 | 0 | 4 | 2 | 6 | 9 | Hellas Verona (2), Parma (2), Napoli (2) |
| 3 | Germany | 5 | 2 | 0 | 3 | 7 | 12 | Eintracht Frankfurt (2), Hamburger SV (2), SC Freiburg (1) |
| 4 | Bosnia and Herzegovina | 4 | 1 | 2 | 1 | 4 | 3 | Zrinjski Mostar (4) |
| 4 | Poland | 4 | 0 | 2 | 2 | 4 | 9 | Lech Poznań (2), Legia Warsaw (2) |
| 4 | Romania | 4 | 1 | 2 | 1 | 4 | 4 | Argeș Pitești (2), Steaua București (2) |
| 4 | Spain | 4 | 0 | 0 | 4 | 2 | 8 | Real Betis (1), Real Madrid (2), Zaragoza (1) |
| 4 | Sweden | 4 | 1 | 2 | 1 | 5 | 4 | Djurgården IF (2), Hammarby IF (2) |
| 4 | Switzerland | 4 | 4 | 0 | 0 | 9 | 3 | Luzern (2), Servette (2) |
| 10 | England | 3 | 0 | 2 | 1 | 1 | 2 | Liverpool (2), Nottingham Forest F.C. (1) |
| 10 | France | 3 | 0 | 1 | 2 | 0 | 5 | Auxerre (2), Lyon (1) |
| 10 | Portugal | 3 | 0 | 1 | 2 | 1 | 4 | Porto (3) |
| 10 | Scotland | 3 | 1 | 0 | 2 | 6 | 6 | Celtic (3) |
| 10 | Ukraine | 3 | 1 | 0 | 2 | 4 | 7 | Dnipro (1), Dynamo Kyiv (2) |
| 15 | Albania | 2 | 1 | 1 | 0 | 5 | 1 | Tirana (2) |
| 15 | Belgium | 2 | 0 | 0 | 2 | 0 | 3 | Club Brugge (1), KRC Genk (1) |
| 15 | Luxembourg | 2 | 0 | 1 | 1 | 4 | 5 | Differdange 03 (2) |
| 15 | Malta | 2 | 1 | 1 | 0 | 3 | 1 | Valletta (2) |
| 15 | Moldova | 2 | 2 | 0 | 0 | 7 | 2 | Sheriff Tiraspol (2) |
| 15 | Russia | 2 | 1 | 0 | 1 | 1 | 2 | Zenit Saint Petersburg (2) |
| 15 | Slovakia | 2 | 2 | 0 | 0 | 6 | 0 | Žilina (2) |
| 22 | Norway | 1 | 0 | 0 | 1 | 0 | 1 | SK Brann (1) |

== Most frequent opponents ==
As of 6 November 2025

| Rank | Club | Country | Pld | W | D | L | GF | GA | Last match |
|---|---|---|---|---|---|---|---|---|---|
| 1 | Zrinjski Mostar | Bosnia and Herzegovina | 4 | 1 | 2 | 1 | 4 | 3 | 2025–26 UEFA Europa League |
| 2 | Celtic | Scotland | 3 | 1 | 0 | 2 | 6 | 6 | 2025–26 UEFA Europa League |
| 2 | Porto | Portugal | 3 | 0 | 1 | 2 | 1 | 4 | 2025–26 UEFA Europa League |

== European match history ==
As of 29 January 2026

| Competition | Round | Opponent | Home | Away | Aggregate |
|---|---|---|---|---|---|
| 1980–81 UEFA Cup | First round | (Romania) Argeș Pitești | 2–0 | 0–0 | 2–0 |
| 1980–81 UEFA Cup | Second round | (Germany) Eintracht Frankfurt | 2–1 | 1–3 | 3–4 |
| 1981–82 UEFA Cup | First round | (Germany) Hamburger SV | 3–6 | 1–0 | 4–6 |
| 1982–83 UEFA Cup | First round | (Portugal) Porto | 0–1 | 0–2 | 0–3 |
| 1985–86 European Cup Winners' Cup | First round | (Ukraine) Dynamo Kyiv (Note: Team of former Soviet Union.) | 2–1 | 1–4 | 3–5 |
| 1987–88 UEFA Cup | First round | (Austria) LASK | 2–0 | 0–0 | 2–0 |
| 1987–88 UEFA Cup | Second round | (Italy) Hellas Verona | 1–1 | 1–2 | 2–3 |
| 1991–92 UEFA Cup | First round | (Austria) Sturm Graz | 3–1 | 1–0 | 4–1 |
| 1991–92 UEFA Cup | Second round | (Spain) Real Madrid | 1–3 | 0–1 | 1–4 |
| 2001–02 UEFA Cup | First round | (Austria) Grazer AK | 3–0 | 3–3 | 6–3 |
| 2001–02 UEFA Cup | Second round | (Italy) Parma | 1–3 | 0–0 | 1–3 |
| 2002–03 UEFA Cup | First round | (Poland) Legia Warsaw | 1–3 | 1–4 | 2–7 |
| 2003–04 UEFA Cup | First round | (Slovakia) Žilina | 2–0 | 4–0 | 6–0 |
| 2003–04 UEFA Cup | Second round | (France) Auxerre | 0–0 | 0–4 | 0–4 |
| 2004–05 UEFA Cup | First round | (Sweden) Djurgården IF | 4–0 | 0–3 | 4–3 |
| 2004–05 UEFA Cup | Group stage | (Spain) Zaragoza | —N/a | 0–2 | 5th |
| 2004–05 UEFA Cup | Group stage | (Ukraine) Dnipro Dnipropetrovsk | 1–2 | —N/a | 5th |
| 2004–05 UEFA Cup | Group stage | (Belgium) Club Brugge | —N/a | 0–1 | 5th |
| 2004–05 UEFA Cup | Group stage | Austria Wien | 1–2 | —N/a | 5th |
| 2007 Intertoto Cup | Third round | (Sweden) Hammarby IF | 1–1 | 0–0 | 1–1 (a) |
| 2010–11 Europa League | Second qualifying round | (Albania) Tirana | 4–0 | 1–1 | 5–1 |
| 2010–11 Europa League | Third qualifying round | (Switzerland) Luzern | 1–0 | 3–1 | 4–1 |
| 2010–11 Europa League | Play-off round | (Scotland) Celtic | 4–0 | 0–2 | 4–2 |
| 2010–11 Europa League | Group stage | (Italy) Napoli | 3–3 | 0–0 | 4th |
| 2010–11 Europa League | Group stage | (England) Liverpool | 0–0 | 0–0 | 4th |
| 2010–11 Europa League | Group stage | (Romania) Steaua București | 1–1 | 1–3 | 4th |
| 2013–14 Europa League | Second qualifying round | (Luxembourg) Differdange 03 | 3–3 | 1–2 | 4–5 |
| 2017–18 Europa League | Second qualifying round | (Malta) Valletta | 3–1 | 0–0 | 3–1 |
| 2017–18 Europa League | Third qualifying round | (Poland) Lech Poznań | 0–0 | 2–2 | 2–2 (a) |
| 2017–18 Europa League | Play-off round | (Russia) Zenit Saint Petersburg | 1–0 | 0–2 (a.e.t.) | 1–2 |
| 2019–20 Europa League | Second qualifying round | (Bosnia and Herzegovina) Zrinjski Mostar | 1–1 | 1–2 (a.e.t.) | 2–3 |
| 2025–26 Europa League | Second qualifying round | (Moldova) Sheriff Tiraspol | 4–1 | 3–1 | 7–2 |
| 2025–26 Europa League | Third qualifying round | (Switzerland) Servette | 2–1 | 3–1 | 5–2 |
| 2025–26 Europa League | Play-off round | (Bosnia and Herzegovina) Zrinjski Mostar | 0–0 | 2–0 | 2–0 |
| 2025–26 Europa League | League phase | (France) Lyon | 0–1 | —N/a | 34th |
| 2025–26 Europa League | League phase | (Norway) Brann | —N/a | 0–1 | 34th |
| 2025–26 Europa League | League phase | (Germany) SC Freiburg | —N/a | 0–2 | 34th |
| 2025–26 Europa League | League phase | (Portugal) Porto | 1–1 | —N/a | 34th |
| 2025–26 Europa League | League phase | (Spain) Real Betis | —N/a | 1–2 | 34th |
| 2025–26 Europa League | League phase | (England) Nottingham Forest | 1–2 | —N/a | 34th |
| 2025–26 Europa League | League phase | (Belgium) Genk | 0–2 | —N/a | 34th |
| 2025–26 Europa League | League phase | (Scotland) Celtic | —N/a | 2–4 | 34th |
UEFA club coefficient: 1,500 (126th) (as per 2022–23 season)

== Record by club ==
As of 29 January 2026

| Club | Country | Matches | Season(s) | W | D | L |
|---|---|---|---|---|---|---|
| Albania | | | | | | |
| Tirana | Albania | 2 | 2010–11 | 1 | 1 | 0 |
| Austria | | | | | | |
| LASK | Austria | 2 | 1987–88 | 1 | 1 | 0 |
| Sturm Graz | Austria | 2 | 1991–92 | 2 | 0 | 0 |
| Grazer AK | Austria | 2 | 2001–02 | 1 | 1 | 0 |
| Austria Wien | Austria | 1 | 2004–05 | 0 | 0 | 1 |
| Belgium | | | | | | |
| Club Brugge | Belgium | 1 | 2004–05 | 0 | 0 | 1 |
| Genk | Belgium | 1 | 2025–26 | 0 | 0 | 1 |
| Bosnia and Herzegovina | | | | | | |
| Zrinjski Mostar | Bosnia and Herzegovina | 4 | 2019–20, 2025–26 | 1 | 2 | 1 |
| England | | | | | | |
| Liverpool | England | 2 | 2010–11 | 0 | 2 | 0 |
| Nottingham Forest | England | 1 | 2025–26 | 0 | 0 | 1 |
| France | | | | | | |
| Auxerre | France | 2 | 2003–04 | 0 | 1 | 1 |
| Lyon | France | 1 | 2025–26 | 0 | 0 | 1 |
| Germany | | | | | | |
| Eintracht Frankfurt | Germany | 2 | 1980–81 | 1 | 0 | 1 |
| Hamburger SV | Germany | 2 | 1981–82 | 1 | 0 | 1 |
| SC Freiburg | Germany | 1 | 2025–26 | 0 | 0 | 1 |
| Italy | | | | | | |
| Hellas Verona | Italy | 2 | 1987–88 | 0 | 1 | 1 |
| Parma | Italy | 2 | 2001–02 | 0 | 1 | 1 |
| Napoli | Italy | 2 | 2010–11 | 0 | 2 | 0 |
| Luxembourg | | | | | | |
| Differdange 03 | Luxembourg | 2 | 2013–14 | 0 | 1 | 1 |
| Malta | | | | | | |
| Valletta | Malta | 2 | 2017–18 | 1 | 1 | 0 |
| Moldova | | | | | | |
| Sheriff Tiraspol | Moldova | 2 | 2025–26 | 2 | 0 | 0 |
| Norway | | | | | | |
| Brann | Norway | 1 | 2025–26 | 0 | 0 | 1 |
| Poland | | | | | | |
| Legia Warsaw | Poland | 2 | 2002–03 | 0 | 0 | 2 |
| Lech Poznań | Poland | 2 | 2017–18 | 0 | 2 | 0 |
| Portugal | | | | | | |
| Porto | Portugal | 3 | 1982–83, 2025–26 | 0 | 1 | 2 |
| Romania | | | | | | |
| Argeș Pitești | Romania | 2 | 1980–81 | 1 | 1 | 0 |
| Steaua București | Romania | 2 | 2010–11 | 0 | 1 | 1 |
| Russia | | | | | | |
| Zenit Saint Petersburg | Russia | 2 | 2017–18 | 1 | 0 | 1 |
| Scotland | | | | | | |
| Celtic | Scotland | 3 | 2010–11, 2025–26 | 1 | 0 | 2 |
| Slovakia | | | | | | |
| Žilina | Slovakia | 2 | 2003–04 | 2 | 0 | 0 |
| Spain | | | | | | |
| Real Betis | Spain | 1 | 2025–26 | 0 | 0 | 1 |
| Real Madrid | Spain | 2 | 1991–92 | 0 | 0 | 2 |
| Zaragoza | Spain | 1 | 2004–05 | 0 | 0 | 1 |
| Sweden | | | | | | |
| Djurgården IF | Sweden | 2 | 2004–05 | 1 | 0 | 1 |
| Hammarby IF | Sweden | 2 | 2007–08 | 0 | 2 | 0 |
| Switzerland | | | | | | |
| Luzern | Switzerland | 2 | 2010–11 | 2 | 0 | 0 |
| Servette | Switzerland | 2 | 2025–26 | 2 | 0 | 0 |
| Ukraine | | | | | | |
| Dynamo Kyiv | Ukraine | 2 | 1985–86 | 1 | 0 | 1 |
| Dnipro Dnipropetrovsk | Ukraine | 1 | 2004–05 | 0 | 0 | 1 |
