= Vonk (surname) =

Vonk is a Dutch metonymic occupational surname. Vonk means "spark" and refers to the work of a Smith. People with this surname include:

- Alice Vonk (1908–1997), American floriculturist
- Britt Vonk (born 1991), Dutch softball player
- Corry Vonk (1901–1988), Dutch revue and cabaret performer
- Erik Vonk (born 1953), Dutch banker and entrepreneur
- Freek Vonk (born 1983), Dutch biologist
- Hans Vonk (conductor) (1942–2004), Dutch conductor, champion of Dutch composers
- Hans Vonk (cyclist) (born 1959), Dutch racing cyclist
- Hans Vonk (footballer) (born 1970), South African football goalkeeper
- Henk Vonk (1942–2019), Dutch football trainer and scout
- Marcel Vonk (born 1974), Dutch poker player and physicist
- Matt Vonk (born 1990), Canadian football offensive lineman
- Michel Vonk (born 1968), Dutch football player and manager
- Rob Vonk (born 1950), Dutch modern pentathlete
- Roos Vonk (born 1960), Dutch psychologist
- Theo Vonk (1947–2025), Dutch footballer and manager

== See also ==
- Vonck
- Vonk (disambiguation)
