= Ton de Kruijk =

Dutch footballer

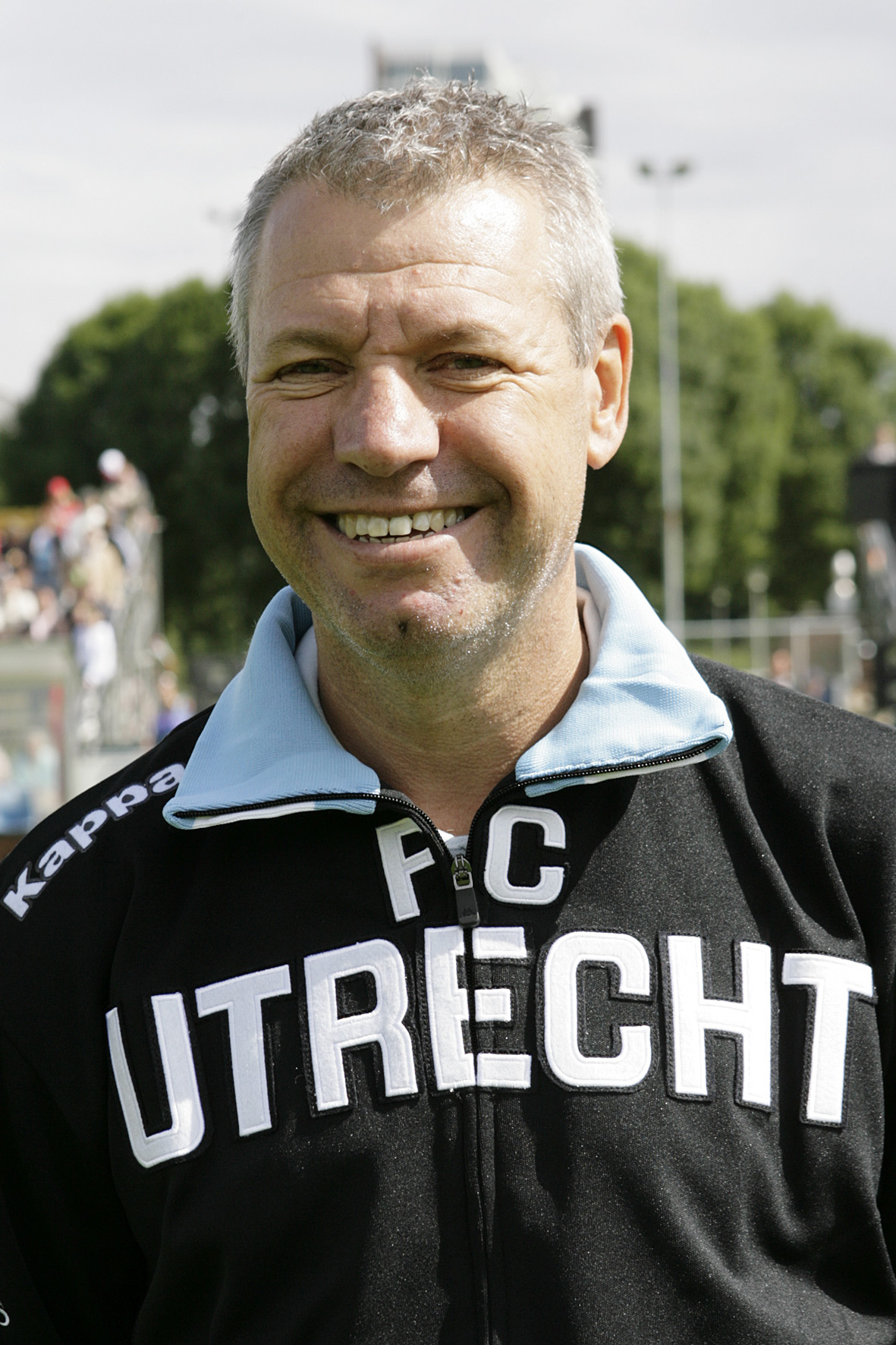
- De Kruijk in 2009

Personal information
- Full name: Antoon de Kruijk
- Date of birth: 27 November 1955 (age 70)
- Place of birth: Utrecht, Netherlands
- Height: 1.82 m (6 ft 0 in)
- Position: Midfielder

Youth career
- DWSV

Senior career*
Years	Team	Apps	(Gls)
1976–1988	FC Utrecht	289	(50)
- * Club domestic league appearances and goals

Antoon "Ton" de Kruijk (born 27 November 1955) is a Dutch former professional footballer who played as a midfielder.

== Career ==
De Kruijk played his entire career at FC Utrecht. In the 1980–81 season, he was joint club top scorer alongside Willy Carbo with 12 goals. He ended his career after the 1987–88 season. He played his final match on 8 May 1988 during the 3–0 away loss to Roda JC. De Kruijk was part of the first Central Players Council, part of the Association of Contract Players (VVCS), which at that time was led by then Sparta Rotterdam player Louis van Gaal. Born in Utrecht, De Kruijk experienced the club's successful period in the 1980s and played a total of 10 European matches. He scored three times in these; once in the 2–1 home win over Eintracht Frankfurt, once in 3–6 home loss to Hamburger SV and once in the 1–4 home loss to Dynamo Kyiv.

In 2006, De Kruijk voluntarily took charge of the 4th team of the Saturday amateurs of Delta Sports '95. With this team of young footballers who play in the Saturday Vierde Klasse, he won the title once and reached the semi-finals of the local cup twice. The team also reached the news in an article in Algemeen Dagblad about De Kruijk and his activities after his playing career.

In addition, from the 2009–10 season he began working as team coordinator of the first team of FC Utrecht. He became responsible for all organisational and administrative matters concerning the first team. He held this position until the end of the 2012–13 season.

== Private life ==
Already during his playing career, De Kruijk worked as a police officer. Today, he is a local police officer in the Utrecht neighborhood of Vleuten.

== Honours ==
Utrecht

- KNVB Cup: 1984–85
