= Vonk =

Vonk may refer to:

- Vonk (surname)
- Vonk (Belgium), Belgian trotskyist group
- Vonk (Netherlands), Dutch trotskyist group

== See also ==
- Vonck (surname)
- Vonka
