= Ton du Chatinier =

Dutch footballer and manager

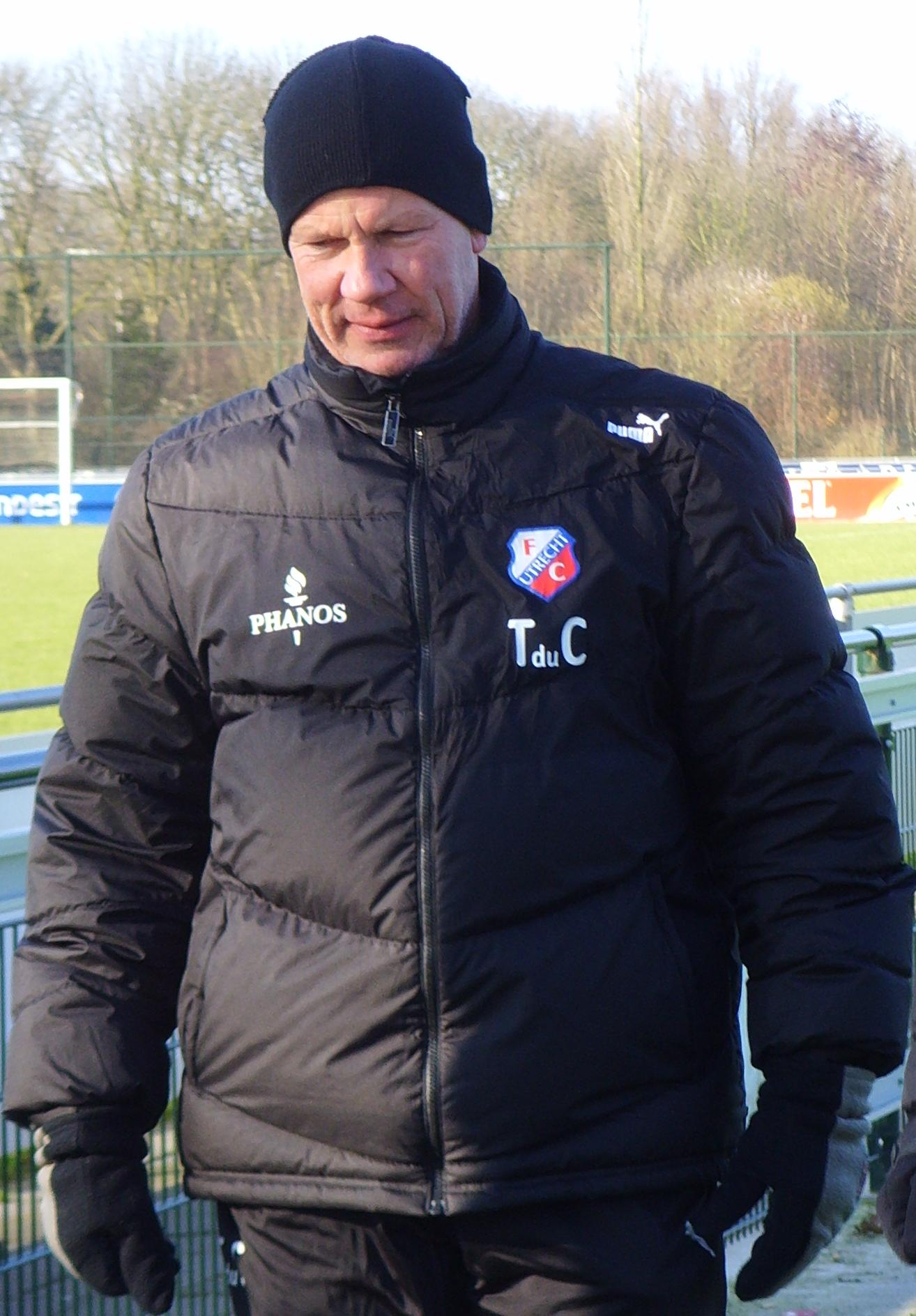

Personal information
- Date of birth: 13 January 1958 (age 68)
- Place of birth: Utrecht, Netherlands
- Position: Defender

Senior career*
Years	Team	Apps	(Gls)
1977–1987	FC Utrecht	235	(0)

Managerial career
- 1995: Utrecht (caretaker)
- 1995–1996: VV Montfoort
- 1997–1999: Argon
- 2000–2003: AFC
- 2003–2005: Elinkwijk
- 2005–2006: Kozakken Boys
- 2006–2008: AFC
- 2008: Spakenburg
- 2008–2011: Utrecht
- 2012–2013: Anzhi Makhachkala (Assistant)
- 2014: South Korea (Assistant)
- 2016–2017: AFC
- * Club domestic league appearances and goals

Ton du Chatinier (born 13 January 1958) is a retired Dutch football player. He later worked as an assistant manager to Hong Myung-bo of South Korea, and alongside Hong as an assistant to manager Guus Hiddink at Russian side FC Anzhi Makhachkala.

== Playing career ==
=== Club ===
Du Chatinier was born in Utrecht and during his professional career, he played as a defender for his hometown club FC Utrecht only. His career was cut short by a groin injury.

== Managerial career ==
Du Chatinier took over as a head coach at Utrecht from Willem van Hanegem at the end of 2008, and was sacked by the club at the end of the 2010–11 season after missing out on the playoffs for a ticket to play European football. He also managed Dutch amateur sides Spakenburg, Elinkwijk and Kozakken Boys.

In summer 2016, he was named manager of AFC for a third time.

== Personal life ==
In 2016, he was sentenced to 60 hours of community service for assault in a bar in Den Dolder. Du Chatinier moved to France to live in a castle in the south of the country. but put it up for sale in 2024. As of 2026, he still resides there.

== Honours ==
FC Utrecht

- KNVB Cup: 1984–85

== See also ==
- List of one-club men
