= Vonck =

Vonck is a Dutch surname. Vonk means "spark" and refers to the work of a Smith. The surname can refer to several people:

- Elias Vonck (1605–1652), Dutch Golden Age painter
- Jan Vonck (1631–1664), Dutch Golden Age painter
- Jan Frans Vonck (1743–1792), lawyer and one of the leaders of the Brabant Revolution
- Rico Vonck (born 1987), Dutch darts player

== See also ==
- Vonk (surname)
