= Frans Adelaar =

Dutch footballer and manager

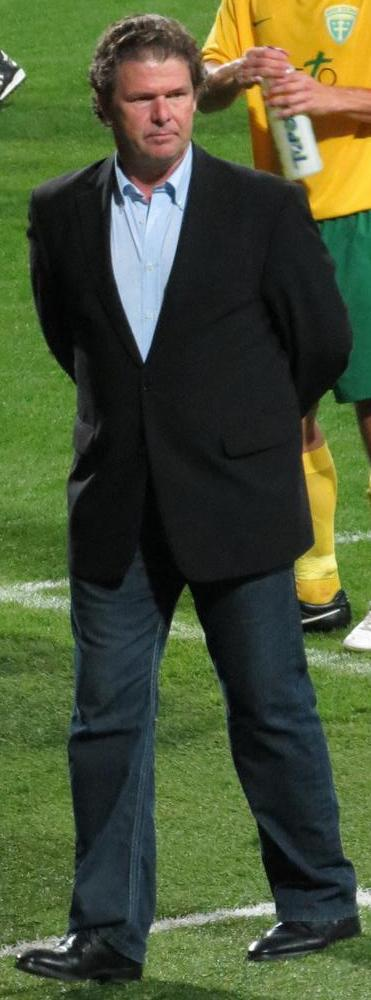

Personal information
- Date of birth: 5 December 1960 (age 65)
- Place of birth: Utrecht, Netherlands
- Position: Midfielder

Senior career*
Years	Team	Apps	(Gls)
1977–1990	Utrecht	178	(21)
1990–1992	DOVO		
1992–1993	Hollandia		

International career
1980–1983	Netherlands U21	7	(0)

Managerial career
- 1995–1997: GVVV
- 2000–2002: Utrecht
- 2002: Akratitos
- 2003–2004: De Graafschap
- 2004–2006: ADO Den Haag
- 2008–2009: Volendam
- 2009–2010: Sparta Rotterdam
- 2012–2013: MŠK Žilina
- 2014–2015: IJsselmeervogels
- * Club domestic league appearances and goals

Frans Adelaar (born 5 December 1960) is a Dutch football manager and former professional player.

He most recently was manager of Dutch top amateur side IJsselmeervogels.

== Career ==
=== Playing career ===
Adelaar played professional football for Utrecht and after that he played for the amateur clubs DOVO and Hollandia.

=== Managerial career ===
After retiring as a player in 1993, Adelaar has managed GVVV, Utrecht, Akratitos, De Graafschap, ADO Den Haag and Volendam. He was appointed by Sparta Rotterdam in May 2009 and dismissed in April 2010.

In April 2012, Adelaar took charge af Slovak side MŠK Žilina, with whom he won the domestic league and cup double in 2012 but was sacked in January 2013. In March 2014, he was appointed manager of Dutch amateur side IJsselmeervogels until the end of the 2013/14 season. Adelaar was dismissed by IJsselmeervogels in November 2015.

== Honours ==
=== Player ===
Utrecht

- KNVB Cup: 1984–85

=== Manager ===
MŠK Žilina

- Corgoň Liga (1): 2011-12
- Slovak Cup (1): 2012
