= Jean-Paul de Jong =

Dutch football manager (born 1970)

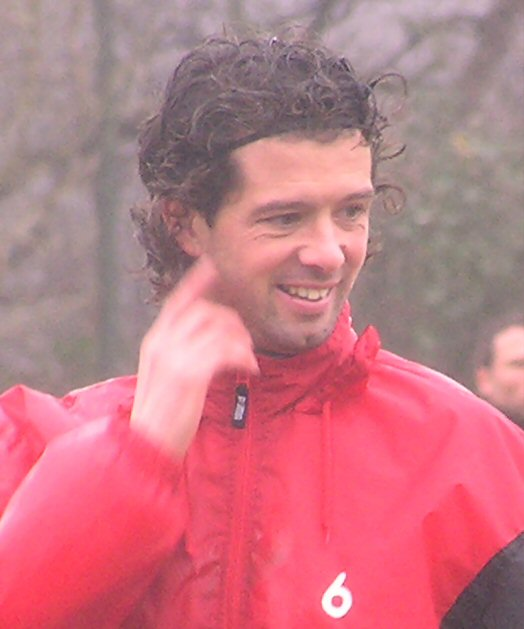
- De Jong in training with FC Utrecht

Personal information
- Full name: Jean-Paul de Jong
- Date of birth: 17 October 1970 (age 56)
- Place of birth: Utrecht, Netherlands
- Height: 1.75 m (5 ft 9 in)
- Position: Midfielder

Youth career
- DWSV
- Elinkwijk
- 1984–1986: Feyenoord
- 1986–1989: Ajax
- 1989–1991: Arminia Bielefeld

Senior career*
| Years | Team | Apps | (Gls) |
| 1991–1993 | VfL Osnabrück | 14 | (0) |
| 1993–2007 | Utrecht | 370 | (11) |
| Total | | 384 | (11) |

Managerial career
- 2007–2013: Utrecht (youth)
- 2013–2015: FC Eindhoven
- 2015–2017: Utrecht (assistant)
- 2017–2018: Utrecht
- 2019–2020: Roda JC Kerkrade
- 2021–2022: Ajax (U18)
- * Club domestic league appearances and goals

Jean-Paul de Jong (born 17 October 1970) is a Dutch professional football manager and former player who most recently coached Ajax' under-18s.

He is best known for his lengthy spell as a player with FC Utrecht, appearing in nearly 450 official games in 14 years and winning two major titles.

== Career ==
Born in Utrecht, de Jong had several trainee spells, including with country giants Feyenoord and AFC Ajax. He made his professional debuts in Germany at the age of 20 with 2. Bundesliga club VfL Osnabrück, appearing sparingly over the course of two seasons.

In 1993 de Jong returned to his country and city, going on serve a 14-year spell with FC Utrecht. In total he played 370 Eredivisie matches, in which he scored 11 goals; as the side appeared in three consecutive domestic cup finals, winning twice, "Mr. FC Utrecht" (as he was nicknamed) was on target in the final of the 2002–03 edition, opening the scoresheet in a 4–1 win against Feyenoord.

On 22 April 2007, de Jong received his 83rd yellow card in the league, surpassing the record number of cards received by a player which had been previously held by Barry van Galen. During his final season as a player, in which he contributed with 21 matches to a comfortable ninth place, he completed his coaching training badges and began to work as a youth trainer with the club.

== Honours ==
- KNVB Cup: 2002–03, 2003–04
- Johan Cruyff Shield: 2004
