= 1984–85 Eerste Divisie =

29th season of the second-tier football league in Netherlands

Eerste Divisie
- Season: 1984–85
- Champions: SC Heracles
- Promoted: SC Heracles; VVV-Venlo; NEC
- Goals: 884
- Average goals/game: 2.88

The Dutch Eerste Divisie in the 1984–85 season was contested by 18 teams, one more than in the previous season. This was due to RKC Waalwijk entering from the amateurs. SC Heracles won the championship.

== New entrants ==
Entered from amateur football

- RKC Waalwijk

Relegated from the 1983–84 Eredivisie

- DS '79
- Helmond Sport
- Willem II

== League standings ==
Pos	Team	Pld	W	D	L	GF	GA	GD	Pts	Promotion
1	SC Heracles	34	18	10	6	50	35	+15	46	Promoted to Eredivisie.
2	VVV-Venlo	34	20	5	9	75	39	+36	45	Promoted to Eredivisie.
3	De Graafschap	34	16	13	5	60	35	+25	45	Qualified for Promotion play-off as Period champions.
4	FC Den Haag	34	16	13	5	62	40	+22	45	Qualified for Promotion play-off as Period champions.
5	RKC Waalwijk	34	16	12	6	63	40	+23	44	Qualified for Promotion play-off as Period champions.
6	sc Heerenveen	34	15	9	10	47	40	+7	39	
7	NEC	34	15	8	11	54	39	+15	38	Qualified for Promotion play-off as Period champions.
8	Willem II	34	9	19	6	41	33	+8	37	
9	SC Cambuur	34	11	11	12	44	40	+4	33	
10	SC Veendam	34	11	10	13	48	58	−10	32	
11	RBC Roosendaal	34	11	8	15	41	57	−16	30	
12	SVV	34	9	11	14	50	57	−7	29	
13	Helmond Sport	34	13	3	18	52	62	−10	29	
14	DS '79	34	9	10	15	40	55	−15	28	
15	Telstar	34	6	15	13	36	42	−6	27	
16	FC Wageningen	34	9	8	17	47	61	−14	26	
17	Vitesse Arnhem	34	10	4	20	42	66	−24	24	
18	FC Eindhoven	34	4	7	23	32	85	−53	15	

Source: rsssf.com

== Promotion competition ==
In the promotion competition, four period winners (the best teams during each of the four quarters of the regular competition) played for promotion to the Eredivisie.

Pos	Team	Pld	W	D	L	GF	GA	GD	Pts	Promotion
1	NEC	6	3	3	0	10	4	+6	9	Promoted to Eredivisie.
2	De Graafschap	6	3	2	1	8	2	+6	8	
3	FC Den Haag	6	2	0	4	8	11	−3	4	
4	RKC Waalwijk	6	1	1	4	6	15	−9	3	

Source: rsssf.com

== Attendances ==
#	Club	Average
1	Heerenveen	6,747
2	VVV	6,024
3	Cambuur	4,800
4	Den Haag	4,247
5	Heracles	3,941
6	RKC	3,644
7	De Graafschap	3,624
8	Willem II	3,400
9	RBC	3,079
10	Veendam	2,794
11	Helmond	2,556
12	NEC	2,447
13	Wageningen	2,371
14	Vitesse	2,356
15	Eindhoven	1,674
16	SVV	1,550
17	Telstar	1,259
18	DS '79	1,144

== See also ==
- 1984–85 Eredivisie
- 1984–85 KNVB Cup
