= 1984–85 Eredivisie =

29th season of the Eredivisie

Eredivisie
- Season: 1984–85
- Champions: AFC Ajax (22nd title)
- Promoted: FC Twente; MVV Maastricht; NAC
- Relegated: FC Volendam; NAC; PEC Zwolle
- European Cup: AFC Ajax
- Cup Winners' Cup: FC Utrecht
- UEFA Cup: PSV Eindhoven; Feyenoord; Sparta Rotterdam
- Goals: 983
- Average goals/game: 3.21
- Top goalscorer: (Netherlands) Marco van Basten Ajax 22 goals

The Dutch Eredivisie in the 1984–85 season was contested by 18 teams. Ajax won the championship.

== League standings ==
Pos	Team	Pld	W	D	L	GF	GA	GD	Pts	Qualification or relegation
1	Ajax	34	24	6	4	93	46	+47	54	Qualified for 1985–86 European Cup
2	PSV	34	17	14	3	84	33	+51	48	Qualified for 1985–86 UEFA Cup
3	Feyenoord	34	21	6	7	87	51	+36	48	Qualified for 1985–86 UEFA Cup
4	Sparta	34	17	8	9	62	52	+10	42	Qualified for 1985–86 UEFA Cup
5	FC Groningen	34	15	11	8	57	43	+14	41	
6	FC Den Bosch	34	10	16	8	45	32	+13	36	
7	Fortuna Sittard	34	14	6	14	49	48	+1	34	
8	FC Twente	34	12	10	12	60	64	−4	34	
9	Haarlem	34	12	9	13	51	57	−6	33	
10	FC Utrecht	34	13	6	15	47	42	+5	32	Qualified for 1985–86 Cup Winners' Cup
11	Roda JC	34	11	10	13	51	59	−8	32	
12	Excelsior	34	9	12	13	47	51	−4	30	
13	AZ '67	34	8	14	12	59	70	−11	30	
14	MVV	34	10	9	15	39	55	−16	29	
15	Go Ahead Eagles	34	11	6	17	46	59	−13	28	
16	FC Volendam	34	9	7	18	37	67	−30	25	Relegated to Eerste Divisie
17	NAC	34	7	5	22	35	68	−33	19	Relegated to Eerste Divisie
18	PEC Zwolle	34	4	9	21	34	86	−52	17	Relegated to Eerste Divisie

Source: rsssf.com

== Results ==
Home \ Away	AJA	AZ	DBO	EXC	FEY	FSI	GAE	GRO	HFC	MVV	NAC	PEC	PSV	RJC	SPA	TWE	UTR	VOL
Ajax		4–2	2–2	3–0	4–2	1–0	7–2	1–3	4–3	5–1	6–1	2–1	1–4	7–0	4–0	4–4	1–0	5–2
AZ '67	1–2		1–1	1–1	2–5	2–1	3–3	1–1	1–1	2–0	1–0	3–1	2–2	1–1	0–2	1–2	1–0	3–0
FC Den Bosch '67	1–1	2–2		0–0	1–2	2–4	3–0	0–0	0–0	0–2	4–1	2–0	2–1	0–0	3–0	3–0	2–2	0–0
Excelsior	0–1	3–2	1–1		2–4	1–1	1–1	3–1	0–1	1–0	1–0	5–0	2–0	4–0	1–1	1–2	1–0	1–2
Feyenoord	1–3	1–1	3–1	2–1		4–0	1–0	2–2	4–1	3–1	1–0	6–0	2–2	2–1	5–0	5–3	2–0	0–0
Fortuna Sittard	0–2	0–4	0–2	1–1	3–2		1–0	2–2	1–1	1–2	7–2	1–0	2–1	0–0	3–0	2–0	1–0	0–3
Go Ahead Eagles	0–2	5–1	0–3	3–2	2–0	0–1		2–2	0–4	3–2	4–0	4–0	0–4	3–1	1–2	2–1	3–1	0–0
FC Groningen	2–2	2–6	1–1	2–0	1–1	2–0	2–0		3–1	1–1	2–1	1–0	0–1	2–2	0–1	4–2	3–0	1–3
FC Haarlem	1–0	1–1	2–1	5–5	2–3	2–1	3–1	1–0		1–1	1–3	4–2	1–2	1–2	0–0	1–2	1–1	1–0
MVV	1–3	1–1	0–3	2–2	0–4	1–0	0–0	0–3	0–2		0–1	2–1	1–1	0–1	3–1	3–0	2–1	5–1
NAC	1–2	0–0	0–0	0–0	1–3	0–2	0–1	1–2	1–2	1–1		7–3	0–0	2–0	0–1	2–1	2–0	1–0
PEC Zwolle '82	1–1	3–3	1–0	2–2	1–5	0–2	1–0	1–4	2–1	0–0	4–2		1–1	3–4	1–1	1–1	0–2	0–0
PSV	4–0	7–2	0–0	2–0	5–1	1–1	3–1	1–1	7–1	6–2	4–1	4–1		1–0	0–0	2–2	1–1	5–0
Roda JC	2–3	4–2	1–1	1–1	2–1	2–3	0–0	1–2	0–0	2–2	4–2	2–0	1–3		5–3	5–1	3–0	1–0
Sparta Rotterdam	2–5	5–2	2–1	4–0	3–1	3–2	2–1	2–0	4–1	1–0	5–1	2–2	2–2	0–0		2–2	1–0	3–0
FC Twente	1–1	2–2	0–0	1–0	2–2	3–2	4–1	1–2	3–1	3–1	2–0	6–0	0–0	3–2	1–6		0–2	3–0
FC Utrecht	0–1	2–0	3–2	4–1	2–3	2–1	2–0	2–0	0–2	0–1	2–0	4–0	2–2	4–0	1–0	3–1		1–1
FC Volendam	1–3	5–2	0–1	1–3	2–4	0–3	0–3	0–3	2–1	0–1	2–1	2–1	0–5	2–1	4–1	1–1	3–3	

Legend: Blue = home team win; Yellow = draw; Red = away team win.

== Attendances ==
No.	Club	Average	Change	Highest
1	Feyenoord	17,139	-33,3%	57,000
2	PSV	15,559	-3,1%	26,000
3	AFC Ajax	13,324	7,7%	41,000
4	FC Groningen	12,540	0,4%	21,500
5	FC Twente	8,953	10,1%	18,000
6	FC Utrecht	7,432	-14,0%	18,000
7	Fortuna Sittard	7,271	-9,3%	11,000
8	NAC	6,242	32,9%	12,600
9	Roda JC	5,765	-15,9%	11,000
10	FC Den Bosch	5,684	-21,0%	19,000
11	FC Volendam	5,594	-1,5%	17,000
12	Go Ahead Eagles	4,676	-32,1%	11,000
13	MVV Maastricht	4,635	15,7%	12,000
14	Sparta	4,576	-15,4%	13,000
15	HFC Haarlem	4,253	-1,8%	10,000
16	AZ '67	3,847	-8,1%	9,800
17	PEC Zwolle	3,815	-46,8%	12,000
18	Excelsior	2,982	-35,3%	9,500

== See also ==
- 1984–85 Eerste Divisie
- 1984–85 KNVB Cup
