= Stefaan Tanghe =

Belgian footballer

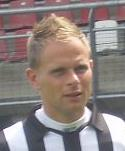
- Tanghe with Heracles Almelo in 2007

Personal information
- Date of birth: 15 January 1972 (age 54)
- Place of birth: Kortrijk, Belgium
- Height: 1.75 m (5 ft 9 in)
- Position: Attacking midfielder

Senior career*
Years	Team	Apps	(Gls)
1992–1997	K.V. Kortrijk	112	(17)
1997–2000	Mouscron	80	(27)
2000–2005	Utrecht	161	(40)
2006–2007	Heracles Almelo	44	(7)
2007–2010	Roeselare	69	(5)
2010–2012	KBS Poperinge		

International career
1999–2002	Belgium	9	(2)
- * Club domestic league appearances and goals

Stefaan Tanghe (born 15 January 1972) is a Belgian former professional footballer who played as an attacking midfielder.

== Career ==
Tanghe made his debut in professional football in the 1997–98 season when playing for Excelsior Moeskroen. He also played competitive matches for FC Utrecht.

== International career ==
He earned 9 caps for the Belgium national football team.

== Honours ==
FC Utrecht

- KNVB Cup: 2002–03, 2003–04
- Johan Cruyff Shield: 2004
