= Han Berger =

Dutch footballer and coach

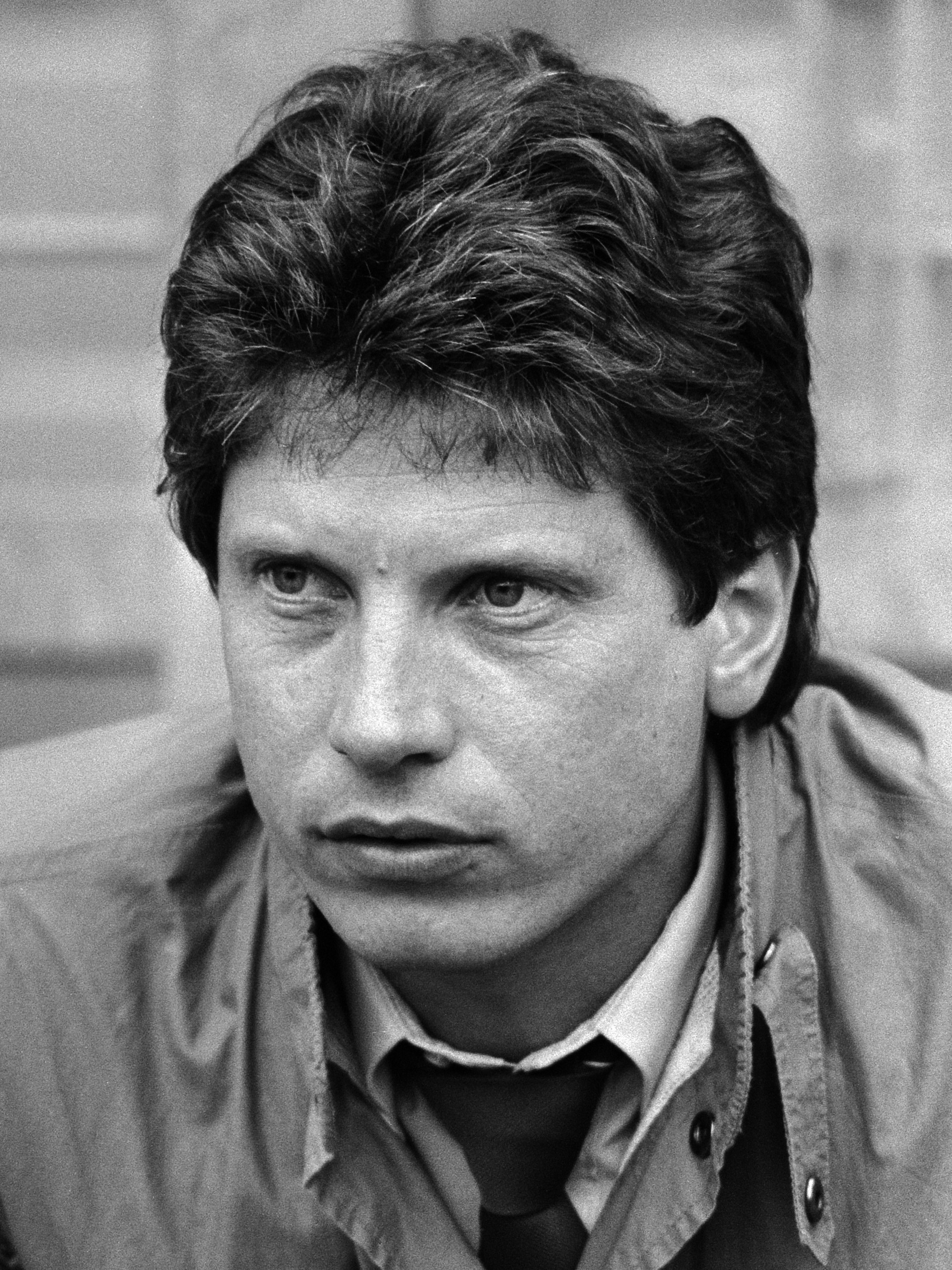

Personal information
- Full name: Johan Antonius Berger
- Date of birth: 17 June 1950 (age 76)
- Place of birth: Utrecht, Netherlands
- Position: Defender

Senior career*
| Years | Team | Apps | (Gls) |
| 1968–1970 | Velox | | |

Managerial career
- 1976–1983: Utrecht
- 1983–1986: Groningen
- 1986: AZ '67
- 1987: Fortuna Sittard
- 1987–1989: Utrecht
- 1989–1991: Fortuna Sittard
- 1992–1993: SVV/Dordrecht'90
- 1993–1995: Sparta
- 1995–1998: Cambuur
- 1998–2000: Netherlands U21
- 2000–2003: Utrecht (technical director)
- 2004: Oita Trinita
- 2005–2008: De Graafschap (technical director)
- 2009–2014: Australia (technical director)
- 2010: Australia (caretaker)
- 2014–2016: Sydney FC (director)
- 2016–2017: Sydney FC (technical director)
- * Club domestic league appearances and goals

Johan Antonius "Han" Berger (born 17 June 1950) is a Dutch association football coach and former player.

== Managerial career ==
=== FC Utrecht ===
Berger is the youngest head coach ever in the history of professional football in the Netherlands. After suffering a severe knee injury, his playing career ended at the age of 22 and he was appointed youth and assistant coach at his hometown side FC Utrecht. When the then head coach Jan Rab was dismissed in January 1976, Berger was chosen above Pim van de Meent to be appointed head coach of FC Utrecht at the age of 25.

After that he coached 637 games in the Dutch Eredivisie, being particularly successful with FC Utrecht and FC Groningen, leading them to a number of UEFA Cup campaigns. Under his management Cambuur Leeuwarden in 1998 won the 1st division play-offs for promotion to the Eredivisie. He left the club that summer.

From 1998 till August 2000 Berger was in charge of the national youth teams program of the Royal Dutch Football Association (KNVB) and head coach of the Netherlands Under 21 and Olympic Team and in 2004 he coached Oita Trinita in the Japanese J-League.

=== Australia ===
As director of football at FC Utrecht and De Graafschap he acquired a reputation for implementing successful technical strategies, particularly in the field of youth development. Because of this he was offered the role of technical director of the Football Federation Australia. He held this position from January 2009 till July 2014. In 2010 Berger also had a short spell as caretaker manager of the Socceroos.

On 17 April 2014 Berger was appointed as a member of Directors on the board of Sydney FC.

On 24 June 2016 it was announced that Berger was appointed as technical director at Sydney FC.

== Personal life ==
Berger's son Ruud is a retired professional footballer, who played for FC Utrecht when Han was the club's technical director.

== Managerial statistics ==
| Team | From | To | Record | | | | |
| Team | From | To | G | W | D | L | Win % |
|---|---|---|---|---|---|---|---|
| Oita Trinita | 2004 | 2004 | 30 | 8 | 6 | 16 | 26.67 |
| Total | | | 30 | 8 | 6 | 16 | 26.67 |
