= Henk Vonk =

Dutch footballer (1942–2019)

Personal information
- Date of birth: 7 April 1942
- Place of birth: Utrecht, Netherlands
- Date of death: 17 June 2019 (aged 77)
- Place of death: Vianen, Netherlands
- Position: Midfielder

Senior career*
Years	Team	Apps	(Gls)
- DOS
- Gooiland

Managerial career
- 1993: FC Utrecht (caretaker)
- 1995: FC Utrecht (caretaker)
- * Club domestic league appearances and goals

Henk Vonk (7 April 1942 – 17 June 2019) was a Dutch footballer who played as a midfielder for DOS and Gooiland, and later spent 30 years at FC Utrecht as a scout and coach, as well as two spells as caretaker manager.
