= 2002–03 KNVB Cup =

Tournament details
- Country: Netherlands
- Teams: 86

Final positions
- Champions: FC Utrecht
- Runners-up: Feyenoord

Tournament statistics
- Top goal scorer: Robin van Persie (7)

The 2002–03 KNVB Cup was the 85th edition of the Dutch national football annual knockout tournament for the KNVB Cup. 86 teams contested, beginning on 6 August 2002 and ending at the final on 1 June 2003.

FC Utrecht won the cup for the second time by beating Feyenoord 4–1.

== Teams ==
- All 18 participants of the Eredivisie 2002-03: six teams entering in the round of 16 of the knock-out round; one in the first round of the knock-out round and the rest in the group stage
- All 18 participants of the Eerste Divisie 2002-03
- 48 teams from lower (amateur) leagues
- Two youth teams

== Group stage ==
The matches of the group stage were played between August 6 and September 4, 2002.

Group 1
| Team | Pts |
|---|---|
| 1. Young Ajax | 7 |
| 2. AZ _{E} | 7 |
| 3. HVV Hollandia _{A} | 1 |
| 4. VV Ter Leede _{A} | 1 |

Group 2
| Team | Pts |
|---|---|
| 1. FC Volendam _{1} | 5 |
| 2. SV Huizen _{A} | 5 |
| 3. FC Hilversum _{A} | 4 |
| 4. AFC _{A} | 1 |

Group 3
| Team | Pts |
|---|---|
| 1. Stormvogels Telstar _{1} | 9 |
| 2. SV Argon _{A} | 4 |
| 3. Rijnsburgse Boys _{A} | 2 |
| 4. VV Noordwijk _{A} | 1 |

Group 4
| Team | Pts |
|---|---|
| 1. ADO Den Haag _{1} | 6 |
| 2. SVV Scheveningen _{A} | 3 |
| 3. SV Deltasport _{A} | 0 |

Group 5
| Team | Pts |
|---|---|
| 1. Sparta Rotterdam _{1} | 9 |
| 2. HFC Haarlem _{1} | 6 |
| 3. Zwart-Wit '28 _{A} | 3 |
| 4. VSV TONEGIDO _{A} | 0 |

Group 6
| Team | Pts |
|---|---|
| 1. Excelsior _{E} | 7 |
| 2. Excelsior Maassluis _{A} | 5 |
| 3. SV Capelle _{A} | 4 |
| 4. FC Kranenburg _{A} | 0 |

Group 7
| Team | Pts |
|---|---|
| 1. TOP Oss _{1} | 7 |
| 2. FC Dordrecht _{1} | 6 |
| 3. RKSV UDI '19/Beter Bed _{A} | 4 |
| 4. BVV Barendrecht _{A} | 0 |

Group 8
| Team | Pts |
|---|---|
| 1. RBC Roosendaal _{E} | 9 |
| 2. HSV Hoek _{A} | 6 |
| 3. VV Baronie _{A} | 3 |
| 4. VV Kloetinge _{A} | 0 |

Group 9
| Team | Pts |
|---|---|
| 1. RKC Waalwijk _{E} | 9 |
| 2. FC Eindhoven _{1} | 4 |
| 3. SV TOP _{A} | 3 |
| 4. ASWH _{A} | 1 |

Group 10
| Team | Pts |
|---|---|
| 1. Helmond Sport _{1} | 7 |
| 2. UNA _{A} | 6 |
| 3. FC Den Bosch _{1} | 4 |
| 4. Geldrop/AEK _{A} | 0 |

Group 11
| Team | Pts |
|---|---|
| 1. VVV-Venlo _{1} | 5 |
| 2. Schijndel/Bol Acc. _{A} | 4 |
| 3. VV Gemert _{A} | 4 |
| 4. Fortuna Sittard _{1} | 3 |

Group 12
| Team | Pts |
|---|---|
| 1. Roda JC _{E} | 9 |
| 2. MVV _{1} | 4 |
| 3. SV Meerssen _{A} | 3 |
| 4. EVV _{A} | 1 |

Group 13
| Team | Pts |
|---|---|
| 1. NEC _{E} | 6 |
| 2. JVC Cuijk _{A} | 3 |
| 3. GVVV _{A} | 0 |

Group 14
| Team | Pts |
|---|---|
| 1. De Graafschap _{E} | 7 |
| 2. De Treffers KERGO _{A} | 5 |
| 3. VV de Bataven _{A} | 3 |
| 4. VV Bennekom _{A} | 1 |

Group 15
| Team | Pts |
|---|---|
| 1. FC Twente _{E} | 7 |
| 2. RKSV Babberich _{A} | 5 |
| 3. HSC '21 _{A} | 4 |
| 4. SDC Putten _{A} | 0 |

Group 16
| Team | Pts |
|---|---|
| 1. Heracles Almelo _{1} | 9 |
| 2. AGOVV Apeldoorn _{A} | 6 |
| 3. STEVO _{A} | 1 |
| 4. VV Be Quick '28 _{A} | 1 |

Group 17
| Team | Pts |
|---|---|
| 1. Young Vitesse | 9 |
| 2. FC Zwolle _{E} | 6 |
| 3. USV Elinkwijk _{A} | 3 |
| 4. SV Spakenburg _{A} | 0 |

Group 18
| Team | Pts |
|---|---|
| 1. Go Ahead Eagles _{1} | 9 |
| 2. FC Emmen _{1} | 6 |
| 3. VV Hoogeveen _{A} | 3 |
| 4. VVOG _{A} | 0 |

Group 19
| Team | Pts |
|---|---|
| 1. Cambuur Leeuw. _{1} | 6 |
| 2. SC Joure _{A} | 6 |
| 3. SV Urk _{A} | 6 |
| 4. SC Genemuiden _{A} | 0 |

Group 20
| Team | Pts |
|---|---|
| 1. FC Groningen _{E} | 7 |
| 2. BV Veendam _{1} | 7 |
| 3. ACV _{A} | 3 |
| 4. VV Appingedam _{A} | 0 |

_{E} Eredivisie; _{1} Eerste Divisie; _{A} Amateur teams

== Knock-out phase ==
=== First round ===
The matches of the first round were played on November 5 and 6, 2002. Eredivisie clubs NAC Breda and Willem II entered the tournament this round. During the group stage, they were still active in the Intertoto Cup.

| Home team | Result | Away team |
|---|---|---|
| FC Zwolle | 1–0 (aet) | Helmond Sport |
| Excelsior | 1–0 (aet) | FC Dordrecht |
| De Graafschap | 2–0 | SV Argon |
| SC Joure | 2–1 | Young Vitesse |
| NAC Breda _{E} | 3–1 | Cambuur Leeuwarden |
| HFC Haarlem | 2–0 | Heracles Almelo |
| UNA | 0–2 | RKC Waalwijk |
| FC Emmen | 0–1 | FC Groningen |
| Willem II _{E} | 2–1 | FC Twente |
| ADO Den Haag | 2–1 (aet) | De Treffers (on October 20) |

| Home team | Result | Away team |
|---|---|---|
| RKSV Babberich | 1–2 | Stormvogels Telstar (on October 9) |
| VVV-Venlo | 1–0 | FC Eindhoven (on October 11) |
| Excelsior Maassluis | 2–3 | RBC Roosendaal |
| Young Ajax | 3–2 (aet) | SV Huizen |
| HSV Hoek | 1–2 | NEC |
| AGOVV Apeldoorn | 1–0 (aet) | FC Volendam |
| BV Veendam | 0–5 | Roda JC |
| MVV | 3–3 (p: 5-4) | TOP Oss |
| Schijndel/Bol Accountants | 2–3 | Sparta Rotterdam |
| Go Ahead Eagles | 2–3 | AZ |

_{E} two Eredivisie entrants

=== Second round ===
The matches of the second round were played on December 3 and 4, 2002.

| Home team | Result | Away team |
|---|---|---|
| Excelsior | 4–2 | Sparta Rotterdam |
| HFC Haarlem | 3–2 | MVV |
| VVV-Venlo | 1–2 | AGOVV Apeldoorn |
| Stormvogels Telstar | 1–0 | AZ |
| SC Joure | 2–3 | FC Groningen |
| Young AFC Ajax | 2–1 | Willem II |
| ADO Den Haag | 2–1 (aet) | RKC Waalwijk |
| FC Zwolle | 1–4 | De Graafschap |
| Roda JC | 1–0 | NEC |
| RBC Roosendaal | 1–3 | NAC Breda (on December 11) |

=== Round of 16 ===
The matches were played on February 4 and 5, 2003. The six Eredivisie clubs that had been active in European competitions after qualification last season entered the tournament this round.

| Home team | Result | Away team |
|---|---|---|
| Vitesse Arnhem _{E} | 4–2 | NAC Breda (on January 29) |
| Stormvogels Telstar | 1–3 | sc Heerenveen _{E} |
| De Graafschap | 2–3 | FC Utrecht _{E} |
| ADO Den Haag | 0–3 | PSV _{E} |
| Excelsior | 4–2 | Young AFC Ajax |
| FC Groningen | 3–0 | HFC Haarlem |
| Feyenoord _{E} | 6–1 | AGOVV Apeldoorn |
| Ajax _{E} | 1–0 | Roda JC |

_{E} six Eredivisie entrants

=== Quarter-finals ===
The matches of the quarter finals were played on 4-5 March 2003.

| Home team | Result | Away team |
|---|---|---|
| Excelsior | 1–3 | FC Utrecht |
| PSV | 2–1 | sc Heerenveen |
| Ajax | 4–1 | FC Groningen |
| Feyenoord | 3–1 | Vitesse Arnhem |

=== Semi-finals ===
The matches of the semi-finals were played on 15-16 April 2003.

| Home team | Result | Away team |
|---|---|---|
| FC Utrecht | 2–1 | PSV |
| Feyenoord | 1–0 | Ajax |

=== Final ===
1 June 2003
18:00 CEST

| Utrecht | 4–1 | Feyenoord |
|---|---|---|
| De Jong 39'; Gluščević 49', 57'; Kuyt 81' | | Kalou 73'; Bosvelt (red card) 76' |

De Kuip, Rotterdam
Attendance: 45,000
Referee: Ruud Bosse

FC Utrecht would play in the UEFA Cup.
