= Jan Vonck =

Dutch Golden Age painter

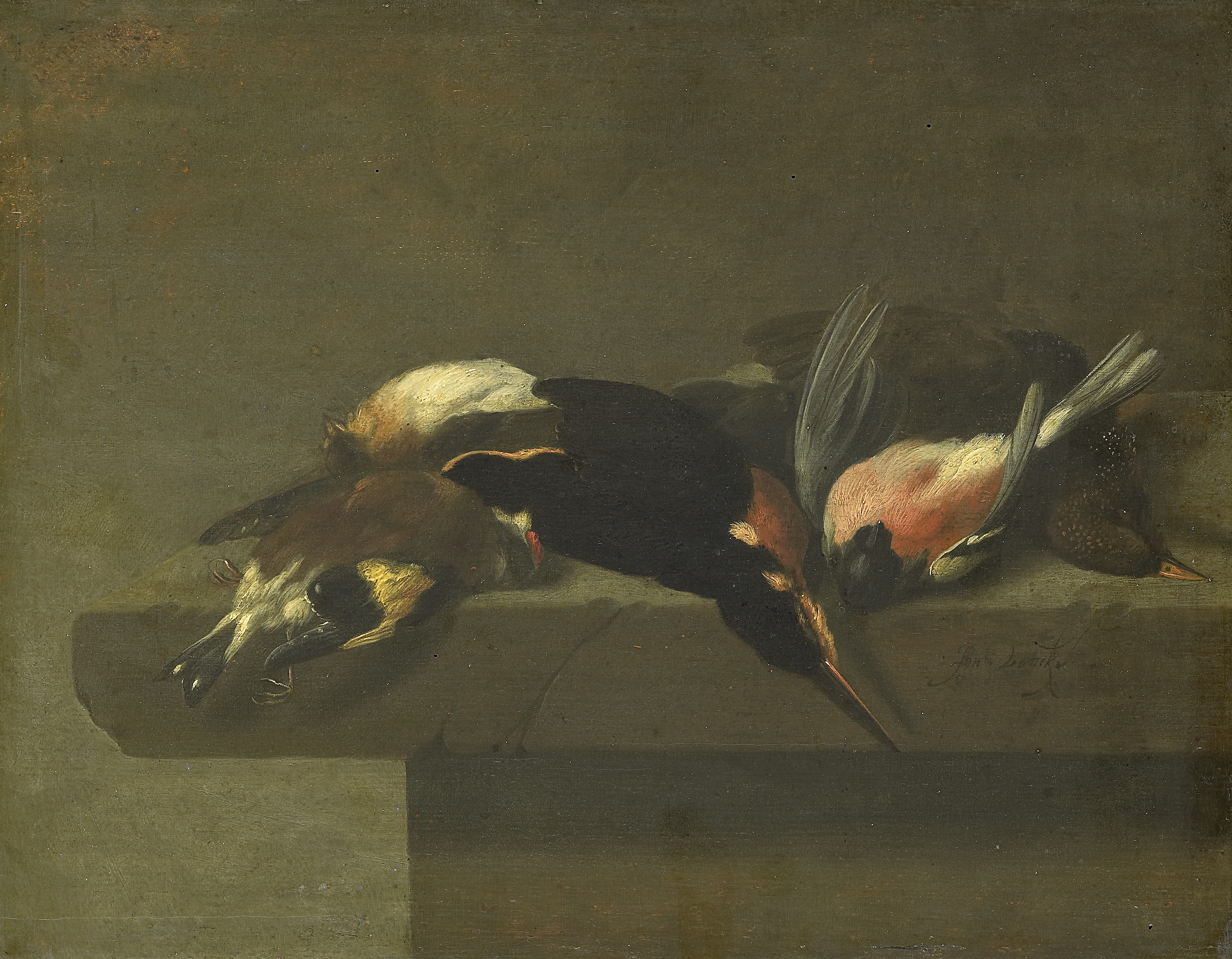
Dead Birds (c. 1650s)

Jan Vonck (1631 – 1663/1664) was a Dutch Golden Age painter.

== Biography ==
Vonck was born in 1631 in Toruń. According to the RKD he was the son and pupil of his father Elias Vonck, and both were known for paintings of living birds in landscapes and hunting still lifes with dead poultry after the manner of Joannes Fijt, Jan Baptist Weenix, Alexander Adriaenssen, and Melchior Hondecoeter. He was born in Poland while his father was living there and was working with him in his workshop in Amsterdam by the 1640s. After the death of his father he continued the workshop and also made a few fish still lifes after Abraham van Beijeren. He is also known for painting living birds in one of Jacob van Ruisdael's landscapes. He died in Amsterdam in 1663 or 1664.
