= Elias Vonck =

Dutch Golden Age painter

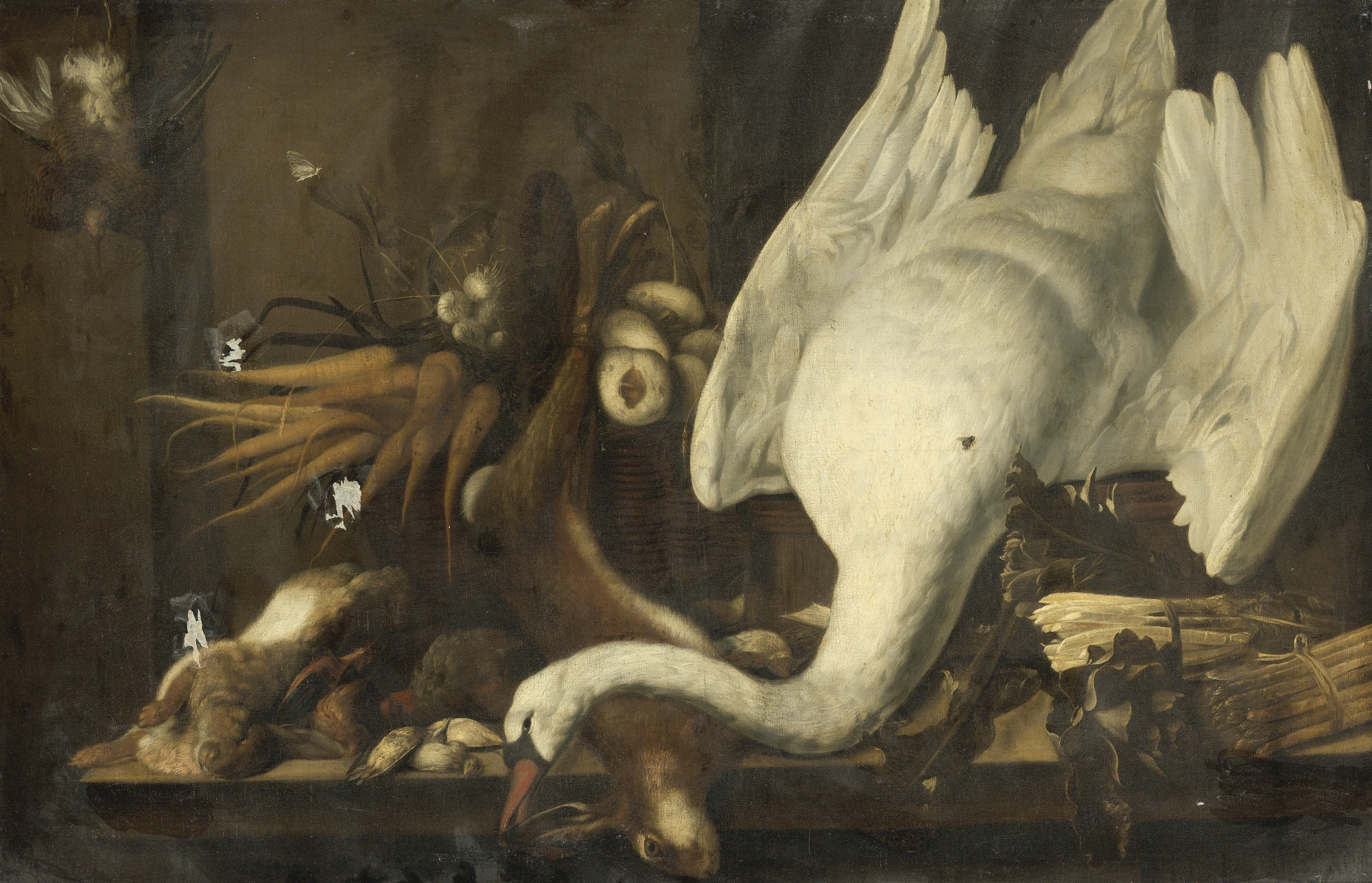
Elias Vonck, Still life with a swan, asparagus, game and vegetables, 1630s

Elias Vonck (1605, Amsterdam – 1652, Amsterdam), was a Dutch Golden Age painter.

== Biography ==
According to the RKD he worked in Poland 1631-1639, where son Jan was born. He is known for portraits, still lifes, hunting and farm scenes with animals.
