= FC Utrecht =

Dutch association football club

- Full name: Football Club Utrecht
- Nicknames: Utreg; Cupfighters; De Domstedelingen (The Cathedral Citizens)
- Founded: 1 July 1970; 56 years ago
- Stadium: Stadion Galgenwaard
- Capacity: 23,750
- Owner(s): Frans van Seumeren Holding B.V. (58%); Stichting Continuïteit FC Utrecht (1%) other shareholders (41%)
- Chairman: Steef Klop
- Head coach: Anthony Correia
- League: Eredivisie
- 2025–26: Eredivisie, 6th of 18
- Website: www.fcutrecht.nl
Home colours	Away colours	Third colours

Football Club Utrecht (Dutch pronunciation: [ɛfˈseː ˈytrɛxt]) is a Dutch professional football club based in Utrecht. The club competes in the Eredivisie, the top tier of Dutch football, and plays its home matches at the Stadion Galgenwaard.

The club was formed in 1970 as a merger between local clubs VV DOS, USV Elinkwijk and Velox. Since then, the club has won three national cup tournaments: in 1985, 2003 and 2004, also winning the Johan Cruyff Shield in 2004 as the first club outside the traditional Dutch Big Three. Utrecht is also the only club outside the Big Three which has never suffered relegation from the top-flight Eredivisie.

Utrecht have competed in 15 European campaigns, reaching the group stages of the 2004–05 UEFA Cup and the 2010–11 UEFA Europa League, their best European results.

== History ==
=== 1970–1979: Merger and early years ===
In the late 1960s, the municipality of Utrecht initiated talks of a merger between the professional departments of VV DOS, Velox and USV Elinkwijk with the aim of continuing to guarantee professional football at top level in the city. DOS was the largest of the three clubs, and had won a national championship in 1958. With stout defensive tactics, the club had narrowly escaped relegation for three successive years, and mismanagement had left the club on the brink of bankruptcy. A cynical comment from that time was: "The club can do nothing, not even relegate."

Merger plans were experienced less positively at Velox and Elinkwijk. Velox had been promoted to the Eerste Divisie in the early 1960s and had been close to achieving promotion to the Eredivisie a few times. In 1968, however, the team relegated to the third-tier Tweede Divisie again. Elinkwijk had been more successful than Velox. A yo-yo club, Elinkwijk alternated seasons in the bottom of the Eredivisie with seasons in the top of the Eerste Divisie. In addition, there was a sentiment in Elinkwijk that it was not originally an Utrecht-based club, but that it belonged more to the town of Zuilen which was an independent municipality until 1954. The club had no preference for the impending merger, but eventually gave in to pressure from the municipality. During the merger talks, Elinkwijk tried to secure a spot in the highest league of amateur football, but was instead placed in the Tweede Klasse. The following season, the club won the championship and as a result promoted to the Eerste Klasse.

On 1 July 1970, the merger became a fact and FC Utrecht was founded. Since VV DOS had managed to avoid relegation from the Eredivisie in the season before, the new club could immediately play at the highest level in its inaugural season. Utrechts's home ground became Stadion Galgenwaard, which had previously been the VV DOS home ground, the largest stadium of the three parent clubs. Bert Jacobs, the then 29-year-old head coach of Velox, became the first manager of Utrecht; he was joined by 24-year-old Fritz Korbach from USV Elinkwijk as assistant. Their assignment was to forge one club with one culture from its three cores and three different identities.

In the first season, the Utrecht first-team squad consisted almost entirely of former players from DOS, Velox and USV Elinkwijk. Only one outside player was recruited, as defender Co Adriaanse was signed for ƒ 125,000 from De Volewijckers from Amsterdam. The core of the squad also consisted of former DOS players Cor Hildebrand, Ed van Stijn, Piet van Oudenallen, Tom Nieuwenhuys and John Steen Olsen, former Elinkwijk players Joop Leliveld, Jan Blaauw, Dick Teunissen and Jan Groenendijk and former Velox player Marco Cabo. Their first official match was against defending European Cup winners Feyenoord. Groenendijk scored Utrecht's first goal, but despite the 0–1 lead, the team eventually lost 4–1. The club finished in 9th place in its inaugural season, a solid midtable finish.

=== 1980–1990: Near bankruptcy and revival ===
In the first ten years of its existence, Utrecht grew steadily. Important players from that period were Hans van Breukelen, Leo van Veen and Willem van Hanegem. In the early 1980s, it was decided to construct a new stadium, which was called Nieuw Galgenwaard.

The tide turned in 1981 when the Dutch Fiscal Information and Investigation Service (FIOD) opened an investigation into the club. They could reveal a series of financial malpractices, including transfer and salary costs of various players being financed illegally. Between 1976 and 1980, the club had not paid national insurance contributions and taxes on signing bonuses. In addition, there had been committed fraud with receipts. The club could not meet the stated additional tax and was placed under a debt moratorium. Bankruptcy, at that point, seemed inevitable. Various campaigns were organised by players and supporters, and through a petition, the club managed to collect 66,000 signatures for the retention of the club. Under the leadership of goalkeeper Hans van Breukelen, first-team players went canvassing with FC Utrecht merchandise and recorded a single entitled "We geven het niet op" ("We don't give up"). The municipality of Utrecht eventually decided to respond to the massive local support and covered expenses.

The early 1980s, under the leadership of head coach and former player Han Berger, were successful. The team finished in fifth place in 1980, third in 1981 and fifth place in 1982 of the Eredivisie and in 1982 the club also reached the KNVB Cup final, which was lost to AZ '67. The team also played European football for the first time in club history. The success was in large part due to the large number of youth players that broke through to the first team during these years. Out of eighteen first-team players reaching the cup final in 1982, fourteen were academy players, including van Breukelen, Gert Kruys, Willy Carbo and Ton de Kruijk. Many of these players, such as Leo van Veen, Frans Adelaar, Willem van Hanegem, Ton du Chatinier and Jan Wouters, would later return to the club as managers.

Although the club went through a golden era results-wise, the club was far from healthy financially. To keep the club afloat, key players were let go every season. Van Breukelen left for Nottingham Forest in 1982, Carbo for Club Brugge in 1983 and Rob de Wit for Ajax in 1983. As a result, Utrecht dropped from a near-top side to more mid-table finishes in the Eredivisie table in the mid-1980s.

On 1 April 1985, Utrechts Nieuwsblad published an article about an imminent takeover of the club. A consortium of, among others, the English newspaper magnate Robert Maxwell, Philips, KLM and Johan Cruyff, were said to have plans to invest heavily in Utrecht and acquire a majority shareholding. The supporters of the club were strongly against the takeover, however, especially due to the interference of Ajax legend, Cruyff. Ultimately, the takeover failed.

=== 1991–2005: Troubled 1990s, success and tragedy ===
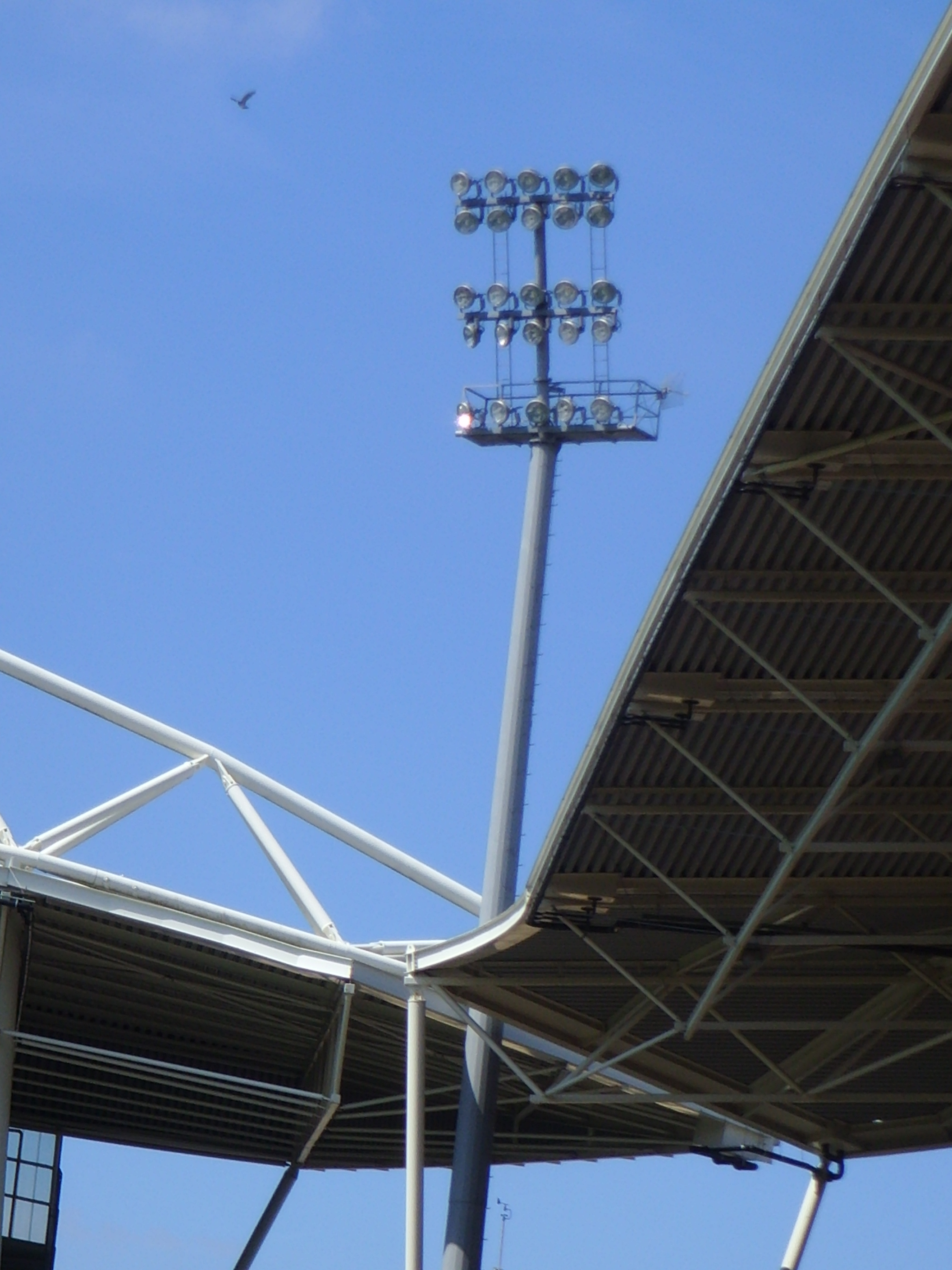
Detail from new stadium in 2007

After a number of weaker years, Utrecht reached fourth place in the Eredivisie in 1990–91, led by manager Ab Fafié and with players such as Johan de Kock, Jan Willem van Ede and Rob Alflen and top goalscorer of the season, Włodzimierz Smolarek. After this, however, things went downhill for the club. Because Utrecht missed out on European qualification, incomes were lost. Between 1989 and 1996, six managers led the team and there were just as many changes in the board of directors. Quarrels and financial issues arose, which again meant that key players had to be sold to close the holes in the budget. Alflen left for Ajax in 1991, de Kock left for Roda JC in 1994 and Ferdi Vierklau moved to Vitesse in 1996.

Main sponsor AMEV intervened in the dire financial situation in 1996. The club received a financial injection in exchange for a substantial shareholder position. The insurance company appointed Hans Herremans as club chairman. Many investments were made immediately in 1996, as Errol Refos, Rob Witschge and former Utrecht player John van Loen came over from Feyenoord, Reinier Robbemond from Dordrecht, Dick van Burik from NAC and Michael Mols from Twente. Ronald Spelbos was appointed manager with Jan Wouters as assistant. In 1998, a complete renovation of the Stadion Galgenwaard was initiated, designed by ZJA Zwarts & Jansma Architecten.

Despite the capital injection, successes on the pitch failed to materialise during the first years, and a number of managers were hired and fired in rapid succession. In 1993, the team reached a relatively successful eighth place, but for the next eight years, until 2001, the club was unable climb to a higher position than tenth place in the table. In 1994 and 1996, the club even finished 15th, just above the relegation spots. In 1996, the team won only six matches, including an important 1–2 win at Twente, which meant that the promotion/relegation play-offs were avoided. Only in 2001, Utrecht managed to achieve European qualification again with a fifth-place finish, led by former player Frans Adelaar, who had become manager. Utrecht finished with the same number of points as RKC Waalwijk, Roda JC and Vitesse, but secured fifth place on goal difference. In 2002, the team lost the final of the KNVB Cup to Ajax, but in 2003 and 2004, the team, which had come under the leadership of Foeke Booy, managed to win the cup. Important players in this period included Dirk Kuyt, Tom Van Mol, Jean-Paul de Jong, Pascal Bosschaart and Stijn Vreven. In 2004, the Johan Cruyff Shield was also won at the expense of Ajax (2–4), as Hans Somers claimed a key role with two crucial goals.

As a result of, among other things, a new financial crisis and a lack of lucrative transfers, Utrecht was again on the brink of collapse in the spring of 2003. There was no more money to pay Midreth, the company responsible for constructing the renovation of the stadium. At that time, the stadium was largely finished. Since the material for the construction had already been delivered, the construction company advanced the costs, about € 5.5 million. However, this once again left the club with a substantial debt. Bankruptcy was averted with a remediation and the sale of all properties, including the stadium, to, among others, the municipality of Utrecht and Midreth. In the following years, FC Utrecht returned to the mid-table of the Eredivisie.

On 29 November 2005, French defender and fan favourite, David Di Tommaso died suddenly at the age of 26. Di Tommaso had suffered a cardiac arrest in his sleep. The club subsequently retired Di Tommaso's kit number, 4. At the end of each season, the David Di Tommaso Trophy is awarded to the player who was considered of the most valuable that season by fans; the winner is determined by an internet poll. Before his death, Di Tommaso had been the most recent winner of the FC Utrecht Player of the Year, and the award was named after him since then.

=== 2005–2008: Phanos takeover ===
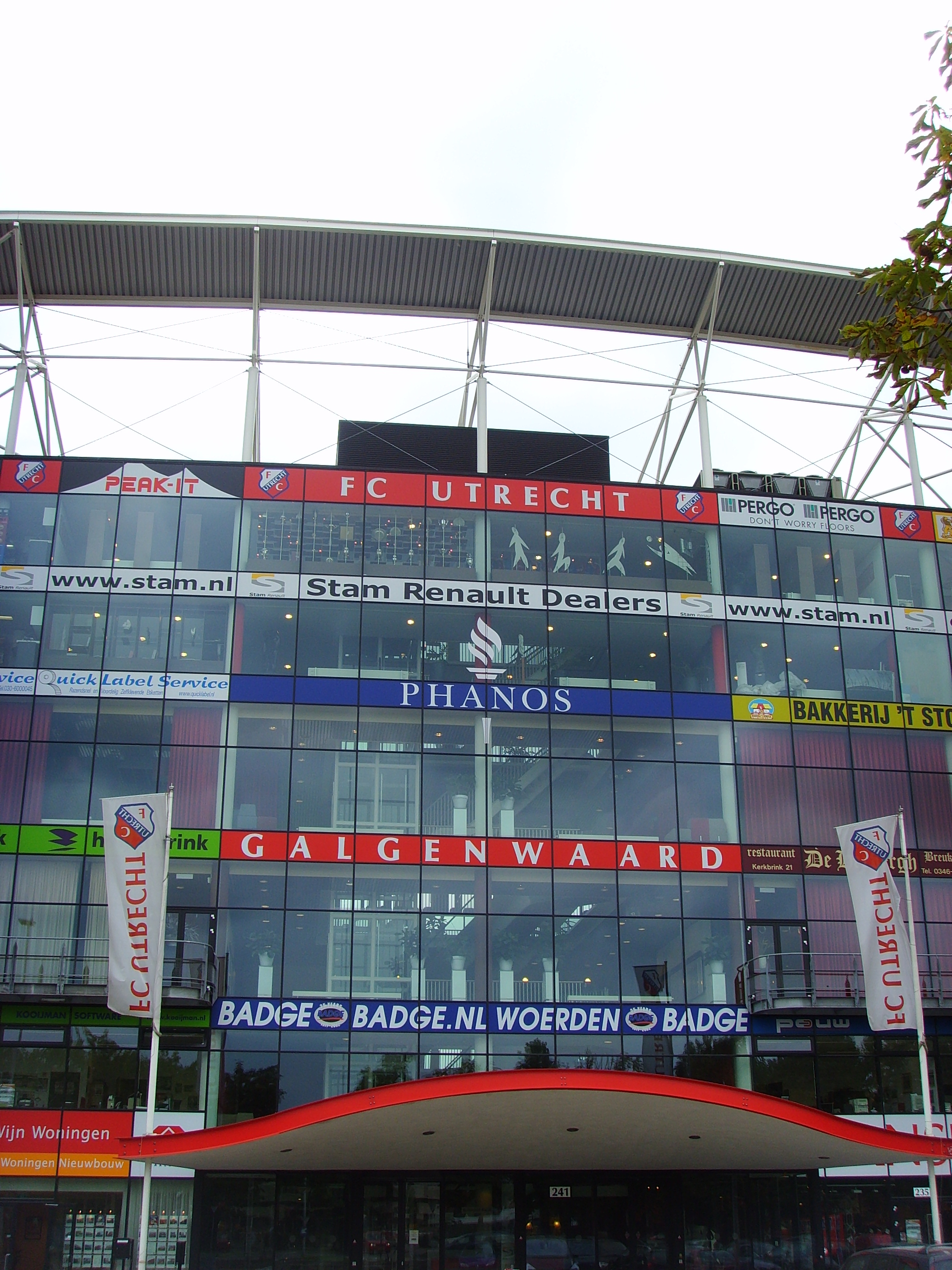
Exterior of Stadion Galgenwaard in 2007, with the Phanos logo visible

After the averted bankruptcy of 2003, Utrecht, despite participating in the UEFA Cup in 2003 and 2004, was no longer able to get out of debt. In July 2007, real estate company Phanos first showed interest in taking over the club. For the symbolic amount of €1, Phanos wanted to take over the club, including all outstanding debts. The company then intended to demolish the existing stadium to make the site available for housing. The company would then build a new stadium near the new Leidsche Rijn district. Phanos also wanted the club to become a serious contender in the Eredivisie by means of financial injections. The plan was met with a lot of resistance from supporters, as the Stadion Galgenwaard had seen a radical renovation recently.

Subsequently, a conflict broke out between chairman Jan Willem van Dop, who had come over as director of Feyenoord in 2005, and the supervisory board. The board accused Van Dop of financial mismanagement, poor communication and egotistical behavior, including the recruitment of manager Willem van Hanegem and striker Kevin Vandenbergh. On 3 September 2007, van Dop was relieved from his duties as chairman, but was put back in office three days later after summary proceedings. As a result, the entire supervisory board decided to step down.

=== 2008–present: Van Seumeren era ===
On 2 April 2008, the Utrecht board announced in a press conference that the club had found a suitable takeover candidate in entrepreneur Frans van Seumeren, former director of the Mammoet logistics company. Van Seumeren acquired 63% of the shares of Utrecht bv for €16 million. He promised to commit to the club for a period of at least ten years and to reinvest any proceeds in the club. He set the goal that the club had to reconnect with the subtop of the league table within a few years, comparable to a club like Heerenveen. Van Seumeren took place in the new supervisory board, of which Jacques van Ek became chairman. Despite the fact that previous takeover candidate Phanos had failed to comply with the agreement between Utrecht and van Seumeren, they remained affiliated with the club as main shirt sponsor until March 2011.

In his role as new owner of the club, van Seumeren was actively involved in the club's footballing policy. In the summer of 2008, against the wishes of head coach van Hanegem, he meddled with the composition of the technical staff by replacing assistant coaches John van Loen and David Nascimento, strength and conditioning coach Rob Druppers and goalkeeping coach Maarten Arts. At the end of 2008, he fired van Hanegem, after he had repeatedly expressed negative opinion on van Seumeren. Technical director Piet Buter also left afterwards. They were replaced by the duo Ton du Chatinier and Foeke Booy as head coach and technical advisor, respectively.

In 2011, chairman van Dop left Utrecht. In the same year, Wilco van Schaik was appointed as new director of the club. The change of function endorsed the conversion of Utrecht from a football association to a vennootschap (private limited company). Du Chatinier was sacked in the summer of 2011 and replaced by assistant Jan Wouters. Despite having a successful resume in terms of player sales and signings, Booy was also let go in 2012 after disappointing results on the pitch. In the 2012–13 season, Utrecht would go on to have one its best seasons historical seasons, finishing fifth in the league table, winning the play-offs for European football and equaling the club points record from 1981 (63 points). The following season, however, turned out to be a setback; Utrecht was eliminated in the second qualifying round of the UEFA Europa League by Differdange 03 from Luxembourg. Utrecht eventually finished tenth in the league.

When Wouters decided not to renew his contract in 2014, after having been head coach for three years, a new direction was taken in terms of technical policy. Co Adriaanse was appointed as technical advisor, a position that has been vacant since Booy's departure in 2012. Adriaanse obtained an advisory, but not binding, voice in player policy, and was given powers in composing the club's coaching staff. Rob Alflen, assistant under Wouters, would provide the training sessions. The pair were hired with the purpose of making Utrecht play more attacking, attractive football.

Alflen disappointed, only leading Utrecht to eleventh place in the league table, and he was let go after only one season in charge in 2015. Erik ten Hag was appointed as his replacement, coming from a position as Bayern Munich II manager. Club icon Jean-Paul de Jong was appointed as his assistant. Adriaanse also left the club, with Ten Hag taking the extra role as technical manager. The 2015–16 season proved to be highly successful, with Utrecht ending in fifth place of the Eredivisie table and reaching the KNVB Cup final, which was lost 2–1 to Feyenoord. Utrecht would also lose the final of the play-offs for European football to Heracles Almelo. The reserves team of the club, Jong Utrecht, however, became champions of the Beloften Eredivisie in the 2015–16 season. With changes made to the Dutch football league system, Jong Utrecht was therefore promoted to the second-tier Eerste Divisie.

In the 2016–17 season, Utrecht secured a fourth-place finish with two match-days left to play. In the final of the play-offs for European football, they beat AZ Alkmaar was after an exciting diptych (0–3, 3–0, 4–3 after penalty shoot-out). As a result of Utrecht's success, Ten Hag was appointed new head coach of Ajax with assistant De Jong taking over as head coach on 1 January 2018.

== Stadium ==
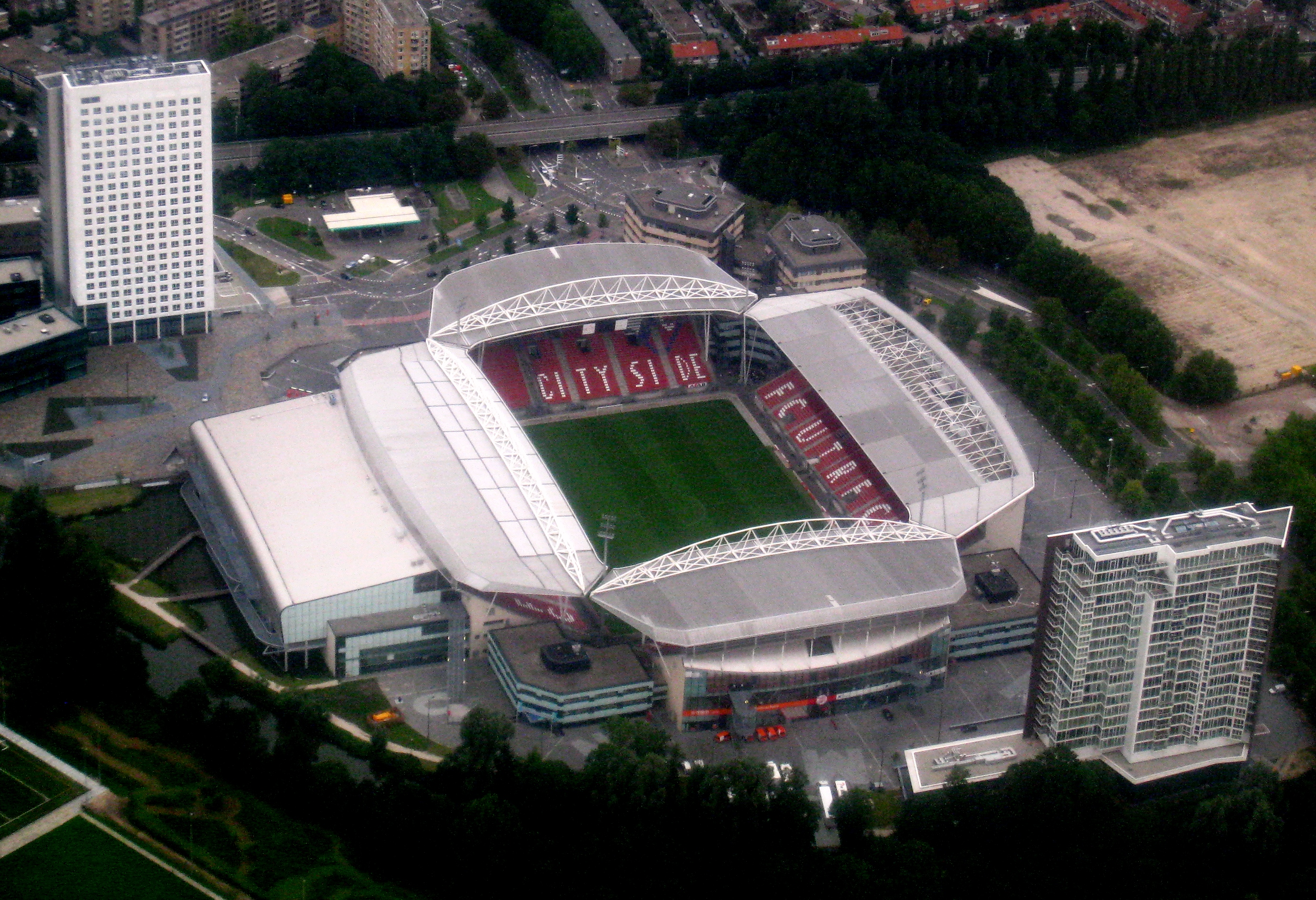
Aerial view of Stadion Galgenwaard

Utrecht's stadium is the Stadion Galgenwaard, previously named the Galgenwaard, then later the Nieuw Galgenwaard. It has a current capacity of 23,750 spectators. The attendance on average was 19,600 people in 2004–05, while the average attendance rose to 20,004 in 2006–07. The 2023–24 season saw an alltime high in average attendance with 20,500 people visiting on average. The stadium also accommodates several shops, offices and the supporters home of the Utrecht fan club (Supporters Vereniging Utrecht), one of the largest of its kind in Europe.

== Honours ==
=== National ===
- National champions (highest level of Dutch football)
  - Winners: 1957–58 (as VV DOS)
  - Runners-up: 1953–54 (as VV DOS)
- District champions (highest level of Dutch football before 1956–57)
  - Winners: 1953–54 (as VV DOS), 1955–56 (as USV Elinkwijk)
- Eerste divisie (second highest level of Dutch football)
  - Runners-up: 1964–65 (as USV Elinkwijk)
- Tweede Divisie (third highest level of Dutch football)
  - Winners: 1961–62 (as Velox)
  - Runners-up: 1969–70 (as Velox, joint with FC Wageningen but deciding match was never played because of the merger)
- KNVB Cup
  - Winners: 1984–85, 2002–03, 2003–04
  - Runners-up: 1981–82, 2001–02, 2015–16
  - Other: 2019–20 (final was cancelled due to the COVID-19 pandemic)
- Johan Cruijff Schaal
  - Winners: 2004
  - Runners-up: 2003

=== European ===
- Intertoto Cup/Summer Cup
  - Joint Winners: 1978

== Utrecht in European competitions ==
Utrecht's first competitive European match, in the team's current iteration (not as DOS), was on 17 September 1980, in the 1980–81 UEFA Cup, playing FC Argeş Piteşti to a 0–0 draw. Since then, the club has participated in fourteen UEFA competitions, advancing as far as the group stage in the 2004–05 UEFA Cup and the 2010–11 UEFA Europa League

Accurate as of 21 August 2025

Competition	Played	Won	Drew	Lost	GF	GA	GD	Win %
Cup Winners' Cup	2	1	0	1	3	5	−2	50.00
UEFA Cup / UEFA Europa League	60	21	18	21	83	76	+7	35.00
UEFA Intertoto Cup	2	0	2	0	1	1	+0	0.00
Total	64	22	20	22	87	82	+5	34.38

Source: UEFA.com
Pld = Matches played; W = Matches won; D = Matches drawn; L = Matches lost; GF = Goals for; GA = Goals against; GD = Goal Difference. Defunct competitions indicated in italics.

== UEFA Current ranking ==
As of 08 May 2026

Rank	Country	Team	Points
130	(Netherlands)	Go Ahead Eagles	11.690
131	(Netherlands)	FC Utrecht	11.690
132	(Netherlands)	Vitesse	11.690

== Domestic results ==
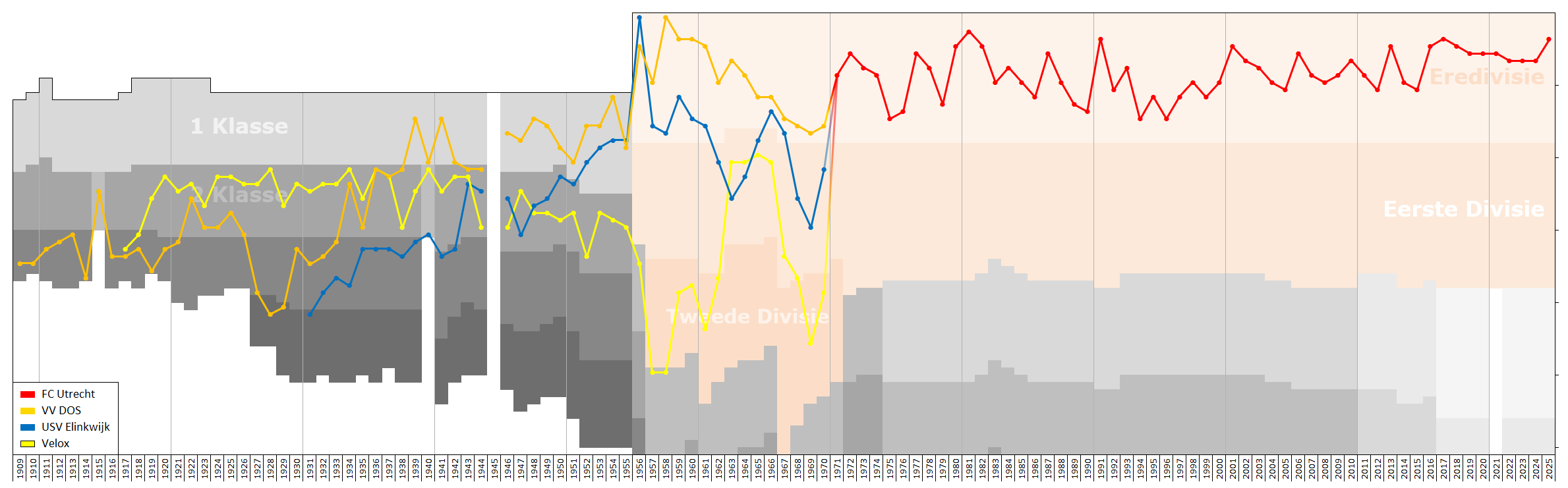
Historical chart of league performance

Below is a table with Utrecht's results since the introduction of the Eredivisie in 1956.

Domestic Results since 1956
Domestic league	League result	Qualification to	KNVB Cup season	Cup result
2025–26 Eredivisie	6th	Play-offs (losing the final)	2025–26	round of 16
2024–25 Eredivisie	4th	UEFA Europa League (Q3)	2024–25	quarter final
2023–24 Eredivisie	7th	Play-offs (losing the final)	2023–24	second round
2022–23 Eredivisie	7th	Play-offs (losing the semi-final)	2022–23	quarter final
2021–22 Eredivisie	7th	Play-offs (losing the semi-final)	2021–22	second round
2020–21 Eredivisie	6th	Play-offs (losing the final)	2020–21	second round
2019–20 Eredivisie	6th	–	2019–20	finalist (Note: On 24 April 2020, the 2019–20 Eredivisie and KNVB Cup seasons were prematurely terminates as a result of the COVID-19 pandemic in the Netherlands. As such, the final of the 2019–20 KNVB Cup was canceled with no club being appointed as winners.)
2018–19 Eredivisie	6th	UEFA Europa League (after winning EL play-offs) (Q2)	2018–19	round of 16
2017–18 Eredivisie	5th	–	2017–18	second round
2016–17 Eredivisie	4th	UEFA Europa League (after winning EL play-offs) (Q2)	2016–17	quarter final
2015–16 Eredivisie	5th	–	2015–16	final
2014–15 Eredivisie	11th	–	2014–15	second round
2013–14 Eredivisie	10th	–	2013–14	quarter final
2012–13 Eredivisie	5th	UEFA Europa League (after winning EL play-offs) (Q2)	2012–13	second round
2011–12 Eredivisie	11th	–	2011–12	second round
2010–11 Eredivisie	9th	–	2010–11	semi-final
2009–10 Eredivisie	7th	UEFA Europa League (after winning EL play-offs) (Q2)	2009–10	second round
2008–09 Eredivisie	9th	– (after losing EL play-offs)	2008–09	second round
2007–08 Eredivisie	10th	– (after losing UC play-offs)	2007–08	second round
2006–07 Eredivisie	9th	Intertoto Cup (after losing UC play-offs final)	2006–07	quarter final
2005–06 Eredivisie	6th	– (after losing UC play-offs)	2005–06	third round
2004–05 Eredivisie	11th	–	2004–05	round of 16
2003–04 Eredivisie	11th	UEFA Cup	2003–04	winners
2002–03 Eredivisie	8th	UEFA Cup	2002–03	winners
2001–02 Eredivisie	7th	UEFA Cup	2001–02	final
2000–01 Eredivisie	5th	UEFA Cup	2000–01	round of 16
1999–2000 Eredivisie	10th	–	1999–2000	quarter final
1998–99 Eredivisie	12th	–	1998–99	round of 16
1997–98 Eredivisie	10th	–	1997–98	group stage
1996–97 Eredivisie	12th	–	1996–97	group stage
1995–96 Eredivisie	15th	–	1995–96	second round
1994–95 Eredivisie	12th	–	1994–95	semi-final
1993–94 Eredivisie	15th	–	1993–94	third round
1992–93 Eredivisie	8th	–	1992–93	round of 16
1991–92 Eredivisie	11th	–	1991–92	quarter final
1990–91 Eredivisie	4th	UEFA Cup	1990–91	round of 16
1989–90 Eredivisie	14th	–	1989–90	second round
1988–89 Eredivisie	13th	–	1988–89	round of 16
1987–88 Eredivisie	10th	–	1987–88	first round
1986–87 Eredivisie	6th	UEFA Cup (after winning UC play-offs)	1986–87	round of 16
1985–86 Eredivisie	12th	–	1985–86	second round
1984–85 Eredivisie	10th	Cup Winners' Cup	1984–85	winners
1983–84 Eredivisie	8th	–	1983–84	second round
1982–83 Eredivisie	10th	–	1982–83	second round
1981–82 Eredivisie	5th	UEFA Cup	1981–82	final
1980–81 Eredivisie	3rd	UEFA Cup	1980–81	round of 16
1979–80 Eredivisie	5th	UEFA Cup	1979–80	round of 16
1978–79 Eredivisie	13th	–	1978–79	round of 16
1977–78 Eredivisie	8th	–	1977–78	round of 16
1976–77 Eredivisie	6th	–	1976–77	round of 16
1975–76 Eredivisie	14th	–	1975–76	second round
1974–75 Eredivisie	15th	–	1974–75	round of 16
1973–74 Eredivisie	9th	–	1973–74	semi-final
1972–73 Eredivisie	8th	–	1972–73	second round
1971–72 Eredivisie	6th	–	1971–72	first round
1970–71 Eredivisie	9th	–	1970–71	second round
1969–70 Eredivisie (as DOS); 1969–70 Eerste Divisie (as Elinkwijk); 1969–70 Tweede Divisie (as Velox)	6th 4th 3rd	–	1969–70	second round quarter final second round
1968–69 Eredivisie (as DOS); 1968–69 Eerste Divisie (as Elinkwijk); 1968–69 Tweede Divisie (as Velox)	17th 12th 10th	– (after surviving promotion/relegation play-off) – –	1968–69	first round second round first round
1967–68 Eredivisie (as DOS); 1967–68 Eerste Divisie (as Elinkwijk......and Velox)	16th 8th 19th	Inter-Cities Fairs Cup – Tweede Divisie (relegation)	1967–68	group stage quarter final second round
1966–67 Eredivisie (as DOS......and Elinkwijk); 1966–67 Eerste Divisie (as Velox)	15th 17th 16th	Inter-Cities Fairs Cup; Eerste Divisie (relegation) –	1966–67	first round second round DNC
1965–66 Eredivisie (as DOS......and Elinkwijk); 1965–66 Eerste Divisie (as Velox)	12th 14th 5th	Inter-Cities Fairs Cup – –	1965–66	second round group stage group stage
1964–65 Eredivisie (as DOS); 1964–65 Eerste Divisie (as Elinkwijk......and Velox)	12th 2nd 4th	Inter-Cities Fairs Cup; Eredivisie (promotion) –	1964–65	first round second round round of 16
1963–64 Eredivisie (as DOS); 1963–64 Eerste Divisie (as Elinkwijk......and Velox)	9th 7th 5th	Inter-Cities Fairs Cup – –	1963–64	first round first round round of 16
1962–63 Eredivisie (as DOS); 1962–63 Eerste Divisie (as Elinkwijk......and Velox)	7th 10th 5th	Inter-Cities Fairs Cup – –	1962–63	third round third round second round
1961–62 Eredivisie (as DOS); 1961–62 Eerste Divisie (as Elinkwijk); 1961–62 Tweede Divisie (as Velox)	10th 3rd (group B); 1st	– – Eerste Divisie (promotion)	1961–62	?
1960–61 Eredivisie (as DOS......and Elinkwijk); 1960–61 Tweede Divisie (as Velox)	5th 16th 8th	– Eerste Divisie (relegation) –	1960–61	?
1959–60 Eredivisie (as DOS......and Elinkwijk); 1959–60 Tweede Divisie (as Velox)	4th 15th 4th (group B)	– – (after surviving promotion/relegation play-off) –	not held	not held
1958–59 Eredivisie (as DOS......and Elinkwijk)	4th 12th	–	1958–59	?
1957–58 Eredivisie (as DOS......and Elinkwijk)	1st 16th	European Cup –	1957–58	?
1956–57 Eredivisie (as DOS......and Elinkwijk)	10th 16th	–	1956–57	?

== Players ==
=== Current squad ===
As of 11 September 2026

Note: Flags indicate national team as defined under FIFA eligibility rules; some limited exceptions apply. Players may hold more than one non-FIFA nationality.

No.	Pos.	Nation	Player
1	GK	GRE	Vasilis Barkas
2	DF	BEL	Siebe Horemans
3	DF	BEL	Matisse Didden
5	DF	CYP	Nikolas Panayiotou
6	MF	NED	Guus Offerhaus
7	FW	DEN	Victor Jensen
8	MF	NED	Joris van Overeem (captain)
9	FW	UKR	Artem Stepanov (on loan from Bayer 04 Leverkusen)
10	FW	FRA	Yoann Cathline
11	FW	ESP	Ángel Alarcón
15	FW	ENG	Adrian Blake
17	FW	NED	Sem van Duijn (on loan from AZ)
18	DF	CRO	Jakov Medić (on loan from Norwich City FC)
20	MF	NED	Dani de Wit
21	DF	SUR	Neville Ogidi Nwankwo

No.	Pos.	Nation	Player
22	GK	NED	Sergio Padt
23	MF	DEN	Niklas Vesterlund
26	FW	IDN	Miliano Jonathans
27	MF	BEL	Alonzo Engwanda
29	FW	NED	Noah Ohio
30	MF	USA	Kevin Paredes
31	GK	NED	Mees Eppink
32	DF	NED	Per Kloosterboer
33	GK	NED	Kevin Gadellaa
34	MF	NED	Davy van den Berg
38	MF	MAR	Oualid Agougil
39	MF	MAR	Nordin Amrabat
47	FW	GER	Emmanuel Chigozie Owen
80	FW	NOR	Marius Broholm (on loan from LOSC Lille)
92	MF	BFA	Arthur Zagré

=== Out on loan ===
Note: Flags indicate national team as defined under FIFA eligibility rules; some limited exceptions apply. Players may hold more than one non-FIFA nationality.

No.	Pos.	Nation	Player
—	MF	ENG	Emeka Adiele (at Burton Albion FC until 30 June 2027)
—	FW	MAR	Rafik El Arguioui (at SC Cambuur until 30 June 2027)
—	FW	TUR	Emirhan Demircan (at Telstar until 30 June 2027)
—	FW	NED	David Min (at Arminia Bielefeld until 30 June 2027)

=== Retired numbers ===
No.	Pos.	Player	From	Reason
4	DF	(France) David Di Tommaso	2005	Posthumous honour

=== Records ===
As of 17 May 2017
Players in bold text are still active.

Top Goalscorers
No.	Player	Goals	Utrecht career
1	Leo van Veen	153	1970–1982, 1983–1984
2	John van Loen	52	1983–1988, 1996–1998
3	Dirk Kuyt	51	1998–2003
=	Ton de Kruijk	51	1976–1988
5	Michael Mols	50	1996–1999, 2004–2005
6	**Sébastien Haller**	**44**	**2015–2017, 2025-**
=	Willy Carbo	44	1979–1983
8	Erik Willaarts	42	1986–1990
9	Stefaan Tanghe	40	2000–2005
10	Igor Gluščević	39	2000–2003

== Former players ==
=== National team players ===
The following players were called up to represent their national teams in international football and received caps during their tenure with FC Utrecht:

- Australia
  - (Australia) Tommy Oar (2010–2015)
  - (Australia) Adam Sarota (2010–2016)
  - (Australia) Michael Zullo (2010–2015)
  Belgium
  - (Belgium) Dries Mertens (2009–2011)
  - (Belgium) Stefaan Tanghe (2000–2005)
  - (Belgium) Stijn Vreven (2002–2003)
  Bosnia & Herzegovina
  - (Bosnia and Herzegovina) Dario Đumić (2017–2020)
  Curaçao
  - (Curaçao) Dylan Timber (2022–2023)
  Czech Republic
  - (Czech Republic) Václav Černý (2019–2021)
  Denmark
  - (Denmark) Jørgen Henriksen (1970–1976)
  - (Denmark) Michael Silberbauer (2008–2011)
  - (Denmark) Morten Skoubo (2008–2011)
  - (Denmark) John Steen Olsen (1969–1974)
  Estonia
  - (Estonia) Rocco Robert Shein (2022–2023)
  Finland
  - (Finland) Paulus Roiha (2002–2003)
  Gambia
  - (The Gambia) Leon Guwara (2018–2021)
  Ghana
  - (Ghana) Nana Akwasi Asare (2009–2013)
  - (Ghana) Francis Dickoh (2006–2010)
- Greece
  - (Greece) Anastasios Douvikas (2021–2023)
  Guadeloupe
  - (Guadeloupe) Franck Grandel (2005–2008)
  - (Guadeloupe) Loïc Loval (2007–2010)
  Hungary
  - (Hungary) Tibor Dombi (2000–2002)
  Iceland
  - (Iceland) Kolbeinn Finnsson (2024–2025)
  Indonesia
  - (Indonesia) **Miliano Jonathans (2025–present)**
  - (Indonesia) Ivar Jenner (2023–2026)
  Iraq
  - (Iraq) Zidane Iqbal (2023–2026)
  Ivory Coast
  - (Ivory Coast) **Sébastien Haller (2025–present)**
  Mali
  - (Mali) Modibo Sagnan (2023–2024)
  Morocco
  - (Morocco) Sofyan Amrabat (2014–2017)
  - (Morocco) Adil Ramzi (2006)
  Netherlands
  - (Netherlands) Dave van den Bergh (2000–2006)
  - (Netherlands) Hans van Breukelen (1975–1982)
  - (Netherlands) Willem van Hanegem (1979–1981)
  - (Netherlands) Johan de Kock (1987–1994)
  - (Netherlands) John van Loen (1983–1988; 1996–1998)
  - (Netherlands) Michael Mols (1996–1999; 2004–2005)
- **Netherlands** (continued)
  - (Netherlands) Kevin Strootman (2011)
  - (Netherlands) Jens Toornstra (2013–2014; 2022–2025)
  - (Netherlands) Michel Vorm (2005–2011)
  - (Netherlands) Ricky van Wolfswinkel (2009–2011)
  - (Netherlands) Jan Wouters (1980–1986)
  Nigeria
  - (Nigeria) Azubuike Oliseh (1999–2001; 2001–2002)
  Norway
  - (Norway) Erik Mykland (1995)
  Paraguay
  - (Paraguay) Gatito Fernández (2011–2012)
  Poland
  - (Poland) Włodzimierz Smolarek (1990–1996)
  Romania
  - (Romania) Mihai Neșu (2008–2012)
  Scotland
  - (Scotland) Scott Booth (1998)
  United States
  - (United States) Juan Agudelo (2014)
  - (United States) Taylor Booth (2022–2025)
  - (United States) Rubio Rubin (2014–2017)
  Zambia
  - (Zambia) Jacob Mulenga (2009–2014)

- Players in bold actively play for FC Utrecht and for their respective national teams. Years in brackets indicate careerspan with Utrecht.

=== National team players by Confederation ===
Member associations are listed in order of most to fewest current and former FC Utrecht players represented internationally

Total national team players by confederation
Confederation	Total	(Nation) Association
AFC	6	Australia (3), Indonesia (2), Iraq (1)
CAF	9	Ghana (2), Morocco (2), (The Gambia) Gambia (1), Ivory Coast (1), Mali (1), Nigeria (1), Zambia (1)
CONCACAF	6	United States (3), Guadeloupe (2), Curaçao (1)
CONMEBOL	1	Paraguay (1)
OFC	0	
UEFA	28	Netherlands (11), Denmark (4), Belgium (2), Bosnia and Herzegovina (1), Czech Republic (1), Estonia (1), Finland (1), Greece (1), Hungary (1), Iceland (1), Norway (1), Poland (1), Romania (1), Scotland (1)

== Players in international tournaments ==
The following is a list of FC Utrecht players who have competed in international tournaments, including the FIFA World Cup, UEFA European Championship, Africa Cup of Nations, AFC Asian Cup, CONCACAF Gold Cup, and the Caribbean Cup. To this date no FC Utrecht players have participated in the Copa América, or the OFC Nations Cup while playing for FC Utrecht.

Cup	Players
(Italy) UEFA Euro 1980	(Netherlands) Hans van Breukelen
(France) 1998 FIFA World Cup	(Scotland) Scott Booth
(United States) 2007 CONCACAF Gold Cup	(Guadeloupe) Franck Grandel (Guadeloupe) Loïc Loval
(Jamaica) 2008 Caribbean Cup	(Guadeloupe) Loïc Loval
(United States) 2009 CONCACAF Gold Cup	(Guadeloupe) Loïc Loval
(Angola) 2010 Africa Cup of Nations	(Zambia) Jacob Mulenga
(South Africa) 2010 FIFA World Cup	(Netherlands) Michel Vorm
(Qatar) 2011 AFC Asian Cup	(Australia) Tommy Oar
(South Africa) 2013 Africa Cup of Nations	(Zambia) Jacob Mulenga
(Brazil) 2014 FIFA World Cup	(Australia) Tommy Oar
(Australia) 2015 AFC Asian Cup	(Australia) Tommy Oar
(Qatar) 2023 AFC Asian Cup	(Iraq) Zidane Iqbal (Indonesia) Ivar Jenner
(Morocco) 2025 Africa Cup of Nations	(Ivory Coast) Sébastien Haller
(Canada) (Mexico) (United States) 2026 FIFA World Cup	(Iraq) Zidane Iqbal

== Board and staff ==
=== Current staff ===
Position	Name
Head coach	(Netherlands) Anthony Correia
Assistant coach	(Netherlands) Willem Janssen
Assistant coach	(Netherlands) Gertjan Tamerus
Assistant coach	(Netherlands) Kevin van Veen
Specialist/line coach	(Netherlands) Robbert Michielsen
Goalkeeper coach	(Netherlands) Harald Wapenaar

== List of FC Utrecht coaches ==
- (Netherlands) Bert Jacobs (1 July 1970 – 30 June 1974)
- (Netherlands) Jan Rab (1974–76)
- (Netherlands) Han Berger (1 Jan 1976 – 30 June 1983)
- (Wales) Barry Hughes (1983–84)
- (Netherlands) Nol de Ruiter (1 July 1984 – 30 June 1987)
- (Netherlands) Han Berger (1 July 1987 – 30 June 1989)
- (Netherlands) Cees Loffeld (1989–90)
- (Netherlands) Ab Fafié (17 Oct 1990 – 17 Feb 1993)
- (Netherlands) Henk Vonk (caretaker) (17 Feb 1993 – Sept 16, 1993)
- (Netherlands) Leo van Veen (Sept 17, 1993–30 June 1995)
- (Netherlands) Ton du Chatinier and (Netherlands) Henk Vonk (1995)
- (Netherlands) Simon Kistemaker (1 July 1995 – 30 Nov 1995)
- (Netherlands) Nol de Ruiter (caretaker) (30 Nov 1995 – 23 Jan 1996)
- (Netherlands) Ronald Spelbos (18 Jan 1996 – 27 Nov 1997)
- (Netherlands) Jan Wouters (1997)
- (Netherlands) Mark Wotte (31 Dec 1997 – 28 March 2000)
- (Netherlands) Frans Adelaar (29 March 2000 – 30 June 2002)
- (Netherlands) Foeke Booy (1 July 2002 – 30 June 2007)
- (Netherlands) Willem van Hanegem (1 July 2007 – 23 Dec 2008)
- (Netherlands) Ton du Chatinier (24 Dec 2008 – 19 May 2011)
- (Netherlands) Erwin Koeman (1 July 2011 – 18 Oct 2011)
- (Netherlands) Jan Wouters (18 Oct 2011 – 30 June 2014)
- (Netherlands) Rob Alflen (1 July 2014 – 30 June 2015)
- (Netherlands) Erik ten Hag (1 July 2015 – 27 Dec 2017)
- (Netherlands) Jean-Paul de Jong (28 Dec 2017 – 4 Sep 2018)
- (Netherlands) Dick Advocaat (17 Sep 2018 – 30 June 2019)
- (Netherlands) John van den Brom (1 July 2019 – 6 November 2020)
- (Netherlands) René Hake (6 November 2020 – 22 March 2022)
- (Netherlands) Rick Kruys (caretaker) (22 March 2022 – 30 June 2022)
- (Netherlands) Henk Fraser (1 July 2022 – 14 December 2022)
- (Denmark) Michael Silberbauer (28 December 2022 – 29 August 2023)
- (Netherlands) Rob Penders (caretaker) (29 August 2023 – 11 September 2023)
- (Netherlands) Ron Jans (11 September 2023 – 30 June 2026)
- (Netherlands) Anthony Correia (1 July 2026 – present)

== Kit manufacturers ==
Period	Kit Manufacturer
1971–1976	Le Coq Sportif
1976–1979	Puma
1979–1981	Pony
1981–1983	Admiral
1983–1989	Puma
1989–1995	Lotto
1995–2001	Reebok
2001–2009	Puma
2009–2012	Kappa
2012–2019	Hummel
2019–2023	Nike
2023–	Castore

== See also ==
- Dutch football league teams
