= Erik Vonk =

- Born: 1953 (age 72–73); Indonesia (then part of the Dutch colonial territory)
- Education: Golden Gate University
- Occupations: Business executive, entrepreneur
- Years active: 1980s–present
- Known for: Former President & CEO of Randstad North America; Founder of Richland Rum
- Spouse: Karin Vonk

Erik Vonk (born 1953) is an American entrepreneur and author. Vonk is the former President and CEO of Randstad North America. He developed the concept of "FlexLife" that encourages workers to string together a self-managed, full-time career of short-term job assignments.

== Early life ==
Vonk was born in 1953 in Indonesia, which was then part of the Dutch colonial territory, to Dutch parents. He was raised and educated in the Netherlands. He immigrated to the United States in 1979 and obtained an MBA from Golden Gate University in 1984.

== Career ==
Vonk began his career in international banking, including Chase Manhattan Bank and ABN-AMRO Bank. He was president and CEO of Randstad North America and started the North American operations from scratch in 1992.

In 2002, Vonk became chairman and CEO of Gevity HR, Inc. Under Vonk's leadership, Gevity HR earned a spot on BusinessWeek's 2006 list of Hot Growth Companies.

== Bibliography ==
Vonk's 2001 book Don't Get a Job, Get a Life is about flexible employment and work/life balance.

== Personal life ==
He later moved to Georgia for farming and rum-distilling business with his wife Karin.
