= Willy Carbo =

Dutch footballer

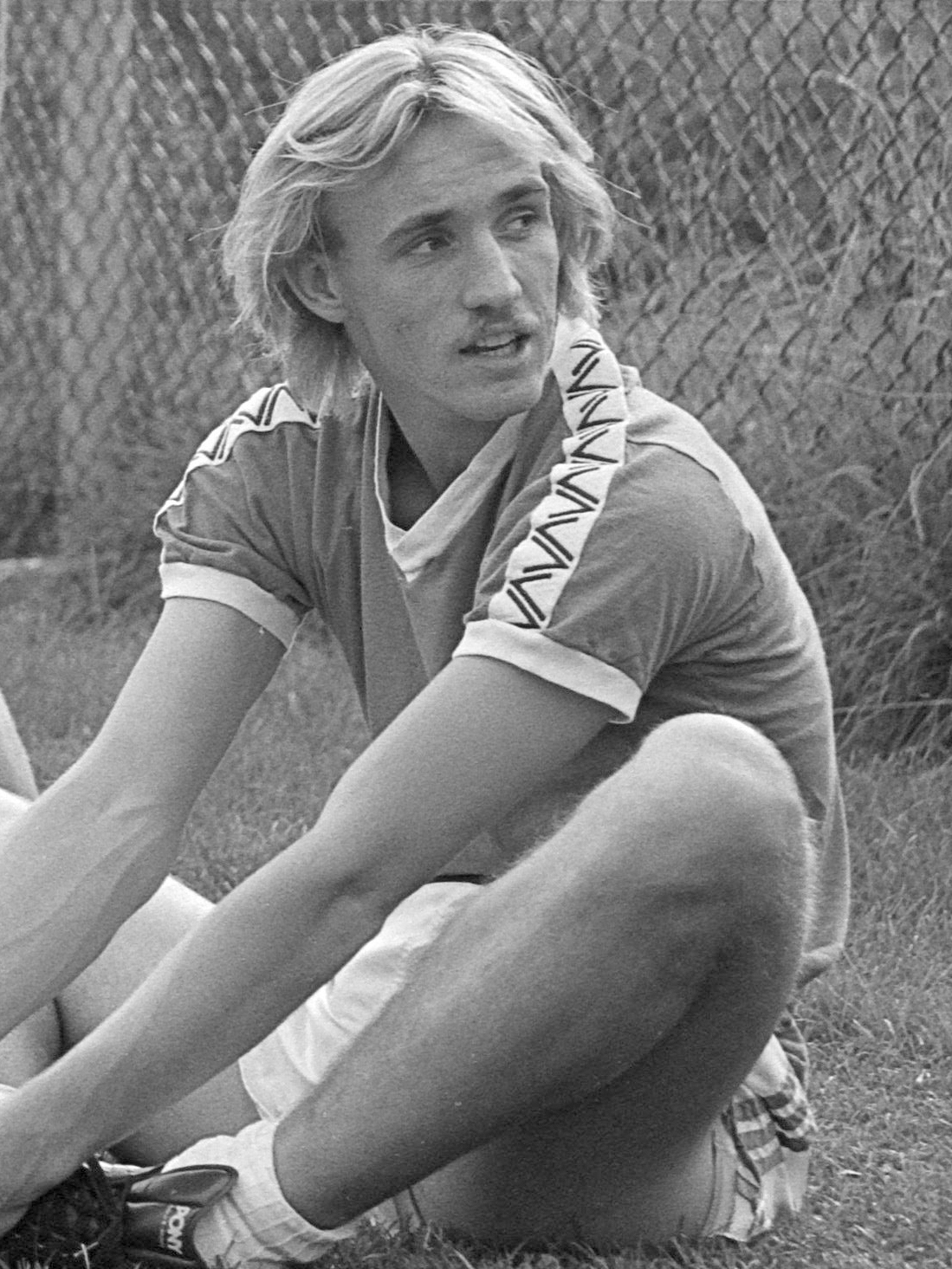
- Carbo in 1981

Personal information
- Full name: Willy Carbo
- Date of birth: 14 August 1959 (age 67)
- Place of birth: Utrecht, Netherlands
- Position: Forward

Youth career
- VV Utrecht
- FC Utrecht

Senior career*
| Years | Team | Apps | (Gls) |
| 1979–1983 | FC Utrecht | 106 | (43) |
| 1983–1984 | Club Brugge | 7 | (0) |
| 1984 | → Feyenoord (loan) | 6 | (0) |
| 1984–1987 | FC Twente | 44 | (17) |
| 1986–1987 | → RKC (loan) | 18 | (5) |
| 1987–1988 | NEC | 28 | (9) |
| 1988–1990 | Cambuur | 40 | (17) |
| Total | | 249 | (91) |

International career
| 1980-1981 | Netherlands U21 | 14 | (6) |
- * Club domestic league appearances and goals

Willy Carbo (born 14 August 1959 in Utrecht, Netherlands) is a retired Dutch footballer who played as a forward.

== Club career ==
He made his professional debut and scored the first goal for hometown club FC Utrecht in the game against Go Ahead Eagles on 16 March 1980. He became the club's top league goalscorer for three successive seasons. He moved abroad to play in Belgium for Club Brugge, only to be loaned to Feyenoord in the second half of the season and winning the Dutch Eredivisie in a team containing Johan Cruyff and Ruud Gullit. With Brugge he played in the 1983 Belgian Cup Final, losing to Beveren.

He later played for FC Twente, RKC, NEC and Cambuur where he finished his career.

=== Backheel goal ===
Carbo is mostly remembered for his famous backheel goal when he played for FC Twente against Go Ahead Eagles in September 1984.

== International career ==
Carbo played 14 games for the Netherlands national under-21 football team

== Personal life ==
Born in Utrecht, Carbo lives in Leeuwarden as of 2024 and is a grandfather of two.

== Honours ==
Feyenoord Rotterdam

- Eredivisie: 1983–84
- KNVB Cup: 1983–84
