= 1984–85 KNVB Cup =

Tournament details
- Country: Netherlands
- Teams: 64

Final positions
- Champions: FC Utrecht
- Runners-up: Helmond Sport

Tournament statistics
- Top goal scorer: Hallvar Thoresen (8)

The 1984-85 KNVB Cup 67th edition of the Dutch national football annual knockout tournament for the KNVB Cup. 46 teams contested, beginning on 20 October 1984 and ending at the final on 6 June 1985.

FC Utrecht beat Helmond Sport 1–0 and won the cup for the first time.

Replays were held if teams were tied after ninety minutes.

== Teams ==
- All 18 participants of the Eredivisie 1984-85
- All 18 participants of the Eerste Divisie 1984-85
- 28 teams from lower (amateur) leagues

== First round ==
The matches of the first round were played on 20-21 October 1984. The last six matches were played on 17-18 November.

Home team	Result	Away team
NAC _{E}	2–0	AZ'67 _{E}
VV Nieuw Lekkerland _{A}	3–3	PEC Zwolle _{E}
VV Noordwijk _{A}	4–2	SC Veendam _{1}
Pax Hengelo _{A}	1–7	HFC Haarlem _{E}
RCH _{A}	5–3	Dijka Steenwijk _{A}
ROHDA Raalte _{A}	0–0	FC Volendam _{E}
VV Sliedrecht _{A}	1–1	Excelsior _{E}
SV Spakenburg _{A}	1–1	SC Cambuur _{1}
De Treffers _{A}	1–3	ACV _{A}
Vitesse Arnhem _{1}	1–0	Roda JC _{E}
VV DOVO _{A}	0–5	Ajax _{E}
Kozakken Boys _{A}	0–2	FC Den Bosch _{E}
NSVV _{A}	4–2	NEC _{1}
Rijnsburgse Boys _{A}	4–1	SV De Valleivogels _{A}
VV Caesar _{A}	0–1	Zwolsche Boys _{A}
VV Geldrop/AEK _{A}	1–2	Sparta _{E}

Home team	Result	Away team
AFC _{A}	1–1	FC Wageningen _{1}
AFC '34 _{A}	1–2	RBC _{1}
DETO _{A}	7–0	RKSV Venlo _{A}
VV Drachten _{A}	1–2	Feyenoord _{E}
FC Eindhoven _{1}	0–5	Fortuna Sittard _{E}
USV Elinkwijk _{A}	0–5	PSV _{E}
FC Den Haag _{1}	2–1	SVV _{1}
FC Twente _{E}	4–0	DS '79 _{1}
VV Gilze _{A}	0–4	sc Heerenveen _{1} (at H'veen)
Go Ahead Eagles _{E}	2–0	RKC _{1}
De Graafschap _{1}	2–0	Willem II _{1}
'VV Heerjansdam' _{A}	3–2	FC Groningen _{E}
Helmond Sport _{1}	2–0	SC Heracles _{1}
IJsselmeervogels _{A}	1–4	FC VVV _{1}
TSV Longa _{A}	1–6	FC Utrecht _{E} (played at Utrecht)
MVV _{E}	2–1	Telstar _{1}

_{E} Eredivisie; _{1} Eerste Divisie; _{A} Amateur teams

=== Replays ===
Home team	Result	Away team
Excelsior	4–0	VV Sliedrecht
PEC Zwolle	3–1	VV Nieuw Lekkerland
SC Cambuur	3–1	SV Spakenburg
FC Volendam	2–0	ROHDA Raalte
FC Wageningen	3–2	AFC

== Second round ==
The matches of the second round were played on November 17 and 18, 1984.

Home team	Result	Away team
PSV	11–0	Rijnsburgse Boys
RBC	1–2	FC Volendam
SC Cambuur	1–1	Vitesse Arnhem
FC Wageningen	3–2	RCH
Ajax	6–0	VV Heerjansdam (in December 2011)
FC Den Bosch	2–0	FC VVV (in December 2011)
FC Utrecht	4–0	Zwolsche Boys (on February 6, 1985)
Sparta	5–1	NSVV (on February 6, 1985)

Home team	Result	Away team
FC Den Haag	0–2	Helmond Sport
FC Twente	8–0	De Graafschap
Feyenoord	1–2	Excelsior
Go Ahead Eagles	2–1	PEC Zwolle
HFC Haarlem	2–0	ACV
sc Heerenveen	1–3	Fortuna Sittard
MVV	5–0	VV Noordwijk
NAC	8–2	DETO

=== Replay ===
Home team	Result	Away team
Vitesse Arnhem	2–0	SC Cambuur

== Round of 16 ==
The matches of the round of 16 were played on March 13, 1985.

Home team	Result	Away team
Ajax	1–1	PSV
Excelsior	0–0	MVV
FC Twente	2–2	FC Den Bosch
FC Utrecht	2–0	FC Volendam
Fortuna Sittard	0–3	Go Ahead Eagles
NAC	1–1	Helmond Sport
Sparta	2–1	HFC Haarlem
Vitesse Arnhem	0–1	FC Wageningen

=== Replays ===
Home team	Result	Away team
FC Den Bosch	6–3	FC Twente
Helmond Sport	(p) 3-3	NAC
MVV	2–0	Excelsior
PSV	2–0	Ajax

== Quarter finals ==
The quarter finals were played on March 27, 1985.

Home team	Result	Away team
FC Den Bosch	1–2	Helmond Sport
MVV	1–1	PSV
Sparta	0–2	FC Utrecht
FC Wageningen	2–0	Go Ahead Eagles

=== Replay ===
Home team	Result	Away team
PSV	6–3	MVV

== Semi-finals ==
The semi-finals were played on May 7, 1985.

Home team	Result	Away team
FC Utrecht	0–0	PSV
FC Wageningen	1–1	Helmond Sport

=== Replays ===
The replays were played on May 21 and 22, 1985.

Home team	Result	Away team
Helmond Sport	2–1	FC Wageningen
PSV	2–2 (p)	FC Utrecht

== Final ==
6 June 1985

Utrecht	1–0	Helmond Sport
Van Loen 90'

Stadion Galgenwaard, Utrecht
Attendance: 18,000
Referee: Piet Bosman

FC Utrecht would play in the Cup Winners' Cup.
