= 2025–26 ADO Den Haag season =

ADO Den Haag
2025–26 season
- Manager: (Germany) Robin Peter
- Stadium: ADO Den Haag Stadium
- Eerste Divisie: 1st
- KNVB Cup: First Round
Home colours	colours	colours

2025–26 was the 121st season of ADO Den Haag, a Dutch football club. During this season the club participated in the Eerste Divisie and the KNVB Cup.

== Current squad ==
As of 17 September 2026

No.	Pos.	Nation	Player
1	GK	BFA	Kilian Nikiema
2	DF	NED	Othniël Raterink (on loan from Cagliari)
3	DF	NED	Pascal Mulder
4	DF	BEL	Matteo Waem
5	DF	DEN	Jonas Jensen-Abbew
7	FW	NED	Daryl van Mieghem (captain)
8	MF	CZE	Jan Žambůrek
9	FW	NED	Jesse Bal
10	FW	NED	Illaijh de Ruijter
11	FW	NED	Evan Rottier
12	GK	NED	Sem Eekhout
14	MF	NED	Mylian Jimenez
15	DF	NED	Milan Hokke
16	MF	NED	Finn de Bruin
17	FW	USA	Jalen Hawkins

No.	Pos.	Nation	Player
18	DF	GUI	Sekou Sylla
19	FW	AUT	Luka Reischl
20	GK	KEN	Caleb Kramer
21	FW	AUS	Cameron Peupion
22	DF	GER	Lasse Wilhelm
23	GK	GER	Niclas Thiede
24	FW	ESP	Álex Pozo
25	MF	FIN	Juho Kilo
27	FW	CUW	Nigel Thomas
32	FW	NED	Dani van Loenen
33	MF	CZE	Matěj Šín (on loan from AZ)
35	DF	SUR	Sanyika Bergtop
46	FW	CZE	Yannick Eduardo (on loan from TSG Hoffenheim)
77	FW	HUN	Donát Bárány

=== Out on loan ===
No.	Pos.	Nation	Player
—	FW	NED	Senna Westerveld (at Quick Boys until 30 June 2027)

== Pre-season and friendlies ==
Win Draw Loss Fixtures

5 July 2025 Friendly	Laakkwartier (Netherlands)	0–15	(Netherlands) ADO Den Haag
14:00		Report	de Bruin 18' 18' 22'; van Mieghem 24'; Peupion 25'; van der Sloot 26'; Waem 39'; Ersi Bode 52'; Illaijh de Ruijter 65' 75'; Amin el Harchaoui 73' 83'; Joey Brandt 76'; Hämäläinen 77'; Mohammad 87'

12 July 2025 Friendly	Sparta Rotterdam (Netherlands)	2–0	(Netherlands) ADO Den Haag	Rotterdam
14:00	Mito 12'; Clement 17'	Report		Stadium: Sparta Stadion

19 July 2025 Friendly	ADO Den Haag (Netherlands)	3–1	(Belgium) Francs Borains	The Hague
14:00	Reischl 12'; Peupion (yellow card) 16'; Vlak 45+2' (pen.); Amin el Harchaoui 71'	Report	Lima 3'	Stadium: WerkTalent Stadion

25 July 2025 Friendly	ADO Den Haag (Netherlands)	0–0	(England) Norwich City	The Hague
19:00	Hokke (yellow card) 34'	Report		Stadium: WerkTalent Stadion

29 July 2025 Friendly	ADO Den Haag (Netherlands)	1–1	(Greece) OFI Crete	The Hague
18:00	Philippe Lanquetin (yellow card) 40'; Sylla 82'	Report	Emmanouil Faitakis 17'	Stadium: WerkTalent Stadion

3 August 2025 Friendly	ADO Den Haag (Netherlands)	2–3	(Greece) Olympiacos	The Hague
15:00	Sylla 71'; Ruben Silva-Richards (yellow card) 79' (goal) 85'	Report	Strefezza (yellow card) 6'; El Kaabi 12' 19' 65'; Biancone (yellow card) 56'; Kalogeropoulos (yellow card) 77'	Stadium: WerkTalent Stadion

== Competitions ==
=== Overall record ===
Competition	First match	Last match	Starting round	Final position	Record							
Competition	First match	Last match	Starting round	Final position	Pld	W	D	L	GF	GA	GD	Win %
Eerste Divisie	10 August 2025	24 April 2026	Matchday 1	1st	38	29	2	7	90	37	+53	76.32
KNVB Cup	28 October 2025	28 October 2025	First round	First round	1	0	0	1	4	5	−1	0.00
Total					39	29	2	8	94	42	+52	74.36

Last updated: 3 October 2026
Source: Soccerway

=== Eerste Divisie ===
==== League table ====
Pos	Team	Pld	W	D	L	GF	GA	GD	Pts	Promotion or qualification
1	ADO Den Haag (Note: Winner of the First and Second Period (Rounds 1–10 and 11–20)) (C, P)	38	29	2	7	90	37	+53	89	Promotion to the Eredivisie
2	Cambuur (Note: Winner of the Third Period (Rounds 21–29)) (P)	38	23	9	6	75	48	+27	78	Promotion to the Eredivisie
3	Willem II (Note: Winner of the Fourth Period (Round 30–38)) (O, P)	38	20	8	10	59	42	+17	68	Qualification for promotion play-offs quarterfinals
4	De Graafschap	38	18	9	11	74	58	+16	63	Qualification for promotion play-offs quarterfinals
5	Almere City	38	18	4	16	78	63	+15	58	Qualification for promotion play-offs first round

Source: Flashscore, Keuken Kampioen Divisie (in Dutch)
Rules for classification: Season in progress: 1) Most points won; 2) Less points lost; 3) Goal difference; 4) Goals scored; 5) Head-to-head points; 6) Head-to-head goal difference; 7) Head-to-head goals scored 8) Head-to-head away goals scored 9) Alphabetical order; End of season: 1) Points; 2) Goal difference; 3) Goals scored; 4) Head-to-head points; 5) Head-to-head goal difference; 6) Head-to-head goals scored 7) Head-to-head away goals scored; 8) Extra match or series of matches 9) Goal difference (series of matches) 10) Goals scored (series of matches) 11) Penalty shoot-out (extra match or series of matches)
(C) Champions; (O) Play-off winners; (P) Promoted

==== Results summary ====
Overall								Home						Away					
Pld	W	D	L	GF	GA	GD	Pts	W	D	L	GF	GA	GD	W	D	L	GF	GA	GD
38	29	2	7	90	37	+53	89	15	1	3	49	18	+31	14	1	4	41	19	+22

Last updated: 24 April 2026.
Source: worldfootball

==== Results by round ====
Round	1	2	3	4	5	6	7	8	9	10
Ground	H	A	H	H	A	A	H	A	H	A
Result	W	D	D	W	W	W	W	W	W	W
Position	1	6	7	6	3	2	2	1	1	1

Updated to match(es) played on 3 October 2025. Source:
A = Away; H = Home; W = Win; D = Draw; L = Loss

==== Matches ====
10 August 2025 1	ADO Den Haag	5–1	Willem II	The Hague
16:45 CEST (UTC+2)	Reischl 36'; Sylla 52'; van Mieghem 56'; Illaijh de Ruijter 63'; van der Sloot 72'	Report	Sigurgeirsson (yellow card) 17' (yellow-red card) 68'; Meerveld 40'	Stadium: WerkTalent Stadion; Attendance: 7,845; Referee: (Netherlands) Sander van der Eijk

18 August 2025 2	Jong FC Utrecht	2–2	ADO Den Haag	Utrecht
20:00 CEST (UTC+2)	Emirhan Demircan 47' (yellow card) 48'; Jesse van de Haar 63'	Report	Reischl 52' (yellow card) 88'; Vlak 67' (pen.)	Stadium: Stadion Galgenwaard; Attendance: 805; Referee: (Netherlands) Rick Sturm

29 August 2025 4	ADO Den Haag	2–0	Helmond Sport	The Hague
20:00 CEST (UTC+2)	Jimenez (yellow card) 36'; Hokke (yellow card) 45'; Thomas (yellow card) 74'; Vlak 85' (pen.); Illaijh de Ruijter 90'	Report	Bergsen (yellow card) 68'; Daneels (yellow card) 83'; Justin Ogenia (yellow card) 88'	Stadium: WerkTalent Stadion; Attendance: 8,245; Referee: (Netherlands) Dennis Higler

12 September 2025 5	FC Eindhoven	0–1	ADO Den Haag	Eindhoven
20:00 CEST (UTC+2)	Blummel (yellow card) 28'; Huisman (yellow card) 63'	Report	Vlak (yellow card) 60'; Rottier 66'	Stadium: Jan Louwers Stadion; Attendance: 2,514; Referee: (Netherlands) Jannick van der Laan

15 September 2025 6	Jong Ajax	1–3	ADO Den Haag	Amsterdam
20:00 CEST (UTC+2)	Zakaria Ouazane 83'	Report	Waem 8'; Rottier 38'; Bal 52'; Reischl (yellow card) 84'	Stadium: Sportpark De Toekomst; Attendance: 966; Referee: (Netherlands) Rick Sturm

19 September 2025 7	ADO Den Haag	2–1	Almere City	The Hague
20:00 CEST (UTC+2)	Engel 25' (o.g.); Peupion 38'; Waem (yellow card) 53'	Report	Kadile (yellow card) 17'; Jacobs (yellow card) 24'; Amoah Foah Sam (yellow card) 32'; Bas Huisman (yellow card) 36'; Providence (red card) 84'; Jacobs 90+3'; Jereno van Gom (yellow card) 90+4'	Stadium: WerkTalent Stadion; Attendance: 10,120; Referee: (Netherlands) Clay Ruperti

26 September 2025 8	RKC Waalwijk	1–3	ADO Den Haag	Waalwijk
20:00 CEST (UTC+2)	Uneken 8'; Altena (yellow card) 90+5'	Report	Kilo (yellow card) 39'; Bal 45+2'; Reischl 71'; van der Sloot 83'	Stadium: Mandemakers Stadion; Attendance: 5,686; Referee: (Netherlands) Martin van den Kerkhof

29 September 2025 9	ADO Den Haag	5–1	TOP Oss	The Hague
20:00 CEST (UTC+2)	Bal 7'; Tomás 26'; Thomas (yellow card) 28'; Reischl 36'; Vlak 45+2' 77'; Jimenez (yellow card) 86'	Report	Hinoke (yellow card) 28'; Wildeboer 45'; Julian Kuijpers (yellow card) 65'; Kas de Wit (yellow card) 79'	Stadium: WerkTalent Stadion; Attendance: 8,325; Referee: (Netherlands) Erwin Blank

3 October 2025 10	Jong AZ	0–4	ADO Den Haag	Alkmaar
20:00 CEST (UTC+2)	Mathijs Menu (yellow card) 4'; Kasper Boogaard (yellow card) 61'; Kiani Inge (yellow card) 90+2'	Report	Rottier 8'; Bal (yellow card) 20'; Sylla (yellow card) 34'; van Mieghem 64'; Reischl 72'; Peupion 90+3'	Stadium: AFAS Trainingscomplex; Attendance: 827; Referee: (Netherlands) Stan Teuben

17 October 2025 11	ADO Den Haag	3–0	Dordrecht	The Hague
20:00 CET (UTC+2)	van Mieghem 49'; Bal 57'; Vlak 90+3'	Report	Venema (yellow card) 24'; Marouane Afaker (yellow card) 77'	Stadium: WerkTalent Stadion; Attendance: 12,700; Referee: (Netherlands) Bas Nijhuis

20 October 2025 12	Jong PSV	0–3	ADO Den Haag	Eindhoven
20:00 CET (UTC+2)	Ayodele Thomas (yellow card) 63'; Fabian Merién (yellow card) 64'; Michael Bresser (yellow card) 74'	Report	Sylla (yellow card) 23'; Waem (yellow card) 28'; Kilo 29'; Peupion 47'; Tomás 80'; de Bruin (yellow card) 84'	Stadium: De Herdgang; Attendance: 827; Referee: (Netherlands) Rick Sturm

25 October 2025 13	ADO Den Haag	2–1	Den Bosch	The Hague
16:30 CET (UTC+2)	Vlak 15'; van der Sloot 33'	Report	Wang Bohao (yellow card) 52'; Monzialo 53'	Stadium: WerkTalent Stadion; Attendance: 12,453; Referee: (Netherlands) Alex Bos

=== KNVB Cup ===
First round	–
--:-- CET (UTC+1)
