= Aad de Jong =

Dutch association football player

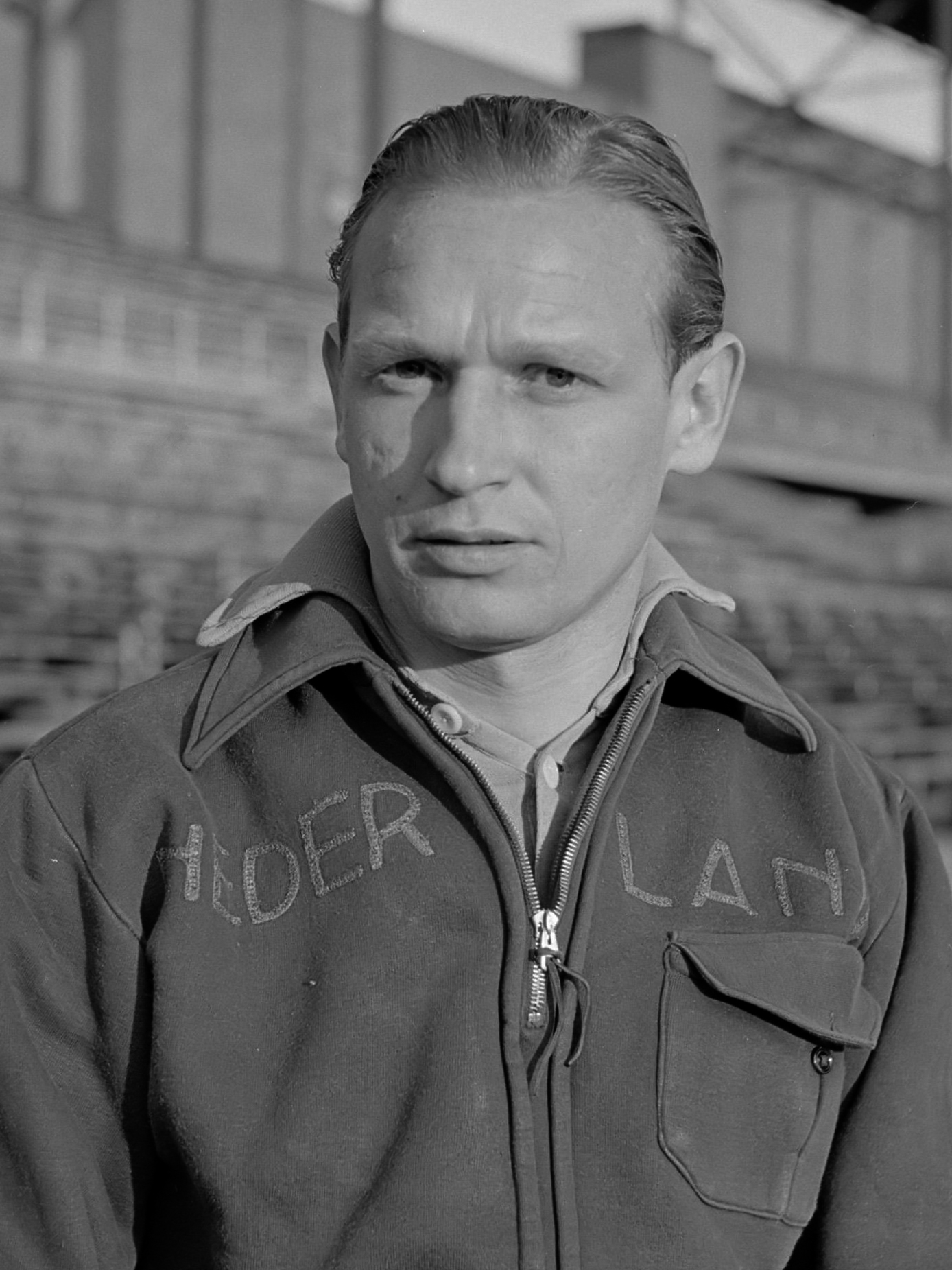
- De Jong in 1951

Personal information
- Full name: Adrianus Cornelis de Jong
- Date of birth: 1 December 1921
- Place of birth: The Hague, Netherlands
- Date of death: 29 August 2003 (aged 81)
- Place of death: Moerdijk, Netherlands
- Position: Defender

Senior career*
Years	Team	Apps	(Gls)
1937–1955	ADO Den Haag		

International career
1950–1952	Netherlands	5	(0)
- * Club domestic league appearances and goals

Adrianus Cornelis "Aad" de Jong (1 December 1921 – 29 August 2003) was a Dutch footballer. He played for ADO Den Haag and five times in the Netherlands national football team.

== Club career ==
De Jong became a member of ADO at the age of eight; At 16, he first appeared in stadium Elf der Haager. Twice in a row, 1942 and 1943, this team was the Dutch champion, alongside the left defender as de Jong, including Gerrit Vreeken, Herman Choufoer (as team captain) and André Roosenburg, and later ADO coach and football champion Rinus Loof. He remained faithful to the ADO for 18 seasons and the club appointed him as an honorary member. After finishing his active career, he worked as a trainer at HBS Craeyenhout and Quick (H).

== International career ==
Just three weeks before his 29th birthday, de Jong made his debut in the Oranje Elftal - at times when many of his teammates such as Vreeken, Bram Appel, Theo Timmermans and Toon Bauman had already gone to France as professionals or were on the go. The Dutch defensive line on 12 November 1950 - with de Jong, Sjef Mertens (in his only international match) and Jan van Schijndel - allowed in this game, however, goalkeeper Piet Kraak had to seize seven times. The score against Belgium was 2:7 in Antwerp against Belgium. A 2:5 defeat against France was followed again by a 5:4 against Belgium. At two more defeats, de Jong was in the Oranje cover, and a few more times he was sitting on the bench as a substitute. In his last game, again in Belgium in April 1952, the later Belgian national teammate Guy Thys was his direct opponent.
