= ADO Den Haag =

Dutch association football club

- Nicknames: Den Haag (The Hague); De Residentieclub (The Residence Club); De Ooievaars (The Storks)
- Short name: ADO Den Haag
- Founded: 1 February 1905; 121 years ago
- Stadium: Werktalent Stadion
- Capacity: 15,000
- Owner: Global Football Holdings
- Chairman: Natascha van Grinsven-Admiraal
- Head coach: Maurice Steijn
- League: Eredivisie
- 2025–26: Eerste Divisie, 1st of 20 (promoted)
- Website: adodenhaag.nl
Home colours	Away colours	Third colours

Alles Door Oefening Den Haag (Dutch pronunciation: [ˈɑləz doːr ˈufənɪŋ dɛn ˈɦaːx]), commonly known by the abbreviated name ADO Den Haag ([ˈaːdoː dɛn ˈɦaːx]), is a Dutch association football club from the city of The Hague. They play in the Eredivisie, the top tier of Dutch football, following promotion from the Eerste Divisie in the 2025–26 season. The club was for a time known as FC Den Haag ([ɛfˈseː dɛn ˈɦaːx]), with ADO representing the amateur branch of the club. Despite being from one of the traditional three large Dutch cities, it has not been able to match Ajax, Feyenoord or PSV in terms of success in the Eredivisie or in European competition. There is nonetheless a big rivalry with Ajax and Feyenoord. The Dutch words "Alles Door Oefening" translate into Everything Through Practice.

== History ==
=== 1905–1971: ADO ===
On 1 February 1905, the club Alles Door Oefening (ADO) was founded in café 'Het Hof van Berlijn' (now: De Paap) in The Hague. In the first years of its existence, the club endured some difficult times as many members refused to pay their fees. ADO started out in the local Haagsche Voetbal Bond, but promoted to the national Nederlandsche Voetbal Bond in 1912. That year they promoted to the third level (3e klasse NVB) and two years later they even earned the championship on that level.

After moving to the Zuiderpark stadium in 1925, ADO continued to grow to a club of some significance. In 1926, the club earned promotion to the highest national level, the Eerste Klasse. In the following years the red-green-white team struggled not to be relegated at first, but rose to the top of the league at the end of the 1930s. In 1939 the club just missed the class title after losing to DWS in Amsterdam. In 1940, the title seemed very close again, but another second-place finish was the highest achievable position after the club saw many players being drafted in the army with World War II closing in. This time another club from Amsterdam, Blauw-Wit, grabbed the title. In 1941, ADO finally won their class and moved on to the national champion's competition, losing that to Heracles. During the war, the club was regarded as one collaborating with the German occupiers due to only three people being members of the NSB: outside right Gerrie Vreken, honorary chairman Chris Leurs and secretary Joop van der Valk. . A prolific goalscorer, Vreken started working for the Arbeidsdienst to avoid being sent to work in Germany and later became a NSB member. He is not named among the players who won the league at the club's website due to his dubious past.

In the 1941–42 season, all the stars were aligned, and although the war made everyday life harder and harder, the club seemed undefeatable. After winning their league, often by many goals difference, ADO moved on to the national champion's competition and fought for the title with Heerenveen, AGOVV, Eindhoven and Blauw-Wit. A 5–2 victory over AGOVV finally brought ADO their first national title. In 1943 ADO won another title, amongst others by beating legend Abe Lenstra's Heerenveen 8–2.

The Hague had to wait until the 1960s for more successes from their local club. After Ernst Happel joined ADO as a coach in 1962, the club worked their way to the top of the league again. They finished third in the final ranking in 1965. In 1963, 1964 and 1966, ADO played in the national cup final, the KNVB Cup, but lost. In 1968, they again reached the final, and this time beat Ajax to win it. In the 1970–71 season, ADO started the league with 17 games undefeated and were at the top of the national league, but ended their season as No. 3.

In 1967, ADO played a summer in North America's United Soccer Association, under the name San Francisco Golden Gate Gales. The club finished tied for second in the Western Division.

=== 1971–1996: FC Den Haag ===
In 1971 the club merged with city rivals Holland Sport to form FC Den Haag.

The club again reached the Dutch Cup final in 1972 (this time losing 3–2 to Ajax) then went on to win the trophy for a second time in 1975, this team defeating Twente 1–0. Their greatest European success was a quarter-final game against West Ham United for the European Cup Winners Cup in 1976. A 4–2 win in The Hague followed by a 3–1 defeat in London meant elimination. In the 1980s, FC Den Haag was often associated with hooliganism and financial backfall. However, they reached their fourth Dutch Cup final in 1987, losing 4–2 (again to Ajax) following two extra-time winners from Marco van Basten.

On 3 April 1982, hooligans of the club burned down part of their own home ground, Zuiderpark Stadion. The fire was set after a 4–0 loss to HFC Haarlem. It damaged the ground's oldest stand dating back to 1928 and caused $500,000 in damages. The damaged part was rebuilt and opened in 1986.

After another merger the club was renamed ADO Den Haag in 1996.

=== 1996–present: ADO Den Haag ===
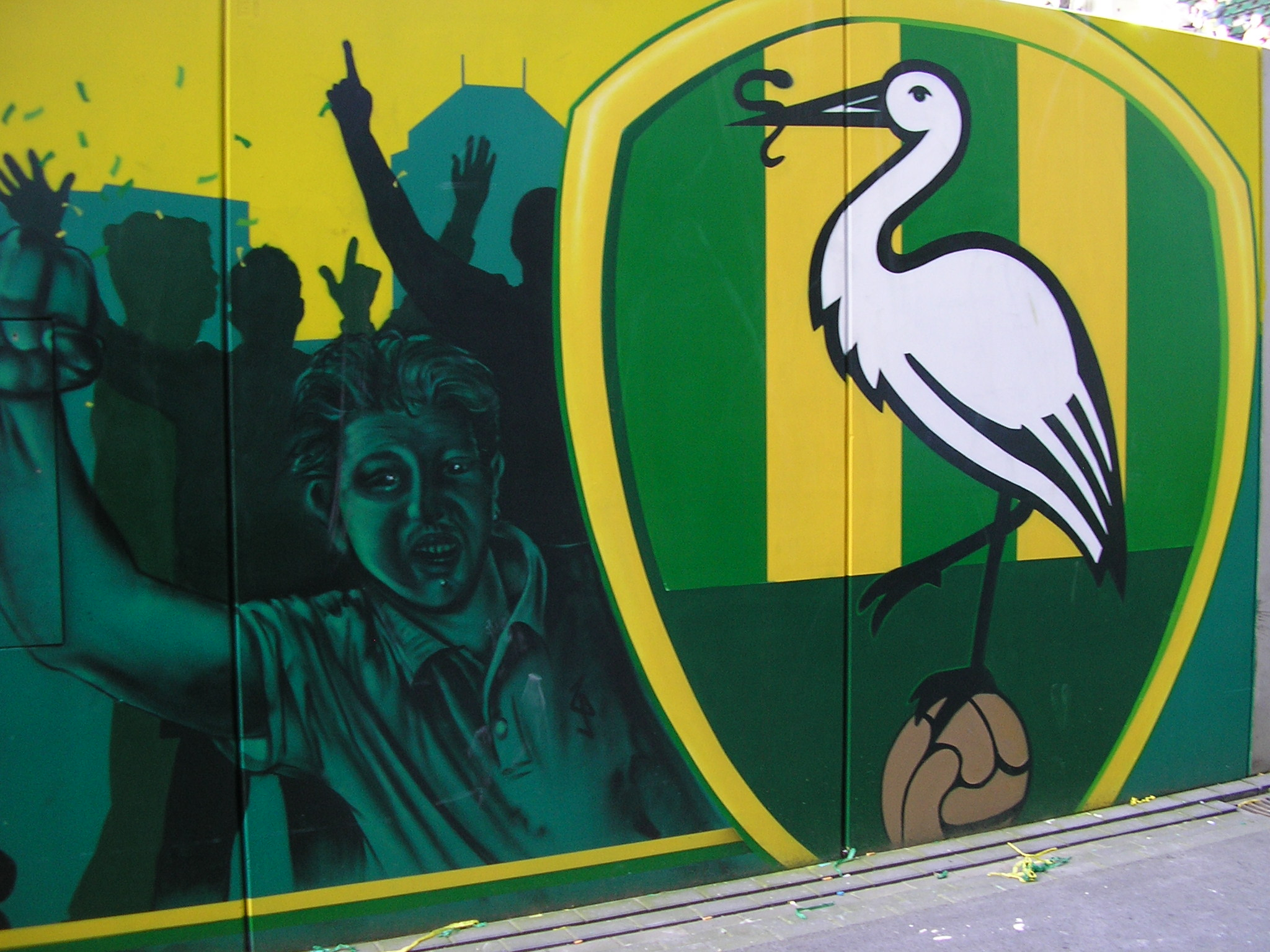
Mural in the new ADO stadium

After a long spell in the country's second tier of league football, ADO Den Haag played four seasons in the Eredivisie then were relegated again in the 2006–07 season. However, after finishing sixth in the 2007–08 season, they went on to win the play-offs, meaning promotion back to the Eredivisie for 2008–09. The club's new home was finished in 2007: the 15,000-capacity Kyocera Stadion, formerly known as the Den Haag Stadion. Their home colors are yellow and green. They began the 2008–09 season with two wins which put them on top of the Eredivisie for the first time in 32 years. In the 2009–10 season, the club's average home attendance was 11,745 spectators.

The team enjoyed success in the 2010–11 season. Defeating rivals Ajax twice was one of the highlights of the season. ADO Den Haag finished seventh in the league and won the play-offs (beating Roda JC and Groningen) which offered the last Dutch UEFA Europa League place. They won the first matches against Lithuanian side Tauras (3–2, 2–0) but lost the first away leg for the third qualifying round against Cypriot club Omonia 3–0 in Nicosia.

ADO supporters have strong links with Welsh club Swansea City. Flags of the respective clubs are often flown at the matches of the other club, and both clubs regularly hold pre-season friendly matches. Legia Warsaw (Poland), Club Brugge (Belgium) and Juventus (Italy) also share strong supporter links with ADO Den Haag.

The club was in serious financial trouble in 2008 and in June 2014, its majority shareholder agreed to sell the club to Chinese-based United Vansen International Sports Company, Ltd. for a reported $8.9 million. The current ownership group has "promised to invest millions of euros" into the club. UVS was founded in 2008 and was responsible for organising the Beijing Olympic closing ceremony and football curtain-raisers attracting prominent football clubs such as Juventus, Milan, Internazionale, Napoli, Lazio, Tottenham Hotspur, West Ham United and Hull City.

The 2019–20 season was declared void, with no promotion/relegation, which meant ADO Den Haag remained in Eredivisie for the 2020–21 season despite their 17th-place finish. In 2021, ADO Den Haag was relegated to the Eerste Divisie. The same year, American investment company Global Football Holdings, owned by David Blitzer, purchased majority shares in the club from United Vansen.

== Sponsors ==
Period	Kit manufacturer	Shirt sponsor
1982–1983	Adidas	Daihatsu
1983–1986	Adidas	Hotelplan Vakanties
1987–1989	Cruyff	Hotelplan Vakanties
1992–1993	Lotto	Doeland
1993–1994	Lotto	Hans Verkerk Keukens
1994–1999	Lotto	VHS
1999–2000	Wilson	Client Solutions
2000–2001	Wilson	Solidium
2001–2002	Fila	Solidium
2002–2004	Fila	Hommerson Casino's
2004–2005	Hummel	Hommerson Casino's
2005–2008	Hummel	DSW
2008–2011	Hummel	Fit For Free
2011–2012	Erreà	Kyocera
2012–2017	Erreà	Basic Fit
2018–2022	Erreà	Cars Jeans
2023–2025	Erreà	Hommerson Casino's
2025–2026	Erreà	ADOgroen
2026–	Erreà	Zelesta

== Honours ==
Eredivisie (up to 1955–56 the Netherlands Football League Championship)

- Champions: 1941–42, 1942–43

Eerste Divisie

- Champions: 1956–57, 1985–86, 2002–03, 2025–26
- Promotion to Eredivisie: 1988–89, 2007–08

KNVB Cup

- Champions: 1967–68, 1974–75
- Runners-up: 1958–59, 1962–63, 1963–64, 1965–66, 1971–72, 1986–87

== European record ==
UEFA Europa League / UEFA Cup

Season	Round	Opponents	Home leg	Away leg	Aggregate
1971–72	1	(Luxembourg) Aris Bonnevoie	5–0	2–2	7–2
1971–72	2	(England) Wolves	1–3	0–4	1–7
2011–12	Q2	(Lithuania) Tauras	2–0	3–2	5–2
2011–12	Q3	(Cyprus) Omonia	1–0	0–3	1–3

UEFA Cup Winners' Cup

Season	Round	Opponents	Home leg	Away leg	Aggregate
1968–69	1	(Austria) Grazer AK	4–1	2–0	6–1
1968–69	2	(Germany) 1. FC Köln	0–1	0–3	0–4
1972–73	1	(Soviet Union) Spartak Moscow	0–0	0–1	0–1
1975–76	1	(Denmark) Vejle BK	2–0	2–0	4–0
1975–76	2	(France) Lens	3–2	3–1	6–3
1975–76	QF	(England) West Ham United	4–2	1–3	5–5
1987–88	1	(Hungary) Újpest Dósza	3–1	0–1	3–2
1987–88	2	(Switzerland) BSC Young Boys	2–1	0–1	2–2

== Domestic results ==
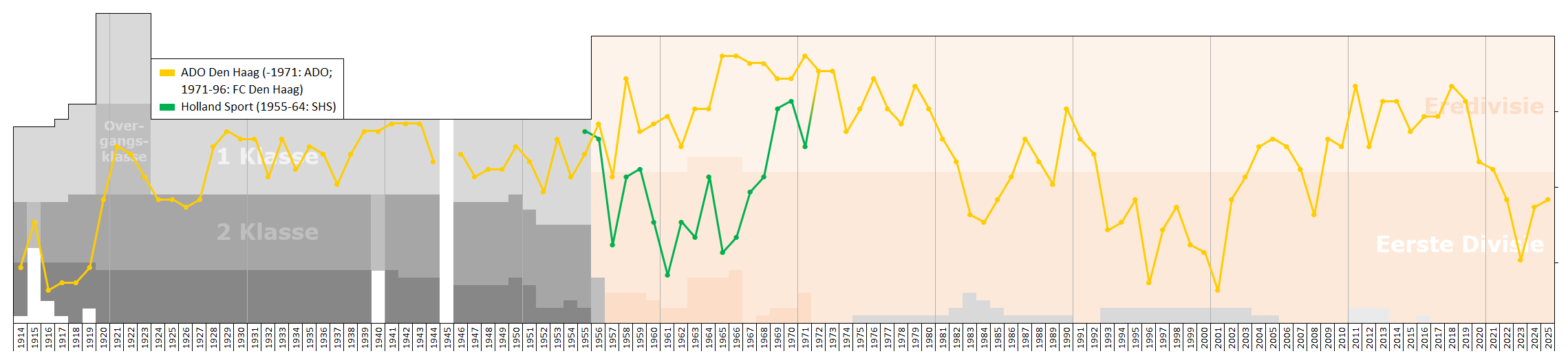
Historical chart of league performance

Below is a table with ADO Den Haag's domestic results since the introduction of the Eredivisie in 1956.

Domestic Results since 1956
Domestic league	League result	Qualification to	KNVB Cup season	Cup result
2025–26 Eerste Divisie	1st	Eredivisie (promotion)	2025–26	first round
2024–25 Eerste Divisie	4th	promotion/relegation play-off: no promotion	2024–25	first round
2023–24 Eerste Divisie	5th	promotion/relegation play-off: no promotion	2023–24	quarter final
2022–23 Eerste Divisie	12th	–	2022–23	quarter final
2021–22 Eerste Divisie	4th	promotion/relegation play-off: no promotion	2021–22	round of 16
2020–21 Eredivisie	18th	Eerste Divisie (relegation)	2020–21	round of 16
2019–20 Eredivisie	17th		2019–20	first round
2018–19 Eredivisie	9th	–	2018–19	second round
2017–18 Eredivisie	7th	–	2017–18	first round
2016–17 Eredivisie	11th	–	2016–17	third round
2015–16 Eredivisie	11th	–	2015–16	second round
2014–15 Eredivisie	13th	–	2014–15	second round
2013–14 Eredivisie	9th	–	2013–14	third round
2012–13 Eredivisie	9th	–	2012–13	third round
2011–12 Eredivisie	15th	–	2011–12	third round
2010–11 Eredivisie	7th	Europa League (winning EL play-offs) (Q2)	2010–11	fourth round
2009–10 Eredivisie	15th	–	2009–10	second round
2008–09 Eredivisie	14th	–	2008–09	round of 16
2007–08 Eerste Divisie	6th	Eredivisie (winning promotion/releg. play-offs)	2007–08	third round
2006–07 Eredivisie	18th	Eerste Divisie (relegation)	2006–07	third round
2005–06 Eredivisie	15th	–	2005–06	third round
2004–05 Eredivisie	14th	–	2004–05	quarter final
2003–04 Eredivisie	15th	–	2003–04	second round
2002–03 Eerste Divisie	1st	Eredivisie (promotion)	2002–03	round of 16
2001–02 Eerste Divisie	4th	promotion/relegation play-off: no promotion	2001–02	second round
2000–01 Eerste Divisie	16th	–	2000–01	second round
1999–2000 Eerste Divisie	11th	–	1999–2000	third round
1998–99 Eerste Divisie	10th	–	1998–99	second round
1997–98 Eerste Divisie	5th	promotion/relegation play-off: no promotion	1997–98	second round
1996–97 Eerste Divisie	8th	promotion/relegation play-off: no promotion	1996–97	group stage
1995–96 Eerste Divisie	15th	–	1995–96	round of 16
1994–95 Eerste Divisie	4th	promotion/relegation play-off: no promotion	1994–95	round of 16
1993–94 Eerste Divisie	7th	promotion/relegation play-off: no promotion	1993–94	quarter final
1992–93 Eerste Divisie	8th	–	1992–93	third round
1991–92 Eredivisie	16th	Eerste Divisie (losing prom./relegation play-off)	1991–92	third round
1990–91 Eredivisie	14th	–	1990–91	round of 16
1989–90 Eredivisie	10th	–	1989–90	second round
1988–89 Eerste Divisie	2nd	Eredivisie (promotion)	1988–89	semi-final
1987–88 Eredivisie	17th	Eerste Divisie (relegation)	1987–88	round of 16
1986–87 Eredivisie	14th	Cup Winners' Cup	1986–87	final
1985–86 Eerste Divisie	1st	Eredivisie (promotion)	1985–86	semi-final
1984–85 Eerste Divisie	4th	promotion/relegation play-off: no promotion	1984–85	second round
1983–84 Eerste Divisie	7th	–	1983–84	round of 16
1982–83 Eerste Divisie	6th	–	1982–83	round of 16
1981–82 Eredivisie	17th	Eerste Divisie (relegation)	1981–82	second round
1980–81 Eredivisie	14th	–	1980–81	second round
1979–80 Eredivisie	10th	–	1979–80	quarter final
1978–79 Eredivisie	7th	–	1978–79	round of 16
1977–78 Eredivisie	12th	–	1977–78	second round
1976–77 Eredivisie	10th	–	1976–77	semi-final
1975–76 Eredivisie	6th	–	1975–76	round of 16
1974–75 Eredivisie	10th	Cup Winners' Cup	1974–75	winners
1973–74 Eredivisie	13th	–	1973–74	second round
1972–73 Eredivisie	5th	–	1972–73	quarter final
1971–72 Eredivisie	5th	Cup Winners' Cup	1971–72	final
1970–71 Eredivisie (as ADO......and Holland Sport)	3rd 15th	UEFA Cup –	1970–71	quarter final round of 16
1969–70 Eredivisie (as ADO......and Holland Sport)	6th 9th	–	1969–70	quarter final first round
1968–69 Eredivisie (as ADO......and Holland Sport)	6th 10th	–	1968–69	round of 16 first round
1967–68 Eredivisie (as ADO); 1967–68 Eerste Divisie (as Holland Sport)	4th 1st	Cup Winners' Cup; Eredivisie (promotion)	1967–68	winners group stage
1966–67 Eredivisie (as ADO); 1966–67 Eerste Divisie (as Holland Sport)	4th 3rd	–	1966–67	round of 16 first round
1965–66 Eredivisie (as ADO); 1965–66 Eerste Divisie (as Holland Sport)	3rd 11th	–	1965–66	final group stage
1964–65 Eredivisie (as ADO); 1964–65 Eerste Divisie (as Holland Sport)	3rd 13th	–	1964–65	second round quarter final
1963–64 Eredivisie (as ADO); 1963–64 Eerste Divisie (as SHS)	10th 3rd	–	1963–64	final round of 16
1962–63 Eredivisie (as ADO); 1962–63 Eerste Divisie (as SHS)	10th 11th	–	1962–63	final
1961–62 Eredivisie (as ADO); 1961–62 Eerste Divisie (as SHS)	15th 7th (group B)	– – (after surviving promotion/relegation play-off)	1961–62	third round
1960–61 Eredivisie (as ADO); 1960–61 Eerste Divisie (as SHS)	11th 14th (group B)	–	1960–61	second round
1959–60 Eredivisie (as ADO); 1959–60 Eerste Divisie (as SHS)	12th 7th (group B)	–	not held	not held
1958–59 Eredivisie (as ADO......and SHS)	13th 18th	– Eerste Divisie (relegation)	1958–59	final
1957–58 Eredivisie (as ADO); 1957–58 Eerste Divisie (as SHS)	6th 1st (group B)	– Eredivisie (promotion)	1957–58	third round
1956–57 Eerste Divisie (as ADO......and SHS)	1st 10th	Eredivisie (promotion) –	1956–57	semi finals

== Current squad ==
As of 17 September 2026

No.	Pos.	Nation	Player
1	GK	BFA	Kilian Nikiema
2	DF	NED	Othniël Raterink (on loan from Cagliari)
3	DF	NED	Pascal Mulder
4	DF	BEL	Matteo Waem
5	DF	DEN	Jonas Jensen-Abbew
7	FW	NED	Daryl van Mieghem (captain)
8	MF	CZE	Jan Žambůrek
9	FW	NED	Jesse Bal
10	FW	NED	Illaijh de Ruijter
11	FW	NED	Evan Rottier
12	GK	NED	Sem Eekhout
14	MF	NED	Mylian Jimenez
15	DF	NED	Milan Hokke
16	MF	NED	Finn de Bruin
17	FW	USA	Jalen Hawkins

No.	Pos.	Nation	Player
18	DF	GUI	Sekou Sylla
19	FW	AUT	Luka Reischl
20	GK	KEN	Caleb Kramer
21	FW	AUS	Cameron Peupion
22	DF	GER	Lasse Wilhelm
23	GK	GER	Niclas Thiede
24	FW	ESP	Álex Pozo
25	MF	FIN	Juho Kilo
27	FW	CUW	Nigel Thomas
32	FW	NED	Dani van Loenen
33	MF	CZE	Matěj Šín (on loan from AZ)
35	DF	SUR	Sanyika Bergtop
46	FW	CZE	Yannick Eduardo (on loan from TSG Hoffenheim)
77	FW	HUN	Donát Bárány

=== Out on loan ===
No.	Pos.	Nation	Player
—	FW	NED	Senna Westerveld (at Quick Boys until 30 June 2027)

== Coaching staff ==
Position	Name
Head coach	(Netherlands) Maurice Steijn
Assistant coach	(Netherlands) Jay Driessen (Netherlands) Levi Schwiebbe
Head of goalkeeping	(Germany) Nico Hildebrandt
Goalkeeper Coach	(Syria) Kawa Hesso
Head of Performance	(Greece) Theo Kastanidis
Physical coach	(Netherlands) Luuk Truijens
Physiotherapist	(Netherlands) Edwin Coret
Equipment manager	(Netherlands) Rob Ravestein
Club Physician	(Netherlands) Bas Bulder
Video Analyst	(Netherlands) Nick Boere

== Former players ==
=== National team players ===
The following players were called up to represent their national teams in international football and received caps during their tenure with ADO Den Haag:

- Aruba
  - (Aruba) Gregor Breinburg (2021–2023)
  Bonaire
  - (Bonaire) Jort van der Sande (2023–2024)
  Burkina Faso
  - (Burkina Faso) **Kilian Nikiema (2019–present)**
  Chinese Taipei
  - (Chinese Taipei) Emilio Estevez (2020–2021)
  Curaçao
  - (Curaçao) Elson Hooi (2017–2020)
  - (Curaçao) Papito Merencia (2013–2015)
  - (Curaçao) Daniël Rijaard (2002–2005; 2006–2008) (Note: A Dutch-born footballer, Daniël Rijaard represented Netherlands Antilles internationally, prior to the countries dissolution in 2010, with Curaçao considered by both UEFA and FIFA as the only inherit successor to the national team of former Netherlands Antilles.)
  - (Curaçao) Xander Severina (2021–2023)
  - (Curaçao) **Nigel Thomas (2026–present)**
  Denmark
  - (Denmark) Niels-Christian Holmstrøm (1969–1970)
  Estonia
  - (Estonia) Andres Oper (2010)
  Finland
  - (Finland) Joonas Kolkka (2005–2006)
  Guinea
  - (Guinea) **Sekou Sylla (2024–present)**
  Indonesia
  - (Indonesia) Rafael Struick (2022–2024)
  Israel
  - (Israel) Ilay Elmkies (2020–2021)
  Ivory Coast
  - (Ivory Coast) Wilfried Kanon (2013–2019)
  Jamaica
  - (Jamaica) Ravel Morrison (2020–2021)
- Japan
  - (Japan) Mike Havenaar (2015–2017)
  Kenya
  - (Kenya) **Caleb Kramer (2025–present)**
  Lithuania
  - (Lithuania) Ernestas Šetkus (2016–2017)
  Luxembourg
  - (Luxembourg) Dirk Carlson (2022–2023)
  Netherlands
  - (Netherlands) Kees Aarts (1963–1969)
  - (Netherlands) Henk Breitner (1926–1934)
  - (Netherlands) Herman Choufoer (1939–1943)
  - (Netherlands) Mick Clavan (1943–1954; 1956–1962)
  - (Netherlands) Wietze Couperus (1970–1972)
  - (Netherlands) Guus Haak (1956–1963)
  - (Netherlands) Harry Heijnen (1962–1967; 1967–1969)
  - (Netherlands) Aad de Jong (1937–1955)
  - (Netherlands) Joop Lankhaar (1984–1988)
  - (Netherlands) Henk van Leeuwen (1974–1981)
  - (Netherlands) Aad Mansveld (1964–1977; 1979–1981; 1981–1982)
  - (Netherlands) Kees Quax (1924–1934; 1937–1938)
  - (Netherlands) Carol Schuurman (1953–1963)
  - (Netherlands) Gerard Tap (1922–1938)
  - (Netherlands) Wim Tap (1920–1936)
  - (Netherlands) Theo Timmermans (1946–1950; 1954–1961)
  - (Netherlands) Jan Villerius (1961–1968)
- **Netherlands** (continued)
  - (Netherlands) Mauk Weber (1930–1934; 1937–1939)
  - (Netherlands) Piet de Zoete (1962–1971)
  Nigeria
  - (Nigeria) Tyronne Ebuehi (2014–2018)
  - (Nigeria) Kenneth Omeruo (2012–2013)
  Northern Ireland
  - (Northern Ireland) Lee Bonis (2024–2025)
  Norway
  - (Norway) Roger Albertsen (1975–1979; 1980–1981)
  - (Norway) Harald Berg (1970–1974)
  - (Norway) Tor Fuglset (1972–1973)
  - (Norway) Harry Hestad (1970–1972)
  Philippines
  - (Philippines) Paul Mulders (2011–2013)
  Poland
  - (Poland) Tomasz Rząsa (2005–2006)
  Slovakia
  - (Slovakia) Csaba Horváth (2008–2010)
  - (Slovakia) František Kubík (2010–2011)
  Slovenia
  - (Slovenia) Aleksandar Radosavljević (2010–2013)
  Suriname
  - (Suriname) Dhoraso Klas (2021–2024)
  Uganda
  - (Uganda) Melvyn Lorenzen (2017–2019)
  United States
  - (United States) Cory Gibbs (2005–2006)
  - (United States) John O'Brien (2005–2006)

- Players in bold actively play for ADO Den Haag and for their respective national teams. Years in brackets indicate careerspan with ADO Den Haag.

=== National team players by Confederation ===
Member associations are listed in order of most to least amount of current and former ADO Den Haag players represented Internationally

Total national team players by confederation
Confederation	Total	(Nation) Association
AFC	4	Chinese Taipei (1), Indonesia (1), Japan (1), Philippines (1)
CAF	7	Nigeria (2), Burkina Faso (1), Guinea (1), Ivory Coast (1), Kenya (1), Uganda (1)
CONCACAF	11	Curaçao (5), United States (2), Aruba (1), Bonaire (1), Jamaica (1), Suriname (1)
CONMEBOL	0	
OFC	0	
UEFA	34	Netherlands (19), Norway (4), Slovakia (2), Denmark (1), Estonia (1), Finland (1), Israel (1), Lithuania (1), Luxembourg (1), Northern Ireland (1), Poland (1), Slovenia (1)

== Former managers ==
- (England) John Donaghy (1928–32)
- (Netherlands) Wim Tap (1936–46)
- (Austria) Franz Fuchs (1952–53)
- (England) Dick Groves (1953)
- (Austria) Franz Gutkas (1954–55)
- (Netherlands) Rinus Loof (1955–62)
- (Austria) Ernst Happel (1 July 1962 – 30 June 1969)
- (Czechoslovakia) Václav Ježek (1 July 1969 – 30 June 1972)
- (Socialist Federal Republic of Yugoslavia) Vujadin Boškov (1 July 1974 – 30 June 1976)
- (Czechoslovakia) Anton Malatinský (1 July 1976 – 30 June 1978)
- (Netherlands) Piet de Visser (1 July 1978 – 30 June 1980)
- (Netherlands) Hans Kraay (1 July 1980 – 30 June 1981)
- (Netherlands) Cor van der Hart (1 July 1981 – 30 June 1983)
- (Netherlands) Rob Baan (1 July 1983 – 30 June 1986)
- (Netherlands) Pim van de Meent (1 July 1986 – 30 June 1988)
- (Netherlands) Co Adriaanse (1 July 1988 – 12 February 1992)
- (Netherlands) Nol de Ruiter (1 July 1992 – 30 June 1993)
- (Netherlands) Lex Schoenmaker (1994–95)
- (Netherlands) Theo Verlangen (1995–96)
- (Netherlands) Mark Wotte (1 July 1996 – 31 December 1997)
- (Netherlands) André Hoekstra (31 December 1997 – 30 June 1999)
- (Netherlands) Rob Meppelink (1 July 1999 – 30 June 2000)
- (Netherlands) Stanley Brard (1 July 2000 – 5 April 2001)
- (Netherlands) Piet de Zoete (caretaker) (5 April 2001 – 30 June 2001)
- (Netherlands) Rinus Israel (1 July 2001 – 30 November 2003)
- (Netherlands) Lex Schoenmaker (caretaker) (1 December 2003 – 30 June 2004)
- (Netherlands) Frans Adelaar (1 July 2004 – 20 November 2006)
- (Netherlands) Lex Schoenmaker (caretaker) (21 November 2006 – 30 June 2007)
- (Netherlands) Wiljan Vloet (1 July 2007 – 30 June 2008)
- (Netherlands) André Wetzel (1 July 2008 – 17 April 2009)
- (Netherlands) Raymond Atteveld (17 April 2009 – 30 March 2010)
- (Netherlands) Maurice Steijn (caretaker) (30 March 2010 – 30 June 2010)
- (Netherlands) John van den Brom (1 July 2010 – 29 June 2011)
- (Netherlands) Maurice Steijn (30 June 2011 – 5 February 2014)
- (Netherlands) Henk Fräser (5 February 2014 – 30 June 2016)
- (Montenegro) Željko Petrović (1 July 2016 – 7 February 2017)
- (Netherlands) Alfons Groenendijk (8 February 2017 – 2 December 2019)
- (England) Alan Pardew (24 December 2019 – 28 April 2020)
- (Serbia) Aleksandar Ranković (15 May 2020 – 9 November 2020)
- (Netherlands) Ruud Brood (10 November 2020 – 28 February 2022)
- (Netherlands) Giovanni Franken (caretaker) (28 February 2022 – 1 June 2022)
- (Netherlands) Dirk Kuyt (2 June 2022 – 24 November 2022)
- (Netherlands) Dick Advocaat (28 November 2022 – 28 June 2023)
- (Bosnia and Herzegovina) Darije Kalezić (29 June 2023 – 29 June 2025)
- (Germany) Robin Peter (14 July 2025 – 2 November 2026)
- (Netherlands) Maurice Steijn (13 November 2026 – Present)
