= Dano Lourens =

Dutch footballer (born 2004)

Personal information
- Full name: Dano Lourens
- Date of birth: 4 March 2004 (age 22)
- Place of birth: Middelburg, Netherlands
- Position: Forward

Team information
- Current team: Terrassa
- Number: 11

Youth career
- –2014: Zeelandia
- 2014–2015: JVOZ
- 2015–2020: NAC Breda
- 2020–2021: VV Kloetinge

Senior career*
| Years | Team | Apps | (Gls) |
| 2021–2022 | VV Kloetinge | | |
| 2022–2024 | Sparta Rotterdam | 1 | (0) |
| 2022–2024 | Jong Sparta Rotterdam | 51 | (16) |
| 2024–2025 | ADO Den Haag | 20 | (3) |
| 2025 | Sparta Rotterdam U21 | 11 | (1) |
| 2026– | Terrassa | 6 | (0) |
- * Club domestic league appearances and goals as of 15 May 2026

Dano Lourens (born 4 March 2004) is a Dutch professional footballer who plays as a forward for Spanish club Terrassa.

== Club career ==
Lourens began playing football in the youth academy of Zeelandia, before moving to the Jeugd Voetbal Opleiding Zeeland, where he was scouted by NAC Breda. He spent five years in NAC Breda's youth academy before returning to amateur side VV Kloetinge, where his father worked as a coach. He also made his senior debut there.

=== Sparta Rotterdam ===
In mid-2022, Lourens joined Sparta Rotterdam, where he mainly played for Jong Sparta Rotterdam in the Tweede Divisie. He made 51 appearances for Jong Sparta, scoring 16 goals.

On 13 May 2023, Lourens made his debut for Sparta Rotterdam in the Eredivisie against FC Volendam in a 2–1 defeat. He came on in the 94th minute as a substitute for Younes Namli. It remained his only appearance for Sparta's first team.

=== ADO Den Haag ===
In mid-2024, Lourens joined ADO Den Haag, competing in the Eerste Divisie. He made his debut in the opening match of the season against VVV-Venlo, coming on as a substitute for Daryl van Mieghem in the 80th minute of a 1–1 draw.

He scored his first professional goals on 1 November 2024 in a 4–0 victory over FC Eindhoven. He scored the opening goal from an assist by Steven van der Sloot and later added the third goal of the match.

== Career statistics ==
Appearances and goals by club, season and competition
| Club | Season | League | | | Cup | | Other | | Total | |
| Club | Season | Division | Apps | Goals | Apps | Goals | Apps | Goals | Apps | Goals |
|---|---|---|---|---|---|---|---|---|---|---|
| Sparta Rotterdam | 2022–23 | Eredivisie | 1 | 0 | 0 | 0 | 0 | 0 | 1 | 0 |
| Jong Sparta Rotterdam | 2022–23 | Tweede Divisie | 19 | 5 | – | | – | | 19 | 5 |
| Jong Sparta Rotterdam | 2023–24 | Tweede Divisie | 32 | 11 | – | | – | | 32 | 11 |
| ADO Den Haag | 2024–25 | Eerste Divisie | 19 | 2 | 1 | 0 | 0 | 0 | 20 | 2 |
| Career total | | | 71 | 18 | 1 | 0 | 0 | 0 | 72 | 18 |
