= Elias Mohammad =

Swedish footballer (born 2003)

Personal information
- Full name: Elias Mohammad
- Date of birth: 24 May 2003 (age 23)
- Place of birth: Stockholm, Sweden
- Positions: Forward; winger

Team information
- Current team: Falkenbergs FF
- Number: 10

Youth career
- Jarlabergs IF
- 2013–2022: Hammarby IF

Senior career*
Years	Team	Apps	(Gls)
2022–2024	Hammarby IF	0	(0)
2023–2024	→ Hammarby TFF	39	(7)
2024–2025	ADO Den Haag	10	(0)
2026–	Falkenbergs FF	29	(3)
- * Club domestic league appearances and goals as of 11 November 2026

Elias Mohammad (born 24 May 2003) is a Swedish-Afghan professional footballer who plays as an attacking medfielder and winger for Falkenbergs FF in Superettan. He previously represented Hammarby IF, Hammarby TFF and Dutch club ADO Den Haag.

== Club career ==
Mohammad was born in Stockholm and played youth football for Jarlabergs IF and Hammarby IF. Although he never appeared for Hammarby's first team, he played two matches in the UEFA Youth League against Rangers.

For the 2023 and 2024 seasons, he was loaned to Hammarby TFF, which competed in the Ettan, the third tier of Swedish football. He scored seven goals in 39 league appearances for the club.

In September 2024, Mohammad joined ADO Den Haag, competing in the Eerste Divisie. He made his debut on 13 September against FC Den Bosch in a 2–0 defeat, coming on at half-time as a substitute for Dano Lourens. In August 2025, Mohammad and ADO Den Haag mutually terminated his contract.

In December 2025, Mohammad signed a four-year contract with Falkenbergs FF ahead of the 2026 Superettan season and wears shirt number 10.

Mohammad is primarily an attacking winger but can also play as a forward. He has described his playing style as technical, creative and based on pace.

== Career statistics ==
As of 20 July 2026

Appearances and goals by club, season and competition
Club	Season	League	League		Cup		Other		Total	
Club	Season	League	Apps	Goals	Apps	Goals	Apps	Goals	Apps	Goals
→ Hammarby TFF	2023	Ettan	20	1	0	0	0	0	20	1
→ Hammarby TFF	2024	Ettan	19	6	0	0	0	0	19	6
ADO Den Haag	2024–25	Eerste Divisie	10	0	1	0	0	0	11	0
Falkenbergs FF	2026	Superettan	13	2	3	0	0	0	16	2
Career total			62	9	4	0	0	0	66	9
