= Henk Breitner =

Dutch footballer

Personal information
- Full name: George Hendrik Philip Breitner
- Date of birth: 3 April 1907
- Place of birth: The Hague, Netherlands
- Date of death: 13 April 1976 (aged 69)
- Position: Midfielder

Senior career*
Years	Team	Apps	(Gls)
1926–1934	ADO		
1934–1939	Hermes DVS		
1939–1950	ESDO		

International career
1930–1933	Netherlands	5	(0)
- * Club domestic league appearances and goals

Henk Breitner (3 April 1907 – 13 April 1976) was a Dutch footballer. He played in five matches for the Netherlands national football team from 1930 to 1933.
