= Wim Tap =

Dutch footballer and manager

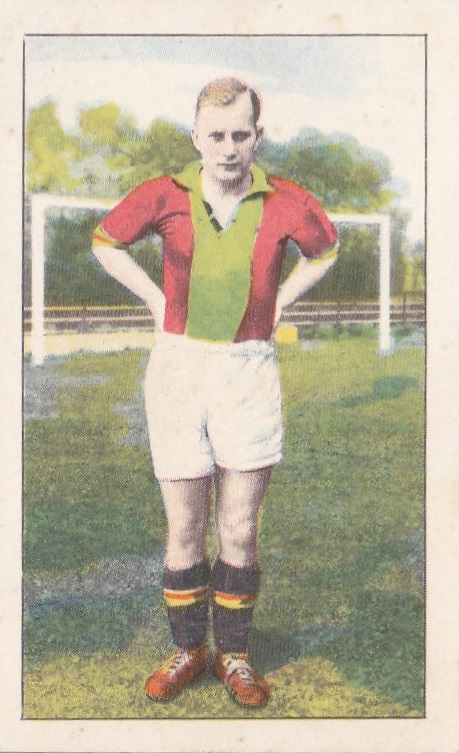

Personal information
- Date of birth: 3 October 1903
- Place of birth: The Hague, Netherlands
- Date of death: 24 September 1979 (aged 75)
- Place of death: The Hague, Netherlands
- Position: Striker

Senior career*
Years	Team	Apps	(Gls)
1920–1936	ADO Den Haag		

International career
1925–1931	Netherlands	33	(17)

Managerial career
- 1936–1946: ADO Den Haag
- * Club domestic league appearances and goals

Wim Tap (3 October 1903 – 24 September 1979) was a Dutch footballer who played club football for ADO Den Haag. He also earned 33 caps for the Netherlands national side between 1925 and 1931, scoring 17 goals. He was also part of the Netherlands squad at the 1928 Summer Olympics, but did not play in any matches.
