= Jesse Kilo =

Finnish footballer (born 2004)

Personal information
- Full name: Jesse Mikael Kilo
- Date of birth: 15 January 2004 (age 22)
- Place of birth: Finland
- Position: Midfielder

Team information
- Current team: Ilves
- Number: 28

Youth career
- 2012: Gnistan
- 2014: HJK
- 2015–2019: KäPa
- 2020–2023: Hamburger SV

Senior career*
Years	Team	Apps	(Gls)
2022–2025	Hamburger SV II	56	(1)
2025–	Ilves	34	(1)

International career^{‡}
2019	Finland U15	3	(1)
2019	Finland U16	4	(6)
2019	Finland U17	4	(0)
2021–2022	Finland U18	4	(1)
2022	Finland U19	6	(1)
- * Club domestic league appearances and goals as of 13 November 2026 ‡ National team caps and goals as of 3 November 2023

Jesse Mikael Kilo (born 15 January 2004) is a Finnish professional footballer who plays as a midfielder for Veikkausliiga club Ilves.

== Career ==
After spending five seasons with Hamburger SV organisation, Kilo returned to Finland and on 23 July 2025 he signed with Veikkausliiga club Ilves on a deal until the end of 2027.

== Personal life ==
His older brother Juho Kilo is also a professional footballer, and has also played for Käpa and Hamburger SV youth academy, as well as in Hamburger SV II.

== Career statistics ==
As of 13 November 2026

Appearances and goals by club, season and competition
Club	Season	League			Cups (Note: Includes Finnish Cup)		Europe		Total	
Club	Season	Division	Apps	Goals	Apps	Goals	Apps	Goals	Apps	Goals
Hamburger SV II	2022–23	Regionalliga Nord	4	0	–		–		4	0
Hamburger SV II	2023–24	Regionalliga Nord	19	1	–		–		19	1
Hamburger SV II	2024–25	Regionalliga Nord	33	0	–		–		33	0
Hamburger SV II	Total		56	1	–	–	–	–	56	1
Ilves	2025	Veikkausliiga	7	1	0	0	1 (Note: Appearance in UEFA Conference League)	0	8	1
Ilves	2026	Veikkausliiga	27	0	4	1	5	1	36	2
Ilves	Total		34	1	4	1	6	1	44	3
Career total			90	2	4	1	6	1	100	3
