= Daniël Rijaard =

Dutch Antilles footballer (born 1976)

Personal information
- Full name: Daniël Julio Henry Rijaard
- Date of birth: 16 November 1976 (age 49)
- Place of birth: Rotterdam, Netherlands
- Position: Defender

Team information
- Current team: SVV Scheveningen
- Number: 2

Senior career*
Years	Team	Apps	(Gls)
1995–2002	Excelsior Rotterdam	196	(9)
2002–2005	ADO Den Haag	93	(0)
2006–2006	Excelsior Rotterdam	11	(1)
2006–2008	ADO Den Haag	13	(0)
2008–	SVV Scheveningen		

International career^{‡}
2004	Netherlands Antilles	3	(0)
- * Club domestic league appearances and goals as of 4 February 2008 ‡ National team caps and goals as of 4 February 2008

Daniël Rijaard (born November 16, 1976) is a Dutch Antilles footballer who plays for SVV Scheveningen and Netherlands Antilles. He is a defender who plays as a fullback on the right side of the pitch.

== Club career ==
Rijaard's career began when he signed a professional contract with Excelsior Rotterdam, making his first first-team appearance in 1995, at the age of 18. He was a regular in the team immediately and became one of Excelsior's key players in the following years. In total he played seven straight seasons at the Rotterdam club before making a move towards Eredivisie participants ADO Den Haag. Again he was a regular member in the first team right from the start and played nearly all matches in the competition. In his third season at ADO Den Haag he found himself on the bench more often and at the end of 2005 he went back to Excelsior on loan. With this team he won the championship in the Eerste Divisie, which secured the team a place in the Eredivisie for 2006–07. After the season, he returned to ADO where he was no longer secure to be lined-up in the first team. When ADO promoted to the Eredivisie in the 2007-08 season, Rijaard did not receive a new contract. Therefore, he left ADO and became an amateur footballer at Scheveningen.

== International career ==
Rijaard made his debut for the Netherlands Antilles in a March 2004 World Cup qualifying match against Antigua and Barbuda.
