= Dick Groves =

English footballer

Personal information
- Date of birth: 1909 or 1910
- Position: Inside forward

Senior career*
Years	Team	Apps	(Gls)
- Bristol Rovers
- Southampton
- Plymouth Argyle
- Torquay United

Managerial career
- 1951: Sligo Rovers
- 1953: ADO Den Haag
- 1954: North Shore
- 1960: Hakoah Sydney
- * Club domestic league appearances and goals

Richard G. Groves (born 1909/1910) was an English professional football player and manager. He was also active in cricket and rugby.

== Playing career ==
Groves played an inside forward, for Bristol Rovers, Southampton, Plymouth Argyle and Torquay United.

== Coaching career ==
Groves coached Irish club Sligo Rovers in 1951, and Dutch team ADO Den Haag in 1953.

Whilst in the Netherlands he worked with the Royal Dutch Football Association for two years.

Groves also worked on the ground staff for Somerset County Cricket Club.

He emigrated to Australia in 1954, working for the National Fitness Council in Toowoomba. In May 1954 he became coach of North Shore in Sydney.

He also coached the Toowoomba Clydesdales rugby league team. He became coach of Hakoah Sydney for the 1960 season.
