= Joop Lankhaar =

Dutch footballer and manager

Joep Lankhaar
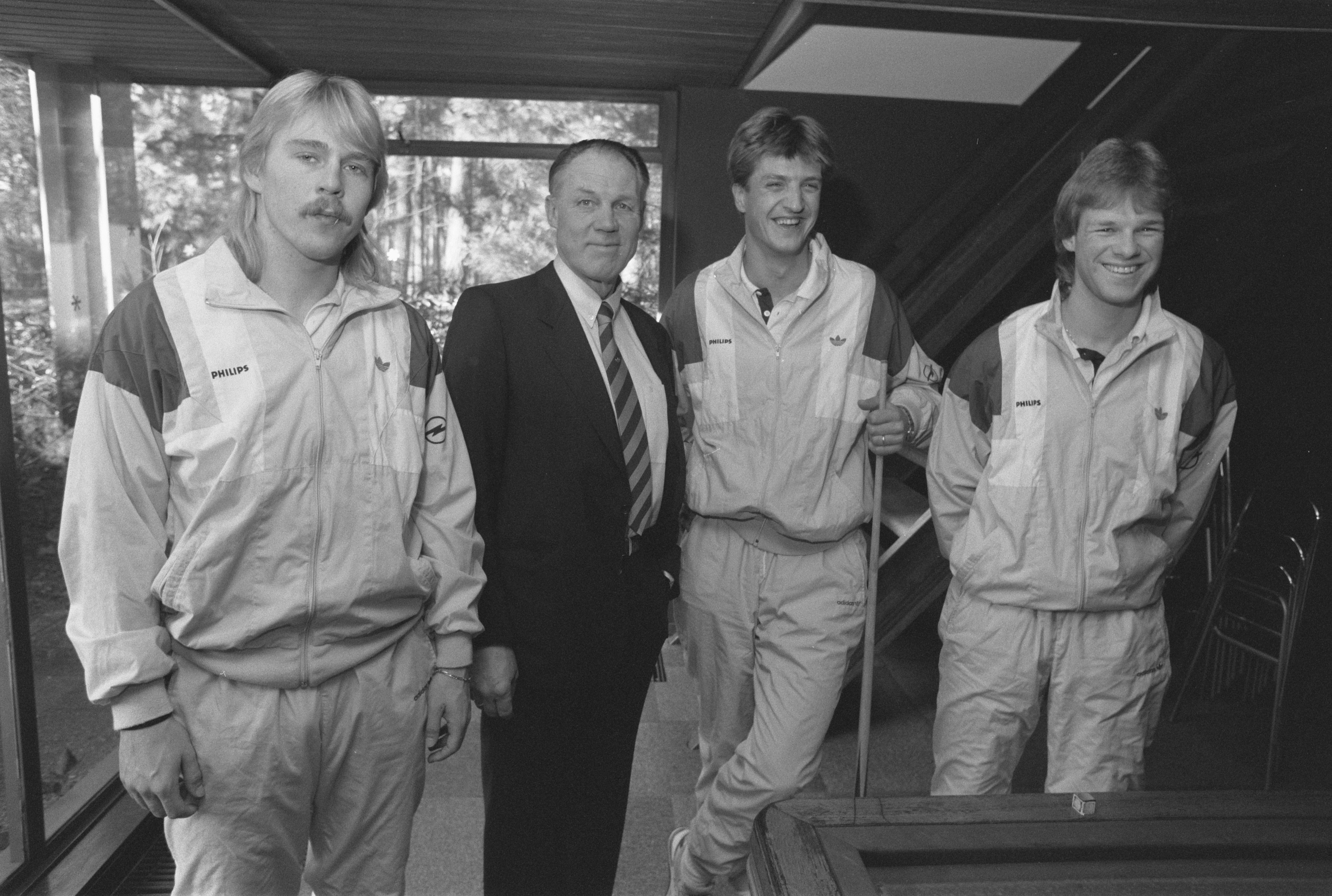
- Lankhaar (left) with the Netherlands national football team (1987)

Personal information
- Full name: Joep Lankhaar
- Date of birth: 12 September 1966 (age 60)
- Place of birth: Alphen aan den Rijn, Netherlands
- Position: Defender

Youth career
- ARC

Senior career*
Years	Team	Apps	(Gls)
1984–1988	FC Den Haag	94	(1)
1988–1993	Racing Mechelen	147	(4)
1993–1995	Lierse	26	(0)
1995–1999	Dordrecht'90	104	(3)
Total		518	(8)

International career
1987	Netherlands	1	(0)

Managerial career
- 2005: Dordrecht'90
- * Club domestic league appearances and goals

Joep Lankhaar (born 12 September 1966 in Alphen aan den Rijn) is a Dutch former footballer.

== Club career ==
Lankhaar played for FC Den Haag, who signed him from amateur club ARC, and Dordrecht'90 in the Netherlands as well as Racing Mechelen and Lierse in Belgium.

== International career ==
He made one appearance for the Netherlands national football team in the UEFA Euro 1988 qualifying campaign in a 3-0 win over Greece on 16 December 1987 in Rhodes.
