= Finn de Bruin =

Dutch footballer (born 2004)

Personal information
- Full name: Finn de Bruin
- Date of birth: 5 April 2004 (age 22)
- Place of birth: Zoetermeer, Netherlands
- Position: Midfielder

Team information
- Current team: ADO Den Haag
- Number: 34

Youth career
- –2021: SV Nootdorp
- 2021–2022: Sparta Rotterdam
- 2022–2023: ADO Den Haag

Senior career*
Years	Team	Apps	(Gls)
2023–	ADO Den Haag	47	(1)
- * Club domestic league appearances and goals as of 12 September 2026

Finn de Bruin (born 5 April 2004) is a Dutch professional footballer who plays as a midfielder for Eredivisie club ADO Den Haag.

== Club career ==
=== Youth career ===
De Bruin played in the youth academy of SV Nootdorp until 2021, progressing through all youth levels at the club. After a trial with the under-18 team of Sparta Rotterdam, he was offered a youth contract and spent one season in the youth academy of the Rotterdam club.

=== ADO Den Haag ===
On 1 July 2022, de Bruin joined ADO Den Haag from the youth academy of Sparta Rotterdam. He initially played for the club's under-21 side before attracting the attention of head coach Darije Kalezic during the 2023–24 season.

De Bruin made his first-team debut against his former club Sparta Rotterdam in the second round of the KNVB Cup. He came on in the 86th minute as a substitute for Calvin Gustina. ADO Den Haag won the match 2–0 with goals from Daryl van Mieghem and Joel Ideho.

On 16 September 2024, de Bruin scored his first professional goal in a 2–2 draw against Jong PSV.

== Career statistics ==
As of match played 27 October 2026

Appearances and goals by club, season and competition
Club	Season	League			Cup		Europe		Other		Total	
Club	Season	Division	Apps	Goals	Apps	Goals	Apps	Goals	Apps	Goals	Apps	Goals
ADO Den Haag	2023–24	Eerste Divisie	8	0	1	0	—		0	0	9	0
ADO Den Haag	2024–25	Eerste Divisie	21	1	1	0	—		0	0	22	1
ADO Den Haag	2025–26	Eerste Divisie	14	0	1	0	—		—		15	0
ADO Den Haag	2026–27	Eredivisie	4	0	1	0	—		—		5	0
Career total			47	1	4	0	0	0	0	0	51	1
