= Herman Choufoer =

Dutch footballer

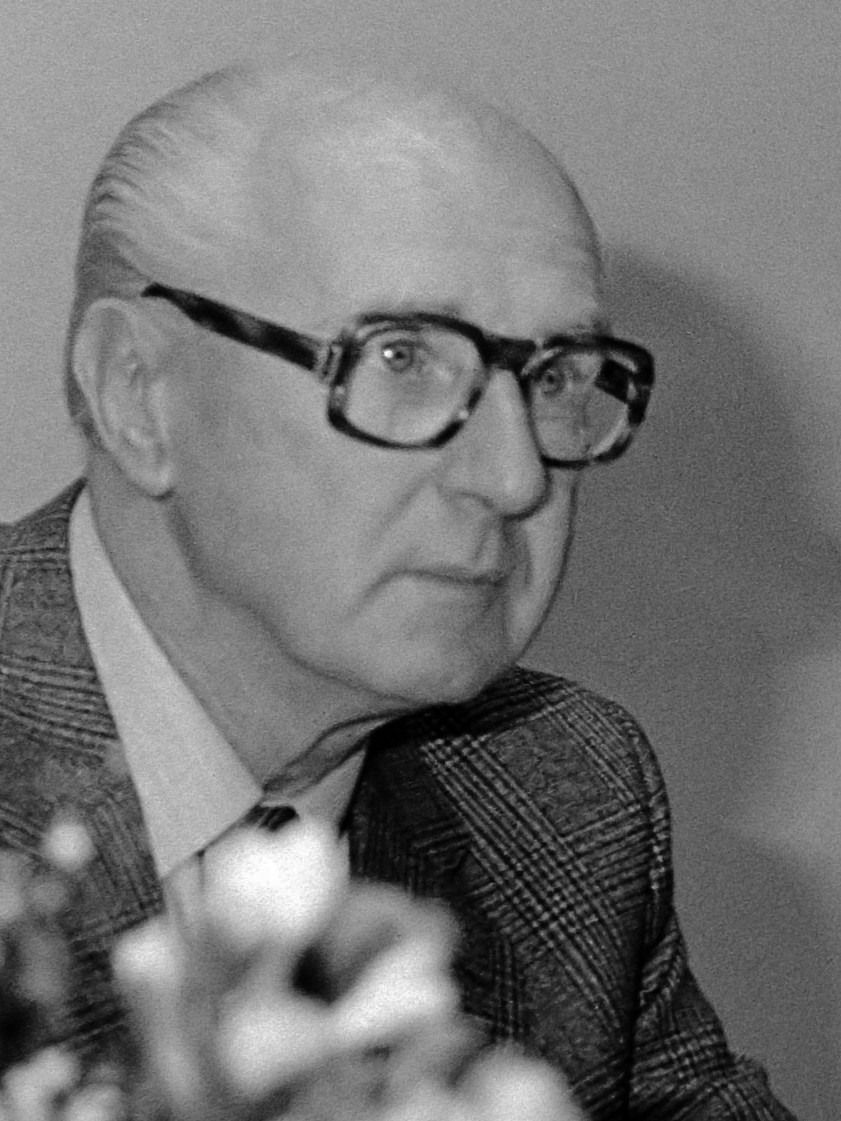
- Choufoer in 1981

Personal information
- Date of birth: 6 May 1916
- Place of birth: The Hague, Netherlands
- Date of death: 1 May 2001 (aged 84)
- Place of death: Rijswijk, Netherlands
- Position: Defender

Senior career*
| Years | Team | Apps | (Gls) |
| 1934–1943 | ADO | | |

International career
| 1940 | Netherlands | 1 | (0) |
- * Club domestic league appearances and goals

Herman Choufoer (6 May 1916 – 1 May 2001) was a Dutch footballer. He played in one match for the Netherlands national football team in 1940.

Choufoer played for ADO, also during World War II when the club was regarded as collaborating with the German occupiers and won their only two league titles.

Choufour later was chairman of ADO and worked for the Dutch FA. He died in Rijswijk in 2001.
