= Caleb Kramer =

Kenyan footballer

Personal information
- Full name: Caleb Obida Kramer
- Date of birth: 1 August 2006 (age 20)
- Place of birth: Nairobi, Kenya
- Position: Goalkeeper

Team information
- Current team: ADO Den Haag
- Number: 29

Youth career
- 2011–2017: VFC
- 2019–2025: ADO Den Haag

Senior career*
Years	Team	Apps	(Gls)
2025–	ADO Den Haag	0	(0)

International career^{‡}
2026–	Kenya	2	(0)
- * Club domestic league appearances and goals as of 15:19, 8 June 2026 (UTC) ‡ National team caps and goals as of 15:19, 8 June 2026 (UTC)

Caleb Obida Kramer (born 1 August 2006) is a Kenyan footballer who plays as a goalkeeper for Eredivisie club ADO Den Haag and the Kenya national team.

== Club career ==
Kramer joined the youth academy of ADO Den Haag at the age of thirteen in 2019, spending five years progressing through the club's age groups. He was promoted to the first-team squad ahead of the 2024–25 season, serving as backup goalkeeper in the Eerste Divisie.

== International career ==
Kramer holds dual Kenyan and Dutch citizenship, through being born in Kenya and raised in the Netherlands. In April 2025, he received his first international call-up, joining the Kenya under-23 squad for a training camp in Kenya — his first involvement with any Kenyan national team setup. He was also part of the preliminary squad for the U20 AFCON but did not make the final travelling party.

In May 2026, Kramer received his first senior call-up to the Harambee Stars, named in the squad by head coach Engin Fırat as one of five uncapped players included ahead of upcoming 2027 AFCON qualifying fixtures.
