= Gerard Tap =

Dutch footballer

Personal information
- Date of birth: 27 January 1900
- Place of birth: Den Haag, Netherlands
- Date of death: 1 January 1980 (aged 79)

International career
Years	Team	Apps	(Gls)
1928	Netherlands	1	(0)

Gerard Tap (27 January 1900 – 1 January 1980) was a Dutch footballer. He played in one match for the Netherlands national football team in 1928.
