= Luka Reischl =

Austrian footballer

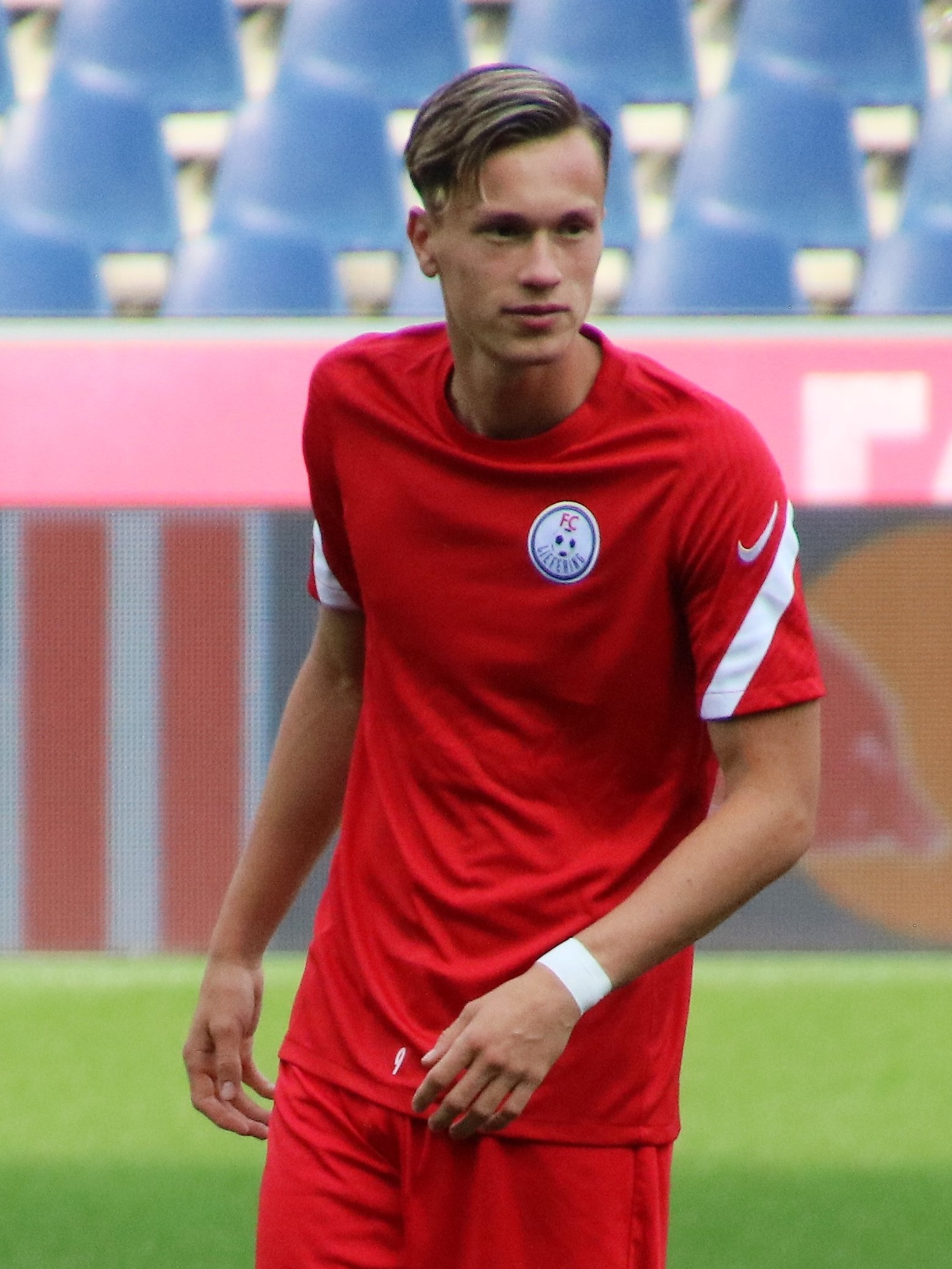
- Luka Reischl

Personal information
- Date of birth: 10 February 2004 (age 22)
- Place of birth: Schwarzach im Pongau, Austria
- Height: 6 ft 0 in (1.84 m)
- Position: Forward

Team information
- Current team: ADO Den Haag
- Number: 19

Youth career
- 2008–2012: UFC Altenmarkt
- 2012–2014: UFC Radstadt
- 2014–2015: SK Bischofshofen
- 2015–2020: Red Bull Salzburg

Senior career*
Years	Team	Apps	(Gls)
2020–2025	FC Liefering	103	(20)
2025	→ ADO Den Haag (loan)	8	(5)
2025–	ADO Den Haag	36	(10)

International career
2018–2019	Austria U15	10	(4)
2018–2019	Austria U16	7	(3)
2019–2020	Austria U17	1	(1)
2021–2022	Austria U18	9	(3)
2022	Austria U19	3	(1)
2024–2025	Austria U21	6	(1)
- * Club domestic league appearances and goals as of 12 September 2026

Luka Reischl (born 10 February 2004) is an Austrian professional footballer who plays as a forward for Eredivisie club ADO Den Haag.

== Club career ==
Reischl made his professional debut for Austrian Second League side FC Liefering on 25 September 2020 against Wacker Innsbruck. He came on as an 89th-minute substitute for Maurits Kjaergaard as Liefering won 2–0. He scored his first professional goal on 20 November 2020 against Kapfenberger SV as Liefering won 6:1.

On 14 January 2025, Reischl moved on loan to ADO Den Haag in the Netherlands, with an option to buy.

== Career statistics ==
As of match played 12 September 2026

Appearances and goals by club, season and competition
Club	Season	League			Cup		Other		Total	
Club	Season	Division	Apps	Goals	Apps	Goals	Apps	Goals	Apps	Goals
FC Liefering	2020–21	Austrian Second League	22	2	—		—		22	2
FC Liefering	2021–22	Austrian Second League	25	3	—		—		25	3
FC Liefering	2022–23	Austrian Second League	22	2	—		—		22	2
FC Liefering	2023–24	Austrian Second League	19	7	—		—		19	7
FC Liefering	2024–25	Austrian Second League	15	6	—		—		15	6
FC Liefering	Total		103	20	—		—		103	20
ADO Den Haag (loan)	2024–25	Eerste Divisie	8	5	—		2 (Note: Appearances in promotion play-offs)	0	10	5
ADO Den Haag	2025–26	Eerste Divisie	34	10	1	1	—		35	11
ADO Den Haag	2026–27	Eredivisie	2	0	0	0	—		2	0
ADO Den Haag	Total		36	10	1	1	—		37	11
Career total			147	35	1	1	2	0	150	36

== Honours ==
ADO Den Haag

- Eerste Divisie: 2025–26
