= Kees Quax =

Dutch footballer

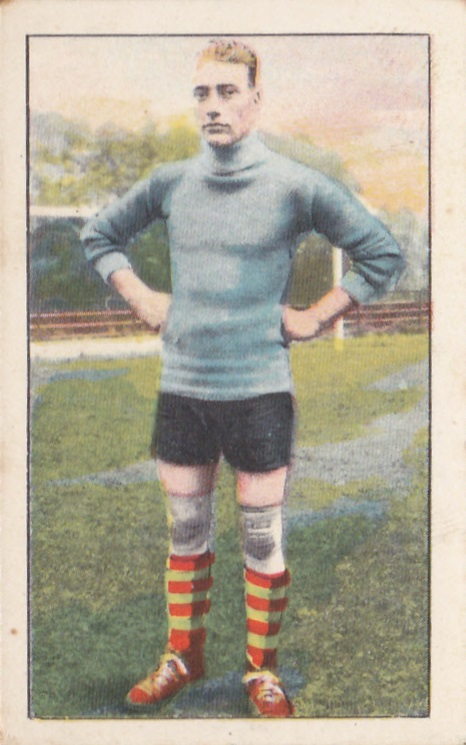

Personal information
- Date of birth: 14 July 1905
- Place of birth: The Hague, Netherlands
- Date of death: 18 March 1973 (aged 67)

International career
Years	Team	Apps	(Gls)
1926	Netherlands	3	(0)

Kees Quax (14 July 1905 – 18 March 1973) was a Dutch footballer. He played in three matches for the Netherlands national football team in 1926.
