= Juho Kilo =

Finnish footballer (born 2002)

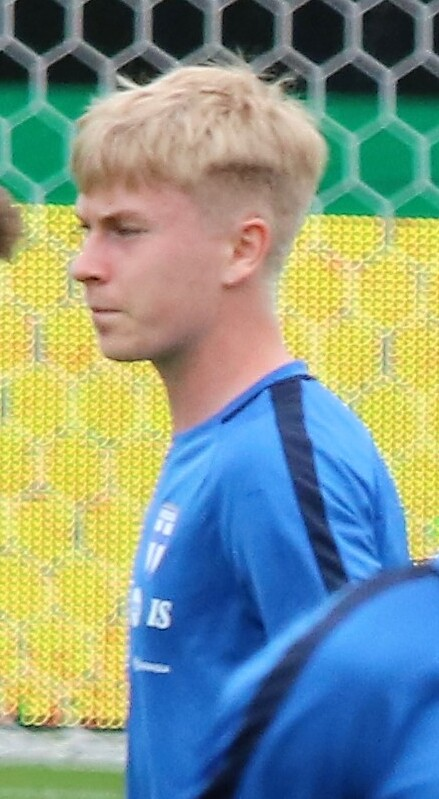
- Kilo with Finland U21 in 2022

Personal information
- Full name: Juho Teemu Kristian Kilo
- Date of birth: 23 June 2002 (age 24)
- Place of birth: Finland
- Height: 1.78 m (5 ft 10 in)
- Position: Midfielder

Team information
- Current team: ADO Den Haag
- Number: 25

Youth career
- –2018: KäPa
- 2018–2020: Hamburger SV

Senior career*
Years	Team	Apps	(Gls)
2020–2023	Hamburger SV II	64	(6)
2024	Haka	18	(3)
2024–	ADO Den Haag	85	(9)

International career
- Finland U16
2018–2019	Finland U17	9	(0)
2019	Finland U18	2	(0)
2021–2023	Finland U21	9	(0)
- * Club domestic league appearances and goals as of 18 November 2026

Juho Teemu Kristian Kilo (born 23 June 2002) is a Finnish professional footballer who plays as a midfielder for Eredivisie club ADO Den Haag.

== Early career ==
Kilo is a product of Käpylän Pallo (KäPa) youth program. He played with KäPa until August 2018, when he joined the Hamburger SV youth academy for a €100,000 transfer fee.

== Club career ==
=== Hamburger SV II ===
Kilo made his senior debut with Hamburger SV II in 2020, playing in Regionalliga Nord. He played with HSV reserve team two full seasons until the summer 2023, when his contract expired with the club, and he was not offered a contract with the first team.

=== Haka ===
Kilo was without club for the rest of 2023, and on 6 February 2024, he returned to Finland and signed a one-year deal with a Veikkausliiga club FC Haka. He made 28 appearances and scored three goals for the club in all competitions combined, before leaving in the beginning of August.

=== ADO Den Haag ===
On 5 August 2024, Kilo signed a contract with Eerste Divisie club ADO Den Haag in the Netherlands for two seasons, with an option for a third, for an undisclosed fee.

He scored his first goals for the club on 4 October, by a brace in a 5–1 away win against TOP Oss, becoming the first Finnish player since Joonas Kolkka in 2006 to score for ADO Den Haag. In July 2025, Kilo signed a three-year contract extension.

On 17 March 2026, after a win against Jong Utrecht, ADO won a promotion to Eredivisie, six matches prior to the regular season ending.

== Personal life ==
His younger brother Jesse is also a professional footballer.

== Career statistics ==
As of 18 November 2026

Appearances and goals by club, season and competition
Club	Season	League			National cup (Note: Includes Suomen Cup and KNVB Cup)		League cup (Note: Includes Finnish League Cup)		Other		Total	
Club	Season	Division	Apps	Goals	Apps	Goals	Apps	Goals	Apps	Goals	Apps	Goals
Hamburger SV II	2020–21	Regionalliga Nord	1	0	—		—		—		1	0
Hamburger SV II	2021–22	Regionalliga Nord	28	4	—		—		—		28	4
Hamburger SV II	2022–23	Regionalliga Nord	35	2	—		—		—		35	2
Hamburger SV II	Total		64	6	—		—		—		64	6
Haka	2024	Veikkausliiga	18	3	5	0	5	0	—		28	3
ADO Den Haag	2024–25	Eerste Divisie	37	3	0	0	—		2 (Note: Appearances in Eredivisie promotion play-offs)	0	39	3
ADO Den Haag	2025–26	Eerste Divisie	36	4	2	0	—		—		38	4
ADO Den Haag	2026–27	Eredivisie	12	2	1	0	—		—		13	2
ADO Den Haag	Total		85	9	3	0	—		2	0	90	9
Career total			167	18	8	0	5	0	2	0	182	18

== Honours ==
ADO Den Haag

- Eerste Divisie: 2025–26
