= Milan Hokke =

Dutch association football player (born 2003)

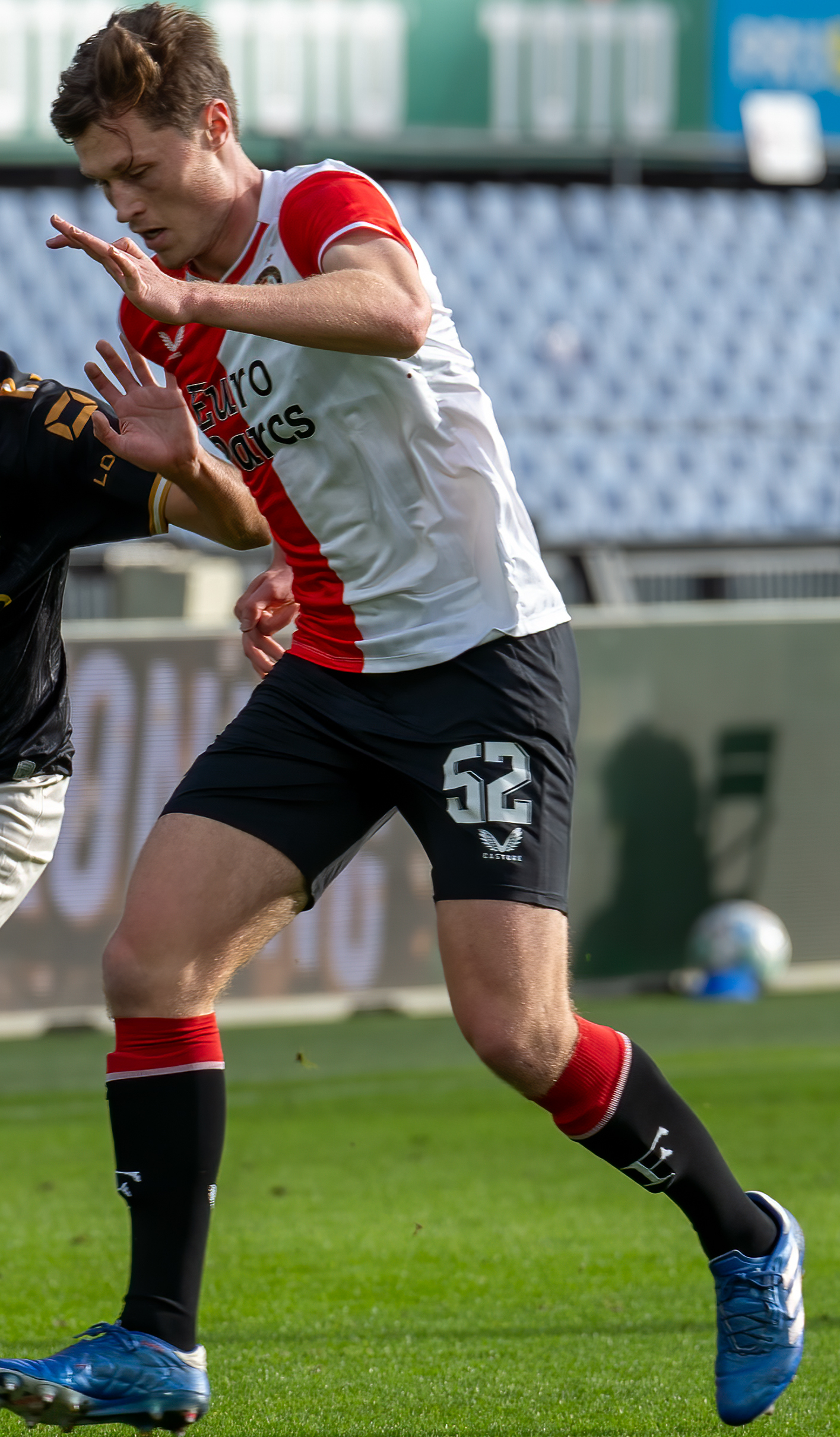
- Hokke playing for Feyenoord in 2023

Personal information
- Date of birth: 11 October 2003 (age 23)
- Place of birth: Vlaardingen
- Height: 1.90 m (6 ft 3 in)
- Position: Defender

Team information
- Current team: ADO Den Haag
- Number: 15

Youth career
- VDL
- 2011–2024: Feyenoord

Senior career*
Years	Team	Apps	(Gls)
2024–2025	Feyenoord	0	(0)
2024–2025	→ ADO Den Haag (loan)	6	(0)
2025–	ADO Den Haag	35	(1)
- * Club domestic league appearances and goals as of 24 October 2026

Milan Hokke (born 11 October 2003) is a Dutch professional footballer who plays as a defender for Eredivisie side ADO Den Haag.

== Career ==
Hokke was born in Vlaardingen, but grew up in Maassluis and joined the youth set-up at Feyenoord from local club VDL at the age of seven, in 2011. He spent 14 years progressing through the age-groups at Varkenoord, prior to signing a three year-contract in 2023. He played 41 official matches for Feyenoord U21s, in which he scored five times and won both the U21 cup and championship, during the 2023–24 season.

Hokke agreed to join ADO Den Haag in the summer of 2024. The agreement between the two clubs was for a season-long loan with the option to make the deal permanent. He made his professional debut on 30 August 2024, playing at home for ADO Den Haag against Excelsior in the Eerste Divisie. On 2 July 2025, it was announced that he signed a contract extension to keep him at the club until the end of the 2026–27 season.

== Career statistics ==
As of match played 24 October 2026

Appearances and goals by club, season and competition
Club	Season	League			Cup		Europe		Other		Total	
Club	Season	Division	Apps	Goals	Apps	Goals	Apps	Goals	Apps	Goals	Apps	Goals
Feyenoord	2024–25	Eredivisie	0	0	0	0	0	0	0	0	0	0
ADO Den Haag (loan)	2024–25	Eerste Divisie	6	0	—		—		1 (Note: Appearance in promotion play-offs)	0	7	0
ADO Den Haag	2025–26	Eerste Divisie	26	1	0	0	—		—		26	1
ADO Den Haag	2026–27	Eredivisie	9	0	1	0	—		—		10	0
ADO Den Haag	Total		35	1	1	0	—		—		36	1
Career total			41	1	1	0	0	0	1	0	43	1

== Honours ==
ADO Den Haag

- Eerste Divisie: 2025–26
