= Piet de Zoete =

Dutch footballer (1943–2023)

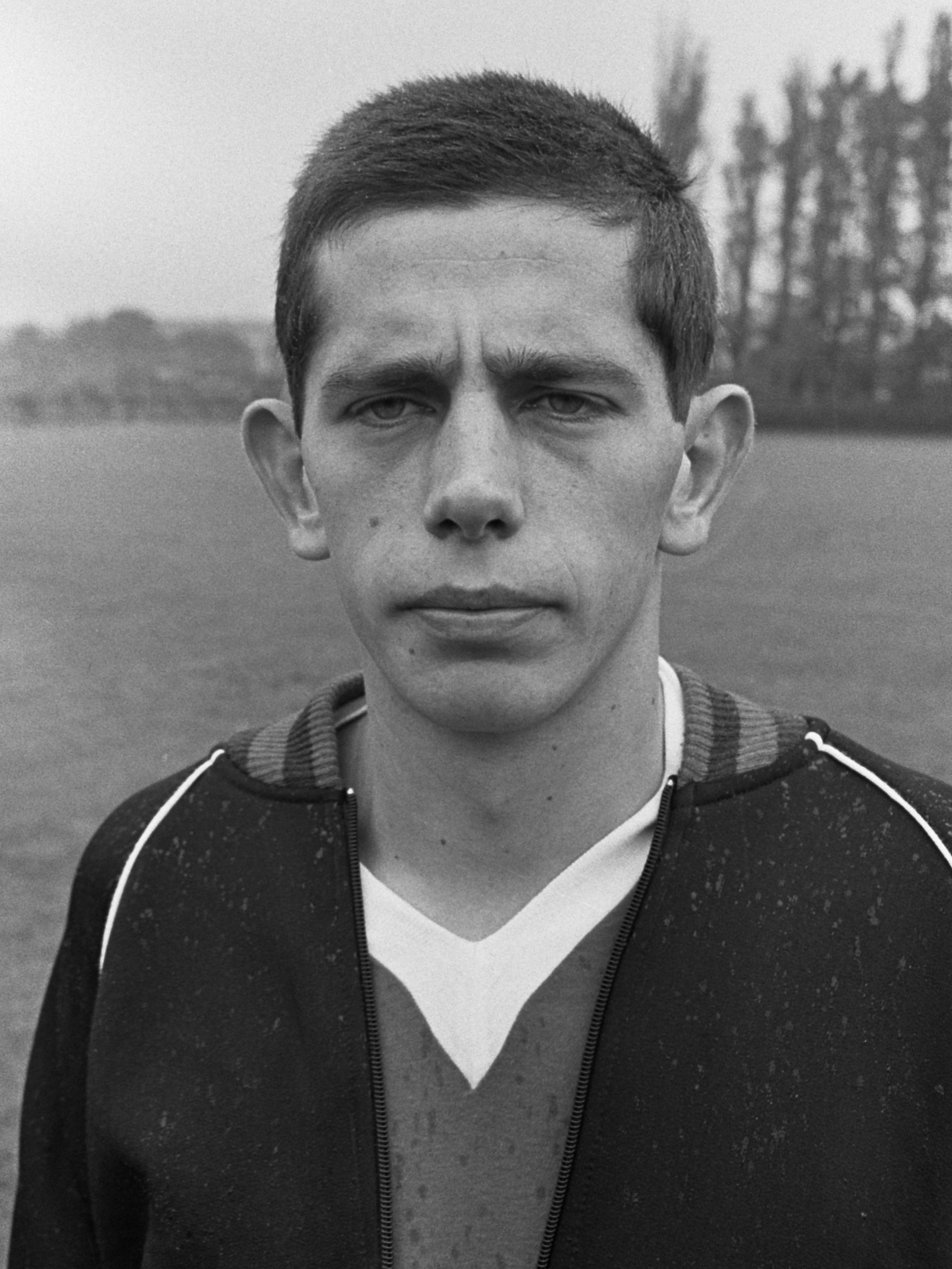
- De Zoete in 1966

Personal information
- Full name: Pieter de Zoete
- Date of birth: 6 November 1943
- Place of birth: The Hague, German-occupied Netherlands
- Date of death: 28 May 2023 (aged 79)
- Position: Midfielder

Senior career*
Years	Team	Apps	(Gls)
1962–1974	Den Haag		

International career
1966–1967	Netherlands	3	(0)

Managerial career
- 2001: Den Haag
- * Club domestic league appearances and goals

Pieter de Zoete (6 November 1943 – 28 May 2023) was a Dutch footballer who played as a midfielder. He made three appearances for the Netherlands national team from 1966 to 1967.

De Zoete died on 28 May 2023, at the age of 79.
