= Jesse Bal =

Dutch forward (born 2006)

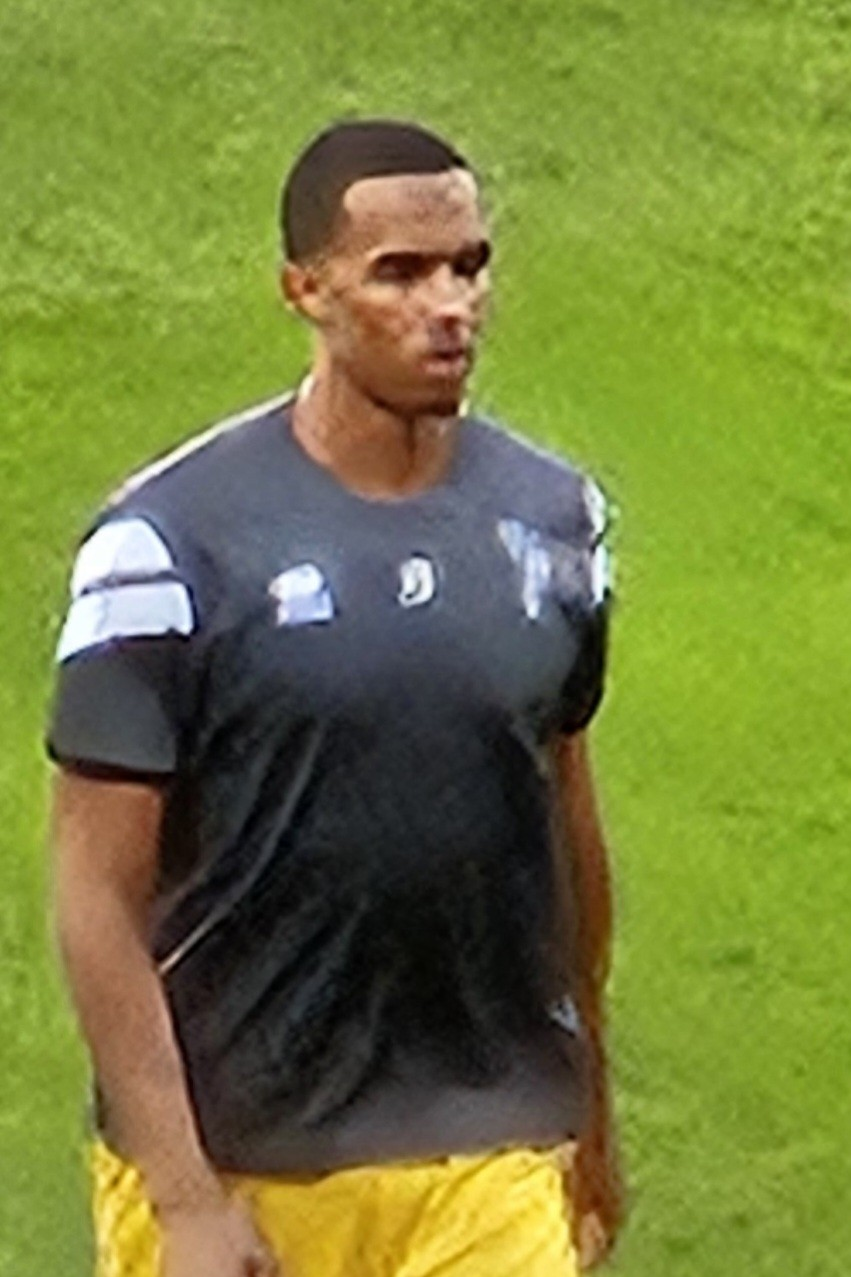

Personal information
- Full name: Jesse Philip Bal
- Date of birth: 1 October 2006 (age 20)
- Place of birth: Kampala, Uganda
- Height: 1.96 m (6 ft 5 in)
- Position: Forward

Team information
- Current team: ADO Den Haag
- Number: 23

Youth career
- –2014: Quick
- 2014–2025: Jong Sparta
- 2025: Parma (loan)

Senior career*
Years	Team	Apps	(Gls)
2022–2025	Jong Sparta	36	(2)
2023	Sparta Rotterdam	2	(0)
2025–	ADO Den Haag	40	(9)

International career^{‡}
2022	Netherlands U16	4	(3)
2022–2023	Netherlands U17	8	(1)
2023–2024	Netherlands U18	5	(1)
- * Club domestic league appearances and goals as of 24 October 2026 ‡ National team caps and goals as of 25 March 2024

Jesse Philip Bal (born 1 October 2006) is a professional footballer who plays as a forward for Eredivisie club ADO Den Haag. Born in Uganda, he is a former Netherlands youth international.

== Early career ==
Bal was born in Kampala, Uganda, and developed in the youth academy of Sparta Rotterdam. He signed his first professional contract on 29 May 2022. He started training with the first team on 30 November 2022. Bal joined Parma youth academy on loan on 3 February 2025.

== Club career ==
Bal joined Eerste Divisie club ADO Den Haag on 22 August 2025, on a two-year contract valid until 2027. He made his debut here on 29 August 2025 against Helmond Sport.

== Career statistics ==
As of match played 24 October 2026

Appearances and goals by club, season and competition
Club	Season	League			National cup		Other		Total	
Club	Season	Division	Apps	Goals	Apps	Goals	Apps	Goals	Apps	Goals
Jong Sparta	2022–23	Eerste Divisie	3	0	—		—		3	0
Jong Sparta	2023–24	Eerste Divisie	18	2	—		—		18	2
Jong Sparta	2024–25	Tweede Divisie	15	2	—		—		15	2
Jong Sparta	Total		36	2	—		—		36	2
Sparta Rotterdam	2023–24	Eredivisie	2	0	1	0	0	0	3	0
ADO Den Haag	2025–26	Eerste Divisie	31	8	1	0	—		32	8
ADO Den Haag	2026–27	Eredivisie	9	1	1	0	—		10	1
ADO Den Haag	Total		40	9	2	0	—		42	9
Career total			78	11	3	0	0	0	81	11

== Honours ==
ADO Den Haag

- Eerste Divisie: 2025–26
