= Matteo Waem =

Belgian footballer (born 2000)

Personal information
- Date of birth: 21 June 2000 (age 26)
- Place of birth: Merksem, Belgium
- Height: 1.89 m (6 ft 2 in)
- Position: Centre-back

Team information
- Current team: ADO Den Haag
- Number: 4

Youth career
- 2005–2006: Seja
- 2006–2016: Antwerp
- 2016–2017: Westerlo
- 2017–2020: Antwerp

Senior career*
Years	Team	Apps	(Gls)
2020–2023	MVV	87	(1)
2023–	ADO Den Haag	113	(9)
- * Club domestic league appearances and goals as of 24 October 2026

Matteo Waem (born 21 June 2000) is a Belgian professional footballer who plays as a centre-back for Eredivisie club ADO Den Haag.

== Career ==
=== Early years ===
Matteo Waem, who is of Belgian and Italian parentage, grew up in Merksem, a suburb of Antwerp. He took his first steps in football at the age of five at Seja, a regional football club. At the age of six he joined the Royal Antwerp academy, where he played until 2020. During this period, he also had a short stint at Westerlo for a year before resuming his career at Antwerp. During the 2019–20 season, he was on a trial practice at EFL Championship club Birmingham City and succeeded in convincing them to a transfer. Due to external factors, however, the deal fell through.

=== MVV ===
In June 2020, Waem signed for Dutch club MVV. He made his professional debut on 5 September 2020 in a 7–1 Eerste Divisie home loss to Cambuur, replacing Koen Kostons in the 84th minute.

Waem was appointed team captain of MVV ahead of the 2022–23 season. He scored his first professional goal on 5 February 2023, opening the score in the derby against Roda JC, which MVV lost 2–1.

=== ADO Den Haag ===
On 13 July 2023, ADO Den Haag announced the signing of Waem on a three-year contract.

== Personal life ==
Waem has described his younger brother Andreas as his main inspiration. His brother has autism, something Waem has mentioned as the reason for him studying psychology next to his career as a professional footballer.

== Career statistics ==
As of match played 27 October 2026

Appearances and goals by club, season and competition
Club	Season	League			KNVB Cup		Other		Total	
Club	Season	Division	Apps	Goals	Apps	Goals	Apps	Goals	Apps	Goals
MVV	2020–21	Eerste Divisie	19	0	0	0	—		19	0
MVV	2021–22	Eerste Divisie	34	0	2	0	—		36	0
MVV	2022–23	Eerste Divisie	34	1	1	0	2 (Note: Appearances in Eredivisie promotion/relegation playoffs)	0	37	1
MVV	Total		87	1	3	0	2	0	92	1
ADO Den Haag	2023–24	Eerste Divisie	35	3	4	0	4	0	43	3
ADO Den Haag	2024–25	Eerste Divisie	32	3	1	0	2	0	35	3
ADO Den Haag	2025–26	Eerste Divisie	37	3	1	0	—		38	3
ADO Den Haag	2026–27	Eredivisie	9	0	1	0	—		10	0
ADO Den Haag	Total		113	9	7	0	6	0	126	9
Career total			199	10	10	0	8	0	217	10

== Honours ==
ADO Den Haag

- Eerste Divisie: 2025–26
