= Carol Schuurman =

Dutch footballer

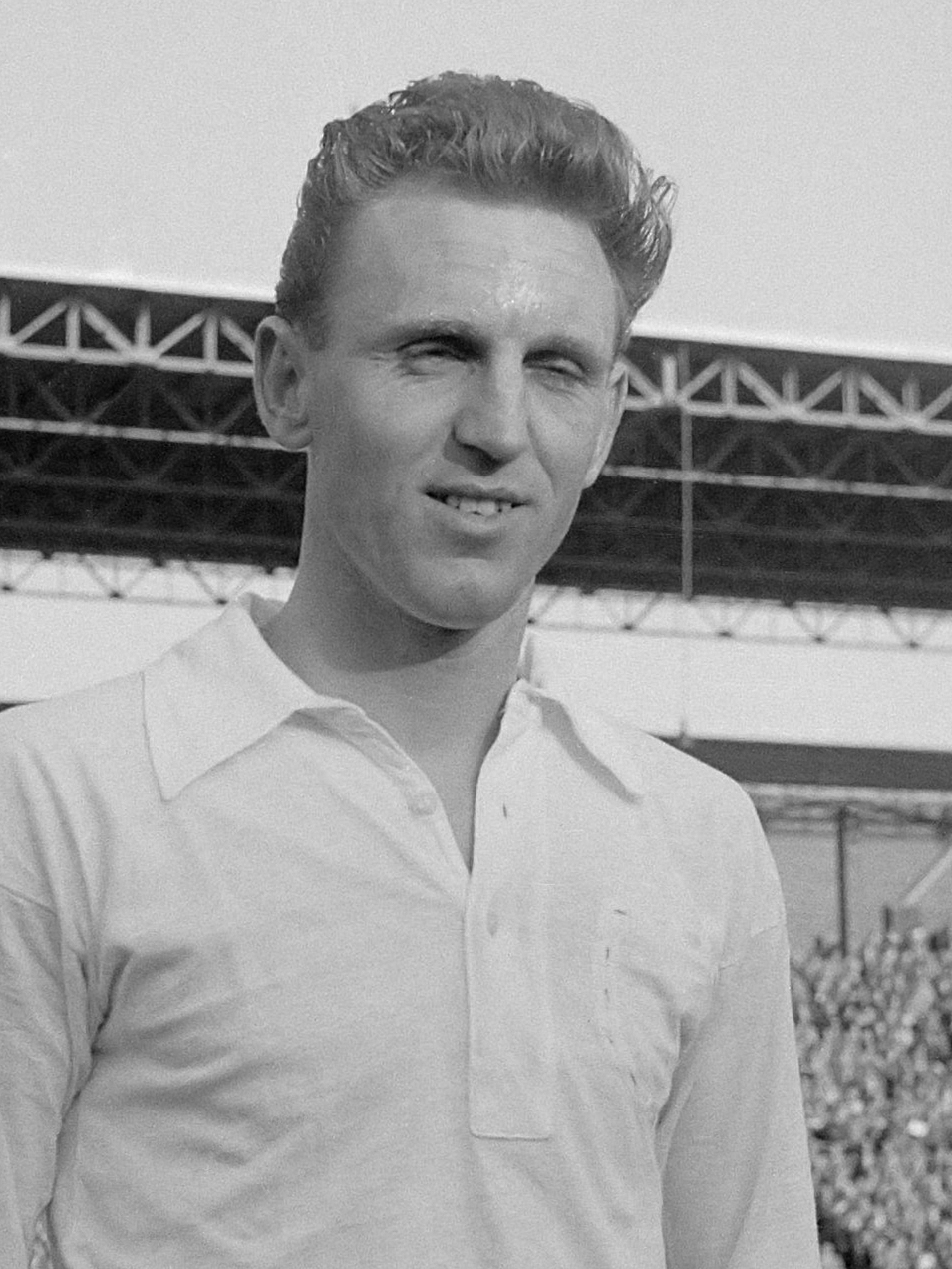
- Schuurman in 1957

Personal information
- Date of birth: 17 August 1934
- Date of death: 3 April 2009 (aged 74)

International career
| Years | Team | Apps | (Gls) |
| 1958–1961 | Netherlands | 4 | (0) |

Carol Schuurman (17 August 1934 – 3 April 2009) was a Dutch footballer. He played in four matches for the Netherlands national football team from 1958 to 1961.
