= Daryl van Mieghem =

Dutch footballer (born 1989)

Personal information
- Date of birth: 5 December 1989 (age 36)
- Place of birth: Amsterdam, Netherlands
- Height: 1.75 m (5 ft 9 in)
- Position: Right winger

Team information
- Current team: ADO Den Haag
- Number: 7

Youth career
- AFC
- Utrecht
- AFC

Senior career*
Years	Team	Apps	(Gls)
2008–2011	AFC		
2011–2013	Heracles Almelo	7	(0)
2013–2014	Telstar	29	(8)
2014–2016	Excelsior	54	(5)
2016–2018	Heracles Almelo	9	(2)
2017–2018	→ De Graafschap (loan)	49	(19)
2018–2021	De Graafschap	89	(19)
2021–2023	Volendam	69	(20)
2023–	ADO Den Haag	109	(25)
- * Club domestic league appearances and goals as of 24 October 2026

Daryl van Mieghem (born 5 December 1989) is a Dutch professional footballer who plays as a right winger for Eredivisie club ADO Den Haag.

Van Mieghem started his career with lower league club AFC. After winning promotion to the Topklasse with the club, he moved to Eredivisie club Heracles Almelo, where he failed to break through. Spells with Telstar and Excelsior followed, before he returned to Heracles. He was subsequently sent on two loan spells with De Graafschap, before signing a permanent deal with the club in 2018. In total, he spent more than four years at De Graafschap before joining FC Volendam in 2021.

== Club career ==
=== AFC ===
Van Mieghem was born in Amsterdam. He started his youth career with AFC, and went on two trials with Ajax but failed admission to their famed youth academy. Instead, he had a stint with Utrecht before returning to AFC in his final years of youth football. At age 19, he joined the first team, and in his second season he won the Hoofdklasse – Sunday A title and won promotion to the Topklasse with AFC. After making 21 appearances and six goals in his first season at that level, he attracted interest from multiple professional clubs.

=== Heracles Almelo ===
After trials with Bundesliga club Werder Bremen and Eredivisie club Heracles Almelo, he eventually signed a two-year contract with the latter on 14 July 2011. He made his Eredivisie debut on 22 January 2012 as a substitute for Marko Vejinović in a 2–1 away loss to Groningen.

=== Telstar ===
Having mostly appeared as a substitute during his two seasons at Heracles, Van Mieghem signed a one-year contract with Eerste Divisie club Telstar on 3 July 2013. Upon signing, he stated that he "just wanted playing time" and that this was possible with Telstar. On 4 October 2013, he scored his first goal for Telstar in a 4–3 loss to Dordrecht. He grew into a starter under head coach Marcel Keizer and had a strong season with 8 goals and multiple assists.

=== Excelsior ===
Van Mieghem was signed by Excelsior on 24 April 2014, after impressing during his season with Telstar. He penned a two-year deal with the club from Kralingen. He made his debut for the club on 9 August as he was in the starting lineup in a 1–1 draw against NAC Breda. He was substituted for Lars Hutten in the 76th minute.

During his two seasons with Excelsior, Van Mieghem made 59 appearances in which he scored 8 goals and made 7 assists.

=== Return to Heracles ===
In March 2016, it was announced that Van Mieghem would return to Heracles Almelo on a two-year contract beginning 1 July 2016. On 4 August 2021, he made his debut for the club – as well as his European debut – as a second-half substitute in a 0–0 away draw against Primeira Liga club Arouca in third qualifying round of the 2016–17 UEFA Europa League.

A few days later, he made his league debut on the first matchday in a 1–1 away draw against Roda JC Kerkrade, coming on as a substitute in the 79th minute for Brahim Darri. Mainly a substitute during his first games, Van Mieghem made his first start on 18 September in a 2–0 home loss to Ajax. He failed to impress during his second stint with Heracles, and struggled to win a permanent starting spot on the wing with Darri, Jaroslav Navrátil and Brandley Kuwas being the preferred options by manager John Stegeman. On 18 December, he scored his first goal in a 3–0 win over PEC Zwolle, after coming on as a substitute for an injured Darri in the first half.

=== De Graafschap ===
Van Mieghem made 12 total appearances for Heracles, in which he scored two goals, before he was sent on loan to second-tier Eerste Divisie club De Graafschap for six months in January 2017. Upon the move, general director of Heracles, Nico-Jan Hoogma, stated: "Daryl has to play weekly at his age and that is possible at De Graafschap. Of course we will continue to follow Daryl closely, we wish him the best of luck." He made his debut for the club on 3 February 2017 as a starter in the 4–1 loss to VVV-Venlo away at De Koel. On 3 March, he scored his first goal in a 2–1 win over NAC Breda after an assist by Bryan Smeets after having come on as a second-half substitute for Anthony van den Hurk. Van Mieghem would also mostly feature as a substitute for De Graafschap, making only two starts in six months for the club. He would, however, make an impact with three goals in 14 total appearances.

On 18 July 2017, Van Mieghem's loan deal with De Graafschap was extended for another season. His second season with the club was a success, making 43 total appearances – of which 41 were as a starter – as he scored 18 goals and provided 16 assists. De Graafschap won promotion to the Eredivisie after beating Almere City in the finals of promotion play-offs by an aggregate score of 3–2. Despite his performances in the Eerste Divisie, Heracles would not extend Van Mieghem's expiring contract.

On 6 June 2018, Van Mieghem signed a permanent, one-year contract with De Graafschap after his contract with Heracles expired. In the Eredivisie, Van Mieghem was initially a starter, but lost his place in the lineup during the second half of the season to Furdjel Narsingh and upcoming youth player Delano Burgzorg. At the end of the season, the club suffered relegation to the Eerste Divise, while Van Mieghem had 35 appearances in which he scored once.

On 19 June 2019, Van Mieghem signed a one-season contract extension, keeping him at De Graafschap until 2020. This contract was extended by one more season in April 2020. He was a starter during the 2019–20 and 2020–21 seasons for De Graafschap, especially making an impact in the latter season with 38 appearances and 11 goals.

=== Volendam ===
On 5 June 2021, Van Mieghem signed a two-year contract with Volendam in the Eerste Divisie. He had become a free agent with his former club De Graafschap, despite attempts by manager Mike Snoei to sign him to another extension. He had a strong start to the season, recording five goals after five league games. Van Mieghem finished the season with 38 appearances and 11 goals, as Volendam won promotion to the Eredivisie by finishing second.

He immediately scored in his club's return to the top tier, slotting home after being assisted by Derry Murkin in a 2–2 draw against Groningen on 7 August 2022. He brought his goal tally to two goals in two games in the following league match on 14 August, scoring the opening goal in a 4–1 home loss to NEC.

=== ADO Den Haag ===
On 22 August 2023, van Mieghem signed a two-year contract with ADO Den Haag in the Eerste Divisie. On his competitive debut for the club on 25 August, he scored shortly before full-time, securing a 2–1 league victory against Den Bosch. On 20 October, he orchestrated an impressive ADO comeback by scoring just before the final whistle, overturning a 2–0 deficit into a remarkable 3–2 victory against Emmen. He secured his first brace for the club on 15 December, also assisting in Henk Veerman's goal, leading to a commanding 3–1 victory against NAC Breda.

== Style of play ==
Nicknamed Mipmip in his youth by coach Cor ten Bosch in reference to the Road Runner character of the Looney Tunes, Van Mieghem is known for his pace and dribbling skills. He is left-footed, and when deployed on the right wing he uses his speed and dribbling skills to take on defenders until he finds the space to make an attempt on goal.

== Career statistics ==
As of match played 24 October 2026

Appearances and goals by club, season and competition
Club	Season	League			KNVB Cup		Continental		Other		Total	
Club	Season	Division	Apps	Goals	Apps	Goals	Apps	Goals	Apps	Goals	Apps	Goals
Heracles Almelo	2011–12	Eredivisie	5	0	0	0	—		—		5	0
Heracles Almelo	2012–13	Eredivisie	2	0	1	0	—		—		3	0
Heracles Almelo	Total		7	0	1	0	—		—		8	0
Telstar	2013–14	Eerste Divisie	29	8	0	0	—		—		29	8
Excelsior	2014–15	Eredivisie	25	2	4	2	—		—		29	4
Excelsior	2015–16	Eredivisie	29	3	1	1	—		—		30	4
Excelsior	Total		54	5	5	3	—		—		59	8
Heracles Almelo	2016–17	Eredivisie	9	2	3	0	1 (Note: Appearances in UEFA Europa League)	0	—		13	2
De Graafschap (loan)	2016–17	Eerste Divisie	14	3	0	0	—		—		14	3
De Graafschap (loan)	2017–18	Eerste Divisie	38	16	1	0	—		4 (Note: Appearance(s) in promotion/relegation play-offs)	2	43	18
De Graafschap (loan)	Total		49	19	1	0	—		4	2	57	21
De Graafschap	2018–19	Eredivisie	33	1	2	0	—		2	0	37	1
De Graafschap	2019–20 (Note: Season curtailed due to COVID-19 pandemic in the Netherlands)	Eerste Divisie	21	9	1	0	—		—		22	9
De Graafschap	2020–21	Eerste Divisie	35	9	2	0	—		1	1	38	10
De Graafschap	Total		89	19	5	0	—		3	1	97	20
FC Volendam	2021–22	Eerste Divisie	37	11	1	0	—		—		38	11
FC Volendam	2022–23	Eredivisie	30	8	1	0	—		—		31	8
FC Volendam	2023–24	Eredivisie	2	1	—		—		—		2	1
FC Volendam	Total		69	20	2	0	—		—		71	20
ADO Den Haag	2023–24	Eerste Divisie	36	8	4	1	—		4	1	44	10
ADO Den Haag	2024–25	Eerste Divisie	34	10	1	0	—		2	0	37	10
ADO Den Haag	2025–26	Eerste Divisie	29	7	1	2	—		—		30	9
ADO Den Haag	2026–27	Eredivisie	10	0	1	0	—		—		11	0
ADO Den Haag	Total		109	25	7	3	—		6	1	122	29
Career total			414	98	24	6	1	0	13	4	452	108

== Honours ==
AFC

- Hoofdklasse – Sunday A: 2009–10

ADO Den Haag

- Eerste Divisie: 2025–26
