= Theo Timmermans (footballer, born 1926) =

Dutch footballer (1926–1995)

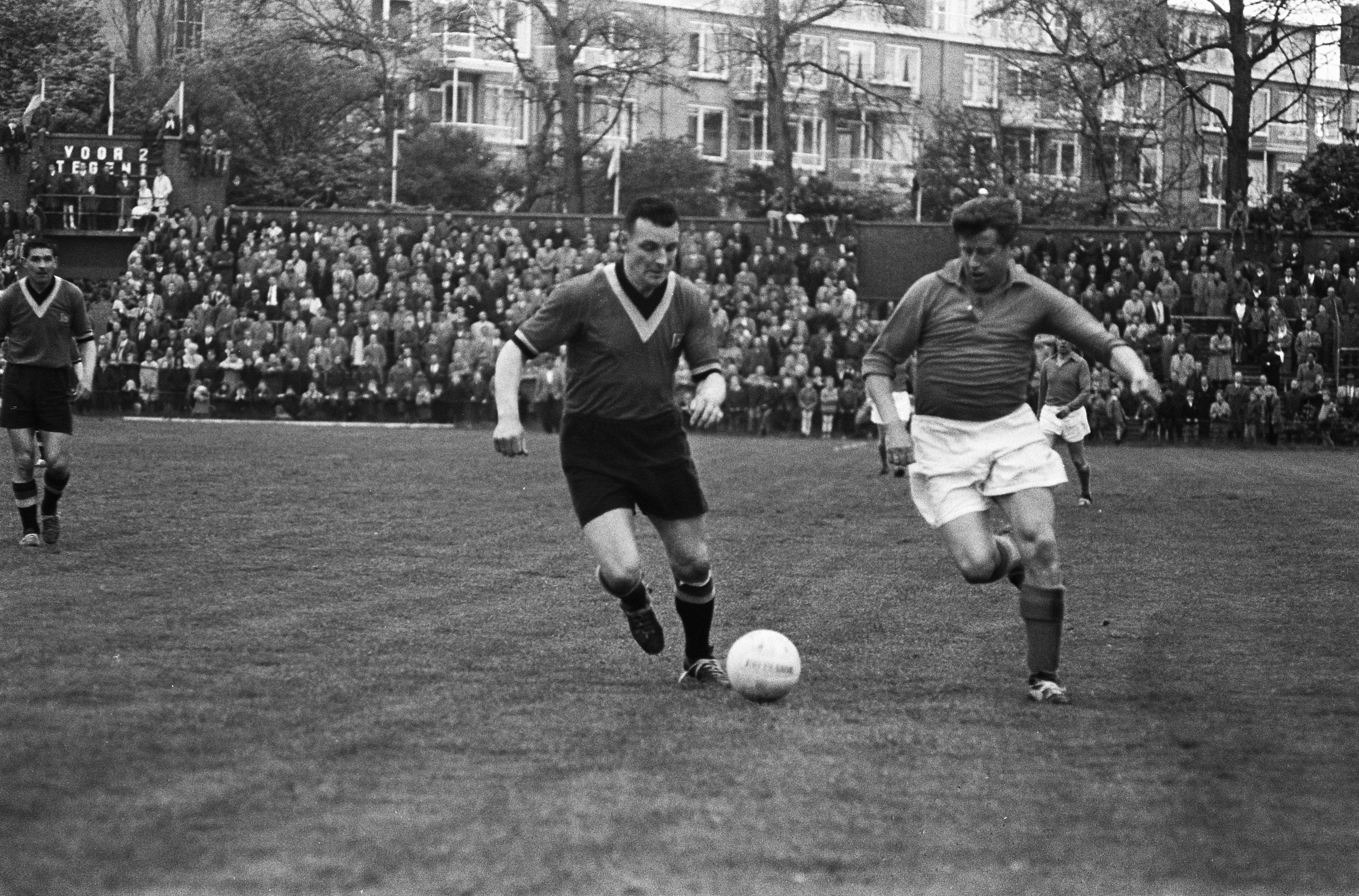
Timmermans (right) in a match against Belgium in 1963

Theodorus Ludovicus Timmermans (4 January 1926 – 6 January 2004) was a Dutch footballer who played as a forward from the mid-late 1940s. He played for two clubs starting at ADO '20 before joining Nîmes in 1949 and then moving back to ADO '20 in 1954. Timmermans wore the number 10 while playing for ADO '20. He played in twelve matches for the Netherlands national team.
