= 1977–78 Eerste Divisie =

22nd season of the second-tier football league in Netherlands

Eerste Divisie
- Season: 1977–78
- Champions: PEC Zwolle
- Promoted: PEC Zwolle; MVV
- Goals: 955
- Average goals/game: 2.79

The Dutch Eerste Divisie in the 1977–78 season was contested by 19 teams. PEC Zwolle won the championship.

== New entrants ==
Relegated from the 1976–77 Eredivisie

- FC Eindhoven
- De Graafschap

== League standings ==
Pos	Team	Pld	W	D	L	GF	GA	GD	Pts	Promotion or qualification
1	PEC Zwolle	36	23	8	5	83	31	+52	54	Promoted to Eredivisie.
2	MVV Maastricht	36	21	10	5	72	33	+39	52	Qualified for Promotion play-off as Period champions.
3	FC Wageningen	36	15	16	5	47	23	+24	46	Qualified for Promotion play-off as Period champions.
4	SBV Excelsior	36	16	13	7	69	38	+31	45	Qualified for Promotion play-off as Period champions.
5	Fortuna SC	36	17	11	8	66	41	+25	45	
6	FC Groningen	36	19	7	10	62	39	+23	45	Qualified for Promotion play-off as Period champions.
7	Willem II	36	15	10	11	55	39	+16	40	
8	FC Den Bosch	36	13	14	9	51	46	+5	40	
9	FC Eindhoven	36	13	11	12	49	48	+1	37	
10	SC Heracles	36	12	12	12	36	37	−1	36	
11	sc Heerenveen	36	12	12	12	40	43	−3	36	
12	SC Cambuur	36	13	10	13	46	53	−7	36	
13	FC Vlaardingen	36	8	14	14	29	40	−11	30	
14	De Graafschap	36	11	7	18	48	61	−13	29	
15	SVV	36	7	12	17	45	75	−30	26	
16	Helmond Sport	36	6	11	19	46	80	−34	23	
17	SC Veendam	36	5	12	19	46	81	−35	22	
18	FC Dordrecht	36	6	9	21	42	81	−39	21	
19	SC Amersfoort	36	6	9	21	23	66	−43	21	

Source: rsssf.com

== Promotion competition ==
In the promotion competition, four period winners (the best teams during each of the four quarters of the regular competition) played for promotion to the Eredivisie.

Pos	Team	Pld	W	D	L	GF	GA	GD	Pts	Promotion
1	MVV Maastricht	6	3	1	2	10	5	+5	7	Promoted to Eredivisie.
2	FC Groningen	6	2	3	1	7	4	+3	7	
3	FC Wageningen	6	3	1	2	10	8	+2	7	
4	SBV Excelsior	6	1	1	4	3	13	−10	3	

Source: rsssf.com

== Attendances ==
#	Club	Average
1	MVV	8,739
2	Zwolle	7,172
3	Groningen	6,478
4	Fortuna	4,278
5	Cambuur	4,017
6	Heracles	3,983
7	Heerenveen	3,922
8	Wageningen	3,894
9	Eindhoven	3,778
10	Den Bosch	3,622
11	Willem II	3,531
12	De Graafschap	2,978
13	Excelsior	2,922
14	Helmond	2,686
15	Veendam	2,567
16	SVV	2,461
17	Vlaardingen	2,003
18	Amersfoort	1,847
19	Dordrecht	1,772

== See also ==
- 1977–78 Eredivisie
- 1977–78 KNVB Cup
