= 1969–70 Eerste Divisie =

14th season of the second-tier football league in Netherlands

Eerste Divisie
- Season: 1969–70
- Champions: FC Volendam
- Promoted: SBV Excelsior; Fortuna Vlaardingen; De Graafschap
- Relegated: De Volewijckers; RCH; Fortuna Vlaardingen
- From Eredivisie: Fortuna SC; FC Volendam
- To Eredivisie: FC Volendam; SBV Excelsior
- Goals: 742
- Average goals/game: 2.42
- Top goalscorer: (Netherlands) Gerrie Deijkers; Willem II; 24 goals

The Dutch Eerste Divisie in the 1969–70 season was contested by 18 teams. FC Volendam won the championship.

== New entrants ==
Promoted from the 1968–69 Tweede Divisie:

- SBV Excelsior
- Fortuna Vlaardingen
- De Graafschap

Relegated from the 1968–69 Eredivisie:

- Fortuna SC
- FC Volendam

== League standings ==
Pos	Team	Pld	W	D	L	GF	GA	GD	Pts	Promotion or relegation
1	FC Volendam	34	19	11	4	57	22	+35	49	Promoted to Eredivisie.
2	SBV Excelsior	34	19	10	5	56	31	+25	48	Promoted to Eredivisie.
3	Blauw-Wit Amsterdam	34	16	13	5	41	20	+21	45	
4	Elinkwijk	34	17	9	8	52	35	+17	43	Merged with DOS & Velox to form FC Utrecht.
5	FC Den Bosch	34	13	14	7	39	24	+15	40	
6	Willem II	34	15	9	10	42	37	+5	39	
7	Vitesse Arnhem	34	13	6	15	54	55	−1	32	
8	SC Cambuur	34	9	14	11	41	43	−2	32	
9	De Graafschap	34	12	8	14	49	51	−2	32	
10	Heracles	34	9	12	13	33	40	−7	30	
11	HVC	34	9	12	13	34	45	−11	30	
12	Veendam	34	10	10	14	38	49	−11	30	
13	Helmond Sport	34	10	9	15	26	32	−6	29	
14	Fortuna SC	34	9	11	14	39	51	−12	29	
15	DFC	34	8	12	14	36	45	−9	28	
16	De Volewijckers	34	10	8	16	37	51	−14	28	Relegated to Tweede Divisie.
17	RCH	34	10	6	18	35	56	−21	26	Relegated to Tweede Divisie.
18	Fortuna Vlaardingen	34	7	8	19	33	55	−22	22	Relegated to Tweede Divisie.

Source: rsssf.com

== Attendances ==
#	Club	Average
1	Vitesse	5,676
2	De Graafschap	5,212
3	Volendam	5,000
4	Elinkwijk	4,982
5	Excelsior	4,824
6	Blauw-Wit	4,765
7	Den Bosch	4,412
8	Willem II	4,382
9	Cambuur	4,324
10	Veendam	4,176
11	Helmond	3,559
12	Fortuna	3,194
13	Heracles	3,126
14	DFC	2,941
15	Vlaardingen	2,929
16	De Volewijckers	2,682
17	HVC	2,512
18	RCH	1,929

== See also ==
- 1969–70 Eredivisie
- 1969–70 Tweede Divisie
- 1969–70 KNVB Cup
