= 1968–69 Eerste Divisie =

13th season of the second-tier football league in Netherlands

Eerste Divisie
- Season: 1968–69
- Champions: SVV
- Promoted: Helmond Sport; Veendam; FC Wageningen
- Relegated: FC Eindhoven; FC Wageningen; RBC
- From Eredivisie: None
- To Eredivisie: SVV; HFC Haarlem
- Goals: 800
- Average goals/game: 2.61

The Dutch Eerste Divisie in the 1968–69 season was contested by 18 teams, one less than in the previous season. This was because no teams relegated from the 1967–68 Eredivisie. Schiedamse Voetbal Vereniging (SVV) won the championship.

== New entrants ==
Promoted from the 1967–68 Tweede Divisie:

- Helmond Sport
- Veendam
- FC Wageningen

== League standings ==
Pos	Team	Pld	W	D	L	GF	GA	GD	Pts	Promotion or relegation
1	SVV	34	21	5	8	71	44	+27	47	Promoted to Eredivisie.
2	HFC Haarlem	34	19	8	7	51	30	+21	46	Promoted to Eredivisie.
3	Vitesse Arnhem	34	16	10	8	57	43	+14	42	
4	SC Cambuur	34	17	7	10	50	40	+10	41	
5	Blauw-Wit Amsterdam	34	15	7	12	51	39	+12	37	
6	Helmond Sport	34	12	13	9	42	34	+8	37	
7	Veendam	34	15	7	12	54	55	−1	37	
8	DFC	34	14	7	13	41	33	+8	35	
9	FC Den Bosch	34	13	9	12	44	39	+5	35	
10	Heracles	34	11	11	12	38	43	−5	33	
11	RCH	34	11	11	12	43	50	−7	33	
12	Elinkwijk	34	10	11	13	47	49	−2	31	
13	HVC	34	10	11	13	34	40	−6	31	
14	Willem II	34	13	5	16	33	44	−11	31	
15	FC Eindhoven	34	10	10	14	49	54	−5	30	Relegation play-off as level on points.
16	De Volewijckers	34	9	12	13	41	47	−6	30	Relegation play-off as level on points.
17	FC Wageningen	34	9	6	19	34	52	−18	24	Relegated to Tweede Divisie.
18	RBC Roosendaal	34	4	4	26	20	64	−44	12	Relegated to Tweede Divisie.

Source: rsssf.com

=== Relegation play-off ===
Volewijckers and FC Eindhoven played a relegation play-off at a neutral venue (Vitesse)

Team 1	Score	Team 2
De Volewijckers	1 - 0	FC Eindhoven

FC Eindhoven were relegated to the Tweede Divisie.

== Attendances ==
#	Club	Average
1	Vitesse	8,412
2	Haarlem	6,765
3	SVV	6,529
4	Den Bosch	5,182
5	Cambuur	5,029
6	Elinkwijk	4,994
7	Veendam	4,382
8	RCH	4,188
9	Willem II	4,118
10	Heracles	4,000
11	Helmond	3,929
12	Eindhoven	3,876
13	DFC	3,441
14	Blauw-Wit	3,194
15	HVC	3,171
16	Wageningen	2,971
17	RBC	2,100
18	De Volewijckers	1,959

== See also ==
- 1968–69 Eredivisie
- 1968–69 Tweede Divisie
