= 1969–70 KNVB Cup =

Tournament details
- Country: Netherlands
- Teams: 53

Final positions
- Champions: Ajax
- Runners-up: PSV Eindhoven

The 1969–70 KNVB Cup was the 53rd edition of the Dutch national football annual knockout tournament for the KNVB Cup. It began on 19 October 1969 and ended with the final on 27 May 1970.

Eventual champions Ajax lost to AZ '67 in the Third Round of the competition, however were placed into the Quarter Final as lucky losers. The lucky loser rule had been in use for multiple years due to the KNVB Cup only allowing professional clubs to enter which sometimes produced irregular numbers, but was immediately abolished due to the backlash.

Defending champions Feyenoord lost in the Second Round to GVAV-Rapiditas. Since winners Ajax were also champions of the 1969-70 Eredivisie so entered the 1970–71 European Cup, runners-up PSV Eindhoven qualified for the 1970–71 European Cup Winners' Cup (they would reach the semi finals).

== First Round ==
There were 53 teams competing in the KNVB Cup, with holders Feyenoord receiving a bye into the Second Round. The matches of the first round were played on 19 August 1969. Of the Eredivisie sides in the First Round, three were eliminated: SV SVV, NEC Nijmegen, and Holland Sport.

Tie no	Home team	Score	Away team	Date
1	SC Drente	0–6	Go Ahead Eagles	19 October 1969
2	Velox	2-1	SVV	19 October 1969
3	Fortuna Vlaardingen	3-1	SC Cambuur	19 October 1969
4	Racing Club Heemstede	1-3	AFC DWS	19 October 1969
5	Zaanlandsche Football Club	0-2	SC Telstar	19 October 1969
6	Heracles Almelo	0-1	FC Den Bosch '67	19 October 1969
7	FC Wageningen	2-4	NAC Breda	19 October 1969
8	RBC Roosendaal	4-1	Fortuna Sittard	19 October 1969
9	Helmond Sport	0-2	Willem II	19 October 1969
10	HVC	0-1	De Volewijckers	19 October 1969
11	Roda JC	0-1	GVAV-Rapiditas	19 October 1969
12	SC Heerenveen	1-2	VV DOS	19 October 1969
13	Vitesse	3-1	Blauw-Wit Amsterdam	19 October 1969
14	VVV-Venlo	0-6	ADO Den Haag	19 October 1969
15	De Graafschap	1-0	Dordrechtse Football Club	19 October 1969
16	SC Gooiland	0-0 (p)	AZ '67	19 October 1969
17	TSV NOAD	0-2	HFC Haarlem	19 October 1969
18	Hermes DVS	2-0	SC Veendam	19 October 1969
19	VV Baronie	1-3	MVV Maastricht	19 October 1969
20	USV Elinkwijk	1-0	NEC Nijmegen	19 October 1969
21	AGOVV	1-0	FC Volendam	19 October 1969
22	EVV Eindhoven	1-2	PSV Eindhoven	14 December 1969
23	SV Limburgia	1-6	Sparta Rotterdam	14 December 1969
24	PEC Zwolle	0-3	FC Twente	14 December 1969
25	HFC EDO	0-4	Ajax	14 December 1969
26	Excelsior Rotterdam	(p) 2-2	Holland Sport	14 December 1969

== Second Round ==
After a bye to the second round, reigning champions Feyenoord were defeated by GVAV-Rapiditas. AGOVV got a bye to the Third Round.

Tie no	Home team	Score	Away team	Date
1	De Volewijckers	0–1	De Graafschap	1 March 1970
2	Fortuna Sittard	1-2	AZ '67	1 March 1970
3	PSV Eindhoven	4-2	FC Den Bosch '67	1 March 1970
4	SC Telstar	5-0	Excelsior Rotterdam	1 March 1970
5	Sparta Rotterdam	1-2	HFC Haarlem	1 March 1970
6	ADO Den Haag	4-1	VV DOS	1 March 1970
7	Go Ahead Eagles	3-0	RBC Roosendaal	1 March 1970
8	FC Twente	3-2	NAC Breda	1 March 1970
9	USV Elinkwijk	1-0 AET	Willem II	1 March 1970
10	MVV Maastricht	1-0	Velox	1 March 1970
11	AFC DWS	3-1 AET	Hermes DVS	1 March 1970
12	Vitesse	1-3	Ajax	1 March 1970
13	Feyenoord	0-1	GVAV-Rapiditas	12 March 1970

== Third Round ==
There were only an irregular 14 teams in the Third Round, meaning to make up 8 teams for the Quarter Finals, one losing team would be selected as lucky loser to advance. This would be Ajax. Out of the 14 teams, 11 were in the Eredivisie, 2 were in the Eerste Divisie, and 1 was in the Tweede Divisie: AGOVV, who had received a bye in the Second Round. Three of the seven matches would be determined by penalties.

Tie no	Home team	Score	Away team	Date
1	AZ '67	2-1	Ajax	12 April 1970
2	Go Ahead Eagles	0-0 (p)	FC Twente	12 April 1970
3	ADO Den Haag	(p) 2-2	HFC Haarlem	12 April 1970
4	PSV Eindhoven	(p) 1-1	SC Telstar	12 April 1970
5	GVAV-Rapiditas	2-0	MVV Maastricht	12 April 1970
6	De Graafschap	1-2	USV Elinkwijk	12 April 1970
7	AGOVV	1-4	AFC DWS	12 April 1970

== Quarter Final ==
Out of the 8 remaining teams, 7 were from the Eredivisie, while Elinkwijk was the only team remaining from the second tier. The Quarter Finals took place on 22 April.

Tie no	Home team	Score	Away team	Date
1	FC Twente	2-0	USV Elinkwijk	22 April 1970
2	PSV Eindhoven	2-0	ADO Den Haag	22 April 1970
3	GVAV-Rapiditas	1-0	AZ '67	22 April 1970
4	AFC DWS	1-2	Ajax	22 April 1970

== Semi Final ==
All clubs that took part in the Semi Finals were in the Eredivisie. The Semi Finals, as usual, took place in neutral stadiums, although Ajax ended up playing in Amsterdam in the Olympic Stadium, which they used as their home ground for European matches. Ajax and PSV Eindhoven advanced to the final.

14 May

Ajax	4–0	FC Twente
Johan Cruyff 25', 70'; Dick van Dijk 33'; Tom Søndergaard 79'

Olympic Stadium
Attendance: 10,893
14 May

PSV Eindhoven	1–0	GVAV-Rapiditas
Willy van der Kuijlen 14'

Goffertstadion
Attendance: 10,000

== Final ==
The 1970 KNVB Cup final took place between Ajax and PSV Eindhoven on 27 May 1970. The match took place at the neutral ground, De Vliert in 's-Hertogenbosch, with an attendance of 30,000. The goals for Ajax came from Piet Keizer and Johan Cruyff. The final took place after Ajax won the 1969–70 Eredivisie, and this was their 5th Cup title. As Ajax had already won the title, PSV qualified for the 1970–71 European Cup Winners' Cup.

27 May 1965

Ajax	2–0	PSV Eindhoven
Keizer 22'; Cruyff 69'

De Vliert, 's-Hertogenbosch
Attendance: 30,000
