= 1969–70 Tweede Divisie =

Tweede Divisie
- Season: 1969–70
- Champions: sc Heerenveen
- Promoted: sc Heerenveen; FC Wageningen
- Goals scored: 727
- Average goals/game: 2.67

The Dutch Tweede Divisie in the 1969–70 season was contested by 17 teams. sc Heerenveen won the championship and were promoted to the Eerste Divisie along with runners-up FC Wageningen.

== New entrants ==
Relegated from the Eerste Divisie:

- FC Eindhoven
- FC Wageningen
- RBC

== League standings ==
Pos	Team	Pld	W	D	L	GF	GA	GD	Pts	Promotion
1	sc Heerenveen	32	19	8	5	60	26	+34	46	Promoted to Eerste Divisie.
2	FC Wageningen	32	19	6	7	70	29	+41	44	Promoted to Eerste Divisie.
3	Velox	32	18	8	6	46	26	+20	44	Merged with DOS & Elinkwijk to form FC Utrecht.
4	FC Eindhoven	32	14	13	5	49	29	+20	41	
5	PEC	32	15	9	8	57	38	+19	39	
6	Hermes DVS	32	14	10	8	53	34	+19	38	
7	RBC Roosendaal	32	14	10	8	39	34	+5	38	
8	Limburgia	32	14	8	10	50	51	−1	36	
9	Roda JC	32	14	7	11	41	36	+5	35	
10	VV Baronie	32	11	11	10	41	41	0	33	
11	TSV NOAD	32	9	8	15	43	52	−9	26	
12	SC Gooiland	32	7	12	13	37	52	−15	26	
13	ZFC	32	6	12	14	32	49	−17	24	
14	SC Drente	32	9	3	20	30	50	−20	21	
15	AGOVV Apeldoorn	32	7	7	18	26	57	−31	21	
16	VVV-Venlo	32	5	8	19	29	61	−32	18	
17	HFC EDO	32	3	8	21	24	62	−38	14	

Source: rsssf.com

== See also ==
- 1969–70 Eredivisie
- 1969–70 Eerste Divisie
- 1969–70 KNVB Cup
