= 1967–68 Tweede Divisie =

Tweede Divisie
- Season: 1967–68
- Champions: FC Wageningen
- Promoted: FC Wageningen; Helmond Sport; Veendam
- Goals scored: 1,095
- Average goals/game: 2.88

The Dutch Tweede Divisie in the 1967–68 season was contested by 20 teams. FC Wageningen won the championship and would be promoted to the Eerste Divisie along with two other teams.

== New entrants ==
Relegated from the Eerste Divisie:

- De Graafschap
- SC Drente

(Helmond Sport played as Helmondia '55 last season)

== League standings ==
Pos	Team	Pld	W	D	L	GF	GA	GD	Pts	Promotion or qualification
1	FC Wageningen	38	21	9	8	75	45	+30	51	Promoted to Eerste Divisie
2	Helmond Sport	38	18	13	7	59	25	+34	49	Promotion play-off as level on points
3	Veendam	38	20	9	9	63	40	+23	49	Promotion play-off as level on points
4	Fortuna Vlaardingen	38	21	7	10	64	46	+18	49	Promotion play-off as level on points
5	Roda JC	38	20	8	10	65	54	+11	48	
6	De Graafschap	38	18	8	12	62	47	+15	44	
7	SC Gooiland	38	13	16	9	52	57	−5	42	
8	HFC EDO	38	12	16	10	46	43	+3	40	
9	VV Baronie	38	15	9	14	81	66	+15	39	
10	Hermes DVS	38	12	15	11	53	51	+2	39	
11	Limburgia	38	11	14	13	64	54	+10	36	
12	ZFC	38	11	14	13	38	41	−3	36	
13	TSV NOAD	38	13	10	15	54	61	−7	36	
14	PEC	38	12	10	16	57	68	−11	34	
15	sc Heerenveen	38	10	13	15	63	60	+3	33	
16	SBV Excelsior	38	11	11	16	44	49	−5	33	
17	AGOVV Apeldoorn	38	11	10	17	41	66	−25	32	
18	SC Drente	38	11	9	18	55	69	−14	31	
19	Zwolsche Boys	38	7	9	22	29	76	−47	23	
20	FC Hilversum	38	4	8	26	30	87	−57	16	Voluntarily returned to amateur football

Source: rsssf.com

== Promotion play-off ==
Owing to the second-, third-, and fourth-place finishers obtaining an equal number of points, a promotion play-off needed to be held. Two teams would be promoted to the Eerste Divisie.

Pos	Team	Pld	W	D	L	GF	GA	GD	Pts	Promotion
1	Helmond Sport	2	2	0	0	6	1	+5	4	Promoted to Eerste Divisie
2	Veendam	2	1	0	1	3	6	−3	2	Promoted to Eerste Divisie
3	Fortuna Vlaardingen	2	0	0	2	1	3	−2	0	

Source: rsssf.com

== See also ==
- 1967–68 Eredivisie
- 1967–68 Eerste Divisie
