= Kees Kist =

Dutch footballer and manager (born 1952)

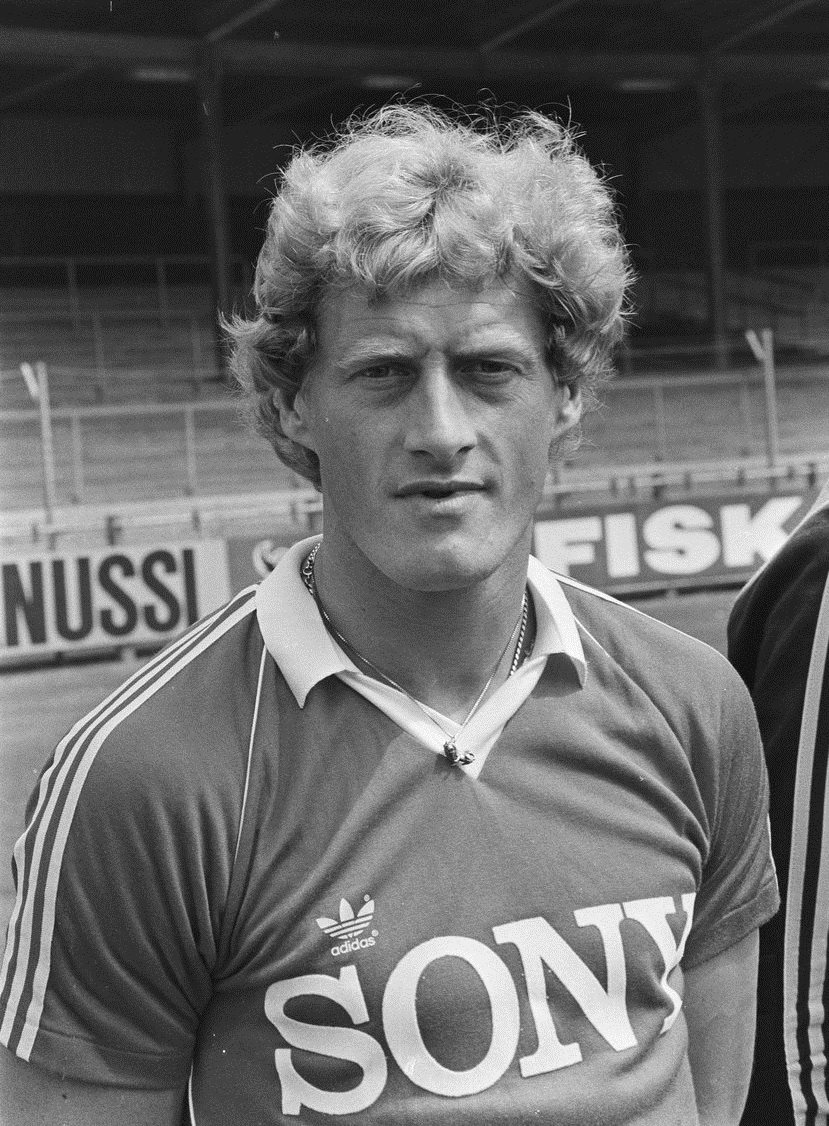
- Kist in 1982

Personal information
- Full name: Cornelis Kist
- Date of birth: 7 August 1952 (age 74)
- Place of birth: Steenwijk, Netherlands
- Position: Forward

Youth career
- VV Steenwijk

Senior career*
Years	Team	Apps	(Gls)
1970–1972	Heerenveen	0	(0)
1972–1982	AZ '67	323	(196)
1982–1984	Paris Saint-Germain	34	(12)
1983–1984	→ Mulhouse (loan)	27	(10)
1984–1985	AZ '67	49	(15)
1985–1987	Heerenveen	39	(17)
Total		472	(250)

International career
1975–1980	Netherlands	21	(4)

Managerial career
- 2000–2005: HSV Hoek
Medal record
Representing Netherlands
UEFA European Championship
Third place	1976 Yugoslavia
- * Club domestic league appearances and goals

Cornelis Kist (born 7 August 1952) is a Dutch former professional football player and manager. He played as a striker, and most notably won the European Golden Shoe for the 1978–79 season.

== Club career ==
Born in Steenwijk, Kist started his career at SC Heerenveen after coming over from youth club VV Steenwijk in 1970. Two other family members already played at this club: his cousin and namesake Cees Kist ("Big Kees") and the defender Teun Kist. Kees Kist would later mainly appear for AZ '67. He was the main goalscorer of AZ, who during six consecutive seasons from 1976–77 to 1981–82 finished in the top 4 in the league table of the Eredivisie.

Together with Austrian Kurt Welzl and the Volendam native Pier Tol, he led the AZ offense to a league title in the 1980–81 season; twelve points ahead of Ajax and also outperforming the Dutch giants on goal difference by +71 against +34. Their performances also led to KNVB Cup wins in 1978, 1981 and 1982, and the 1981 UEFA Cup Final. In addition to strikers Welzl and Tol, Kist also played at AZ '67 together with, among others, midfielders Peter Arntz and Jan Peters and centre backs Ronald Spelbos and John Metgod.

Kist was renowned for his powerful shot. He won the European Golden Shoe of the 1978–79 season with 34 goals in the Eredivisie, making him the first Dutch footballer to win this award. He also won the Eredivisie Golden Boot twice. In the summer of 1982, Kist left AZ for French club Paris Saint-Germain, and was sent on loan to recently relegated FC Mulhouse for the 1983–84 season. He returned to his old club AZ in late summer 1984, before retiring as part of his first senior club, Heerenveen, under head coach Foppe de Haan. Kist scored a total of 212 goals in the Eredivisie, which puts him in fourth place on the all-time leaders list, behind Willy van der Kuijlen, Ruud Geels and Johan Cruijff.

After his career, he has worked as a reporter for De Telegraaf, and sells shoes.

The AZ home ground, AFAS Stadion, has a Kees Kist Lounge.

== International career ==
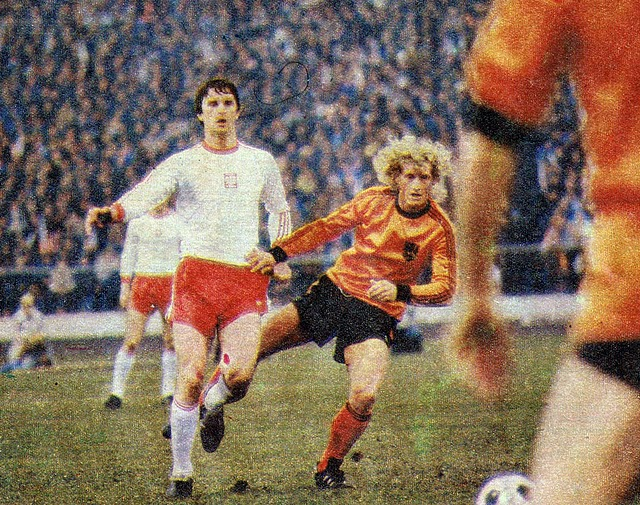
Kist (right) challenging Władysław Żmuda during a match against Poland in May 1979

Kist obtained 21 caps for the Netherlands national team, in which he scored four goals, in the years 1975–1980.

== Managerial career ==
From 2000 through 2005 Kist managed HSV Hoek. He has also coached Steenwijker Boys and Tolbert.

== Career statistics ==
=== International ===
Appearances and goals by national team and year
National team	Year	Apps	Goals
Netherlands	1975	3	0
Netherlands	1976	2	0
Netherlands	1977	3	0
Netherlands	1978	0	0
Netherlands	1979	6	2
Netherlands	1980	7	2
Total		21	4

Scores and results list the Netherlands' goal tally first, score column indicates score after each Kist goal.

List of international goals scored by Kees Kist
No.	Date	Venue	Opponent	Score	Result	Competition
1	28 March 1979	Philips Stadion, Eindhoven, Netherlands	Switzerland	1–0	3–0	UEFA Euro 1980 qualification
2	21 November 1979	Zentralstadion, Leipzig, East Germany	East Germany	2–2	3–2	UEFA Euro 1980 qualification
3	11 June 1980	Stadio San Paolo, Naples, Italy	Greece	1–0	1–0	UEFA Euro 1980
4	17 June 1980	San Siro, Milan, Italy	Czechoslovakia	1–1	1–1	UEFA Euro 1980

== Honours ==
AZ '67

- Eredivisie: 1980–81
- KNVB Cup: 1977–78, 1980–81, 1981–82

Paris Saint-Germain

- Coupe de France: 1982–83

Individual

- Eredivisie Golden Boot: 1978–79, 1979–80
- European Golden Shoe: 1978–79

Records

- Most goals scored for AZ in European competitions: 18
