= 1981–82 Eerste Divisie =

26th season of the second-tier football league in Netherlands

Eerste Divisie
- Season: 1981–82
- Champions: Helmond Sport
- Promoted: Helmond Sport; Fortuna Sittard; Excelsior
- Goals: 873
- Average goals/game: 2.85

The Dutch Eerste Divisie in the 1981–82 season was contested by 18 teams, one less than in the previous season. This was due to the bankruptcy of FC Vlaardingen. Helmond Sport won the championship.

From this season onwards, instead of two, three teams would promote to the eredivisie. Two were promoted directly and one through a promotion competition which was organized the same as in previous seasons.

== New entrants ==
Relegated from the 1980–81 Eredivisie

- SBV Excelsior
- FC Wageningen

== League standings ==
Pos	Team	Pld	W	D	L	GF	GA	GD	Pts	Promotion or qualification
1	Helmond Sport	34	17	14	3	53	30	+23	48	Promoted to Eredivisie.
2	Fortuna Sittard	34	21	5	8	62	35	+27	47	Promoted to Eredivisie.
3	SBV Excelsior	34	18	8	8	74	44	+30	44	Qualified for Promotion play-off as Period champions.
4	Telstar	34	16	12	6	44	31	+13	44	Qualified for Promotion play-off as Period champions.
5	FC Den Bosch	34	17	7	10	62	41	+21	41	
6	sc Heerenveen	34	17	7	10	61	43	+18	41	Qualified for Promotion play-off as Period champions.
7	VVV-Venlo	34	15	11	8	64	47	+17	41	Qualified for Promotion play-off as Period champions.
8	Vitesse Arnhem	34	12	12	10	52	45	+7	36	
9	SVV	34	12	9	13	44	40	+4	33	
10	SC Veendam	34	10	10	14	46	54	−8	30	
11	SC Cambuur	34	8	13	13	23	38	−15	29	
12	FC Volendam	34	9	10	15	42	49	−7	28	
13	FC Amsterdam	34	10	8	16	37	54	−17	28	Disbanded as season's end.
14	FC Eindhoven	34	10	7	17	41	64	−23	27	
15	DS '79	34	7	12	15	51	66	−15	26	
16	Heracles	34	9	8	17	48	68	−20	26	
17	FC Wageningen	34	4	14	16	33	52	−19	22	
18	SC Amersfoort	34	6	9	19	36	72	−36	21	

Source: rsssf.com

== Promotion competition ==
In the promotion competition, four period winners (the best teams during each of the four quarters of the regular competition) played for promotion to the Eredivisie.

Pos	Team	Pld	W	D	L	GF	GA	GD	Pts	Promotion
1	SBV Excelsior	6	3	2	1	9	6	+3	8	Promoted to Eredivisie.
2	sc Heerenveen	6	4	0	2	5	6	−1	8	
3	VVV-Venlo	6	2	1	3	10	9	+1	5	
4	Telstar	6	1	1	4	6	9	−3	3	

Source: rsssf.com

== Attendances ==
#	Club	Average
1	Helmond	6,706
2	Fortuna	6,235
3	Cambuur	4,894
4	VVV	4,688
5	Heerenveen	4,394
6	Den Bosch	3,171
7	Veendam	2,759
8	DS '79	2,712
9	Vitesse	2,624
10	Wageningen	2,444
11	Excelsior	2,321
12	Telstar	2,294
13	Eindhoven	2,276
14	Heracles	2,168
15	Volendam	2,100
16	Amersfoort	1,741
17	SVV	1,707
18	Amsterdam	1,013

== See also ==
- 1981–82 Eredivisie
- 1981–82 KNVB Cup
