= 1973–74 Eerste Divisie =

18th season of the second-tier football league in Netherlands

Eerste Divisie
- Season: 1973–74
- Champions: Excelsior Rotterdam
- Promoted: Excelsior Rotterdam; FC Wageningen
- Goals: 963
- Average goals/game: 2.53

The Dutch Eerste Divisie was contested by 20 teams in the 1973–74 season. Excelsior won the championship.

== New entrants ==
Relegated from the 1972–73 Eredivisie

- FC Den Bosch
- Excelsior

HVC changed their name to SC Amersfoort for this season.

== League standings ==
Pos	Team	Pld	W	D	L	GF	GA	GD	Pts	Promotion or qualification
1	Excelsior Rotterdam	38	21	10	7	68	35	+33	52	Promoted to Eredivisie.
2	Vitesse Arnhem	38	20	8	10	68	44	+24	48	Qualified for Promotion play-off as Period champions.
3	sc Heerenveen	38	18	11	9	53	30	+23	47	
4	FC Wageningen	38	18	10	10	48	36	+12	46	Qualified for Promotion play-off as Period champions.
5	Fortuna SC	38	16	12	10	47	33	+14	44	Qualified for Promotion play-off as Period champions.
6	Helmond Sport	38	17	9	12	53	44	+9	43	
7	PEC Zwolle	38	14	12	12	55	46	+9	40	
8	FC Volendam	38	16	7	15	55	44	+11	39	
9	SVV	38	14	11	13	41	55	−14	39	
10	Heracles	38	12	14	12	47	39	+8	38	
11	SC Cambuur	38	13	12	13	47	43	+4	38	
12	FC Eindhoven	38	12	12	14	42	47	−5	36	
13	Fortuna Vlaardingen	38	10	15	13	38	44	−6	35	Changed name to FC Vlaardingen for next season.
14	SC Amersfoort	38	12	11	15	38	47	−9	35	Qualified for Promotion play-off as Period champions.
15	FC Dordrecht	38	12	11	15	45	66	−21	35	
16	VVV-Venlo	38	8	17	13	46	53	−7	33	
17	FC Den Bosch	38	10	10	18	46	52	−6	30	
18	Willem II	38	8	13	17	41	65	−24	29	
19	Veendam	38	9	9	20	44	74	−30	27	
20	De Volewijckers	38	8	10	20	41	66	−25	26	Merged into FC Amsterdam for next season.

Source: rsssf.com

== Promotion competition ==
In the promotion competition, four period winners (the best teams during each of the four quarters of the regular competition) played for promotion to the eredivisie.

Pos	Team	Pld	W	D	L	GF	GA	GD	Pts	Promotion
1	FC Wageningen	6	2	4	0	12	6	+6	8	Promoted to Eredivisie.
2	Fortuna SC	6	3	2	1	8	4	+4	8	
3	Vitesse Arnhem	6	0	4	2	4	8	−4	4	
4	SC Amersfoort	6	1	2	3	4	10	−6	4	

Source: rsssf.com

== Attendances ==
#	Club	Average
1	Fortuna	5,274
2	Heerenveen	5,000
3	Vitesse	4,974
4	VVV	4,542
5	Volendam	3,800
6	Excelsior	3,776
7	Helmond	3,711
8	Cambuur	3,461
9	Zwolle	3,195
10	Dordrecht	3,129
11	SVV	3,079
12	Den Bosch	2,884
13	Vlaardingen	2,737
14	Willem II	2,700
15	Amersfoort	2,508
16	Wageningen	2,408
17	Heracles	2,174
18	Veendam	1,995
19	Eindhoven	1,934
20	De Volewijckers	1,684

== See also ==
- 1973–74 Eredivisie
- 1973–74 KNVB Cup
