= 1972–73 Eerste Divisie =

17th season of the second-tier football league in Netherlands

Eerste Divisie
- Season: 1972–73
- Champions: Roda JC
- Promoted: None: Tweede Divisie disbanded; promotion to Eredivisie shown here starting next season
- From Eredivisie: Vitesse Arnhem; FC Volendam
- To Eredivisie: Roda JC; De Graafschap
- Goals: 913
- Average goals/game: 2.40

The Dutch Eerste Divisie in the 1972–73 season was contested by 20 teams, one less than in the previous year. This was due to the merger of Blauw-Wit Amsterdam with eredivisie-club DWS to form FC Amsterdam. Roda JC won the championship.

It was the first season in which a promotion competition was held. In this promotion competition, four period winners (the best teams during each of the four quarters of the regular competition) played for promotion to the eredivisie.

== New entrants ==
Relegated from the 1971–72 Eredivisie

- Vitesse Arnhem
- FC Volendam

DFC changed their name to FC Dordrecht for this season.

== League standings ==
Pos	Team	Pld	W	D	L	GF	GA	GD	Pts	Promotion or qualification
1	Roda JC	38	19	14	5	54	32	+22	52	Promoted to Eredivisie.
2	PEC Zwolle	38	20	8	10	72	48	+24	48	Qualified for Promotion play-off as Period champions.
3	Vitesse Arnhem	38	19	10	9	58	38	+20	48	
4	De Graafschap	38	15	17	6	52	34	+18	47	Qualified for Promotion play-off as Period champions.
5	Helmond Sport	38	15	17	6	53	38	+15	47	
6	FC Volendam	38	19	7	12	65	35	+30	45	Qualified for Promotion play-off as Period champions.
7	SC Cambuur	38	12	20	6	53	40	+13	44	
8	FC Wageningen	38	17	10	11	57	52	+5	44	Qualified for Promotion play-off as Period champions.
9	Fortuna SC	38	14	14	10	40	36	+4	42	
10	sc Heerenveen	38	14	13	11	44	43	+1	41	
11	FC Eindhoven	38	14	9	15	48	45	+3	37	
12	Veendam	38	9	16	13	40	50	−10	34	
13	SVV	38	8	17	13	26	41	−15	33	
14	Willem II	38	9	14	15	39	55	−16	32	
15	Heracles	38	9	12	17	45	58	−13	30	
16	HVC	38	5	18	15	40	52	−12	28	Changed name next season to SC Amersfoort.
17	Fortuna Vlaardingen	38	9	10	19	30	48	−18	28	
18	VVV-Venlo	38	6	16	16	25	45	−20	28	
19	De Volewijckers	38	6	16	16	43	65	−22	28	
20	FC Dordrecht	38	3	18	17	29	58	−29	24	

Source: rsssf.com

== Promotion competition ==
In the promotion competition, four period winners (the best teams during each of the four quarters of the regular competition) played for promotion to the Eredivisie.

Pos	Team	Pld	W	D	L	GF	GA	GD	Pts	Promotion
1	De Graafschap	6	4	1	1	10	6	+4	9	Promoted to Eredivisie.
2	FC Volendam	6	4	0	2	15	6	+9	8	
3	FC Wageningen	6	1	2	3	8	14	−6	4	
4	PEC Zwolle	6	0	3	3	8	15	−7	3	

Source: rsssf.com

== Attendances ==
#	Club	Average
1	Roda	7,789
2	Vitesse	6,447
3	De Graafschap	5,921
4	Zwolle	4,921
5	Helmond	4,816
6	Fortuna	4,361
7	Heerenveen	4,342
8	Cambuur	3,868
9	Volendam	3,768
10	Eindhoven	3,737
11	Wageningen	3,668
12	VVV	3,258
13	Dordrecht	2,992
14	SVV	2,737
15	Willem II	2,658
16	Heracles	2,642
17	HVC	2,629
18	Vlaardingen	2,513
19	Veendam	2,479
20	De Volewijckers	1,811

== See also ==
- 1972–73 Eredivisie
- 1972–73 KNVB Cup
