= 1978–79 KNVB Cup =

Tournament details
- Country: Netherlands
- Teams: 46

Final positions
- Champions: Ajax
- Runners-up: FC Twente

The 1978-79 KNVB Cup 61st edition of the Dutch national football annual knockout tournament for the KNVB Cup. 46 teams contested, beginning on 19 August 1978 and ending at the final on 15 May 1979.

Ajax – FC Twente ended a draw: 1–1 (aet). Instead of a penalty shootout, a replay was held on 29 May. In that match, Ajax beat FC Twente 3–0 and won the cup for the eighth time.

During the quarter and semi-finals of the tournament, two-legged matches were held.

== Teams ==
- All 18 participants of the Eredivisie 1978-79
- All 19 participants of the Eerste Divisie 1978-79
- 9 teams from lower (amateur) leagues

== First round ==
The matches of the first round were played on 19-20 August 1978.

Home team	Result	Away team
VV Rheden _{A}	2–1	Hoogeveen _{A}
SVV _{1}	1–2	SC Heracles _{1}
TOP Oss _{A}	1–2	Willem II _{1}
SC Veendam _{1}	3–1	ACV _{A}
FC Vlaardingen _{1}	1–2	VV Noordwijk _{A}
VUC _{A}	2–3	FC Eindhoven _{1}
FC Wageningen _{1}	1–0	FC Groningen _{1}

Home team	Result	Away team
FC Den Bosch _{1}	5–2	VV Geldrop/AEK _{A}
FC Dordrecht _{1}	3–0	SC Amersfoort _{1}
Excelsior _{1}	2–0	SC Cambuur _{1}
Fortuna SC _{1}	2–1	HFC EDO _{A}
De Graafschap _{1}	4–1	Helmond Sport _{1}
sc Heerenveen _{1}	1–0	Telstar _{1}
Jodan Boys _{A}	0–10	FC Amsterdam _{1}

_{1} Eerste Divisie; _{A} Amateur teams

== Second round ==
The matches of the second round were played on 14, 15 and 25 October 1978. The Eredivisie clubs entered the tournament this round.

Home team	Result	Away team
FC Volendam _{E}	2–1	Feyenoord _{E}
FC Wageningen	4–0	FC Amsterdam
Willem II	1–2	Roda JC _{E}
FC Den Haag _{E}	4–2	NEC _{E}
NAC _{E}	2–1	Go Ahead Eagles _{E}
PEC Zwolle _{E}	4–1	MVV _{E}
FC Twente _{E}	4–1	SC Veendam
FC Utrecht _{E}	2–0	sc Heerenveen

Home team	Result	Away team
Ajax _{E}	3–2	FC Eindhoven
Excelsior	1–2	AZ'67 _{E}
Fortuna SC	4–3	VV Rheden
De Graafschap	2–1 (aet)	Vitesse Arnhem _{E}
HFC Haarlem _{E}	2–2 (p)	VV Noordwijk
SC Heracles	0–1	FC Den Bosch
PSV _{E}	11–1	FC Dordrecht
Sparta _{E}	4–1	FC VVV _{E}

_{E} Eredivisie

== Round of 16 ==
The matches were played on 18 and 19 November 1978.

Home team	Result	Away team
Ajax	3–0	Roda JC
AZ'67	4–1	FC Wageningen
FC Den Haag	2–2 (p)	FC Twente
Fortuna SC	2–0	De Graafschap
NAC	1–0	FC Utrecht
VV Noordwijk	1–3	FC Volendam
PSV	3–2	FC Den Bosch
Sparta	3–0	PEC Zwolle

== Quarter finals ==
The quarter finals were played on 14 March and 4 April 1979.

Team 1	Aggregate	Team 2	Match 1	Match 2
FC Twente	3–1	AZ'67	1–1	2–0
Fortuna SC	0–4	Ajax	0–2	0–2
NAC	2–3	PSV	1–1	1–2
FC Volendam	2–0	Sparta	0–0	2–0

== Semi-finals ==
The semi-finals were played on 18 April and 2 May 1979.

Team 1	Aggregate	Team 2	Match 1	Match 2
FC Twente	4–3	PSV	4–2	0–1
FC Volendam	4–4 (a)	Ajax	3–3	1–1

== Final ==
15 May 1979

Ajax	1–1 (a.e.t.)	FC Twente
Clarke 42' (pen.)		Meutstege 14' (o.g.)

De Kuip, Rotterdam
Attendance: 30,000
Referee: Gerard Jonker

=== Replay ===
29 May 1979

Ajax	3–0	FC Twente
Clarke 26'; Tahamata 47'; Schoenaker 64'

De Kuip, Rotterdam
Attendance: 29,000
Referee: Jan Keizer

Ajax also won the Dutch Eredivisie championship, thereby taking the double. They would participate in the European Cup, so finalists Twente could play in the Cup Winners' Cup.
