= 1978–79 Eerste Divisie =

23rd season of the second-tier football league in Netherlands

Eerste Divisie
- Season: 1978–79
- Champions: SBV Excelsior
- Promoted: SBV Excelsior; Willem II
- Goals: 937
- Average goals/game: 2.73

The Dutch Eerste Divisie in the 1978–79 season was contested by 19 teams. Excelsior won the championship.

== New entrants ==
Relegated from the 1977–78 Eredivisie

- FC Amsterdam
- Telstar

== League standings ==
Pos	Team	Pld	W	D	L	GF	GA	GD	Pts	Promotion or qualification
1	SBV Excelsior	36	22	7	7	76	32	+44	51	Promoted to Eredivisie.
2	FC Groningen	36	20	10	6	60	31	+29	50	Qualified for Promotion play-off as Period champions.
3	Willem II	36	17	14	5	60	32	+28	48	Qualified for Promotion play-off as Period champions.
4	Fortuna SC	36	17	13	6	64	35	+29	47	Qualified for Promotion play-off as Period champions.
5	FC Eindhoven	36	14	16	6	53	32	+21	44	
6	FC Wageningen	36	17	10	9	59	44	+15	44	
7	FC Den Bosch	36	16	10	10	58	43	+15	42	
8	De Graafschap	36	15	11	10	60	47	+13	41	
9	FC Amsterdam	36	13	11	12	52	40	+12	37	
10	Telstar	36	12	10	14	45	45	0	34	Qualified for Promotion play-off as Period champions.
11	sc Heerenveen	36	10	13	13	34	47	−13	33	
12	SC Veendam	36	13	6	17	51	67	−16	32	
13	SC Heracles	36	10	11	15	46	49	−3	31	
14	SVV	36	11	9	16	42	48	−6	31	
15	SC Cambuur	36	9	10	17	33	54	−21	28	
16	FC Vlaardingen	36	7	12	17	35	54	−19	26	
17	Helmond Sport	36	9	8	19	42	71	−29	26	
18	SC Amersfoort	36	8	7	21	34	78	−44	23	
19	FC Dordrecht	36	5	6	25	33	88	−55	16	Changed name to DS '79 for next season.

Source: rsssf.com

== Promotion competition ==
In the promotion competition, four period winners (the best teams during each of the four quarters of the regular competition) played for promotion to the Eredivisie.

Pos	Team	Pld	W	D	L	GF	GA	GD	Pts	Promotion
1	Willem II	6	3	2	1	9	5	+4	8	Promoted to Eredivisie.
2	Fortuna SC	6	3	2	1	7	4	+3	8	Changed name to Fortuna Sittard for next season.
3	FC Groningen	6	2	2	2	6	6	0	6	
4	Telstar	6	1	0	5	5	12	−7	2	

Source: rsssf.com

== Attendances ==
#	Club	Average
1	Groningen	8,283
2	Fortuna	4,989
3	Willem II	4,467
4	De Graafschap	4,344
5	Den Bosch	4,244
6	Wageningen	3,861
7	Eindhoven	3,417
8	Veendam	3,272
9	Heracles	3,206
10	Excelsior	3,122
11	Heerenveen	3,089
12	Cambuur	2,947
13	Helmond	2,517
14	Amersfoort	1,841
15	Telstar	1,556
16	SVV	1,503
17	Dordrecht	1,383
18	Vlaardingen	1,031
19	Amsterdam	870

== See also ==
- 1978–79 Eredivisie
- 1978–79 KNVB Cup
