= 1970–71 Eerste Divisie =

15th season of the second-tier football league in Netherlands

Eerste Divisie
- Season: 1970–71
- Champions: FC Den Bosch
- Promoted: sc Heerenveen; FC Wageningen
- Relegated: None: disbandment Tweede Divisie
- From Eredivisie: GVAV; SVV
- To Eredivisie: FC Den Bosch; GVAV; Vitesse Arnhem
- Goals: 576
- Average goals/game: 2.40

The Dutch Eerste Divisie in the 1970–71 season was contested by 16 teams. FC Den Bosch won the championship. Due to the disbandment of the Tweede Divisie at the end of this season, there was no relegation.

== New entrants ==
Promoted from the 1969–70 Tweede Divisie:

- sc Heerenveen
- FC Wageningen

Relegated from the 1969–70 Eredivisie:

- GVAV
- SVV

== League standings ==
Pos	Team	Pld	W	D	L	GF	GA	GD	Pts	Promotion
1	FC Den Bosch	30	18	10	2	50	18	+32	46	Promoted to Eredivisie.
2	GVAV	30	16	11	3	38	7	+31	43	Promoted to Eredivisie.
3	Vitesse Arnhem	30	16	6	8	54	31	+23	38	Promoted to Eredivisie.
4	SC Cambuur	30	13	10	7	43	34	+9	36	
5	Blauw-Wit Amsterdam	30	12	7	11	44	39	+5	31	
6	Heracles	30	10	11	9	42	40	+2	31	
7	HVC	30	10	10	10	31	39	−8	30	
8	FC Wageningen	30	9	11	10	42	49	−7	29	
9	sc Heerenveen	30	7	14	9	36	37	−1	28	
10	Fortuna SC	30	9	8	13	25	33	−8	26	
11	DFC	30	9	7	14	31	42	−11	25	
12	Helmond Sport	30	5	14	11	23	32	−9	24	
13	Veendam	30	7	10	13	28	38	−10	24	
14	Willem II	30	8	8	14	27	49	−22	24	
15	SVV	30	5	13	12	34	46	−12	23	
16	De Graafschap	30	7	8	15	28	42	−14	22	

Source: rsssf.com

== Attendances ==
#	Club	Average
1	GVAV	10,600
2	Den Bosch	8,467
3	Vitesse	5,560
4	Cambuur	5,167
5	De Graafschap	4,800
6	Heerenveen	4,187
7	Veendam	4,000
8	Wageningen	3,933
9	Willem II	3,900
10	Heracles	3,467
11	Helmond	3,347
12	SVV	3,300
13	Fortuna	2,967
14	Blauw-Wit	2,947
15	DFC	2,547
16	HVC	2,453

== See also ==
- 1970–71 Eredivisie
- 1970–71 Tweede Divisie
- 1970–71 KNVB Cup
