= 1977–78 KNVB Cup =

Tournament details
- Country: Netherlands
- Teams: 46

Final positions
- Champions: AZ'67
- Runners-up: Ajax

The 1977-78 KNVB Cup 60th edition of the Dutch national football annual knockout tournament for the KNVB Cup. 46 teams contested, beginning on 8 October 1977 and ending at the final on 5 May 1978.

FC Twente unsuccessfully defended its 1977 title at the Second round losing to Go Ahead Eagles, 2–1 (aet. AZ'67 from Alkmaar (at the time called AZ'67) successfully pursued on 5 May 1978 in Olympisch Stadion, Amsterdam its first KNVB Cup losing to Ajax, 1–0. 50,000 attended. AZ'67 contested in the Cup Winners' cup

During the quarter and semi-finals, two-legged matches were played.

== Teams ==
- All 18 participants of the Eredivisie 1977-78, entering in the second round
- All 19 participants of the Eerste Divisie 1977-78
- 9 teams from lower (amateur) leagues

== First round ==
The matches of the first round were played on 8-9 October 1977.

Home team	Result	Away team
PEC Zwolle _{1}	1–1 (p)	FC Eindhoven _{1}
SC Cambuur _{1}	2–0	FC Den Bosch _{1}
SVV _{1}	(p) 3-3	BSV Limburgia _{A}
SC Veendam _{1}	5–2	Helmond Sport _{1}
FC Wageningen _{1}	1–0	SC Amersfoort _{1}
Willem II _{1}	1–2	VV DWV _{A}
IJsselmeervogels _{A}	2–1	sc Heerenveen _{1}

Home team	Result	Away team
VV DOVO _{A}	2–1	RKAV Volendam _{A}
Excelsior _{1}	5–0	VV Rheden _{A}
FC Dordrecht _{1}	0–1	SC BVV _{A}
FC Groningen _{1}	2–0	HFC EDO _{A}
FC Vlaardingen _{1}	3–0	Enschedese Boys _{A}
Fortuna Sittard _{1}	3–2 (aet)	De Graafschap _{1}
SC Heracles _{1}	1–0	MVV _{1}

_{1} Eerste Divisie; _{A} Amateur teams

== Second round ==
The matches of the second round were played on November 19 and 20, 1977. The Eredivisie clubs entered the tournament here.

Home team	Result	Away team
HFC Haarlem _{E}	1–0	NEC _{E}
PSV _{E}	6–0	SVV
Sparta _{E}	5–0	SC Heracles
Vitesse Arnhem _{E}	3–0	FC Den Haag _{E}
FC Volendam _{E}	3–3 (p)	FC Utrecht _{E}
FC Wageningen	2–0 (aet)	FC VVV _{E}
IJsselmeervogels	1–3	FC Groningen
AZ'67 _{E}	2–0	Fortuna Sittard (on December 14)

Home team	Result	Away team
Ajax _{E}	4–1	Telstar _{E}
VV DOVO	0–3	SC Veendam
VV DWV	0–1 (aet)	Roda JC _{E}
FC Eindhoven	3–1 (aet)	SC Cambuur
Excelsior	3–2	NAC _{E}
FC Vlaardingen	0–3	FC Amsterdam _{E}
Feyenoord _{E}	3–0	SC BVV
Go Ahead Eagles _{E}	2–1 (aet)	FC Twente _{E}

_{E} Eredivisie

== Round of 16 ==
The matches of the round of 16 were played between December 21 and 26, 1977.

Home team	Result	Away team
Ajax	7–0	FC Eindhoven
AZ'67	1–0	FC Amsterdam
Excelsior	2–1	FC Groningen
PSV	1–6	FC Wageningen
Roda JC	1–0	HFC Haarlem
Sparta	1–0	Go Ahead Eagles
SC Veendam	2–1	Feyenoord
Vitesse Arnhem	4–3 (aet)	FC Utrecht

== Quarter finals ==
The quarter finals were played between February 1 and March 15, 1978.

Team 1	Aggregate	Team 2	Match 1	Match 2
Roda JC	1–4	Ajax	0–3	1–1
SC Veendam	2–4	Excelsior	2–1	0–3
Vitesse Arnhem	0–4	Sparta	0–2	0–2
FC Wageningen	1–3	AZ'67	1–2	0–1

== Semi-finals ==
The semi-finals were played on March 30 and April 19, 1978.

Team 1	Aggregate	Team 2	Match 1	Match 2
Excelsior	1–5	AZ'67	1–2	0–3
Sparta	2–3	Ajax	2–1	0–2

== Final ==
5 May 1978

AZ'67	1–0	Ajax
van Rijnsoever 58'

Olympisch Stadion, Amsterdam
Attendance: 50,000
Referee: Siem Wellinga

AZ contested in the Cup Winners' cup
