= 1966–67 Eerste Divisie =

11th season of the second-tier football league in Netherlands

Eerste Divisie
- Season: 1966–67
- Champions: FC Volendam
- Promoted: FC Den Bosch; DFC; SC Drente; De Graafschap; RCH; SVV; Vitesse Arnhem; FC Zaanstreek
- Relegated: De Graafschap; SC Drente
- From Eredivisie: Heracles
- To Eredivisie: FC Volendam; NEC
- Goals scored: 1,074
- Average goals/game: 2.82

The Dutch Eerste Divisie in the 1966–67 season was contested by 20 teams. Since there were only fifteen teams in the previous season, several new teams entered the competition. FC Volendam won the championship.

== New entrants ==
Promoted from the 1965–66 Tweede Divisie:

- FC Den Bosch
- DFC
- SC Drente (Promoted as Zwartemeer)
- De Graafschap
- Racing Club Heemstede
- SVV
- Vitesse Arnhem
- FC Zaanstreek

Relegated from the 1965–66 Eredivisie:

- Heracles

== League standings ==
| Pos | Team | Pld | W | D | L | GF | GA | GD | Pts | Promotion or relegation |
|---|---|---|---|---|---|---|---|---|---|---|
| 1 | FC Volendam | 38 | 20 | 12 | 6 | 90 | 49 | +41 | 52 | Promotion to Eredivisie |
| 2 | NEC | 38 | 20 | 10 | 8 | 63 | 36 | +27 | 50 | Promotion to Eredivisie |
| 3 | Holland Sport | 38 | 21 | 7 | 10 | 66 | 32 | +34 | 49 | |
| 4 | SC Cambuur | 38 | 17 | 13 | 8 | 59 | 41 | +18 | 47 | |
| 5 | FC Den Bosch | 38 | 16 | 12 | 10 | 64 | 44 | +20 | 44 | |
| 6 | Heracles | 38 | 14 | 16 | 8 | 53 | 44 | +9 | 44 | |
| 7 | FC Zaanstreek | 38 | 17 | 9 | 12 | 54 | 48 | +6 | 43 | Merged with Alkmaar '54 to form AZ'67 |
| 8 | Vitesse Arnhem | 38 | 14 | 14 | 10 | 66 | 56 | +10 | 42 | |
| 9 | FC Eindhoven | 38 | 17 | 8 | 13 | 54 | 47 | +7 | 42 | |
| 10 | Blauw-Wit Amsterdam | 38 | 14 | 12 | 12 | 43 | 35 | +8 | 40 | |
| 11 | DFC | 38 | 14 | 12 | 12 | 63 | 56 | +7 | 40 | |
| 12 | Alkmaar '54 | 38 | 18 | 2 | 18 | 55 | 55 | 0 | 38 | Merged with FC Zaanstreek to form AZ'67 |
| 13 | Racing Club Heemstede | 38 | 11 | 11 | 16 | 44 | 54 | −10 | 33 | |
| 14 | RBC Roosendaal | 38 | 14 | 4 | 20 | 53 | 71 | −18 | 32 | |
| 15 | SVV | 38 | 10 | 12 | 16 | 50 | 67 | −17 | 32 | |
| 16 | Velox | 38 | 9 | 11 | 18 | 40 | 61 | −21 | 29 | |
| 17 | De Volewijckers | 38 | 10 | 9 | 19 | 45 | 69 | −24 | 29 | |
| 18 | De Graafschap | 38 | 11 | 6 | 21 | 41 | 61 | −20 | 28 | Relegated to Tweede Divisie. |
| 19 | DHC '66 | 38 | 7 | 9 | 22 | 36 | 75 | −39 | 23 | Merged with Xerxes to form Xerxes/DHC. |
| 20 | SC Drente | 38 | 5 | 13 | 20 | 35 | 73 | −38 | 23 | Relegated to Tweede Divisie. |

Source: rsssf.com

== See also ==
- 1966–67 Eredivisie
- 1966–67 Tweede Divisie
