= 1981–82 KNVB Cup =

Tournament details
- Country: Netherlands
- Teams: 46

Final positions
- Champions: AZ'67
- Runners-up: FC Utrecht

The 1981-82 KNVB Cup was the 64th edition of the Dutch national football annual knockout tournament for the KNVB Cup. 46 teams contested, beginning on 5 September 1981 and ending with the two legs of the final on 12 and 18 May 1982.

AZ from Alkmaar (at the time called AZ'67) beating FC Utrecht 5–2 on aggregate and won the cup for the third time. From the quarter finals onwards,

two-legged matches were held.

== Teams ==
- All 18 participants of the Eredivisie 1981-82, entering in the second round
- All 18 participants of the Eerste Divisie 1981-82
- 10 teams from lower (amateur) leagues

== First round ==
The matches of the first round were played on 5-6 September 1981.

Home team	Result	Away team
SC Amersfoort _{1}	1–0 (aet)	FC Wageningen _{1}
SVV _{1}	3–4	SC Cambuur _{1}
Telstar _{1}	6–2	RKC _{A}
De Treffers _{A}	1–5	FC Den Bosch _{1}
GVV Unitas _{A}	0–3	DS '79 _{1}
SC Veendam _{1}	2–0	VV Noordwijk _{A}
Vitesse Arnhem _{1}	2–0	Helmond Sport _{1}

Home team	Result	Away team
VV Appingedam _{A}	1–6	Excelsior _{1}
DHC Delft _{A}	2–0	Fortuna Sittard _{1}
FC Eindhoven _{1}	0–1	FC Volendam _{1}
FC Amsterdam _{1}	6–3 (aet)	DOS Kampen _{A}
FC VVV _{1}	1–0	VV Caesar _{A}
sc Heerenveen _{1}	3–2	ACV _{A}
RBC _{A}	1–3	Heracles _{1}

_{1} Eerste Divisie; _{A} Amateur teams

== Second round ==
The matches of the second round were played on October 31 and November 1, 1981. The Eredivisie clubs entered the tournament this round.

Home team	Result	Away team
Heracles	4–1	sc Heerenveen
MVV _{E}	10–3	SC Amersfoort
NEC _{E}	4–3 (aet)	Go Ahead Eagles _{E}
PEC Zwolle _{E}	3–2	FC Groningen _{E}
PSV _{E}	6–0	Telstar
Sparta _{E}	4–2	FC Volendam
SC Veendam	2–5	AZ'67 _{E}
Vitesse Arnhem	1–3	Feyenoord _{E}

Home team	Result	Away team
SC Cambuur	0–2	DS '79
DHC Delft	2–3	Ajax _{E}
Excelsior	2–1	Willem II _{E}
FC Amsterdam	0–3	FC Den Bosch
FC Twente _{E}	5–1	FC VVV
FC Utrecht _{E}	2–0	FC Den Haag _{E}
De Graafschap _{E}	0–2	NAC _{E}
HFC Haarlem _{E}	1–0	Roda JC _{E}

_{E} Eredivisie

== Round of 16 ==
The matches of the round of 16 were played on January 16 and 17, 1982.

Home team	Result	Away team
DS '79	1–0	Ajax
FC Den Bosch	3–4 (aet)	Heracles
HFC Haarlem	1–0	Excelsior
NEC	3–1	MVV
Sparta	3–1 (aet)	NAC
AZ'67	2–0	PSV (on Jan. 27)
FC Twente	1–2	FC Utrecht (on Feb. 3)
PEC Zwolle	1–0	Feyenoord (on Feb. 3)

== Quarter finals ==
The quarter finals were played on February 17 and March 17, 1982.

Team 1	Aggregate	Team 2	Match 1	Match 2
AZ'67	9–3	PEC Zwolle	6–1	3–2
DS '79	2–4	FC Utrecht	1–1	1–3
Heracles	3–5	Sparta	3–1	0–4
NEC	0–4	HFC Haarlem	0–4	0–0

== Semi-finals ==
The semi-finals were played on March 31 and April 28, 1982.

Team 1	Aggregate	Team 2	Match 1	Match 2
HFC Haarlem	0–2	FC Utrecht	0–0	0–2
Sparta	1–3	AZ'67	1–2	0–1

== Final ==
12 May 1982

FC Utrecht	1–0	AZ '67
Wouters 4'

Veemarktterrein, Utrecht
Attendance: 10,000
Referee: Bep Thomas

18 May 1982

AZ '67	5–1	FC Utrecht
Oberacher 18'; Kist 46', 57' (pen.), 76'; Tol 77'		Carbo 27'

Alkmaarderhout, Alkmaar
Attendance: 12,000
Referee: Henk Weerink

AZ would participate in the Cup Winners' Cup.
