= 1997–98 Eredivisie =

42nd season of the Eredivisie

Eredivisie
- Season: 1997–98
- Dates: 19 August 1997 – 10 May 1998
- Champions: Ajax (27th title)
- Promoted: MVV
- Relegated: FC Groningen; FC Volendam
- Champions League: Ajax; PSV
- Cup Winners' Cup: SC Heerenveen
- UEFA Cup: Vitesse Arnhem; Feyenoord; Willem II
- Intertoto Cup: Fortuna Sittard; FC Twente
- Goals: 1,002
- Average goals/game: 3.27
- Top goalscorer: (Greece) Nikos Machlas (34 goals)

The 1997–98 Eredivisie season was contested by 18 teams. Ajax won the championship.

== League standings ==
Pos	Team	Pld	W	D	L	GF	GA	GD	Pts	Qualification or relegation
1	Ajax (Note: Ajax also won the KNVB Cup, thereby taking the double. They would participate in the Champions League, just like finalists PSV. SC Heerenveen, the winner of the third place match, would play in the Cup Winners' Cup.) (C)	34	29	2	3	112	22	+90	89	Qualification to Champions League group stage
2	PSV	34	21	9	4	95	44	+51	72	Qualification to Champions League second qualifying round
3	Vitesse Arnhem	34	21	7	6	85	48	+37	70	Qualification to UEFA Cup first round
4	Feyenoord	34	18	7	9	62	40	+22	61	Qualification to UEFA Cup first round
5	Willem II	34	17	4	13	66	58	+8	55	Qualification to UEFA Cup first round
6	SC Heerenveen	34	16	7	11	56	59	−3	55	Qualification to Cup Winners' Cup first round
7	Fortuna Sittard	34	14	6	14	51	53	−2	48	Qualification to Intertoto Cup third round
8	NEC	34	14	2	18	40	57	−17	44	
9	FC Twente	34	11	10	13	41	42	−1	43	Qualification to Intertoto Cup second round
10	FC Utrecht	34	13	4	17	56	64	−8	43	
11	De Graafschap	34	11	9	14	45	49	−4	42	
12	NAC	34	12	6	16	41	49	−8	42	
13	Sparta	34	10	11	13	50	59	−9	41	
14	Roda JC	34	10	8	16	44	45	−1	38	
15	MVV	34	9	5	20	35	75	−40	32	
16	RKC Waalwijk	34	8	7	19	48	71	−23	31	Qualification to Relegation play-offs
17	FC Groningen (R)	34	7	10	17	42	65	−23	31	Qualification to Relegation play-offs
18	FC Volendam (R)	34	5	6	23	33	102	−69	21	Relegation to Eerste Divisie

Source: rsssf.com
(C) Champions; (R) Relegated

== Results ==
Home \ Away	AJA	FEY	FOR	GRA	GRO	HEE	MVV	NAC	NEC	PSV	RKC	ROD	SPA	TWE	UTR	VIT	VOL	WIL
Ajax	—	4–0	2–0	1–0	4–1	7–2	7–0	1–0	3–0	3–4	3–0	1–0	4–0	1–0	1–2	5–0	6–1	6–1
Feyenoord	0–1	—	1–3	2–0	3–0	2–0	2–1	2–1	0–2	1–1	2–1	1–0	3–1	2–2	3–1	5–1	5–0	4–2
Fortuna Sittard	0–5	0–2	—	1–0	4–1	3–1	4–1	4–1	0–2	1–2	0–3	1–1	2–1	1–0	3–1	1–7	3–0	2–1
De Graafschap	1–8	0–0	1–0	—	2–3	1–2	1–2	0–1	3–2	1–2	1–0	2–0	2–2	2–1	0–1	3–3	2–1	3–1
Groningen	2–4	2–0	1–0	0–3	—	0–1	2–3	1–1	4–0	1–1	3–1	1–1	1–1	0–1	1–2	1–1	3–0	2–2
Heerenveen	0–1	0–0	2–2	0–0	1–1	—	3–1	3–1	0–3	1–1	3–2	3–1	1–1	2–1	1–0	3–2	3–1	1–3
MVV	0–3	0–3	1–4	2–1	1–0	1–2	—	0–1	2–0	2–1	1–1	1–2	2–2	2–2	0–0	1–3	4–1	1–0
NAC	0–2	1–3	3–1	2–0	0–0	0–2	2–0	—	0–1	3–3	4–0	1–0	1–2	1–0	2–1	1–3	4–1	0–2
NEC	1–4	3–2	2–2	0–4	0–2	0–1	2–1	2–0	—	0–4	2–1	2–1	2–0	1–2	1–0	0–2	4–1	0–3
PSV	1–1	3–3	3–2	0–0	6–2	3–1	5–0	5–1	2–1	—	5–1	2–0	4–2	3–0	4–1	3–2	10–0	3–0
RKC	1–5	3–2	1–2	4–1	1–1	1–1	1–1	1–0	0–0	0–1	—	3–3	1–3	5–1	3–1	0–1	1–1	1–4
Roda	1–1	1–2	0–0	1–2	4–1	0–2	3–0	0–0	4–0	2–2	1–2	—	2–0	2–0	1–0	1–1	0–2	0–1
Sparta Rotterdam	0–5	0–3	1–1	1–1	1–1	2–4	4–0	1–1	1–0	3–1	1–0	3–1	—	1–1	4–2	1–1	5–0	4–1
Twente	1–2	0–0	4–1	1–1	2–0	3–1	1–0	1–1	1–0	3–0	2–0	1–2	2–1	—	1–2	1–1	1–1	2–0
Utrecht	1–7	2–3	1–0	0–0	2–0	2–4	6–1	1–3	2–4	0–1	6–1	1–0	3–0	1–1	—	5–3	4–1	2–2
Vitesse	2–0	2–1	1–0	4–1	5–1	4–2	3–1	4–1	2–1	2–2	3–2	3–1	2–0	2–1	5–0	—	6–0	3–1
Volendam	0–3	0–0	0–3	0–5	3–1	4–1	1–2	0–3	2–0	0–6	3–4	1–4	1–1	0–0	0–1	1–1	—	4–1
Willem II	0–1	2–0	0–0	1–1	4–2	5–2	2–0	2–0	1–2	4–1	3–2	2–4	3–0	3–1	3–2	1–0	5–2	—

Legend: Blue = home team win; Yellow = draw; Red = away team win.

== Promotion/relegation play-offs ==
In the promotion/relegation competition, eight entrants (six from the Eerste Divisie and two from this league) entered in two groups. The group winners were promoted to (or remained in) the Eredivisie.

Group 1
Pos	Team	Pld	W	D	L	GF	GA	GD	Pts	Qualification
1	RKC Waalwijk	6	4	2	0	15	5	+10	14	Remain in Eredivisie
2	FC Eindhoven	6	1	3	2	8	11	−3	6	Remain in Eerste Divisie
3	ADO Den Haag	6	0	5	1	5	8	−3	5	Remain in Eerste Divisie
4	FC Emmen	6	0	4	2	11	15	−4	4	Remain in Eerste Divisie

Source: rsssf.com

Group 2
Pos	Team	Pld	W	D	L	GF	GA	GD	Pts	Promotion or relegation
1	Cambuur Leeuwarden	6	4	2	0	15	8	+7	14	Promotion to Eredivisie
2	FC Zwolle	6	2	2	2	8	9	−1	8	
3	FC Groningen	6	1	2	3	9	12	−3	5	Relegation to Eerste Divisie
4	FC Den Bosch	6	1	2	3	7	10	−3	5	

Source: rsssf.com

== Attendances ==
No.	Club	Average	Change	Highest
1	AFC Ajax	47,315	4,8%	50,499
2	PSV	27,721	-1,3%	29,500
3	Feyenoord	25,350	-5,7%	43,100
4	SBV Vitesse	13,787	92,7%	26,500
5	sc Heerenveen	13,574	2,6%	14,300
6	FC Groningen	12,848	2,3%	16,300
7	NAC Breda	12,702	2,6%	16,100
8	FC Utrecht	11,771	13,7%	14,000
9	Willem II	10,112	20,7%	14,500
10	FC Twente	8,447	10,8%	13,500
11	De Graafschap	8,035	-4,3%	10,500
12	Roda JC	7,366	-0,3%	11,570
13	MVV Maastricht	6,096	30,1%	10,000
14	Fortuna Sittard	5,976	16,5%	11,500
15	Sparta Rotterdam	5,409	14,4%	11,000
16	NEC	5,125	10,4%	13,500
17	RKC Waalwijk	4,401	3,1%	6,100
18	FC Volendam	3,818	-4,9%	6,667

== See also ==
- 1997–98 Eerste Divisie
- 1997–98 KNVB Cup
