= 1998–99 Eerste Divisie =

43rd season of the second-tier football league in Netherlands

Eerste Divisie
- Season: 1998–99
- Champions: FC Den Bosch
- Promoted: FC Den Bosch
- Goals: 1,007
- Average goals/game: 3.29

The Dutch Eerste Divisie in the 1998–99 season was contested by 18 teams. FC Den Bosch won the championship.

== New entrants ==
Relegated from the 1997–98 Eredivisie

- FC Groningen
- FC Volendam

== League standings ==
Pos	Team	Pld	W	D	L	GF	GA	GD	Pts	Promotion or qualification
1	FC Den Bosch	34	23	8	3	80	35	+45	77	Promotion to Eredivisie
2	FC Groningen	34	19	7	8	69	33	+36	64	Play-offs
3	FC Emmen	34	19	4	11	53	37	+16	61	Play-offs
4	Helmond Sport	34	16	7	11	55	52	+3	55	Play-offs
5	FC Zwolle	34	15	9	10	57	42	+15	54	Play-offs
6	SBV Excelsior	34	16	6	12	74	63	+11	54	Play-offs
7	Go Ahead Eagles	34	14	8	12	59	57	+2	50	
8	FC Volendam	34	14	7	13	63	66	−3	49	
9	FC Eindhoven	34	14	6	14	64	73	−9	48	
10	ADO Den Haag	34	12	9	13	52	52	0	45	
11	VVV-Venlo	34	12	6	16	59	66	−7	42	
12	RBC Roosendaal	34	11	7	16	54	65	−11	40	
13	Veendam	34	11	6	17	47	54	−7	39	
14	Dordrecht '90	34	11	5	18	51	66	−15	38	Play-offs
15	HFC Haarlem	34	9	11	14	45	67	−22	38	
16	TOP Oss	34	9	10	15	43	50	−7	37	
17	Heracles Almelo	34	9	7	18	37	58	−21	34	
18	Telstar	34	5	11	18	45	71	−26	26	

Source: rsssf.com

== Promotion/relegation play-offs ==
In the promotion/relegation competition, eight entrants (six from this league and two from the Eredivisie) entered in two groups. The group winners were promoted to the Eredivisie.

Group 1
Pos	Team	Pld	W	D	L	GF	GA	GD	Pts	Qualification
1	RKC Waalwijk	6	5	1	0	11	3	+8	16	Remain in Eredivisie
2	FC Zwolle	6	2	2	2	8	10	−2	8	
3	Dordrecht '90	6	2	1	3	12	13	−1	7	
4	FC Emmen	6	1	0	5	10	15	−5	3	

Source: rsssf.com

Group 2
Pos	Team	Pld	W	D	L	GF	GA	GD	Pts	Qualification
1	Sparta	6	5	0	1	19	6	+13	15	Remain in Eredivisie
2	FC Groningen	6	4	1	1	16	8	+8	13	
3	Excelsior	6	2	1	3	16	18	−2	7	
4	Helmond Sport	6	0	0	6	5	24	−19	0	

Source: rsssf.com

== Attendances ==
#	Club	Average
1	Groningen	7,709
2	Emmen	4,980
3	Veendam	4,245
4	Heracles	3,604
5	Go Ahead	3,536
6	Den Bosch	3,253
7	Volendam	3,100
8	Zwolle	2,935
9	Helmond	2,907
10	ADO	2,744
11	VVV	2,399
12	Oss	2,245
13	Eindhoven	2,013
14	RBC	1,810
15	Haarlem	1,763
16	Excelsior	1,717
17	Telstar	1,459
18	Dordrecht	1,312

== See also ==
- 1998–99 Eredivisie
- 1998–99 KNVB Cup
