= 1972–73 Eredivisie =

17th season of the Eredivisie

Eredivisie
- Season: 1972–73
- Champions: AFC Ajax (16th title)
- Promoted: HFC Haarlem; AZ '67
- Relegated: SBV Excelsior; FC Den Bosch
- European Cup: AFC Ajax
- Cup Winners' Cup: NAC
- UEFA Cup: Feijenoord; FC Twente
- Goals: 849
- Average goals/game: 2.77
- Top goalscorer: (Netherlands) Cas Janssens; NEC; (Netherlands) Willy Brokamp MVV 18 goals

The Eredivisie is a football league in the Netherlands. In the 1972–1973 season it was contested by 18 teams. Ajax won the championship.

== League standings ==
Pos	Team	Pld	W	D	L	GF	GA	GD	Pts	Qualification or relegation
1	AFC Ajax	34	30	0	4	102	18	+84	60	Qualified for 1973–74 European Cup
2	Feijenoord	34	27	4	3	89	28	+61	58	Qualified for 1973–74 UEFA Cup
3	FC Twente	34	22	6	6	53	22	+31	50	Qualified for 1973–74 UEFA Cup
4	Sparta Rotterdam	34	21	5	8	85	37	+48	47	
5	FC Den Haag	34	15	10	9	44	39	+5	40	
6	PSV Eindhoven	34	15	8	11	46	35	+11	38	
7	MVV Maastricht	34	14	9	11	49	38	+11	37	
8	FC Utrecht	34	12	8	14	42	55	−13	32	
9	NEC	34	10	11	13	40	46	−6	31	
10	FC Amsterdam	34	11	7	16	44	54	−10	29	
11	HFC Haarlem	34	10	9	15	43	55	−12	29	
12	Telstar	34	12	4	18	39	51	−12	28	
13	FC Groningen	34	7	13	14	37	61	−24	27	
14	Go Ahead Eagles	34	8	9	17	31	52	−21	25	
15	AZ '67	34	8	9	17	32	58	−26	25	
16	NAC	34	7	7	20	26	57	−31	21	Qualified for 1973–74 European Cup Winners' Cup
17	SBV Excelsior	34	5	8	21	24	70	−46	18	Relegated to Eerste Divisie
18	FC Den Bosch	34	5	7	22	23	73	−50	17	Relegated to Eerste Divisie

Source: rsssf.com

== Results ==
Home \ Away	AJA	AMS	AZ	DBO	EXC	FEY	GAE	GRO	DHA	HFC	MVV	NAC	NEC	PSV	SPA	TEL	TWE	UTR
Ajax		2–1	3–0	9–0	8–0	2–1	6–0	3–0	5–0	3–0	4–0	4–0	4–0	3–1	4–2	9–2	1–0	3–1
FC Amsterdam	1–2		0–3	3–2	4–0	1–3	0–1	0–1	0–2	2–1	2–0	0–0	1–1	1–1	4–2	2–0	1–1	2–1
AZ '67	0–5	1–4		0–0	3–1	0–2	1–1	1–1	0–1	2–1	2–1	2–2	0–0	2–1	1–0	0–0	2–2	2–2
FC Den Bosch '67	1–2	0–0	1–2		0–0	0–2	2–1	1–1	2–1	0–0	1–0	2–0	0–1	1–4	0–5	0–1	0–2	3–0
Excelsior	0–1	2–3	1–0	4–1		1–6	0–2	0–0	0–2	0–1	0–0	2–0	1–1	2–3	0–4	1–1	0–0	0–3
Feijenoord	2–0	7–2	2–1	4–0	7–0		2–1	5–1	2–0	1–0	2–1	3–1	1–0	2–0	3–3	2–0	1–3	2–1
Go Ahead Eagles	0–1	0–0	1–2	1–0	2–1	2–4		0–0	0–1	0–4	2–2	3–0	0–1	1–0	2–0	2–1	1–2	3–4
FC Groningen	0–2	4–0	4–2	4–2	1–1	1–4	1–1		1–2	4–1	1–4	1–0	1–1	1–1	1–4	0–2	0–3	2–1
FC Den Haag	0–1	1–1	4–0	0–0	1–1	3–2	2–0	3–0		3–0	1–1	1–1	1–0	3–0	1–1	1–0	0–4	1–1
Haarlem	0–4	1–4	2–0	2–1	2–0	0–0	5–2	1–1	0–0		3–2	3–1	1–1	1–1	0–4	1–2	4–0	0–2
MVV	1–0	0–3	1–0	1–1	3–0	1–2	1–1	3–0	4–1	2–0		3–0	2–0	0–1	3–2	4–0	1–0	2–0
NAC	2–0	1–0	3–0	4–0	2–1	0–5	0–0	1–1	1–2	1–1	1–1		1–0	1–2	0–1	0–1	0–1	0–3
N.E.C.	0–4	1–0	3–2	7–0	2–1	2–3	1–1	1–1	1–3	2–1	0–0	0–2		1–1	3–3	2–0	2–0	3–0
PSV	0–3	2–0	1–0	3–0	2–0	0–1	0–0	0–0	0–0	2–1	1–3	5–0	2–0		2–1	3–0	0–1	5–1
Sparta	3–1	5–0	4–1	3–1	0–1	1–1	1–0	2–0	3–1	4–1	4–0	2–0	2–2	3–0		2–1	1–2	6–0
Telstar	0–1	2–1	0–0	3–1	1–3	0–1	3–0	5–1	4–1	2–3	2–1	2–0	3–1	0–1	0–1		0–2	0–1
FC Twente '65	0–1	2–1	2–0	2–0	2–0	0–0	3–0	4–2	2–0	1–1	0–0	2–0	2–0	1–0	0–1	2–0		3–1
FC Utrecht	0–1	2–0	2–0	1–0	2–0	0–4	1–0	0–0	1–1	1–1	1–1	3–1	2–0	1–1	1–5	1–1	1–2	

Source: rsssf.com
Legend: Blue = home team win; Yellow = draw; Red = away team win.

== Attendances ==
#	Club	Average	Change
1	Feijenoord	34,118	−23.2
2	Ajax	23,588	+17.6
3	Sparta	12,441	+12.8
4	PSV	12,206	−11.7
5	Twente	11,324	−20.0
6	Utrecht	10,235	−29.4
7	Den Haag	10,235	−14.9
8	MVV	9,976	+25.2
9	AZ	8,971	+42.4
10	Den Bosch	8,941	−27.4
11	Go Ahead Eagles	8,647	−20.3
12	NEC	8,206	−32.3
13	NAC	7,853	−8.9
14	Groningen	7,647	−15.9
15	Haarlem	7,441	+15.8
16	Amsterdam	7,429	+12.3
17	Telstar	7,029	−4.0
18	Excelsior	4,765	−30.8

== See also ==
- 1972–73 Eerste Divisie
- 1972–73 KNVB Cup
