= Louis Coolen =

Dutch footballer (born 1952)

Personal information
- Date of birth: 12 January 1952 (age 74)
- Place of birth: Nuenen, Netherlands
- Position: Midfielder

Youth career
- Nuenen
- PSV

Senior career*
Years	Team	Apps	(Gls)
1975–1980	Helmond Sport	53	(1)
1980–1982	Nuenen		

Managerial career
- 1982–1985: Nuenen
- 1985–1987: Helmondia '55
- 1992–1996: UDI '19
- 1996–2001: Helmond Sport
- 2001–2005: Roda JC (assistant)
- 2005–2007: Eindhoven
- 2008: UDI '19
- * Club domestic league appearances and goals

Louis Coolen (born 12 January 1952) is a Dutch former football player and coach.

== Playing career ==
Coolen was born in Nuenen. A midfielder, during his playing career he played for PSV, Helmond Sport and RKSV Nuenen.

== Coaching career ==
After retiring as a player in 1982, Coolen has managed RKSV Nuenen, Helmondia '55, UDI '19, Helmond Sport and FC Eindhoven. He also was assistant manager at Roda JC for four years.

He moved abroad in September 2008 to become technical director at the Yuri Konoplev Academy in Tolyatti and worked at Russian giants Zenit Saint Petersburg, where he managed their youth coaches in two spells at the club. In between he worked for Roda as technical director and later led the Roda JC academy.

He returned to Helmond Sport in an advisory role in March 2017, but was deemed surplus to requirements in December 2022 when Jurgen Streppel was named technical manager. He then joined the academy set-up at Willem II.
