= 1997–98 Eerste Divisie =

42nd season of the second-tier football league in Netherlands

Eerste Divisie
- Season: 1997–98
- Champions: AZ
- Promoted: AZ; Cambuur Leeuw.
- Goals: 965
- Average goals/game: 3.15

The Dutch Eerste Divisie in the 1997–98 season was contested by 18 teams. AZ won the championship.

== New entrants ==
Relegated from the 1996–97 Eredivisie

- AZ

== League standings ==
Pos	Team	Pld	W	D	L	GF	GA	GD	Pts	Promotion or qualification
1	AZ	34	21	9	4	81	31	+50	72	Promotion to Eredivisie
2	Cambuur Leeuwarden	34	20	5	9	66	43	+23	65	Play-offs
3	FC Emmen	34	18	7	9	64	45	+19	61	Play-offs
4	FC Den Bosch	34	17	9	8	60	42	+18	60	Play-offs
5	ADO Den Haag	34	17	7	10	69	43	+26	58	Play-offs
6	FC Zwolle	34	14	12	8	58	42	+16	54	Play-offs
7	TOP Oss	34	16	4	14	59	50	+9	52	
8	FC Eindhoven	34	16	3	15	50	52	−2	51	Play-offs
9	Go Ahead Eagles	34	15	4	15	70	55	+15	49	
10	Helmond Sport	34	12	11	11	46	45	+1	47	
11	VVV-Venlo	34	12	11	11	45	46	−1	47	
12	Veendam	34	11	12	11	51	55	−4	45	
13	Telstar	34	11	7	16	43	60	−17	40	
14	SC Heracles	34	8	8	18	51	77	−26	32	
15	HFC Haarlem	34	8	7	19	43	85	−42	31	
16	Excelsior	34	8	6	20	39	64	−25	30	
17	Dordrecht '90	34	6	12	16	37	64	−27	30	
18	RBC Roosendaal	34	4	10	20	33	66	−33	22	

Source: rsssf.com

== Promotion/relegation play-offs ==
In the promotion/relegation competition, eight entrants (six from this league and two from the Eredivisie) entered in two groups. The group winners were promoted to the Eredivisie.

Group 1
Pos	Team	Pld	W	D	L	GF	GA	GD	Pts	Qualification
1	RKC Waalwijk	6	4	2	0	15	5	+10	14	Remain in Eredivisie
2	FC Eindhoven	6	1	3	2	8	11	−3	6	
3	ADO Den Haag	6	0	5	1	5	8	−3	5	
4	FC Emmen	6	0	4	2	11	15	−4	4	

Source: rsssf.com

Group 2
Pos	Team	Pld	W	D	L	GF	GA	GD	Pts	Promotion or relegation
1	Cambuur Leeuwarden	6	4	2	0	15	8	+7	14	Promotion to Eredivisie
2	FC Zwolle	6	2	2	2	8	9	−1	8	
3	FC Groningen	6	1	2	3	9	12	−3	5	Relegation from Eredivisie
4	FC Den Bosch	6	1	2	3	7	10	−3	5	

Source: rsssf.com

== Attendances ==
#	Club	Average
1	AZ	5,994
2	Emmen	5,178
3	Cambuur	5,153
4	Go Ahead	4,368
5	Veendam	3,687
6	ADO	3,314
7	Zwolle	3,300
8	Den Bosch	2,555
9	Eindhoven	2,509
10	Oss	2,257
11	Heracles	2,035
12	VVV	1,822
13	Helmond	1,818
14	Haarlem	1,706
15	RBC	1,588
16	Excelsior	1,533
17	Telstar	1,371
18	Dordrecht	1,274

== See also ==
- 1997–98 Eredivisie
- 1997–98 KNVB Cup
