= Helmond Sport =

Association football club in the Netherlands

- Full name: Helmond Sport
- Nicknames: Kattenmeppers (Cat Beaters); Onze Club (Our Club)
- Founded: 27 July 1967; 59 years ago
- Ground: GS Staalwerken Stadion
- Capacity: 3,600
- Chairman: Philippe van Esch
- Head coach: Frédéric Frans
- League: Eerste Divisie
- 2025–26: Eerste Divisie, 18th of 20
- Website: helmondsport.nl
| Home colours | Away colours | Third colours |

Helmond Sport (Dutch pronunciation: [ˈɦɛlmɔnt ˈspɔrt]) is a Dutch professional football club based in Helmond, North Brabant.

Founded in 1967 following the acquisition of the professional license of RKSV Helmondia '55, the club achieved promotion to the top-tier Eredivisie in 1982. After two seasons in the Eredivisie, Helmond Sport was relegated and has since remained a consistent presence in the second-tier Eerste Divisie. The club's most notable achievement came in the 1984–85 KNVB Cup, where they finished as runners-up after a narrow defeat to FC Utrecht in the final.

Helmond Sport has played its home matches at GS Staalwerken Stadion since 2025.

== History ==
Helmond Sport was established on 27 June 1967 following the acquisition of the professional license of RKSV Helmondia '55, ensuring that professional football would remain in the city of Helmond. The club began in the Tweede Divisie and, after a single season, earned promotion to the Eerste Divisie by defeating Fortuna Vlaardingen in a decisive play-off match.

In its early years, Helmond Sport struggled to make a significant impact in the Eerste Divisie, achieving only three top-ten finishes in its first 13 seasons. A breakthrough came in the 1981–82 season, when the club won its first period title and went on to secure the Eerste Divisie championship. This success earned Helmond Sport promotion to the top-tier Eredivisie for the first time. The club narrowly avoided relegation in its debut top-flight season but was relegated the following year.

One of the club's most notable achievements occurred in 1985, when Helmond Sport reached the KNVB Cup final. After defeating FC Wageningen over two legs in the semi-finals, the team faced FC Utrecht in the final. The match, played in Utrecht due to financial considerations, ended in a 1–0 defeat for Helmond Sport after John van Loen scored in the final minute.

From 1985 through the late 1990s, Helmond Sport remained a consistent presence in the Eerste Divisie, though it seldom challenged for promotion. The 1998–99 season marked a resurgence, with the team finishing fourth and claiming a period title. Another strong campaign followed in 2003, when the club finished third. Despite reaching the promotion play-off finals in 2003, 2005, 2011, and 2012, Helmond Sport was unable to secure a return to the Eredivisie.

Between 2008 and 2013, the club enjoyed a period of consistent success, finishing in the upper half of the table each season. This run ended in 2014, when Helmond Sport finished 13th. The following seasons were marked by disappointing performances, with the team failing to qualify for the play-offs between 2014 and 2016. Improvement came in the 2016–17 season under new head coach Roy Hendriksen, as the team secured a spot in the promotion play-offs by finishing second in the second period.

Despite these sporadic successes, Helmond Sport has not returned to the Eredivisie since its relegation in 1984.

== Honours ==
- KNVB Cup
  - Runners-up: 1985
- Eerste Divisie
  - Winner: 1982
- Promoted to Eerste Divisie
  - Promotion: 1968

== Domestic results ==
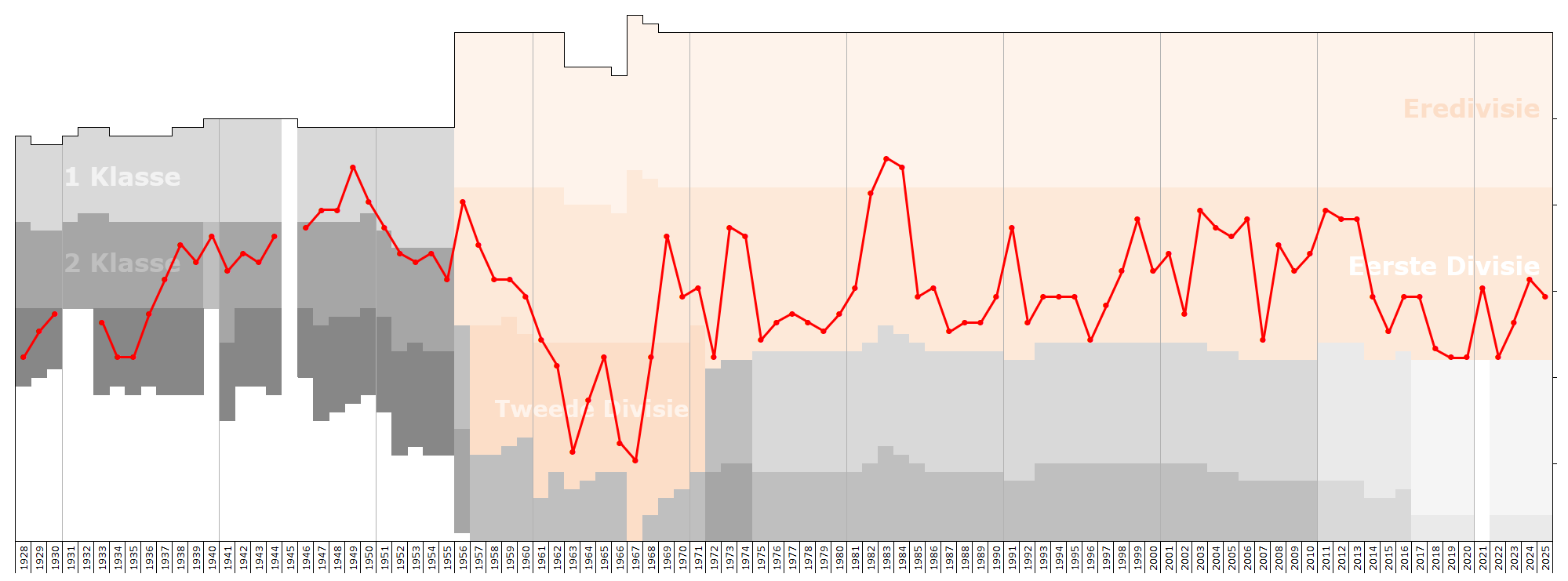
Historical chart of league performance

Below is a table with Helmond Sport's domestic results since the introduction of professional football in 1956.

Domestic Results since 1956
| Domestic league | League result | Qualification to | KNVB Cup season | Cup result |
|---|---|---|---|---|
| 2025–26 Eerste Divisie | 18th | – | 2025–26 | first round |
| 2024–25 Eerste Divisie | 13th | – | 2024–25 | first round |
| 2023–24 Eerste Divisie | 11th | – | 2023–24 | first round |
| 2022–23 Eerste Divisie | 16th | – | 2022–23 | first round |
| 2021–22 Eerste Divisie | 20th | – | 2021–22 | first round |
| 2020–21 Eerste Divisie | 12th | – | 2020–21 | first round |
| 2019–20 Eerste Divisie | 20th | – | 2019–20 | first round |
| 2018–19 Eerste Divisie | 20th | – | 2018–19 | first round |
| 2017–18 Eerste Divisie | 19th | – | 2017–18 | first round |
| 2016–17 Eerste Divisie | 13th | – | 2016–17 | first round |
| 2015–16 Eerste Divisie | 13th | – | 2015–16 | third round |
| 2014–15 Eerste Divisie | 17th | – | 2014–15 | second round |
| 2013–14 Eerste Divisie | 13th | – | 2013–14 | second round |
| 2012–13 Eerste Divisie | 4th | promotion/relegation play-off: no promotion | 2012–13 | second round |
| 2011–12 Eerste Divisie | 4th | promotion/relegation play-off: no promotion | 2011–12 | second round |
| 2010–11 Eerste Divisie | 3rd | promotion/relegation play-off: no promotion | 2010–11 | third round |
| 2009–10 Eerste Divisie | 8th | promotion/relegation play-off: no promotion | 2009–10 | round of 16 |
| 2008–09 Eerste Divisie | 10th | – | 2008–09 | second round |
| 2007–08 Eerste Divisie | 7th | promotion/relegation play-off: no promotion | 2007–08 | second round |
| 2006–07 Eerste Divisie | 18th | – | 2006–07 | second round |
| 2005–06 Eerste Divisie | 4th | promotion/relegation play-off: no promotion | 2005–06 | quarter-final |
| 2004–05 Eerste Divisie | 6th | promotion/relegation play-off: no promotion | 2004–05 | third round |
| 2003–04 Eerste Divisie | 5th | promotion/relegation play-off: no promotion | 2003–04 | first round |
| 2002–03 Eerste Divisie | 3rd | promotion/relegation play-off: no promotion | 2002–03 | second round |
| 2001–02 Eerste Divisie | 15th | – | 2001–02 | group stage |
| 2000–01 Eerste Divisie | 8th | – | 2000–01 | third round |
| 1999–2000 Eerste Divisie | 10th | – | 1999–00 | round of 16 |
| 1998–99 Eerste Divisie | 4th | promotion/relegation play-off: no promotion | 1998–99 | group stage |
| 1997–98 Eerste Divisie | 10th | – | 1997–98 | round of 16 |
| 1996–97 Eerste Divisie | 14th | – | 1996–97 | semi-final |
| 1995–96 Eerste Divisie | 18th | – | 1995–96 | round of 16 |
| 1994–95 Eerste Divisie | 13th | – | 1994–95 | second round |
| 1993–94 Eerste Divisie | 13th | – | 1993–94 | quarter-final |
| 1992–93 Eerste Divisie | 13th | – | 1992–93 | third round |
| 1991–92 Eerste Divisie | 16th | – | 1991–92 | third round |
| 1990–91 Eerste Divisie | 5th | – | 1990–91 | first round |
| 1989–90 Eerste Divisie | 13th | – | 1989–90 | second round |
| 1988–89 Eerste Divisie | 16th | – | 1988–89 | second round |
| 1987–88 Eerste Divisie | 16th | – | 1987–88 | first round |
| 1986–87 Eerste Divisie | 17th | – | 1986–87 | first round |
| 1985–86 Eerste Divisie | 12th | – | 1985–86 | first round |
| 1984–85 Eerste Divisie | 13th | – | 1984–85 | final |
| 1983–84 Eredivisie | 16th | Eerste Divisie (relegation) | 1983–84 | first round |
| 1982–83 Eredivisie | 15th | – | 1982–83 | round of 16 |
| 1981–82 Eerste Divisie | 1st | Eredivisie (promotion) | 1981–82 | first round |
| 1980–81 Eerste Divisie | 12th | – | 1980–81 | first round |
| 1979–80 Eerste Divisie | 15th | – | 1979–80 | first round |
| 1978–79 Eerste Divisie | 17th | – | 1978–79 | first round |
| 1977–78 Eerste Divisie | 16th | – | 1977–78 | first round |
| 1976–77 Eerste Divisie | 15th | – | 1976–77 | first round |
| 1975–76 Eerste Divisie | 16th | – | 1975–76 | second round |
| 1974–75 Eerste Divisie | 18th | – | 1974–75 | second round |
| 1973–74 Eerste Divisie | 6th | – | 1973–74 | round of 16 |
| 1972–73 Eerste Divisie | 5th | – | 1972–73 | second round |
| 1971–72 Eerste Divisie | 20th | – | 1971–72 | did not participate |
| 1970–71 Eerste Divisie | 12th | – | 1970–71 | first round |
| 1969–70 Eerste Divisie | 13th | – | 1969–70 | first round |
| 1968–69 Eerste Divisie | 6th | – | 1968–69 | second round |
| 1967–68 Tweede Divisie | 2nd | Eerste Divisie (winning promotion play-off) | 1967–68 | group stage |
| 1966–67 Tweede Divisie (as Helmondia '55) | 14th | – | 1966–67 | did not participate |
| 1965–66 Tweede Divisie (as Helmondia '55) | 12th (group B) | – | 1965–66 | group stage |
| 1964–65 Tweede Divisie (as Helmondia '55) | 2nd | promotion play-off: no promotion | 1964–65 | first round |
| 1963–64 Tweede Divisie (as Helmondia '55) | 7th (group B) | – | 1963–64 | second round |
| 1962–63 Tweede Divisie (as Helmondia '55) | 13th (group B) | – | 1962–63 | first round |
| 1961–62 Tweede Divisie (as Helmondia '55) | 3rd | – | 1961–62 | third round |
| 1960–61 Eerste Divisie (as Helmondia '55) | 18th (group A) | Tweede Divisie (relegation) | 1960–61 | group stage |
| 1959–60 Eerste Divisie (as Helmondia '55) | 13th (group B) | – | not held | not held |
| 1958–59 Eerste Divisie (as Helmondia '55) | 11th (group B) | – | 1958–59 | third round |
| 1957–58 Eerste Divisie (as Helmondia '55) | 11th (group B) | – | 1957–58 | fourth round |
| 1956–57 Eerste Divisie (as Helmondia '55) | 7th (group A) | – | 1956–57 | fourth round |

== Current squad ==
As of 22 September 2026

Note: Flags indicate national team as defined under FIFA eligibility rules; some limited exceptions apply. Players may hold more than one non-FIFA nationality.

| No. | Pos. | Nation | Player |
|---|---|---|---|
| 1 | GK | NED | Menno Bergsen |
| 2 | DF | NED | Rayen van Bree |
| 3 | DF | BEL | Flor Van den Eynden |
| 4 | DF | GER | Brian Koglin |
| 5 | DF | NED | Thomas Poll |
| 6 | MF | GER | Michel Ludwig |
| 7 | MF | NED | Joep van der Sluijs |
| 8 | MF | ESP | Pol Llonch (captain) |
| 9 | FW | SUI | Labinot Bajrami |
| 10 | MF | NED | Dean Huiberts |
| 11 | FW | BEL | Livio Cicero |
| 14 | DF | SLO | Lovro Golič (on loan from Mechelen) |
| 17 | DF | MAR | Wassim Lantaki (on loan from Mechelen) |

| No. | Pos. | Nation | Player |
|---|---|---|---|
| 19 | MF | ISL | Helgi Fródi Ingason |
| 20 | DF | NED | Sem Dekkers |
| 21 | GK | NED | Wessel van der Heijden |
| 22 | MF | CRO | Alen Dizdarević |
| 23 | GK | MAR | Adam El Maach |
| 30 | FW | BEL | Kiton Ekoli |
| 34 | MF | NED | Tarik Essakkati |
| 35 | MF | ESP | Nicolas Meissner |
| 41 | FW | NED | Julian Geerts |
| 43 | DF | NED | Tijn Landheer |
| 44 | MF | BEL | Xander van der Velde |
| 47 | MF | NED | Dayen Geerts |
| 94 | FW | BEL | Mauro Lenaerts (on loan from Mechelen) |

== Management ==
| Position | Name |
|---|---|
| Head coach | (Belgium) Frédéric Frans |
| Assistant coach | (Finland) Joonas Kolkka (Netherlands) Mitchel van Rosmalen |
| Goalkeeping coach | (Netherlands) Albert van der Sleen |
| Performance coach | (Belgium) Dean Cruydt |
| Head physiotherapist | (Netherlands) Erik Borsboom |
| Physiotherapist | (Netherlands) Kevin Geerts (Netherlands) Noah Baudoin |
| Materialman | (Netherlands) Ton Romonesco |
| Team manager | (Netherlands) John Koolen |
| Technical director | (Netherlands) Dirk Jan Derksen |

== Former managers ==
- (Netherlands) Frans Debruijn (1967–1968)
- (Netherlands) Jacques de Wit (1968–1972)
- (Netherlands) René van Eck (1972–1974)
- (Netherlands) Co Prins (a.i.) (1974)
- (Netherlands) Evert Mur (1974–75)
- (England) Ron Dellow (1975–77)
- (Netherlands) Harrie van Tuel (1977–1978)
- (Netherlands) Jacques de Wit (1978–1979)
- (Netherlands) Jan Notermans (1979–83)
- (Netherlands) Jan Brouwer (1983–86)
- (Netherlands) Jo Jansen (1986–87)
- (Netherlands) Theo Laseroms (1987–88)
- (Netherlands) Dick Buitelaar (1988–89)
- (Netherlands) Frans Körver (1989–92)
- (Netherlands) Henk Rayer (1992–93)
- (Netherlands) Louis Coolen (a.i.) (1993)
- (Netherlands) Adrie Koster (1993–95)
- (Netherlands) Jan Pruijn (1995–96)
- (Netherlands) Willem Leushuis (a.i.) (1996)
- (Netherlands) Louis Coolen (1996–01)
- (Netherlands) Mario Verlijsdonk (2001–02)
- (Netherlands) Jan van Dijk (2002–04)
- (Netherlands) Ruud Brood (2004–06)
- (Netherlands) Gerald Vanenburg (2006–07)
- (Netherlands) Mario Verlijsdonk (a.i.) (2007)
- (Netherlands) Jan Poortvliet (2007–08)
- (Netherlands) Jurgen Streppel (2008–11)
- (Netherlands) Hans de Koning (2011–12)
- (Netherlands) Eric Meijers (2012–13)
- (Netherlands) Mario Verlijsdonk (a.i.) (2013)
- (Netherlands) Jan van Dijk (2013–16)
- (Netherlands) Remond Strijbosch (a.i.) (2016)
- (Netherlands) Roy Hendriksen (2016–18)
- (Netherlands) Rob Alflen (2018–19)
- (Netherlands) Wil Boessen (2019–22)
- (Belgium) Sven Swinnen (2022)
- (Netherlands) Tim Bakens (a.i.) (2022)
- (Belgium) Bob Peeters (2022–24)
- (Netherlands) Adrie Bogers (a.i.) (2024)
- (Netherlands) Kevin Hofland (2024–25)
- (Netherlands) Robert Maaskant (2025)
- (Netherlands) Jurgen Seegers (2025–26)
- (Belgium) Frédéric Frans (2026–present)
