= 1969–70 Eredivisie =

14th season of the Eredivisie

Eredivisie
- Season: 1969–70
- Champions: AFC Ajax (14th title)
- Promoted: HFC Haarlem; SVV
- Relegated: GVAV; SVV
- European Cup: Ajax; Feijenoord
- Cup Winners' Cup: PSV Eindhoven
- Inter-Cities Fairs Cup: FC Twente; Sparta Rotterdam
- Goals: 820
- Average goals/game: 2.67
- Top goalscorer: (Netherlands) Willy van der Kuijlen; PSV Eindhoven 26 goals
- Highest attendance: 66,000
- Average attendance: 42,853

The Dutch Eredivisie in the 1969–70 season was contested by 18 teams. AFC Ajax won the championship. Feyenoord won the European Cup and therefore also qualified for that tournament as defending champions.

== League standings ==
Pos	Team	Pld	W	D	L	GF	GA	GD	Pts	Qualification or relegation
1	AFC Ajax	34	27	6	1	100	23	+77	60	Qualified for 1970–71 European Cup (Note: Feijenoord competed in the 1970–71 European Cup as defending champions.)
2	Feijenoord	34	22	11	1	81	22	+59	55	Qualified for 1970–71 European Cup
3	PSV Eindhoven	34	19	8	7	70	34	+36	46	Qualified for 1970–71 European Cup Winners' Cup
4	FC Twente	34	17	8	9	62	43	+19	42	Qualified for 1970–71 Inter-Cities Fairs Cup
5	Sparta Rotterdam	34	16	9	9	56	41	+15	41	Qualified for 1970–71 Inter-Cities Fairs Cup
6	ADO Den Haag	34	14	12	8	56	33	+23	40	
7	Go Ahead	34	11	13	10	40	42	−2	35	
8	MVV Maastricht	34	10	14	10	45	45	0	34	
9	Holland Sport	34	13	7	14	48	63	−15	33	
10	NAC	34	11	10	13	40	54	−14	32	
11	NEC	34	8	15	11	31	39	−8	31	
12	AZ '67	34	8	12	14	31	48	−17	28	
13	HFC Haarlem	34	6	15	13	23	36	−13	27	
14	Telstar	34	5	14	15	33	48	−15	24	
15	DWS	34	9	6	19	26	50	−24	24	
16	DOS	34	7	9	18	27	64	−37	23	Merged with Elinkwijk & Velox to form FC Utrecht
17	GVAV	34	7	8	19	20	45	−25	22	Relegated to Eerste Divisie
18	SVV	34	5	5	24	31	90	−59	15	Relegated to Eerste Divisie

Source: rsssf.com

== Results ==
Home \ Away	ADO	AJA	AZ	DOS	DWS	FEY	GOA	GVA	HFC	HOL	MVV	NAC	NEC	PSV	SPA	SVV	TEL	TWE
ADO		1–1	4–0	5–0	1–1	0–2	0–0	1–0	0–0	1–1	1–1	5–0	0–0	2–1	2–0	5–0	1–1	4–1
Ajax	2–1		4–1	4–0	6–1	3–3	2–0	3–0	4–0	5–1	2–0	2–1	2–1	3–0	2–1	8–0	4–1	3–0
AZ '67	1–1	0–1		1–0	3–1	1–1	2–1	0–1	1–1	1–1	0–0	1–1	1–1	0–0	0–1	1–0	0–0	0–1
DOS	1–1	1–7	0–2		1–1	1–1	2–3	2–0	2–1	0–1	1–1	0–2	1–0	0–0	2–1	1–0	0–1	1–1
DWS	1–0	0–2	1–0	1–0		0–3	0–0	1–2	1–1	2–0	0–1	0–1	1–1	0–0	0–2	3–2	3–0	0–1
Feijenoord	0–0	1–0	2–0	6–0	3–2		0–0	3–0	4–0	8–2	5–1	5–0	0–0	1–0	1–1	6–0	2–0	5–1
Go Ahead	2–0	1–3	1–0	3–0	1–0	0–1		1–1	2–1	1–2	3–3	2–0	1–1	2–1	2–3	1–0	1–1	1–1
GVAV	0–2	1–3	4–1	0–1	1–0	0–1	1–1		0–2	0–2	1–0	0–2	0–1	0–3	0–0	1–0	1–1	0–0
Haarlem	2–0	0–1	0–0	0–0	0–1	1–2	1–1	0–0		0–0	0–1	2–1	2–1	0–1	0–2	0–0	1–1	0–2
Holland Sport	4–2	1–4	2–3	3–3	3–0	0–0	2–2	2–1	0–1		2–1	1–1	2–0	0–3	2–3	2–1	2–0	3–1
MVV	2–2	1–1	0–1	2–0	2–1	1–1	0–1	2–0	1–1	2–0		0–0	1–1	1–1	2–1	2–1	0–0	1–3
NAC	0–2	1–1	2–2	2–1	2–0	0–4	2–0	2–0	1–1	2–3	3–1		0–0	2–4	1–2	4–0	1–0	1–1
N.E.C.	0–3	0–0	1–0	1–0	1–0	0–2	1–1	0–2	0–0	3–1	0–0	1–0		1–1	2–4	4–0	1–1	1–1
PSV	3–1	1–3	7–2	1–0	3–0	3–0	4–1	2–0	2–1	4–1	2–4	3–1	2–2		1–1	6–0	3–1	3–0
Sparta	1–2	2–4	0–0	0–0	2–0	0–0	3–0	2–0	1–1	2–1	4–3	1–2	3–1	1–2		3–1	3–2	3–0
SVV	1–3	0–6	3–2	4–2	0–2	3–4	0–3	1–1	0–0	0–1	3–7	1–1	4–2	2–1	2–2		1–3	1–0
Telstar	1–2	1–1	0–3	1–2	0–1	1–3	1–1	1–1	2–3	3–0	1–1	1–1	0–1	0–1	1–1	2–0		2–0
FC Twente '65	3–1	0–3	5–1	7–2	5–1	1–1	3–0	2–1	1–0	3–0	2–0	7–0	3–1	1–1	2–0	1–0	2–2	

Source: rsssf.com
Legend: Blue = home team win; Yellow = draw; Red = away team win.

== Attendances ==
#	Club	Average	Change
1	Feijenoord	42,853	−10.1
2	Ajax	21,147	+1.7
3	Twente	15,000	−18.8
4	PSV	12,941	+3.0
5	ADO	12,441	−5.6
6	NEC	12,165	−15.6
7	Holland Sport	11,794	−17.3
8	Go Ahead	11,500	−19.4
9	Sparta	10,824	−12.4
10	DOS	10,035	−4.4
11	MVV	9,888	+4.0
12	Haarlem	9,765	+44.3
13	NAC	9,382	−8.3
14	SVV	9,000	+37.8
15	GVAV	8,912	+22.2
16	AZ	8,529	−9.1
17	Telstar	8,265	+4.1
18	DWS	6,024	−26.1

== See also ==
- 1969–70 Eerste Divisie
- 1969–70 Tweede Divisie
- 1969–70 KNVB Cup
