= 1981–82 Eredivisie =

26th season of the Eredivisie

Eredivisie
- Season: 1981–82
- Champions: AFC Ajax (20th title)
- Promoted: HFC Haarlem; De Graafschap
- Relegated: MVV Maastricht; FC Den Haag; De Graafschap
- European Cup: AFC Ajax
- Cup Winners' Cup: AZ '67
- UEFA Cup: PSV Eindhoven; HFC Haarlem; FC Utrecht
- Goals: 1,014
- Average goals/game: 3.31
- Top goalscorer: (Netherlands) Wim Kieft; AFC Ajax 32 goals

The Dutch Eredivisie in the 1981–82 season was contested by 18 teams. Ajax won the championship. From this season onwards, three clubs relegated instead of two.

== League standings ==
Pos	Team	Pld	W	D	L	GF	GA	GD	Pts	Qualification or relegation
1	AFC Ajax	34	26	4	4	117	42	+75	56	Qualified for 1982–83 European Cup.
2	PSV Eindhoven	34	24	3	7	81	38	+43	51	Qualified for 1982–83 UEFA Cup.
3	AZ '67	34	21	5	8	74	40	+34	47	Qualified for 1982–83 European Cup Winners' Cup.
4	HFC Haarlem	34	17	8	9	57	41	+16	42	Qualified for 1982–83 UEFA Cup.
5	FC Utrecht	34	17	5	12	56	38	+18	39	Qualified for 1982–83 UEFA Cup.
6	Feyenoord	34	13	12	9	61	59	+2	38	
7	FC Groningen	34	14	9	11	68	58	+10	37	
8	Sparta Rotterdam	34	13	10	11	61	48	+13	36	
9	Roda JC	34	15	6	13	60	53	+7	36	
10	Go Ahead Eagles	34	13	9	12	58	49	+9	35	
11	NAC	34	12	9	13	42	48	−6	33	
12	FC Twente	34	13	5	16	50	58	−8	31	
13	NEC	34	11	8	15	41	62	−21	30	
14	Willem II	34	10	7	17	50	64	−14	27	
15	PEC Zwolle	34	8	10	16	45	69	−24	26	
16	MVV Maastricht	34	6	11	17	35	70	−35	23	Relegated to Eerste Divisie.
17	FC Den Haag	34	4	5	25	29	82	−53	13	Relegated to Eerste Divisie.
18	De Graafschap	34	3	6	25	29	95	−66	12	Relegated to Eerste Divisie.

Source: rsssf.com

== Results ==
Home \ Away	AJA	AZ	FEY	GAE	GRA	GRO	DHA	HFC	MVV	NAC	NEC	PEC	PSV	RJC	SPA	TWE	UTR	WIL
Ajax		3–2	1–1	4–1	9–1	6–1	9–1	4–1	2–0	2–2	5–0	5–1	3–0	3–2	5–1	5–1	1–0	4–1
AZ '67	1–0		1–0	1–3	4–0	3–1	5–2	0–1	4–1	4–0	4–2	1–1	0–2	4–0	2–2	2–1	2–1	2–0
Feyenoord	2–2	4–2		2–0	1–0	3–2	2–1	1–3	6–1	0–0	2–2	5–5	2–4	1–0	2–4	3–3	1–0	2–0
Go Ahead Eagles	1–2	4–1	3–2		1–0	3–1	3–0	3–1	4–1	2–1	0–0	2–2	1–2	0–0	0–0	0–0	2–3	1–1
De Graafschap	1–4	0–3	3–3	1–4		1–3	1–1	1–2	2–2	0–0	1–2	2–0	1–2	2–4	1–4	1–6	0–3	0–0
FC Groningen	2–3	1–3	2–2	2–2	3–2		4–2	1–1	3–0	1–1	2–0	6–2	4–0	2–2	2–1	3–0	1–1	2–1
FC Den Haag	1–3	1–4	1–2	0–6	2–1	0–1		0–4	0–0	0–2	0–1	2–1	0–0	1–3	1–2	3–2	0–1	3–1
FC Haarlem	1–3	0–0	1–1	3–1	3–0	1–2	1–1		3–2	4–2	4–0	2–1	4–3	1–0	0–0	3–0	2–0	2–1
MVV	0–2	0–4	1–1	1–1	0–2	3–1	1–0	2–1		1–1	1–1	0–1	1–7	1–2	2–1	3–1	0–3	1–1
NAC	0–4	0–1	0–1	1–0	5–1	0–4	5–0	2–0	0–0		1–0	4–0	2–0	3–1	0–2	0–0	1–0	1–4
N.E.C.	1–3	0–3	5–1	1–3	2–0	2–2	2–1	1–1	2–1	1–1		3–1	0–4	2–1	3–3	2–1	1–0	0–4
PEC Zwolle	1–3	0–0	2–1	3–0	3–1	0–4	2–2	0–0	2–0	1–2	1–0		0–1	3–1	1–1	5–1	1–1	1–5
PSV	3–0	2–4	1–2	4–1	4–0	2–0	1–0	3–0	2–2	4–1	3–0	1–1		3–1	2–1	4–0	3–1	4–0
Roda JC	1–1	1–2	2–2	2–3	0–1	4–3	3–2	2–0	2–2	1–0	4–1	4–1	2–3		2–0	3–0	2–1	1–2
Sparta Rotterdam	5–3	2–2	1–1	1–1	4–0	4–0	2–1	0–3	4–1	5–0	1–0	1–1	0–2	1–2		1–2	2–2	3–1
FC Twente	2–1	2–0	4–0	1–0	4–0	1–1	2–0	0–2	2–2	0–1	0–2	2–0	2–3	1–3	1–0		2–1	2–0
FC Utrecht	3–5	1–0	2–1	2–0	5–0	1–0	4–0	2–0	1–0	2–2	1–0	3–0	2–1	0–0	0–1	4–2		5–2
Willem II	1–7	2–3	0–1	3–2	2–2	1–1	1–0	2–2	1–2	2–1	2–2	3–1	0–1	1–2	2–1	0–2	3–0	

Legend: Blue = home team win; Yellow = draw; Red = away team win.

== See also ==
- 1981–82 Eerste Divisie
- 1981–82 KNVB Cup
