= 1978–79 Eredivisie =

23rd season of the Eredivisie

Eredivisie
- Season: 1978–79
- Champions: AFC Ajax (18th title)
- Promoted: PEC Zwolle; MVV Maastricht
- Relegated: FC Volendam; VVV-Venlo
- European Cup: AFC Ajax
- Cup Winners' Cup: FC Twente
- UEFA Cup: Feyenoord; PSV Eindhoven
- Goals: 873
- Average goals/game: 2.85
- Top goalscorer: (Netherlands) Kees Kist; AZ '67 34 goals

The Dutch Eredivisie in the 1978–79 season was contested by 18 teams. Ajax won the championship.

== League standings ==
Pos	Team	Pld	W	D	L	GF	GA	GD	Pts	Qualification or relegation
1	AFC Ajax	34	24	6	4	93	31	+62	54	Qualified for 1979–80 European Cup
2	Feyenoord	34	19	13	2	62	19	+43	51	Qualified for 1979–80 UEFA Cup
3	PSV Eindhoven	34	20	9	5	65	23	+42	49	Qualified for 1979–80 UEFA Cup
4	AZ '67	34	19	7	8	84	43	+41	45	
5	Roda JC	34	18	8	8	58	33	+25	44	
6	Sparta Rotterdam	34	14	5	15	47	48	−1	33	
7	FC Den Haag	34	11	11	12	43	55	−12	33	
8	PEC Zwolle	34	7	18	9	36	46	−10	32	
9	Go Ahead Eagles	34	11	9	14	48	48	0	31	
10	NAC	34	8	15	11	41	51	−10	31	
11	MVV Maastricht	34	9	13	12	26	45	−19	31	
12	FC Twente	34	9	12	13	54	58	−4	30	Qualified for 1979–80 European Cup Winners' Cup (Note: AFC Ajax also won the KNVB Cup, thereby taking the double. They would participate in the European Cup, so finalists FC Twente could play in the Cup Winners' Cup.)
13	FC Utrecht	34	10	10	14	43	55	−12	30	
14	Vitesse Arnhem	34	7	15	12	42	63	−21	29	
15	NEC	34	7	14	13	35	49	−14	28	
16	HFC Haarlem	34	6	13	15	31	64	−33	25	
17	FC Volendam	34	7	8	19	42	63	−21	22	Relegated to Eerste Divisie
18	VVV-Venlo	34	4	6	24	23	79	−56	14	Relegated to Eerste Divisie

Source: rsssf.com

== Results ==
Home \ Away	AJA	AZ	FEY	GAE	DHA	HFC	MVV	NAC	NEC	PEC	PSV	RJC	SPA	TWE	UTR	VIT	VOL	VVV
Ajax		1–1	0–0	3–2	4–1	4–1	6–0	0–0	3–2	4–2	2–0	1–2	1–0	8–1	6–1	4–0	7–3	4–0
AZ '67	1–2		2–2	1–0	7–1	3–0	0–0	5–1	8–1	4–1	1–0	3–1	2–0	3–0	3–0	0–2	4–1	8–1
Feyenoord	1–1	1–1		5–0	2–0	5–0	3–0	2–1	0–0	3–1	1–0	2–1	4–1	2–0	1–0	3–0	2–0	5–0
Go Ahead Eagles	1–2	1–3	2–1		1–1	2–2	0–1	1–0	2–0	2–2	1–1	3–0	5–3	1–0	2–3	4–0	2–1	2–0
FC Den Haag	0–0	3–2	1–1	2–1		3–1	1–1	1–1	3–2	0–0	0–0	0–3	0–2	0–0	3–1	2–0	2–1	3–1
Haarlem	0–1	3–2	1–1	0–0	3–1		0–1	0–0	2–2	2–1	0–5	1–1	0–0	2–2	0–0	1–1	0–1	2–0
MVV	1–0	1–3	0–2	2–1	1–3	1–1		1–1	2–0	1–1	0–2	0–3	3–1	0–0	1–0	1–1	0–2	1–1
NAC	1–7	2–3	0–0	3–1	3–1	1–1	0–0		2–2	1–1	0–2	0–0	3–2	3–1	3–2	0–0	5–1	2–0
N.E.C.	0–2	1–0	2–2	1–1	0–2	0–1	1–1	0–0		0–0	0–0	0–0	1–0	0–0	0–0	4–1	4–1	4–1
PEC Zwolle	0–3	0–0	0–2	1–1	0–0	2–0	0–2	1–1	2–0		0–0	1–1	0–0	3–3	1–0	2–2	2–1	3–2
PSV	3–1	3–1	1–2	1–0	2–0	4–1	0–0	2–0	4–0	0–1		2–1	2–1	1–0	3–0	5–0	3–1	2–0
Roda JC	1–3	3–1	1–1	1–1	1–0	2–1	3–0	3–1	3–1	2–0	1–3		4–0	0–0	0–0	3–0	5–1	2–1
Sparta Rotterdam	1–0	2–3	1–0	2–0	1–2	0–1	2–1	3–2	1–0	2–2	1–1	0–1		1–0	2–0	3–1	3–0	3–0
FC Twente '65	2–3	4–2	0–0	1–2	5–2	7–2	3–0	1–1	2–1	1–1	2–2	1–2	2–1		2–2	2–3	3–0	2–0
FC Utrecht	1–4	1–2	1–3	2–1	5–3	4–0	0–0	1–1	2–4	1–1	2–2	1–0	2–3	1–1		2–0	2–1	2–0
Vitesse	0–0	3–4	1–1	0–0	1–1	2–2	3–0	3–1	0–1	3–1	2–2	2–5	2–2	3–2	1–1		0–0	1–1
FC Volendam	1–3	0–0	0–2	2–1	1–1	4–0	1–1	3–0	0–0	0–0	1–2	1–2	1–3	5–0	0–1	2–2		4–0
FC VVV	1–3	1–1	0–0	1–4	1–0	1–0	0–2	0–1	1–1	2–3	0–5	1–0	2–0	1–4	1–2	1–2	1–1	

Source: rsssf.com
Legend: Blue = home team win; Yellow = draw; Red = away team win.

== See also ==
- 1978–79 Eerste Divisie
- 1978–79 KNVB Cup
