= 1967–68 Eredivisie =

12th season of the Eredivisie

Eredivisie
- Season: 1967–68
- Champions: AFC Ajax (13th title)
- Promoted: NEC Nijmegen; FC Volendam
- Relegated: None
- European Cup: AFC Ajax
- Cup Winners' Cup: ADO Den Haag
- Inter-Cities Fairs Cup: Feijenoord; DWS; DOS
- Goals: 880
- Average goals/game: 2.87
- Top goalscorer: (Sweden) Ove Kindvall; Feijenoord 28 g.

The Dutch Eredivisie in the 1967–68 season was contested by 18 teams. Ajax won the championship. This season, no teams relegated, due to bankruptcy of Xerxes/DHC and a merger between Fortuna '54 and Sittardia into Fortuna Sittardia Combinatie (or Fortuna SC).

== Teams ==
A total of 18 teams are taking part in the league.

Location of teams in Eredivisie 1968–69

Club	Location
ADO Den Haag	The Hague
AFC Ajax	Amsterdam
DOS	Utrecht
DWS	Amsterdam
Feyenoord	Rotterdam
Fortuna '54	Sittard
Go Ahead	Deventer
GVAV	Groningen
MVV	Maastricht
NAC Breda	Breda
NEC Nijmegen	Nijmegen
PSV Eindhoven	Eindhoven
Sittardia	Sittard
Sparta Rotterdam	Rotterdam
Telstar	IJmuiden
FC Twente	Enschede
FC Volendam	Volendam
Xerxes/DHC	Rotterdam

== League standings ==
Pos	Team	Pld	W	D	L	GF	GA	GD	Pts	Qualification or relegation
1	AFC Ajax	34	27	4	3	96	19	+77	58	Qualified for 1968–69 European Cup
2	Feijenoord	34	25	5	4	84	21	+63	55	Qualified for 1968–69 Inter-Cities Fairs Cup
3	Go Ahead	34	17	8	9	65	41	+24	42	
4	ADO Den Haag	34	15	11	8	53	34	+19	41	Qualified for 1968–69 European Cup Winners' Cup
5	Sparta Rotterdam	34	15	10	9	53	33	+20	40	
6	GVAV	34	10	16	8	38	35	+3	36	
7	Xerxes/DHC	34	13	9	12	45	47	−2	35	Club disbanded due to financial problems
8	FC Twente	34	13	8	13	56	58	−2	34	
9	DWS	34	12	8	14	47	57	−10	32	Qualified for 1968–69 Inter-Cities Fairs Cup
10	NEC Nijmegen	34	9	13	12	41	51	−10	31	
11	Telstar	34	11	7	16	43	55	−12	29	
12	FC Volendam	34	8	13	13	39	56	−17	29	
13	MVV Maastricht	34	8	12	14	37	50	−13	28	
14	PSV Eindhoven	34	9	9	16	43	54	−11	27	
15	NAC	34	9	8	17	25	56	−31	26	
16	DOS	34	6	13	15	40	64	−24	25	Qualified for 1968–69 Inter-Cities Fairs Cup
17	Fortuna '54	34	6	13	15	37	70	−33	25	Merged as Fortuna SC
18	Sittardia	34	6	7	21	38	79	−41	19	Merged as Fortuna SC

Source: rsssf.com

== Results ==
Home \ Away	ADO	AJA	DOS	DWA	FEY	F54	GOA	GVA	MVV	NAC	NEC	PSV	SIT	SPA	TEL	TWE	VOL	XED
ADO		1–0	5–1	3–1	3–6	0–0	0–0	3–3	2–1	2–1	0–1	0–0	4–0	2–0	2–1	2–2	2–0	0–2
Ajax	2–1		4–0	3–2	1–0	7–1	2–0	3–1	4–0	3–0	9–1	4–0	4–0	3–0	3–0	2–1	7–1	5–0
DOS	2–2	1–1		1–2	2–0	0–2	0–1	2–2	1–0	0–0	2–2	0–3	2–1	1–1	4–0	5–0	2–1	1–1
DWS/A	1–0	1–4	3–1		1–2	2–0	1–3	1–1	0–0	2–1	1–3	1–2	3–0	1–0	3–1	2–1	3–3	1–2
Feijenoord	1–0	1–0	5–0	4–0		6–0	3–1	0–0	3–0	4–0	2–0	4–2	5–1	3–1	2–0	6–0	4–1	0–1
Fortuna '54	1–2	1–4	2–2	1–1	0–1		1–1	0–2	2–2	1–1	2–2	0–3	2–1	1–0	1–1	4–2	5–0	3–1
Go Ahead	0–4	0–1	7–1	2–1	1–1	3–1		3–1	2–0	6–0	3–1	5–1	3–0	0–0	3–1	0–0	3–1	3–0
GVAV	2–0	1–1	1–1	1–1	0–0	2–0	1–0		2–2	0–1	0–0	2–1	1–2	0–1	1–0	2–2	3–0	1–1
MVV	1–2	0–4	2–0	2–0	0–2	2–0	1–1	1–1		2–0	1–0	0–0	6–4	0–0	3–2	0–1	0–0	0–0
NAC	0–0	0–1	1–1	1–0	0–3	0–0	1–2	0–0	1–1		0–0	2–1	1–0	1–0	2–1	1–0	0–2	4–2
NEC	1–0	0–2	1–1	2–2	0–5	0–0	3–3	0–1	4–2	2–1		4–0	2–2	3–1	2–0	1–1	2–2	0–0
PSV	1–1	1–2	1–1	5–1	1–0	1–1	1–2	0–0	0–3	6–0	1–0		4–1	1–5	0–1	1–2	1–1	1–1
Sittardia	2–2	1–1	4–2	0–1	1–2	3–0	0–1	3–1	2–2	0–2	1–3	1–1		0–3	1–4	2–1	2–1	1–1
Sparta	1–4	1–0	3–0	4–1	1–1	1–1	1–1	4–0	2–0	2–1	1–0	3–0	5–0		1–1	0–0	1–1	3–0
Telstar	0–0	0–3	1–0	1–1	1–2	3–1	2–1	0–3	0–0	4–0	2–0	2–1	1–1	1–3		4–1	2–1	2–2
FC Twente	0–3	1–1	2–2	1–3	1–2	8–2	5–2	1–2	2–1	3–1	1–0	1–0	5–1	2–0	4–2		2–1	2–0
Volendam	0–0	1–4	1–0	1–1	1–1	1–1	1–0	0–0	4–1	2–1	0–0	2–0	1–0	2–3	0–2	1–1		4–1
Xerxes/DHC '66	0–1	0–1	2–1	1–2	0–3	5–0	4–2	1–0	2–1	3–0	2–1	1–2	2–0	1–1	3–0	2–0	1–1	

Legend: Blue = home team win; Yellow = draw; Red = away team win.

== Attendances ==
#	Club	Average	Change
1	Feijenoord	48,088	+43.5
2	Ajax	25,500	+12.9
3	NEC	18,941	+39.2
4	ADO	15,324	−11.1
5	Sparta	14,559	+13.0
6	Go Ahead	13,029	−3.5
7	PSV	12,971	+31.3
8	DOS	11,488	+15.8
9	Twente	11,206	+60.8
10	GVAV	11,059	+8.4
11	NAC	10,724	+29.3
12	Fortuna	9,765	+10.3
13	DWS	9,412	−11.4
14	Telstar	8,706	+11.3
15	Xerxes	8,453	−9.1
16	MVV	8,118	−10.4
17	Volendam	7,294	+39.3
18	Sittardia	7,235	−29.6

== See also ==
- 1967–68 Eerste Divisie
- 1967–68 Tweede Divisie
