= Eerste Divisie =

Dutch association football league

- Founded: 1956; 70 years ago
- Country: Netherlands
- Confederation: UEFA
- Number of clubs: 20
- Level on pyramid: 2
- Promotion to: Eredivisie
- Relegation to: Tweede Divisie (reserve teams)
- Domestic cup: KNVB Cup
- Current champions: ADO (4th title) (2025–26)
- Most championships: Volendam (7 titles)
- Broadcaster: ESPN
- Sponsor: Keuken Kampioen
- Website: keukenkampioendivisie.nl
- Current: 2026–27 Eerste Divisie

The Eerste Divisie (Dutch pronunciation: [ˈeːrstə diˈvizi]; English: First Division), officially known as the Keuken Kampioen Divisie due to sponsorship reasons, is the second-highest tier of football in the Netherlands. It is linked with the top-level Eredivisie via promotion/relegation systems.

== History ==
The Eerste Divisie consists of 20 clubs, who play each other in a double round-robin league, with each club playing the other club home and away. Each club plays every other club once in the first half of the season before the league takes a winter break around the Christmas and New Year's holiday season. The second half of the season sees the same fixtures as the first half, with the stadiums changed, although the two halves are not played in the same order.

At the end of each season, the champions and the runners-up of the Eerste Divisie are automatically promoted to the Eredivisie. Six other clubs enter the Nacompetitie [ˈnaːkɔmpəˌti(t)si], a promotion/relegation playoff that includes the 16th-placed club in the Eredivisie. The six clubs from the Eerste Divisie include the four 'period champions', or best-performing teams from each quarter of the regular season, along with the two best-placed teams who are not period champions.

If the club that wins a period has qualified for the Nacompetitie by winning a previous period, its place is filled by the next-best club in that period that has not already qualified; in addition, reserve teams are not eligible for promotion to the Eredivisie. Usually, the clubs that qualify for the Nacompetitie turn out to be the 3rd- through 9th-placed clubs in the final table. Clubs in the Nacompetitie face each other in a knock-out system with the number 16 of the Eredivisie for one place in next season's Eredivisie.

Since the KNVB decided to seek sponsors for the divisions in 1990, the league was called the Toto-Divisie. Between September 2001 and June 2006, that was with introduction of the then sponsor Gouden Gids Divisie. Between July 2006 and June 2018, with the introduction of the sponsor, that had become the Jupiler League. Since July 2018, with the introduction of the new sponsor, that has become the Keuken Kampioen Divisie.

Between seasons 1971–72 and 2008–09 teams could not relegate from the Eerste Divisie. From the 2009–10 season onwards, one team has been relegated from the Eerste Divisie to the Hoofdklasse (then the main amateur league of Dutch football). From the 2010–11 to 2015–16 seasons, the KNVB introduced a third and highest amateur tier called Topklasse, and Hoofdklasse clubs have been able to get promoted to that new division.

Before the 2008–09 season, Hoofdklasse clubs could be promoted by obtaining a professional license. However, only a club going bankrupt or losing its license could result in clubs leaving professional football. The last clubs leaving professional football in that way were FC Wageningen and VCV Zeeland in 1992, and more recently HFC Haarlem and RBC Roosendaal, who went bankrupt in January 2010 and June 2011 respectively. The most recent additions to the league were AGOVV Apeldoorn in 2003 and FC Omniworld in 2005, expanding the league to 19 and later 20 clubs. However, for the 2010–11 season, the league returned to 18 clubs, as HFC Haarlem went bankrupt and FC Oss was relegated to the newly formed Topklasse. The 2012–13 season ended with 16 teams after AGOVV and SC Veendam went bankrupt. Four teams have been added to bring the division back up to 20 teams in 2013. Achilles '29 has been promoted from the Topklasse with the reserve teams of Ajax, FC Twente and PSV being added as well.

Since the 2016–17 season there is optional relegation to the third-tier, amateur Tweede Divisie. Clubs in the Tweede Divisie had to announce in mid-season if they want to be eligible for promotion. Only if one of those clubs won the Tweede Divisie championship is a team relegated from the Eerste Divisie.

The remainder of the 2019–20 season was cancelled amid the coronavirus disease 2019 (COVID-19) pandemic, thus there were no promotions or relegations. Before the cancellation, the KNVB met in December 2019 and ruled that promotion to the second division and relegation to the third were suspended until 2022–23, and that the lowest-ranked Eerste Divisie Jong team will exchange places with its highest-ranked Tweede Divisie counterpart. In June 2022, the KNVB decided that relegation from the Eerste Divisie will stay absent for an extended period of 5 to 10 years.

== Clubs ==
=== 2026–27 members ===
Location of teams in the Eerste Divisie 2026–27

Club	Location	Venue	Capacity
Almere City	Almere	Yanmar Hanasaka Stadion	4,501
De Graafschap	Doetinchem	Stadion De Vijverberg	12,600
FC Den Bosch	's-Hertogenbosch	Stadion De Vliert	8,713
FC Dordrecht	Dordrecht	Stadion Krommedijk	4,235
FC Eindhoven	Eindhoven	Jan Louwers Stadion	4,600
FC Emmen	Emmen	De Oude Meerdijk	8,600
Helmond Sport	Helmond	GS Staalwerken Stadion	4,142
Heracles	Almelo	Asito Stadion	12,080
Jong Ajax	Amsterdam	Sportpark De Toekomst	2,050
Jong AZ	Alkmaar	AFAS Trainingscomplex	200
Jong PSV	Eindhoven	De Herdgang	2,500
Jong FC Utrecht	Utrecht	Sportcomplex Zoudenbalch	550
MVV Maastricht	Maastricht	Stadion De Geusselt	10,000
NAC Breda	Breda	Rat Verlegh Stadion	20,500
RKC Waalwijk	Waalwijk	Mandemakers Stadion	7,508
Roda JC Kerkrade	Kerkrade	Parkstad Limburg Stadion	19,979
TOP Oss	Oss	Frans Heesen Stadion	4,560
SBV Vitesse	Arnhem	Gelredome	21,248
VVV-Venlo	Venlo	De Koel	8,000
FC Volendam	Volendam	Kras Stadion	6,984

== Attendance record ==
Clubs with larger fanbases suffered relegation in the 2000s, with Roda JC setting the Eerste Divisie attendance record at 16,150 during their home game against NEC Nijmegen in the 2014–15 season. NAC Breda bettered it a season later in their home match against Go Ahead Eagles, which had an attendance of 17,800 people.

== Champions ==
Season	Winner	Runner-up
1956–57	ADO / Blauw Wit	Alkmaar '54 / Stormvogels
1957–58	Willem II / SHS	DFC / Stormvogels
1958–59	FC Volendam / Sittardia	Leeuwarden / Stormvogels
1959–60	GVAV / Alkmaar '54	Vitesse / DFC
1960–61	FC Volendam / Blauw Wit	De Volewijckers / DHC
1961–62	Heracles / Fortuna Vlaardingen	Excelsior / DHC
1962–63	DWS	Go Ahead
1963–64	Sittardia	Telstar
1964–65	Willem II	USV Elinkwijk
1965–66	Sittardia	Xerxes
1966–67	FC Volendam	NEC
1967–68	Holland Sport	AZ '67
1968–69	SVV	HFC Haarlem
1969–70	FC Volendam	Excelsior
1970–71	FC Den Bosch	GVAV
1971–72	HFC Haarlem	AZ '67
1972–73	Roda JC	PEC Zwolle
1973–74	Excelsior	Vitesse
1974–75	NEC	FC Groningen
1975–76	HFC Haarlem	FC VVV
1976–77	Vitesse	PEC Zwolle
1977–78	PEC Zwolle	MVV Maastricht
1978–79	Excelsior	FC Groningen
1979–80	FC Groningen	FC Volendam
1980–81	HFC Haarlem	SC Heerenveen
1981–82	Helmond Sport	Fortuna Sittard
1982–83	DS '79	FC Volendam
1983–84	MVV Maastricht	FC Twente
1984–85	SC Heracles	FC VVV
1985–86	FC Den Haag	PEC Zwolle
1986–87	FC Volendam	Willem II
1987–88	RKC Waalwijk	SC Veendam
1988–89	Vitesse	FC Den Haag
1989–90	SVV	NAC Breda
1990–91	De Graafschap	NAC Breda
1991–92	SC Cambuur	BVV Den Bosch
1992–93	VVV-Venlo	SC Heerenveen
1993–94	Dordrecht '90	NEC
1994–95	Fortuna Sittard	De Graafschap
1995–96	AZ	FC Emmen
1996–97	MVV Maastricht	SC Cambuur
1997–98	AZ	SC Cambuur
1998–99	FC Den Bosch	FC Groningen
1999–2000	NAC Breda	FC Zwolle
2000–01	FC Den Bosch	Excelsior
2001–02	FC Zwolle	Excelsior
2002–03	ADO Den Haag	FC Emmen
2003–04	FC Den Bosch	Excelsior
2004–05	Heracles Almelo	Sparta Rotterdam
2005–06	Excelsior	VVV-Venlo
2006–07	De Graafschap	VVV-Venlo
2007–08	FC Volendam	RKC Waalwijk
2008–09	VVV-Venlo	RKC Waalwijk
2009–10	De Graafschap	SC Cambuur
2010–11	RKC Waalwijk	FC Zwolle
2011–12	FC Zwolle	Sparta Rotterdam
2012–13	SC Cambuur	FC Volendam
2013–14	Willem II	FC Dordrecht
2014–15	NEC	FC Eindhoven
2015–16	Sparta	VVV-Venlo
2016–17	VVV-Venlo	Jong Ajax
2017–18	Jong Ajax	Fortuna Sittard
2018–19	FC Twente	Sparta Rotterdam
2019–20	No champion and runner-up	
2020–21	SC Cambuur	Go Ahead Eagles
2021–22	FC Emmen	FC Volendam
2022–23	Heracles Almelo	PEC Zwolle
2023–24	Willem II	Groningen
2024–25	FC Volendam	Excelsior
2025–26	ADO Den Haag	Cambuur

^{1} Blauw Wit, De Volewijckers and DWS merged into FC Amsterdam, which folded in 1982. Reformed as Blauw-Wit Amsterdam, defunct in 2015.
^{2} Fortuna 54 merged with Sittardia to form FSC, later renamed Fortuna Sittard.
^{3} ADO merged with Holland Sport into FC Den Haag, later renamed ADO Den Haag
^{4} SV SVV (SVV) and Drecht Steden 79 (DS '79) merged into SVV/Dordrecht'90. Now FC Dordrecht.

== Playoffs ==
=== Promotion ===
Position	Playoff	Following season
1 & 2	Direct promotion	Eredivisie^{a}
Period champion	Round 1 if it is a low ranked club, semi-finals if it is a highly ranked club.	Eredivisie or Eerste Divisie depends on whether the team wins the pools final.
High-ranked clubs	Playoff Semi-finals	Eredivisie or Eerste Divisie depends on whether the team wins the pools final.
Lower-ranked club	Playoff Round 1	Eredivisie or Eerste Divisie depends on whether the team wins the pools final.

^{a}A Jong (reserve) team can become the champion, but they cannot be promoted; the direct promotion or the play-off ticket will then be given to the next highest non-Jong team in the table.

==== Round 1 ====
Round 1 will be played against lower-ranked teams, in both pools (Pool A or Pool B). The Round 1 winners will compete in the semi-finals against the number 16th from the Eredivisie.

==== Semi-finals ====
In both pools of the semi-finals, there are two matches played (Match A and Match B). Match A is the winner of Round 1 against the number 16th of the Eredivisie. Match B is against two highly ranked clubs, with the winners of Match A and Match B will go to the finals.

==== Finals ====
Both pools have their own finals, the finals are played against the winner of Match A and Match B of the semi-finals. The winner of the finals will go to the Eredivisie.

== See also ==
- Eredivisie
- KNVB Cup
- Johan Cruijff Shield
- Football in the Netherlands
- Sports league attendances
