= SC Amersfoort =

Association football club in the Netherlands

- Full name: Sportclub Amersfoort
- Founded: July 30, 1973; 53 years ago
- Dissolved: 15 December 1982
- Ground: Sportpark Birkhoven, Amersfoort
- Capacity: 10,000
Home colours

Sportclub Amersfoort was a Dutch football club based in Amersfoort, Utrecht.

== History ==
It was founded on 30 July 1973 and played 10 years in the Dutch second league of professional football, Eerste Divisie.

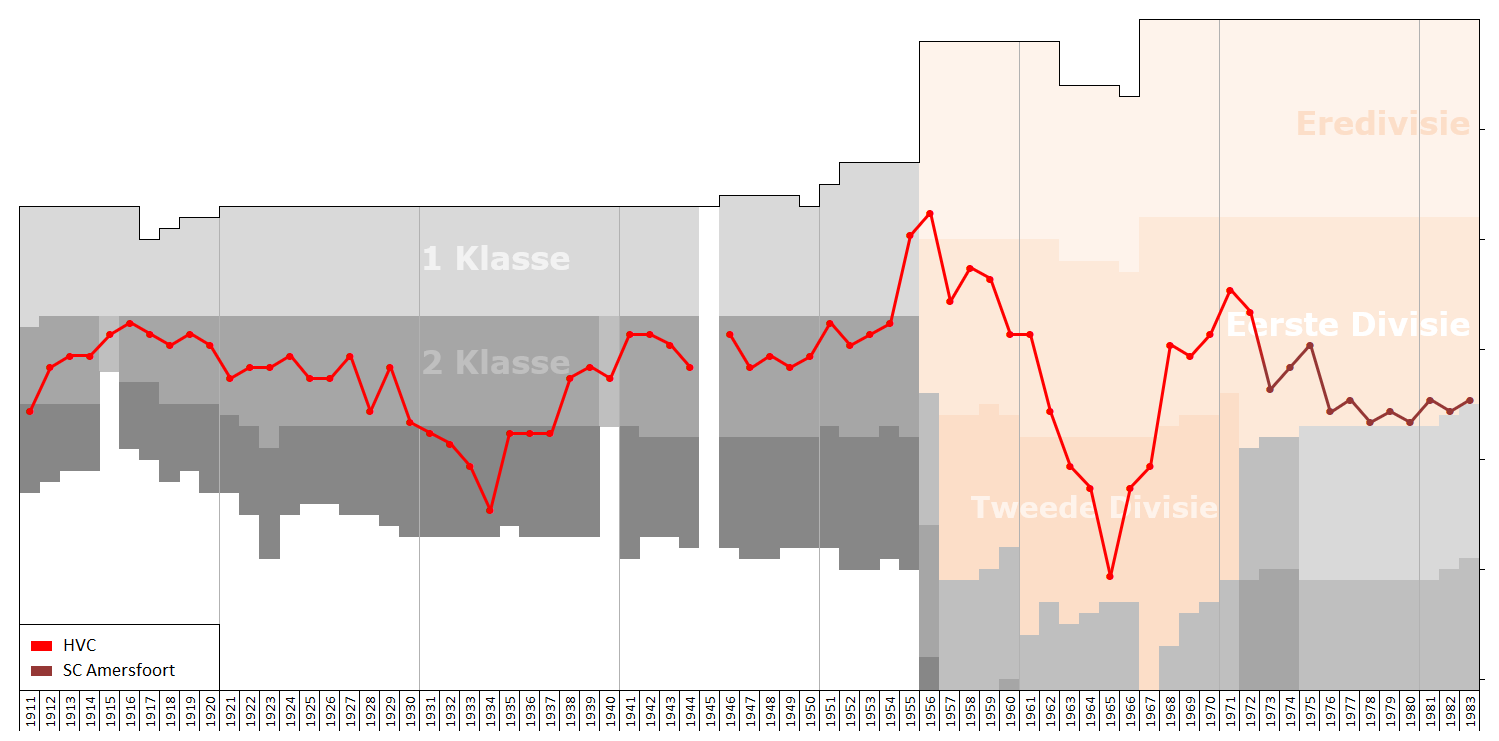
Historical chart of league performance

The club was a successor to the first-division club HVC (Hollandia Victoria Combinatie) which traditionally had been the largest club in Amersfoort. The introduction of professional football in 1954, along with the signing of players from outside the city, caused the club to become alienated from its fan base, leading to significant difficulties. In 1973, HVC’s amateur and professional branches were separated; the professional side continued as SC Amersfoort. They played their home games at Birkhoven sports complex.

Due to financial problems the club was taken out of the competition after 15 games into the 1982-83 Eerste Divisie season, only half a season after the folding of FC Amsterdam. HVC still exists today as an amateur club.

== Historical list of coaches ==
- (Netherlands) Bas Paauwe (1956–1958)
- (Netherlands) Evert Sterk (1958–1960)
- (Netherlands) Gerrie Stroker (1960–1962)
- (Netherlands) Bas Paauwe (1962–1964)
- (Netherlands) Hans Croon (1964–1969)
- (Netherlands) Nico van Miltenburg (1969)
- (Netherlands) Hennie Hollink (1969-1972)
- (Netherlands) Bas Paauwe (1972–1973)
- (Netherlands) Nico van Miltenburg (1973-1978)
- (Netherlands) Hans Alleman (1978-1980)
- (Netherlands) Henk Hofstee (1980-1982)
