= Fortuna Vlaardingen =

- Full name: Fortuna Vlaardingen
- Founded: 1904; 1974 (as FC Vlaardingen '74)
- Dissolved: 1981 (professional branch)
- Ground: Floreslaan; Vlaardingen
- Capacity: 8,000

Fortuna Vlaardingen was a Dutch football club which was founded in 1904 in Vlaardingen. The club played its matches in the Floreslaan stadium.

== History ==
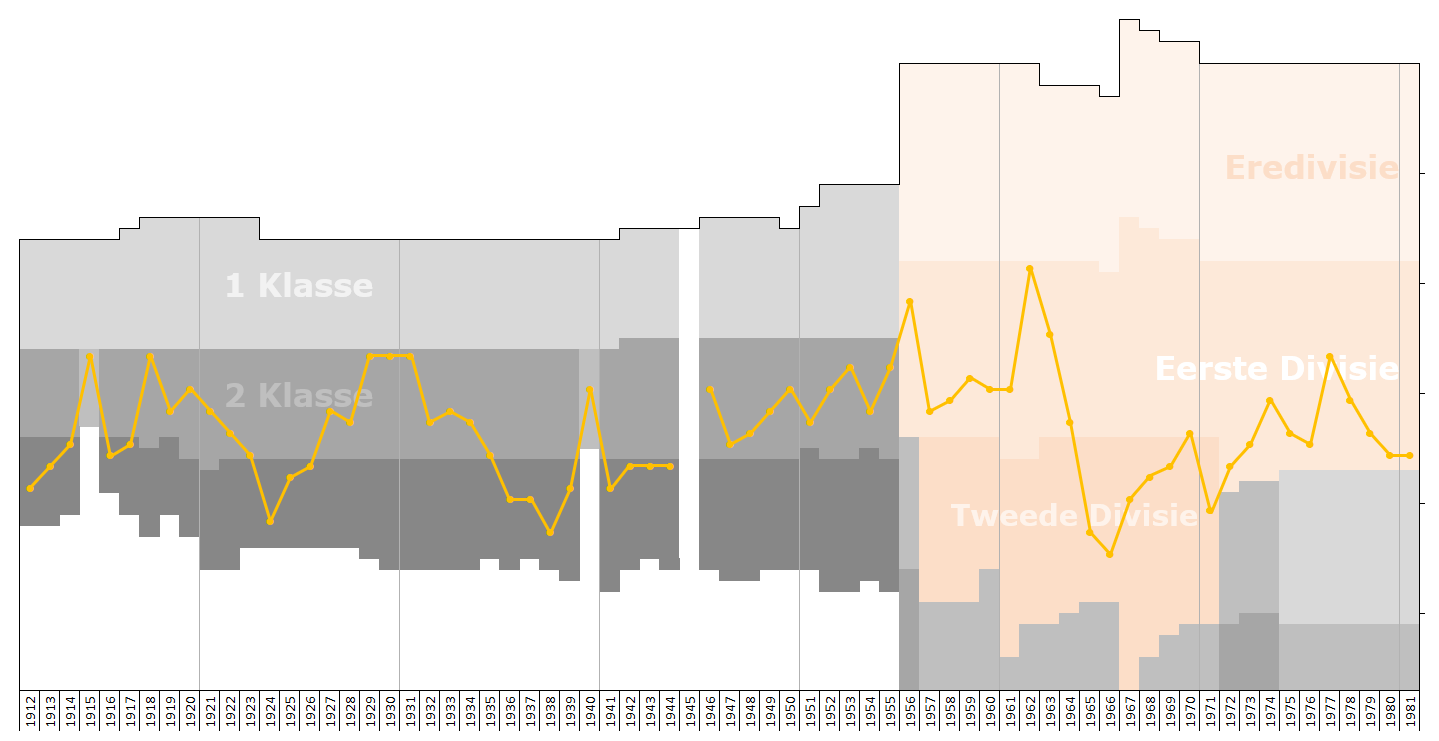
Historical chart of league performance

The club entered the Eerste Divisie in 1956. Fortuna never made it towards the Eredivisie and competed mostly between Eerste and Tweede Divisie. In 1974 the club separated the amateur and the professional branch.

=== FC Vlaardingen ===
The professionals remained as FC Vlaardingen '74 and the amateurs kept playing as Fortuna. In 1981 FC Vlaardingen went bankrupt.

The amateurs merged in 2004 with local club TSB to form the new amateur club Victoria '04.

== Managers ==
- (Netherlands) Puck van Heel (1941–44)
- (Netherlands) Rinus Gosens (1961–64)
- (Netherlands) Maarten Vink (1964–65)
- (Netherlands) Ko Stijger (1965–66)
- (Hungary) Laszlo Zalai (1966–67)
- (Netherlands) Jan Brouwer (1967–70)
- (Netherlands) Piet de Wolf (1970–72)
- (Netherlands) Jan van Baaren (1972–75)
- (Netherlands) Theo Laseroms (1975–79)
- (Netherlands) Hans Dorjee (1979–80)
- (Netherlands) Martin van Vianen (1980)
- (Netherlands) Jan de Gier (1980–81)
- (Netherlands) Gerard Weber (1985–86)
