= Van Hintum =

Van Hintum is a surname. Notable people with the surname include:

- Bart van Hintum (born 1987), Dutch footballer
- Marc van Hintum (born 1967), Dutch footballer
- Saskia van Hintum (born 1970), Dutch volleyball player and coach
