= Martin Laamers =

Dutch footballer (1967–2025)

- Laamers with Gent in 2000

Personal information
- Full name: Arnhem, Netherlands
- Date of birth: 2 August 1967
- Place of birth: Arnhem, Netherlands
- Date of death: 19 August 2025 (aged 58)
- Height: 1.76 m (5 ft 9 in)
- Position: Midfielder

Senior career*
Years	Team	Apps	(Gls)
1984–1986	FC Wageningen	25	(0)
1986–1996	Vitesse	305	(27)
1996–2000	KRC Harelbeke	96	(3)
2000–2002	Gent	12	(0)
Total		438	(30)

International career
1989–1990	Netherlands	2	(0)
- * Club domestic league appearances and goals

Martin Laamers (2 August 1967 – 19 August 2025) was a Dutch professional footballer who played as a midfielder. Laamers played for professional clubs in the Netherlands and Belgium, making over 400 career appearances. At international level, he played twice for the Netherlands national team.

== Career ==
Born in Arnhem, Laamers played for FC Wageningen, Vitesse, KRC Harelbeke and Gent.

Laamers made two appearances for the Netherlands national team between 1989 and 1990.

== Death ==
Laamers died on 19 August 2025, at the age of 58.
