= SBV Vitesse =

Dutch football club

Vitesse
- Full name: Stichting Betaald Voetbal Vitesse Arnhem
- Nicknames: Vites; FC Hollywood at the Rhine; Airborne Football Club
- Founded: 14 May 1892; 134 years ago
- Ground: GelreDome
- Capacity: 21,248
- Owner: De Sterkhouders
- Chairman: Henk Parren
- Head coach: Rüdiger Rehm
- League: Eerste Divisie
- 2025–26: Eerste Divisie, 15th of 20
- Website: www.vitesse.nl
Home colours	Away colours

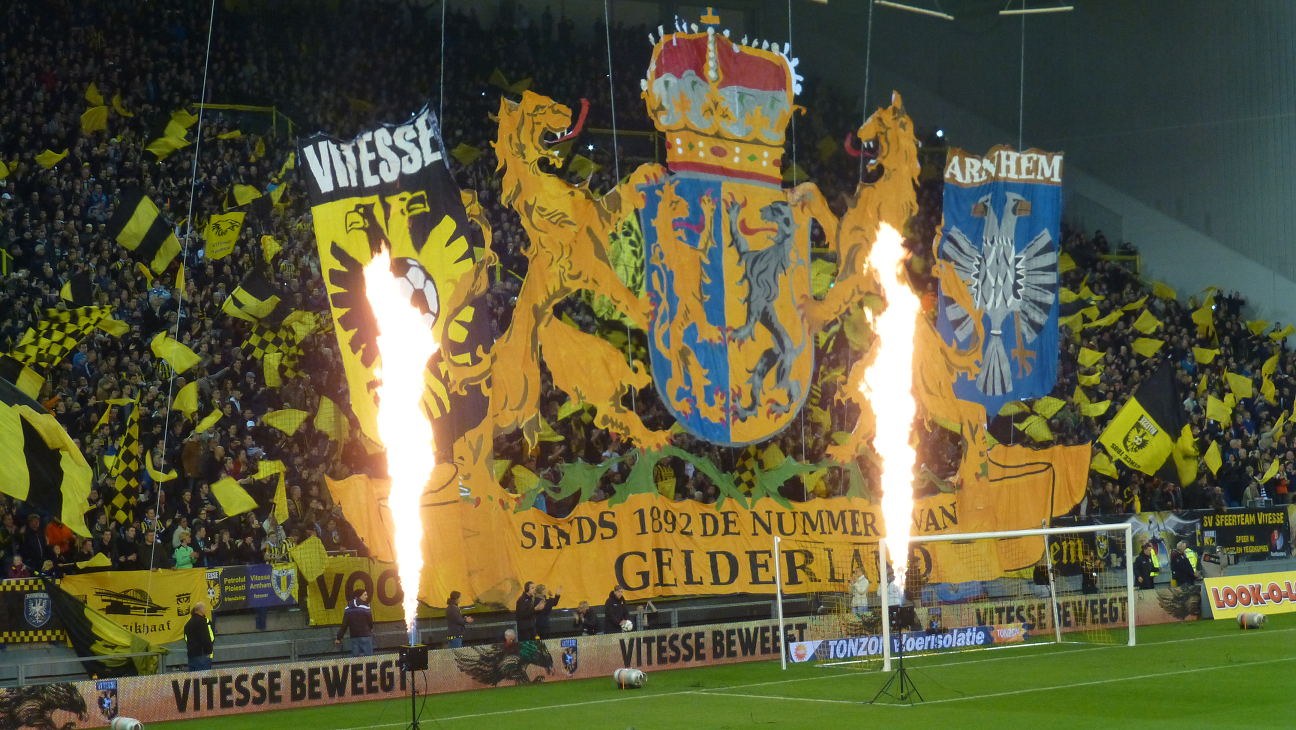
GelreDome Stadium

Stichting Betaald Voetbal Vitesse Arnhem, commonly known as Vitesse (Dutch pronunciation: [viˈtɛsə]) or internationally as Vitesse Arnhem, is a Dutch football club based in Arnhem, Gelderland. Founded on 14 May 1892, it is one of the oldest professional clubs in the Netherlands. Vitesse last competed in the Eerste Divisie, the second tier of the Dutch football league system. Vitesse lost its professional football license in July 2025, but regained it in an appeal in September.

The club experienced its most sustained success in the 1990s, with a highest-ever finish of third place in the 1997–98 Eredivisie season. Vitesse have qualified for European competitions and won their first major trophy in 2017, lifting the KNVB Cup after a 2–0 victory over AZ Alkmaar. They were also cup finalists in 1912, 1927, 1990 and 2021.

Since 1998, Vitesse have played their home matches at the GelreDome, a 21,000-seat stadium featuring a retractable roof and pitch. Former players include Phillip Cocu, Roy Makaay, Nemanja Matić, Wilfried Bony, Martin Ødegaard, Mason Mount and Lois Openda.

== History ==
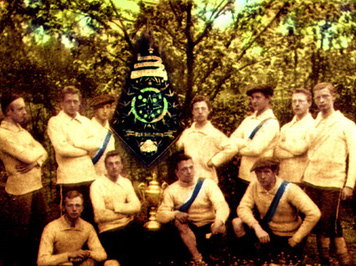
Vitesse's first squad in 1896.

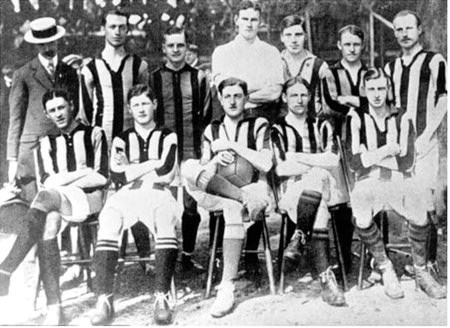
Vitesse's first squad in 1913.

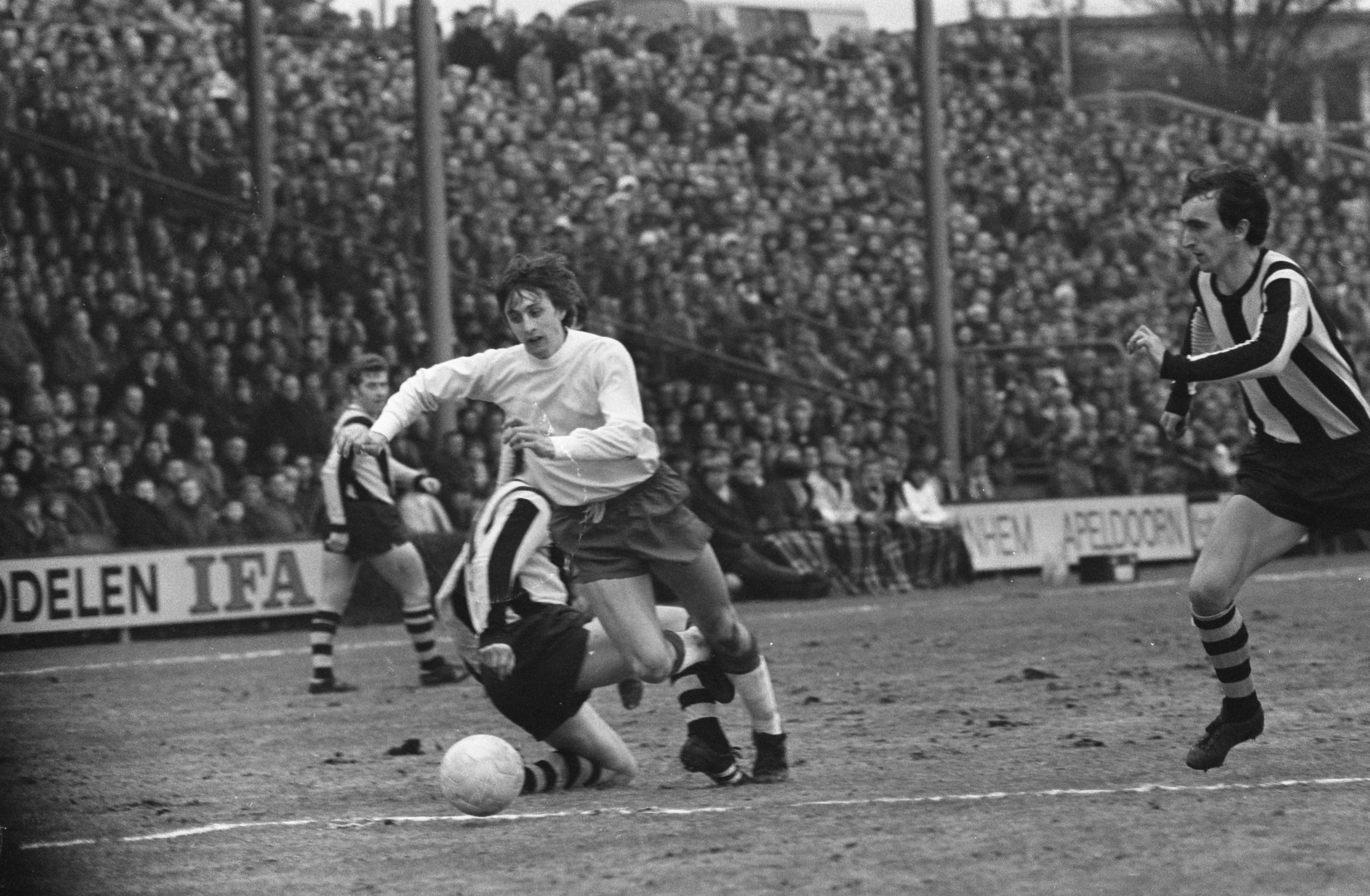
Against AFC Ajax in the 1970 Dutch Cup match.

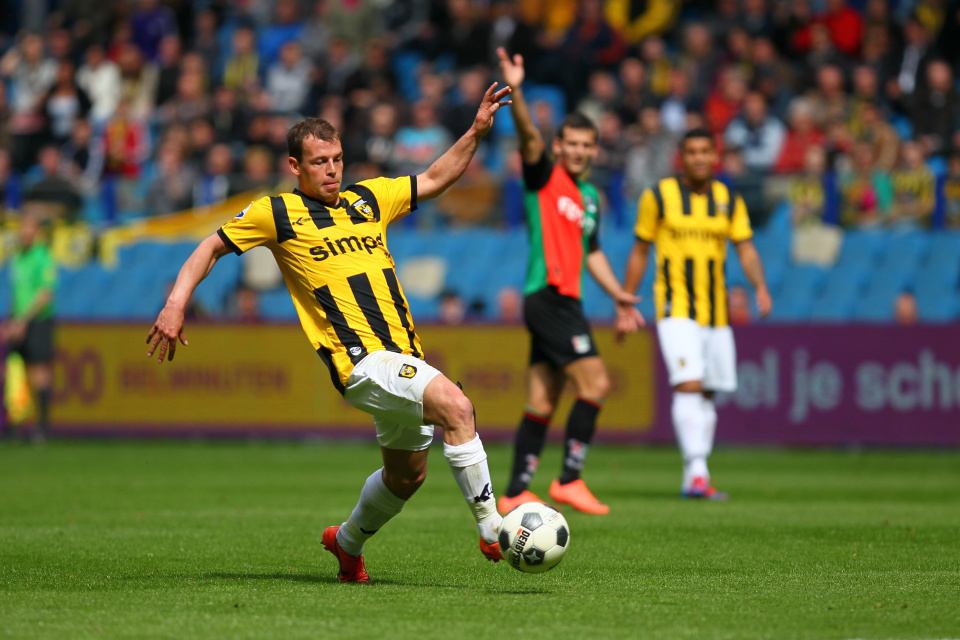
Nicky Hofs played for Vitesse 194 matches. He was the cousin of Bennie Hofs and Henk Hofs.

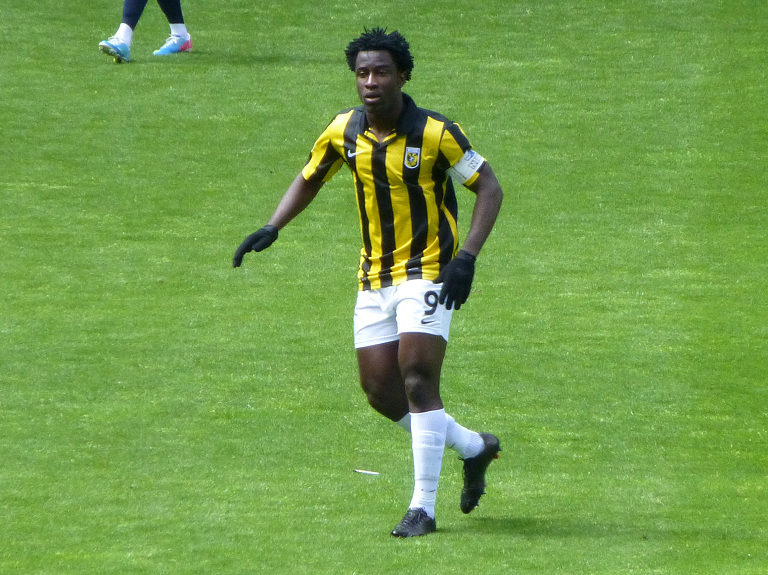
Wilfried Bony was awarded the Golden Shoe for the best player in the Netherlands.

Vitesse, founded in 1892, is the second oldest professional football club still in professional football in the Netherlands, after Sparta Rotterdam who were formed in 1888. The roots of Vitesse actually pre-date Sparta by a year as in 1887, a club with the name "Arnhemsche cricket- en voetbalvereeniging Vitesse" was formed by a group of high school students who played their sport on the Rijnkade, overlooking the River Rhine in the city centre. Reluctant to choose a Latin or English name for the club as they felt those languages were too elitist, they picked the French word Vitesse, meaning "speed".

In 1891 the club disbanded as they were no longer able to find anywhere suitable to play cricket after a velodrome was built on their usual playing field in the Klarenbeek Park. The following year a group of wealthy students resurrected the sports club, this time with the name AVC (Arnhemse Voetbal en Cricketclub) Vitesse. In the summer they played cricket and in the winter football. At the end of 1892, Vitesse played its first real football match, and in 1894 Vitesse disbanded the cricket branch. In 1895 and 1896 Vitesse became champions of the Gelderland competition. From the foundation of the Netherlands national football championship in 1898 until 1954, the title was decided by play-offs by a handful of clubs who had previously won their regional league. Vitesse lost the final of the national championship six times (1898, 1899, 1903, 1913, 1914 and 1915).

In 1912 Vitesse reached the final of the Dutch Cup Tournament for the first time. Vitesse lost the final 0–2 against HFC Haarlem. In this period Vitesse had top players, such as Willem Hesselink and Just Göbel, who were also active in the Netherlands national team. In 1914 John William Sutcliffe became the first foreign trainer.

During World War II, Vitesse did not play official matches because playing football in the open air was forbidden. During the Battle of Arnhem, the residents of the city were forcibly evicted from their homes, allowing the Germans to turn the north bank of the Rhine into a heavily defended line. Residents were not allowed to return home without a permit and most did not return until after the war. The football field and clubhouse were completely destroyed. The damage was repaired in the years after the liberation.

In 1984 it was decided to divide the professional and amateur sections of the club. The professional section was renamed SBV (Stichting Betaald Voetbal – "Professional Football Foundation") Vitesse whilst the amateur section became "Vitesse 1892", which lasted until they went bankrupt in 2009.

From 1984, Karel Aalbers was the president of SBV Vitesse. Aalbers' goal was to bring Vitesse from the bottom of the Second League (Eerste Divisie, now Keuken Kampioen Divisie), the league in which the club originated, to become one of the top 40 football clubs of Europe. He developed the basic idea for the 'GelreDome', a stadium with a sliding pitch that can be moved out of the building. Later, the same system was applied in Gelsenkirchen (Schalke 04) and in Japan. Events such as pop concerts can be held without damaging the grass. Gelredome opened on 25 March 1998, when Vitesse played NAC and won 4-1. It has a roof that can be opened and closed, and is fully climate controlled as well. In the first season after the opening, Gelredome's attendance rose to 20,000, (from less than 8,000 in the old stadium).

Vitesse made their debut in European competitions in 1990. The club won their first match in the first round 1–0 over Derry City.

The club remained financially sound through making notable profits on the transfer market. Players such as Roy Makaay, Sander Westerveld, Nikos Machlas, Glenn Helder and Phillip Cocu were sold for large sums of money. Others came to occupy empty player positions, such as Mahamadou Diarra and Pierre van Hooijdonk. Vitesse finished in the top four positions, made profits and showed a solid balance sheet in the final years of Aalbers' presidency. Also, the club became regular competitors in the UEFA Cup and in 1997–1998 finished third in the Eredivise, its record highest finish to date.

Herbert Neumann was Vitesse's manager over most of these years (1992–95 and 1998–99), while star players included: Nikos Machlas, the first ever Vitesse player to win the European Golden Boot in 1998 when he scored 34 goals in a season; John van den Brom, who played 378 matches for Vitesse during this period scoring 110 goals from midfield; and Edward Sturing, who played 383 matches in defence for Vitesse from 1987 to 1998, as well as receiving 3 caps for the Netherlands national team. Additional stars included Dejan Čurović, who spent six years at Vitesse playing 109 matches as a striker, scoring 41 goals including the first goal in GelreDome. Meanwhile, Dutch forward Roy Makaay spent four years at Vitesse, scoring 42 goals in 109 matches between 1993 and 1997.

Aalbers was forced to resign on 15 February 2000, after the main sponsor, Nuon, threatened to pull the plug if he did not. Nuon, as a public utility company owned by local authorities, had trouble explaining why it invested heavily in Aalbers' ambitious plans. Eventually, Nuon pulled the plug on Vitesse in 2001, and the club had to be saved by a group of investors. After Aalbers' resignation, Jan Konings (former chief of Sara Lee/DE) was named interim president until a new candidate could be found. Four months later, Vaessen was named president and Konings resigned. In a short period of time, Vitesse began to show negative financial results due to poor deals on the transfer market. The club had to be saved again in 2003, with the county providing a loan. The club survived numerous financial crises, such as the one in 2008, when debts were bought off, under the threat of bankruptcy.

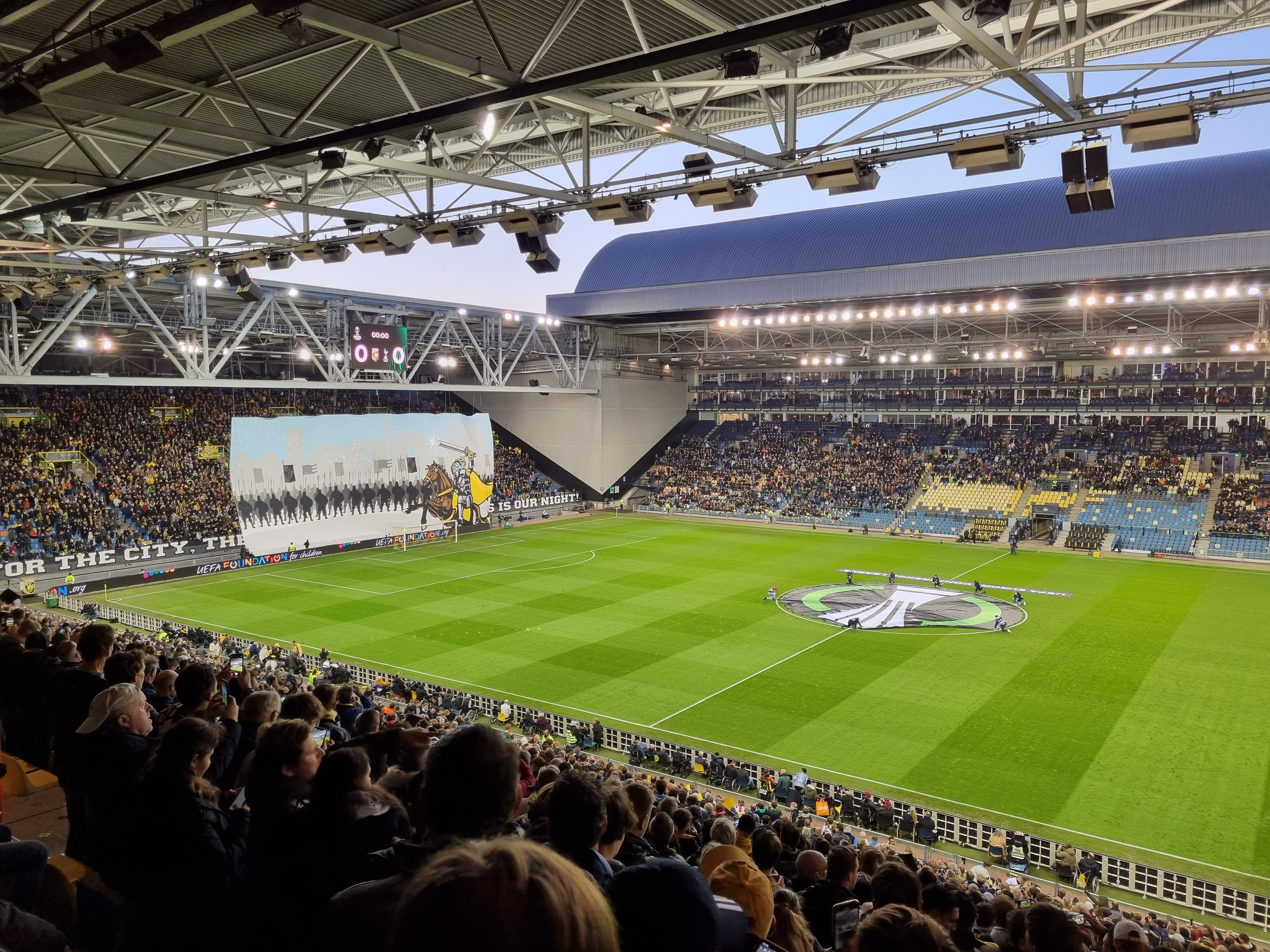
Fully packed Gelredome during a 1–0 victory against Tottenham Hotspur in the UEFA Europa Conference League at 21 October 2021.

The club was in serious financial trouble, and in August 2010 its majority shareholder agreed to sell the club to the Georgian businessman Merab Jordania. There were reports in The Guardian and various news outlets that this purchase was engineered by former Chelsea owner Roman Abramovich.

On 1 July 2012, Fred Rutten signed a contract as the new manager of Vitesse for the season 2012-13. Rutten left Vitesse after the season, finishing in fourth place. Wilfried Bony ended the season as the Eredivisie's top scorer with 31 goals in 30 matches and was awarded the Golden Shoe for the best player in the Netherlands.

For the 2013–14 season, Vitesse appointed Peter Bosz as its new manager. In October 2013, Merab Jordania sold his shares in the club to Russian billionaire Alexander Tsjigirinski. In November 2013, Vitesse was top of the league in the Eredivisie for the first time since 2006. It was the first time since 2000 they'd been top of the league later than the first week. Halfway through the season, after 17 matches, Vitesse was the leader in the competition. Key players in the squad from this period included Davy Pröpper, Christian Atsu and Bertrand Traoré.

Vitesse announced on 13 June 2016 that Henk Fraser would replace Bosz at the start of the 2016–17 season. In his first full season, he won the club's first major trophy in its 125-year existence. Fraser defeated AZ by a score of 2−0 in the final of the KNVB Cup, with two goals from Ricky van Wolfswinkel. On 5 August 2017 Vitesse were beaten 1–1 (4–2 pen.) at De Kuip, Rotterdam in the Johan Cruyff Shield final by Feyenoord. In the 2017–18 UEFA Europa League group stage, Vitesse's opponents were Lazio, Nice and Zulte Waregem. Vitesse ultimately finished the group stage in fourth place. In October 2017, Guram Kashia wore a rainbow-striped captain's armband for Vitesse against Heracles Almelo in support of LGBT rights, leading to a backlash in his own country. In August 2018, he became the inaugural recipient of UEFA's #EqualGame award for his act. In 2018, board member Valeri Oyf bought the club, with apparent financial help from Roman Abramovich.

In 2021, after beating VVV-Venlo in the semi-final, Vitesse reached the KNVB Cup Final for the fifth time in their history. Vitesse lost the final 2–1 to Ajax. Vitesse finished the 2020–21 Eredivise season in fourth place. In July and August 2021, Vitesse qualified for the UEFA Europa Conference League. Vitesse knocked-out Dundalk (2-2 and 2–1) and Anderlecht (3-3 and 2–1) in the qualifiers. On 27 August, Vitesse was drawn on Group G of the 2021–22 UEFA Europa Conference League alongside Tottenham Hotspur, Rennes and Mura. Vitesse eventually placed second in the group, advancing to the knockout round play-offs. Vitesse won the knockout round play-offs against Rapid Wien 3-2 on aggregate before losing to AS Roma in the round of 16.

=== License issues ===
In 2022, after the Russian invasion of Ukraine, owner Valeri Oyf decided to sell the club. A deal was reached between Oyf and Coley Parry, an American investor. After a lengthy investigation, the KNVB eventually rejected the sale, despite Parry having already invested millions into the club. Parry then demanded the money back from Vitesse. Guus Franke, a Dutch businessman, negotiated with Parry regarding the debts and a potential takeover of Vitesse. That deal eventually collapsed. A deal was finally reached in 2025, with a group of 5 investors all taking a minority share and Parry fully withdrawing from the club.

Towards the end of the 2023–24 Eredivisie season, Vitesse was relegated after an eighteen‑point deduction imposed by the KNVB for failing to comply with licensing requirements amid ongoing financial issues related to the club's sale. During the 2024–25 Eerste Divisie season, Vitesse received a further 39‑point deduction, of which 12 were for the 2025-26 season due to appeal rules, which contributed to their bottom‑place finish. In the aftermath, the KNVB initiated proceedings in June 2025 to revoke the club's professional license, citing unresolved financial irregularities related to investor Coley Parry, and on 11 June revoked the license, with Vitesse appealing the decision. Another response came in the form of a proposed takeover led by Dutch regional investors under "Plan Sterkhouders", chaired by Michel Shaay, aimed at restoring the club's financial stability. Vitesse signed a cooperation agreement with CROP accountants on 4 June. On 21 June the regional investors and foreign owners reached an agreement subject to KNVB approval, which—if ratified—would have marked Vitesse's return to Dutch ownership for the first time since 2010. On the same day, Rüdiger Rehm was appointed as the club's new manager. The club submitted a temporary budget proposal for the deadline of 16 June and had until 3 July to supplement it. On 9 July, the club was deducted 12 points for the upcoming season due to a failed appeal. Timo Braasch, interim director and one of the 5 owners of the club, stepped down on 27 July as director in an apparent attempt to appease the KNVB ahead of the appeal ruling. On 31 July 2025 the club officially lost its appeal and was no longer a professional club, with the Royal Dutch Football Association claiming that the "Plan Sterkhouders" agreement came too late. The club went to court to try to get its license back. An emergency hearing took place on 7 August in Utrecht, a day before the new season started, with the decision being made public on 8 August. The club's efforts were supported by supporters and the community of Arnhem, including a special bus transport from Arnhem to the courthouse in Utrecht. On the day of the trial, the court accepted requests from supporters and social organizations to add themselves to the lawsuit.

The emergency hearing began on 7 August 2025 at 13:30 in the court of Middle-Netherlands in Utrecht. Club icons, such as Karel Aalbers, John van den Brom, Nicky Hofs, Theo Janssen, Jan Snellenburg, and Edward Sturing and people involved with the current organization of the club, such as Timo Braasch, Michel Shaay, and the current squad appeared at the court to attend the hearing. According to Vitesse's, Shaay's, and the supporters' lawyers, the KNVB was too harsh with their penalty and did not have ground for the decision, since Vitesse informed the KNVB of everything. They also argued the penalty was out of proportion, citing the 2016 FC Twente case. The KNVB lawyers' pushed back, arguing that it had the right to punish Vitesse in this way, cited examples of Vitesse not informing the KNVB, and said that the FC Twente case was not applicable. The next day, the court announced that Vitesse had lost the emergency hearing. Michel Shaay, who is still eyeing to become owner of Vitesse, said there are plans to continue as an amateur club using the team's youth divisions. Before the end of the month, Vitesse announced that its first team would not take part in any competition in the 2025-26 season, but that it would continue playing in the youth divisions. At the end of August, protesting supporters of the club threw smoke bombs during two matches in the Eerste Divisie to protest the KNVB's decision.

On 3 September 2025, Vitesse provisionally regained their licence as they won an appeal. According to the court of Arnhem-Leeuwarden, the decision to revoke Vitesse's licence came under a large amount of time crunch, due to which the procedures were not followed carefully enough, and the court working on the proceedings on the merits has a chance of ruling as such. Per this decision, Vitesse were to be let back into the league immediately. Since this decision was a turbo-urgent appeal, the club does not fully get their licence back, as that decision will be decided by the proceedings on the merits at a later date. After the result of the appeal was made public, a lot of amateur and out-of-contract players reported to Vitesse to try and further their careers.

The club began the 2025-26 Eerste Divisie season on -12 points, a result of appeal rules. Towards the end of the season, the club had a chance to gain promotion due to "period titles" of the Eerste Divisie. On the 1st of May 2026, protector-general Assink advised the Supreme Court of the Netherlands in support of the lower court's decision to suspend the KNVB ruling, ahead of a decision by the court regarding the KNVB's appeal. Later that month, the owners tried to fire the board and management of the club, but those refused to be fired, stating sale conditions as the reason. On the 22nd of May, the KNVB allowed the sale of the club to De Sterkhouders.

== Stadium and training facilities ==
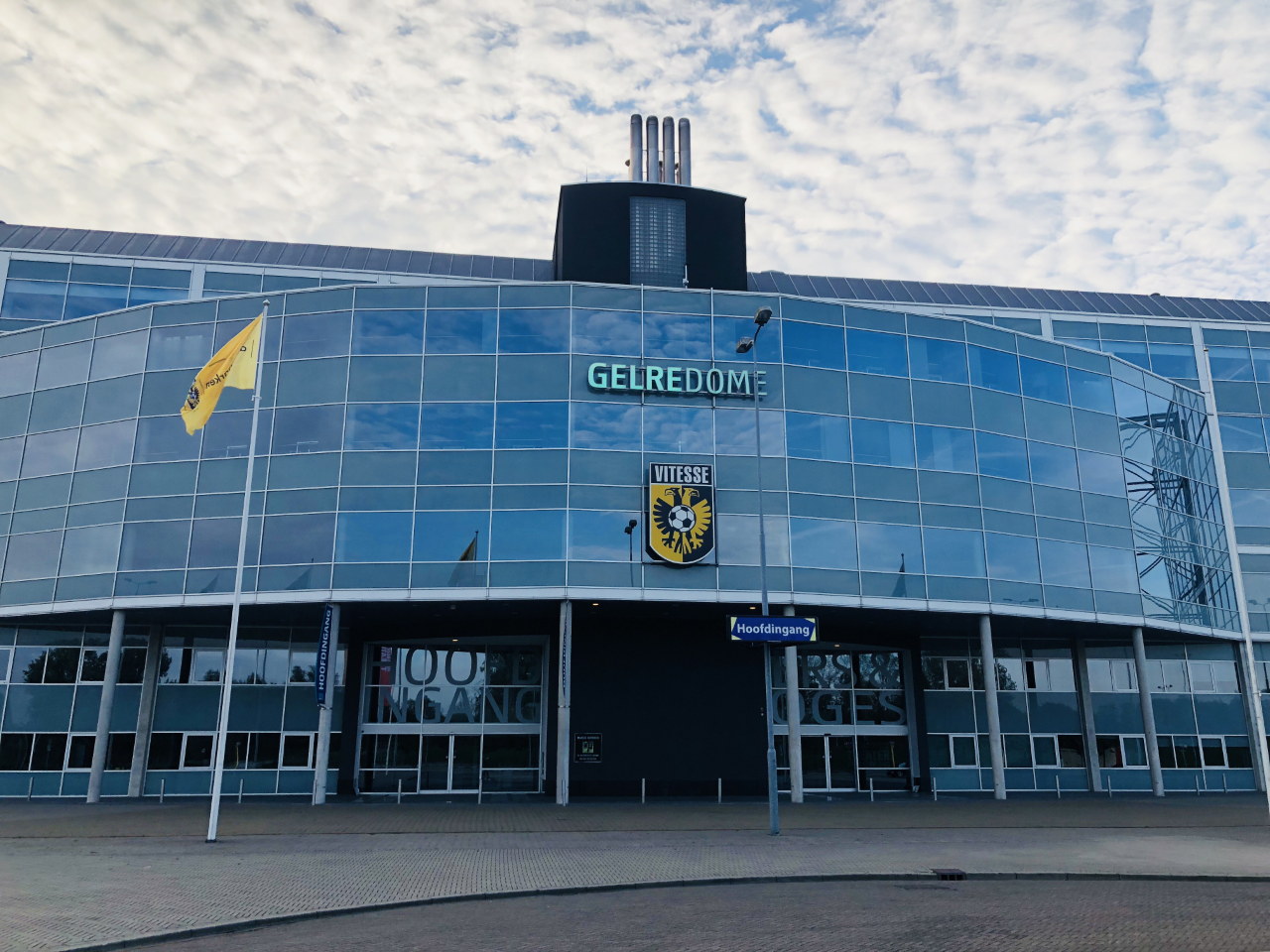
GelreDome with closed roof and pitch outside.

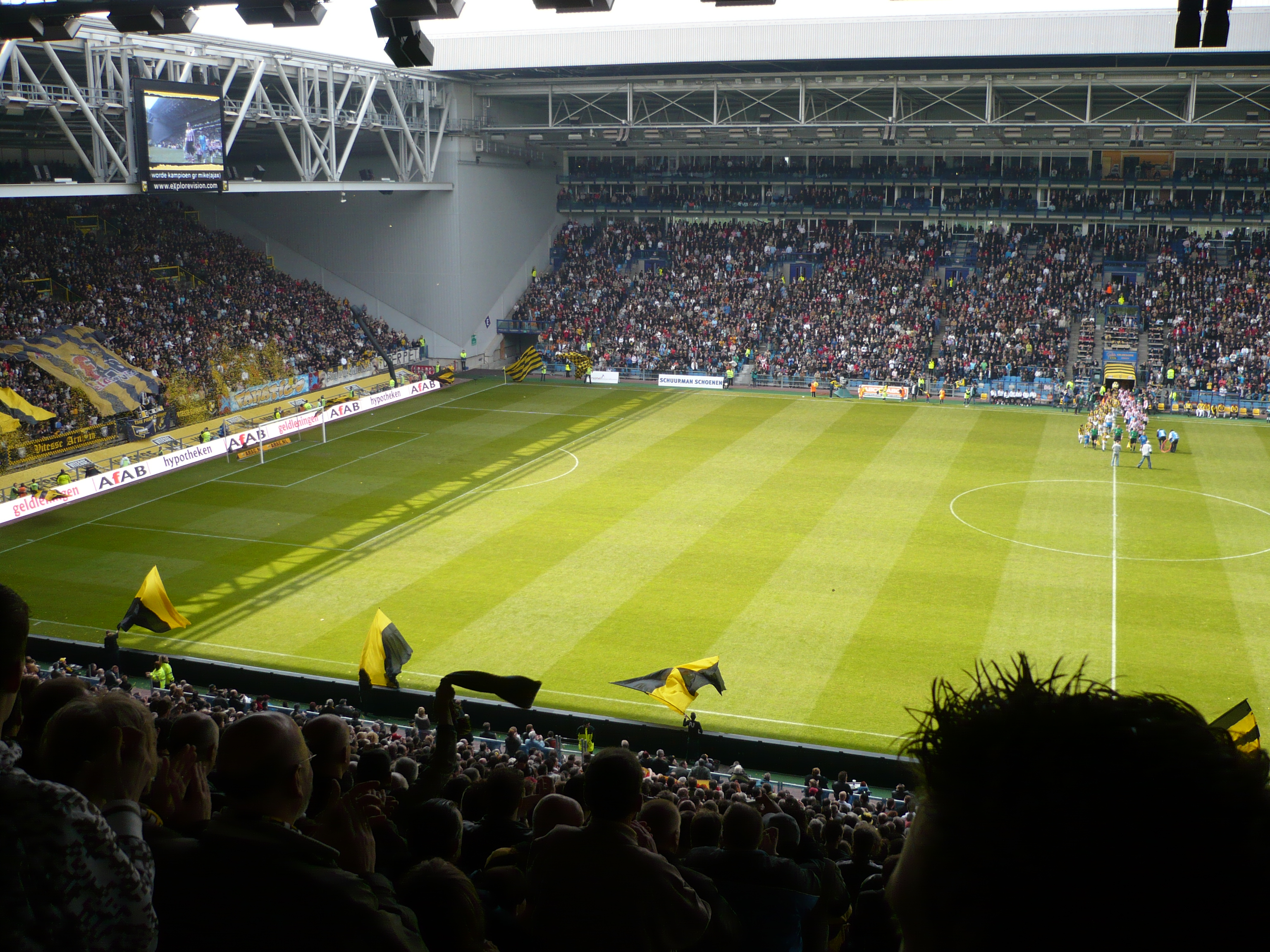
GelreDome Stadium

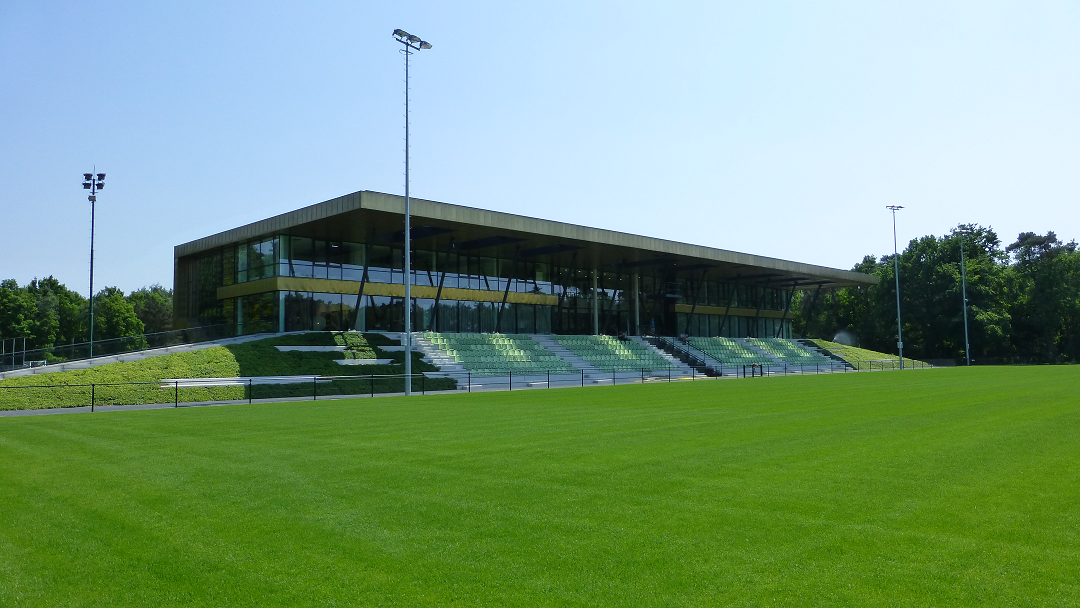
Training accommodation at Papendal

The club plays its home games at the GelreDome stadium, with a capacity of 21,248 seats. The GelreDome was built to serve as a multifunctional stadium suited for sports, concerts and other events. It was the first football stadium in the world to have a retractable pitch, and, after the Amsterdam ArenA, the second stadium in Europe to have a sliding roof. The pitch is surrounded on each side by four covered all-seater stands, officially known as the Edward Sturing Stand (North), Charly Bosveld Stand (East), Theo Bos Stand (South) and Just Göbel Stand (West).

The idea of building a multifunctional stadium, which had more than doubled the capacity of Vitesse's old Nieuw Monnikenhuize stadium, came from former Vitesse chairman Karel Aalbers. The ambitious chairman had been playing with the idea from as early as the late 1980s, but it took until 1996 and the prospect of the upcoming Euro 2000 championships for construction to finally begin. The GelreDome opened two years later, on 25 March 1998, with a league match between Vitesse and NAC Breda (4–1). Three international matches of the Netherlands national football team were played in the stadium, the first one being on 27 May 1998: a friendly against Cameroon (0–1). The last one, played on 26 April 2000, was also a friendly: a 0–0 against Scotland. In 2019, the Netherlands women's national team, also played their international (friendly) match at the stadium. Furthermore, the GelreDome was the location for three UEFA Euro 2000 group stage matches, as well as the 2007 UEFA European Under-21 Championship tournament.

Vitesse's training facilities are conducted at National Sports Centre Papendal, located in the outskirts of Arnhem in woodland surroundings. The training ground consists of several pitches, a number of which have an artificial turf pitch, and extensive training facilities, including a fitness centre. Papendal, a mere twelve kilometers north of the GelreDome, is not only the training facility for Vitesse's first team; the youth teams play their home matches here as well. Its main field has seating capacity for 500 people. The complex is situated in large wooded area, where the players can prepare in a peaceful and private environment, whilst not being too far from the hustle and bustle of Arnhem's city centre. Papendal is also the base for administration staff, scouting department and all club coaches.

=== Stadium history ===
Name	Years
Rijnkade / Klarenbeek Park	1887–1891
Molenbeekstraat	1892
IJsclub Boulevard Heuvelink	1892–1894
Bronbeek Royal Palace	1893
Paasweide	1894–1896
Klarenbeek Stadium	1896–1915
Monnikenhuize	1915–1950
Nieuw Monnikenhuize	1950–1997
GelreDome	1998–present

== Symbols ==
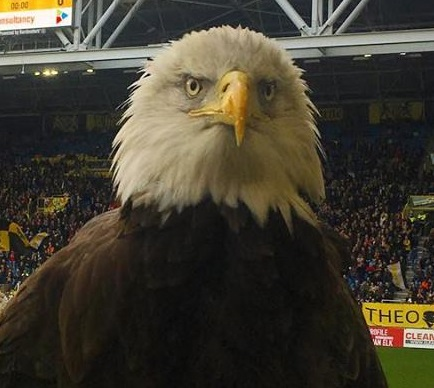
Vitesse's crest is composed of an eagle.

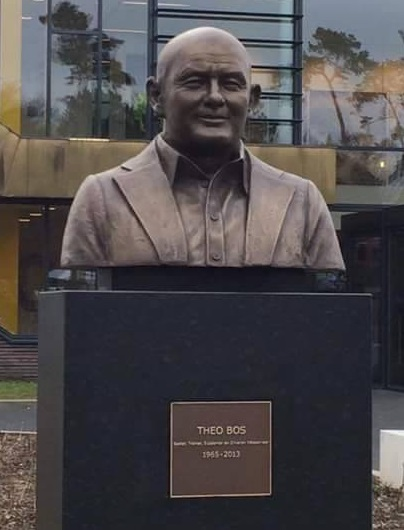
Mister Vitesse Theo Bos

=== Hertog ===
Vitesse are well known for the American bald Eagle 'Hertog', which is released before the match and flies over the crowds.

=== Anthems ===
Vitesse fans are known to be creative and have various songs and chants during matches. Among the most important Vitesse songs are "Geel en Zwart zijn onze kleuren" by Emile Hartkamp (which was the anthem until 2017), "Ernems Trots" by Joey Hartkamp and Emile Hartkamp (which is the current anthem), and "Bouw mee aan een steengoed Vites!" by Henk Bleker & Enka Harmonie. Vitesse opens its home matches with "Whatever You Want" by Status Quo, and after every home goal "Bro Hymn" by Pennywise is played.

=== Mr Vitesse ===
Theo Bos was raised in Arnhem and started playing football from an early age. He began his career at amateur club Sv Sempre Avanti and played from 1979 to 1983 in the academy of Vitesse. Manager Leen Looijen gave him his professional debut on 13 August 1983 against FC Wageningen; the match ended in a 3–0 victory for Vitesse. Bos spent his entire playing career for Vitesse, making a total 369 appearances in 14 seasons with his club. After his playing career, Bos worked at Vitesse as youth coach, assistant coach and manager. He is therefore considered to be Mister Vitesse. In 2012, the south stand of the GelreDome stadium was named the Theo Bos Stand. Bos died on 28 February 2013 of pancreatic cancer, aged forty-seven. Following his death, a special remembrance to honour Theo Bos took place at Gelredome with around 7,000 Vitesse supporters. After the 2012–13 season, no player will wear the number 4 shirt at Vitesse after the club decided to retire the shirt out of respect for Theo Bos, "the legendary number four". Dutch defender Jan-Arie van der Heijden was the last player to wear the number. In November 2013, his biography Het is zoals het is ('It is what it is') was published, written by journalist Marcel van Roosmalen. In 2015, a statue of Bos was erected outside of the training complex at Papendal.

=== Airborne-match ===
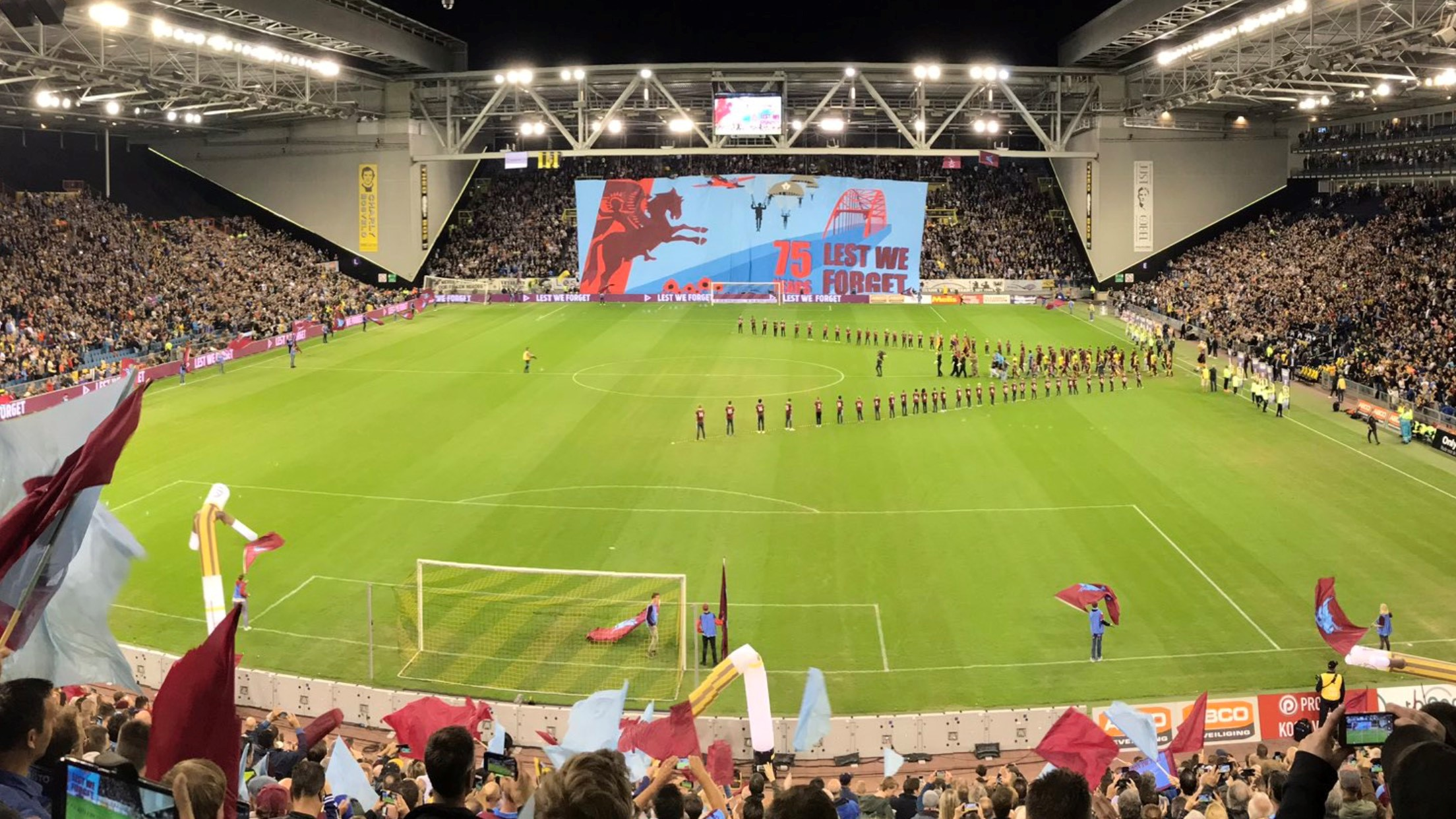
The 'Airborne memorial' football match

Around September there is an annual 'Airborne memorial' football match. During this annual Airborne-match the veterans of World War II are honoured. The Gelredome is decorated with Airborne flags, both outside and inside the stadium, and at halftime, 120 members of the Royal British Legion play bagpipes with some other musical guests. Club symbol Hertog flies with the typical Airborne colours. The match is traditionally visited by veterans who fought in this battle, while a special shirt is worn by Vitesse. The club drop their normal striped black and yellow kit for this special match. Instead they wear claret and blue outfits, the same colours of the 1st Airborne Division, with a 1st Airborne 'winged horse' emblem also etched on the kit. Pictured on the collar sticker is the John Frost Bridge. These shirts are after the match auctioned for charity. In addition, Vitesse wears a special captain's armband as a sign of recognition and respect for those who have "fought for our freedom". In the 2014–15 and 2019–20 seasons, Vitesse played their away games in the same colours of the 1st Airborne Division.

=== Colours and badge ===
Originally, Vitesse played in white shirts with a blue sash from inception until 1900, paying hommage to the city's colours. At the turn of the century, player Reinhard Jan Christiaan baron van Pallandt offered to sponsor the club's shirts in exchange for Vitesse switching to his family colours of black and yellow. The board were quick to accept, noting that Vitesse, being one of the strongest team in the province of Gelderland, would be vindicated in playing in what could also be considered the province's colours (the flag of Gelderland is a tricolour in blue, yellow, and black).

The first logo of Vitesse was a shield-shaped crest. In the middle there was a diagonal dividing line between the left yellow face and the right black box. In the left box, "Vitesse" was diagonally written and in the right-hand side, "1892 ", the club's founding year. This logo underwent minor redesigns and was replaced in 1984, the year in which the professional branch and the amateur branch separated. The amateur branch retained the logo with limited modification, while SBV Vitesse got a new logo.

The new logo of the professional club from 1984 was once again a shield-shaped figure, but it had straight lines at both the top and sides of the logo. At the top was a black box with thick white uppercase Vitesse. Under the name is a double-headed eagle counterchanged on a black and yellow field. This double-headed eagle can also be found in the coat of arms of Arnhem. In the middle of the logo is a football.

In 2012, a new version of the logo was put into use; a total of 13 changes were made. For example, the symmetry of the eagle was improved, the black outer edge replaced by a white and the writing has been made thinner. The football has been altered in terms of appearance as a shadow effect is added and (if the context allows it) the year of creation as text EST. 1892 under the logo can be found.

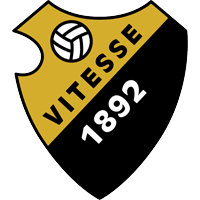
The first Vitesse crest

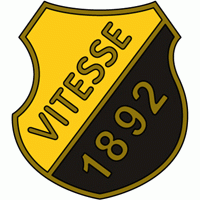
Used until 1984

1984–2012

2012–present

=== Kit manufacturers and sponsors ===
Since 2023 Vitesse's kit has been manufactured by Robey. Previous manufacturers include Adidas (1982–89), Hummel (1989–90), Bukta (1990–91), Diadora (1991–93), Umbro (1993–97), Lotto (1997–99), Uhlsport (1999–05), Quick (2005–06), Legea (2006–09), Klupp (2009–12), Nike (2012–14), Macron (2014–19), Nike (2019–23) and Robey (2023-present).

The club's shirts are currently sponsored by BetCity. Previous commercial sponsors have been Akai (1982–83), Oad Reizen (1983–85), Spitman (1985–86), Schoenenreus (1987–89), RTL 4 (1990–1991), PTT Telecom (1991–92), BFI (1991–92), Spaarenergie (1992–93), Nuon Energy (1993–01), ATAG Benelux (2000–01), SITA (2002–03), Hubo (2002–03), Bavaria (2002–03), SBS6 (2002–03), Sunweb Group (2003–04), AFAB (2004–2010), Zuka.nl (2010–2011), Simpel (2011–12), Youfone (2013–14), Truphone (2014–17), SWOOP (2017–18), Droomparken (2018–19), Royal Burgers' Zoo (2019–20), The Netherlands Open Air Museum (2019–20), Waterontharder.com (2020–21) eToro (2021–23) and BetCity (2023–present).

== Rivalries ==
=== Rivalry with NEC ===
N.E.C. from Nijmegen are Vitesse's archrivals. The two clubs share a long history together and matches between the two clubs are called the Gelderse Derby (Derby of Gelderland). The rivalry between these two clubs goes beyond the football rivalry, it transcends into the city rivalry between the two largest cities of Gelderland: Nijmegen and Arnhem. This city rivalry began when these two cities first received their city rights. The two cities are just 15 kilometres apart, leading to an intense feeling of a cross-town rivalry, heightened by a feeling that local pride is at stake. The meeting between the two teams is still considered to be one of the biggest matches of the season.

The inhabitants of these cities differ extremely in both attitudes and cultures which is clearly reflected on the football pitch. Vitesse's style of play has long been a source of pride for the supporters, and one of irritation for the NEC fans.

Since 1813, Arnhem has been the capital of Gelderland, historically based on finance and trade. Arnhem is perceived as an office city with modern buildings. Nijmegen, on the other hand, is predominantly a workers' city, with middle and high-income groups in the minority. People from Nijmegen see Arnhem as arrogant and lazy.

Statistics
Competition	Matches	Wins		Draws	Goals	
Competition	Matches	Vitesse	NEC	Draws	Vitesse	NEC
Eredivisie	58	23	19	16	73	62
Eerste divisie	14	2	6	6	18	27
Tweede divisie	4	0	3	1	3	9
Eerste klasse	8	1	6	1	9	23
Tweede klasse	4	2	1	1	7	5
KNVB Cup	5	0	3	2	3	9
Play-offs	6	4	1	1	9	4
Total	99	32	39	28	122	139

=== Rivalries with other clubs ===
De Graafschap are also a rival of Vitesse, but in terms of tension and rivalry, these matches are not as loaded as the duels with NEC Nijmegen. The rivalry has existed for some time with De Graafschap and stems from various causes, such as the opposition between the large city (Arnhem) and the countryside (Doetinchem).

Further teams who share a rivalry with Vitesse include Twente, Utrecht and Ajax. Past rivalries include local derbies between Vitesse and clubs such as FC Wageningen, Go Ahead Eagles, Quick 1888, Arnhemse Boys and VV Rheden. However, due to the clubs playing in different leagues for an extended period of time and/or clubs being abolished, tensions between these clubs have settled.

== Players ==
=== Current squad ===
As of 16 September 2026

Note: Flags indicate national team as defined under FIFA eligibility rules; some limited exceptions apply. Players may hold more than one non-FIFA nationality.

No.	Pos.	Nation	Player
1	GK	NED	Connor van den Berg
2	DF	NED	Solomon Bonnah
6	MF	GER	Marco Schikora
7	FW	NED	Nino Zonneveld
8	MF	GER	Ricardo-Felipe Schwarz
9	FW	NED	Naoufal Bannis
11	MF	ISR	Yuval Ranon
13	FW	POR	João Pinto
14	DF	NED	Omar Achouitar
15	DF	NED	Luuk Wouters
16	DF	SWE	Pontus Dahbo (on loan from BK Häcken)
17	DF	KOS	Valon Zumberi
19	FW	NED	Jeredy Hilterman
20	MF	SUI	Filipe de Carvalho

No.	Pos.	Nation	Player
21	FW	NED	Ayman Sellouf
22	DF	NED	Xiamaro Thenu
23	GK	NED	Jayden Siecker
24	DF	CUW	Nathan Markelo
25	GK	CUW	Tyrick Bodak
27	FW	GER	Eduard Probst
28	DF	NED	Alexander Büttner (captain)
31	GK	GER	Maximilian Brüll
33	MF	NED	Mathijs Marschalk
34	MF	NED	Youssef Ouallil
38	MF	NED	Koen te Veluwe
42	MF	NED	Teun Bosch
43	DF	NED	Chiel Olde Keizer
55	DF	NED	Marcus Steffen

=== Academy players with first-team appearances ===
Note: Flags indicate national team as defined under FIFA eligibility rules; some limited exceptions apply. Players may hold more than one non-FIFA nationality.

No.	Pos.	Nation	Player
—	GK	NED	Lishairo Brudet
—	DF	NED	Geronimo Londar

No.	Pos.	Nation	Player
—	MF	NED	Sem Pepers

=== Retired numbers ===
4	(Netherlands) Theo Bos, defender (1983–98), posthumous honour
12	Club Supporters (the 12th Man)
13	Vito, the official team mascot

=== Youth teams ===
The club is famous, however, for its Youth Academy, which is rated with the maximum of 4 Stars by the KNVB. Many players in professional football in Europe have played at Vitesse in the past including Roy Makaay, Robin Gosens, Ricky van Wolfswinkel, Davy Pröpper, Alexander Büttner, Stijn Schaars, Peter Bosz, Marco van Ginkel, Theo Janssen, Erwin Mulder, Eloy Room, Piet Velthuizen, Martin Laamers, Nicky Hofs and Mitchell van Bergen. All youth teams train and play their matches at Papendal.

The Vitesse Academy comprises age-group teams ranging from U8's up to the flagship U19's. The youngest players are scouted at amateur clubs in the direct surroundings of Arnhem. For the age of twelve and older, the academy extends its scouting area, mainly to the remaining part of the Netherlands and Germany. In Vitesse's youth system, efficient and qualified training is done by full-time coaches and organized by further employees looking after the administration. The goal of the sporting education is to train the youths from basic to development to performance levels, for them to fulfill the sportive and non sportive demands of professional football.

== Former players ==
=== National team players ===
The following players were called up to represent their national teams in international football and received caps during their tenure with Vitesse:

- **Albania**
  - (Albania) Armando Broja (2020–2021)
- **Algeria**
  - (Algeria) Anis Hadj Moussa (2024)
- **Belgium**
  - (Belgium) Loïs Openda (2020–2022)
  - (Belgium) Bob Peeters (2000–2003)
- **Bosnia & Herzegovina**
  - (Bosnia and Herzegovina) Saïd Hamulić (2023)
- **Burkina Faso**
  - (Burkina Faso) Bertrand Traoré (2014–2015)
  - (Burkina Faso) Mamadou Zongo (1997–2004)
- **China**
  - (China) Zhang Yuning (2015–2017)
- **Curaçao**
  - (Curaçao) Eloy Room (2008–2017; 2023–2024)
- **Czech Republic**
  - (Czech Republic) Tomáš Kalas (2011–2013)
- **Denmark**
  - (Denmark) Mads Junker (2006–2010)
- **Ecuador**
  - (Ecuador) Giovanny Espinoza (2007–2008)
  - (Ecuador) Renato Ibarra (2011–2016)
- **El Salvador**
  - (El Salvador) Enrico Hernández (2020–2022)
- **Estonia**
  - (Estonia) Marko Meerits (2011–2014)
  - (Estonia) Raio Piiroja (2011–2012)
- **Finland**
  - (Finland) Niklas Tarvajärvi (2008–2009)
- **Georgia**
  - (Georgia (country)) Giorgi Chanturia (2011–2014)
  - (Georgia (country)) Guram Kashia (2010–2018)
  - (Georgia (country)) Valeri Qazaishvili (2011–2017)
- **Ghana**
  - (Ghana) Matthew Amoah (1998–2005)
  - (Ghana) Anthony Annan (2011–2012)
  - (Ghana) Christian Atsu (2013–2014)
  - (Ghana) Abubakari Yakubu (2004–2009)
- **Haiti**
  - (Haiti) Carlens Arcus (2022–2024)
- **Israel**
  - (Israel) Eli Dasa (2019–2022)
  - (Israel) Sheran Yeini (2015–2017)
- **Ivory Coast**
  - (Ivory Coast) Wilfried Bony (2011–2013)
- **Japan**
  - (Japan) Mike Havenaar (2012–2014)
  - (Japan) Michihiro Yasuda (2011–2013)
- **Kosovo**
  - (Kosovo) Toni Domgjoni (2021–2024)
  - (Kosovo) Milot Rashica (2015–2018)
- **Luxembourg**
  - (Luxembourg) Mica Pinto (2023–2024)
- **Mali**
  - (Mali) Mahamadou Diarra (1999–2002)
- **Mexico**
  - (Mexico) Joaquín del Olmo (1996–1997)
- **Morocco**
  - (Morocco) Zakaria Labyad (2014–2015)
- **Netherlands**
  - (Netherlands) Patrick van Aanholt (2012–2014)
  - (Netherlands) Sjaak Alberts (1942–1953)
  - (Netherlands) John van den Brom (1996–2001)
  - (Netherlands) Hans Gillhaus (1993–1995)
  - (Netherlands) Marco van Ginkel (2010–2013; 2023–2024)
  - (Netherlands) Just Göbel (1910–1923)
  - (Netherlands) Glenn Helder (1993–1995)
  - (Netherlands) Wim Hendriks (1946–1954)
  - (Netherlands) Willem Hesselink (1892–1899; 1901–1902; 1905–1919)
  - (Netherlands) Marc van Hintum (1997–2001)
  - (Netherlands) Pierre van Hooijdonk (1999–2000)
  - (Netherlands) Gerrit Horsten (1925–1935)
  - (Netherlands) Theo Janssen (1998–2008; 2012–2014)
  - (Netherlands) Martin Laamers (1986–1996)
  - (Netherlands) Bart Latuheru (1989–1996)
  - (Netherlands) Roy Makaay (1993–1997)
  - (Netherlands) Jan de Natris (1925–1928)
  - (Netherlands) Davy Pröpper (2008–2015; 2023–2024)
  - (Netherlands) Martijn Reuser (1997–1999)
  - (Netherlands) Victor Sikora (1999–2002)
  - (Netherlands) Edward Sturing (1987–1998)
- **Netherlands** (continued)
  - (Netherlands) Piet Velthuizen (2006–2010; 2011–2016)
  - (Netherlands) Ferdi Vierklau (1996–1997)
  - (Netherlands) Sander Westerveld (1996–1999)
- **Nigeria**
  - (Nigeria) Tijani Babangida (2001–2002)
  - (Nigeria) Benedict Iroha (1992–1996)
- **Norway**
  - (Norway) Martin Ødegaard (2018–2019)
  - (Norway) Marcus Pedersen (2010–2014)
  - (Norway) Sondre Tronstad (2020–2023)
- **Romania**
  - (Romania) Ștefan Nanu (1999–2003)
- **Russia**
  - (Russia) Vyacheslav Karavayev (2018–2019)
- **Saudi Arabia**
  - (Saudi Arabia) Mukhtar Ali (2017–2019)
- **Serbia**
  - (Serbia) Nenad Grozdić (1999–2000)
  - (Serbia) Dragoslav Jevrić (1999–2005)
  - (Serbia) Danko Lazović (2006–2007)
  - (Serbia) Slobodan Rajković (2010–2011)
  - (Serbia) Dejan Stefanović (1999–2003)
  - (Serbia) Vladimir Stojković (2007)
- **Slovakia**
  - (Slovakia) Matúš Bero (2018–2023)
  - (Slovakia) Marián Zeman (1997–2003)
- **Slovenia**
  - (Slovenia) Tim Matavž (2017–2020)
  - (Slovenia) Dalibor Stevanović (2009–2011)
- **South Africa**
  - (South Africa) Thulani Serero (2017–2019)
- **Ukraine**
  - (Ukraine) Denys Oliynyk (2014–2016)
- **United States**
  - (United States) Matt Miazga (2016–2018)
- **Zimbabwe**
  - (Zimbabwe) Marvelous Nakamba (2014–2017)

- Players in bold actively play for Vitesse and for their respective national teams. Years in brackets indicate careerspan with Vitesse.

=== National team players by Confederation ===
Member associations are listed in order of most to least amount of current and former Vitesse players represented Internationally

Total national team players by confederation
Confederation	Total	(Nation) Association
AFC	4	Japan (2), China (1), Saudi Arabia (1)
CAF	14	Ghana (4), Burkina Faso (2), Nigeria (2), Algeria (1), Ivory Coast (1), Mali (1), Morocco (1), South Africa (1), Zimbabwe (1)
CONCACAF	5	Curaçao (1), El Salvador (1), Haiti (1), Mexico (1), United States (1)
CONMEBOL	2	Ecuador (2)
OFC	0	
UEFA	57	Netherlands (24), Serbia (6), (Georgia (country)) Georgia (3), Norway (3), Belgium (2), Estonia (2), Israel (3), Kosovo (2), Slovakia (2), Slovenia (2), Albania (1), (Bosnia and Herzegovina) Bosnia & Herzegovina (1), Czech Republic (1), Denmark (1), Finland (1), Luxembourg (1), Romania (1), Russia (1), Ukraine (1)

== Players in international tournaments ==
The following is a list of Vitesse players who have competed in international tournaments, including the FIFA World Cup, FIFA Confederations Cup, UEFA European Championship, CONCACAF Gold Cup, Africa Cup of Nations, Copa América, and the Caribbean Cup. To this date no Vitesse players have participated in the AFC Asian Cup, or the OFC Nations Cup while playing for Vitesse.

Cup	Players
(Tunisia) 1994 Africa Cup of Nations	(Nigeria) Benedict Iroha
(United States) 1994 FIFA World Cup	(Nigeria) Benedict Iroha
(Bolivia) 1997 Copa América	(Ecuador) Giovanny Espinoza
(Ghana) (Nigeria) 2000 Africa Cup of Nations	(Burkina Faso) Mamadou Zongo
(Belgium) (Netherlands) UEFA Euro 2000	(Netherlands) Pierre van Hooijdonk
(Mali) 2002 Africa Cup of Nations	(Ghana) Matthew Amoah (Nigeria) Tijani Babangida (Mali) Mahamadou Diarra
(South Africa) 2010 FIFA World Cup	(Slovenia) Dalibor Stevanović
(Equatorial Guinea) (Gabon) 2012 Africa Cup of Nations	(Ghana) Anthony Annan (Ivory Coast) Wilfried Bony
(South Africa) 2013 Africa Cup of Nations	(Ivory Coast) Wilfried Bony
(Brazil) 2013 FIFA Confederations Cup	(Japan) Mike Havenaar
(Brazil) 2014 FIFA World Cup	(Ghana) Christian Atsu (Ecuador) Renato Ibarra
(Equatorial Guinea) 2015 Africa Cup of Nations	(Burkina Faso) Bertrand Traoré
(Chile) 2015 Copa América	(Ecuador) Renato Ibarra
(Gabon) 2017 Africa Cup of Nations	(Zimbabwe) Marvelous Nakamba
(Martinique) 2017 Caribbean Cup	(Curaçao) Eloy Room
(United States) 2017 CONCACAF Gold Cup	(Curaçao) Eloy Room
(Egypt) 2019 Africa Cup of Nations	(South Africa) Thulani Serero
(United States) (Canada) 2023 CONCACAF Gold Cup	(Haiti) Carlens Arcus

== List of Vitesse coaches ==
- No official coach (1887–1914)
- (England) Edgar Chadwick (1914)
- (England) John William Sutcliffe (1914–1915)
- (Scotland) James McPherson (1919–1920)
- (England) Charles Griffith (1920–1922)
- (Netherlands) Jan van Dort & Bram Evers (1922–1923)
- (Netherlands) Jan van Dort (1923–1924)
- (England) Bob Jefferson (1924–1927)
- (Germany) Heinrich Schwarz (1927–1936)
- (Netherlands) Joop Damsté (1936)
- (Netherlands) Gerrit van Wijhe (1936–1938)
- (Netherlands) Gerrit Horsten (1938–1946)
- (England) George Roper (1946–1947)
- (Netherlands) Arie van der Wel (1948–1949)
- (Netherlands) Gerrit Horsten (interim) (1949)
- (Netherlands) Jan Zonnenberg (1949–1954)
- (Austria) Joseph Gruber (1954–1957)
- (Netherlands) Louis Pastoors (1957–1960)
- (Socialist Federal Republic of Yugoslavia) Branko Vidović (1960–1962)
- (Netherlands) Jan Zonnenberg (1962–1964)
- (Austria) Joseph Gruber (1964–1966)
- (Netherlands) Frans de Munck (1966–1969)
- (Netherlands) Cor Brom (1969–1972)
- (Netherlands) Frans de Munck (1972–1974)
- (Socialist Federal Republic of Yugoslavia) Nedeljko Bulatović (1974–1975)
- (Netherlands) Jan de Bouter (1975–1976)
- (Netherlands) Clemens Westerhof (interim) (1976)
- (Netherlands) Henk Wullems (1976–1982)
- (Netherlands) Leen Looijen (1982–1984)
- (Netherlands) Henk Hofstee (interim) (1984)
- (Netherlands) Clemens Westerhof (1984–1985)
- (Poland) Janusz Kowalik (1985–1986)
- (Netherlands) Hans Dorjee (1986–1987)
- (Netherlands) Niels Overweg (1987)
- (Netherlands) Bert Jacobs (1987–1992)
- (Germany) Herbert Neumann (1992–1995)
- (Netherlands) Ronald Spelbos (1995)
- (Netherlands) Frans Thijssen & Jan Jongbloed (interim) (1995–1996)
- (Netherlands) Leo Beenhakker (1996–1997)
- (Netherlands) Henk ten Cate (1997–1998)
- (Portugal) Artur Jorge (1998)
- (Germany) Herbert Neumann (1998–1999)
- (Netherlands) Jan Jongbloed & Edward Sturing (interim) (1999–2000)
- (Netherlands) Ronald Koeman (2000–2001)
- (Netherlands) Edward Sturing (interim) (2001–2002)
- (Netherlands) Mike Snoei (2002–2003)
- (Netherlands) Edward Sturing (2003–2006)
- (Netherlands) Aad de Mos (2006–2008)
- (Netherlands) Hans Westerhof (2008)
- (Netherlands) Theo Bos (2009–2010)
- (Netherlands) Raimond van der Gouw & Hans van Arum (interim) (2010)
- (Spain) Albert Ferrer (2010–2011)
- (Netherlands) John van den Brom (2011–2012)
- (Netherlands) Fred Rutten (2012–2013)
- (Netherlands) Peter Bosz (2013–2016)
- (Netherlands) Rob Maas (2016)
- (Netherlands) Henk Fraser (2016–2018)
- (Netherlands) Edward Sturing (interim) (2018)
- (Russia) Leonid Slutsky (2018–2019)
- (Netherlands) Joseph Oosting (interim) (2019)
- (Netherlands) Edward Sturing (interim) (2020)
- (Germany) Thomas Letsch (2020–2022)
- (Netherlands) Phillip Cocu (2022–2023)
- (Netherlands) Edward Sturing (interim) (2023–2024)
- (Netherlands) John van den Brom (2024–2025)
- (Germany) Rüdiger Rehm (2025–present)

== Owners ==
After Karel Aalbers left, the financial situation for the club became dire. This downfall almost led Vitesse into bankruptcy in 2008, as they were not able to pay back loans given by their sponsor AFAB Geldservice B.V. Eventually the club arranged a deal that saw AFAB's owner, Maasbert Schouten, gain 100% of Vitesse's shares. Schouten immediately expressed his intent to sell the club, which opened the window for Merab Jordania to buy Vitesse. When Jordania, a former Dinamo Tbilisi player and owner, bought the team in 2010, Vitesse became the first Dutch club in history with a foreign owner. In 2013, Russian businessman Alexander Tsjigirinski bought the club from Jordania. In May 2018 a new acquisition took place at Vitesse. Valeriy Oyf, previously a board member of the club, became the new majority shareholder of Vitesse.

A consortium of five new owners (Dane Murphy, Flint Reilly, Timo Braasch, Leon Müller, and Bryan Mornaghi) acquired Vitesse, assuming its €17 million debt from creditor Coley Parry, who had stepped in after the club's previous Russian owner, Valery Oyf, sought a sale following the 2022 Russian invasion of Ukraine.

== Chairmen ==
The first chairman was Frans Dezentjé. Willem Hesselink was chairman of the club from 1917 to 1922 and was appointed honorary chairman in 1962. Although Vitesse's coaches have come from all over Europe, the club's chairmen have been mostly Dutch, with Merab Jordania and Yevgeny Merkel as the only exceptions. The name of Karel Aalbers is inseparably linked to Vitesse. Although a club's success is never the work of a single man, nonetheless, the former chairman's part in the sportive and professional growth of Vitesse may be labelled as truly exceptional. Karel Aalbers handled the chairman's gavel from 1984 to 2000.

- Frans Dezentjé, 1982
- Dick Couvéé, 1892–1993
- Siegfried Leopold, 1893
- Fons Donkers, 1893–1895
- Chris Engelberts, 1895–1909
- Johan Caderius van Veen, 1902–1906
- Lodewijk Suringa, 1906–1908
- Jan F. Keppel Hesselink, 1908–1909
- Wim Hupkes, 1909–1916
- Daniel Brondgeest, 1916
- Willem Hesselink, 1916–22
- Lex Staal, 1922–1924
- Jan Holtus, 1924–1929
- Wim Hupkes, 1929–1936
- Henk Herberts, 1936–1947
- Jan Bosloper, 1947–1949
- Herbert Mogendorff, 1949–1951
- Henk Hoolboom, 1951–1955
- Henk Lammers, 1955–1963
- Henk Herberts, 1963
- Coen Winters, 1963–1965
- Herbert Mogendorff, 1965
- Herman Ribbink, 1965–1967
- Gerard Veerkamp, 1967–1969
- Arnold van der Louw, 1969–1974
- Eef van Amerongen, 1974–1979
- Piet Bodewes, 1979–1982
- Bob Treffers, 1982–1984
- Karel Aalbers, 1984–2000
- Jan Konings, 2000
- Jos Vaessen, 2000–2003
- Kees Bakker, 2003–2004
- Henk Ramautar, 2004–2008
- Kees Bakker, 2008–2009
- Maasbert Schouten, 2009–2010
- Merab Jordania, 2010–2013
- Bert Roetert, 2013–2016
- Kees Bakker, 2016–2017
- Yevgeny Merkel, 2017–2021
- Henk Parren, 2021–

== Honours ==
=== Domestic ===
- Dutch Championship/Eredivisie

Runners-up: 1897–98, 1902–03, 1912–13, 1913–14, 1914–15

- Eerste Divisie

Winners: 1976–77, 1988–89
Runners-up: 1959–60, 1973–74
Promoted: 1970–71

- Tweede Divisie

Winners: 1965–66

- KNVB Cup

Winners: 2016–17
Runners-up: 1911–12, 1926–27, 1989–90, 2020–21

- Johan Cruyff Shield

Runners-up: 2017

=== Regional ===
- Eerste klasse Oost

Winners: 1896–97, 1897–98, 1902–03, 1912–13, 1913–14, 1914–15, 1952–53
Promoted: 1954–55

- Tweede klasse Oost

Winners: 1922–23, 1940–41, 1943–44, 1945–46, 1949–50

- Gelderland Competition

Winners: 1894–95, 1895–96

=== Club Awards ===
- VVCS: Dutch Team of the Year

Winners: 1989–90

== Personnel honours ==
=== European Golden Boot ===
The following players have won the European Golden Boot whilst playing for Vitesse:

- (Greece) Nikos Machlas (34 goals) – 1998

=== Dutch Footballer of the Year (Golden Boots) ===
The following players have won the Dutch Footballer of the Year whilst playing for Vitesse:

- (Netherlands) Edward Sturing – 1990 (Eredivisie)
- (Ivory Coast) Wilfried Bony – 2013 (Eredivisie)

=== Johan Cruyff Trophy ===
The following players have won the Johan Cruyff Trophy whilst playing for Vitesse:

- (Netherlands) Marco van Ginkel – 2013

=== Eredivisie Top Scorer ===
- (Greece) Nikos Machlas (34 goals) – 1998
- (Ivory Coast) Wilfried Bony (31 goals) – 2013

=== Eerste Divisie Top Scorer ===
- (Netherlands) Herman Veenendaal (23 goals) – 1974
- (Netherlands) Remco Boere (27 goals) – 1983

=== Rinus Michels Award (Manager of the year) ===
- (Netherlands) Fred Rutten (Runner-up) – 2012/13
- (Netherlands) Peter Bosz (Runner-up) – 2013/14, 2014/15
- (Netherlands) Henk Fraser (Runner-up) – 2016/17
- (Germany) Thomas Letsch (Runner-up) – 2020/21

=== UEFA's #EqualGame Award ===
- (Georgia (country)) Guram Kashia – 2018

=== Georgian Footballer of the Year ===
- (Georgia (country)) Guram Kashia – 2012, 2013

== Vitesse in Europe ==
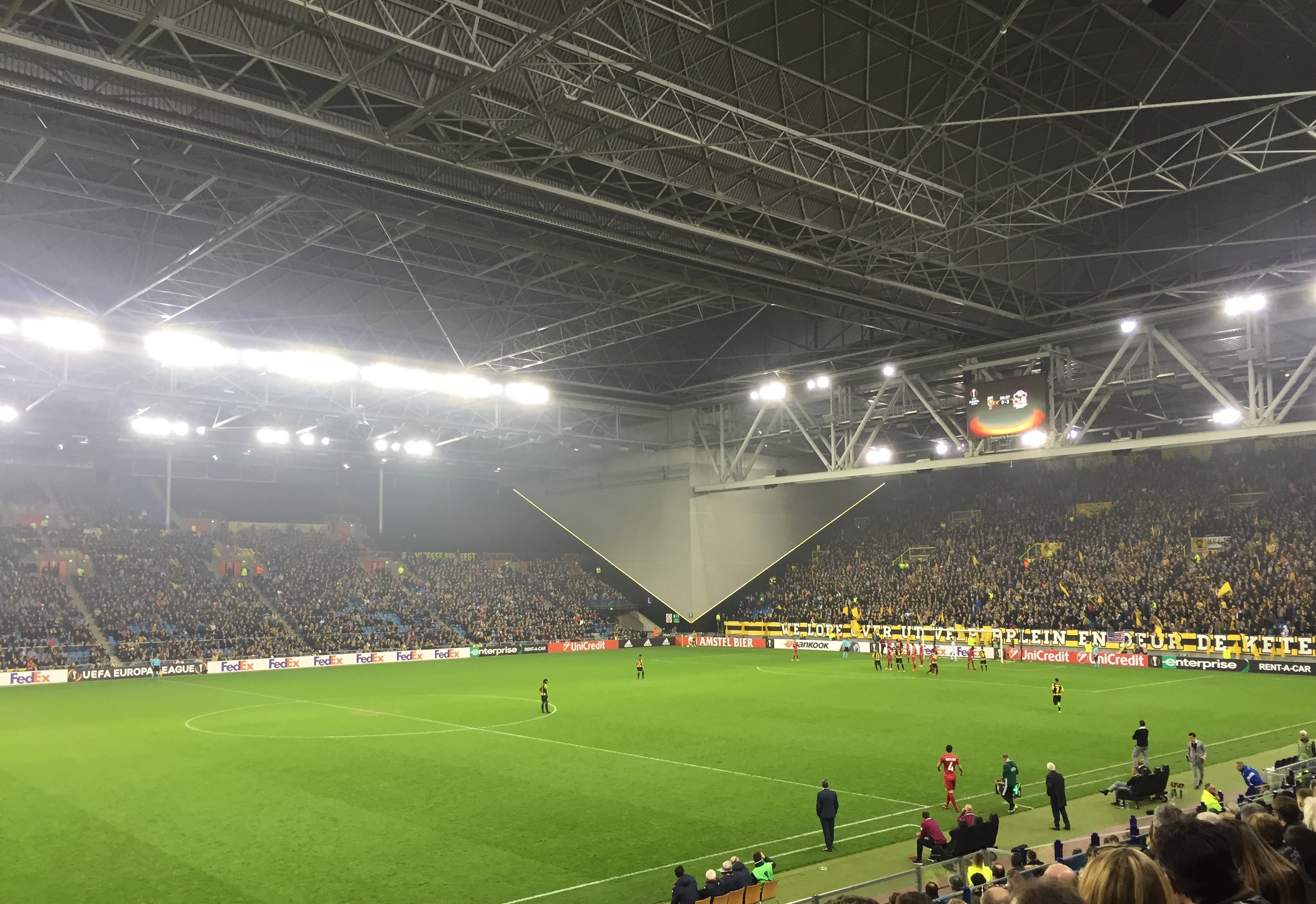
Vitesse in the Europa League.

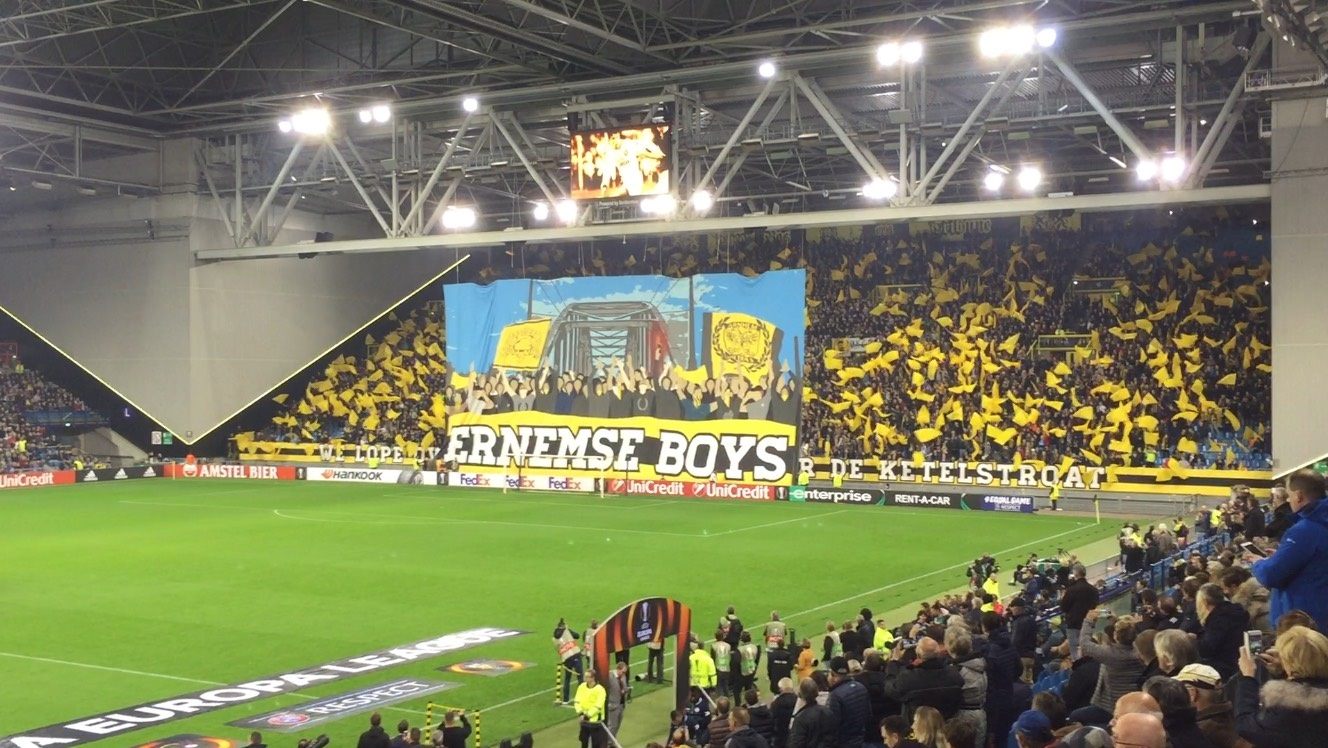
Theo Bos – South Stand.

- Group = group game
- Q = qualifying round
- KPO = knockout round play-offs
- PO = play-off round
- 1R = first round
- 2R = second round
- 3R = third round
- 1/8 = 1/8 final

Season	Competition	Round	Country	Club	Score	Goalscorers Vitesse
1978–79	Intertoto Cup	Group	(Italy)	Hellas Verona	2–1, 0–2	Bursac, Hofs / (-)
1978–79	Intertoto Cup	Group	(Belgium)	RWDM	0–5, 0–2	(-) / (-)
1978–79	Intertoto Cup	Group	(France)	Troyes	5–3, 2–1	Bleijenberg (2), Heezen, Mulderij, Bosveld / Bleijenberg, Beukhof
1990–91	UEFA Cup	1R	(Republic of Ireland)	Derry City	1–0, 0–0	Loeffen / (-)
1990–91	UEFA Cup	2R	(Scotland)	Dundee United	1–0, 4–0	Eijer / Latuheru (2), Van den Brom, Eijer
1990–91	UEFA Cup	1/16	(Portugal)	Sporting CP	0–2, 1–2	(-) / Van Arum
1992–93	UEFA Cup	1R	(Republic of Ireland)	Derry City	3–0, 2–1	Van den Brom (2), Van Arum / Straal, Laamers
1992–93	UEFA Cup	2R	(Belgium)	Mechelen	1–0, 1–0	Van den Brom / Cocu
1992–93	UEFA Cup	1/16	(Spain)	Real Madrid	0–1, 0–1	(-) / (-)
1993–94	UEFA Cup	1R	(England)	Norwich City	0–3, 0–0	(-) / (-)
1994–95	UEFA Cup	1R	(Italy)	Parma	1–0, 0–2	Gillhaus / (-)
1997–98	UEFA Cup	1R	(Portugal)	Braga	2–1, 0–2	Čurović, Trustfull / (-)
1998–99	UEFA Cup	1R	(Greece)	AEK Athens	3–0, 3–3	Laros, Perović, Machlas / Machlas (2), Reuser
1998–99	UEFA Cup	2R	(France)	Bordeaux	0–1, 1–2	(-) / Jochemsen
1999–00	UEFA Cup	1R	(Portugal)	Beira-Mar	2–1, 0–0	Van Hooijdonk, Grozdić / (-)
1999–00	UEFA Cup	2R	(France)	Lens	1–4, 1–1	Van Hooijdonk / Kreek
2000–01	UEFA Cup	1R	(Israel)	Maccabi Haifa	3–0, 1–2	Martel, Peeters, Amoah / Amoah
2000–01	UEFA Cup	2R	(Italy)	Internazionale	0–0, 1–1	(-) / Peeters
2002–03	UEFA Cup	1R	(Romania)	Rapid București	1–1, 1–0	Peeters / Peeters
2002–03	UEFA Cup	2R	(Germany)	Werder Bremen	2–1, 3–3	Amoah, Verlaat (o.g.) / Levchenko, Claessens, Mbamba
2002–03	UEFA Cup	3R	(England)	Liverpool	0–1, 0–1	(-) / (-)
2012–13	Europa League	Q2	(Bulgaria)	Lokomotiv Plovdiv	4–4, 3–1	Van Ginkel (2), Reis, Bony / Van Ginkel, Van Aanholt, Bony
2012–13	Europa League	Q3	(Russia)	Anzhi Makhachkala	0–2, 0–2	(-) / (-)
2013–14	Europa League	Q3	(Romania)	Petrolul Ploiești	1–1, 1–2	Reis / Van der Heijden
2015–16	Europa League	Q3	(England)	Southampton	0–3, 0–2	(-) / (-)
2017–18	Europa League	Group	(France)	Nice	0–3, 1–0	(-) / Castaignos
2017–18	Europa League	Group	(Italy)	Lazio	2–3, 1–1	Matavž, Linssen / Linssen
2017–18	Europa League	Group	(Belgium)	Zulte Waregem	0–2, 1–1	(-) / Bruns
2018–19	Europa League	Q2	(Romania)	Viitorul Constanța	3–1, 2–2	Matavž, Linssen, Beerens / Matavž, Linssen
2018–19	Europa League	Q3	(Switzerland)	Basel	0–1, 0–1	(-) / (-)
2021–22	Europa Conference League	Q3	(Republic of Ireland)	Dundalk	2–2, 2–1	Bero, Openda / Bero, Gboho
2021–22	Europa Conference League	PO	(Belgium)	Anderlecht	3–3, 2–1	Dasa, Frederiksen, Tannane / Wittek (2)
2021–22	Europa Conference League	Group	(England)	Tottenham Hotspur	1–0, 2–3	Wittek / Rasmussen, Beró
2021–22	Europa Conference League	Group	(France)	Rennes	1–2, 3–3	Wittek / Huisman, Buitink, Openda
2021–22	Europa Conference League	Group	(Slovenia)	Mura	3–1, 2–0	Buitink, Openda, Huisman / Tronstad, Doekhi
2021–22	Europa Conference League	KPO	(Austria)	Rapid Wien	2–0, 1–2	Grbic, Beró / Openda
2021–22	Europa Conference League	1/16	(Italy)	Roma	0–1, 1–1	(-) / Wittek

== UEFA ranking ==
As of 7 June 2025

Rank	Country	Team	Points	NA
124	(Netherlands)	Vitesse	9.000	13.430

== Dutch Cup finals ==
Season	Opponent	Result	Place	Date
1911–12	Haarlem	0–2	R.A.P.-terrein, Amsterdam	26 May 1912
1926–27	V.U.C.	1–3	Monnikenhuize, Arnhem	19 June 1927
1989–90	PSV Eindhoven	0–1	De Kuip, Rotterdam	25 April 1990
2016–17	AZ	2–0	De Kuip, Rotterdam	30 April 2017
2020–21	Ajax	1–2	De Kuip, Rotterdam	18 April 2021

The winners of the cup compete against the winners of the Eredivisie for the Johan Cruyff Shield.

=== Johan Cruyff Shield ===
Season	Opponent	Result	Place	Date
2017	Feyenoord	1–1 (2–4 pen.)	De Kuip, Rotterdam	5 August 2017

== Club records ==
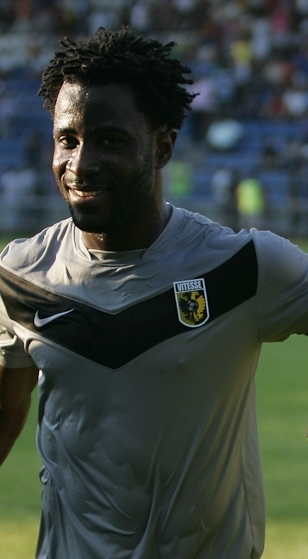
Highest transfer fee received: Wilfried Bony to Swansea City for £12 million. (2013)

- Highest transfer fee paid: Bob Peeters from Roda JC for €6.4 million, 2000
- Record League win: 0–17 v Victoria, Gelderse Competitie NVB, 11 November 1894
- Record Eredivisie win: 7–0 v Sparta Rotterdam, 14 April 2018
- Record Eerste Divisie win: 7–0 v FC Wageningen, 30 August 1970
- Record European win: 0–4 v Dundee United, UEFA Cup Second Round, 7 November 1990
- Record home win: 14–0 v Victoria, Gelderse Competitie NVB, 20 January 1895
- Record away win: 0–17 v Victoria, Gelderse Competitie NVB, 11 November 1894
- Record home Eredivisie win: 7–0 v Sparta Rotterdam, 14 April 2018
- Record away Eredivisie win: 1–7 v Fortuna Sittard, 27 September 1997
- Record defeat: 12–1 v Ajax, Eredivisie, 19 May 1972
- Record tournament defeat: 0–7 v PSV, KNVB Beker, Fourth Round, 4 May 1969
- Highest ranking: 3rd in Eredivisie, 1997–98
- Longest unbeaten run (League): 22, from 8 January 1967 until 17 September 1967 in Eerste Divisie
- Most clean sheets in one season: 18, Eerste Divisie, 1988–89
- Most League goals all-time by player : 155 – Jan Dommering
- Most League goals in a season by player: 34 – Nikos Machlas, Eredivisie, 1997–98
- Most goals scored in a match: 9 – Nico Westdijk v De Treffers, Tweede Klasse C Oost, 19 October 1941
- Most League goals scored in a season: 85, Eredivisie, 1997–98
- Most League goals conceded in a season: 74, Eredivisie, 1971–72
- Most hat-tricks scored (League): 12 – Jan Dommering
- Fewest League goals scored in a season: 22, Eredivisie, 1971–72
- Fewest League goals conceded in a season: 20, Eerste Divisie, 1988–89
- Fastest own goal: 19 seconds – Purrel Fränkel v Twente, Eredivisie, 3 October 2003
- Most top scorer of Vitesse: John van den Brom, 5 times
- Most international caps for the Netherlands national football team as a Vitesse player: Just Göbel, 22

== Domestic results ==
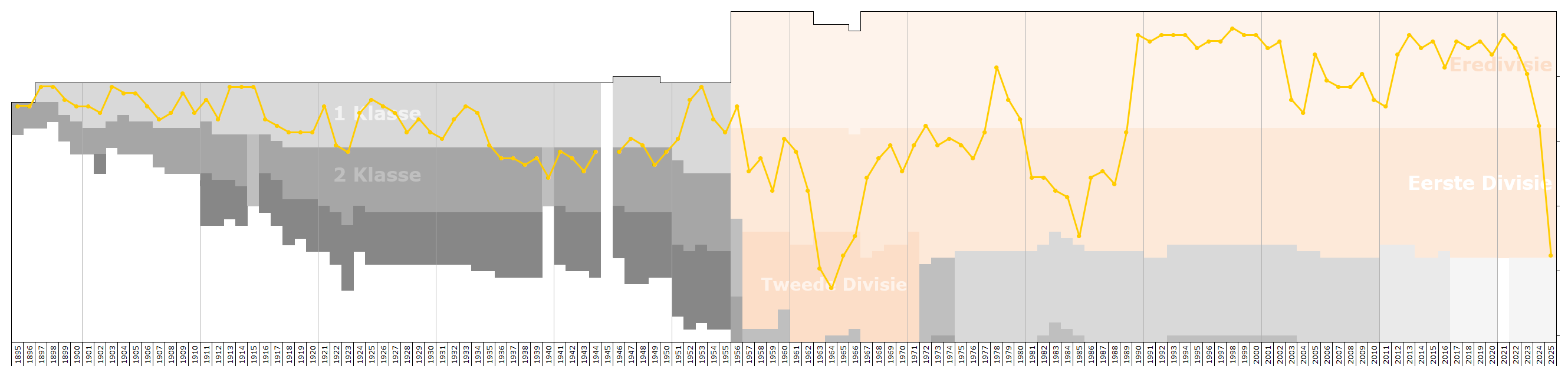
Historical chart of league performance

Below is a table with Vitesse's domestic results since the introduction of the Eredivisie in 1956.

Domestic Results since 1956
Domestic league	League result	Qualification to	KNVB Cup season	Cup result
2024–25 Eerste Divisie	20th	–	2024–25	first round
2023–24 Eredivisie	18th	Eerste Divisie (relegation)	2023–24	quarter-final
2022–23 Eredivisie	10th	–	2022–23	first round
2021–22 Eredivisie	6th	– (losing UECL play-offs)	2021–22	quarter-final
2020–21 Eredivisie	4th	Europa Conference League (Q3)	2020–21	final
2019–20 Eredivisie	7th	–	2019–20	quarter-final
2018–19 Eredivisie	5th	–	2018–19	quarter-final
2017–18 Eredivisie	6th (5th after EC play-offs)	Europa League (Q2) (winning EC play-offs)	2017–18	first round
2016–17 Eredivisie	5th	Europa League	2016–17	winners
2015–16 Eredivisie	9th	–	2015–16	second round
2014–15 Eredivisie	5th (4th after EC play-offs)	Europa League (Q3) (winning EC play-offs)	2014–15	quarter-final
2013–14 Eredivisie	6th (8th after EC play-offs)	– (losing EC play-offs)	2013–14	round of 16
2012–13 Eredivisie	4th	Europa League	2012–13	quarter-final
2011–12 Eredivisie	7th (6th after EC play-offs)	Europa League (winning EC play-offs)	2011–12	quarter-final
2010–11 Eredivisie	15th	–	2010–11	round of 16
2009–10 Eredivisie	14th	–	2009–10	third round
2008–09 Eredivisie	10th	–	2008–09	third round
2007–08 Eredivisie	12th	–	2007–08	second round
2006–07 Eredivisie	12th (10th after IC play-offs)	– (losing IC play-offs)	2006–07	third round
2005–06 Eredivisie	11th (10th after IC play-offs)	– (losing IC play-offs)	2005–06	second round
2004–05 Eredivisie	7th	–	2004–05	third round
2003–04 Eredivisie	16th	– (surviving promotion/relegation play-offs)	2003–04	round of 16
2002–03 Eredivisie	14th	–	2002–03	quarter-final
2001–02 Eredivisie	5th	UEFA Cup	2001–02	second round
2000–01 Eredivisie	6th	–	2000–01	semi-final
1999–2000 Eredivisie	4th	UEFA Cup	1999–2000	semi-final
1998–99 Eredivisie	4th	UEFA Cup	1998–99	quarter-final
1997–98 Eredivisie	3rd	UEFA Cup	1997–98	quarter-final
1996–97 Eredivisie	5th	UEFA Cup	1996–97	quarter-final
1995–96 Eredivisie	5th	–	1995–96	second round
1994–95 Eredivisie	6th	–	1994–95	second round
1993–94 Eredivisie	4th	UEFA Cup	1993–94	third round
1992–93 Eredivisie	4th	UEFA Cup	1992–93	round of 16
1991–92 Eredivisie	4th	UEFA Cup	1991–92	round of 16
1990–91 Eredivisie	5th	–	1990–91	quarter-final
1989–90 Eredivisie	4th	UEFA Cup	1989–90	final
1988–89 Eerste Divisie	1st	Eredivisie (promotion)	1988–89	quarter-final
1987–88 Eerste Divisie	9th	promotion/relegation play-offs: no promotion	1987–88	first round
1986–87 Eerste Divisie	7th	–	1986–87	quarter-final
1985–86 Eerste Divisie	8th	promotion/relegation play-offs: no promotion	1985–86	first round
1984–85 Eerste Divisie	17th	–	1984–85	second round
1983–84 Eerste Divisie	11th	–	1983–84	first round
1982–83 Eerste Divisie	10th	–	1982–83	second round
1981–82 Eerste Divisie	8th	–	1981–82	second round
1980–81 Eerste Divisie	8th	–	1980–81	first round
1979–80 Eredivisie	17th	Eerste Divisie (relegation)	1979–80	round of 16
1978–79 Eredivisie	14th	–	1978–79	second round
1977–78 Eredivisie	9th	–	1977–78	quarter-final
1976–77 Eerste Divisie	1st	Eredivisie (promotion)	1976–77	second round
1975–76 Eerste Divisie	5th	promotion/relegation play-offs: no promotion	1975–76	first round
1974–75 Eerste Divisie	3rd	promotion/relegation play-offs: no promotion	1974–75	first round
1973–74 Eerste Divisie	2nd	promotion/relegation play-offs: no promotion	1973–74	second round
1972–73 Eerste Divisie	3rd	–	1972–73	second round
1971–72 Eredivisie	18th	Eerste Divisie (relegation)	1971–72	first round
1970–71 Eerste Divisie	3rd	Eredivisie (promotion)	1970–71	second round
1969–70 Eerste Divisie	7th	–	1969–70	second round
1968–69 Eerste Divisie	3rd	–	1968–69	quarter-final
1967–68 Eerste Divisie	5th	–	1967–68	group stage
1966–67 Eerste Divisie	8th	–	1966–67	first round
1965–66 Tweede Divisie	1st (group A)	Eerste Divisie (promotion)	1965–66	group stage
1964–65 Tweede Divisie	4th (group A)	–	1964–65	first round
1963–64 Tweede Divisie	9th (group B)	–	1963–64	first round
1962–63 Tweede Divisie	6th (group A)	–	1962–63	second round
1961–62 Eerste Divisie	10th (group A)	Tweede Divisie (relegation)	1961–62	fourth round
1960–61 Eerste Divisie	4th (group A)	–	1960–61	group stage
1959–60 Eerste Divisie	2nd (group A)	promotion/relegation play-offs: no promotion	not held	
1958–59 Eerste Divisie	10th (group B)	–	1958–59	no participation
1957–58 Eerste Divisie	5th (group A)	–	1957–58	fourth round
1956–57 Eerste Divisie	7th (group B)	–	1956–57	second round

== Statistics ==
(As of 10 December 2021)	Eredivisie	Eerste Divisie	Tweede Divisie	UEFA CUP	UEFA Europa League	Europa Conference League
Matches played	1228	852	120	36	18	14
Matches won	482	379	57	14	3	6
Matches drawn	342	215	34	9	5	4
Matches lost	404	258	29	13	10	4
Goals for	1868	1450	221	40	19	25
Goal against	1697	1192	165	37	32	20
Seasons	37	25	4	9	5	1
Best ranking	3 (1997–98)	1 (1976–77, 1988–89)	1 (1965–66)	–	–	–
Worst ranking	18 (1971–72)	17 (1984–85)	9 (1963–64)	–	–	–

=== Club topscorers by season ===
- 1954/55 (Netherlands) Eltjo Veentjer (10)
- 1955/56 (Netherlands) Eltjo Veentjer (10)
- 1956/57 (Netherlands) Jan Schatorjé (16)
- 1957/58 (Netherlands) Gerrit van der Pol (13)
- 1958/59 (Netherlands) Loek Feijen (15)
- 1959/60 (Netherlands) Loek Feijen (17)
- 1960/61 (Netherlands) Loek Feijen (12)
- 1961/62 (Netherlands) Jan Seelen (13)
- 1962/63 (Netherlands) Jan Seelen (18)
- 1963/64 (Netherlands) Jan Seelen (10)
- 1964/65 (Netherlands) Jan Veenstra (12)
- 1965/66 (Netherlands) Hans Verhagen (21)
- 1966/67 (Netherlands) Jan Veenstra (22)
- 1967/68 (Netherlands) Hans Verhagen (17)
- 1968/69 (Netherlands) Henk Bosveld (15)
- 1969/70 (Netherlands) Wim Kleinjan (11)
- 1970/71 (Netherlands) Bart Stovers (10)
- 1971/72 (Netherlands) Ben Gerritsen (5)
- 1971/72 (Netherlands) Herman Veenendaal (5)
- 1972/73 (Netherlands) Bram van Kerkhof (20)
- 1973/74 (Netherlands) Herman Veenendaal (23)
- 1974/75 (Netherlands) Henk Bosveld (16)
- 1975/76 (Netherlands) Henk Bosveld (10)
- 1975/76 (Socialist Federal Republic of Yugoslavia) Boško Bursać (10)
- 1976/77 (Socialist Federal Republic of Yugoslavia) Boško Bursać (20)
- 1977/78 (Socialist Federal Republic of Yugoslavia) Boško Bursać (13)
- 1978/79 (Netherlands) Henk Bosveld (7)
- 1978/79 (Netherlands) Herman Gerdsen (7)
- 1979/80 (Netherlands) Hans Bleijenberg (11)
- 1980/81 (Netherlands) Ron van Oosterom (14)
- 1981/82 (Netherlands) Jurrie Koolhof (19)
- 1982/83 (Netherlands) Chris van de Akker (10)
- 1983/84 (Netherlands) Remco Boere (27)
- 1984/85 (Netherlands) Henk Thijssen (8)
- 1985/86 (Netherlands) Roger Schouwenaar (11)
- 1985/86 (Netherlands) Rick Talan (11)
- 1986/87 (Netherlands) John van den Brom (17)
- 1987/88 (Netherlands) Rick Talan (16)
- 1988/89 (Netherlands) Jurrie Koolhof (13)
- 1989/90 (Netherlands) John van den Brom (14)
- 1990/91 (Netherlands) John van den Brom (8)
- 1991/92 (Netherlands) John van den Brom (10)
- 1992/93 (Netherlands) John van den Brom (15)
- 1993/94 (Netherlands) Hans Gillhaus (22)
- 1994/95 (Netherlands) Roy Makaay (11)
- 1995/96 (Netherlands) Roy Makaay (11)
- 1996/97 (Netherlands) Roy Makaay (19)
- 1997/98 (Greece) Nikos Machlas (34)
- 1998/99 (Greece) Nikos Machlas (18)
- 1999/00 (Netherlands) Pierre van Hooijdonk (25)
- 2000/01 (Ghana) Matthew Amoah (11)
- 2001/02 (Ghana) Matthew Amoah (6)
- 2002/03 (Ghana) Matthew Amoah (15)
- 2003/04 (Cameroon) Emile Mbamba (6)
- 2004/05 (Ghana) Matthew Amoah (13)
- 2005/06 (Netherlands) Youssouf Hersi (10)
- 2006/07 (Serbia) Danko Lazović (19)
- 2007/08 (Netherlands) Santi Kolk (12)
- 2008/09 (Netherlands) Ricky van Wolfswinkel (8)
- 2009/10 (Netherlands) Santi Kolk (7)
- 2009/10 (Sweden) Lasse Nilsson (7)
- 2010/11 (Netherlands) Marco van Ginkel (5)
- 2010/11 (Norway) Marcus Pedersen (5)
- 2011/12 (Ivory Coast) Wilfried Bony (12)
- 2012/13 (Ivory Coast) Wilfried Bony (31)
- 2013/14 (Brazil) Lucas Piazon (11)
- 2014/15 (Burkina Faso) Bertrand Traoré (14)
- 2015/16 (Georgia (country)) Valeri Qazaishvili (10)
- 2016/17 (Netherlands) Ricky van Wolfswinkel (20)
- 2017/18 (Netherlands) Bryan Linssen (15)
- 2018/19 (Netherlands) Bryan Linssen (12)
- 2019/20 (Netherlands) Bryan Linssen (14)
- 2020/21 (Albania) Armando Broja (10)
- 2021/22 (Belgium) Loïs Openda (18)
- 2022/23 (Netherlands) Million Manhoef (9)
- 2023/24 (Netherlands) Marco van Ginkel (7)

=== Player of the Season ===
Vitesse's Player of the Season award is voted for by the club's supporters. It was first introduced in the 1989–90 season.

Year	Winner
1990	(Netherlands) Theo Bos
1991	(Netherlands) René Eijer
1992	(Netherlands) Martin Laamers
1993	(Netherlands) Phillip Cocu
1994	(Netherlands) Glenn Helder
1995	(Netherlands) Chris van der Weerden
1996	(Netherlands) Arco Jochemsen
1997	(Netherlands) Edward Sturing
1998	(Greece) Nikos Machlas
1999	(Netherlands) Sander Westerveld

Year	Winner
2000	(Netherlands) Michel Kreek
2001	(Netherlands) Victor Sikora
2002	(Serbia) Dejan Stefanović
2003	(Ghana) Matthew Amoah
2004	(Netherlands) Nicky Hofs
2005	(Ghana) Abubakari Yakubu
2006	(Netherlands) Youssouf Hersi
2007	(Serbia) Danko Lazović
2008	(Netherlands) Piet Velthuizen
2009	(Netherlands) Paul Verhaegh

Year	Winner
2010	(Netherlands) Piet Velthuizen
2011	(Serbia) Slobodan Rajković
2012	(Netherlands) Alexander Büttner
2013	(Ivory Coast) Wilfried Bony
2014	(Ghana) Christian Atsu
2015	(Netherlands) Davy Pröpper
2016	(Georgia (country)) Guram Kashia
2017	(Netherlands) Ricky van Wolfswinkel
2018	(England) Mason Mount
2019	(Norway) Martin Ødegaard

Year	Winner
2020	(Netherlands) Remko Pasveer
2021	(Netherlands) Remko Pasveer
2022	(Germany) Maximilian Wittek

=== Most appearances ===
==== All competitions ====
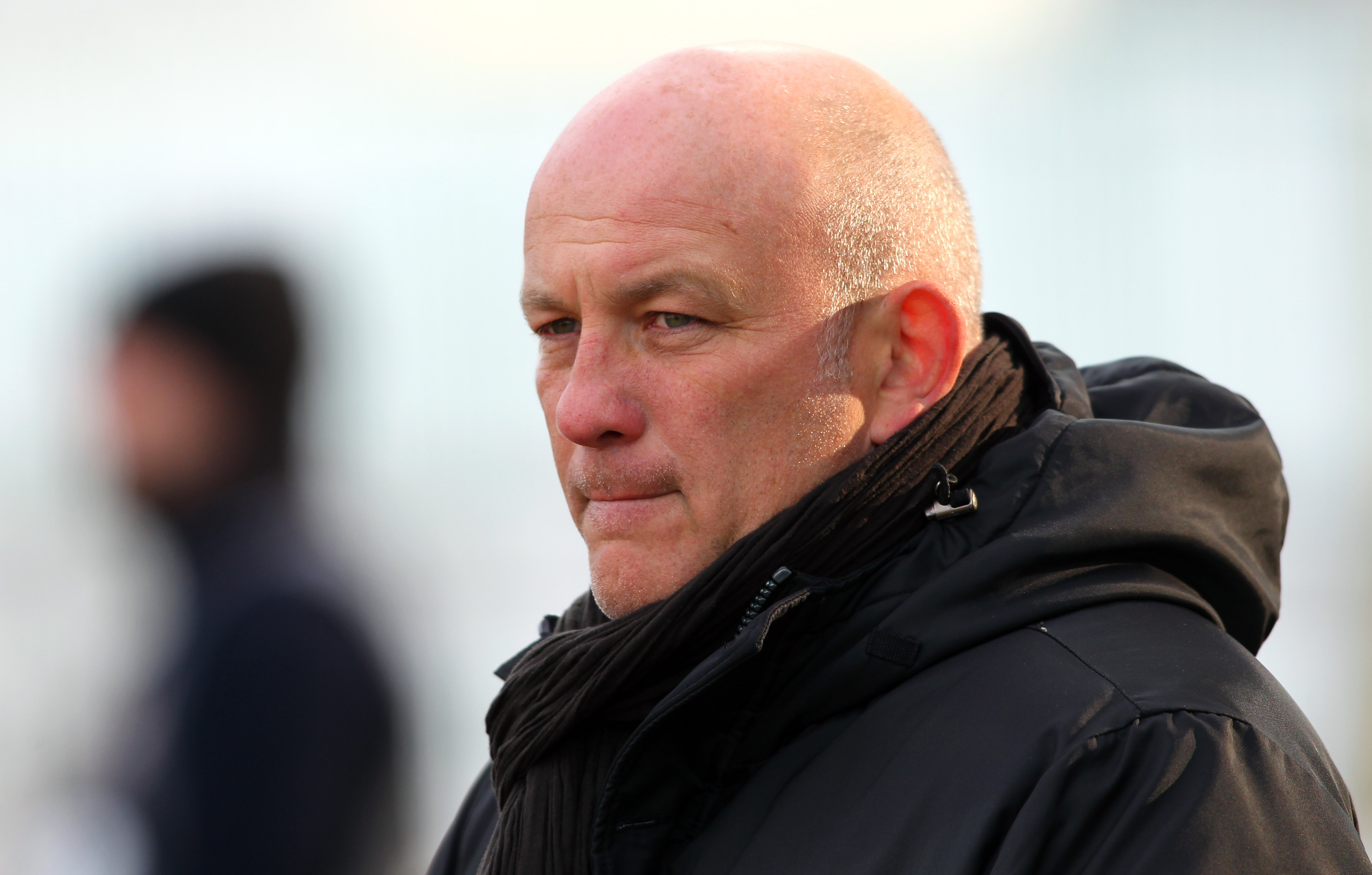
Bos spent his entire career for Vitesse, making a total of 429 appearances in 14 seasons with his club. He is therefore considered to be Mister Vitesse.

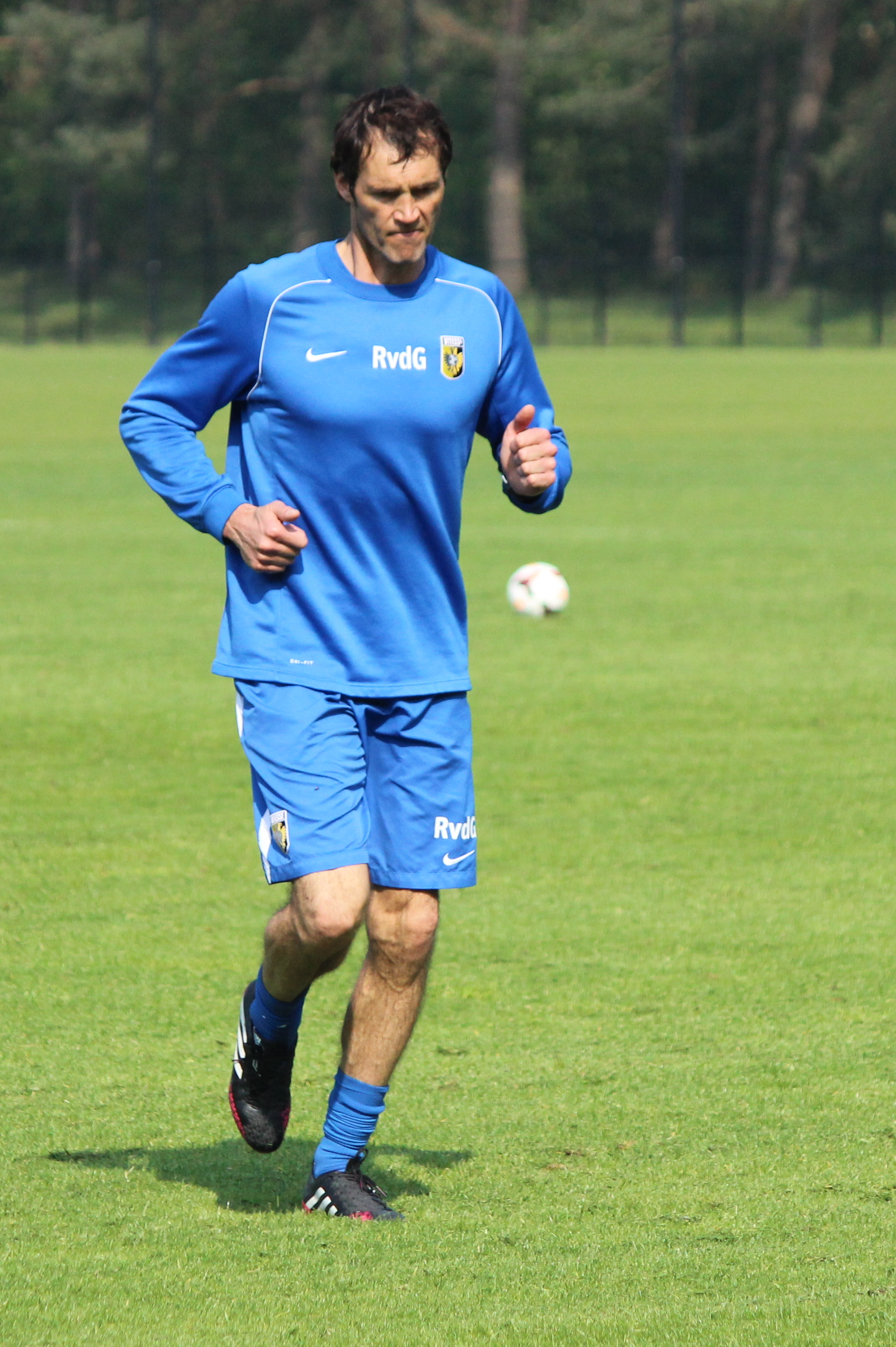
Van der Gouw is a former Dutch goalkeeper who played most of his career for Vitesse. He amassed a total of 294 matches. In 2009, he was appointed as goalkeeping coach of Vitesse.

Ranking	Name	Position	matches	First season	Last season
1.	(Netherlands) Theo Bos	DF	429	1983/1984	1997/1998
2.	(Netherlands) Edward Sturing	DF	383	1987/1988	1997/1998
3.	(Netherlands) John van den Brom	MF	378	1986/1987	2000/2001
4.	(Netherlands) Martin Laamers	MF	354	1986/1987	1995/1996
5.	(Netherlands) Raimond van der Gouw	GK	294	1988/1989	1995/1996
6.	(Georgia (country)) Guram Kashia	DF	292	2010/2011	2017/2018

==== Eredivisie ====
Ranking	Name	Position	matches	First season	Last season
1.	(Georgia (country)) Guram Kashia	DF	244	2010/2011	2017/2018
2.	(Netherlands) Davy Pröpper	MF	133	2009/2010	2014/2015
3.	(Curaçao) Eloy Room	GK	128	2008/2009	2016/2017
4.	(Netherlands) Piet Velthuizen	GK	125	2006/2007	2015/2016
5.	(Netherlands) Jan-Arie van der Heijden	DF	123	2011/2012	2014/2015
6.	(Ecuador) Renato Ibarra	FW	122	2011/2012	2015/2016

==== Europa ====
Ranking	Name	Position	matches	First season	Last season
1.	(Netherlands) Theo Bos	DF	17	1983/1984	1997/1998
2.	(Netherlands) John van den Brom	MF	17	1986/1987	2000/2001
3.	(Netherlands) Raimond van der Gouw	GK	16	1988/1989	1995/1996
4.	(Netherlands) Theo Janssen	MF	16	1998/1999	2013/2014
5.	(Netherlands) Martin Laamers	MF	16	1986/1987	1995/1996
6.	(Netherlands) Bart Latuheru	FW	15	1989/1990	1995/1996

=== Top goalscorers ===
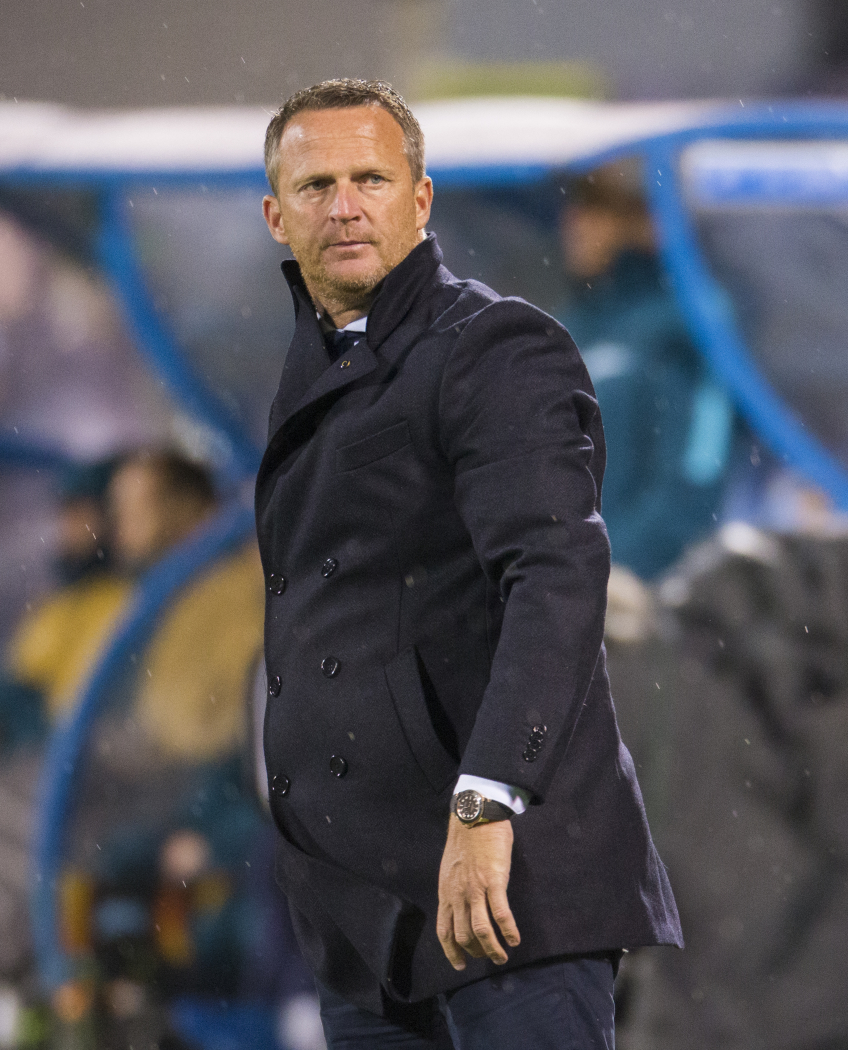
John van den Brom played at Vitesse from 1986 to 1993, and from 1996 to 2001. He came back to manage the club from 2011 to 2012.

==== All competitions ====
Ranking	Name	Position	Goals	Period
1.	(Netherlands) Jan Dommering	FW	168	1929–1948
2.	(Netherlands) John van den Brom	MF	110	1986–2001
3.	(Netherlands) Gerrit Langeler	FW	91	1916–1925
4.	(Netherlands) Kees Meeuwsen	FW	89	1929–1954
5.	(Netherlands) Henk Bosveld	MF	82	1968–1979
6.	(Bosnia and Herzegovina) Boško Bursać	FW	78	1974–1980

==== Eredivisie ====
Ranking	Name	Position	Goals	Period
1.	(Ghana) Matthew Amoah	FW	61	1998–2006
2.	(Netherlands) John van den Brom (Greece) Nikos Machlas	MF	60	1986–2001; 1996–1999
3.	(Ivory Coast) Wilfried Bony	FW	46	2011–2013
4.	(Netherlands) Roy Makaay	FW	42	1993–1997
5.	(Netherlands) Bryan Linssen	FW	41	2017–2020
6.	(Serbia) Dejan Čurović	FW	41	1994–2000

==== Europa ====
Ranking	Name	Position	Goals	Period
1.	(Germany) Maximilian Wittek	DF	5	2020–2023
2.	(Netherlands) John van den Brom	MF	4	1986–2001
3.	(Netherlands) Bryan Linssen	FW	4	2017–2020
4.	(Belgium) Bob Peeters	FW	4	2000–2003
5.	(Ghana) Matthew Amoah	FW	3	2000–2005

=== Vitesse All Stars ===
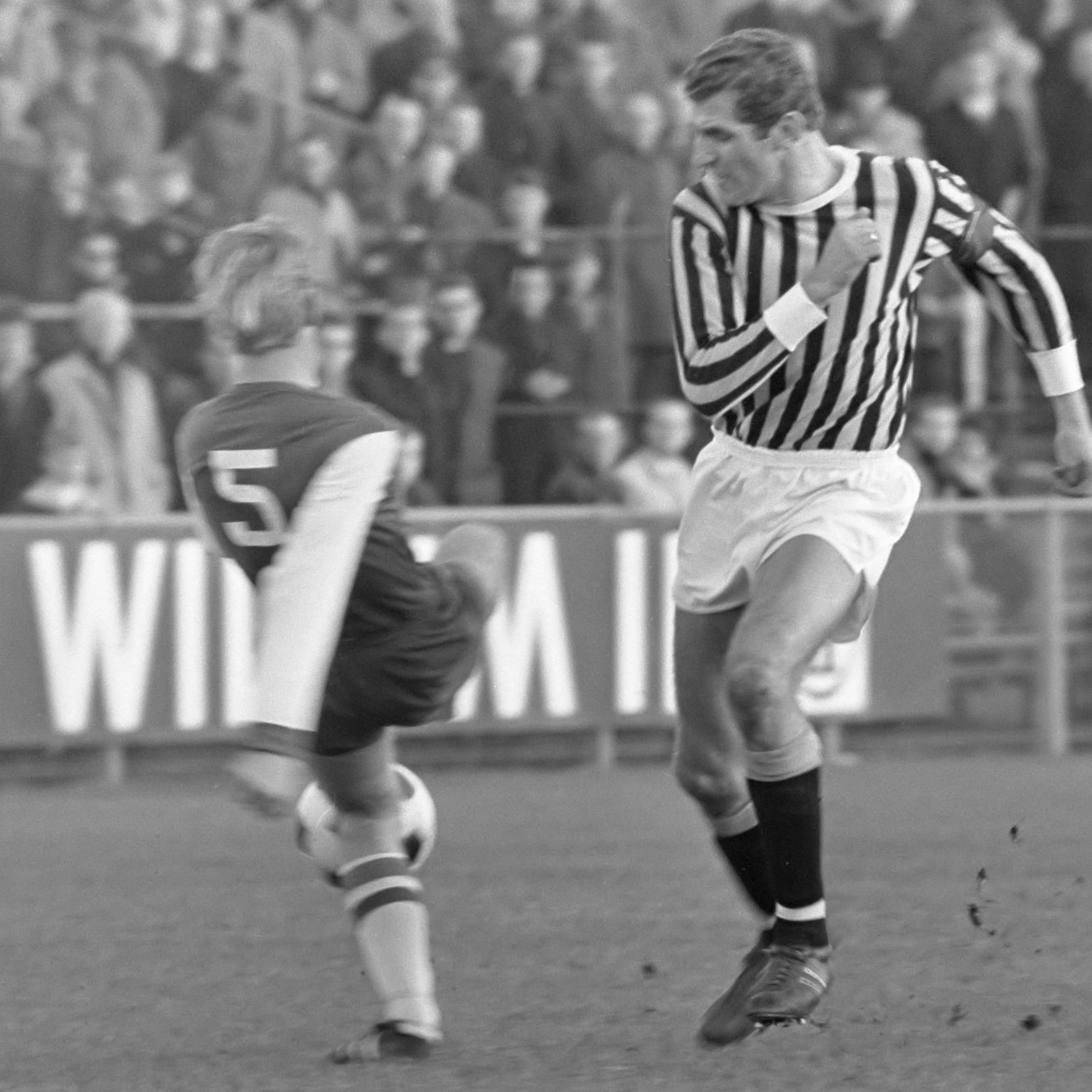
The daily newspaper De Gelderlander conducted a survey in which fans voted Henk Bosveld (r.) as the best Vitesse-player of the twentieth century.

Name	Pos	Nat	Years at Club	Games	Goals
Bert Jacobs	Coach	(Netherlands)	1988–1993	—N/a	—N/a
Just Göbel	GK	(Netherlands)	1909–1924	116	0
Willem Hesselink	DF	(Netherlands)	1892–1919	79	38
Theo Bos	DF	(Netherlands)	1983–1998	429	1
Edward Sturing	DF	(Netherlands)	1987–1988	383	3
John van den Brom	MF	(Netherlands)	1986–2001	378	110
Theo Janssen	MF	(Netherlands)	1998–2014	242	30
Dik Herberts	FW	(Netherlands)	1947–1959	220	49
Toon Huiberts	FW	(Netherlands)	1951–1968	469	71
Henk Bosveld	FW	(Netherlands)	1968–1979	191	82
Nikos Machlas	FW	(Greece)	1996–1999	92	70
Dejan Čurović	FW	(Serbia)	1994–2000	109	47

== Other teams ==
=== Vitesse II ===
Vitesse's reserve team (Under-21) currently plays in the Beloften Eredivisie. It plays its home matches at Papendal and it is coached by Joseph Oosting. The team is composed mostly of professional footballers, who are often recent graduates from the highest youth level (Vitesse U19) serving their first professional contract as a reserve, or players who are otherwise unable to play in the first team.

==== Honours ====
The team's honours:

- Derde Divisie
  - Champions: 2018
- Beloften Eredivisie
  - Champions: 1993, 2015
- KNVB Reserve Cup
  - Winners: 1998, 2002, 2011
- KNVB District (South)
  - Champions: 1992, 1993
- KNVB District Cup (East)
  - Winners: 1990

=== Amateur team ===
In 1984, it was decided to divide the professional and amateur sections of the club. The professional section was renamed SBV (Stichting Betaald Voetbal – "Professional Football Foundation") Vitesse whilst the amateur section became "(AVC) Vitesse 1892", who played their home matches at the Sportcomplex Valkenhuizen. In total, the club has won five trophies; one Derde Klasse title, one Vierde Klasse title, one Zesde Klasse title and two Arnhem Cups. In 2009, Vitesse 1892 was declared bankrupt. The amateur section has produced a number of professional players including Andy van der Meijde, Nicky Hofs, Léon Hese, Erwin van de Looi and Theo Janssen.

=== Vitesse Legends ===
Vitesse Legends are a beneficiary team that was initiated by Ben Snelders, Leo de Kleermaeker and Dik Herberts in the 1990s, competing in at least one match a year, usually in the name of charity and/or to bid farewell to retiring former Vitesse players. The team is made up of various members of the Club van 100 of Vitesse who will come out of retirement for this match to face the current Vitesse squad. Past participants have included Theo Janssen, Marc van Hintum, Edward Sturing, Ruud Knol, Remco van der Schaaf, Nicky Hofs, Erwin van de Looi, Glenn Helder, Philip Cocu, John van den Brom, Theo Bos, Martin Laamers, Michael Dingsdag, Roberto Straal, Frans Thijssen, Dejan Čurović, Jhon van Beukering and Huub Loeffen.

== National team players ==
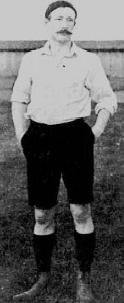
Willem Hesselink.

A number of Vitesse players have represented the Netherlands national team, the first official international being Willem Hesselink. He was one of the founders of Vitesse in 1892 at age 14. In 1905 he started in the first ever home match of the Netherlands national football team, a 4–0 victory against Belgium. Some historians attribute one of the goals scored to him. Just Göbel played 22 matches for the Dutch team, being best remembered for his numerous saves during the 2–1 win over England's amateurs and his bronze medal in the football tournament of the 1912 Summer Olympics. The record number of Vitesse players for the Netherlands was three, which occurred on two occasions in 1989. The following players were called up to represent the Netherlands national team in international football and received caps during their tenure with Vitesse:

- (Netherlands) Willem Hesselink
- (Netherlands) Just Göbel
- (Netherlands) Jan de Natris
- (Netherlands) Gerrit Horsten
- (Netherlands) Sjaak Alberts
- (Netherlands) Wim Hendriks
- (Netherlands) Hans Gillhaus
- (Netherlands) Martin Laamers
- (Netherlands) Bart Latuheru
- (Netherlands) Edward Sturing
- (Netherlands) John van den Brom
- (Netherlands) Pierre van Hooijdonk
- (Netherlands) Glenn Helder
- (Netherlands) Roy Makaay
- (Netherlands) Patrick van Aanholt
- (Netherlands) Ferdi Vierklau
- (Netherlands) Martijn Reuser
- (Netherlands) Sander Westerveld
- (Netherlands) Victor Sikora
- (Netherlands) Theo Janssen
- (Netherlands) Piet Velthuizen
- (Netherlands) Marco van Ginkel
- (Netherlands) Davy Pröpper

== Notable former players ==
- (Netherlands) Phillip Cocu (1990–1995)
- (Netherlands) Pierre van Hooijdonk (1999–2000)
- (Netherlands) Roy Makaay (1993–1997)
- (Netherlands) Raimond van der Gouw (1988–1996)
- (Netherlands) Glenn Helder (1993–1995)
- (Netherlands) Orlando Trustfull (1997–2001)
- (Netherlands) Frans Thijssen (1988–1991)
- (Netherlands) Peter Bosz (1981–1984)
- (Netherlands) Henk ten Cate (1975–1976)
- (Netherlands) Sander Westerveld (1996–1999)
- (Netherlands) Edwin Zoetebier (2000–2001)
- (Netherlands) Ricky van Wolfswinkel (2008–2017)
- (Netherlands) Marco van Ginkel (2010–2013)
- (Netherlands) Davy Pröpper (2010–2015)
- (Netherlands) Patrick van Aanholt (2012–2014)
- (Netherlands) Stijn Schaars (2003–2005)
- (Netherlands) Riechedly Bazoer (2019–2022)
- (Netherlands) Paul Verhaegh (2006–2010)
- (Netherlands) Eloy Room (2008–2017)
- (Netherlands) Hans Gillhaus (1993–1994)
- (Netherlands) Willem Hesselink (1894–1919)
- (Netherlands) Henk Bosveld (1968–1979)
- (Netherlands) Frans de Munck (1965–1967)
- (Netherlands) Dick Schoenaker (1986–1988)
- (Netherlands) Just Göbel (1909–1924)
- (Netherlands) Alexander Büttner (2007–2019)
- (Netherlands) Remko Pasveer (2017–2021)
- (Belgium) Gert Claessens (2001–2003)
- (Belgium) Bob Peeters (2000–2003)
- (Belgium) Onur Kaya (2005–2010)
- (Belgium) Loïs Openda (2020–2021)
- (Germany) Paulo Rink (2004)
- (Germany) Dieter Burdenski (1990)
- (Germany) Simon Cziommer (2012–2013)
- (England) Lewis Baker (2015–2017)
- (England) Mason Mount (2017–2018)
- (France) Didier Martel (2000–2003)
- (France) Gaël Kakuta (2012–2013)
- (Italy) Marco De Marchi (1997–2000)
- (Italy) Luca Caldirola (2010–2011)
- (Spain) Jordi López (2011)
- (Portugal) Eduardo Carvalho (2018–2019)
- (Scotland) Scott Booth (1998–1999)
- (Wales) Nick Deacy (1979–1980)
- (Greece) Nikos Machlas (1996–1999)
- (Israel) Eli Dasa (2019–2022)
- (Sweden) Lasse Nilsson (2008–2011)
- (Norway) Martin Ødegaard (2018–2019)
- (Denmark) Jacob Rasmussen (2020–2021)
- (Kosovo) Milot Rashica (2015–2018)
- (Czech Republic) Tomáš Kalas (2011–2013)
- (Slovenia) Tim Matavž (2017–2020)
- (Georgia (country)) Guram Kashia (2010–2018)
- (Georgia (country)) Valeri Qazaishvili (2011–2017)
- (Serbia) Slobodan Rajković (2010–2011)
- (Serbia) Nemanja Matić (2010–2011)
- (Serbia) Danko Lazović (2006–2007)
- (Serbia) Dejan Stefanović (1999–2003)
- (Serbia) Vladimir Stojković (2007)
- (Romania) Ștefan Nanu (1999–2003)
- (United States) Matt Miazga (2016–2018)
- (Brazil) Claudemir de Souza (2008–2010)
- (Brazil) Lucas Piazon (2013–2014)
- (Brazil) Jonathan Reis (2012–2013)
- (Suriname) Lloyd Doesburg (1981–1986)
- (Morocco) Zakaria Labyad (2014–2015)
- (Morocco) Ismaïl Aissati (2010–2011)
- (Morocco) Oussama Tannane (2019–2021)
- (Ghana) Anthony Annan (2011–2012)
- (Ghana) Christian Atsu (2013–2014)
- (Ghana) Riga Mustapha (1998–2003)
- (Ivory Coast) Wilfried Bony (2011–2013)
- (Mali) Mahamadou Diarra (1999–2002)
- (Nigeria) Ben Iroha (1992–1996)
- (Nigeria) Tijani Babangida (2001–2002)
- (Zimbabwe) Marvelous Nakamba (2014–2017)
- (Burkina Faso) Bertrand Traoré (2014–2015)
- (South Africa) Thulani Serero (2017–2019)
- (Ecuador) Giovanny Espinoza (2007–2008)
- (Japan) Keisuke Honda (2019)
- (China) Yu Hai (2007–2008)

== See also ==
- Dutch football league teams
- Vitesse Dallas, an American indoor football club
- National Sports Centre Papendal
- GelreDome

== Literature ==
- Van Mierlo, Joost: Verspeelde Energie. Vitesse en Nuon, verslag van een explosieve relatie. SUN, Nijmegen 2001, ISBN 9789058750327.
- Molenaar, Arjen: 111 Jaar Vitesse. De sportieve geschiedenis van Vitesse 1892-2003 Vitesse, Arnhem 2003, ISBN 9090173005.
- Van Roosmalen, Marcel: Je hebt het niet van mij. Een tragi-komisch verslag over de soap bij Vitesse. Hard gras, Amsterdam 2006, ISBN 9046800962.
- Van Roosmalen, Marcel: Het Jaar van de Adelaar. Hard gras, Amsterdam 2009, ISBN 9789046805664.
- Van Roosmalen, Marcel: Geef me nog twee dagen. Hard gras, Amsterdam 2011, ISBN 9789071359446.
- Bierhaus, Peter: Vites! 9 verhalen over onvoorwaardelijke liefde voor Vitesse. Ctrl-E, Arnhem 2011, ISBN 9789081345781.
- Remco, Kok: Een Arnhemmer is niet voor Ajax. Lecturium, Zoetermeer 2014, ISBN 9789048431816.
- Reurink, Ferry: Elke dag Vitesse. 125 jaar clubgeschiedenis in 366 verhalen. Kontrast, Oosterbeek 2017, ISBN 9789492411990.
