= Bart Latuheru =

Dutch footballer

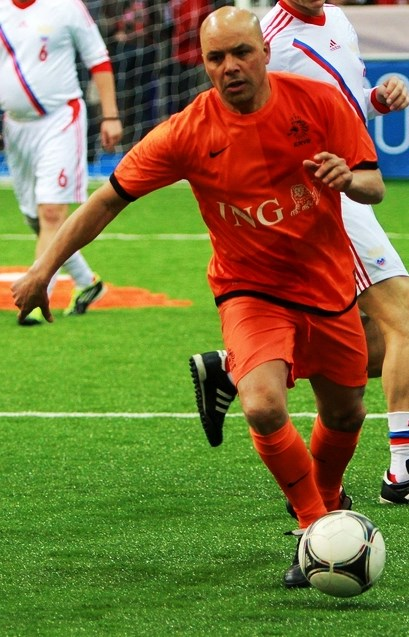

Personal information
- Full name: Barnabas Anthony Peter Latuheru
- Date of birth: 8 November 1965 (age 60)
- Place of birth: Capelle aan den IJssel, Netherlands
- Position: Midfielder

Youth career
- CVV Zwervers
- Sparta Rotterdam
- XerxesDZB

Senior career*
Years	Team	Apps	(Gls)
1985–1989	SBV Excelsior	118	(13)
1989–1996	Vitesse	191	(28)
1996–1997	AZ	33	(0)
1997–2002	N.E.C.	136	(7)
2002–2005	SV Deltasport		
2005–2006	XerxesDZB		
2006–2007	SC Neptunus		

International career
1989	Netherlands	1	(0)
- * Club domestic league appearances and goals

Barnabas Anthony Peter Latuheru (born 8 November 1965) is a Dutch retired professional footballer.

== Personal life ==
He is of Moluccan heritage.
