= Gerrit Horsten =

Dutch footballer

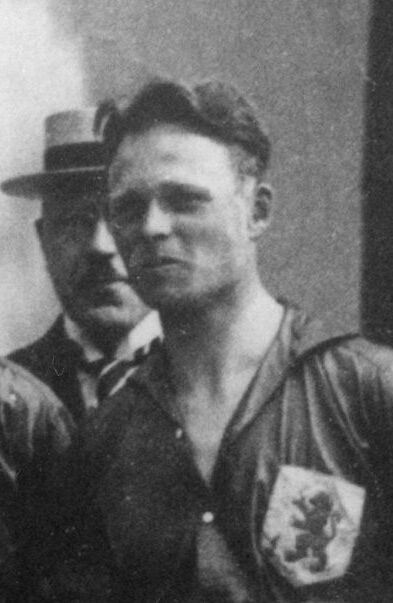
- Horsten (1924)

Personal information
- Full name: Gerardus Antonius Maria Horsten
- Date of birth: 16 April 1900
- Place of birth: Tilburg, Netherlands
- Date of death: 23 July 1961 (aged 61)
- Place of death: Arnhem, Netherlands

Senior career*
| Years | Team | Apps | (Gls) |
| 1922–1925 | Willem II | | |
| 1925–1935 | Vitesse | | |

International career
| 1924-1928 | Netherlands | 6 | (0) |

Managerial career
- 1938–1946: Vitesse
- * Club domestic league appearances and goals

Gerrit Horsten (16 April 1900 – 23 July 1961) was a Dutch footballer. He competed in the men's tournament at the 1924 Summer Olympics.

He played as a midfielder for Willem II and Vitesse and earned 6 caps for the Netherlands.

Horsten later managed Vitesse between 1938 and 1946.
