= Monnikenhuize =

Building in the Netherlands

Coordinates: 51.994167°N 5.931111°E

Monnikenhuize [ˈmɔ.nɪk.ən.ˌɦœy̯.zə] was a multi-use stadium in Arnhem, Netherlands. It was used mostly for football matches and hosted the home matches of SBV Vitesse. The stadium name means "monk's houses," referring to the Carthusian monastery which stood on the site from the 14th to 16th centuries.

The stadium was able to hold 7,500 people. The stadium was opened in 1915. It was closed in 1950 when Nieuw Monnikenhuize opened.

For the 1928 Summer Olympics in Amsterdam, it hosted the consolation first round match between Chile and Mexico on 5 June 1928.
