= George Roper (footballer) =

English football manager

Managerial career
- Years: Team
- 1946–1947: Vitesse Arnhem

George Roper was an English football manager. He coached Dutch club side Vitesse Arnhem between 1946 and 1947.
