= Jan Veenstra =

Dutch footballer (1942–2023)

- Veenstra playing for Go Ahead in 1969

Personal information
- Full name: Johannes Theodorus Veenstra
- Date of birth: 21 October 1942
- Place of birth: Elden, German-occupied Netherlands
- Date of death: 27 October 2023 (aged 81)
- Place of death: Bathmen, Netherlands
- Position: Defender

Youth career
- 1954-1960: Vitesse

Senior career*
Years	Team	Apps	(Gls)
1960–1967	Vitesse	113	(60)
1967–1974	Go Ahead Eagles	152	(5)
1974–1976	PEC Zwolle		(3)
- * Club domestic league appearances and goals

Johannes Theodorus Veenstra (21 October 1942 – 27 October 2023) was a Dutch footballer who played as a defender.

== Career ==
Born in Elden, Veenstra started his career at hometown club Vitesse in 1960 and scored 60 goals in 113 matches for the club. He was Vitesse's top goalscorer with 16 goals when they won the 1965–66 Tweede Divisie title, clinching promotion to the second tier. He then joined Go Ahead Eagles in 1967. He played 174 official games for the Deventer outfit. He finished his playing career at PEC Zwolle.

Veenstra later managed amateur sides VV Diepenveen, WZC Wapenveld, SV Schalkhaar, VV Daventria, VV Holten en Koninklijke UD.
