= Just Göbel =

Dutch footballer

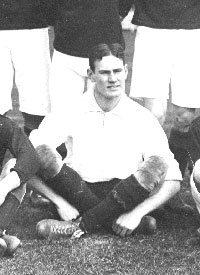
- Göbel with Netherlands in April 1914

Personal information
- Full name: Marius Jan Göbel
- Date of birth: 21 November 1891
- Place of birth: Surabaya, Dutch East Indies
- Date of death: 5 March 1984 (aged 92)
- Place of death: Ede, Netherlands
- Position: Goalkeeper

Senior career*
Years	Team	Apps	(Gls)
1910–1923	Vitesse		

International career
1911–1919	Netherlands	22	(0)
Medal record
Men's football
Representing Netherlands
Olympic Games
Bronze medal – third place	1912 Stockholm	Team competition
- * Club domestic league appearances and goals

Marius Jan "Just" Göbel (November 21, 1891 in Surabaya – March 5, 1984 in Ede) was a Dutch amateur football player.

== Career ==
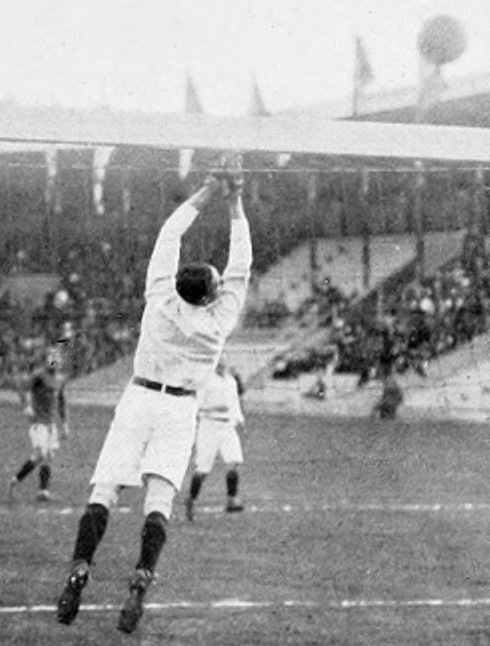
Göbel making a save at the Olympics

Göbel, who played for Vitesse Arnhem, succeeded Reinier Beeuwkes as the Dutch national goalkeeper in 1911. He was known for being the first Dutch keeper to try to catch the ball rather than stomp it away. He starred in the 1912 KNVB Cup defeat to Haarlem.

He played 22 matches for the Dutch team, being best remembered for his numerous saves during the 2-1 win over England's amateurs and his bronze medal in the football tournament of the 1912 Summer Olympics.

During the First World War, he studied medicine. The West Stand at Vitesse's GelreDome was named in his honour in 2016.
