= Herman Veenendaal =

Dutch entrepreneur, investor and footballer

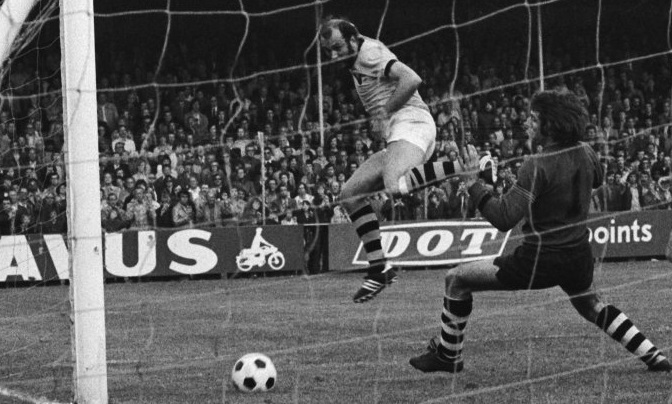
- Herman Veenendaal in 1976

Personal information
- Date of birth: 23 September 1947 (age 79)
- Place of birth: Arnhem, Netherlands

Senior career*
Years	Team	Apps	(Gls)
1971–1984	Vitesse	185	(76)
- * Club domestic league appearances and goals

Herman Veenendaal (born 23 September 1947, Arnhem) is a Dutch entrepreneur, investor, and former footballer who played as a centre-forward. Veenendaal spent his entire career for Vitesse Arnhem, making a total of 185 appearances in 6 seasons with his club. In 1974, he was crowned the Eerste Divisie top goalscorer of the 1973-74 season with 23 goals.
