= Marc van Hintum =

Dutch football executive and former player (born 1967)

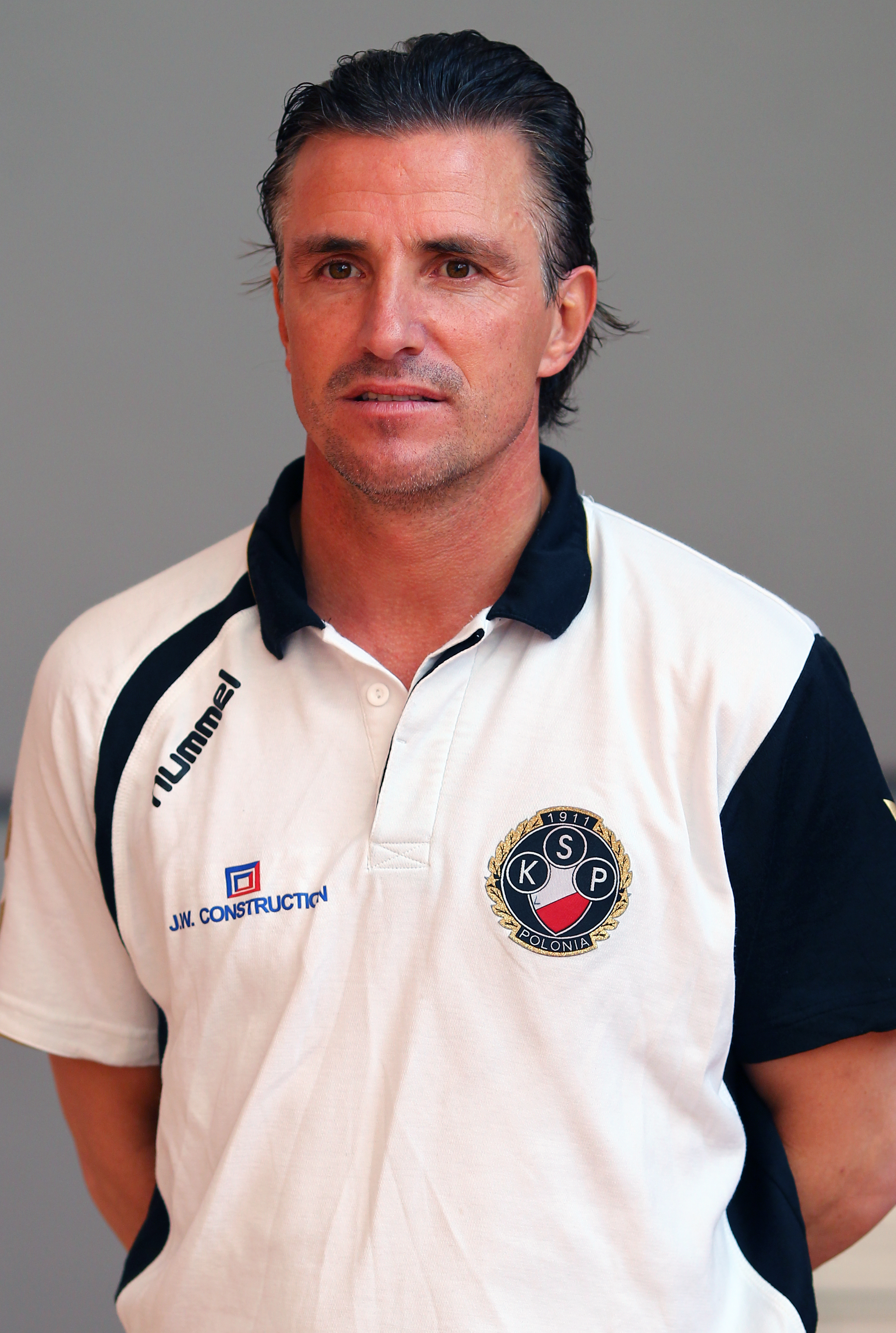

Personal information
- Full name: Marinus Gerardus Adrianus van Hintum
- Date of birth: 22 June 1967 (age 59)
- Place of birth: Oss, Netherlands
- Position: Left-back

Team information
- Current team: Go Ahead Eagles (technical manager)

Youth career
- RKSV Cito
- SV Ruwaard
- TOP Oss
- RKSV Margriet

Senior career*
Years	Team	Apps	(Gls)
1987–1988	Helmond Sport	30	(1)
1988–1992	RKC	118	(10)
1992–1997	Willem II	96	(19)
1997–2001	Vitesse	126	(3)
2001–2003	Hannover 96	17	(0)
2003–2005	RKC	46	(0)
Total		433	(33)

International career
1998–2001	Netherlands	8	(0)

Managerial career
- 2011: Polonia Warsaw (assistant)
- * Club domestic league appearances and goals

Marinus Gerardus Adrianus "Marc" van Hintum (born 22 June 1967) is a Dutch football executive and former player and coach who is serving as a technical director at Go Ahead Eagles.

== Playing career ==
He played professionally for Helmond Sport, Willem II, Vitesse, Hannover 96 and RKC Waalwijk, as well as for the Netherlands national team.

== Coaching and executive career ==
In January 2011, Van Hintum was appointed new assistant coach of Polonia Warsaw, assisting head coach Theo Bos, but was appointed technical manager at Willem II in April that year. In 2014 he returned to Vitesse and worked in various positions for the club before he was sacked in 2020.

In 2021, Van Hintum was appointed as scout for VVV, and he was promoted to head of scouting the following year. In 2023, Van Hintum succeeded Willem Janssen as technical manager of the club.

In 2025 he became a technical director at Go Ahead Eagles..
