= 1981 UEFA Cup final =

Association football match

- Event: 1980–81 UEFA Cup
Ipswich Town	AZ '67
(England)	(Netherlands)
5	4
- on aggregate

First leg
Ipswich Town	AZ '67
3	0
- Date: 6 May 1981
- Venue: Portman Road, Ipswich
- Referee: Adolf Prokop (East Germany)
- Attendance: 27,532

Second leg
AZ '67	Ipswich Town
4	2
- Date: 20 May 1981
- Venue: Olympic Stadium, Amsterdam
- Referee: Walter Eschweiler (West Germany)
- Attendance: 28,500

The 1981 UEFA Cup final was an association football match played over two legs between AZ '67 of the Netherlands and Ipswich Town of England. The first leg was played at Portman Road, Ipswich, on 6 May 1981 and the second leg was played on 20 May 1981 at the Olympic Stadium, Amsterdam. It was the final of the 1980–81 season of European cup competition, the UEFA Cup. Both Ipswich and AZ '67 were appearing in their first European final.

Each club needed to progress through five rounds to reach the final. Matches were contested over two legs, with a match at each team's home ground. The majority of Ipswich's ties were won by at least two goals, the exception being the second round against Bohemians of Prague, which Ipswich won 3–2 on aggregate. AZ '67's early ties were one-sided: they won the first three rounds by at least five goals on aggregate, but their quarter-final and semi-final ties were won on aggregate by a single goal.

Watched by a crowd of 27,532 at Portman Road, Ipswich took the lead in the first leg when John Wark scored from the penalty spot. Second half goals from Frans Thijssen and Paul Mariner meant Ipswich won the first leg 3–0. Therefore, in the second leg at the Olympic Stadium in Amsterdam, Ipswich had to avoid losing by three clear goals to win the competition. A crowd of 28,500 watched Ipswich take an early lead courtesy of a Thijssen goal. AZ '67 quickly equalised through Kurt Welzl before taking the lead after a goal from Johnny Metgod. Wark scored again for Ipswich to equalise the leg, but AZ '67 struck back through Pier Tol and Jos Jonker. No further goals were scored, and Ipswich won the final 5–4 on aggregate to win their first and, as of 2025, only European trophy.

== Background ==
The UEFA Cup was an annual football club competition organised by UEFA between 1971 and 2009 for eligible clubs. It was the second-tier competition of European club football, ranking below the UEFA European Cup. From 2010, the UEFA Cup evolved into the Europa League. Ipswich Town had made their first appearance in European football in the 1962–63 European Cup and, before the 1980–81 season, their most successful tournament was the 1973–74 UEFA Cup, where they were knocked out in the quarter-finals by Lokomotive Leipzig. This was Ipswich's eighth European campaign. AZ's first European experience was in the 1977-78 UEFA Cup where they reached the second round, losing 5–4 on penalties to FC Barcelona. The 1980–81 UEFA Cup campaign was their third season in European football.

Ipswich Town qualified for the 1980–81 UEFA Cup as a result of finishing third in the Football League First Division the previous season, behind Manchester United, who also qualified for the UEFA Cup, and Liverpool, who qualified for the 1980–81 European Cup. AZ '67 finished the 1979–80 Eredivisie season in second place, three points behind champions Ajax. Ipswich and AZ had faced each other in two matches before, in the two-legged first round of the 1978–79 European Cup Winners' Cup which the English club won 2–0 on aggregate.

== Route to the final ==
=== Ipswich Town F.C. ===
Round	Opposition	First leg	Second leg	Aggregate score
1st	(Greece) Aris	5–1 (h)	1–3 (a)	6–4
2nd	(Czechoslovakia) Bohemians	3–0 (h)	0–2 (a)	3–2
3rd	(Poland) Widzew Łódź	5–0 (h)	0–1 (a)	5–1
Quarter-final	(France) Saint-Étienne	4–1 (a)	3–1 (h)	7–2
Semi-final	(West Germany) Köln	1–0 (h)	1–0 (a)	2–0

Ipswich's 1980–81 UEFA Cup campaign commenced in the first round against the Greek team Aris Salonika. The first leg, at Ipswich's home ground Portman Road, was an ill-disciplined match which saw Aris' Giorgos Foiros sent off after a second yellow card towards the end of the first half. Ipswich were awarded three penalties, all of which were converted by John Wark, who scored a fourth from open play. Paul Mariner struck a fifth for Ipswich before Aris scored from the spot through Theodoros Pallas in what would be a consolation goal in a 5–1 win for Ipswich, described as a "sparkling" victory by the Belfast Telegraph. Two weeks later, Aris won 3–1 in the return leg, taking an early 2–0 lead with goals from Thalis Tsirimokos and Konstantinos Drampis, before Eric Gates pulled one back for Ipswich. Although Zeleliolis scored a third for Aris midway through the second half, Ipswich progressed to the next round 6–4 on aggregate, where they faced Bohemians of Prague. A 3–0 home win saw Wark score twice more; he was then substituted off with a tendon injury, to be replaced by Kevin Beattie who scored a third for Ipswich with a free kick, described in The Times as a "thunderbolt". The goal would prove to be pivotal as Ipswich, without regular goalkeeper Paul Cooper, midfielder Frans Thijssen and striker Mariner, all through injury, lost the away leg 2–0 with goals from Antonín Panenka and Tibor Mičinec. Ipswich still qualified for the third round 3–2 on aggregate.

Three weeks later, Ipswich faced Widzew Łódź from Poland, who had defeated Manchester United and Juventus in previous rounds, at Portman Road. Wark once again found the net, scoring a hat-trick; goals from Alan Brazil and Mariner completed a comprehensive 5–0 victory. The only negative was a trip to hospital for Mick Mills for 15 stitches in a cut to his shin. On a frozen pitch which many observers considered to be dangerous, Widzew Łódź won the away leg 1–0 with Marek Pięta scoring for them but went out 5–1 on aggregate. The lead from the first leg allowed the Ipswich manager Bobby Robson to withdraw Mariner and Arnold Mühren: he noted at the time that he was prioritising Ipswich's league challenge.

After a three-month break, Ipswich faced the French team AS Saint-Étienne in the quarter-finals in March 1981, the first leg being held in the Stade Geoffroy-Guichard. The Dutch player Johnny Rep put the home team in the lead after 16 minutes, but a brace from Mariner and goals from Mühren and Wark ensured Ipswich took a 4–1 lead into the second leg. The victory against the French team has been described by the Ipswich Star as one of the greatest performances in Ipswich's history. Robson noted: "We have demolished a good side with one of the best victories anyone has achieved in Europe in the past ten years." Ipswich won the game at Portman Road 3–1 with goals from Terry Butcher, Mariner and another penalty from Wark, while Saint-Étienne's consolation goal came from Jacques Zimako. Winning the tie 7–2 on aggregate, Ipswich progressed to the semi-finals where they met the German side 1. FC Köln. Both legs finished 1–0 to Ipswich: Wark scored again in the home leg, his 12th goal of the European campaign, and Butcher headed in a Mills free kick in Cologne. The 2–0 aggregate victory ensured that Ipswich qualified for their first (and, as of 2023, their only) European cup final, where they would face Dutch team AZ '67.

=== AZ '67 ===
Round	Opposition	First leg	Second leg	Aggregate score
1st	(Luxembourg) Red Boys Differdange	6–0 (h)	4–0 (a)	10–0
2nd	(Bulgaria) Levski Sofia	1–1 (a)	5–0 (h)	6–1
3rd	(Socialist Federal Republic of Yugoslavia) Radnički Niš	2–2 (a)	5–0 (h)	7–2
Quarter-final	(Belgium) Lokeren	2–0 (h)	0–1 (a)	2–1
Semi-final	(France) FC Sochaux	1–1 (a)	3–2 (h)	4–3

AZ '67 started their European campaign in the first round at home against the Luxembourg team Red Boys Differdange, against whom AZ had won 16–1 on aggregate in the opening round of the 1977–78 UEFA Cup. This time, the first leg ended 6–0 with goals from Hugo Hovenkamp, Kristen Nygaard, Jan Peters (2), Kurt Welzl and Pier Tol. The second leg, played in front of 1,500 spectators at the Stade du Thillenberg, Differdange, ended in a 4–0 victory to the Dutch team, which included a Kees Kist hat-trick.

In the second round, AZ faced the Bulgarian side Levski Spartak with the first leg held at the Georgi Asparuhov Stadium in Sofia. Kist put the Dutch club ahead early in the second half but Emil Spasov equalised and the game ended 1–1. The second leg was one-sided as AZ won 5–0 in front of 15,000 spectators at the Alkmaarderhout. Tol scored the opening goal in the first half, and second-half goals from Nygaard, Kist, Peters, and a second from Tol ensured a 6–1 aggregate victory and qualification for the third round against the Yugoslav team Radnički Niš. The first leg was played at the Čair Stadium in Niš in front of a crowd of 27,000 and once again saw AZ take the lead through a first-half Tol goal. Radnički Niš equalised early in the second half with a penalty from Dragan Pantelić before AZ regained the lead with a goal from Kist. With less than ten minutes remaining, Aleksandar Panajotović equalised for Niš and the game ended 2–2. At home, AZ once again dominated their opposition, with another Kist hat-trick and goals from Nygaard and Welzl ending the game 5–0 and the tie 7–2 on aggregate to the Dutch club.

Three months later, AZ faced their quarter-final opponents Lokeren of Belgium. The first leg was played at the Alkmaarderhout in front of 13,400 spectators. Two first half goals, from Tol and Welzl, settled the match and AZ took a 2–0 advantage into the second leg. The second leg saw AZ's only defeat on their route to the final, losing 1–0 to a first-half René Verheyen goal, but the Dutch side still progressed to the semi-final, winning 2–1 on aggregate. The first leg of the semi-final, against French opponents Sochaux took place at the Stade Auguste Bonal in Montbéliard. Peter Arntz opened the scoring for AZ early in the match, but Bernard Genghini equalised soon after, and the game ended 1–1. The second leg, at the Alkmaarderhout, saw Sochaux take an early lead through Genghini before goals from Metgod, Jonker and Peters gave the Dutch team an aggregate 4–2 lead. Thierry Meyer scored a late consolation goal for the French club but the game ended 3–2 to AZ, and the Dutch team qualified for their first European cup final.

== First leg ==
=== Summary ===
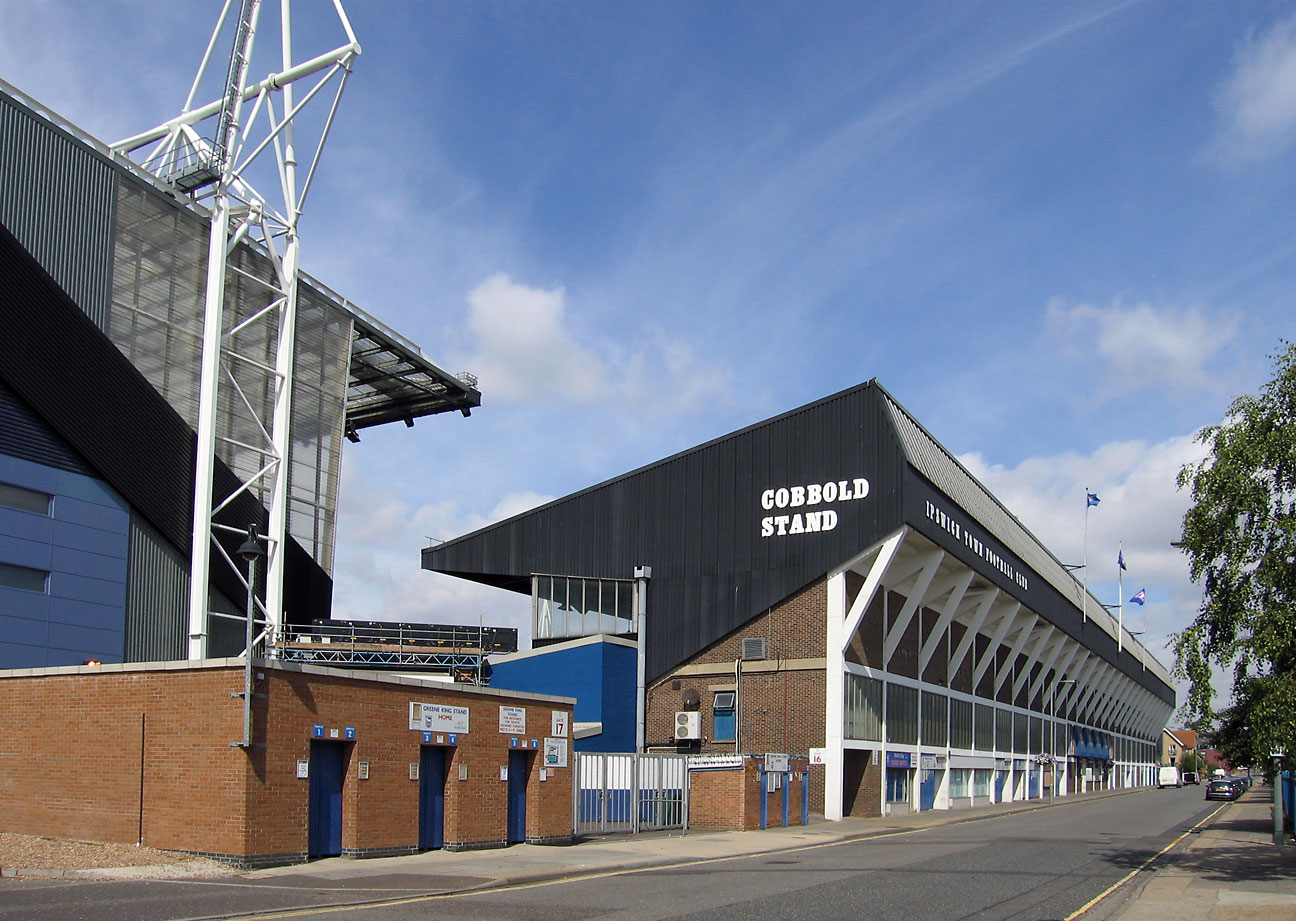
The first leg of the final was played at Portman Road.

Heading into the first leg of the 1981 UEFA Cup final, several of the Ipswich team played despite carrying injuries: Thijssen was suffering a groin strain, Mariner had an Achilles tendon injury, and Cooper was forced to wear a protective covering for an arm injury sustained in the previous domestic match against Middlesbrough. Gates had also just recovered from a calf injury. This was the club's 65th match of the season. AZ '67, who had defeated Feyenoord in the Eredivisie to win the Dutch league title with six games to spare in their previous match, were able to play their full-strength side, Kist replacing Welzl in the starting eleven.

The first leg took place at Portman Road on 6 May 1981 in front of a crowd of 27,532. Ipswich were denied a strong penalty appeal in the second minute of the first half when the referee, Adolf Prokop, waved away appeals after Gates was brought down by AZ's Richard van der Meer. Butcher exploited AZ's renowned weakness in the air, but his header went just wide, before a shot from Gates was palmed out by the AZ goalkeeper Eddy Treijtel. During the first third of the match, Ipswich won several corners without capitalising but were caught offside numerous times by a disciplined AZ defensive line. Ipswich took the lead through Wark, who had recently been named the PFA Players' Player of the Year, scoring from the penalty spot after 30 minutes following a Hovenkamp handball. It was Wark's 13th goal of the European campaign and which ensured that he had scored in every round of the competition. Russell Osman cut out Tol's subsequent breakaway chance before Thijssen's 39th-minute strike flew over the bar. No further goals were scored and the half ended 1–0 to Ipswich.

A minute into the second half, Ipswich doubled their lead with a header from Dutchman Frans Thijssen after his initial shot was saved by Treijtel. A third goal for Ipswich, this time from Mariner after Brazil had beaten his opposition player and put in a low pass to the near post, saw the English team win the game and take a 3–0 lead into the second leg at the Olympic Stadium in Amsterdam. Such was Ipswich's dominance that they restricted AZ to a single shot on target throughout the match, and only conceded the first corner midway through the second half. Thijssen was named man of the match. After the game, the AZ coach Georg Keßler was circumspect: "there are another 90 minutes to play, but naturally it will be very difficult for us." Robson's future at Ipswich was subject to debate as he had been linked to other clubs including Sunderland, who had offered him a then-British record of £1 million over ten years. He noted: "if we lose this three goal lead in the second leg, I am definitely leaving this club, you can quote me on that."

=== Details ===
6 May 1981
19:30

Ipswich Town (England)	3–0	(Netherlands) AZ '67
Wark 30' (pen.); Thijssen 47'; Mariner 55'	(Report) (Teams)

Portman Road, Ipswich
Attendance: 27,532
Referee: Adolf Prokop (East Germany)

Ipswich Town	AZ '67

GK	1	(England) Paul Cooper
RB	2	(England) Mick Mills (c)
LB	3	(England) Steve McCall
CM	4	(Netherlands) Frans Thijssen
CB	5	(England) Russell Osman
CB	6	(England) Terry Butcher
CM	7	(Scotland) John Wark
CM	8	(Netherlands) Arnold Mühren
CF	9	(England) Paul Mariner
CF	10	(Scotland) Alan Brazil
AM	11	(England) Eric Gates
Manager:
(England) Bobby Robson

GK	1	(Netherlands) Eddy Treijtel
RB	2	(Netherlands) Richard van der Meer
CB	3	(Netherlands) Ronald Spelbos
CB	4	(Netherlands) John Metgod
LB	5	(Netherlands) Hugo Hovenkamp (c)
MF	6	(Netherlands) Jan Peters
MF	7	(Netherlands) Jos Jonker
MF	8	(Netherlands) Peter Arntz
CF	9	(Netherlands) Kees Kist
MF	10	(Denmark) Kristen Nygaard	(substituted off) 57'
CF	11	(Netherlands) Pier Tol
Substitutes:
FW	12	(Austria) Kurt Welzl	(substituted on) 57'
Manager:
(West Germany) Georg Keßler

== Second leg ==
=== Summary ===
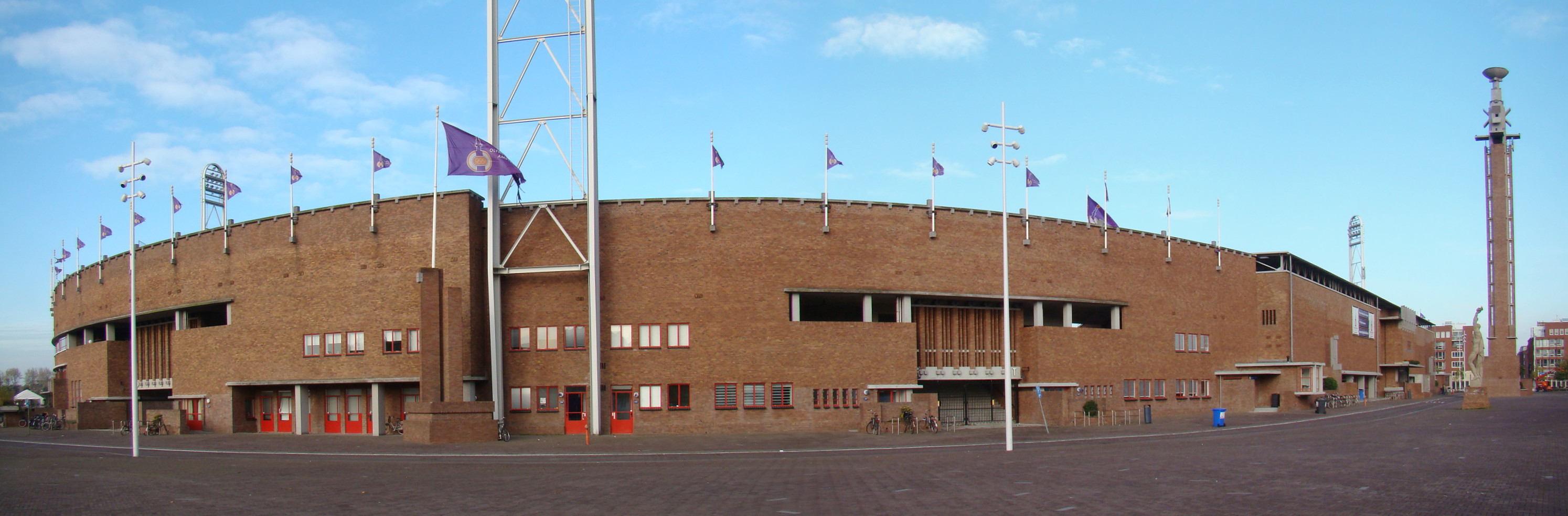
The Olympic Stadium in Amsterdam hosted the second leg of the final.

Ipswich were able to name an unchanged line up for the second leg of the 1981 UEFA Cup final. Both Thijssen and Mariner had responded positively to treatment during the two-week break between the final legs. Van der Meer was the only injury problem for AZ '67.

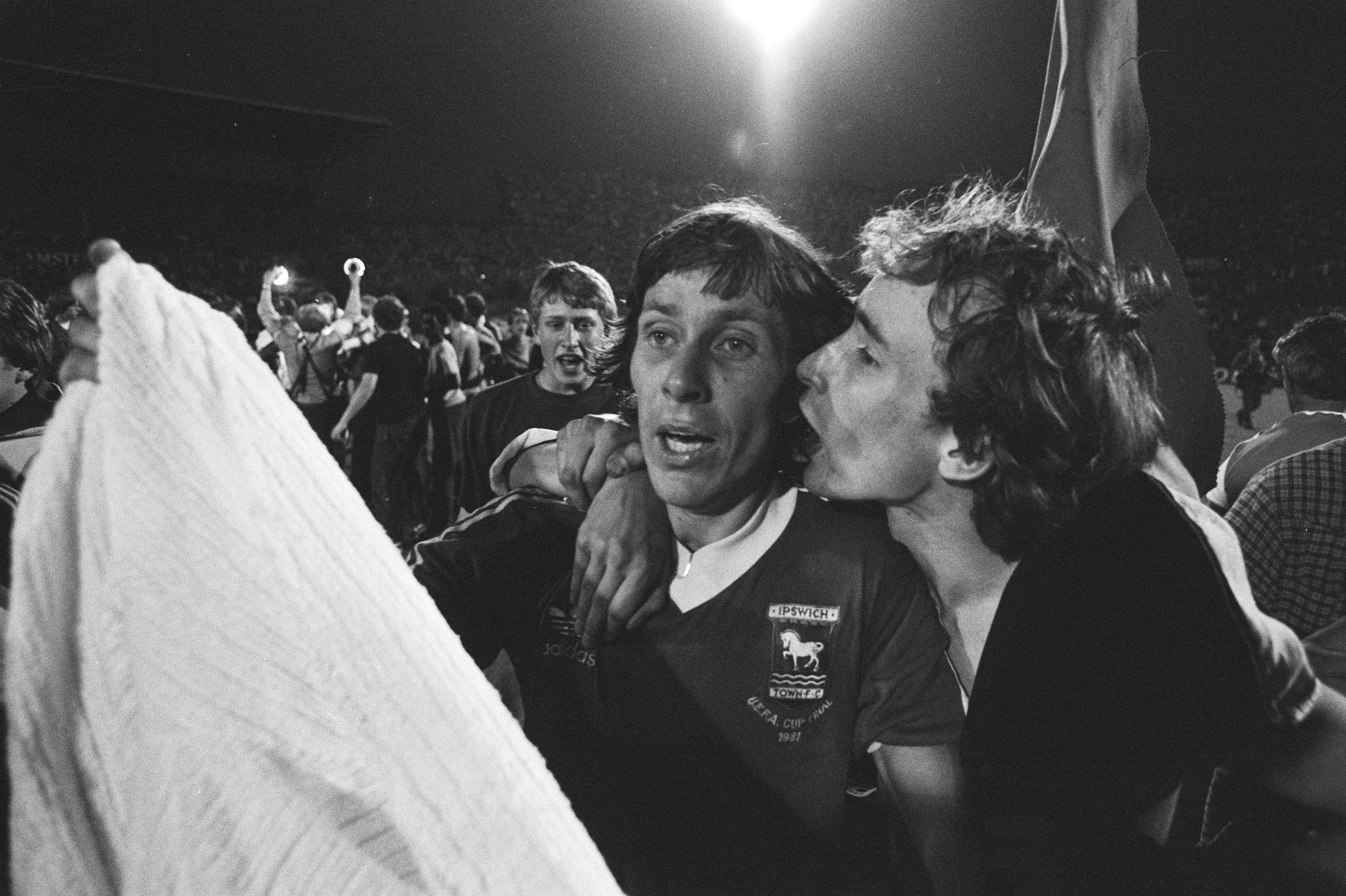
Arnold Muhren celebrating with supporters after the final whistle.

The second leg took place at the Olympic Stadium in Amsterdam on 20 May 1981 in front of a crowd of 28,500. Ipswich took 6,000 travelling fans to the game. Thijssen scored four minutes into the game following a poor clearance of a Gates corner by AZ's Peter Arntz, giving Ipswich a 4–0 aggregate lead. Almost immediately AZ struck back: Hovenkamp's long ball into the area to Metgod brought Cooper out to challenge, but Metgod chipped the ball to Austrian striker Welzl whose header made the score 1–1. Welzl clipped the post shortly afterwards before a Peters cross was headed home by an unmarked Metgod. Wark scored in the 38th minute with a well-struck shot from a corner, before Tol headed in a Jonker pass to make the aggregate score 5–3. Cooper made two saves late in the second half which were described by Mike Green writing in the Aberdeen Press and Journal as "superb", including one to deny a Welzl header from 6 yards (5.5 m). Jonker scored AZ's fourth of the day with a 25-yard free kick with 16 minutes to go. Despite most of the later action taking place in the Ipswich penalty area, the English club held on to win 5–4 on aggregate, and Cooper was named man of the match.

Mühren, one of two Dutchmen playing for Ipswich, later recalled: "most teams would have given up, but AZ suddenly had wings ... AZ seemed possessed that night ... we really had to give all we had to reach the end, by the skin of our teeth – relieved and happy." Robson noted: "it was a little bit of a knife edge and showed we needed those three goals from the home match. It was a nervy performance."

=== Details ===
20 May 1981
19:30

AZ '67 (Netherlands)	4–2	(England) Ipswich Town
Welzl 7'; Metgod 25'; Tol 40'; Jonker 73'	(Report) (Teams)	Thijssen 4'; Wark 32'

Olympic Stadium, Amsterdam
Attendance: 28,500
Referee: Walter Eschweiler (West Germany)

AZ '67	Ipswich Town

GK	1	(Netherlands) Eddy Treijtel
RB	2	(Netherlands) Hans Reijnders
CB	3	(Netherlands) Ronald Spelbos
CB	4	(Netherlands) John Metgod
LB	5	(Netherlands) Hugo Hovenkamp (c)
MF	6	(Netherlands) Jan Peters
CF	7	(Austria) Kurt Welzl	(substituted off) 80'
MF	8	(Netherlands) Peter Arntz
MF	9	(Netherlands) Jos Jonker
MF	10	(Denmark) Kristen Nygaard
CF	11	(Netherlands) Pier Tol	(substituted off) 46'
Substitutes:
FW	12	(Netherlands) Kees Kist	(substituted on) 46'
MF	14	(Netherlands) Rick Talan	(substituted on) 80'
Manager:
(West Germany) Georg Keßler

GK	1	(England) Paul Cooper
RB	2	(England) Mick Mills (c)
LB	3	(England) Steve McCall
CM	4	(Netherlands) Frans Thijssen
CB	5	(England) Russell Osman
CB	6	(England) Terry Butcher
CM	7	(Scotland) John Wark
CM	8	(Netherlands) Arnold Mühren
CF	9	(England) Paul Mariner
CF	10	(Scotland) Alan Brazil
AM	11	(England) Eric Gates
Manager:
(England) Bobby Robson

== Post-match ==
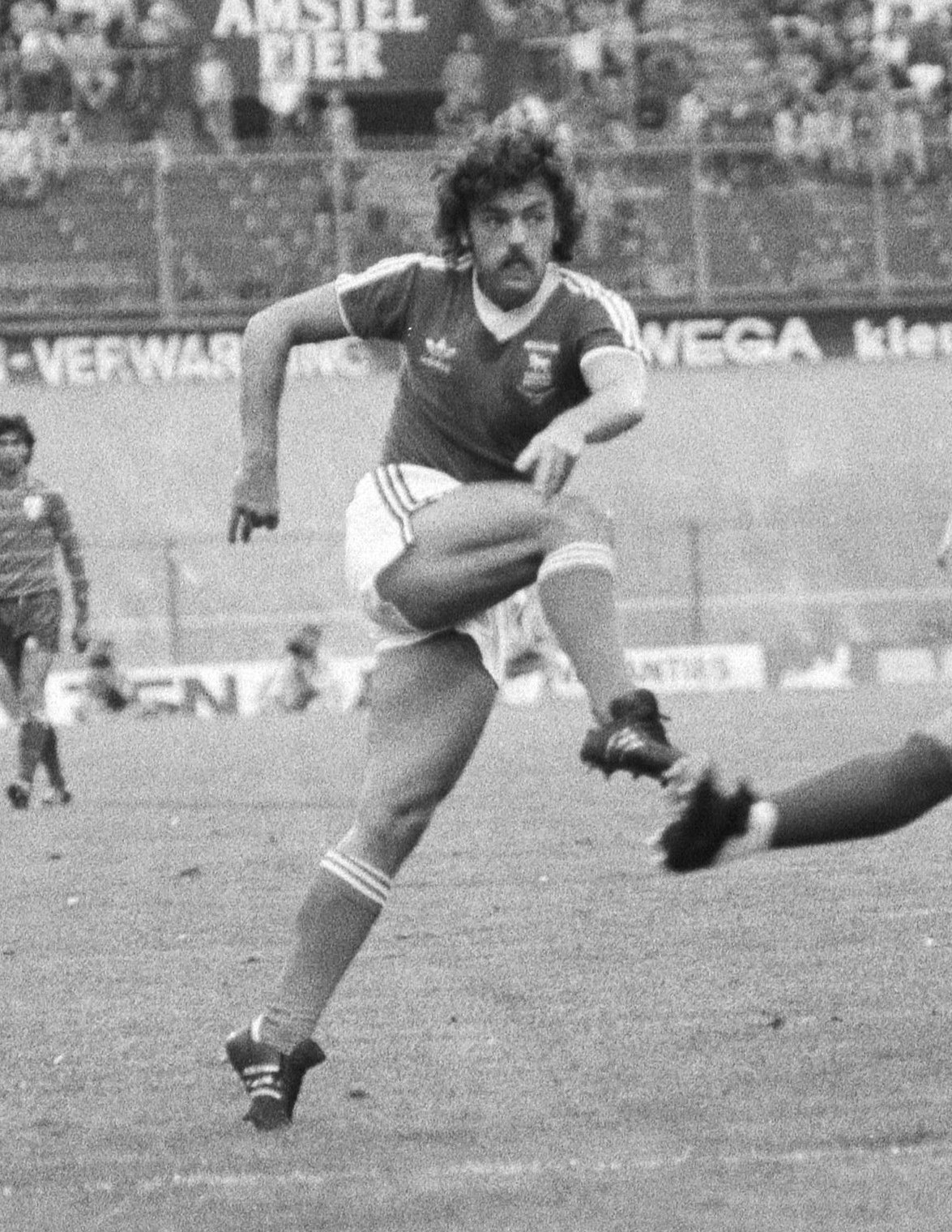
John Wark scored a record fourteen goals during Ipswich's 1980–81 UEFA Cup campaign.

Ipswich's Wark set a competition record by scoring 14 goals, equalling the long-standing scoring record in a European competition, set by José Altafini of A.C. Milan in the 1962–63 European Cup. The tally was later exceeded by Jürgen Klinsmann, who scored 15 in the 1995–96 UEFA Cup. A civic reception was held on 24 May 1981 where around 50,000 supporters were present at Ipswich Town Hall to see the team and the trophy. At the event, Robson announced that he would remain with Ipswich for the following season, having turned down Sunderland and opting not to apply for the Manchester United manager's position. He left Ipswich in 1982 to become the England national football team manager, leading England to the semi-finals of the 1990 FIFA World Cup. This was the best result for the nation since another former Ipswich manager, Alf Ramsey, led the country to World Cup victory in 1966.

Ipswich's defence of the UEFA Cup started in September 1981 against Alex Ferguson's Aberdeen. The first leg ended 1–1 with Thijssen scoring for Ipswich and John Hewitt equalising. The second leg at Pittodrie saw both Gordon Strachan and John Wark score from the penalty spot before Peter Weir settled the tie with two goals. Ipswich went out of the cup 4–2 on aggregate. After that, Ipswich's most successful campaign to date was when they made it to the third round of the 2001–02 UEFA Cup.

The season after the final, AZ '67 played in the European Cup where they were eliminated in the second round 5–4 on aggregate by Liverpool. Subsequently, AZ '67's most successful European football campaign was when they reached the semi-final of the 2004–05 UEFA Cup where they lost 4–3 on aggregate to the Portuguese club Sporting CP.

== See also ==
- 1981 European Cup final
- 1981 European Cup Winners' Cup final
- AZ Alkmaar in European football
- Ipswich Town F.C. in European football
- 1980–81 Ipswich Town F.C. season

== Bibliography ==
- Henderson, Mel (2010). 1980–81 – The Greatest Season in Ipswich Town's History. White Space Design. ISBN 978-0-9548737-2-1.
- Houseley, David; Houseley, Philip (2011). On a European Journey with Ipswich Town in Europe 1962–2002. Pilgrim Book Services Limited. ISBN 978-0-9532511-9-3.
- Souness, Graeme (19 October 2017). Graeme Souness – Football: My Life, My Passion. Headline. p. 61. ISBN 978-1-4722-4252-5.
