= 1980–81 Ipswich Town F.C. season =

English football team's season

Ipswich Town
1980–81 season
- Chairman: Patrick Cobbold
- Manager: Bobby Robson
- First Division: 2nd
- FA Cup: Semi-finals
- League Cup: Fourth round
- UEFA Cup: Winners
- Top goalscorer: League: John Wark (18); All: John Wark (36)
- Highest home attendance: 32,274 v Liverpool (13 December 1980)
- Lowest home attendance: 14,780 v Middlesbrough (2 September 1980)
- Average home league attendance: 24,619
Home colours

During the 1980–81 English football season, Ipswich Town F.C. competed in the Football League First Division. In one of the most successful seasons in the club's history, they finished as runners-up in the league championship, were semi-finalists in the FA Cup and won the UEFA Cup. In all, Ipswich played a total of 66 competitive games during the season, winning 37, drawing 13 and losing 16.

The season began with an unbeaten run in the club's opening 15 league matches, and by the middle of March they were strong title contenders with only two defeats in thirty-two. However, a 2–1 defeat against Manchester United triggered a slump which handed the initiative to eventual champions Aston Villa, although Ipswich did win at Villa Park during the run-in. Finishing as runners-up was the second-best finish Ipswich had achieved in their history, bettered only by the 1961–62 championship-winning season. The dip in form, losing seven of the last ten league games, was due in no small part to fixture congestion, as the club was progressing in cup competitions. The club lost in the fourth round of the League Cup to Birmingham but reached the semi-final of the FA Cup, losing in extra time to Manchester City. This was eclipsed by reaching – and then winning – the final of the UEFA Cup, where a 5–4 aggregate victory over Dutch side AZ Alkmaar clinched the club's first (and, to date, only) European trophy.

Top scorer for the season was 23-year-old John Wark, who scored 36 goals in all competitions, 14 of which came in the UEFA Cup tournament, including one in each leg of the final. This equalled José Altafini's record of 14 goals for Milan in the 1962–63 European Cup. Wark's goalscoring form saw him win the European Young Player of the Year and PFA Player of the Year awards. The Dutch midfielder Frans Thijssen was named Football Writers' Association Footballer of the Year.

== Previous season ==
Ipswich had ended the previous First Division campaign in third place. That season included an unbeaten run of 23 matches stretching from the beginning of December to the final Saturday of the League, when they lost at Manchester City. Ipswich exited the FA Cup at the quarter-final stage, losing 2–1 against Everton, and lost out to Coventry City in the second round of the League Cup. In European football, Ipswich were knocked out of the UEFA Cup in the second round, losing on away goals to Grasshoppers.

== Results ==
=== First Division ===
==== August to December ====
Ipswich started their league campaign with a 1–0 victory away at newly promoted Leicester City, with John Wark scoring the winning goal in the 88th minute. This was his first of a prolific season to come. Home wins against Brighton and Everton sandwiched a 2–2 draw at Stoke City, and left Ipswich unbeaten in the league and top of the table on goal difference at the end of August. Bobby Robson was awarded Football League First Division Manager of the Month for August. The club went through September undefeated, with victories against Aston Villa, Crystal Palace, Coventry City and Wolves, maintaining their position at the top of the division at the end of the month, four points ahead of Liverpool. Commitments in both the UEFA and League Cups meant Ipswich's league activity in October was restricted to four matches, drawing with Leeds United, Liverpool and Manchester United, and winning at Sunderland. Although Ipswich remained undefeated in the league by the end of October, Villa topped the table by two points, having played two more games.

November commenced with two draws, a goalless game at home against West Bromwich Albion and a six-goal match against Southampton. A shock 1–0 defeat against bottom club Brighton saw the end of Ipswich's unbeaten run of fourteen league games since the start of the season. Ipswich were without first-team regulars Paul Cooper, Thijssen, Alan Brazil and Kevin Beattie through injury, and Terry Butcher was suspended, having been sent off in the Southampton match. Burley succumbed to injury during the game; Robson remarked "I must admit, our resources are being stretched to the absolute limit". The defeat was followed by two wins, against Leicester City and Nottingham Forest. Ipswich ended the month third in the league, three points behind Aston Villa and two points behind Liverpool, but with three games in hand. Their performance was similar in December, commencing with two draws (against Manchester City and Liverpool), followed by a 5–3 defeat to Tottenham Hotspur. At 3–3, Ipswich's Eric Gates was sent off, seemingly for retaliating to Graham Roberts, and Tottenham took advantage to score twice in the final ten minutes through Steve Archibald and Osvaldo Ardiles, inflicting Ipswich's second league defeat of the season. Ipswich won 3–1 at Birmingham City before playing two matches in two days after Christmas, beating Norwich City 2–0 on Boxing Day before drawing 1–1 at Highbury against Arsenal the following day, courtesy of a Wark penalty, his 23rd goal of the season. The year ended with Ipswich in third place in the league, still behind Liverpool and Villa, but by only a single point and with two games in hand.

==== January to May ====
The new year started with two home victories, a 2–0 win against Nottingham Forest and, on what was Robson's twelfth anniversary as Ipswich manager, a 5–1 defeat of Birmingham City, which took Ipswich back to the top of the league for the first time since October. A goalless draw at Everton was then followed by a 4–0 win at Portman Road against Stoke City, with Ipswich's dominance leading Stoke manager Alan Durban to comment: "I've never seen a team with such confidence in their eyes". Ipswich ended the month back on top of the league table, tied on points with Aston Villa and four points clear of Liverpool, and with a game in hand on both. Ipswich went through February with a 100% record, with three home wins over Crystal Palace, Middlesbrough and Wolverhampton Wanderers, and an away win against Coventry City. This consolidated the club's position at the top of the league by the end of the month, two points ahead of Villa and eight ahead of Liverpool, and earned Robson another Manager of the Month award. Two home wins (against Tottenham and Sunderland) and two away losses (against Manchester United and Leeds United) in March for Ipswich saw the gap at the top of the table ahead of Aston Villa reduce to a single point by the end of March, yet Robson was awarded his third Manager of the Month award. Having lost just two league games between August and February, Ipswich's form had started to dip as a result of fixture congestion with them still playing in three competitions.

Ipswich's season worsened in April, losing to West Bromwich Albion, Arsenal and Norwich, and securing just four points with wins against Manchester City and Aston Villa. Ipswich ended April second in the league, four points behind Villa with a game in hand, but with only two games of the season remaining. Ipswich needed to win both games to remain in the title chase. They led 1–0 at half-time against Middlesbrough at Ayresome Park, but two goals from Yugoslavian international striker Boško Janković condemned Ipswich to their sixth defeat in nine games. They went on to lose the last game against Southampton, and ended the season in second place, four points behind Aston Villa and three points ahead of Arsenal who won seven of their final eight matches.

==== Results summary ====
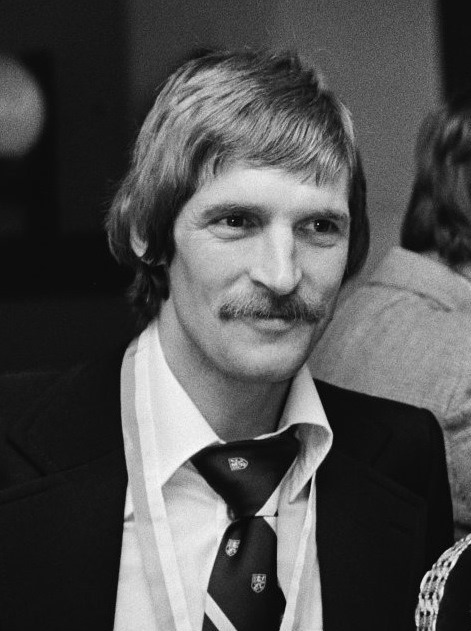
Frans Thijssen scored three league goals during Ipswich's 1980–81 season.

Date	Opponents	H/A	Result F–A	Scorers	Attendance
16 August 1980	Leicester City	A	1–0	Wark	21,640
19 August 1980	Brighton & Hove Albion	H	2–0	Wark, Gates	21,568
23 August 1980	Stoke City	A	2–2	Brazil, Gates	10,722
30 August 1980	Everton	H	4–0	Brazil, Wark, Butcher, Mariner	20,879
6 September 1980	Aston Villa	H	1–0	Thijssen	23,192
13 September 1980	Crystal Palace	A	2–1	Wark, Gates	24,282
20 September 1980	Coventry City	H	2–0	Wark 2	20,507
27 September 1980	Wolverhampton Wanderers	A	2–0	Brazil, Mariner	18,503
4 October 1980	Leeds United	H	1–1	Wark	24,087
11 October 1980	Liverpool	A	1–1	Thijssen	48,084
18 October 1980	Manchester United	H	1–1	Mariner	28,451
25 October 1980	Sunderland	A	2–0	Mühren, Brazil	32,368
1 November 1980	West Bromwich Albion	H	0–0		23,043
8 November 1980	Southampton	A	3–3	Gates, Wark, Mariner	21,261
11 November 1980	Brighton & Hove Albion	A	0–1		17,055
15 November 1980	Leicester City	H	3–1	Gates, Williams (og), d'Avray	19,852
22 November 1980	Nottingham Forest	A	2–1	Brazil, Wark (pen)	24,423
6 December 1980	Manchester City	A	1–1	Mühren	35,215
13 December 1980	Liverpool	H	1–1	Brazil	32,274
17 December 1980	Tottenham Hotspur	A	3–5	Mariner 2, Gates	22,741
20 December 1980	Birmingham City	A	3–1	Mariner, Wark, Brazil	16,161
26 December 1980	Norwich City	H	2–0	Brazil, Wark	27,890
27 December 1980	Arsenal	A	1–1	Wark (pen)	42,818
10 January 1981	Nottingham Forest	H	2–0	Mariner, Mühren	25,701
13 January 1981	Birmingham City	H	5–1	Wark, Butcher, Mariner, Mühren, Brazil	21,158
17 January 1981	Everton	A	0–0		25,516
31 January 1981	Stoke City	H	4–0	Wark (pen), Brazil 2, Gates	23,843
7 February 1981	Crystal Palace	H	3–2	Mariner, Wark (pen), Gilbert (og)	25,036
17 February 1981	Middlesbrough	H	1–0	Brazil	24,781
21 February 1981	Wolverhampton Wanderers	H	3–1	Wark, Gates, Beattie	24,218
28 February 1981	Coventry City	A	4–0	Brazil, Gates, McCall, Osman	17,557
14 March 1981	Tottenham Hotspur	H	3–0	Gates, Wark (pen), Brazil	32,052
21 March 1981	Manchester United	A	1–2	Butcher	46,685
28 March 1981	Sunderland	H	4–1	Mühren, Mariner 2, Thijssen	25,450
31 March 1981	Leeds United	A	0–3		26,462
4 April 1981	West Bromwich Albion	A	1–3	Brazil	22,216
14 April 1981	Aston Villa	A	2–1	Brazil, Gates	47,495
18 April 1981	Arsenal	H	0–2		30,935
20 April 1981	Norwich City	A	0–1		26,083
25 April 1981	Manchester City	H	1–0	Butcher	22,684
2 May 1981	Middlesbrough	A	1–2	Mariner	15,503
13 May 1981	Southampton	H	2–3	Brazil, Wark	19,504

==== League table summary ====
Pos	Team	Pld	HW	HD	HL	HGF	HGA	AW	AD	AL	AGF	AGA	GD	Pts	Qualification or relegation
1	Aston Villa (C)	42	16	3	2	40	13	10	5	6	32	27	+32	60	Qualified for the 1981–82 European Cup first round
2	Ipswich Town	42	15	4	2	45	14	8	6	7	32	29	+34	56	Qualified for the 1981–82 UEFA Cup first round
3	Arsenal	42	13	8	0	36	17	6	7	8	25	28	+16	53	Qualified for the 1981–82 UEFA Cup first round
4	West Bromwich Albion	42	15	4	2	40	15	5	8	8	20	27	+18	52	Qualified for the 1981–82 UEFA Cup first round
5	Liverpool	42	13	5	3	38	15	4	12	5	24	27	+20	51	Qualified for the 1981–82 European Cup first round (Note: Liverpool won the European Cup this year, and thus qualified for the following season's competition as defending champions. They also won the League Cup this year.)
6	Southampton	42	15	4	2	47	22	5	6	10	29	34	+20	50	Qualified for the 1981–82 UEFA Cup first round

Source: 11v11.com
(C) Champion

=== League Cup ===
Ipswich commenced the 1980–81 Football League Cup campaign in the second round, where they were drawn against Middlesbrough. They lost the first leg 3–1 away from home, but secured a second leg 3–0 win courtesy of a Paul Mariner brace and a goal from Russell Osman. Although the match was covered for television by both the BBC and Anglia Television, footage was not screened because the Middlesbrough shirts were sponsored by a car company, contrary to the broadcasting companies' rules. In the third round, against local rivals Norwich City, another Osman goal ensured a 1–1 draw at Portman Road. Ipswich progressed to the fourth round following a 3–1 victory at Carrow Road. Mariner put Ipswich ahead, but Tony Powell's first goal in two years drew the scores level. Mariner's second strike and a goal from Mühren in a three-minute spell secured the victory for Ipswich. They then faced Birmingham City at St Andrew's but went into the tie without regulars Mariner, Thijssen, Beattie and O'Callaghan, all through injury. Ipswich were knocked out, losing 2–1 despite taking the lead with a penalty from Wark. It was their first overall domestic loss of the season.

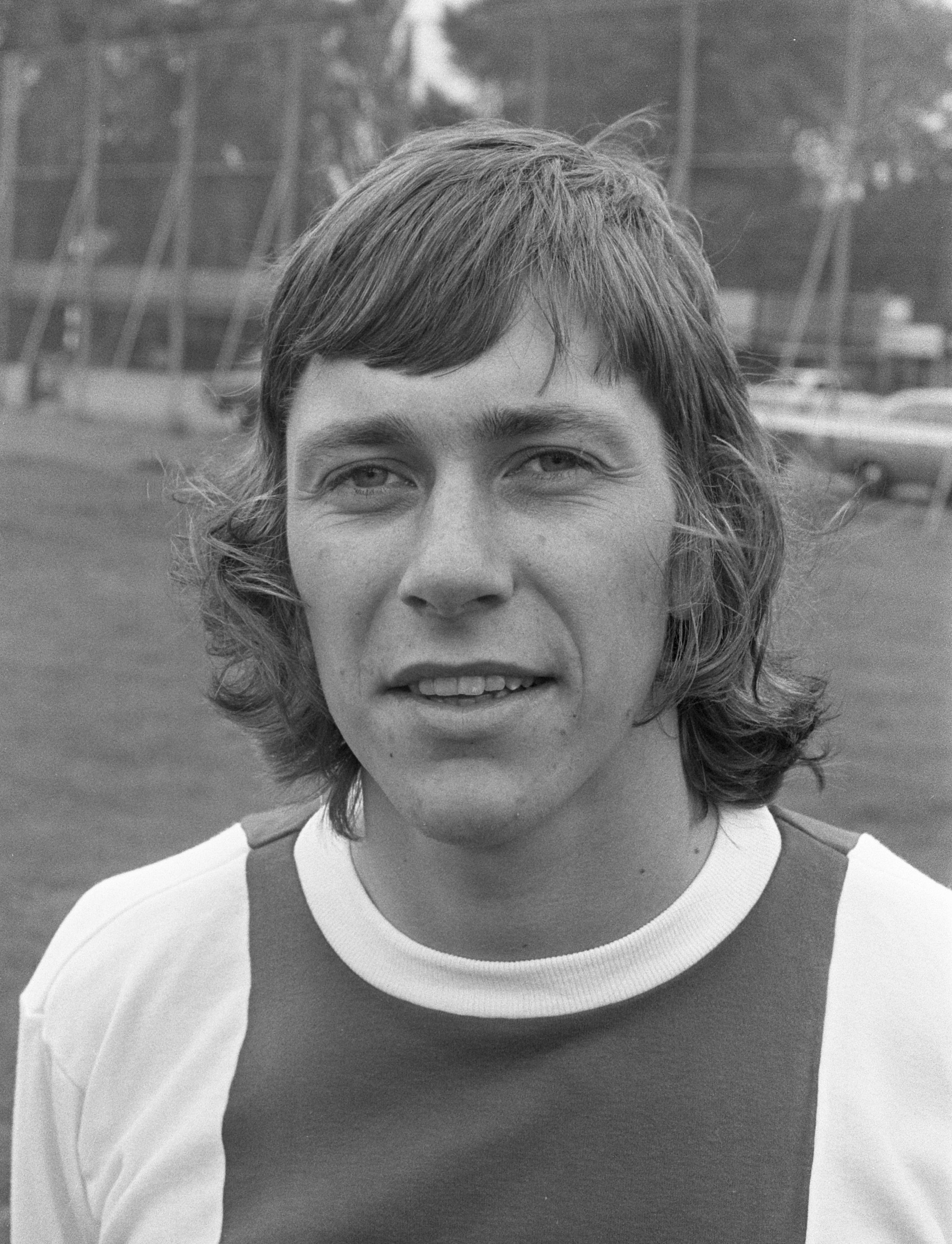
Arnold Mühren scored in the third round replay of the League Cup against Norwich City.

Date	Round	Opponents	H/A	Result F–A	Scorers	Attendance
26 August 1980	Round 2 First leg	Middlesbrough	A	1–3	Wark	14,459
2 September 1980	Round 2 Second leg	Middlesbrough	H	3–0	Osman, Mariner 2	14,780
23 September 1980	Round 3	Norwich City	H	1–1	Osman	26,462
8 October 1980	Round 3 Replay	Norwich City	A	3–1	Mariner 2, Mühren	24,523
28 October 1980	Round 4	Birmingham City	A	1–2	Wark (pen)	18,968

=== FA Cup ===
Ipswich's first appearance in the 1980–81 FA Cup was in the third round, against Aston Villa at Portman Road. A goal from Paul Mariner was sufficient to see the team progress to a fourth round tie with Second Division team Shrewsbury Town at Gay Meadow. The match ended in a goalless draw, forcing a replay and Robson declared Shrewsbury to have been unlucky: "if we play like that again we won't win the cup or the league title". Ipswich won the replay 3–0 with two goals from Eric Gates and John Wark scoring his 25th goal in all competitions that season.

A home draw in the fifth round against Charlton Athletic ended in a 2–0 victory to Ipswich courtesy of strikes from Mariner and Wark. Ipswich were drawn to play away against Brian Clough's Nottingham Forest in the quarter finals. In a match described by ESPN as "a classic FA Cup tie", the visitors took a two-goal lead through a Mariner strike and an own goal from Viv Anderson, before Forest fought back to take a 3–2 lead after goals from Trevor Francis, Colin Walsh and John Robertson (from the penalty spot). Thijssen then scored with six minutes remaining to take the tie to a replay. The replay, held three days later at Portman Road, was decided by a single goal from Mühren, with Robson describing his team's effort as "superhuman" while Clough, whose team dominated the first half, said: "I am still not sure they are a better team than us". The semi-final against Manchester City was played at Villa Park as a neutral venue. Described as "one of the celebrated strikes in the club's history", Paul Power's extra time free kick settled the match in City's favour. It was also to be the last game for the club for the injury-struck Beattie who broke his arm during the match. Beattie recalled "I collided with Dave Bennett during an aerial challenge. I won the ball fairly easily but he actually headed my arm ... the arm was bent out of shape and I was in agony".

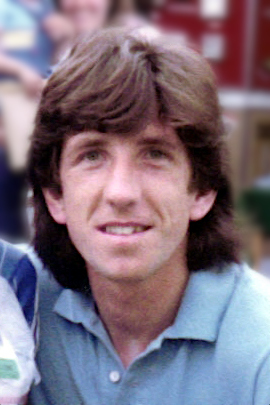
Paul Mariner scored three times during Ipswich's FA Cup run.

Date	Round	Opponents	H/A	Result F–A	Scorers	Attendance
3 January 1981	Round 3	Aston Villa	H	1–0	Mariner 12'	27,721
24 January 1981	Round 4	Shrewsbury Town	A	0–0		18,000
27 January 1981	Round 4 Replay	Shrewsbury Town	H	3–0	Gates 2, Wark	27,543
14 February 1981	Round 5	Charlton Athletic	H	2–0	Wark, Mariner	30,221
7 March 1981	Round 6	Nottingham Forest	A	3–3	Mariner, Anderson (og), Thijssen	34,796
10 March 1981	Round 6 Replay	Nottingham Forest	H	1–0	Mühren	31,060
11 April 1981	Semi-final	Manchester City	N	0–1		46,537

=== UEFA Cup ===
Ipswich's European campaign commenced in the first round of the UEFA Cup against Greek team Aris Salonika. The first leg, at Portman Road, was an ill-disciplined match which saw Aris' Giorgos Foiros sent off after a second yellow card towards the end of the first half. Ipswich were awarded three penalties, all of which were converted by John Wark, who also scored a fourth from open play. Aris also scored from the spot through Theodoros Pallas in what would be a consolation goal in a 5–1 win for Ipswich, described as a "sparkling" victory by the Belfast Telegraph. Two weeks later, Aris won 3–1 in the return leg, taking an early 2–0 lead before Gates pulled one back for Ipswich. Although Aris scored a third midway through the second half, Ipswich progressed to the next round 6–4 on aggregate, where they faced Bohemians of Prague. A 3–0 home win saw Wark on target twice more, who was substituted off with a tendon injury, to be replaced by Kevin Beattie who scored a third for Ipswich with a free kick, described in The Times as a "thunderbolt". The goal would prove to be pivotal as Ipswich, without regular goalkeeper Paul Cooper, midfielder Thijssen and striker Mariner, all through injury, lost the away leg 2–0 with goals from Antonín Panenka and Tibor Mičinec, but qualified for the third round 3–2 on aggregate. Three weeks later, Ipswich faced Widzew Łódź from Poland, who had defeated Manchester United and Juventus in previous rounds, at Portman Road. Wark once again found the net, scoring a hat-trick with goals from Alan Brazil and Paul Mariner completing a comprehensive 5–0 victory, the only negative being a trip to hospital for Mick Mills for 15 stitches in a cut to his shin. On a frozen pitch which many observers considered to be dangerous, Widzew Łódź won the away leg 1–0, with Marek Pięta scoring for the hosts but went out 5–1 on aggregate. The lead from the first leg allowed Robson to withdraw Mariner and Mühren, as he said that he was prioritising Ipswich's league challenge.

After a three-month break, Ipswich faced French team AS Saint-Étienne in the quarter-finals in March 1981, the first leg being held in the Stade Geoffroy-Guichard. Dutch player Johnny Rep put the home team in the lead after 16 minutes, but a brace from Mariner and goals from Arnold Mühren and John Wark ensured Ipswich took a 4–1 lead into the second leg. The victory against the French team has been described as one of the greatest performances in Ipswich's history, with Robson noting: "we have demolished a good side with one of the best victories anyone has achieved in Europe in the past 10 years". Ipswich won the game at Portman Road 3–1 with goals from Terry Butcher, Mariner and another penalty from Wark, while Saint-Étienne's consolation goal came from Jacques Zimako. Winning the tie 7–2 on aggregate, Ipswich progressed to the semi-finals where they met German side 1. FC Köln. Both legs finished 1–0 to Ipswich, Wark scoring again in the home leg, his 12th goal of the European campaign, with Butcher heading in a Thijssen free kick in Cologne. The 2–0 aggregate victory ensured that Ipswich qualified for their first (and as of 2020, their only) European cup final, where they would face Dutch team AZ Alkmaar.

The first leg of the 1981 UEFA Cup final took place at Portman Road on 6 May 1981. Ipswich took the lead through Wark who scored from the penalty spot midway through the first half. It was Wark's 13th goal of the European campaign and ensured that he had scored in every round of the competition. The lead was doubled a minute into the second half, following a header from Dutchman Frans Thijssen. A third goal for Ipswich, this time from Paul Mariner, saw the English team win the game and take a 3–0 lead into the second leg at the Olympic Stadium in Amsterdam. Thijssen scored four minutes into the second leg, giving Ipswich a 4–0 aggregate lead, but Austrian striker Kurt Welzl pulled one back for AZ minutes later. Playing with two central defenders, the rest of the AZ team attacked, and Johnny Metgod and Pier Tol scored before half-time, either side of a Wark goal, to take the aggregate to 5–3. Jos Jonker scored AZ's fourth of the day with 16 minutes to go, but Ipswich held on to win 5–4 on aggregate, with their goalkeeper Cooper named as man of the match. As Mühren, one of the two Dutchmen playing for Ipswich, later recalled, "most teams would have given up, but AZ suddenly had wings ... AZ seemed possessed that night ... we really had to give all we had to reach the end, by the skin of our teeth – relieved and happy".

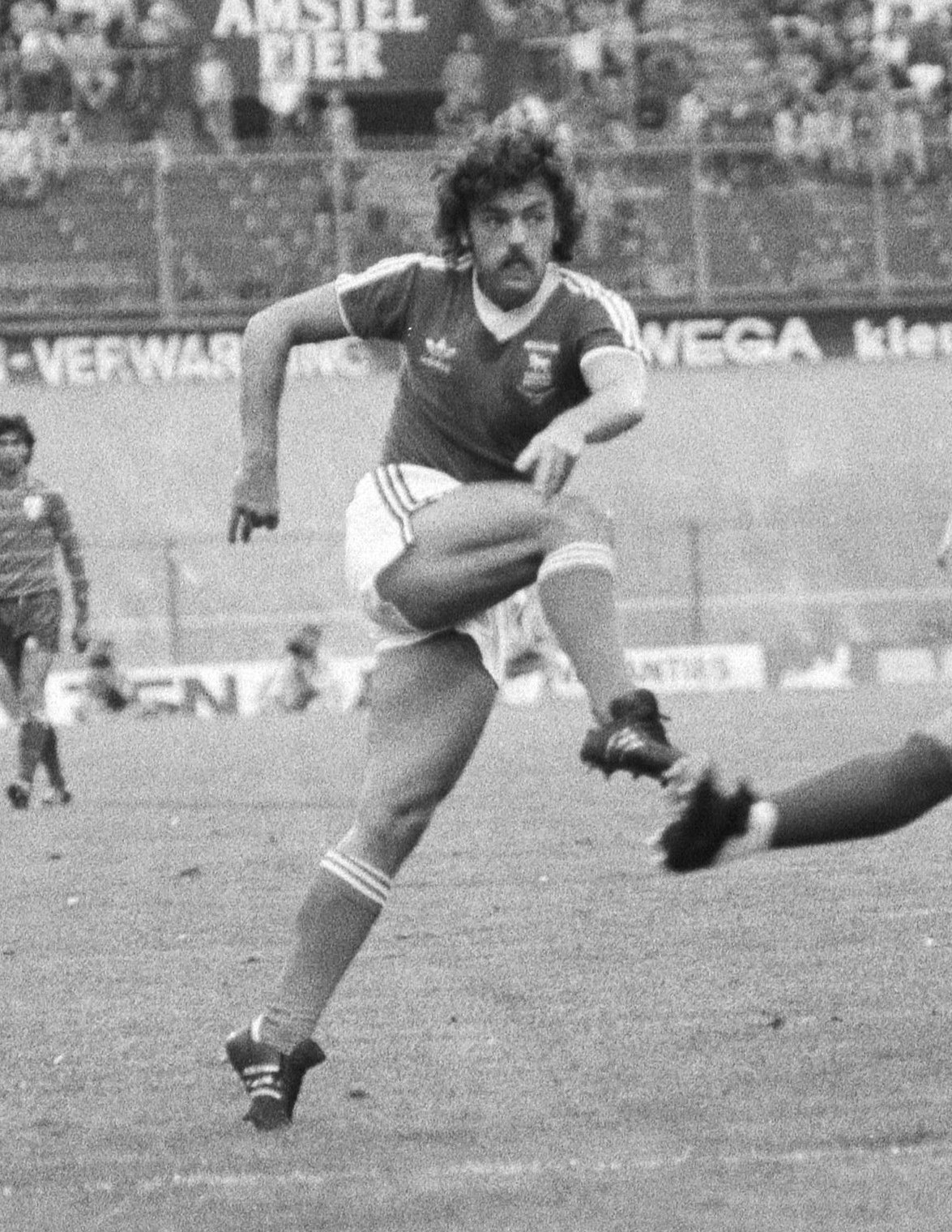
John Wark scored 14 goals during Ipswich's UEFA Cup campaign.

Date	Round	Opponents	H/A	Result F–A	Scorers	Attendance
17 September 1980	Round 1 First leg	Aris Salonika	H	5–1	Wark 4 (3 pens), Mariner	20,842
1 October 1980	Round 1 Second leg	Aris Salonika	A	1–3	Gates	23,306
22 October 1980	Round 2 First leg	Bohemians Prague	H	3–0	Wark 2, Beattie	17,163
5 November 1980	Round 2 Second leg	Bohemians Prague	A	0–2		13,000
26 November 1980	Round 3 First leg	Widzew Łódź	H	5–0	Wark 3, Brazil, Mariner	20,445
10 December 1980	Round 3 Second leg	Widzew Łódź	A	0–1		12,000
4 March 1981	Quarter-final; First leg	Saint-Étienne	A	4–1	Mariner 2, Mühren, Wark	36,919
18 March 1981	Quarter-final; Second leg	Saint-Étienne	H	3–1	Butcher, Wark (pen), Mariner	30,151
8 April 1981	Semi-final; First leg	FC Cologne	H	1–0	Wark	24,780
22 April 1981	Semi-final; Second leg	FC Cologne	A	1–0	Butcher	49,476
6 May 1981	Final; First leg	AZ Alkmaar	H	3–0	Wark (pen), Thijssen, Mariner	27,532
20 May 1981	Final; Second leg	AZ Alkmaar	A	2–4	Thijssen, Wark	22,291

== Squad statistics ==
Russell Osman was the only player to be ever-present throughout the season, appearing in all 66 matches.

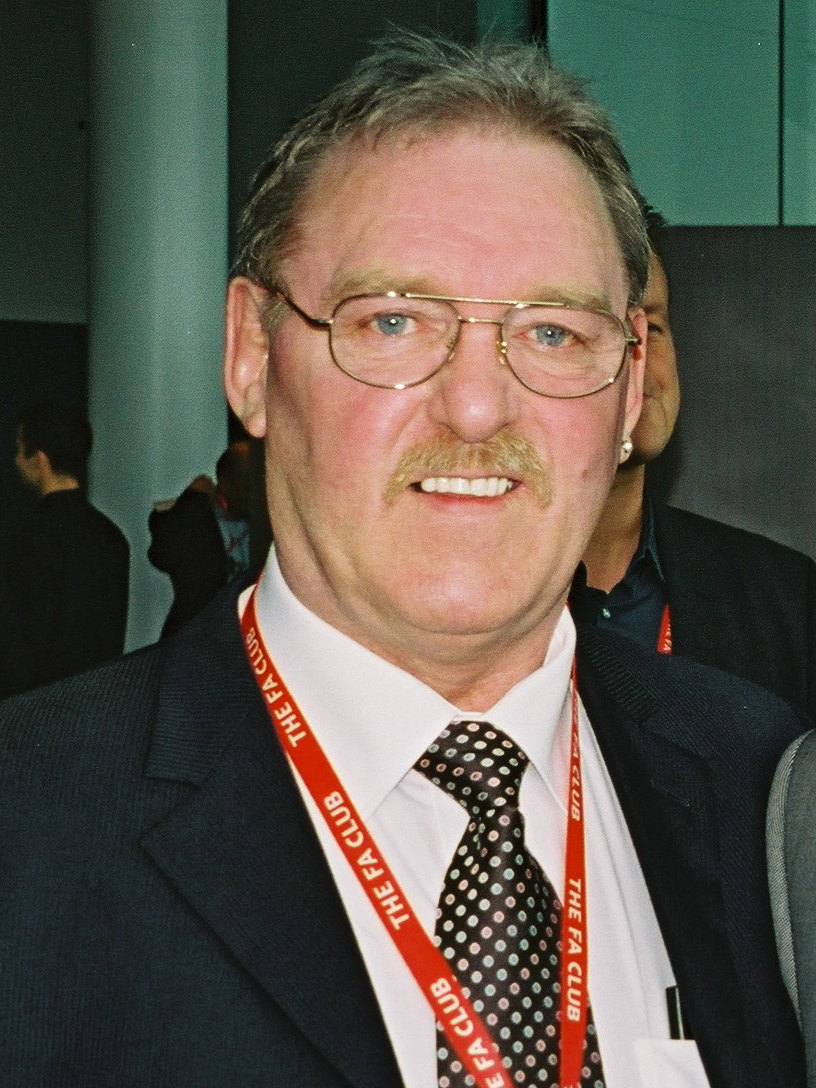
The 1980–81 season was Kevin Beattie's last; he broke his arm in the semi-final of the FA Cup and made no further appearances for the club.

Pos.	Name	Nationality	League		League Cup		FA Cup		Europe		Total	
Pos.	Name	Nationality	Apps	Goals	Apps	Goals	Apps	Goals	Apps	Goals	Apps	Goals
GK	Paul Cooper	ENG	38	0	5	0	7	0	11	0	61	0
GK	Laurie Sivell	ENG	4	0	0	0	1	0	0	0	5	0
DF	Kevin Beattie	ENG	7	1	0	0	2	0	2 (6)	1	11 (6)	2
DF	George Burley	SCO	23	0	4	0	2	0	5	0	34	0
DF	Terry Butcher	ENG	40	4	5	0	7	0	12	2	64	6
DF	Allan Hunter	NIR	1	0	0	0	0	0	0	0	1	0
MF	Steve McCall	ENG	30 (1)	1	2	0	4 (1)	0	9 (1)	0	45 (3)	1
DF	Mick Mills	ENG	33	0	5	0	6	0	10	0	54	0
DF	Russell Osman	ENG	42	1	5	2	7	0	12	0	66	3
DF	Tommy Parkin	ENG	2 (2)	0	0	0	0	0	0	0	2 (2)	0
DF	Kevin Steggles	ENG	6	0	0	0	0	0	2	0	8	0
MF	Arnold Mühren	NED	41	5	5	1	7	1	12	1	65	8
MF	Kevin O'Callaghan	IRL	11 (13)	0	1 (1)	0	0 (4)	0	0 (5)	0	12 (23)	0
MF	Roger Osborne	ENG	1	0	0	0	0	0	0	0	1	0
MF	Frans Thijssen	NED	31	3	4	0	7	1	10	2	52	6
MF	John Wark	SCO	40	18	5	2	7	2	12	14	64	36
FW	Alan Brazil	SCO	35	17	4	0	7	0	12	1	58	18
FW	Mich d'Avray	ENG	1 (3)	1	1	0	0	0	0 (1)	0	2 (4)	1
FW	Eric Gates	ENG	37	11	5	0	7	2	11	1	60	14
FW	Paul Mariner	ENG	36	13	4	4	7	3	11	6	58	26
FW	Robin Turner	ENG	3 (1)	0	0	0	0	0	0 (1)	0	3 (2)	0

== Records and awards ==
Robson and five different players won major awards for their performances during the season; a further two players were shortlisted for accolades. Leading the way was Wark, who set a UEFA Cup record by scoring 14 goals, including two in the final. This equalled the then long-standing scoring record in a European competition, set by José Altafini of A.C. Milan in the 1962–63 European Cup. (Note: The tally was exceeded by Jürgen Klinsmann, who scored 15 in the 1995–96 UEFA Cup.) Wark's personal accolades that year included winning the European Young Player of the Year, and, voted by his fellow professionals in England, the PFA Player of the Year award. He ended the 1980–81 season with 36 goals.

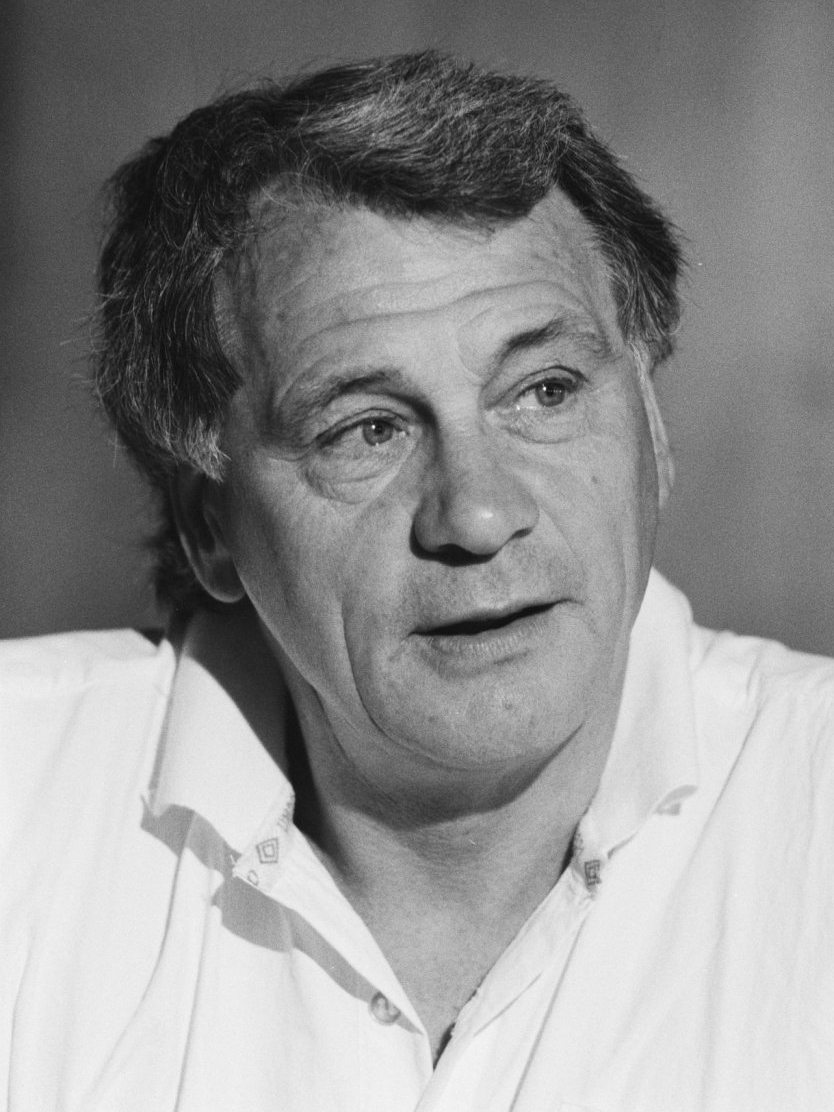
Bobby Robson was named Bell's Whisky Manager of the Month three times throughout the 1980–81 season.

Award	Recipient	Notes	Ref(s)
Manager of the Month (3)	(England) Bobby Robson	Robson was named Bell's Whisky Manager of the Month in August 1980, February 1981 and March 1981.	
Player of the Year	(England) Paul Cooper	Cooper and his defence kept 27 clean sheets during the season.	
PFA First Division Team of the Year	(England) Russell Osman		
PFA First Division Team of the Year	(Netherlands) Frans Thijssen		
PFA First Division Team of the Year	(Scotland) John Wark		
PFA First Division Team of the Year	(England) Paul Mariner		
Football Writers' Association Footballer of the Year	(Netherlands) Frans Thijssen	Four Ipswich players were in the top six: Mick Mills was runner-up, John Wark third, and Arnold Mühren sixth.	
PFA Players' Player of the Year	(Scotland) John Wark	Ipswich players dominated the top three, with Frans Thijssen second and Paul Mariner third.	
Young European Player of the Year	(Scotland) John Wark		
France Football European Team of the Year	(England) Ipswich Town		
