= AZ Alkmaar in European football =

Overview of the AZ Alkmaar's history in European football

AZ in European football
- Club: AZ Alkmaar
- Seasons played: 25
- Most appearances: Yukinari Sugawara (49)
- Top scorer: Kees Kist (18)
- First entry: 1977–78 UEFA Cup
- Latest entry: 2026–27 UEFA Europa League

AZ Alkmaar, formerly named AZ '67 between their formation in 1967 and 1986, played their very first official match in competitive European football on 14 September 1977. This was a UEFA Cup first round game against FA Red Boys Differdange of Luxembourg. The match ended in an 11–1 blowout home victory for AZ.

Today, AZ can participate in three UEFA tournaments: the UEFA Champions League, UEFA Europa League, and UEFA Conference League. Qualification is achieved through Eredivisie performance, playoffs, KNVB Cup victory, or success in European tournaments. Historically, AZ have qualified 23 times. With extensive European experience, AZ ranks fourth among Dutch clubs, following Ajax, PSV, and Feyenoord. They faced internationally renowned clubs like Barcelona, Liverpool, Inter Milan, Benfica, and Manchester United. In 1981, AZ reached the final of the 1980–81 UEFA Cup, which saw them lose 5–4 on aggregate over two legs to Ipswich Town.

AZ held a record of 32 undefeated home matches in European competitions until it was broken by Everton in the 2007–08 UEFA Cup group stage.

== History ==
=== Early years and historic final (1977–1982) ===
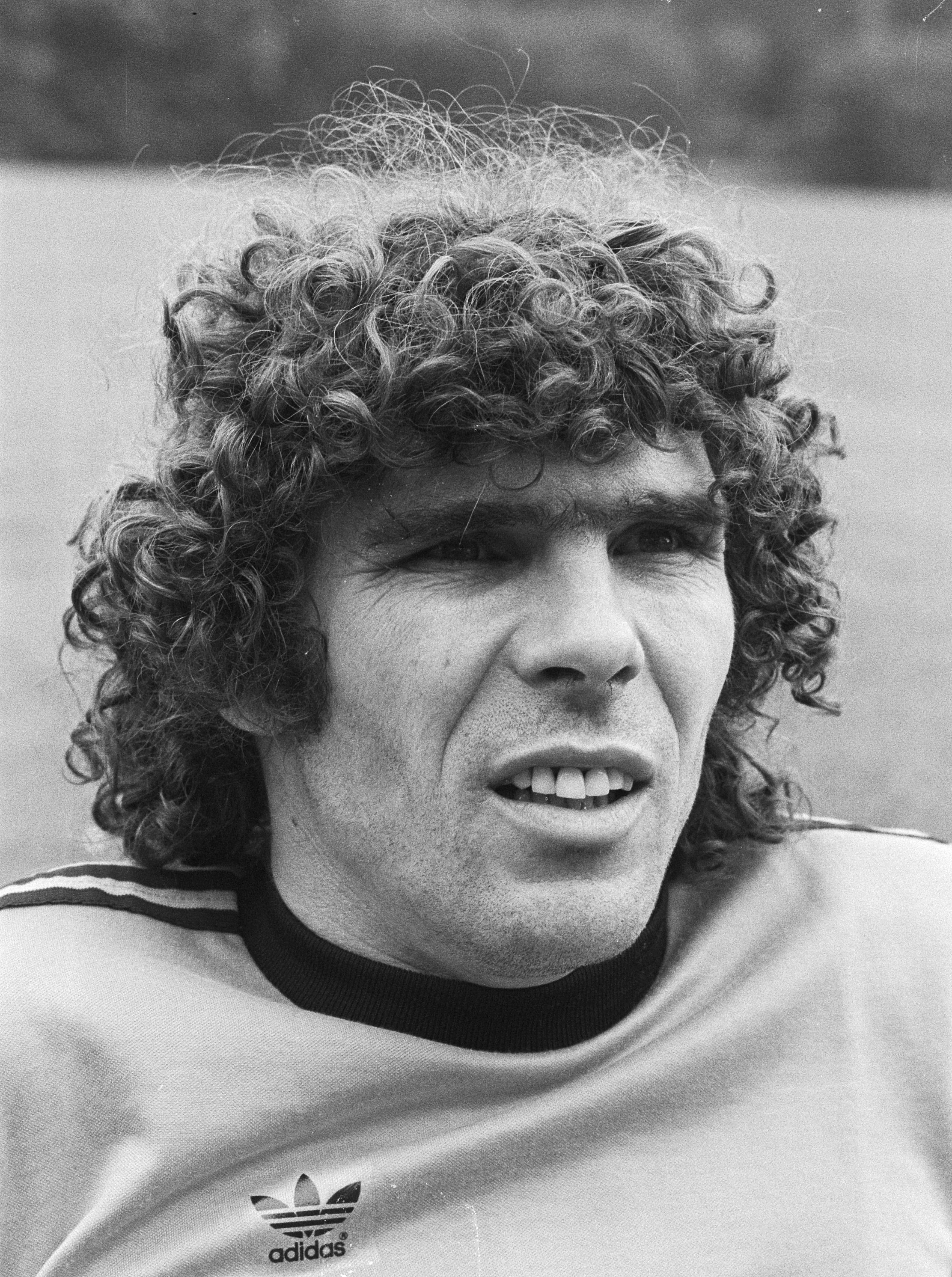
Willem van Hanegem scored AZ's first ever European goal in a 11–1 win against FA Red Boys Differdange in 1977

After finishing third in the previous season of the Eredivisie, AZ first competed in European football competition in 1977–78. In the first round of the UEFA Cup, AZ immediately secured two historic victories against FA Red Boys Differdange of Luxembourg. At home at the Alkmaarderhout, they secured their biggest-ever win in European competitions with an impressive 11–1 triumph (also marking their largest victory in any official match). Additionally, their 5–0 victory in the away leg remains unbeaten in European contests. Their first European journey came to a halt in the second round when they faced Johan Cruyff and Johan Neeskens' Barcelona. The first leg at home ended in a 1–1 draw, and the same result was repeated at Camp Nou. Even after extra time, the score remained unchanged, forcing a penalty shootout. Barcelona excelled in their penalty kicks, converting all five, while AZ faltered when Kristen Nygaard missed the third penalty in the series, resulting in a 5–4 loss.

The following season, AZ qualified for the 1978–79 European Cup Winners' Cup after winning the 1977–78 KNVB Cup. This marked AZ's shortest European campaign until the 2012–13 season as Ipswich Town proved to be the stronger side over two legs, with final scores of 0–0 and 2–0.

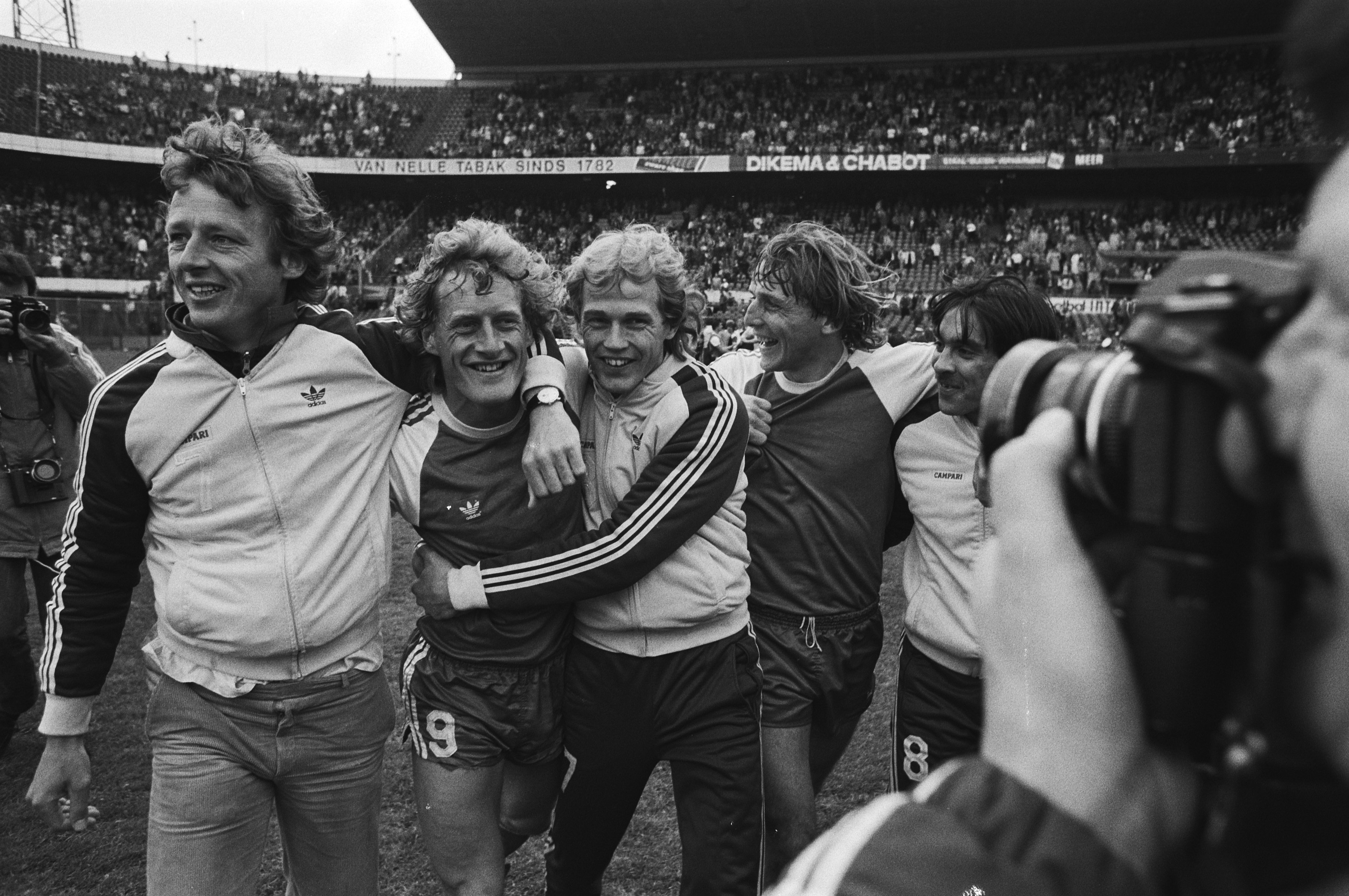
AZ celebrated their first-ever Eredivisie title with a 5–1 away victory over Feyenoord on 3 May 1981. This win secured their spot in the 1981–82 European Cup. The photo features left-back Hugo Hovenkamp (left, in tracksuit) and forward Kees Kist (centre, number 9).

The 1980–81 season was historic for AZ as they secured their first-ever Eredivisie title, won the KNVB Cup, and reached the UEFA Cup final. Despite their remarkable success in the domestic league, their UEFA Cup journey ended with a narrow 5–4 aggregate loss to Ipswich Town in the final. Notably, this defeat came just three days after celebrating their inaugural league championship.

As Eredivisie champions in the 1980–81 season, AZ qualified for the prestigious European Cup. In the first round, they faced Start, the Norwegian champions, and secured a 4–1 victory. However, they faced a formidable challenge in Liverpool in the second round. Despite a valiant effort, AZ narrowly missed a quarter-final spot, drawing 2–2 and losing 3–2, making it the third time in a row that an English club halted their European campaign.

Following their KNVB Cup victory in 1982, AZ earned their second opportunity to participate in the European Cup Winners' Cup. In the first round, they narrowly defeated Limerick United, the FAI Cup winners, over two legs, with a 2–1 aggregate score. Their journey ended in the second round, where they faced Inter Milan. Although AZ managed a 1–0 victory at home, they lost the return leg 2–0, concluding their European Cup Winners' Cup adventure.

=== A new era (2004–2008) ===
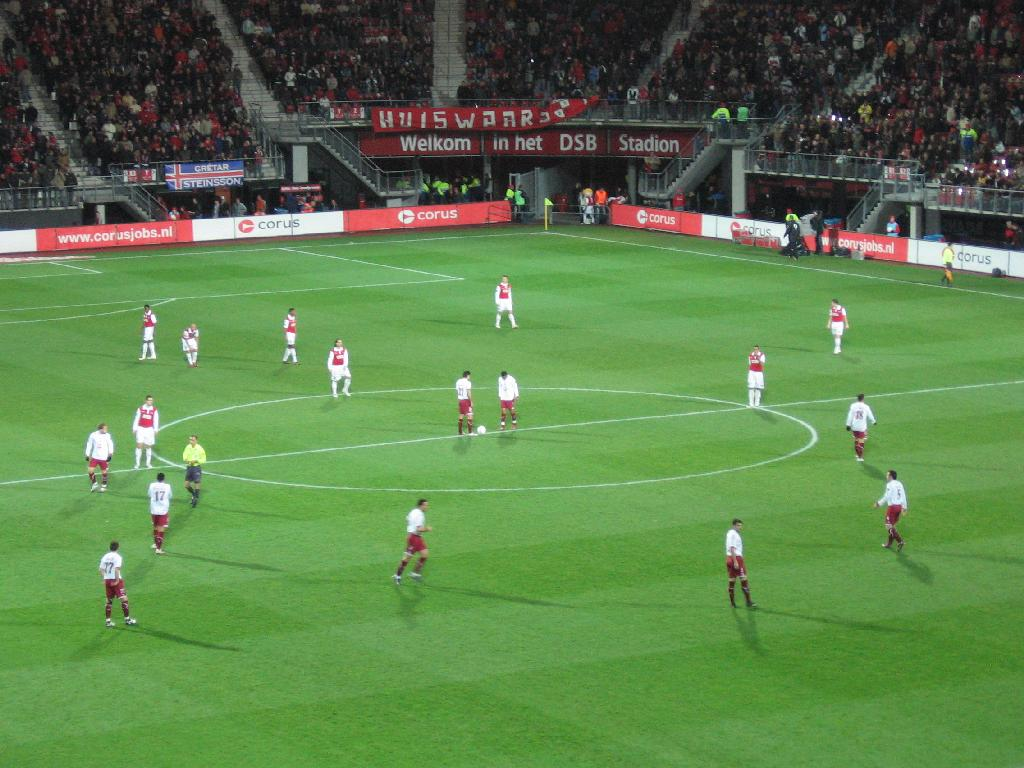
Kick-off between AZ and AEL in 2007.

AZ ended a 22-year hiatus from European competition with a notable 2004–05 UEFA Cup journey. Their campaign began with a 3–2 away win against PAOK, inciting unrest among the home crowd. Despite a 0–1 deficit in the return leg, AZ triumphed 2–1. Under head coach Co Adriaanse, AZ's attacking flair surprised opponents like Auxerre, Rangers, and Villarreal. Progressing to the semis, they were narrowly defeated by Sporting CP, who scored in injury time.

The subsequent season saw a new manager, Louis van Gaal, lead AZ to the UEFA Cup's round of 32. However, they were eliminated by Real Betis after a 3–2 aggregate defeat. Betis won 2–0 in Spain, and AZ could only manage a 2–0 win at home, resulting in a 2–1 aggregate defeat after extra time. This match marked AZ's last European game in Alkmaarderhout, where they had never lost a European match.

In the 2006–07 season, they continued impressively, defeating Sevilla away in the group stage and advancing through knockouts against Fenerbahçe and Newcastle United. Yet, Werder Bremen halted their progress in the quarter-finals following a 4–1 away loss at Weserstadion after a Miroslav Klose brace.

After narrowly missing out on the Eredivisie title in 2007, AZ's 2007–08 campaign failed to meet expectations after a turbulent domestic season. Despite a win against Paços de Ferreira, AZ struggled in the group stage, suffering their first home defeat in European competition against Everton after a record 32 unbeaten games, and failing to advance further.

=== Champions League and European establishment (2009–2014) ===
==== 2009–10 UEFA Champions League ====
In 2009, AZ earned a spot in the UEFA Champions League after securing the national championship—their first ever appearance in the group stage of the tournament. Their opponents included Arsenal, Olympiacos, and Standard Liège. Financially, the Champions League windfall was vital, particularly because just before their matches against Arsenal, their main sponsor, DSB Bank, went bankrupt, leaving AZ with sudden high debts. The earnings from these matches were crucial in managing this unforeseen financial burden.

While Arsenal dominated the group, AZ faced defeats against Olympiacos and Standard, culminating in six winless matches and elimination. Notably, the matches against Standard were particularly frustrating. In the home fixture, Standard scored in injury time, ending the match 1–1. In the away game, the situation worsened when Standard's goalkeeper, Sinan Bolat, equalised in the fifth minute of injury time from a free-kick, resulting in a 1–1 draw. This outcome dashed AZ's hopes of securing the third spot in the group, which would have granted them entry into the Europa League knockout phase. The disappointing Champions League campaign ultimately led to the dismissal of head coach Ronald Koeman.

==== Successive seasons in Europa League ====
AZ had a commendable journey in European football across the following seasons. In the 2010–11 UEFA Europa League, their fifth-place finish in the Eredivisie granted them entry into the third qualifying round. Although they progressed through the qualifications, AZ finished third in the group, ending their European campaign early. Notably, Dynamo Kyiv handed them a rare home defeat that season.

The following year, after securing a fourth-place finish in the Eredivisie, AZ navigated a challenging qualification to reach the Europa League group stage. They faced Metalist Kharkiv, Austria Wien, and Malmö FF, securing the second spot undefeated. AZ's journey continued with fixtures against Anderlecht, Udinese, and Valencia. However, despite a historic away win against Anderlecht, losses in the away fixtures against Udinese and Valencia halted their progress, ending their run in the quarter-finals against Valencia with a 4–0 defeat.

In the 2012–13 UEFA Europa League, AZ once again entered the play-off round after securing another fourth-place Eredivisie finish. However, their European campaign met a swift end in the group stage, notably with a heavy 5–0 defeat at home to Guus Hiddink's Anzhi Makhachkala.

Their triumph in the KNVB Cup in the previous season granted them entry into the 2012–13 UEFA Europa League. They overcame Atromitos in the play-off round after facing challenges in the return leg, as Markus Henriksen received a red card in the second minute. A fire at Atromitos' Peristeri Stadium meant that the tie was suspended, and they narrowly advanced after a 2–0 loss. In the group stage, AZ emerged unbeaten, securing qualification for the next round. Under the guidance of Dick Advocaat, they faced familiar foes PAOK, Slovan Liberec, and Anzhi Makhachkala in the knockout stage. Despite avenging their previous season's defeat against Anzhi, they exited in the quarter-finals against Benfica. Subsequently, following a loss in the European football play-off final against Groningen, AZ concluded their streak of five consecutive seasons of European football.

== Record by competition ==
As of 5 November 2026

Competition	Seasons	Pld	W	D	L	GF	GA
UEFA Cup Winners' Cup	2	6	2	2	2	3	5
European Cup / UEFA Champions League	2	12	3	5	4	15	17
UEFA Cup / UEFA Europa League	17	160	74	42	44	273	200
UEFA Conference League	4	54	32	7	15	99	57
Total	25	232	111	56	65	390	279

== Top scorers ==
As of 5 November 2026

Rank	Goals	Player	Date of last goal	Competition
1	18	(Netherlands) Kees Kist	4 November 1981	1981–82 European Cup
2	16	(Greece) Vangelis Pavlidis	30 November 2023	2023–24 UEFA Europa Conference League
3	14	(Republic of Ireland) Troy Parrott	19 March 2026	2025–26 UEFA Conference League
4	13	(Netherlands) Sven Mijnans	19 March 2026	2025–26 UEFA Conference League
5	10	(Belgium) Jan Peters	16 September 1981	1981–82 European Cup
6	9	(Netherlands) Dani de Wit	21 September 2023	2023–24 UEFA Europa Conference League
6	9	(Georgia (country)) Shota Arveladze	8 March 2007	2006–07 UEFA Cup
8	8	(Iceland) Jóhann Berg Guðmundsson	28 November 2013	2013–14 UEFA Europa League
8	8	(Netherlands) Pier Tol	21 October 1981	1981–82 European Cup
10	7	(Iceland) Albert Guðmundsson	4 November 2021	2021–22 UEFA Europa Conference League
10	7	(Netherlands) Barry van Galen	30 November 2005	2005–06 UEFA Cup
10	7	(Denmark) Kristen Nygaard	10 December 1980	1980–81 UEFA Cup
10	7	(Belgium) Maarten Martens	29 March 2012	2011–12 UEFA Europa League
10	7	(Netherlands) Teun Koopmeiners	29 October 2020	2020–21 UEFA Europa League
15	6	(Netherlands) Danny Koevermans	15 March 2007	2006–07 UEFA Cup
15	6	(Netherlands) Mexx Meerdink	5 November 2026	2026–27 UEFA Europa League
15	6	(Netherlands) Myron Boadu	7 November 2019	2019–20 UEFA Europa League
15	6	(Sweden) Pontus Wernbloom	3 November 2011	2011–12 UEFA Europa League
19	5	(Australia) Brett Holman	29 March 2012	2011–12 UEFA Europa League
19	5	(Netherlands) Calvin Stengs	24 October 2019	2019–20 UEFA Europa League
19	5	(Netherlands) Denny Landzaat	29 September 2005	2005–06 UEFA Cup
19	5	(Ghana) Ibrahim Sadiq	11 December 2025	2025–26 UEFA Conference League
19	5	(Austria) Kurt Welzl	20 May 1981	1980–81 UEFA Cup
19	5	(Sweden) Mayckel Lahdo	31 August 2023	2023–24 UEFA Conference League
19	5	(Belgium) Mousa Dembélé	29 November 2007	2007–08 UEFA Cup
19	5	(Netherlands) Ruben van Bommel	12 December 2024	2024–25 UEFA Europa League

== Opponents by country ==
As of 5 November 2026

Rank	Country	Pld	W	D	L	GF	GA	Opponents
1	England	23	3	5	15	22	45	Arsenal (2), Aston Villa (2), Crystal Palace F.C. (1), Everton (1), Ipswich Town (4), Liverpool (2), Manchester United (2), Middlesbrough (1), Newcastle United (2), Sunderland A.F.C. (1), Tottenham Hotspur (3), West Ham United (2)
2	Spain	14	6	4	4	16	19	Athletic Bilbao (3), Barcelona (2), Real Betis (2), Real Sociedad (2), Sevilla (1), Valencia (2), Villarreal (2)
2	Ukraine	14	6	4	4	19	17	Dnipro (1), Dnipro-1 (2), Dynamo Kyiv (3), Mariupol (2), Metalist Kharkiv (2), Shakhtar Donetsk (4)
4	Greece	11	6	3	2	15	11	AEL (1), Atromitos (2), Olympiacos (2), PAOK (4), PAS Giannina (2)
5	Belgium	10	5	3	2	13	7	Anderlecht (4), Antwerp (2), Lokeren (2), Standard Liège (2)
5	Czech Republic	10	6	4	0	18	7	Jablonec (4), Slovan Liberec (3), Sparta Prague (2), Viktoria Plzeň (1)
5	Italy	10	6	1	3	12	9	Inter Milan (2), Juventus FC (1), Lazio (2), Napoli (2), Roma (1), Udinese (2)
5	Turkey	10	5	5	0	23	14	Fenerbahçe (3), Galatasaray (3), İstanbul Başakşehir (2), Kayserispor (2)
9	Portugal	9	5	1	3	14	8	Benfica (2), Braga (1), Gil Vicente (2), Paços de Ferreira (2), Sporting CP (2)
9	Russia	9	3	2	4	11	20	Anzhi Makhachkala (4), Krylia Sovetov (2), Zenit Saint Petersburg (3)
11	Kazakhstan	8	5	1	2	18	6	Aktobe (2), Astana (2), Kairat (2), Shakhter Karagandy (2)
11	Norway	8	3	3	2	18	11	Aalesunds (2), Bodø/Glimt (2), Brann (2), Start (2)
11	Serbia (Note: Includes the teams of former Yugoslavia)	8	2	4	2	17	11	Partizan (4), Radnički Niš (2), Vojvodina (2)
14	Germany	7	1	2	4	5	12	Alemannia Aachen (2), FC Augsburg (2), 1. FC Nürnberg (1), Werder Bremen (2)
14	Sweden	7	4	2	1	12	4	IF Elfsborg (1), IFK Göteborg (2), BK Häcken (2), Malmö FF (2)
16	Bulgaria	6	4	2	0	16	4	Levski Sofia (4), Ludogorets Razgrad (1), Litex Lovech (1)
17	Austria	5	0	3	2	5	9	Austria Wien (2), Grazer AK (1), LASK (2)
17	France	5	2	1	2	8	14	Auxerre (1), Lyon (2), Sochaux (2)
17	(Republic of Ireland) Ireland	5	3	2	0	6	2	Dundalk (2), Limerick (2), Shelbourne F.C. (1)
17	Israel	5	3	1	1	6	3	Hapoel Be'er Sheva F.C. (1), Maccabi Haifa (2), Maccabi Tel Aviv (2)
17	Scotland	5	3	0	2	10	4	Celtic (2), Dundee United (2), Rangers (1)
22	Bosnia and Herzegovina	4	3	0	1	9	4	Tuzla City (2), Zrinjski Mostar (2)
22	Liechtenstein	4	4	0	0	10	2	Vaduz (4)
22	Luxembourg	4	4	0	0	26	1	Red Boys Differdange (4)
22	Poland	4	2	1	1	4	3	Amica Wronki (1), Jagiellonia Białystok (1), Legia Warsaw (2)
22	Romania	4	3	0	1	7	3	CFR Cluj (2), Astra Giurgiu (2)
27	Armenia	3	2	0	1	8	1	FC Ararat-Armenia (1), FC Noah (2)
27	Cyprus	3	1	0	2	3	7	AEK Larnaca FC (1), Apollon Limassol (2)
29	Andorra	2	2	0	0	3	0	Santa Coloma (2)
29	Belarus	2	1	0	1	4	4	BATE Borisov (2)
29	Croatia	2	1	0	1	5	3	Rijeka (2)
29	Denmark	2	1	1	0	3	2	Randers (2)
29	Finland	2	1	0	1	8	4	Ilves (2)
29	Moldova	2	1	1	0	3	2	Sheriff Tiraspol (2)
29	Switzerland	2	2	0	0	6	0	Grasshopper (2)
36	Hungary	1	0	0	1	3	4	Ferencváros (1)
36	Kosovo	1	1	0	0	3	0	Drita (1)
36	Slovakia	1	1	0	0	1	0	Slovan Bratislava (1)

== Most frequent opponents ==
As of 16 April 2026

Rank	Club	Country	Pld	W	D	L	GF	GA
1	Anderlecht	Belgium	4	3	0	1	4	2
1	Anzhi Makhachkala	Russia	4	1	1	2	1	6
1	Ipswich Town	England	4	1	1	2	4	7
1	Jablonec	Czech Republic	4	2	2	0	5	2
1	Levski Sofia	Bulgaria	4	3	1	0	12	2
1	PAOK	Greece	4	2	2	0	8	6
1	Partizan	Serbia	4	0	2	2	7	9
1	Red Boys Differdange	Luxembourg	4	4	0	0	26	1
1	Shakhtar Donetsk	Ukraine	4	2	1	1	7	7
1	Vaduz	Liechtenstein	4	4	0	0	10	2

== Matches ==
As of 5 November 2026

Competition	Round	Opponent	Home	Away	Aggregate
1977–78 UEFA Cup	First round	(Luxembourg) Red Boys Differdange	11–1	5–0	16–1
1977–78 UEFA Cup	Second round	(Spain) Barcelona	1–1	1–1 (a.e.t.)	2–2 (4–5 p)
1978–79 Cup Winners' Cup	First round	(England) Ipswich Town	0–0	0–2	0–2
1980–81 UEFA Cup	First round	(Luxembourg) Red Boys Differdange	6–0	4–0	10–0
1980–81 UEFA Cup	Second round	(Bulgaria) Levski Sofia	5–0	1–1	6–1
1980–81 UEFA Cup	Third round	(Socialist Federal Republic of Yugoslavia) Radnički Niš	5–0	2–2	7–2
1980–81 UEFA Cup	Quarter-finals	(Belgium) Lokeren	2–0	0–1	2–1
1980–81 UEFA Cup	Semi-finals	(France) Sochaux	3–2	1–1	4–3
1980–81 UEFA Cup	Final	(England) Ipswich Town	4–2	0–3	4–5
1981–82 European Cup	First round	(Norway) Start	1–0	3–1	4–1
1981–82 European Cup	Round of 16	(England) Liverpool	2–2	2–3	4–5
1982–83 Cup Winners' Cup	First round	(Republic of Ireland) Limerick	1–0	1–1	2–1
1982–83 Cup Winners' Cup	Second round	(Italy) Inter Milan	1–0	0–2	1–2
2004–05 UEFA Cup	First round	(Greece) PAOK	2–1	3–2	5–3
2004–05 UEFA Cup	Group F	(France) Auxerre	2–0	—N/a	1st
2004–05 UEFA Cup	Group F	(Poland) Amica Wronki	—N/a	3–1	1st
2004–05 UEFA Cup	Group F	(Scotland) Rangers	1–0	—N/a	1st
2004–05 UEFA Cup	Group F	(Austria) Grazer AK	—N/a	0–2	1st
2004–05 UEFA Cup	Round of 32	(Germany) Alemannia Aachen	2–1	0–0	2–1
2004–05 UEFA Cup	Round of 16	(Ukraine) Shakhtar Donetsk	2–1	3–1	5–2
2004–05 UEFA Cup	Quarter-finals	(Spain) Villarreal	1–1	2–1	3–2
2004–05 UEFA Cup	Semi-finals	(Portugal) Sporting CP	3–2	1–2	4–4 (a)
2005–06 UEFA Cup	First round	(Russia) Sovetov Samara	3–1	3–5	6–6 (a)
2005–06 UEFA Cup	Group D	(Ukraine) Dnipro Dnipropetrovsk	—N/a	2–1	2nd
2005–06 UEFA Cup	Group D	(England) Middlesbrough	0–0	—N/a	2nd
2005–06 UEFA Cup	Group D	(Bulgaria) Litex Lovech	—N/a	2–0	2nd
2005–06 UEFA Cup	Group D	(Switzerland) Grasshoppers	1–0	—N/a	2nd
2005–06 UEFA Cup	Round of 32	(Spain) Real Betis	2–1	0–2	2–3
2006–07 UEFA Cup	First round	(Turkey) Kayserispor	3–2	1–1	4–3
2006–07 UEFA Cup	Group C	(Portugal) Braga	3–0	—N/a	1st
2006–07 UEFA Cup	Group C	(Switzerland) Grasshoppers	—N/a	5–2	1st
2006–07 UEFA Cup	Group C	(Czech Republic) Slovan Liberec	2–2	—N/a	1st
2006–07 UEFA Cup	Group C	(Spain) Sevilla	—N/a	2–1	1st
2006–07 UEFA Cup	Round of 32	(Turkey) Fenerbahçe	2–2	3–3	5–5 (a)
2006–07 UEFA Cup	Round of 16	(England) Newcastle United	2–0	2–4	4–4 (a)
2006–07 UEFA Cup	Quarter-finals	(Germany) Werder Bremen	0–0	1–4	1–4
2007–08 UEFA Cup	First round	(Portugal) Paços Ferreira	0–0	1–0	1–0
2007–08 UEFA Cup	Group A	(Russia) Zenit Saint Petersburg	—N/a	1–1	4th
2007–08 UEFA Cup	Group A	(Greece) AEL	1–0	—N/a	4th
2007–08 UEFA Cup	Group A	(Germany) 1. FC Nürnberg	—N/a	1–2	4th
2007–08 UEFA Cup	Group A	(England) Everton	2–3	—N/a	4th
2009–10 Champions League	Group H	(Greece) Olympiacos	0–0	0–1	4th
2009–10 Champions League	Group H	(Belgium) Standard Liège	1–1	1–1	4th
2009–10 Champions League	Group H	(England) Arsenal	1–1	1–4	4th
2010–11 Europa League	Third qualifying round	(Sweden) IFK Göteborg	2–0	0–1	2–1
2010–11 Europa League	Playoff round	(Kazakhstan) Aktobe	2–0	1–2	3–2
2010–11 Europa League	Group E	(Moldova) Sheriff Tiraspol	2–1	1–1	3rd
2010–11 Europa League	Group E	(Belarus) BATE Borisov	3–0	1–4	3rd
2010–11 Europa League	Group E	(Ukraine) Dynamo Kyiv	1–2	0–2	3rd
2011–12 Europa League	Third qualifying round	(Czech Republic) FK Jablonec	2–0	1–1	3–1
2011–12 Europa League	Playoff round	(Norway) Aalesunds FK	6–0	1–2	7–2
2011–12 Europa League	Group G	(Sweden) Malmö FF	4–1	0–0	2nd
2011–12 Europa League	Group G	(Ukraine) Metalist Kharkiv	1–1	1–1	2nd
2011–12 Europa League	Group G	Austria Wien	2–2	2–2	2nd
2011–12 Europa League	Round of 32	(Belgium) Anderlecht	1–0	1–0	2–0
2011–12 Europa League	Round of 16	(Italy) Udinese	2–0	1–2	3–2
2011–12 Europa League	Quarter-finals	(Spain) Valencia	2–1	0–4	2–5
2012–13 Europa League	Play-off round	(Russia) Anzhi Makhachkala	0–5	0–1	0–6
2013–14 Europa League	Play-off round	(Greece) Atromitos	0–2 (Note: The match was abandoned after 59 minutes due to a fire at the stadium, and was resumed on 30 August 2013, 11:00, from the point of abandonment.)	3–1	3–3 (a)
2013–14 Europa League	Group L	(Israel) Maccabi Haifa	2–0	1–0	1st
2013–14 Europa League	Group L	(Greece) PAOK	1–1	2–2	1st
2013–14 Europa League	Group L	(Kazakhstan) Shakhter Karagandy	1–0	1–1	1st
2013–14 Europa League	Round of 32	(Czech Republic) Slovan Liberec	1–1	1–0	2–1
2013–14 Europa League	Round of 16	(Russia) Anzhi Makhachkala	1–0	0–0	1–0
2013–14 Europa League	Quarter-finals	(Portugal) Benfica	0–1	0–2	0–3
2015–16 Europa League	Third qualifying round	(Turkey) İstanbul Başakşehir	2–0	2–1	4–1
2015–16 Europa League	Play-off round	(Romania) Astra Giurgiu	2–0	2–3	4–3
2015–16 Europa League	Group L	(Serbia) Partizan	1–2	2–3	4th
2015–16 Europa League	Group L	(Spain) Athletic Bilbao	2–1	2–2	4th
2015–16 Europa League	Group L	(Germany) FC Augsburg	0–1	1–4	4th
2016–17 Europa League	Third qualifying round	(Greece) PAS Giannina	1–0	2–1	3–1
2016–17 Europa League	Play-off round	(Serbia) Vojvodina	0–0	3–0	3–0
2016–17 Europa League	Group D	(Republic of Ireland) Dundalk	1–1	1–0	2nd
2016–17 Europa League	Group D	(Russia) Zenit Saint Petersburg	3–2	0–5	2nd
2016–17 Europa League	Group D	(Israel) Maccabi Tel Aviv	1–2	0–0	2nd
2016–17 Europa League	Round of 32	(France) Lyon	1–4	1–7	2–11
2018–19 Europa League	Second qualifying round	(Kazakhstan) Kairat	2–1	0–2	2–3
2019–20 Europa League	Second qualifying round	(Sweden) BK Häcken	0–0	3–0	3–0
2019–20 Europa League	Third qualifying round	(Ukraine) Mariupol	4–0	0–0	4–0
2019–20 Europa League	Play-off round	(Belgium) Antwerp	1–1	4–1 (a.e.t.)	5–2
2019–20 Europa League	Group L	(Serbia) Partizan	2–2	2–2	2nd
2019–20 Europa League	Group L	(England) Manchester United	0–0	0–4	2nd
2019–20 Europa League	Group L	(Kazakhstan) Astana	6–0	5–0	2nd
2019–20 Europa League	Round of 32	(Austria) LASK	1–1	0–2	1–3
2020–21 Champions League	2Q	(Czech Republic) Viktoria Plzeň	3–1 (a.e.t.)	—N/a	3–1
2020–21 Champions League	3Q	(Ukraine) Dynamo Kyiv	—N/a	0–2	0–2
2020–21 Europa League	Group F	(Italy) Napoli	1–1	1–0	3rd
2020–21 Europa League	Group F	(Croatia) Rijeka	4–1	1–2	3rd
2020–21 Europa League	Group F	(Spain) Real Sociedad	0–0	0–1	3rd
2021–22 Europa Conference League	Group D	(Denmark) Randers	1–0	2–2	1st
2021–22 Europa Conference League	Group D	(Czech Republic) Jablonec	1–0	1–1	1st
2021–22 Europa Conference League	Group D	(Romania) CFR Cluj	2–0	1–0	1st
2021–22 Europa Conference League	Round of 16	(Norway) Bodø/Glimt	2–2	1–2	3–4
2022–23 Europa Conference League	Second qualifying round	(Bosnia and Herzegovina) Tuzla City	1–0	4–0	5–0
2022–23 Europa Conference League	Third qualifying round	(Scotland) Dundee United	0–1	7–0	7–1
2022–23 Europa Conference League	Play-off round	(Portugal) Gil Vicente	4–0	2–1	6–1
2022–23 Europa Conference League	Group E	(Ukraine) Dnipro-1	2–1	1–0	1st
2022–23 Europa Conference League	Group E	(Liechtenstein) Vaduz	4–1	2–1	1st
2022–23 Europa Conference League	Group E	(Cyprus) Apollon Limassol	3–2	0–1	1st
2022–23 Europa Conference League	Round of 16	(Italy) Lazio	2–1	2–1	4–2
2022–23 Europa Conference League	Quarter-finals	(Belgium) Anderlecht	0–2	2–0 (a.e.t.)	2–2 (4–1 p.)
2022–23 Europa Conference League	Semi-finals	(England) West Ham United	1–2	0–1	1–3
2023–24 Europa Conference League	Third qualifying round	(Andorra) FC Santa Coloma	2–0	1–0	3–0
2023–24 Europa Conference League	Play-off round	(Norway) Brann	1–1	3–3 (a.e.t.)	4–4 (6–5 p.)
2023–24 Europa Conference League	Group E	(Bosnia and Herzegovina) Zrinjski Mostar	1–0	3–4	3rd
2023–24 Europa Conference League	Group E	(Poland) Legia Warsaw	1–0	0–2	3rd
2023–24 Europa Conference League	Group E	(England) Aston Villa	1–4	1–2	3rd
2024–25 Europa League	League phase	(Sweden) IF Elfsborg	3–2	—N/a	19th
2024–25 Europa League	League phase	(Spain) Athletic Bilbao	—N/a	0–2	19th
2024–25 Europa League	League phase	(England) Tottenham Hotspur	—N/a	0–1	19th
2024–25 Europa League	League phase	(Turkey) Fenerbahçe	3–1	—N/a	19th
2024–25 Europa League	League phase	(Turkey) Galatasaray	1–1	—N/a	19th
2024–25 Europa League	League phase	(Bulgaria) Ludogorets Razgrad	—N/a	2–2	19th
2024–25 Europa League	League phase	(Italy) Roma	1–0	—N/a	19th
2024–25 Europa League	League phase	(Hungary) Ferencváros	—N/a	3–4	19th
2024–25 Europa League	Knockout phase play-offs	(Turkey) Galatasaray	4–1	2–2	6–3
2024–25 Europa League	Round of 16	(England) Tottenham Hotspur	1–0	1–3	2–3
2025–26 Conference League	Second qualifying round	(Finland) Ilves	5–0	3–4	8–4
2025–26 Conference League	Third qualifying round	(Liechtenstein) Vaduz	3–0	1–0	4–0
2025–26 Conference League	Play-off round	(Bulgaria) Levski Sofia	4–1	2–0	6–1
2025–26 Conference League	League phase	(Cyprus) AEK Larnaca	—N/a	0–4	14th
2025–26 Conference League	League phase	(Slovakia) Slovan Bratislava	1–0	—N/a	14th
2025–26 Conference League	League phase	(England) Crystal Palace	—N/a	1–3	14th
2025–26 Conference League	League phase	(Republic of Ireland) Shelbourne	2–0	—N/a	14th
2025–26 Conference League	League phase	(Kosovo) Drita	—N/a	3–0	14th
2025–26 Conference League	League phase	(Poland) Jagiellonia Białystok	0–0	—N/a	14th
2025–26 Conference League	Knockout phase play-offs	(Armenia) Noah	4–0	0–1	4–1
2025–26 Conference League	Round of 16	(Czech Republic) Sparta Prague	2–1	4–0	6–1
2025–26 Conference League	Quarter-finals	(Ukraine) Shakhtar Donetsk	2–2	0–3	2–5
2026–27 Europa League	League phase	(England) Sunderland	—N/a	0–1	
2026–27 Europa League	League phase	(Israel) Hapoel Be'er Sheva	2–1	—N/a	
2026–27 Europa League	League phase	Ararat-Armenia	—N/a	4–0	
2026–27 Europa League	League phase	(Italy) Juventus	1–2	—N/a	
2026–27 Europa League	League phase	(Czech Republic) Sparta Prague	—N/a		
2026–27 Europa League	League phase	(Austria) Sturm Graz		—N/a	
2026–27 Europa League	League phase	(Croatia) Dinamo Zagreb		—N/a	
2026–27 Europa League	League phase	(Portugal) Benfica	—N/a		
UEFA club coefficient: 62.875 (35th) (as per 2025–26 season)

== Honours ==
- UEFA Youth League
  - Winners (1): 2022–23
