= Jan Peters (footballer, born 1954) =

Dutch association football manager and player

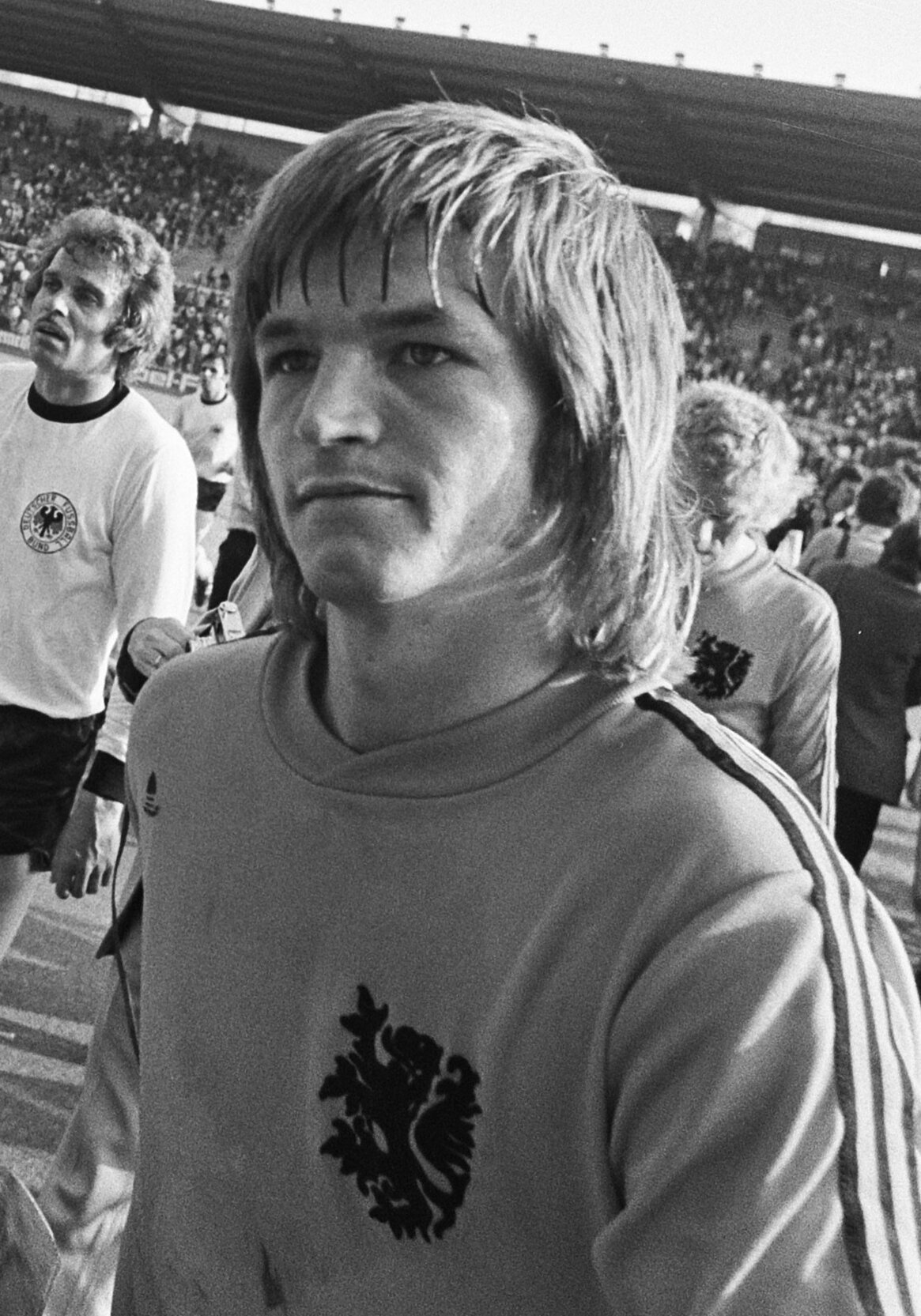
- Peters with Dutch national team in 1975

Personal information
- Full name: Johannes Wilhelmus Peters
- Date of birth: 18 August 1954 (age 72)
- Place of birth: Groesbeek, Netherlands
- Height: 1.72 m (5 ft 8 in)
- Position: Midfielder

Youth career
- VV Germania

Senior career*
Years	Team	Apps	(Gls)
1971–1977	NEC	165	(16)
1977–1982	AZ '67	120	(32)
1982–1985	Genoa	53	(5)
1985–1986	Atalanta	8	(1)
1986–1988	NEC	41	(3)
1988–1991	De Treffers		
Total		387	(57)

International career
1974–1982	Netherlands	31	(4)

Managerial career
- 1992–1995: SJN
- 1995–1998: De Treffers
- 1999: TOP Oss (caretaker)
- 2004–2006: De Treffers
- 2009: De Treffers (caretaker)
Medal record
Representing Netherlands
UEFA European Championship
Third place	1976 Yugoslavia
- * Club domestic league appearances and goals

Johannes "Jan" Wilhelmus Peters (born 18 August 1954) is a Dutch former professional footballer and coach.

== Club career ==
Nicknamed Jantje Breed, as he was renowned for his passes to the side, Peters started his career with VV Germania and then played for NEC. He made his debut for NEC on 14 November 1971 in a home game against FC Groningen.

In 1974, 19-year-old Peters attracted the interest of Ajax, where Hans Kraay Sr. had just become manager, but the transfer eventually fell through. In July 1977, he signed with AZ '67, where Kraay Sr. had now become manager. At AZ, Peters played together with players such as Ronald Spelbos, Peter Arntz, Kristen Nygaard, Kurt Welzl, Kees Kist and Pier Tol, a team which in the 1980–81 season won the Eredivisie title, the KNVB Cup, and reached the final of the UEFA Cup. After five seasons, in which AZ was constantly in the top 4 clubs in the Eredivisie and won the national cup three times, Peters left for Serie A club Genoa in the summer of 1982. In Italy he also played for Atalanta, before returning to NEC, and to finish his career in amateur football with De Treffers.

== International career ==
Peters obtained 31 caps for the Dutch national team, scoring four goals, in the 1970s and early 1980s. He is famous for scoring the goals that beat England 2–0 at Wembley in 1977.

== Managerial career ==
After his retirement from professional football, Peters began coaching amateur club SJN in 1992. In 1995, he took over as manager of his former club De Treffers from his hometown of Groesbeek. He later also coached the second team of TOP Oss, a club where he was also the caretaker coach shortly in 1999.

== Career statistics ==
=== International ===
Appearances and goals by national team and year
National team	Year	Apps	Goals
Netherlands	1974	2	0
Netherlands	1975	5	0
Netherlands	1976	3	0
Netherlands	1977	2	2
Netherlands	1978	4	0
Netherlands	1979	4	1
Netherlands	1980	4	0
Netherlands	1981	5	1
Netherlands	1982	2	0
Total		31	4

Scores and results list the Netherlands' goal tally first, score column indicates score after each Peters goal.

List of international goals scored by Jan Peters
No.	Date	Venue	Opponent	Score	Result	Competition
1	9 February 1977	Wembley, London, United Kingdom	England	1–0	2–0	Friendly
2	9 February 1977	Wembley, London, United Kingdom	England	2–0	2–0	Friendly
3	28 March 1979	Philips Stadion, Eindhoven, Netherlands	Switzerland	3–0	3–0	UEFA Euro 1980 qualification
4	6 January 1981	Estadio Centenario, Montevideo, Uruguay	Italy	1–1	1–1	1980 World Champions' Gold Cup

== Honours ==
=== Player ===
NEC

- Eerste Divisie: 1974–75

AZ '67

- Eredivisie: 1980–81
- KNVB Cup: 1977–78, 1980–81, 1981–82

De Treffers

- Netherlands Overall Amateur Championship: 1990–91
- Netherlands Sunday Amateur Championship: 1990–91
- Hoofdklasse Sunday B: 1989–90, 1990–91

Netherlands

- UEFA European Championship third-place: 1976

=== Manager ===
De Treffers

- Netherlands Overall Amateur Championship: 1997–98
- Netherlands Sunday Amateur Championship: 1997–98
- Hoofdklasse Sunday C: 1997–98, 2004–05
