= Jos Jonker =

Dutch footballer

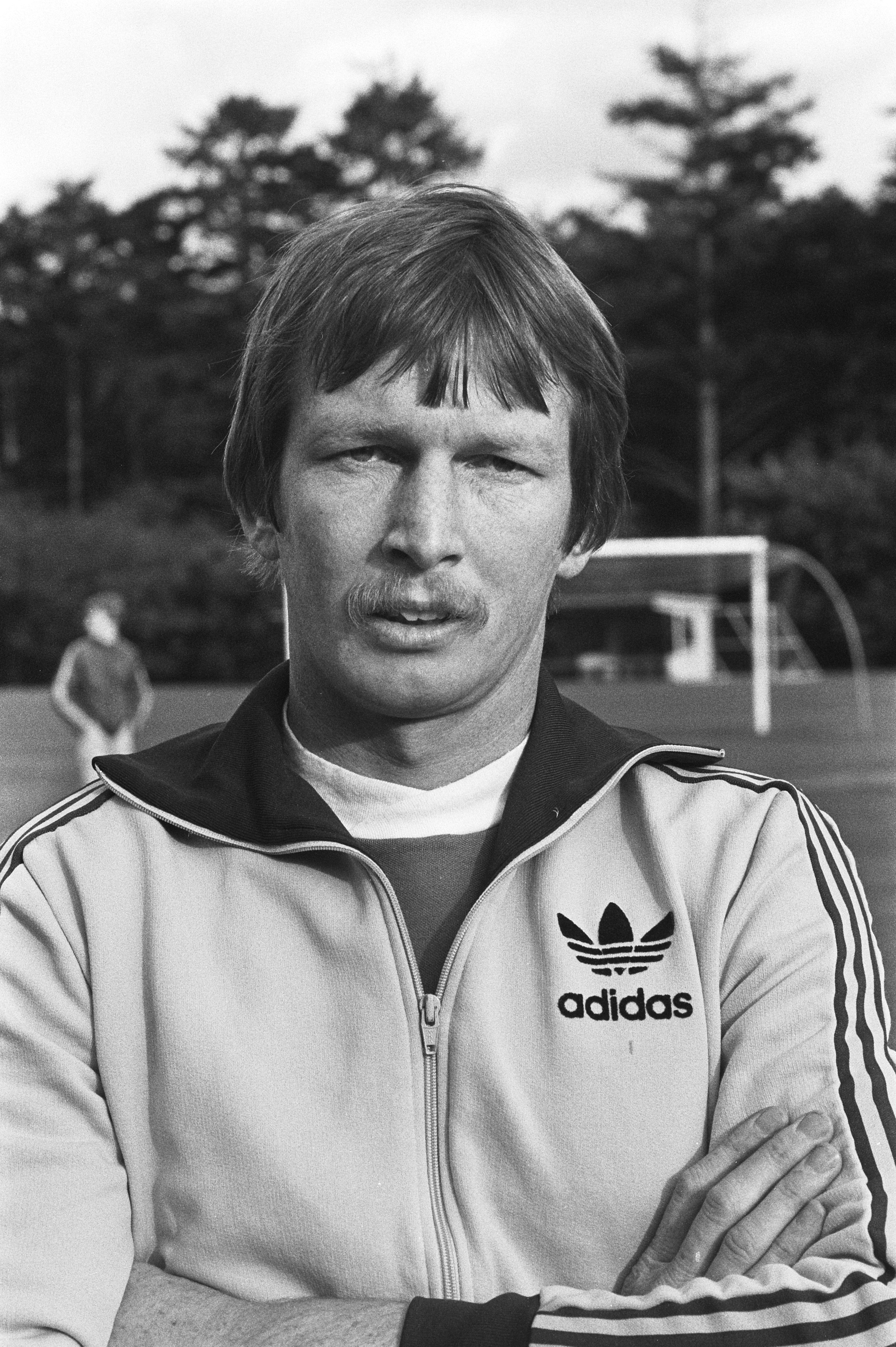
- Jonker in 1980

Personal information
- Date of birth: 23 April 1951
- Place of birth: Castricum, Netherlands
- Position: Midfielder

Senior career*
Years	Team	Apps	(Gls)
196?–1970	Vitesse '22	?	(?)
1970–1978	Telstar	225	(18)
1978–1980	Den Haag	64	(5)
1980–1983	AZ '67	90	(14)
Total		379	(37)

International career
1980–1981	Netherlands	2	(0)
- * Club domestic league appearances and goals

Jos Jonker (born 23 April 1951) is a Dutch former professional footballer. A midfielder, he played for Vitesse '22, Telstar, FC Den Haag and AZ '67 during his career. He also gained two caps for the Netherlands national team.

== Football career ==
Jonker began his career with Vitesse '22 from his hometown Castricum, North Holland. From 1970, Jonker played eight years for Telstar. After the club suffered relegation from the Eredivisie in the 1977–78 season, he moved to Den Haag alongside Ton Wickel. According to journalist Jan-Hermen de Bruijn, these signings meant that then head coach Piet de Visser rejected the transfer of Diego Maradona to Den Haag, as the club had enough midfielders. This was subsequently denied by De Visser, who stated that Maradona was already hugely popular in Argentina at the time, and would have cost too much for the club. Nevertheless, Jonker experienced his breakthrough at the club, and after two seasons in The Hague, he signed with AZ '67 in 1980 at the age of 29. The club from Alkmaar was already a top club in the second half of the 1970s, but had not yet won the national title, and Jonker was a welcome reinforcement in midfield in 1980. Jonker played for AZ for three seasons and retired from professional football after the 1982–83 season, instead choosing to return to Vitesse '22 at amateur level.

Jonker played 19 matches in the European Cup on behalf of AZ '67, and was part of the successful team which convincingly won the Eredivisie with a goal difference of +71, and reached the final of the UEFA Cup in the 1980–81 season, in which he scored in the return leg.

He gained two caps for the Netherlands national team, in which he played against West Germany and Cyprus.

== Honours ==
AZ

- Eredivisie: 1980–81
- KNVB Cup: 1980–81, 1981–82
- UEFA Cup runner-up: 1980–81
