= Peter Arntz =

Dutch footballer (born 1953)

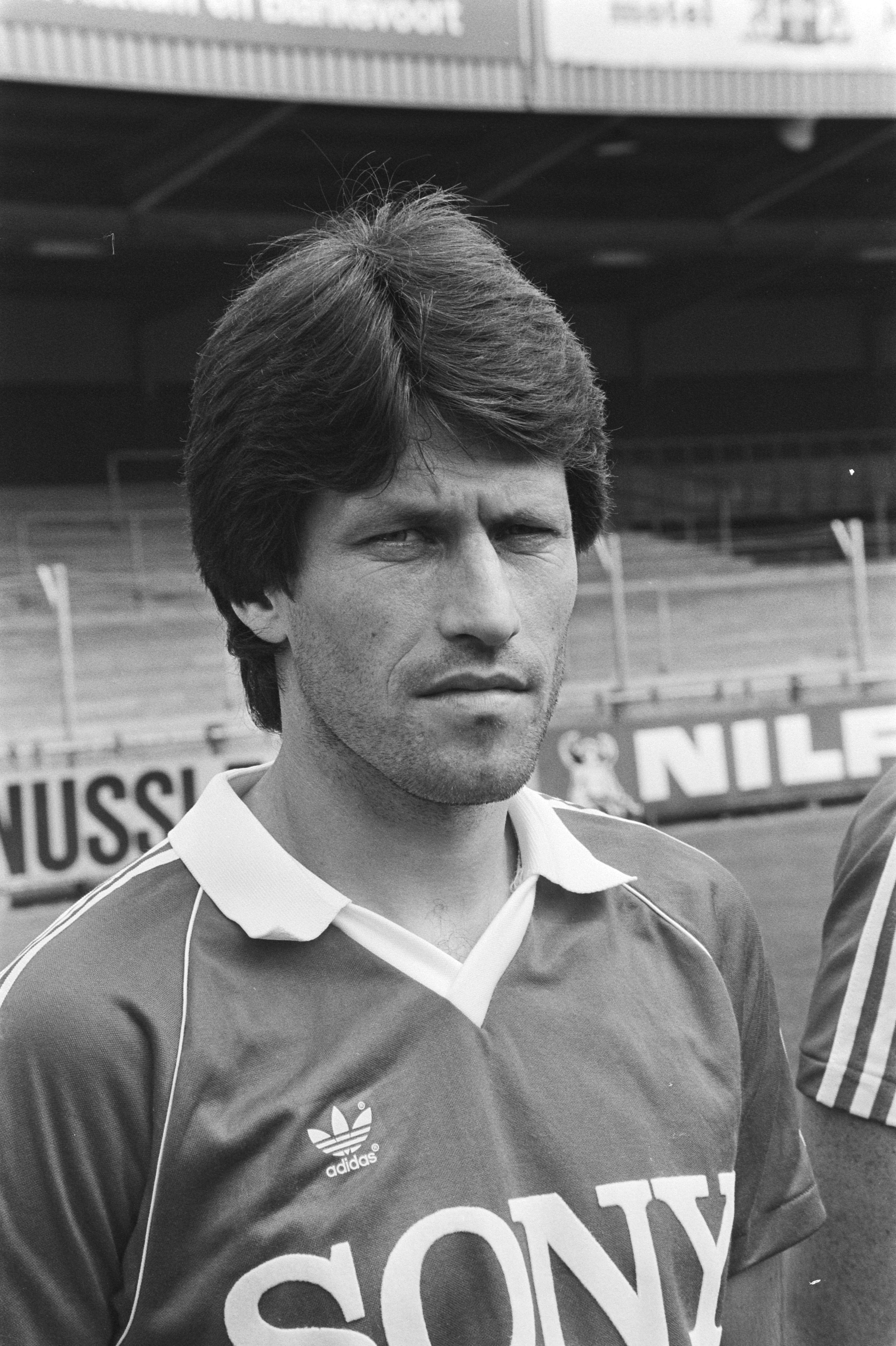
- Arntz in 1982

Personal information
- Full name: Petrus Wilhelmus Arntz
- Date of birth: 5 February 1953 (age 73)
- Place of birth: Leuth, Netherlands
- Position: Midfielder

Senior career*
| Years | Team | Apps | (Gls) |
| 1970–1976 | Go Ahead Eagles | 151 | (23) |
| 1976–1985 | AZ'67 | 288 | (13) |
| Total | | 439 | (36) |

International career
| 1975–1981 | Netherlands | 5 | (0) |
Medal record
Representing Netherlands
UEFA European Championship
| Third place | 1976 Yugoslavia |
- * Club domestic league appearances and goals

Peter Arntz (born 5 February 1953) is a Dutch retired footballer who played as a midfielder.

== Club career ==
Arntz was born in Leuth, Gelderland. He came through the famous Go Ahead Eagles youth system and made his debut for their senior team managed by Barry Hughes in February 1971 away against Ajax.

He moved to AZ'67 after the 1976 European Championship and twice won the KNVB Cup with them. In 1981, he won the league title with them and he played in both legs of the 1981 UEFA Cup Final which AZ'67 lost to Ipswich Town. May 25, 1986, he played his last match (AZ'67-Haarlem 1-1).

== International career ==
Arntz made his debut for the Netherlands in an April 1975 friendly match against Belgium and earned a total of 5 caps, scoring no goals. He was included in the Dutch squad for the 1976 UEFA European Football Championship.

His final international was a February 1981 FIFA World Cup qualification match against Cyprus.

== Retirement ==
After retiring as a player, Arntz worked as a scout for AZ from 1997 to 2011. He moved to Sweden with his wife in 2016.
