= 1980–81 KNVB Cup =

Tournament details
- Country: Netherlands
- Teams: 46

Final positions
- Champions: AZ'67
- Runners-up: Ajax

The 1980-81 KNVB Cup 63rd edition of the Dutch national football annual knockout tournament for the KNVB Cup. 46 teams contested, beginning on 6 September 1980 and ending at the final on 28 May 1981.

AZ from Alkmaar (at the time called AZ'67) beat Ajax 3–1 and won the cup for the second time.

During the quarter and semi-finals, two-legged matches were held.

== Teams ==
- All 18 participants of the Eredivisie 1980-81
- All 19 participants of the Eerste Divisie 1980-81
- 9 teams from lower (amateur) leagues

== First round ==
The matches of the first round were played on 6-7 September 1980.

Home team	Result	Away team
Fortuna Sittard _{1}	2–0 (aet)	SC Cambuur _{1}
HFC Haarlem _{1}	3–0	Vitesse Arnhem _{1}
sc Heerenveen _{1}	3–2	ACV _{A}
ROHDA Raalte _{A}	(p) 1-1	FC Eindhoven _{1}
SC Veendam _{1}	2–0	Helmond Sport _{1}
SVV _{1}	5–1	DESK _{A}
FC Volendam _{1}	3–1	VV Noordwijk _{A}

Home team	Result	Away team
VV Caesar _{A}	2–5 (aet)	SC Amersfoort _{1}
De Graafschap _{1}	2–3	Telstar _{1}
DETO _{A}	2–5	DS '79 _{1}
FC Amsterdam _{1}	8–1	VV Arnemuiden _{A}
FC Den Bosch _{1}	3–0	VV Rheden _{A}
FC Vlaardingen _{1}	4–2	XerxesDZB _{A}
FC VVV _{1}	3–2 (aet)	SC Heracles _{1}

_{1} Eerste Divisie; _{A} Amateur teams

== Second round ==
The matches of the second round were played on November 15 and 16, 1980. The Eredivisie clubs entered the tournament here.

Home team	Result	Away team
Go Ahead Eagles _{E}	9–3	ROHDA Raalte
HFC Haarlem	(p) 2-2	NAC _{E}
MVV _{E}	3–0	FC Amsterdam
NEC _{E}	0–1	FC Groningen _{E}
SC Amersfoort	2–2 (p)	FC VVV
Sparta _{E}	2–2 (p)	PEC Zwolle _{E}
Telstar	2–2 (p)	Willem II _{E}
FC Wageningen _{E}	4–1	FC Den Haag _{E}

Home team	Result	Away team
Ajax _{E}	3–0	SVV
AZ'67 _{E}	4–1	sc Heerenveen
DS '79	0–1	PSV _{E}
Excelsior _{E}	2–2 (p)	FC Vlaardingen
FC Den Bosch	2–4	FC Utrecht _{E}
FC Twente _{E}	1–0	FC Volendam
Feyenoord _{E}	5–1	SC Veendam
Fortuna Sittard	1–2	Roda JC _{E}

_{E} Eredivisie

== Round of 16 ==
The matches of the round of 16 were played on January 24 and 25, 1981.

Home team	Result	Away team
Ajax	5–1	FC Twente
AZ'67	5–2	FC Vlaardingen
FC Groningen	3–2	FC VVV
Feyenoord	3–3 (p)	HFC Haarlem
Go Ahead Eagles	3–1	MVV
PSV	4–0	Roda JC
Willem II	2–1	FC Utrecht
FC Wageningen	0–3	PEC Zwolle (on Feb. 4)

== Quarter finals ==
The quarter finals were played on February 25 and April 1, 1980.

Team 1	Aggregate	Team 2	Match 1	Match 2
Ajax	4–1	FC Groningen	3–0	1–1
Go Ahead Eagles	3–2 (aet)	PEC Zwolle	1–1	2–1 (aet)
HFC Haarlem	2–4	AZ'67	1–1	1–3
Willem II	0–3	PSV	0–1	0–2

== Semi-finals ==
The semi-finals were played on April 14 and May 12, 1980.

Team 1	Aggregate	Team 2	Match 1	Match 2
Go Ahead Eagles	3–8	AZ'67	2–2	1–6
PSV	3–4	Ajax	2–2	1–2

== Final ==
28 May 1981

Ajax	1–3	AZ '67
Vanenburg 52'		Tol 23'; Spelbos 58'; Nygaard 73'

Olympisch Stadion, Amsterdam
Attendance: 36,000
Referee: Gerard Geurds

AZ also won the Dutch Eredivisie championship, thereby taking the double. They would participate in the European Cup, so finalists Ajax could play in the Cup Winners' Cup.
