= Frans Thijssen =

Dutch footballer (born 1952)

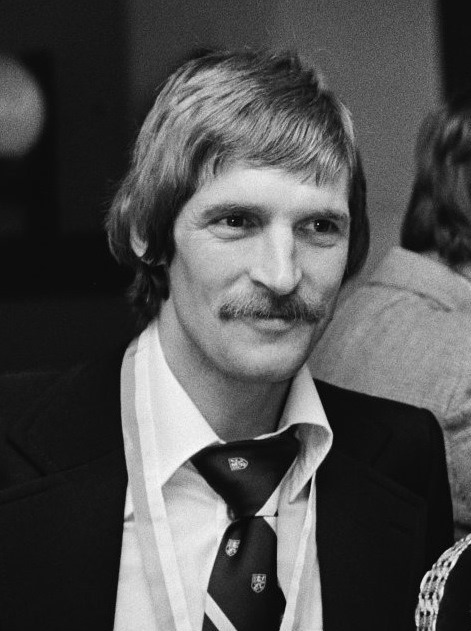
- Thijssen in 1979

Personal information
- Date of birth: 23 January 1952 (age 74)
- Place of birth: Malden, Netherlands
- Position: Midfielder

Youth career
- Juliana '31

Senior career*
Years	Team	Apps	(Gls)
1970–1973	NEC Nijmegen	83	(10)
1973–1979	FC Twente	167	(47)
1979–1983	Ipswich Town	125	(10)
1983–1984	Nottingham Forest	17	(3)
1984	Vancouver Whitecaps	45	(9)
1984–1987	Fortuna Sittard	79	(11)
1987–1988	FC Groningen	25	(0)
1988–1991	Vitesse Arnhem	87	(1)
Total		628	(91)

International career
1975–1981	Netherlands	14	(3)

Managerial career
- 1995–1996: Vitesse Arnhem
- 1997–1998: Malmö FF
- 1999: De Graafschap
- 2000–2001: Fortuna Sittard
- 2014–2015: Brisbane Roar (caretaker manager)
- * Club domestic league appearances and goals

Frans Thijssen (born 23 January 1952) is a Dutch former professional footballer who played as a midfielder. He won fourteen caps for the Netherlands between 1975 and 1981.

== Playing career ==
Thijssen started his professional career in 1970 with NEC Nijmegen. In 1973, he moved to FC Twente, where he played for nearly six seasons.

In 1979, Thijssen moved to England to sign for Ipswich Town joining former FC Twente teammate Arnold Mühren. In 1981 he was the first Dutchman to be voted English Footballer of the Year as he helped Ipswich Town win the UEFA Cup, scoring one goal in each of the two legs of the final. He played a big part in their run to the semi-finals of the FA Cup, and they also finished second in the league that season. He helped them finish second again the following year, but a year later he departed from Portman Road after four years to sign for Brian Clough's Nottingham Forest, but he was not nearly as successful at the City Ground as he had been in East Anglia, and he had left the club within months.

He also had a stint in the NASL with the Vancouver Whitecaps. In 1984, he returned to his native country, to play for Fortuna Sittard (1984–1987), FC Groningen (1987–1988) and Vitesse Arnhem (1988–1991).

== Managerial career ==
After his active career he became a football manager. In 1997, he became manager for the Swedish club Malmö FF and spent nearly two years there. After leading Malmö to a third-place finish in the 1997 Swedish league, Thijssen was sacked as manager for Malmö FF during the middle of season 1998. At the time of his dismissal Malmö was in danger of being relegated to the second division for the first time in the club's history. Thijssen was replaced by Roland Andersson and Thomas Sjöberg.

On 24 November 2014, Thijssen was named interim coach of the Brisbane Roar in the Australian A-League.

== Career statistics ==
=== International ===
Appearances and goals by national team and year
National team	Year	Apps	Goals
Netherlands	1975	4	1
Netherlands	1976	0	0
Netherlands	1977	0	0
Netherlands	1978	0	0
Netherlands	1979	1	1
Netherlands	1980	5	0
Netherlands	1981	4	1
Total		14	3

Scores and results list the Netherlands' goal tally first, score column indicates score after each Thijssen goal.

List of international goals scored by Frans Thijssen
No.	Date	Venue	Opponent	Score	Result	Competition
1	15 October 1975	Olympisch Stadion, Amsterdam, Netherlands	Poland	3–0	3–0	UEFA Euro 1976 qualification
2	21 November 1979	Zentralstadion, Leipzig, East Germany	East Germany	1–2	3–2	UEFA Euro 1980 qualification
3	9 September 1981	De Kuip, Rotterdam, Netherlands	Republic of Ireland	1–0	2–2	1982 FIFA World Cup qualification

== Managerial statistics ==
As of 4 March 2015

Team	Nat	From	To	Record				
Team	Nat	From	To	G	W	D	L	Win %
Brisbane Roar	(Australia)	24 November 2014	8 June 2015	28	11	5	12	39.29
Total				28	11	5	12	39.29

== Honours ==
FC Twente

- KNVB Cup: 1976–77

Ipswich Town

- UEFA Cup: 1980–81

Vitesse Arnhem

- Eerste Divisie: 1988–89

Individual

- Ipswich Town Player of the Year: 1979–80
- Football League First Division PFA Team of the Year: 1980–81
- Football Writers' Association Footballer of the Year 1980–81
- Onze Mondial: 1981
- Eerste Divisie Player of the Year: 1987–88
- Ipswich Town Hall of Fame: Inducted 2008
