= Kurt Welzl =

Austrian footballer

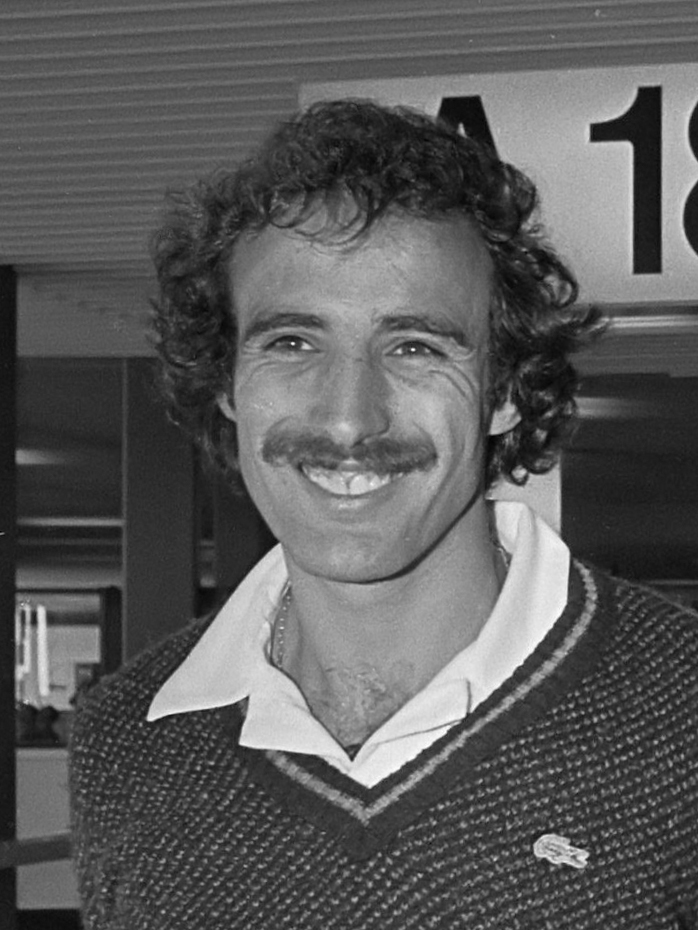
- Welzl in 1980

Personal information
- Date of birth: 6 November 1954 (age 71)
- Place of birth: Vienna, Austria
- Height: 1.80 m (5 ft 11 in)
- Position: Striker

Senior career*
Years	Team	Apps	(Gls)
1972–1974	Wiener SC		
1974–1978	SSW Innsbruck	133	(54)
1978–1981	AZ	66	(39)
1981–1983	Valencia	41	(12)
1983–1984	Gent	10	(1)
1984	Olympiacos	5	(3)
1985–1986	SSW Innsbruck	30	(5)
1986	Swarovski Tirol	5	(2)
1987	Grazer AK	12	(1)
1987–1988	SV Spittal	20	(4)

International career
1975–1982	Austria	22	(10)
- * Club domestic league appearances and goals

Kurt Welzl (born 6 November 1954) is an Austrian former professional footballer who played as a striker. He scored 10 goals in 22 appearances for the Austria national team.
