= 1980–81 Eredivisie =

25th season of the Eredivisie

Eredivisie
- Season: 1980–81
- Champions: AZ '67 (1st title)
- Promoted: FC Groningen; FC Wageningen
- Relegated: SBV Excelsior; FC Wageningen
- European Cup: AZ '67
- Cup Winners' Cup: AFC Ajax
- UEFA Cup: FC Utrecht; Feyenoord; PSV Eindhoven
- Goals: 1,059
- Average goals/game: 3.46
- Top goalscorer: (Netherlands) Ruud Geels; Sparta Rotterdam 22 goals

The Dutch Eredivisie in the 1980–81 season was contested by 18 teams. AZ '67 won the championship.

== League standings ==
Pos	Team	Pld	W	D	L	GF	GA	GD	Pts	Qualification or relegation
1	AZ '67	34	27	6	1	101	30	+71	60	Qualified for 1981–82 European Cup
2	AFC Ajax	34	22	4	8	88	54	+34	48	Qualified for 1981–82 European Cup Winners' Cup (Note: AZ '67 also won the KNVB Cup, thereby taking the double. They would participate in the European Cup, so finalists AFC Ajax would play in the Cup Winners' Cup.)
3	FC Utrecht	34	18	9	7	67	33	+34	45	Qualified for 1981–82 UEFA Cup
4	Feyenoord	34	18	9	7	74	48	+26	45	Qualified for 1981–82 UEFA Cup
5	PSV Eindhoven	34	18	8	8	62	31	+31	44	Qualified for 1981–82 UEFA Cup
6	FC Twente	34	16	7	11	60	49	+11	39	
7	Sparta Rotterdam	34	15	6	13	75	71	+4	36	
8	MVV Maastricht	34	12	10	12	53	65	−12	34	
9	PEC Zwolle	34	10	10	14	42	49	−7	30	
10	Willem II	34	11	7	16	49	69	−20	29	
11	Roda JC	34	9	10	15	67	75	−8	28	
12	Go Ahead Eagles	34	10	8	16	63	75	−12	28	
13	NAC	34	9	9	16	46	66	−20	27	
14	FC Den Haag	34	12	3	19	53	79	−26	27	
15	FC Groningen	34	8	9	17	49	72	−23	25	
16	NEC	34	6	13	15	38	63	−25	25	
17	SBV Excelsior	34	5	11	18	39	67	−28	21	Relegated to Eerste Divisie.
18	FC Wageningen	34	6	9	19	33	63	−30	21	Relegated to Eerste Divisie.

Source: rsssf.com

== Results ==
Home \ Away	AJA	AZ	EXC	FEY	GAE	GRO	DHA	MVV	NAC	NEC	PEC	PSV	RJC	SPA	TWE	UTR	WAG	WIL
Ajax		1–2	7–2	4–1	4–2	5–1	2–0	6–1	4–1	2–0	2–1	5–2	4–2	2–1	5–3	1–0	2–4	1–1
AZ '67	0–1		2–1	5–2	4–1	5–0	4–0	4–1	6–1	6–1	1–0	2–0	3–0	3–2	0–0	2–1	1–0	3–3
Excelsior	2–4	1–3		1–3	3–0	3–2	0–2	0–0	1–2	2–0	3–3	0–0	1–0	1–2	1–1	2–2	1–2	0–2
Feyenoord	4–2	1–5	2–0		2–2	3–3	4–1	4–2	4–0	1–1	3–1	0–1	2–3	2–2	1–0	1–1	6–0	4–0
Go Ahead Eagles	2–4	1–3	4–2	0–2		2–0	3–3	4–2	4–0	3–1	3–3	1–2	5–1	1–2	3–0	2–1	2–2	4–2
FC Groningen	0–1	1–4	2–2	0–0	3–1		0–1	1–2	3–1	2–0	4–2	2–0	3–2	5–0	0–1	1–1	2–0	0–2
FC Den Haag	4–3	0–4	3–1	1–0	1–0	3–3		2–3	1–2	2–0	2–3	1–4	4–4	1–3	1–0	1–3	3–2	0–1
MVV	1–1	1–3	2–0	0–0	1–1	2–2	3–4		2–0	0–0	2–1	0–2	2–1	3–3	1–0	1–3	1–0	2–2
NAC	1–1	1–4	1–1	0–1	2–0	4–2	1–0	4–0		4–0	0–0	0–2	1–0	5–0	1–2	0–3	1–1	0–2
N.E.C.	0–0	0–0	1–1	2–4	2–3	1–1	2–4	4–1	4–2		2–0	0–0	2–2	2–2	0–2	1–3	2–2	4–0
PEC Zwolle	2–0	0–3	1–1	2–2	2–0	0–0	4–2	0–1	0–0	0–1		0–0	3–0	3–1	0–0	0–3	1–0	3–0
PSV	3–1	0–3	4–1	0–1	1–1	5–0	3–0	2–2	3–0	0–0	0–1		4–1	0–0	1–0	2–3	4–0	4–0
Roda JC	2–3	2–2	1–1	2–2	2–2	4–2	3–2	2–5	3–2	2–0	4–0	2–3		4–1	6–1	0–0	4–1	1–1
Sparta Rotterdam	4–3	3–7	5–2	1–2	6–2	2–2	2–0	0–2	3–3	4–1	4–1	3–0	4–1		1–2	2–3	3–0	3–1
FC Twente	3–0	1–1	0–1	3–7	3–1	3–1	4–1	3–3	2–2	6–1	2–0	0–1	3–2	0–3		3–0	2–1	5–1
FC Utrecht	1–2	2–2	2–0	2–0	1–1	3–0	5–0	3–1	3–0	0–1	1–0	0–0	3–1	5–1	2–2		5–0	0–2
FC Wageningen	0–2	1–2	0–0	0–1	2–1	3–0	1–2	1–2	2–2	1–1	0–0	0–3	1–1	1–2	0–1	1–1		2–1
Willem II	1–3	0–2	2–1	1–2	6–1	4–1	2–1	2–1	2–2	1–1	2–5	1–6	2–2	1–0	0–2	0–1	1–2	

Source: rsssf.com
Legend: Blue = home team win; Yellow = draw; Red = away team win.

== See also ==
- 1980–81 Eerste Divisie
- 1980–81 KNVB Cup
