= 1994–95 KNVB Cup =

Tournament details
- Country: Netherlands
- Teams: 83

Final positions
- Champions: Feyenoord
- Runners-up: FC Volendam

Tournament statistics
- Top goal scorer(s): Miroslav Stefanovic (8 goals)

The 1994-95 KNVB Cup (at the time called Amstel Cup or the Dutch Cup) was the 77th edition of the Dutch national football annual knockout tournament for the KNVB Cup. 83 teams contested, beginning on 2 June 1994 and ending at the final on 25 May 1995.

Feyenoord beat FC Volendam 2–1 and won the cup for the tenth time.

== Teams ==
- All 18 participants of the Eredivisie 1994-95, four of which entering in the knock-out stage, the rest entering in the group stage
- All 18 participants of the Eerste Divisie 1994-95, entering in the group stage
- Two youth teams, one entering in the group stage, the other entering in the preliminary round
- 45 teams from lower (amateur) leagues, six of which entering in the group stage, one of which entering in the intermediary round and the rest entering in the preliminary round

== Preliminary round ==
The matches of the preliminary round were played between 2 and 8 June 1994. Only amateur clubs participated.

| Home team | Result | Away team |
|---|---|---|
| RKSV Babberich | (p) 2-2 | SC Enschede |
| Quick '20 | 1–5 | De Treffers |
| SC Genemuiden | 1–2 | SVBO |
| HSV Hoek | (p) 1-1 | Achilles Veen |
| Blauw-Wit Amsterdam | 0–6 | HVV Hollandia |
| DCV | 0–1 | VV Rozenburg |
| HZVV | 0–0 | VV Appingedam |
| DOS Kampen | 4–0 | Be Quick 1887 (on June 21) |
| Nieuw Woensel | 1–0 | RKVV Volharding (on August 14) |

| Home team | Result | Away team |
|---|---|---|
| IJsselmeervogels | 1–2 | ADO '20 |
| FC Lisse | 4–0 | Zwart-Wit '28 |
| SV Heerlen Sport | 2–4 | SV Panningen |
| VVOG | 4–3 | Geldrop/AEK |
| Quick | 2–5 | Quick Boys |
| ADO | 5–1 | VV Nieuwenhoorn |
| VV Baronie | 3–2 | VV Papendrecht |
| RKSVO | 2–7 | TSV LONGA |
| RKVVL | 2–5 | Young RBC |
| USV Holland | (p) 2-2 | GVVV |

=== Intermediary Round ===
Three more clubs had to be eliminated before the group stage, so an intermediary round was held. One extra amateur club (FVC) entered the tournament here. The matches were played on June 9, 14 and 15, 1994.

| Home team | Result | Away team |
|---|---|---|
| VVOG | 1–2 | FC Lisse |
| SVBO | 2–0 | FVC |
| De Treffers | 0–3 | VV Baronie |

== Group stage ==
The matches of the group stage were played between August 13 and September 13, 1994. Except for four Eredivisie clubs, all other participants entered the tournament here. In total, 56 clubs participated in the group stage, 28 advanced to the next round.

Group 1
| Team | Pld | W | D | L | GF | GA | GD | Pts |
|---|---|---|---|---|---|---|---|---|
| 1. SC Veendam _{1} | 3 | 3 | 0 | 0 | 7 | 2 | 5 | 6 |
| 2. FC Groningen _{E} | 3 | 2 | 0 | 1 | 5 | 3 | 2 | 4 |
| 3. FC Emmen _{1} | 3 | 1 | 0 | 2 | 3 | 5 | -2 | 2 |
| 4. ACV _{A} | 3 | 0 | 0 | 3 | 1 | 6 | -5 | 0 |

| FC Groningen | 1–0 | FC Emmen | Groningen |

| SC Veendam | 3–1 | FC Groningen | Veendam |

| FC Emmen | 2–1 | ACV | Emmen |

| ACV | 0–1 | SC Veendam | Assen |

| SC Veendam | 3–1 | FC Emmen | Veendam |

| ACV | 0-3 | FC Groningen | Assen |

Group 2
| Team | Pld | W | D | L | GF | GA | GD | Pts |
|---|---|---|---|---|---|---|---|---|
| 1. SC Heerenveen _{E} | 3 | 2 | 1 | 0 | 16 | 3 | 13 | 5 |
| 2. SC Cambuur _{1} | 3 | 2 | 1 | 0 | 11 | 2 | 9 | 5 |
| 3. HZVV _{A} | 3 | 1 | 0 | 2 | 3 | 15 | -12 | 2 |
| 4. DOSKO _{A} | 3 | 0 | 0 | 3 | 3 | 13 | -10 | 0 |

| DOSKO | 1–7 | SC Cambuur | Bergen op Zoom |

| SC Cambuur | 1–1 | SC Heerenveen | Leeuwarden |

| DOSKO | 1-2 | HZVV | Bergen op Zoom |

| DOSKO | 1-4 | SC Heerenveen | Bergen op Zoom |

| HZVV | 0-3 | SC Cambuur | Hoogeveen |

| SC Heerenveen | 11-1 | HZVV | Heerenveen |

Group 3
| Team | Pld | W | D | L | GF | GA | GD | Pts |
|---|---|---|---|---|---|---|---|---|
| 1. FC Twente _{E} | 3 | 3 | 0 | 0 | 15 | 2 | 13 | 6 |
| 2. Heracles Almelo _{1} | 3 | 2 | 0 | 1 | 13 | 5 | 8 | 4 |
| 3. RKVV STEVO _{A} | 3 | 1 | 0 | 2 | 6 | 13 | -7 | 2 |
| 4. SVBO _{A} | 3 | 0 | 0 | 3 | 2 | 16 | -14 | 0 |

| Heracles Almelo | 9-1 | RKVV STEVO | Almelo |

| VV SVBO | 0-9 | FC Twente | Barger-Oosterveld |

| FC Twente | 4-1 | Heracles Almelo | Enschede |

| RKVV STEVO | 4-2 | VV SVBO | Geesteren |

| VV SVBO | 0-3 | Heracles Almelo | Barger-Oosterveld |

| RKVV STEVO | 1-2 | FC Twente | Geesteren |

Group 4
| Team | Pld | W | D | L | GF | GA | GD | Pts |
|---|---|---|---|---|---|---|---|---|
| 1. Go Ahead Eagles _{E} | 3 | 3 | 0 | 0 | 12 | 4 | +8 | 6 |
| 2. Jong Ajax | 3 | 2 | 0 | 1 | 7 | 4 | +3 | 4 |
| 3. PEC Zwolle _{1} | 3 | 1 | 0 | 2 | 4 | 5 | -1 | 2 |
| 4. VV DOVO _{A} | 3 | 0 | 0 | 3 | 2 | 12 | -10 | 0 |

| PEC Zwolle | 1-2 | Go Ahead Eagles | Zwolle |

| Jong Ajax | 3-0 | VV DOVO | Amsterdam |

| PEC Zwolle | 1-2 | Jong Ajax | Zwolle |

| VV DOVO | 1-7 | Go Ahead Eagles | Veenendaal |

| Go Ahead Eagles | 3-2 | Jong Ajax | Deventer |

| VV DOVO | 1-2 | PEC Zwolle | Veenendaal |

Group 5
| Team | Pld | W | D | L | GF | GA | GD | Pts |
|---|---|---|---|---|---|---|---|---|
| 1. VVV-Venlo _{1} | 3 | 2 | 1 | 0 | 8 | 5 | +3 | 5 |
| 2. MVV Maastricht _{E} | 3 | 2 | 1 | 0 | 4 | 2 | +2 | 5 |
| 3. SV Panningen _{A} | 3 | 1 | 0 | 2 | 4 | 4 | +2 | 2 |
| 4. SV Meerssen _{A} | 3 | 0 | 0 | 3 | 3 | 10 | -7 | 0 |

| MVV Maastricht | 2-1 | SV Meerssen | Maastricht |

| SV Panningen | 2-3 | VVV-Venlo | Panningen |

| VVV-Venlo | 1-1 | MVV Maastricht | Venlo |

| SV Meerssen | 0-4 | SV Panningen | Meerssen |

| SV Panningen | 0-1 | MVV Maastricht | Panningen |

| SV Meerssen | 2-4 | VVV-Venlo | Meerssen |

Group 6
| Team | Pld | W | D | L | GF | GA | GD | Pts |
|---|---|---|---|---|---|---|---|---|
| 1. Roda JC Kerkrade _{E} | 3 | 2 | 0 | 1 | 12 | 3 | +9 | 4 |
| 2. FC Eindhoven _{1} | 3 | 2 | 0 | 1 | 10 | 7 | +3 | 4 |
| 3. Fortuna Sittard _{1} | 3 | 2 | 0 | 1 | 7 | 6 | +1 | 4 |
| 4. Nieuw Woensel _{A} | 3 | 0 | 0 | 3 | 2 | 15 | -13 | 0 |

| Fortuna Sittard | 2-1 | Roda JC Kerkrade | Sittard-Geleen |

| FC Eindhoven | 5-1 | Nieuw Woensel | Eindhoven |

| Nieuw Woensel | 1-4 | Fortuna Sittard | Eindhoven |

| Roda JC Kerkrade | 5-1 | FC Eindhoven | Kerkrade |

| FC Eindhoven | 4-1 | Fortuna Sittard | Eindhoven |

| Roda JC Kerkrade | 6-0 | Nieuw Woensel | Kerkrade |

Group 7
| Team | Pld | W | D | L | GF | GA | GD | Pts |
|---|---|---|---|---|---|---|---|---|
| 1. Willem II Tilburg _{E} | 3 | 3 | 0 | 0 | 17 | 0 | +17 | 6 |
| 2. Helmond Sport _{1} | 3 | 2 | 0 | 1 | 16 | 3 | +13 | 4 |
| 3. Young RBC | 3 | 1 | 0 | 2 | 5 | 14 | -11 | 2 |
| 4. T.S.V. LONGA _{A} | 3 | 0 | 0 | 3 | 4 | 25 | -21 | 0 |

| Helmond Sport | 7-0 | Young RBC | Helmond |

| T.S.V. LONGA | 0-11 | Willem II Tilburg | Tilburg |

| Young RBC | 5-3 | T.S.V. LONGA | Roosendaal |

| Willem II Tilburg | 2-0 | Helmond Sport | Tilburg |

| Helmond Sport | 9-1 | T.S.V. LONGA | Helmond |

| Willem II Tilburg | 4-0 | Young RBC | Tilburg |

Group 8
| Team | Pld | W | D | L | GF | GA | GD | Pts |
|---|---|---|---|---|---|---|---|---|
| 1. RBC Roosendaal _{1} | 3 | 2 | 1 | 0 | 7 | 4 | +3 | 5 |
| 2. NAC Breda _{E} | 3 | 2 | 0 | 1 | 15 | 5 | +10 | 4 |
| 3. VV Baronie _{A} | 3 | 1 | 0 | 2 | 6 | 9 | -3 | 2 |
| 4. HSV Hoek _{A} | 3 | 0 | 1 | 2 | 3 | 13 | -10 | 1 |

| RBC Roosendaal | 1-1 | HSV Hoek | Roosendaal |

| VV Baronie | 2-4 | NAC Breda | Breda |

| NAC Breda | 2-3 | RBC Roosendaal | Breda |

| HSV Hoek | 2-3 | VV Baronie | Hoek |

| HSV Hoek | 0-9 | NAC Breda | Hoek |

| VV Baronie | 1-3 | RBC Roosendaal | Breda |

Group 9
| Team | Pld | W | D | L | GF | GA | GD | Pts |
|---|---|---|---|---|---|---|---|---|
| 1. De Graafschap _{1} | 3 | 2 | 0 | 1 | 11 | 6 | +5 | 4 |
| 2. NEC Nijmegen _{E} | 3 | 2 | 0 | 1 | 11 | 8 | +3 | 4 |
| 3. TOP Oss _{1} | 3 | 2 | 0 | 1 | 8 | 5 | +5 | 4 |
| 4. SV Babberich _{A} | 3 | 0 | 0 | 3 | 3 | 14 | -11 | 0 |

| SV Babberich | 1-5 | De Graafschap | Babberich |

| TOP Oss | 5-0 | NEC Nijmegen | Oss |

| SV Babberich | 1-3 | TOP Oss | Babberich |

| NEC Nijmegen | 5-2 | De Graafschap | Nijmegen |

| De Graafschap | 4-0 | TOP Oss | Doetinchem |

| NEC Nijmegen | 6-1 | SV Babberich | Nijmegen |

Group 10
| Team | Pld | W | D | L | GF | GA | GD | Pts |
|---|---|---|---|---|---|---|---|---|
| 1. RKC Waalwijk _{E} | 3 | 2 | 1 | 0 | 13 | 3 | +10 | 5 |
| 2. FC Den Bosch _{1} | 3 | 2 | 1 | 0 | 11 | 6 | +5 | 5 |
| 3. VV Katwijk _{A} | 3 | 1 | 0 | 2 | 6 | 14 | -8 | 2 |
| 4. Quick Boys _{A} | 3 | 0 | 0 | 3 | 4 | 11 | -7 | 0 |

| RKC Waalwijk | 8-0 | VV Katwijk | Waalwijk |

| FC Den Bosch | 5-1 | Quick Boys | 's-Hertogenbosch |

| VV Katwijk | 3-4 | FC Den Bosch | Katwijk |

| Quick Boys | 1-3 | RKC Waalwijk | Katwijk aan Zee |

| Quick Boys | 2-3 | RKC Waalwijk | Katwijk aan Zee |

| RKC Waalwijk | 2-2 | FC Den Bosch | Waalwijk |

Group 11
| Team | Pld | W | D | L | GF | GA | GD | Pts |
|---|---|---|---|---|---|---|---|---|
| 1. FC Volendam _{E} | 3 | 2 | 1 | 0 | 11 | 3 | +8 | 5 |
| 2. AZ Alkmaar _{1} | 3 | 2 | 1 | 0 | 7 | 2 | +5 | 5 |
| 3. HVV Hollandia _{A} | 3 | 1 | 0 | 2 | 5 | 10 | -5 | 2 |
| 4. ADO '20 _{A} | 3 | 0 | 0 | 3 | 5 | 13 | -8 | 0 |

| HVV Hollandia | 0-3 | AZ Alkmaar | Hoorn |

| FC Volendam | 6-1 | ADO '20 | Volendam |

| AZ Alkmaar | 1-1 | FC Volendam | Alkmaar |

| ADO '20 | 3-4 | HVV Hollandia | Heemskerk |

| HVV Hollandia | 1-4 | FC Volendam | Hoorn |

| ADO '20 | 1-3 | AZ Alkmaar | Heemskerk |

Group 12
| Team | Pld | W | D | L | GF | GA | GD | Pts |
|---|---|---|---|---|---|---|---|---|
| 1. SC Telstar _{1} | 3 | 3 | 0 | 0 | 5 | 1 | +4 | 6 |
| 2. FC Utrecht _{E} | 3 | 2 | 0 | 1 | 5 | 5 | 0 | 4 |
| 3. HFC Haarlem _{1} | 3 | 1 | 0 | 2 | 4 | 4 | 0 | 2 |
| 4. USV Holland _{A} | 3 | 0 | 0 | 3 | 4 | 8 | -4 | 0 |

| SC Telstar | 2-0 | FC Utrecht | Velsen-Zuid |

| HFC Haarlem | 3-1 | USV Holland | Haarlem |

| FC Utrecht | 2-1 | HFC Haarlem | Utrecht |

| USV Holland | 1-2 | SC Telstar | Utrecht |

| SC Telstar | 1-0 | HFC Haarlem | Velsen-Zuid |

| USV Holland | 2-3 | FC Utrecht | Utrecht |

Group 13
| Team | Pld | W | D | L | GF | GA | GD | Pts |
|---|---|---|---|---|---|---|---|---|
| 1. ADO Den Haag _{1} | 3 | 1 | 2 | 0 | 6 | 3 | +3 | 4 |
| 2. FC Dordrecht _{E} | 3 | 1 | 1 | 1 | 10 | 6 | +4 | 4 |
| 3. ADO '20 _{A} | 3 | 1 | 1 | 1 | 4 | 2 | +2 | 3 |
| 4. VSV TONEGIDO _{A} | 3 | 1 | 0 | 2 | 2 | 11 | 2 | |

| ADO '20 | 3-0 | FC Dordrecht | Heemskerk |

| VSV TONEGIDO | 0-3 | ADO Den Haag | Voorburg |

| FC Dordrecht | 2-2 | ADO Den Haag | Dordrecht |

| VSV TONEGIDO | 1-0 | ADO '20 | Voorburg |

| ADO '20 | 1-1 | ADO Den Haag | Heemskerk |

| VSV TONEGIDO | 1-8 | FC Dordrecht | Voorburg |

Group 14
| Team | Pld | W | D | L | GF | GA | GD | Pts |
|---|---|---|---|---|---|---|---|---|
| 1. Sparta Rotterdam _{E} | 3 | 3 | 0 | 0 | 13 | 2 | +11 | 6 |
| 2. Excelsior Rotterdam _{1} | 3 | 1 | 1 | 1 | 4 | 8 | -4 | 3 |
| 3. FC Lisse _{A} | 3 | 1 | 0 | 2 | 3 | 4 | -1 | 2 |
| 4. VV Rozenburg _{A} | 3 | 0 | 1 | 2 | 1 | 7 | -6 | 1 |

| VV Rozenburg | 0-4 | Sparta Rotterdam |

| Excelsior Rotterdam | 2-0 | FC Lisse | Rotterdam |

| Sparta Rotterdam | 7-1 | Excelsior Rotterdam | Rotterdam |

| FC Lisse | 2-0 | VV Rozenburg | Lisse |

| VV Rozenburg | 1-1 | Excelsior Rotterdam |

| FC Lisse | 1-2 | Sparta Rotterdam | Lisse |

_{E} Eredivisie; _{1} Eerste Divisie; _{A} Amateur teams

== Knock-out Stage ==
=== First round ===
The matches of the first knock-out round were played on October 5, 1994. The four highest ranked Eredivisie teams from the Eredivisie 1993-1994 season entered the tournament in this round.

| Home team | Result | Away team |
|---|---|---|
| AZ | 2–0 | VVV-Venlo |
| FC Twente | 2–0 | RKC Waalwijk |
| Helmond Sport | 1–4 | Sparta |
| De Graafschap | 1–2 | FC Utrecht |
| FC Groningen | 1–2 | Feyenoord _{E} |
| Telstar | 1–1 (p) | NAC Breda |
| Dordrecht'90 | 1–0 | MVV |
| Excelsior | 0–3 | Young Ajax |

| Home team | Result | Away team |
|---|---|---|
| Willem II | 5–1 | FC Eindhoven |
| NEC | 4–2 | Go Ahead Eagles |
| PSV _{E} | 3–2 (aet) | Roda JC |
| sc Heerenveen | 3–2 (aet) | Cambuur Leeuwarden |
| FC Volendam | 3–2 | Vitesse Arnhem _{E} |
| Ajax _{E} | 3–1 | FC Den Bosch |
| RBC | 2–3 | ADO Den Haag |
| SC Heracles | 2–1 | Veendam |

_{E} four Eredivisie entrants

=== Round of 16 ===
The matches of the round of 16 were later played on November 30, 1994.

| Home team | Result | Away team |
|---|---|---|
| FC Utrecht | 3–1 | FC Twente |
| FC Volendam | 3–0 | AZ |
| SC Heracles | 2–1 (aet) | Sparta |
| Young Ajax | 2–0 | Dordrecht'90 |
| Willem II | 1–1 (p) | Feyenoord |
| NEC | 0–3 | Ajax |
| ADO Den Haag | 0–2 | NAC Breda |
| PSV | 0–1 | sc Heerenveen |

=== Quarter finals ===
The quarter finals were played the following year, on February 24, February 25, and March 8, 1995.

| Home team | Result | Away team |
|---|---|---|
| sc Heerenveen | 3–2 (aet) | NAC Breda |
| SC Heracles | 0–1 | FC Volendam |
| Young Ajax | 1–2 | FC Utrecht |
| Ajax | 1–2 (aet) | Feyenoord |

=== Semi-finals ===
The semi-finals were played on March 22, 1995.

| Home team | Result | Away team |
|---|---|---|
| FC Utrecht | 0–1 | FC Volendam |
| sc Heerenveen | 0–1 | Feyenoord |

=== Final ===
25 May 1995
18:00

| Feyenoord | 2–1 | Volendam |
|---|---|---|
| Taument 7'; Obiku 82' | | Wasiman 47' |

De Kuip, Rotterdam
Attendance: 48,146
Referee: Jaap Uilenberg

Feyenoord would participate in the 1995-1996 UEFA Cup Winners' Cup.
