= 1995–96 KNVB Cup =

Tournament details
- Country: Netherlands
- Teams: 60

Final positions
- Champions: PSV
- Runners-up: Sparta

Tournament statistics
- Top goal scorer(s): Virgil Breetveld (8 goals)

The 1995–96 KNVB Cup (at the time called Amstel Cup) was the 78th edition of the Dutch national football annual knockout tournament for the KNVB Cup. 60 teams contested, beginning on 12 August 1995 and at the final on 16 May 1996.

PSV beat Sparta 5–2 and won the cup for the seventh time.

== Teams ==
- All 18 participants of the 1995–96 Eredivisie. Four teams, who were in the top four last season, entered directly into the knockout stage.
- All 18 participants of the 1995–96 Eerste Divisie.
- 22 teams from lower (amateur) leagues.
- Two youth teams.

== Group stage ==
The matches of the group stage were played between 12 August and 16 September 1995. 56 clubs participated, 28 advanced to the next round.

Group 1
| Team | Pld | W | D | L | GF | GA | GD | Pts |
|---|---|---|---|---|---|---|---|---|
| 1. FC Groningen _{E} | 3 | 3 | 0 | 0 | 12 | 5 | +7 | 9 |
| 2. SC Cambuur _{1} | 3 | 2 | 0 | 1 | 7 | 5 | +2 | 6 |
| 3. SC Veendam _{1} | 3 | 1 | 0 | 2 | 5 | 6 | -1 | 3 |
| 4. VV Appingedam _{A} | 3 | 0 | 0 | 3 | 2 | 10 | -8 | 0 |

| FC Groningen | 4-1 | SC Veendam | Groningen |

| VV Appingedam | 1-2 | SC Cambuur | Appingedam |

| VV Appingedam | 1-4 | FC Groningen | Appingedam |

| SC Veendam | 0-2 | SC Cambuur | Groningen |

| SC Veendam | 4-0 | VV Appingedam | Groningen |

| SC Cambuur | 3-4 | FC Groningen | Leeuwarden |

Group 2
| Team | Pld | W | D | L | GF | GA | GD | Pts |
|---|---|---|---|---|---|---|---|---|
| 1. Heracles Almelo _{1} | 3 | 3 | 0 | 0 | 9 | 2 | +7 | 9 |
| 2. SC Heerenveen _{E} | 3 | 1 | 1 | 1 | 3 | 3 | 0 | 4 |
| 3. SV Urk _{A} | 3 | 0 | 2 | 1 | 4 | 7 | -3 | 2 |
| 4. FC Emmen _{1} | 3 | 0 | 1 | 2 | 4 | 8 | -4 | 1 |

| SC Heerenveen | 2-1 | FC Emmen | Heerenveen |

| SV Urk | 1-4 | Heracles Almelo | Urk |

| FC Emmen | 1-4 | Heracles Almelo | Emmen |

| Heracles Almelo | 1-0 | SC Heerenveen | Almelo |

| FC Emmen | 2-2 | SV Urk | Emmen |

| SV Urk | 1-1 | SC Heerenveen | Urk |

Group 3
| Team | Pld | W | D | L | GF | GA | GD | Pts |
|---|---|---|---|---|---|---|---|---|
| 1. FC Twente _{E} | 3 | 3 | 0 | 0 | 12 | 1 | +11 | 9 |
| 2. PEC Zwolle _{1} | 3 | 2 | 0 | 1 | 11 | 7 | +4 | 6 |
| 3. RKVV STEVO _{A} | 3 | 1 | 0 | 2 | 4 | 9 | -5 | 3 |
| 4. Sportclub Enschede _{A} | 3 | 0 | 0 | 3 | 2 | 12 | -10 | 0 |

| FC Twente | 5-1 | PEC Zwolle | Enschede |

| RKVV STEVO | 0-4 | FC Twente | Geesteren |

| PEC Zwolle | 6-1 | Sportclub Enschede | Zwolle |

| Sportclub Enschede | 1-3 | RKVV STEVO | Enschede |

| FC Twente | 3-0 | Sportclub Enschede | Enschede |

| RKVV STEVO | 1-4 | PEC Zwolle | Geesteren |

Group 4
| Team | Pld | W | D | L | GF | GA | GD | Pts |
|---|---|---|---|---|---|---|---|---|
| 1. Go Ahead Eagles _{E} | 3 | 3 | 0 | 0 | 12 | 5 | +7 | 9 |
| 2. TOP Oss _{1} | 3 | 1 | 1 | 1 | 8 | 8 | 0 | 4 |
| 3. IJsselmeervogels _{A} | 3 | 1 | 1 | 1 | 2 | 3 | -1 | 4 |
| 4. GVVV _{A} | 3 | 0 | 0 | 3 | 5 | 11 | -6 | 0 |

| Go Ahead Eagles | 5-2 | TOP Oss | Deventer |

| TOP Oss | 5-2 | GVVV | Oss |

| IJsselmeervogels | 0-2 | Go Ahead Eagles | IJsselmeer |

| GVVV | 0-1 | IJsselmeervogels | Veenendaal |

| GVVV | 3-5 | Go Ahead Eagles | Veenendaal |

| TOP Oss | 1-1 | IJsselmeervogels | Oss |

Group 5
| Team | Pld | W | D | L | GF | GA | GD | Pts |
|---|---|---|---|---|---|---|---|---|
| 1. MVV Maastricht _{1} | 3 | 3 | 0 | 0 | 10 | 5 | +5 | 9 |
| 2. Fortuna Sittard _{E} | 3 | 1 | 1 | 1 | 10 | 4 | +6 | 4 |
| 3. SV Panningen _{A} | 3 | 0 | 2 | 1 | 6 | 7 | -1 | 2 |
| 4. Wilhelmina '08 _{A} | 3 | 0 | 1 | 2 | 2 | 12 | -10 | 1 |

| MVV Maastricht | 3-0 | Fortuna Sittard | Maastricht |

| SV Panningen | 4-5 | MVV Maastricht | Panningen |

| Fortuna Sittard | 9-0 | Wilhelmina '08 | Sittard-Geleen |

| Wilhelmina '08 | 1-2 | MVV Maastricht | Weert |

| SV Panningen | 1-1 | Fortuna Sittard | Panningen |

| Wilhelmina '08 | 1-1 | SV Panningen | Weert |

Group 6
| Team | Pld | W | D | L | GF | GA | GD | Pts |
|---|---|---|---|---|---|---|---|---|
| 1. Willem II _{E} | 3 | 3 | 0 | 0 | 12 | 1 | +11 | 9 |
| 2. VVV-Venlo _{1} | 3 | 1 | 1 | 1 | 5 | 2 | +3 | 4 |
| 3. FC Eindhoven _{1} | 3 | 1 | 1 | 1 | 6 | 7 | -1 | 4 |
| 4. SV TOP _{A} | 3 | 0 | 0 | 3 | 3 | 16 | -13 | 0 |

| Willem II | 1-0 | VVV-Venlo | Tilburg |

| SV TOP | 0-6 | Willem II | Oss |

| VVV-Venlo | 0-0 | FC Eindhoven | Venlo |

| SV TOP | 1-5 | VVV-Venlo | Oss |

| FC Eindhoven | 1-5 | Willem II | Eindhoven |

| FC Eindhoven | 5-2 | SV TOP | Eindhoven |

Group 7
| Team | Pts |
|---|---|
| 1. De Graafschap _{E} | 9 |
| 2. Helmond Sport _{1} | 6 |
| 3. De Treffers _{A} | 3 |
| 4. RKVV Volharding _{A} | 0 |

Group 8
| Team | Pts |
|---|---|
| 1. NAC Breda _{E} | 9 |
| 2. Young Sparta | 6 |
| 3. VV Baronie _{A} | 3 |
| 4. Excelsior _{1} | 0 |

Group 9
| Team | Pts |
|---|---|
| 1. RKC Waalwijk _{E} | 7 |
| 2. RBC _{1} | 5 |
| 3. HSV Hoek _{A} | 4 |
| 4. RKSV Halsteren _{A} | 0 |

Group 10
| Team | Pts |
|---|---|
| 1. FC Utrecht _{E} | 9 |
| 2. ADO Den Haag _{1} | 6 |
| 3. Kozakken Boys _{A} | 1 |
| 4. VIOS _{A} | 1 |

Group 11
| Team | Pts |
|---|---|
| 1. Vitesse Arnhem _{E} | 7 |
| 2. Dordrecht'90 _{1} | 4 |
| 3. Young Ajax | 3 |
| 4. HVV Hollandia _{A} | 1 |

Group 12
| Team | Pts |
|---|---|
| 1. NEC _{E} | 7 |
| 2. FC Den Bosch _{1} | 6 |
| 3. USV Holland _{A} | 3 |
| 4. SV Argon _{A} | 1 |

Group 13
| Team | Pts |
|---|---|
| 1. Sparta _{E} | 9 |
| 2. Telstar _{1} | 6 |
| 3. FC Lisse _{A} | 1 |
| 4. VV Katwijk _{A} | 1 |

Group 14
| Team | Pts |
|---|---|
| 1. AZ _{1} | 7 |
| 2. HFC Haarlem _{1} | 4 |
| 3. FC Volendam _{E} | 3 |
| 4. AFC '34 _{A} | 1 |

_{E} Eredivisie; _{1} Eerste Divisie; _{A} Amateur teams

== Knock-out Stage ==
=== First round ===
The matches of the first knock-out round were played on November 28, 29 and 30, 1995. The four highest ranked Eredivisie clubs from last season entered the tournament this round.

| Home team | Result | Away team |
|---|---|---|
| Feyenoord _{E} | 3–0 | RBC |
| Cambuur Leeuwarden | 1–0 (aet) | sc Heerenveen |
| Sparta | 3–1 | FC Den Bosch |
| Roda JC _{E} | 2–1 | FC Groningen |
| TOP Oss | 1–2 | FC Zwolle |
| Go Ahead Eagles | 1–1 | Fortuna Sittard |
| SC Heracles | 0–3 | Ajax _{E} (on January 24) |
| Young Sparta | 0–2 | De Graafschap |

| Home team | Result | Away team |
|---|---|---|
| Helmond Sport | (p) 3-3 | Dordrecht'90 |
| FC Utrecht | 0–2 | PSV _{E} |
| MVV | (p) 0-0 | Willem II |
| ADO Den Haag | 1–0 (aet) | Vitesse Arnhem |
| NAC Breda | 4–1 | Telstar |
| NEC | 0–0 (p) | AZ |
| FC Twente | 2–0 | HFC Haarlem |
| VVV-Venlo | 2–0 | RKC Waalwijk |

_{E} four Eredivisie entrants

=== Round of 16 ===
The matches of the round of 16 were played on January 24, 1996.

| Home team | Result | Away team |
|---|---|---|
| Feyenoord | 1–0 | NAC Breda |
| VVV-Venlo | (p) 0-0 | Fortuna Sittard |
| Roda JC | (p) 1-1 | FC Zwolle |
| ADO Den Haag | 1–2 | FC Twente |
| De Graafschap | 1–3 | PSV |
| Helmond Sport | 1–2 | MVV |
| AZ | 0–1 | Sparta |
| Cambuur Leeuwarden | 2–0 | Ajax (on January 30) |

=== Quarter finals ===
The quarter finals were played on February 28, 1996.

| Home team | Result | Away team |
|---|---|---|
| VVV-Venlo | 0–2 | Roda JC |
| Sparta | 1–0 | Cambuur Leeuwarden |
| MVV | 1–2 | Feyenoord |
| FC Twente | 1–3 | PSV |

=== Semi-finals ===
The semi-finals were played on April 6, 1996.

| Home team | Result | Away team |
|---|---|---|
| PSV | 3–1 | Roda JC |
| Sparta | 1–0 (aet) | Feyenoord |

=== Final ===
16 May 1996

| PSV | 5–2 | Sparta |
|---|---|---|
| Cocu 7'; Vink 14'; Veldman 65' (o.g.); Jonk 87'; Van der Doelen 90' | | Van der Meer 45'; De Nooijer 79' (pen.) |

De Kuip, Rotterdam
Attendance: 35,000
Referee: Mario van der Ende

PSV would participate in the Cup Winners' Cup
