= 1994–95 Eerste Divisie =

39th season of the second-tier football league in Netherlands

Eerste Divisie
- Season: 1994–95
- Champions: Fortuna Sittard
- Promoted: Fortuna Sittard; De Graafschap
- Goals: 983
- Average goals/game: 3.21

The Dutch Eerste Divisie in the 1994–95 season was contested by 18 teams. Fortuna Sittard won the championship.

== New entrants ==
Relegated from the Eredivisie 1993–94

- Cambuur Leeuwarden
- VVV-Venlo

== League standings ==
Pos	Team	Pld	W	D	L	GF	GA	GD	Pts	Promotion or qualification
1	Fortuna Sittard	34	23	5	6	72	27	+45	51	Promotion to Eredivisie
2	De Graafschap	34	21	8	5	70	45	+25	50	Play-offs
3	Excelsior	34	18	8	8	71	49	+22	44	Play-offs
4	ADO Den Haag	34	16	8	10	71	52	+19	40	Play-offs
5	AZ	34	16	7	11	59	40	+19	39	Play-offs
6	SC Heracles	34	16	7	11	62	46	+16	39	Play-offs
7	Cambuur Leeuwarden	34	14	11	9	50	43	+7	39	
8	Veendam	34	16	6	12	54	41	+13	38	
9	TOP Oss	34	14	10	10	59	47	+12	38	
10	FC Emmen	34	13	9	12	56	61	−5	35	
11	Telstar	34	11	8	15	49	59	−10	30	
12	VVV-Venlo	34	10	9	15	54	62	−8	29	Play-offs
13	Helmond Sport	34	11	7	16	57	67	−10	29	
14	FC Zwolle	34	10	8	16	36	59	−23	28	
15	RBC	34	10	7	17	39	48	−9	27	
16	HFC Haarlem	34	8	8	18	50	69	−19	24	
17	FC Eindhoven	34	8	4	22	35	78	−43	20	
18	FC Den Bosch	34	4	4	26	39	90	−51	12	

Source: rsssf.com

== Promotion/relegation play-offs ==
In the promotion/relegation competition, eight entrants (six from this league and two from the Eredivisie) entered in two groups. The group winners were promoted to the Eredivisie.

Group 1
Pos	Team	Pld	W	D	L	GF	GA	GD	Pts	Promotion or relegation
1	De Graafschap	6	4	1	1	12	8	+4	9	Promotion to Eredivisie
2	ADO Den Haag	6	4	0	2	11	6	+5	8	
3	SC Heracles	6	2	1	3	8	15	−7	5	
4	MVV	6	0	2	4	8	15	−7	2	Relegation from Eredivisie

Source: rsssf.com

Group 2
Pos	Team	Pld	W	D	L	GF	GA	GD	Pts	Qualification
1	Go Ahead Eagles	6	5	1	0	13	6	+7	11	Remain in Eredivisie
2	Excelsior	6	3	0	3	5	7	−2	6	
3	VVV-Venlo	6	1	2	3	10	11	−1	4	
4	AZ	6	1	1	4	9	13	−4	3	

Source: rsssf.com

== Attendances ==
#	Club	Average
1	Cambuur	4,230
2	Fortuna	4,206
3	De Graafschap	4,136
4	Veendam	3,626
5	AZ	3,396
6	Zwolle	2,713
7	VVV	2,575
8	Oss	2,566
9	Emmen	2,539
10	Helmond	2,259
11	Telstar	2,222
12	ADO	2,172
13	RBC	2,078
14	Heracles	2,033
15	Haarlem	1,894
16	Eindhoven	1,712
17	Excelsior	1,550
18	Den Bosch	1,325

== See also ==
- Eredivisie 1994–95
- KNVB Cup 1994–95
