= Marnix Kolder =

Dutch footballer

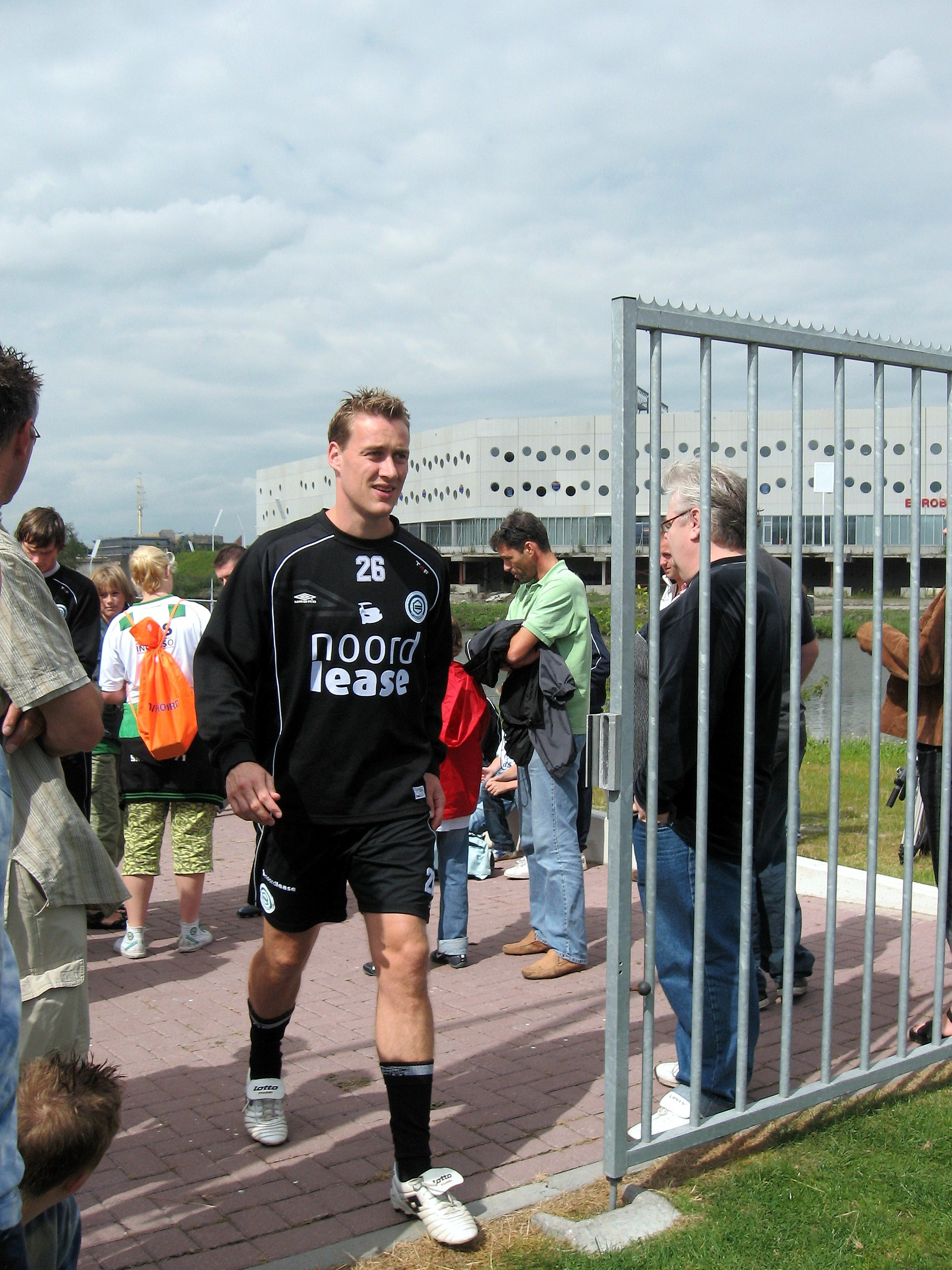
- Kolder with FC Groningen on the 'Trainingscomplex Noord-Nederland' in 2007

Personal information
- Date of birth: 31 January 1981 (age 45)
- Place of birth: Winschoten, Netherlands
- Position: Striker

Youth career
- 1987–1989: VV Bato
- 1989–1995: WVV 1896
- 1995–1997: Veendam

Senior career*
Years	Team	Apps	(Gls)
1997–2006	Veendam	269	(75)
2007–2008	Groningen	13	(0)
2008–2009	VVV-Venlo	23	(3)
2009–2011	Veendam	58	(19)
2011–2015	Go Ahead Eagles	123	(39)
2015–2016	Emmen	30	(10)
2016–2020	Veendam 1894		
- * Club domestic league appearances and goals

Marnix Kolder (born 31 January 1981) is a Dutch former professional footballer who played as a striker.

== Career ==
Born in Winschoten, Kolder progressed through the youth departments of VV Bato and WVV 1896 – both based in his hometown – before moving to the academy of BV Veendam in 1995, where he played for two years. On 4 October 1997, at the age of sixteen, he made his professional debut in the first team of Veendam in a 4–3 win in the Eerste Divisie over ADO Den Haag. He came on as a substitute in the 66th minute for Bert Stokkingreef. He played nine and a half seasons for the club, after which he moved to FC Groningen in 2007, where he would make his debut in the Eredivisie. On 20 September 2007, Kolder made his European debut when Groningen played against Fiorentina, coming on in the 90th minute for Erik Nevland.

After Kolder moved to VVV-Venlo in 2008, he also experienced promotion to the Eredivisie. On 10 August 2013, after having scored 126 goals in the Eerste Divisie, he scored his first goal in the Eredivisie, when he played against ADO Den Haag with his new team, Go Ahead Eagles. On 7 June 2015, it was announced that Kolder had signed with FC Emmen.

From the 2016–17 season, Kolder began playing at amateur level for Veendam 1894. After the 2019–20 season he retired.

== Retirement ==
After professional football, Kolder started a career in 2016 as an intern and as an outpatient counselor at Bureau Ineke Keizer in Veendam. Since 2017, he has been following a higher vocational education study in social pedagogical care at the Leidse Onderwijsinstellingen (LOI). Since 2017, he has been a counselor at Veni Etinam in Veendam. He has also been a pundit for FC Groningen at the Dagblad van het Noorden since 2017.

== Honours ==
VVV-Venlo

- Eerste Divisie: 2008–09
