= Dick de Boer =

Dutch football manager

Personal information
- Date of birth: 28 December 1948 (age 77)
- Place of birth: Volendam, Netherlands

Managerial career
- Years: Team
- 1989–1996: AFC '34
- 1996–1997: Volendam (assistant)
- 1997–1998: Volendam
- 1999–2003: Utrecht (academy manager)
- 2003–2004: Cambuur
- 2004: Zimbabwe
- 2005-2006: AFC '34
- 2006–2007: Vitesse (assistant)
- 2008–2009: Spakenburg
- 2009–2010: Hellas Sport Combinatie (technical director)
- 2010–2011: Saint-Éloi Lupopo
- 2011–2012: Almere City
- 2012–2013: Almere City (director of football)

Dick de Boer (born 28 December 1948) is a Dutch football manager.
