= 1994–95 Eredivisie =

39th season of the Eredivisie

Eredivisie
- Season: 1994–95
- Champions: Ajax (25th title)
- Promoted: NEC; Dordrecht'90
- Relegated: MVV; Dordrecht'90
- Champions League: Ajax
- Cup Winners' Cup: Feyenoord
- UEFA Cup: Roda JC; PSV
- Intertoto Cup: sc Heerenveen; FC Groningen
- Goals: 981
- Average goals/game: 3.20
- Top goalscorer: (Brazil) Ronaldo; PSV 30 goals

The Dutch Eredivisie in the 1994–95 season was contested by 18 teams. Ajax won the championship without losing a game. Starting this season, clubs qualifying for the Intertoto Cup can play for a spot in the UEFA Cup.

This was the final season in which two points were awarded for a win; going forward this changed to three points.

== League table ==
Pos	Team	Pld	W	D	L	GF	GA	GD	Pts	Qualification or relegation
1	Ajax (C)	34	27	7	0	106	28	+78	61	Qualification to Champions League group stage
2	Roda JC	34	22	10	2	70	28	+42	54	Qualification to UEFA Cup first round
3	PSV	34	20	7	7	85	46	+39	47	Qualification to UEFA Cup first round
4	Feyenoord	34	19	5	10	66	56	+10	43 (Note: Winners KNVB Cup.)	Qualification to Cup Winners' Cup first round
5	FC Twente	34	17	8	9	66	50	+16	42	
6	Vitesse Arnhem	34	14	12	8	55	44	+11	40	
7	Willem II	34	13	8	13	44	48	−4	34	
8	RKC Waalwijk	34	11	11	12	46	49	−3	33	
9	sc Heerenveen	34	12	6	16	47	60	−13	30	Qualification to Intertoto Cup group stage
10	NAC Breda	34	11	7	16	54	60	−6	29	
11	FC Volendam	34	8	13	13	37	55	−18	29	
12	FC Utrecht	34	8	11	15	43	60	−17	27	
13	FC Groningen	34	8	10	16	49	64	−15	26	Qualification to Intertoto Cup group stage
14	Sparta Rotterdam	34	8	10	16	42	58	−16	26	
15	NEC	34	9	7	18	48	60	−12	25	
16	MVV (R)	34	7	9	18	41	71	−30	23 (Note: relegated after losing promotion/relegation play-offs.)	Qualification to Relegation play-offs
17	Go Ahead Eagles	34	7	9	18	42	77	−35	23 (Note: won and remained in the 1995–96 Eredivisie.)	Qualification to Relegation play-offs
18	Dordrecht'90 (R)	34	5	10	19	40	67	−27	20	Relegation to Eerste Divisie

Source: , RSSSF.com,
Rules for classification: 1) Points; 2) Head-to-head points; 3) Head-to-head goal difference; 4) Goal difference; 5) Goals scored; 6) Draw. (Note: Head-to-head record is used only after all the matches between the teams in question have been played).
(C) Champions; (R) Relegated

== Results ==
Home \ Away	AJX	DOR	FEY	GAE	GRO	HEE	MVV	NAC	NEC	PSV	RKC	RJC	SPA	TWE	UTR	VIT	VOL	WIL
Ajax	—	3–0	4–1	4–0	3–1	5–1	3–1	3–1	5–1	1–0	3–1	1–1	8–0	3–1	2–1	5–0	4–1	7–0
Dordrecht '90	1–3	—	1–1	1–1	0–1	1–1	1–2	2–5	1–0	0–2	0–1	0–3	3–1	1–2	1–1	0–0	5–1	3–0
Feyenoord	0–5	5–4	—	0–0	4–2	2–1	6–1	1–0	3–2	3–2	1–0	1–2	4–0	0–3	3–0	0–3	5–2	0–2
Go Ahead Eagles	1–2	1–3	2–2	—	2–4	0–4	1–1	5–1	3–2	1–1	4–2	0–4	1–1	0–2	2–4	0–0	0–2	4–2
Groningen	2–4	2–2	1–1	2–3	—	0–0	0–1	3–4	2–2	3–2	3–1	0–2	4–0	1–2	1–1	1–1	2–2	3–1
Heerenveen	3–3	1–1	0–4	0–1	2–0	—	0–4	4–3	4–2	1–2	1–0	0–0	1–0	1–4	2–0	3–0	4–0	1–0
MVV	0–3	3–3	1–4	1–1	0–1	1–0	—	2–3	1–2	2–3	2–1	1–1	0–0	0–1	3–2	2–3	1–1	3–0
NAC	2–2	1–1	1–2	3–0	1–3	2–3	2–1	—	2–0	1–2	1–2	2–4	1–3	2–1	4–0	0–0	0–1	0–0
NEC	0–2	4–0	0–1	2–1	2–1	3–0	4–0	0–1	—	2–2	1–2	3–1	1–1	0–1	2–3	0–1	0–0	2–2
PSV Eindhoven	1–4	4–0	4–1	4–1	5–0	3–1	4–0	2–4	3–0	—	2–2	5–0	4–0	3–1	4–0	3–2	1–1	3–2
RKC	1–1	4–1	2–1	2–1	3–0	1–1	1–1	2–0	1–3	2–4	—	1–1	2–2	1–0	2–1	0–0	2–3	1–1
Roda	1–1	2–0	5–0	3–2	2–1	1–0	4–0	2–0	3–1	3–0	2–0	—	1–0	1–1	1–0	5–0	2–1	3–0
Sparta Rotterdam	0–2	3–1	0–1	1–2	3–1	2–0	2–2	1–2	2–0	1–1	5–2	0–0	—	3–4	5–0	1–1	2–0	0–2
Twente	0–1	2–2	5–1	3–0	2–2	4–3	3–0	2–1	1–1	2–2	1–1	1–2	3–3	—	2–1	1–3	2–0	0–3
Utrecht	0–0	3–1	0–0	2–2	2–1	4–0	7–2	2–2	2–2	1–2	0–0	2–4	0–0	0–4	—	1–4	0–0	0–0
Vitesse	2–3	2–0	0–3	5–0	0–0	3–1	2–1	1–1	2–0	2–4	1–1	1–1	2–0	6–1	2–1	—	0–0	3–1
Volendam	2–2	1–0	0–3	3–0	1–1	1–2	1–1	1–1	5–1	0–0	0–2	3–3	1–0	0–2	0–1	3–2	—	0–0
Willem II	1–4	1–0	1–2	4–0	3–0	3–1	1–0	2–0	1–3	2–1	1–0	0–0	1–0	2–2	0–1	1–1	4–0	—

Legend: Blue = home team win; Yellow = draw; Red = away team win.

== Promotion/relegation play-offs ==
In the promotion/relegation competition, eight entrants (six from the Eerste Divisie and two from this league) entered in two groups. The group winners were promoted to (or remained in) the Eredivisie.

Group 1
Pos	Team	Pld	W	D	L	GF	GA	GD	Pts	Promotion or relegation
1	De Graafschap	6	4	1	1	12	8	+4	9	Promotion to Eredivisie
2	ADO Den Haag	6	4	0	2	11	6	+5	8	Remain in Eerste Divisie
3	SC Heracles	6	2	1	3	8	15	−7	5	Remain in Eerste Divisie
4	MVV	6	0	2	4	8	15	−7	2	Relegation to Eerste Divisie

Source: rsssf.com

Group 2
Pos	Team	Pld	W	D	L	GF	GA	GD	Pts	Qualification
1	Go Ahead Eagles	6	5	1	0	13	6	+7	11	Remain in Eredivisie
2	Excelsior	6	3	0	3	5	7	−2	6	Remain in Eerste Divisie
3	VVV-Venlo	6	1	2	3	10	11	−1	4	Remain in Eerste Divisie
4	AZ	6	1	1	4	9	13	−4	3	Remain in Eerste Divisie

Source: rsssf.com

== Attendances ==
No.	Club	Average	Change	Highest
1	Feyenoord	28,249	14,3%	40,000
2	PSV	25,653	-0,4%	29,500
3	AFC Ajax	23,587	1,1%	42,000
4	sc Heerenveen	12,665	-0,1%	13,500
5	FC Groningen	12,346	8,6%	16,280
6	NAC Breda	10,321	1,9%	10,850
7	Roda JC	9,088	27,3%	16,000
8	Willem II	7,893	2,3%	13,500
9	FC Twente	7,876	21,5%	13,500
10	FC Utrecht	7,309	25,8%	14,000
11	SBV Vitesse	6,997	2,4%	11,800
12	MVV Maastricht	6,485	8,6%	11,000
13	Go Ahead Eagles	6,190	-6,4%	10,500
14	NEC	5,668	142,3%	21,000
15	Sparta Rotterdam	4,909	10,1%	13,000
16	FC Volendam	3,832	-20,6%	9,000
17	RKC Waalwijk	3,000	-0,2%	6,500
18	Dordrecht '90	2,921	28,3%	9,000

== See also ==
- 1994–95 Eerste Divisie
- 1994–95 KNVB Cup
