= FC Volendam =

Dutch football club

- Full name: Football Club Volendam
- Nicknames: Palingboeren; Wijdbroeken; Het Andere Oranje; Het Nieuwe Oranje (The Other Oranje)
- Founded: 1977; 49 years ago
- Ground: Kras Stadion
- Capacity: 6,984
- Chairman: Cees Driebergen
- Head coach: Erwin van de Looi
- League: Eerste Divisie
- 2025–26: Eredivisie, 16th of 18 (relegated via play-offs)
- Website: fcvolendam.nl
Home colours	Away colours

Football Club Volendam (Dutch pronunciation: [ˌvoːlə(n)ˈdɑm]) is a professional football club based in Volendam, Netherlands. They play in the Eerste Divisie, the second tier of Dutch football, following relegation from the Eredivisie in the 2025–26 season. Nicknamed "de Palingboeren", the club was founded as Victoria in 1920, changed its name to RKSV Volendam in 1923 and emerged as an exclusively professional club, FC Volendam, in 1977, following a split from its parent club. The team plays its home matches in the 6,984-capacity Kras Stadion, where it has been based since 1975.

The club has a reputation as the heen-en-weer club ("the back-and-forth club") due to its numerous promotions and relegations between the first and second tiers of Dutch football. They have achieved eleven promotions to the Eredivisie; a record. The botter (a fishing boat - Volendam is a fishing village) with which the players are honored on the occasion of promotion is called the Heen en Weer and is number XI due to the most recent promotion in 2025. Volendam also reached two KNVB Cup finals: in 1957–58 and 1994–95. Both resulted in losses to Rotterdam-based clubs: Sparta and Feyenoord, respectively.

== History ==
=== Beginnings (1920–1955) ===
Football Club Volendam was founded as Victoria on 1 June 1920 by local fishermen. By 1923, the club was renamed to RKSV Volendam, simply known as Volendam and its official orange colours were established after having been red and black the previous years. Being from the piously catholic village of Volendam, the club soon joined the Roomsch-Katholieke Federatie (RKF) ("Catholic Football Association") of the Netherlands. In 1935 and 1938, Volendam won that competition until, in 1940 as part of the Second World War, the RKF was forced by the German occupation to merge into the Royal Dutch Football Association (KNVB). After the Second World War, Volendam played in the Tweede Klasse for a long time, despite being close to promotion several times. Professionalism was introduced in the Netherlands in 1954 and as a result, Volendam saw many players leave. For example, Alkmaar '54 signed the brothers Klaas, Evert and Thoom Smit from the club.

=== Professionalism (1955–1969) ===
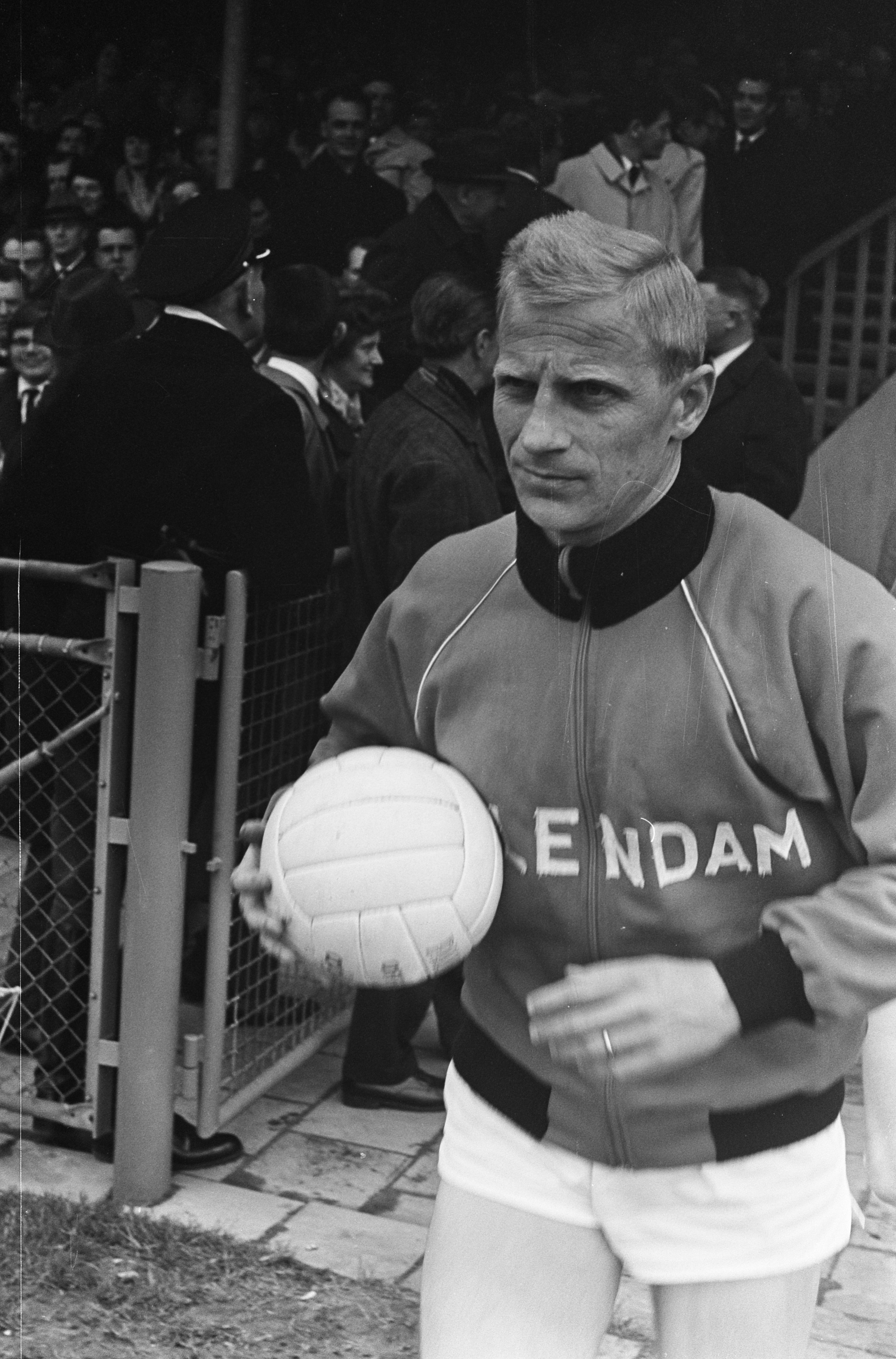
Dick Tol in 1967, his final year in Volendam. He is the club's all-time top scorer.

A year later, in 1955, Volendam also entered professional football by means of the issue of bonds. Volendam ended its first season in third place and thus qualified for the first season of the second-tier Eerste Divisie; 1956–57. In the 1958–58 KNVB Cup, Volendam reached the final by beating MVV 1–3 in the semi-final. Sparta, however, proved too strong there, and Volendam finished runners-up. The following season, Volendam became champions in the Eerste Divisie A and thus promoted to the top-tier Eredivisie for the first time in club history. However, the euphoria was short-lived, and after one season at the highest level, the club suffered relegation again. Soon, the club had established its reputation as the Heen-en-weer club ("the back-and-forth club") due to its numerous promotions and relegations between the first and second tiers of Dutch football. Head coach Bram Appel piloted Volendam back to the Eredivisie within one season, honouring the club's new nickname. This time, however, the stay at the highest level was longer than one season. Striker Dick Tol, who would become the club's all-time top goalscorer, became the top goalscorer of the 1961–62 Eredivisie with 27 goals. After three seasons in the Eredivisie, the club once again suffered relegation in the 1963–64 season. The third promotion for Volendam took place in 1967 under the English manager Ron Dellow. That season also marked Dick Tol's final season before retiring, as he became top goalscorer of the Eerste Divisie.

=== 1970s and 1980s ===
History was written in FC Volendam history in December 1971. The Portuguese Walter Ferreira signed a one-and-a-half-year contract with the club, making him their first foreign player. Despite this, Volendam suffered relegated to the Eerste Divisie in that season. The following season, 1972–73, in which Ferreira became club top scorer with 11 goals, Volendam narrowly missed out on promotion to the highest level. In the deciding match against De Graafschap, a draw was enough, but the club lost 1–0. Volendam then played in the Eerste Divisie for the first time for more than three consecutive seasons. Only in 1976–77 promotion was again achieved after play-offs. The club then split into a professional club, FC Volendam, and an amateur club RKAV Volendam in July 1977, marking the birth of the club known as Volendam today. After seventh and seventeenth places, respectively, in 1977–78 and 1978–79, the club relegated again. In 1982, Fritz Korbach was appointed as head coach. He was Volendam's first German manager and had previously successfully led FC Wageningen and PEC Zwolle to the Eredivisie. This turned out to be a perfect move, as he also led Volendam to the highest level in the 1982–83 season. As their former stay in the Eredivisie, they last two seasons before suffering another relegation. Under the guidance of new head coach Jan Brouwer, Volendam again became champions of the Eerste Divisie in the 1986–87 season and thus promoted back to the Eredivisie. In the autumn, an ambitious plan ensured Volendam salvation from financial ruin, which had threatened the club's existence for some years.

Throughout the years, Volendam has spawned potential players, such as Wim Jonk, Edwin Zoetebier, Arnold and Gerrie Mühren. The club also has scouted youth system, which spreads across different countries.

=== Golden years (1987–1997) ===
In the 1989–90 Eredivisie season, Volendam achieved its best result ever by sixth in the table with 39 points. Three seasons later, the feat was repeated and sixth place was achieved once again. In 1995, FC Volendam reached the final of the KNVB Cup for the second time. This time, the opponent was Feyenoord at their home ground, De Kuip on 25 May. Volendam lost the match 2–1 after conceding goals by Gaston Taument and Michael Obiku. André Wasiman scored the sole goal for FC Volendam. Among the 7,000 travelling away fans from Volendam in De Kuip at that time were also Kees Kwakman and Jack Tuijp, who would later both make more than 100 appearances for FC Volendam themselves. For the first time in many years, Volendam managed stay in the Eredivisie for a longer period. From 1987 to 1998. the club played continuously at the highest level.

=== Ups and downs in the second tier (2009–present) ===
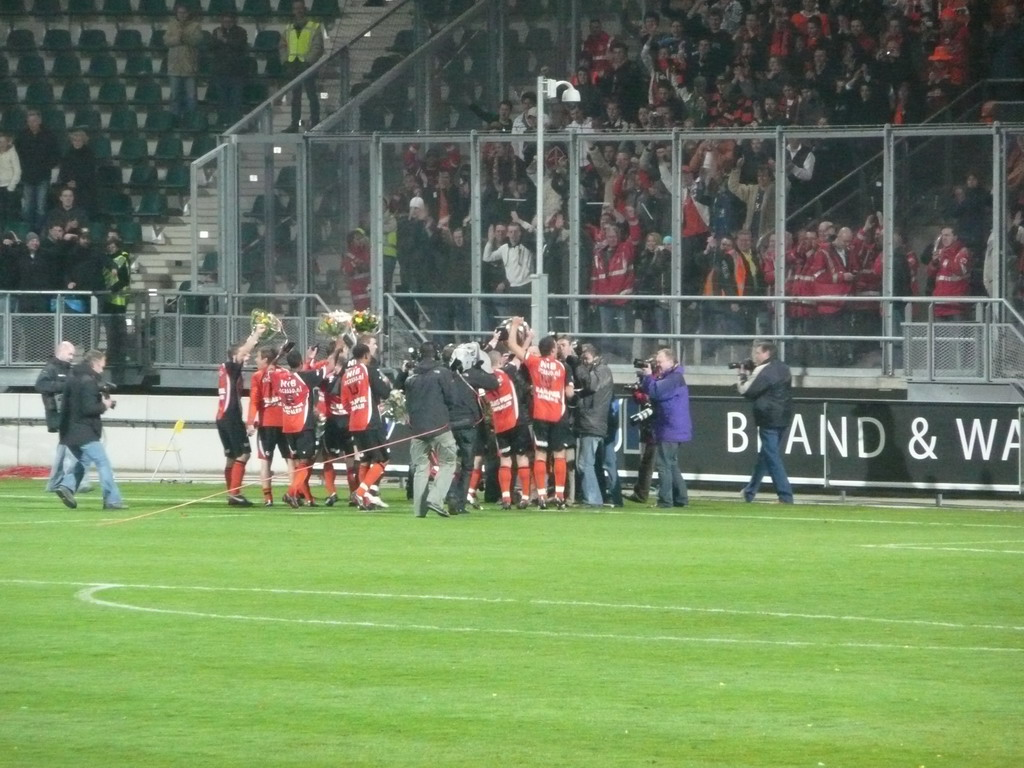
Winning the 2007–08 Eerste Divisie.

In 2009, FC Volendam suffered its latest relegation from the Eredivisie. In the 2007–08 season, Volendam had won the Eerste Divisie championship under the leadership of former professional footballer Stanley Menzo, who had secured the club's participation in the highest division in the following season. Menzo, however, did not extend his contract, which meant that Frans Adelaar took over as new head coach for the 2008–09 season. On 10 May 2009, the last matchday of the season, Volendam suffered relegated to the Eerste Divisie once again, after De Graafschap drew (2–2) and Roda JC's beat Feyenoord (2–3). The following season was dramatic for Volendam: they finished in 16th place in the second tier. In the 2010–11 season, Volendam was led by head coach Gert Kruys, who had come over from FC Dordrecht. Volendam finished in 6th place in his first season. In the following season, Volendam did not win a period title for the first time in a long time, which cost Kruys his job at the club. Between 2012 and 2015 and again between 2018 and 2019, the club was led by Hans de Koning, who had come over from Helmond Sport the first time. In the 2012–13 season, Volendam finished in 2nd place after losing its last game to Go Ahead Eagles. They were then defeated again by Go Ahead Eagles in the final of the playoffs for promotion. In that season, Volendam also managed to win a period title. Due to missing out on promotion, Volendam, for the first time since the start of the Eerste Divisie (1956), competed for more than five consecutive seasons at division 2. In the 2014–15 season, Volendam again lost in the final of the promotion play-offs by losing 0–1 to De Graafschap at home, after the first leg had finished 0–0 in Doetinchem.

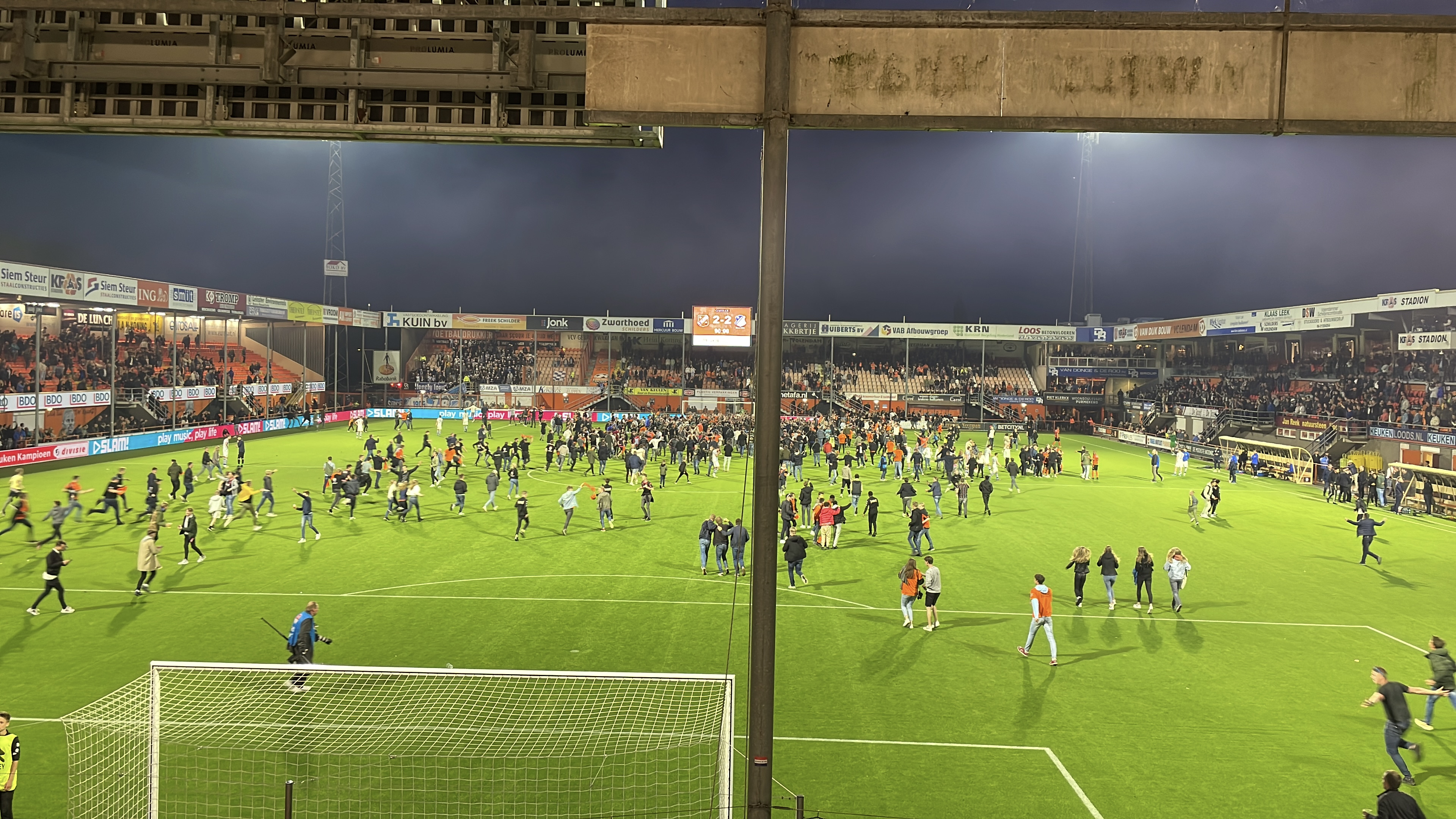
Volendam fans storming the field to celebrate promotion in 2022

In the 2021–22 season, Volendam promoted to the Eredivisie again after 13 years of absence. Two years later, in 2024, Volendam were relegated to the second tier for the tenth time in their history.

== Honours ==
- Eerste Divisie
  - Winners (7): 1958–59, 1960–61, 1966–67, 1969–70, 1986–87, 2007–08, 2024–25
  - Promoted (4): 1976–77, 1982–83, 2002–03, 2021–22
- KNVB Cup
  - Runners-up (2): 1957–58, 1994–95

== Domestic results ==
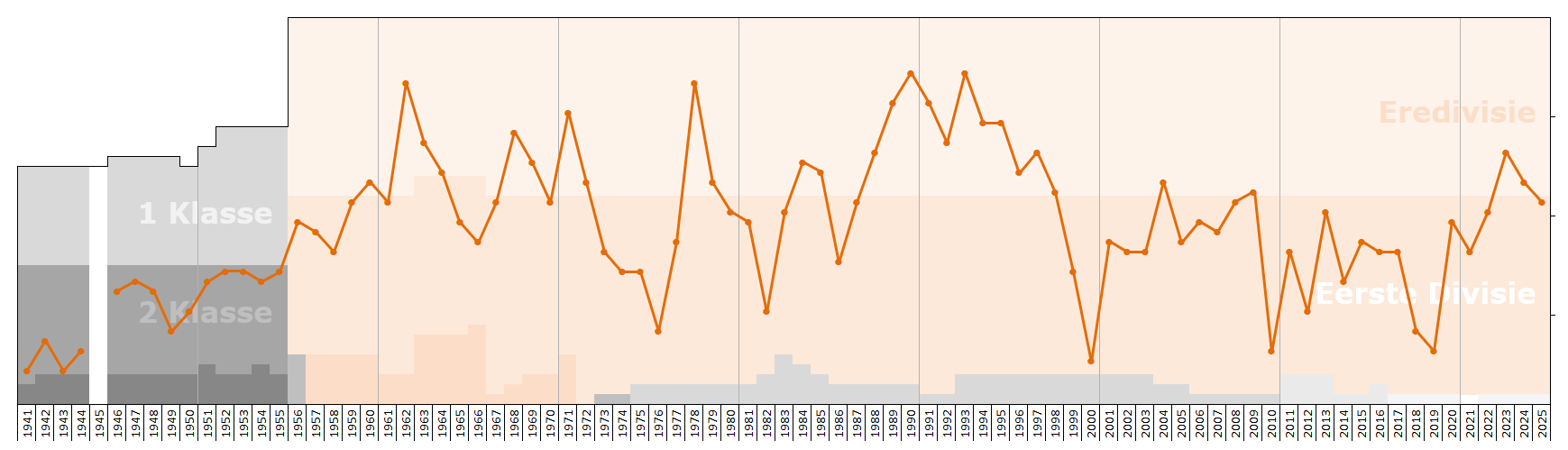
Historical chart of league performance

Below is a table with Volendam's domestic results since the introduction of the Eredivisie in 1956.

Domestic Results since 1956
Domestic league	League result	Qualification to	KNVB Cup season	Cup result
2025–26 Eredivisie	16th	Eerste Divisie (losing promo./releg. play-offs)	2025–26	quarter-finals
2024–25 Eerste Divisie	1st	Eredivisie (promotion)	2024–25	second round
2023–24 Eredivisie	17th	Eerste Divisie (relegation)	2023–24	first round
2022–23 Eredivisie	14th	-	2022–23	second round
2021–22 Eerste Divisie	2nd	Eredivisie (promotion)	2021–22	first round
2020–21 Eerste Divisie	6th	promotion/relegation play-offs: no promotion	2020–21	round of 16
2019–20 Eerste Divisie	3rd	Season abandoned due to COVID-19 pandemic	2019–20	first round
2018–19 Eerste Divisie	16th	-	2018–19	first round
2017–18 Eerste Divisie	14th	-	2017–18	second round
2016–17 Eerste Divisie	6th	promotion/relegation play-offs: no promotion	2016–17	quarter-finals
2015–16 Eerste Divisie	6th	promotion/relegation play-offs: no promotion	2015–16	second round
2014–15 Eerste Divisie	5th	promotion/relegation play-offs: no promotion	2014–15	round of 16
2013–14 Eerste Divisie	9th	-	2013–14	second round
2012–13 Eerste Divisie	2nd	promotion/relegation play-offs: no promotion	2012–13	second round
2011–12 Eerste Divisie	12th	promotion/relegation play-offs: no promotion	2011–12	third round
2010–11 Eerste Divisie	6th	promotion/relegation play-offs: no promotion	2010–11	round of 16
2009–10 Eerste Divisie	16th	-	2009–10	second round
2008–09 Eredivisie	18th	Eerste Divisie (relegation)	2008–09	semi-final
2007–08 Eerste Divisie	1st	Eredivisie (promotion)	2007–08	second round
2006–07 Eerste Divisie	4th	promotion/relegation play-offs: no promotion	2006–07	second round
2005–06 Eerste Divisie	3rd	promotion/relegation play-offs: no promotion	2005–06	round of 16
2004–05 Eerste Divisie	5th	promotion/relegation play-offs: no promotion	2004–05	round of 16
2003–04 Eredivisie	17th	Eerste Divisie (losing promo./releg. play-offs)	2003–04	third round
2002–03 Eerste Divisie	6th	Eredivisie (winning promotion/releg. play-offs)	2002–03	second round
2001–02 Eerste Divisie	6th	promotion/relegation play-offs: no promotion	2001–02	group stage
2000–01 Eerste Divisie	5th	promotion/relegation play-offs: no promotion	2000–01	second round
1999–2000 Eerste Divisie	17th	-	1999–2000	second round
1998–99 Eerste Divisie	8th	-	1998–99	second round
1997–98 Eredivisie	18th	Eerste Divisie (relegation)	1997–98	second round
1996–97 Eredivisie	14th	-	1996–97	round of 16
1995–96 Eredivisie	16th	(surviving promotion/relegation play-off)	1995–96	group stage
1994–95 Eredivisie	11th	-	1994–95	final
1993–94 Eredivisie	11th	-	1993–94	third round
1992–93 Eredivisie	6th	-	1992–93	third round
1991–92 Eredivisie	13th	-	1991–92	third round
1990–91 Eredivisie	9th	-	1990–91	second round
1989–90 Eredivisie	6th	-	1989–90	quarter-final
1988–89 Eredivisie	9th	-	1988–89	second round
1987–88 Eredivisie	14th	-	1987–88	round of 16
1986–87 Eerste Divisie	1st	Eredivisie (promotion)	1986–87	second round
1985–86 Eerste Divisie	7th	-	1985–86	second round
1984–85 Eredivisie	16th	Eerste Divisie (relegation)	1984–85	round of 16
1983–84 Eredivisie	15th	-	1983–84	first round
1982–83 Eerste Divisie	2nd	Eredivisie (promotion)	1982–83	round of 16
1981–82 Eerste Divisie	12th	-	1981–82	second round
1980–81 Eerste Divisie	3rd	-	1980–81	second round
1979–80 Eerste Divisie	2nd	promotion/relegation play-off: no promotion	1979–80	first round
1978–79 Eredivisie	17th	Eerste Divisie (relegation)	1978–79	semi-final
1977–78 Eredivisie	7th	-	1977–78	second round
1976–77 Eerste Divisie	5th	Eredivisie (winning promotion play-off)	1976–77	first round
1975–76 Eerste Divisie	14th	-	1975–76	first round
1974–75 Eerste Divisie	8th	-	1974–75	quarter-final
1973–74 Eerste Divisie	8th	-	1973–74	second round
1972–73 Eerste Divisie	6th	promotion/relegation play-off: no promotion	1972–73	second round
1971–72 Eredivisie	17th	Eerste Divisie (relegation)	1971–72	semi-final
1970–71 Eredivisie	10th	-	1970–71	first round
1969–70 Eerste Divisie	1st	Eredivisie (promotion)	1969–70	first round
1968–69 Eredivisie	15th	Eerste Divisie (losing relegation play-offs)	1968–69	round of 16
1967–68 Eredivisie	12th	-	1967–68	round of 16
1966–67 Eerste Divisie	1st	Eredivisie (promotion)	1966–67	quarter-final
1965–66 Eerste Divisie	7th	-	1965–66	group stage
1964–65 Eerste Divisie	5th	-	1964–65	second round
1963–64 Eredivisie	16th	Eerste Divisie (relegation)	1963–64	first round
1962–63 Eredivisie	13th	-	1962–63	round of 16
1961–62 Eredivisie	7th	-	1961–62	?
1960–61 Eerste Divisie	1st (group A)	Eredivisie (promotion)	1960–61	?
1959–60 Eredivisie	17th	Eerste Divisie (relegation)	not held	not held
1958–59 Eerste Divisie	1st (group A)	Eredivisie (promotion)	1958–59	?
1957–58 Eerste Divisie	6th (group A)	-	1957–58	final
1956–57 Eerste Divisie	4th (group B)	-	1956–57	?

== Current squad ==
As of 22 September 2026

Note: Flags indicate national team as defined under FIFA eligibility rules; some limited exceptions apply. Players may hold more than one non-FIFA nationality.

No.	Pos.	Nation	Player
1	GK	NED	Hidde Jurjus
2	DF	NED	Precious Ugwu
3	DF	TOG	Mawouna Amevor
4	DF	NED	Erik Schouten
5	DF	NED	Daan Bisschops
6	MF	NED	Alex Plat
7	FW	NED	Nick Doodeman
8	MF	NED	Daan Huisman
9	FW	NED	Henk Veerman
10	MF	NED	Reuven Niemeijer
11	FW	NED	Kayden Wolff
12	DF	TTO	Déron Payne

No.	Pos.	Nation	Player
14	FW	ITA	Serigne Deme
15	DF	NED	Mike Kleijn (on loan from Sparta Rotterdam)
16	GK	NED	Roy Steur
18	MF	NED	Nordin Bukala
21	MF	NED	Younes Jaber el Meftahi (on loan from Sparta Rotterdam)
22	GK	NED	Dion Vlak
25	DF	NED	Luca Blondeau
27	FW	NED	Jahmani Gambier
29	FW	NED	Jesper Tielemans
34	MF	MAR	Mohammed Belfqih
63	DF	NED	Jaïr Haakmat
67	FW	DEN	Frederik Ihler (on loan from IF Elfsborg)

=== Out on loan ===
Note: Flags indicate national team as defined under FIFA eligibility rules; some limited exceptions apply. Players may hold more than one non-FIFA nationality.

No.	Pos.	Nation	Player
—	DF	NED	Daniël Beukers (at IJsselmeervogels until 30 June 2027)

== Staff ==
Position	Staff
Head coach	(Netherlands) Rick Kruys
Assistant coach	(Netherlands) Michael Dingsdag (Morocco) Alami Ahannach
Goalkeeper coach	(Netherlands) Frank van der Geest
Video analyst	(Netherlands) Nathasja Keur
Performance coach	(Netherlands) Jelmer Stiekema
Physiotherapist	(Netherlands) Jerel Feller; Abderrahim Dahmani; Peter Jan Roskam; Kenta Inuzuka
Team manager	(Netherlands) Nick Venema

== Former managers ==
- (Netherlands) Leen van Woerkom (1955–58)
- (Indonesia) Quinten Burger (1958–60)
- (Netherlands) Bram Appel (1960–62)
- (Netherlands) Piet Dubbelman (1962–64)
- (England) Ron Dellow (1964–69)
- (Netherlands) Hans Croon (1969–72)
- (Netherlands) Joep Steur (1972–75)
- (Netherlands) Arie Stehouwer (1975–76)
- (Netherlands) Leo Steegman (1976–77)
- (Netherlands) Jan Mak (1977–79)
- (Netherlands) Henk Ellens (1979–80)
- (Netherlands) Joep Steur (1980–81)
- (Netherlands) Dick Maurer (1981–82)
- (Germany) Fritz Korbach (1982–83)
- (Netherlands) Cor van der Hart (1983–84)
- (Netherlands) Joep Steur (1984) (a.i.)
- (Netherlands) Simon Kistemaker (1984) (a.i.)
- (Netherlands) Leo Beenhakker (1984–85)
- (Wales) Barry Hughes (1985–86)
- (Netherlands) Jan Brouwer (1986–88)
- (Netherlands) Leo Steegman (1988–92)
- (Netherlands) André Stafleu (1992–93)
- (Germany) Fritz Korbach (1993–94)
- (Netherlands) Wim Rijsbergen (1994–95)
- (Netherlands) Bert Jacobs (1995–96)
- (Netherlands) Jan Brouwer (1996) (a.i.)
- (Netherlands) Hans van der Zee (1996–97)
- (Netherlands) Dick de Boer (1997–99)
- (Netherlands) Andries Jonker (1999–00)
- (Netherlands) Henk Wisman (2000–04)
- (Netherlands) Johan Steur (2004) (a.i.)
- (Netherlands) Job Dragtsma (2004–05)
- (Netherlands) Ernie Brandts (2005–06)
- (Netherlands) Stanley Menzo (2006–08)
- (Netherlands) Frans Adelaar (2008–09)
- (Netherlands) Edward Sturing (2009–10)
- (Netherlands) Johan Steur (2010) (a.i.)
- (Netherlands) Gert Kruys (2010–12)
- (Netherlands) Johan Steur (2012) (a.i.)
- (Netherlands) Hans de Koning (2012–15)
- (Netherlands) Robert Molenaar (2015–17)
- (Netherlands) Misha Salden (2017–18)
- (Netherlands) Hans de Koning (2018–19)
- (Netherlands) Wim Jonk (2019–2023)
- (Germany) Matthias Kohler (2023)
- (Netherlands) Michael Dingsdag (2023) (a.i.)
- (Netherlands) Regillio Simons (2023–24)
- (Netherlands) Rick Kruys (2023–26)
- (Netherlands) Edwin van de Looi (2026–present)
