= 1976–77 Eerste Divisie =

21st season of the second-tier football league in Netherlands

Eerste Divisie
- Season: 1976–77
- Champions: Vitesse Arnhem
- Promoted: Vitesse Arnhem; FC Volendam
- Goals: 946
- Average goals/game: 2.76

The Dutch Eerste Divisie in the 1976–77 season was contested by 19 teams. Vitesse Arnhem won the championship.

== New entrants ==
Relegated from the 1975–76 Eredivisie

- SBV Excelsior
- MVV Maastricht

== League standings ==
Pos	Team	Pld	W	D	L	GF	GA	GD	Pts	Promotion or qualification
1	Vitesse Arnhem	36	24	7	5	80	29	+51	55	Promoted to Eredivisie.
2	PEC Zwolle	36	21	12	3	63	26	+37	54	Qualified for Promotion play-off as Period champions.
3	MVV Maastricht	36	20	10	6	78	33	+45	50	Qualified for Promotion play-off as Period champions.
4	SBV Excelsior	36	16	15	5	61	37	+24	47	Qualified for Promotion play-off as Period champions.
5	FC Volendam	36	18	9	9	65	42	+23	45	Qualified for Promotion play-off as Period champions.
6	FC Wageningen	36	16	10	10	62	45	+17	42	
7	Fortuna SC	36	16	9	11	61	47	+14	41	
8	FC Groningen	36	14	13	9	43	38	+5	41	
9	FC Vlaardingen	36	13	11	12	45	42	+3	37	
10	SC Cambuur	36	13	9	14	40	53	−13	35	
11	Willem II	36	12	10	14	44	48	−4	34	
12	BVV Den Bosch	36	10	11	15	46	58	−12	31	
13	sc Heerenveen	36	10	10	16	36	51	−15	30	
14	SC Veendam	36	9	11	16	49	58	−9	29	
15	Helmond Sport	36	8	12	16	40	57	−17	28	
16	SVV	36	8	8	20	35	59	−24	24	
17	SC Amersfoort	36	9	6	21	33	73	−40	24	
18	FC Dordrecht	36	7	8	21	35	72	−37	22	
19	SC Heracles	36	3	9	24	30	78	−48	15	

Source: rsssf.com

== Promotion competition ==
In the promotion competition, four period winners (the best teams during each of the four quarters of the regular competition) played for promotion to the Eredivisie.

Pos	Team	Pld	W	D	L	GF	GA	GD	Pts	Promotion
1	FC Volendam	6	3	2	1	12	7	+5	8	Promoted to Eredivisie.
2	PEC Zwolle	6	2	4	0	9	6	+3	8	
3	MVV Maastricht	6	2	2	2	5	6	−1	6	
4	SBV Excelsior	6	0	2	4	3	10	−7	2	

Source: rsssf.com

== Attendances ==
#	Club	Average
1	MVV	8,372
2	Vitesse	7,000
3	Groningen	5,539
4	Zwolle	5,467
5	Cambuur	4,206
6	Fortuna	3,911
7	Volendam	3,767
8	Heerenveen	3,728
9	Wageningen	3,711
10	Veendam	3,644
11	Excelsior	3,467
12	Willem II	3,153
13	Vlaardingen	2,967
14	Den Bosch	2,575
15	Helmond	2,243
16	Heracles	2,178
17	SVV	2,144
18	Dordrecht	2,011
19	Amersfoort	1,503

== See also ==
- 1976–77 Eredivisie
- 1976–77 KNVB Cup
