= Bert Stokkingreef =

Dutch footballer (born 1969)

Personal information
- Date of birth: 1 June 1969 (age 57)
- Place of birth: Almelo, Netherlands
- Position: Forward

Youth career
- 1973–1993: PH Almelo
- 1993–1995: De Zweef

Senior career*
Years	Team	Apps	(Gls)
1995–1996	Groningen	3	(0)
1996–1998	Veendam	45	(6)
1998–1999	STEVO		
1999–2001	Achilles 1894		
2001–2002	STEVO		
2002–2003	Achilles 1894		
2003–2004	PH Almelo		
- * Club domestic league appearances and goals

Bert Stokkingreef (born 1 June 1969) is a Dutch former professional footballer who played as a forward.

== Career ==
Born in Almelo, Stokkingreef started playing at amateur level for PH Almelo and De Zweef. After serving in the Netherlands Marine Corps, professional clubs showed interest in him, and he completed a trial with De Graafschap before choosing to sign with FC Groningen. He made his professional debut in a 5–2 loss in the Eredivisie to Willem II, coming on as a substitute in the 84th minute for Mariano Bombarda. He would fail to make a definitive breakthrough at the club and only made seven first-team appearances during a two-year stint. Of these, however, three were in the UEFA Intertoto Cup, and he made his European debut on 23 June 1995 in a 1–2 away win over Boby Brno.

In 1996, Stokkingreef signed with BV Veendam in the Eerste Divisie, who had already signed Hennie Meijer, Bert Zuurman, Alex Pijper and Arjan Ebbinge from Groningen. At Veendam, he played regularly for two seasons, scoring the winning 2–1 goal in a KNVB Cup win over Ajax.

After leaving Veendam in 1998, Stokkingreef continued in lower league football, having multiple stints with STEVO and Achilles 1894, before retiring as part of his hometown club PH Almelo in 2004 due to a recurring knee injury.

== Retirement ==
Stokkingreef has worked as a drafter in computer-aided design after his retirement from football. He has also coached several youth teams of PH Almelo, as well as lower league clubs Luctor et Emergo and BWO.
