= Dick Tol =

Dutch footballer (1934–1973)

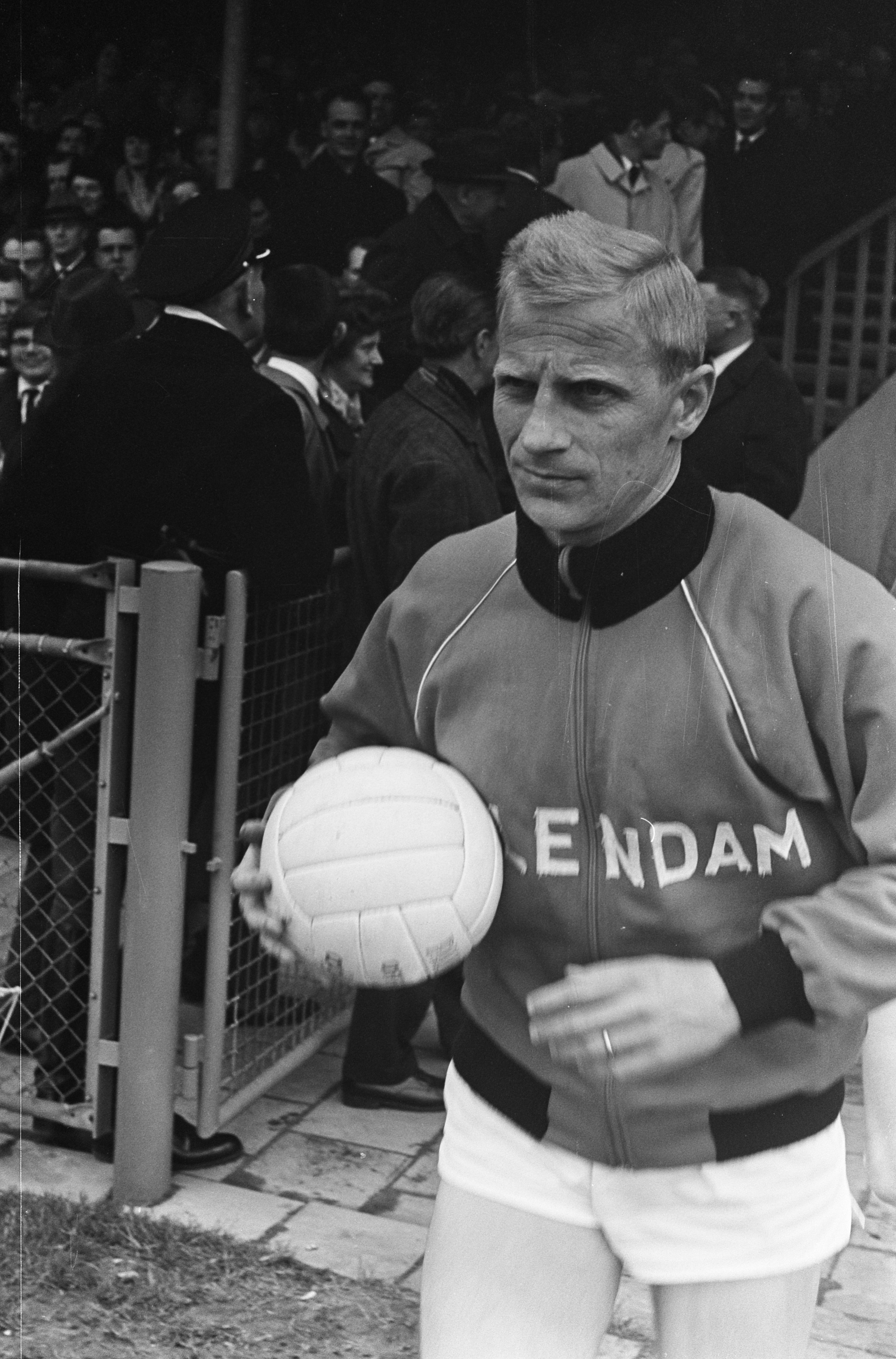
- Tol with Volendam in 1967

Personal information
- Full name: Theodorus Maria Tol
- Date of birth: 21 August 1934
- Place of birth: Volendam, Netherlands
- Date of death: 13 December 1973 (aged 39)
- Place of death: Amsterdam, Netherlands
- Position: Striker

Youth career
- 1946–1955: Volendam

Senior career*
Years	Team	Apps	(Gls)
1955–1967	Volendam	332	(276)
- * Club domestic league appearances and goals

Theodorus Maria "Dick" Tol (21 August 1934 – 13 December 1973) was a Dutch footballer who spent his entire career with Volendam. Nicknamed "De Knoest" ("The Burl"), Tol played as a striker and was the top goalscorer in the Eredivisie in the 1961–62 season, scoring 27 goals. He is also the all-time top goalscorer of Volendam.

== Career ==
Born in Volendam as the son of well-to-do fishmonger, Kees Tol, Dick Tol began playing for FC Volendam after World War II. He was not a technical gifted player, but mainly relied on his explosiveness and physical strength. He was nicknamed "De Knoest" ("The Burl"), an honorary title his grandfather once earned after he saved his boat as a captain during a storm by scooping the boat empty with a bucket for eight hours in a row. De Knoest therefore refers to the primal power of the fisherman, a symbol of the town of Volendam. Despite Tol being a renowned goalscorer as a youth player, exemplified by scoring 12 goals in a whopping 48–0 win over RKEDO from De Goorn, he only made his debut in the first-team of Volendam at age 21 under head coach Leen van Woerkom. In his first season in the top-tier Eerste Klasse, he scored thirty goals. A season later, in the newly established Eerste Divisie, he hit the target 36 times, making him the top goalscorer of the competition.

In the 1958–59 season, Volendam was promoted to the Eredivisie, only to suffer relegation again a year later. A second promotion followed a year later. Tol became the top goalscorer of the Eredivisie in the 1961–62 season with 27 goals, despite missing nine matches that season due to an injury. His team finished seventh that year. The striker's good performances led to his first call-up to the Netherlands national team, who played against Denmark on 26 September 1962. Three days before the international fixture, Tol suffered a sprained ankle in a duel with Guus Haak from ADO, which forced him to cancel. For Tol, this remained his only call up for the national team. He did appear for the Netherlands national B team several times and after his career he played for a team of former internationals.

After three years playing in the Eredivisie, Tol and Volendam relegated back to the Eerste Divisie in 1964. In the 1966–67 season, Tol became the top goalscorer of the second-tier for the second time in his career with 32 goals. Volendam won the championship and promoted, but Tol decided to retire from football. He made a total of 276 league goals during his career which meant that he scored in 83% of his appearances, making him the club topscorer of Volendam. In the Eredivisie, he scored 76 goals in 101 appearances.

== Later life and death ==
After his playing career, Tol coached amateur club OSV from Oostzaan. Later, he was a coordinator of the FC Volendam coaches as well as a youth coach at the club. He was diagnosed with colorectal cancer in 1973, and died at the age of 39 in the Onze Lieve Vrouwe Gasthuis hospital in Amsterdam due to complications shortly after receiving colon surgery.
