= Barger-Oosterveld =

- Neighbourhood
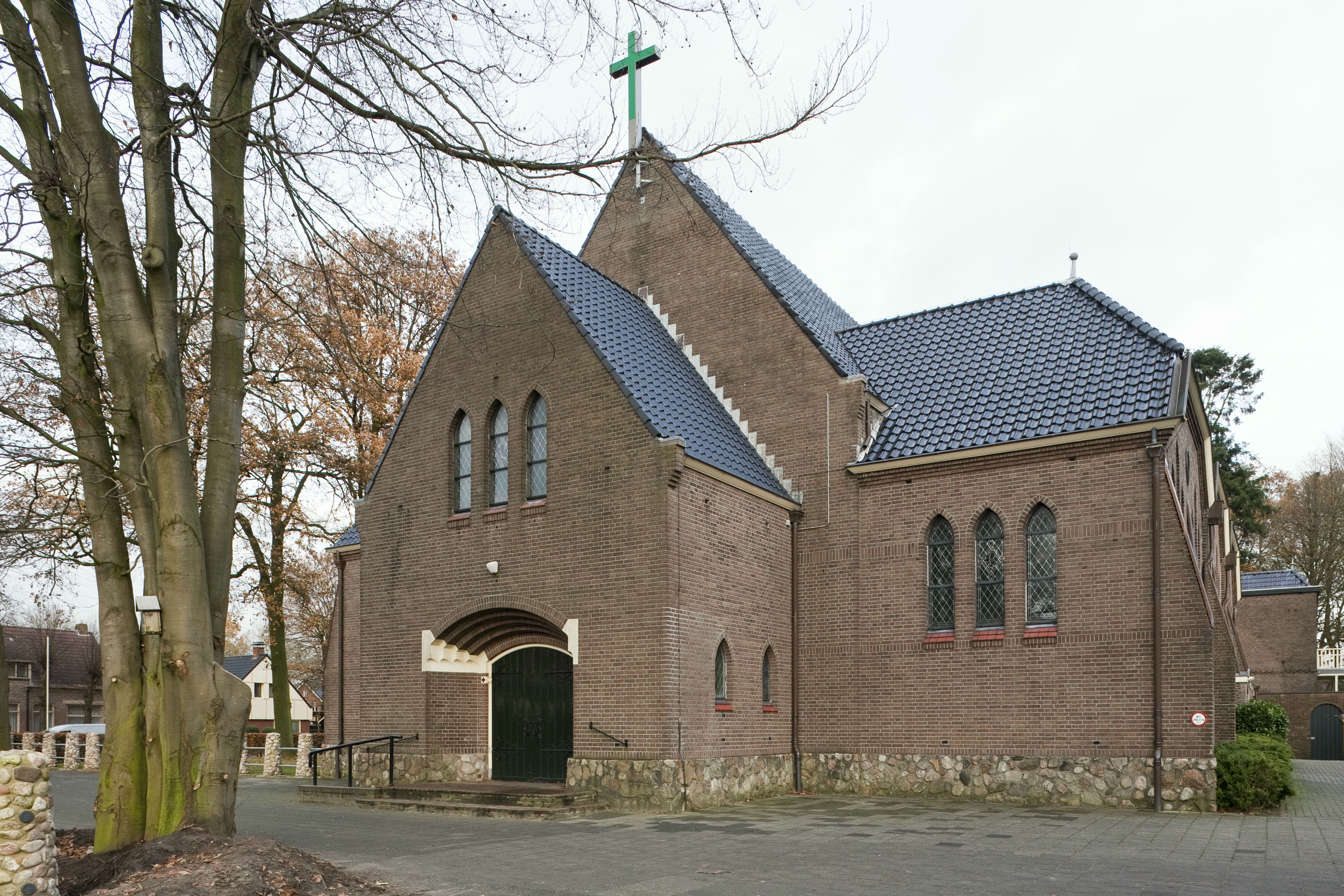
- Church of Barger-Oostveld

- Location in province of Drenthe in the Netherlands Barger-Oosterveld (Netherlands)
- Country: Netherlands
- Province: Drenthe
- Municipality: Emmen

Area
  - Total: 1.93 km^{2} (0.75 sq mi)
- Elevation: 24 m (79 ft)

Population (2021)
  - Total: 3,055
  - Density: 1,580/km^{2} (4,100/sq mi)
- Time zone: UTC+1 (CET)
  - Summer (DST): UTC+2 (CEST)
- Postal code: 7826
- Dialing code: 0591

Barger-Oosterveld is a neighbourhood and former village of Emmen in the Dutch province of Drenthe. In 1957, the Temple of Barger-Oosterveld was discovered.

== History ==
Around 1870, Barger-Oosterveld started as a settlement of sod houses to excavate the peat. Later farmers moved into the area. Most of the settlers came from neighbouring Germany. It was first mentioned in 1899 as Bargeroosterveld, and means "eastern field of Barge". In 1932, it was home to 954 people.

In 1978, the village was annexed by neighbouring Emmen, and has become a neighbourhood.

== Temple of Barger-Oosterveld ==
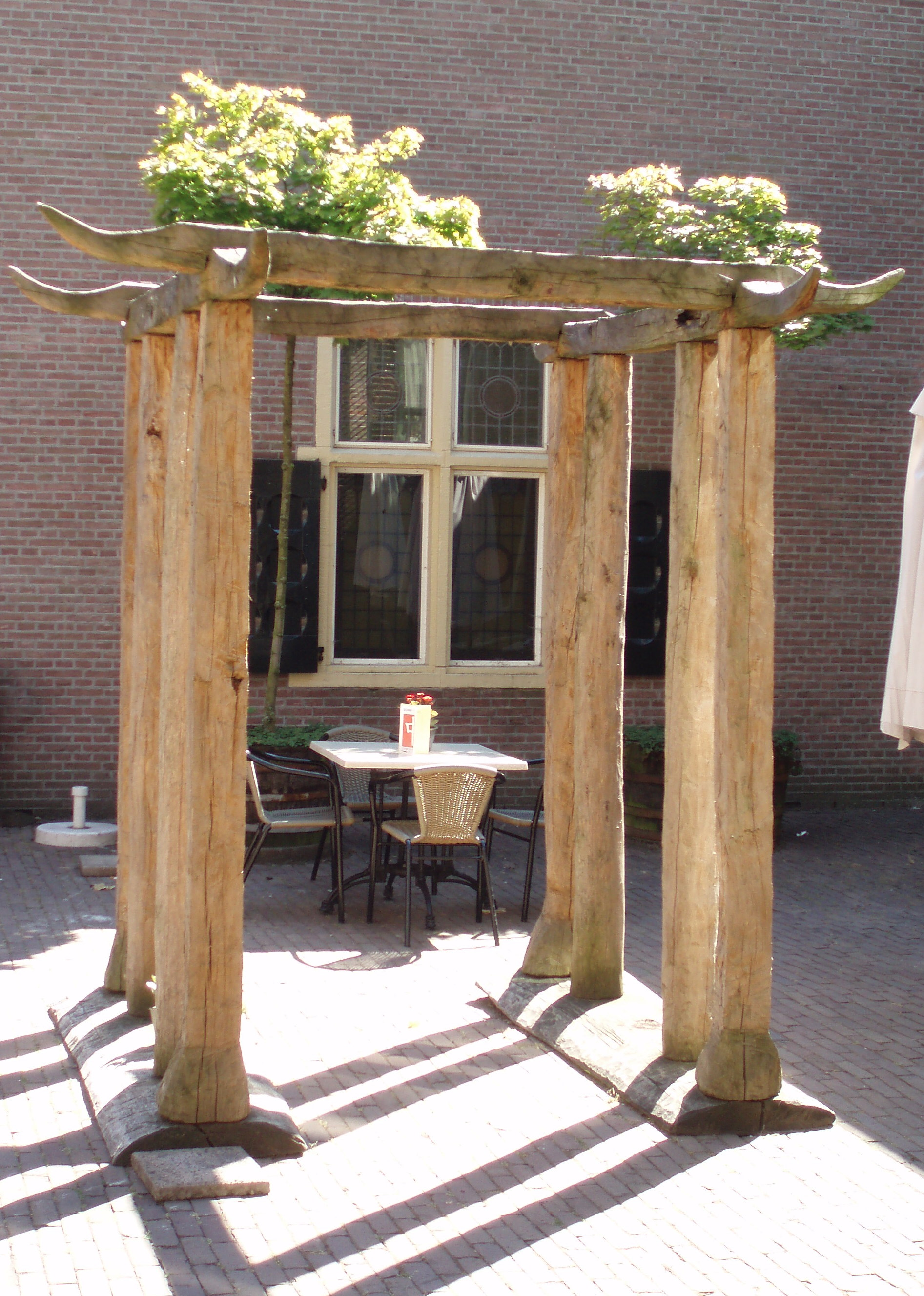
The temple of Barger-Oosterveld

On 9 March 1957, the Temple of Barger-Oosterveld was discovered. The temple was a wooden construction of two by two metres surrounded by a circle of stones. It clearly served a religion function, however the details have been lost in antiquity. The wood has been dated to 1478 to 1470 BC. The temple is located in the Drents Museum.

== Notable people ==
- Cor Fuhler (1964–2020), composer, and instrument builder
