= 1995–96 Eredivisie =

40th season of the Eredivisie

Eredivisie
- Season: 1995–96
- Dates: 18 August 1995 – 5 May 1996
- Champions: Ajax (26th title)
- Promoted: Fortuna Sittard; De Graafschap
- Relegated: Go Ahead Eagles
- Champions League: Ajax
- Cup Winners' Cup: PSV
- UEFA Cup: Feyenoord; Roda JC
- Intertoto Cup: sc Heerenveen; FC Groningen
- Goals: 920
- Average goals/game: 3.00
- Top goalscorer: (Belgium) Luc Nilis (21 goals)
- Biggest home win: PSV-Graafschap (8–0)
- Biggest away win: NEC-Ajax (0–6)
- Highest scoring: 8–0

The 1995–96 Eredivisieseason was contested by 18 teams. Ajax won the championship. From this season onwards a match win was rewarded with 3 points instead of 2.

== League standings ==
Pos	Team	Pld	W	D	L	GF	GA	GD	Pts	Qualification or relegation
1	Ajax (C)	34	26	5	3	97	24	+73	83	Qualification to Champions League group stage
2	PSV (Note: Winners KNVB Cup.)	34	24	5	5	97	25	+72	77	Qualification to Cup Winners' Cup first round
3	Feyenoord	34	18	9	7	66	36	+30	63	Qualification to UEFA Cup first round
4	Roda JC	34	15	12	7	51	35	+16	57	Qualification to UEFA Cup first round
5	Vitesse Arnhem	34	15	8	11	48	44	+4	53	
6	Sparta	34	14	11	9	53	53	0	53	
7	sc Heerenveen	34	14	11	9	66	68	−2	53	Qualification to Intertoto Cup group stage
8	NAC	34	14	10	10	58	44	+14	52	
9	FC Groningen	34	12	13	9	48	45	+3	49	Qualification to Intertoto Cup group stage
10	FC Twente	34	14	6	14	46	55	−9	48	
11	RKC	34	11	11	12	44	44	0	44	
12	Willem II	34	9	12	13	53	59	−6	39	
13	Fortuna Sittard	34	6	13	15	27	54	−27	31	
14	De Graafschap	34	6	11	17	37	66	−29	29	
15	FC Utrecht	34	6	10	18	27	59	−32	28	
16	FC Volendam	34	6	9	19	29	65	−36	27	Qualification to Relegation play-offs (Note: Volendam and NEC both remained in the eredivisie after winning promotion/relegation play-offs.)
17	NEC	34	6	7	21	33	73	−40	25	Qualification to Relegation play-offs
18	Go Ahead Eagles (R)	34	5	7	22	40	71	−31	22	Relegation to Eerste Divisie

(C) Champions; (R) Relegated

== Results ==
Home \ Away	AJX	FEY	FOR	GAE	GRA	GRO	HEE	NAC	NEC	PSV	RKC	RJC	SPA	TWE	UTR	VIT	VOL	WIL
Ajax	—	2–0	4–0	2–1	1–0	4–1	6–2	2–0	3–1	1–1	1–0	6–1	4–0	6–1	4–0	3–0	4–0	5–1
Feyenoord	2–4	—	1–0	2–2	2–0	4–1	4–1	2–2	2–1	0–0	4–0	2–0	1–1	1–0	3–0	5–2	5–1	2–0
Fortuna Sittard	1–2	1–0	—	2–2	1–0	0–0	1–2	2–2	1–1	1–3	0–0	1–1	0–1	1–1	2–1	0–0	2–2	0–0
Go Ahead Eagles	0–4	0–3	2–0	—	4–0	2–2	2–3	1–1	2–2	0–5	1–3	1–2	1–3	1–3	2–3	1–3	1–2	0–2
De Graafschap	0–0	1–1	1–1	3–2	—	3–1	2–2	1–1	2–3	1–2	1–1	0–2	5–2	0–3	3–0	2–3	1–0	1–2
Groningen	3–4	1–0	2–0	0–0	3–0	—	1–1	3–1	0–0	1–0	1–1	0–1	5–1	2–2	0–0	2–0	2–1	3–0
Heerenveen	0–4	0–1	5–1	2–1	2–2	1–0	—	1–1	4–1	1–3	2–1	3–2	4–0	1–1	4–2	1–2	4–3	2–2
NAC	0–1	0–3	2–0	2–0	2–1	1–1	5–1	—	2–1	3–0	0–1	0–0	0–0	4–1	3–0	2–2	4–0	0–1
NEC	0–6	1–3	0–2	0–2	1–1	0–2	1–3	1–3	—	0–5	2–1	1–4	2–2	1–4	2–0	0–1	2–1	1–1
PSV Eindhoven	1–1	3–0	3–0	3–1	8–0	7–1	5–1	4–1	1–0	—	4–0	3–0	1–2	3–0	0–0	1–0	7–0	2–0
RKC	0–3	1–1	1–1	1–1	5–0	1–3	2–3	2–2	4–0	1–3	—	2–0	0–0	1–0	1–0	0–2	2–0	3–2
Roda	2–0	1–1	1–1	5–0	3–1	0–0	2–2	5–1	1–0	1–1	2–2	—	1–0	0–0	3–1	0–1	2–0	1–1
Sparta Rotterdam	3–3	3–2	0–1	2–0	4–1	1–1	5–2	3–1	3–1	2–1	1–0	2–2	—	4–2	0–0	3–0	1–0	1–1
Twente	0–3	2–2	1–0	2–1	1–0	2–2	0–1	0–3	2–0	3–2	0–1	0–3	1–0	—	1–2	1–0	2–1	2–1
Utrecht	0–3	1–0	2–3	1–0	1–1	0–1	1–1	0–4	1–2	1–4	0–0	0–1	0–0	0–3	—	2–0	2–2	3–3
Vitesse	2–1	0–2	5–1	0–3	0–1	0–0	2–2	2–0	2–2	0–1	2–1	0–0	3–2	2–0	2–1	—	2–1	2–2
Volendam	0–0	0–3	2–0	2–1	1–1	2–1	1–1	1–2	1–0	0–5	1–1	1–0	1–1	1–3	0–1	1–1	—	0–0
Willem II	1–0	2–2	4–0	1–2	1–1	5–2	1–1	1–3	1–3	2–5	1–2	1–2	6–0	5–2	1–1	0–5	1–0	—

Source: Eredivisie.nl (in Dutch)
Legend: Blue = home team win; Yellow = draw; Red = away team win.

== Relegation play-offs ==
In the promotion/relegation competition, eight entrants (six from this league and two from the Eredivisie) entered in two groups. The group winners were promoted to the Eredivisie.

Group A
Pos	Team	Pld	W	D	L	GF	GA	GD	Pts	Result
1	FC Volendam	6	6	0	0	10	2	+8	18	Remain in Eredivisie
2	SC Heracles	6	3	1	2	13	7	+6	10	Remain in Eerste Divisie
3	VVV-Venlo	6	1	1	4	3	9	−6	4	Remain in Eerste Divisie
4	FC Den Bosch	6	0	2	4	2	10	−8	2	Remain in Eerste Divisie

Group B
Pos	Team	Pld	W	D	L	GF	GA	GD	Pts	Result
1	NEC	6	5	0	1	12	4	+8	15	Remain in Eredivisie
2	BV Veendam	6	3	1	2	8	7	+1	10	Remain in Eerste Divisie
3	Emmen	6	3	0	3	10	8	+2	9	Remain in Eerste Divisie
4	Cambuur Leeuwarden	6	0	1	5	2	13	−11	1	Remain in Eerste Divisie

== Attendances ==
No.	Club	Average	Change	Highest
1	Feyenoord	26,639	-5,7%	42,000
2	PSV	25,738	0,3%	29,000
3	AFC Ajax	22,393	-5,1%	48,000
4	sc Heerenveen	13,203	4,2%	13,500
5	FC Groningen	11,999	-2,8%	17,200
6	NAC Breda	9,640	-6,6%	10,850
7	Willem II	8,532	8,1%	14,700
8	Roda JC	8,197	-9,8%	14,000
9	FC Utrecht	7,570	3,6%	14,000
10	De Graafschap	7,116	72,1%	10,700
11	SBV Vitesse	6,911	-1,2%	11,400
12	FC Twente	6,884	-12,6%	13,200
13	Go Ahead Eagles	6,728	8,7%	10,000
14	Fortuna Sittard	6,512	54,8%	14,500
15	NEC	5,188	-8,5%	18,000
16	Sparta Rotterdam	4,406	-10,2%	12,500
17	FC Volendam	4,106	7,2%	8,000
18	RKC Waalwijk	3,594	19,8%	6,500

== See also ==
- 1995–96 in Dutch football
- 1995–96 Eerste Divisie
- 1995–96 KNVB Cup
