= RKVV STEVO =

Football club from Geesteren, Netherlands

- Full name: Rooms Katholieke Voetbalvereniging STEVO
- Founded: 13 October 1933
- Ground: Sportpark De Peuverweide, Geesteren
- League: Eerste Klasse Sunday E (2019–20)
- Website: http://www.stevogeesteren.nl/
Home colours

RKVV STEVO is a football club from Geesteren, Netherlands. RKVV STEVO plays in the 2017–18 Sunday Eerste Klasse E.

From 1990 up to 2003 RKVV STEVO played continuously in the Hoofdklasse, at that time the highest amateur league. In 1994 they became Sunday amateur champions.
