= 1955–56 Netherlands Football League Championship =

Netherl. Football Championship
- Season: 1955–1956
- Champions: Rapid JC (1st title)

The Netherlands Football League Championship 1955–1956 was contested by 36 teams participating in two divisions. The national champion was determined by a play-off featuring the two best placed teams in both divisions of the Netherlands. Rapid JC won this year's championship by beating NAC, Elinkwijk and Sparta Rotterdam.

== New entrant ==
- SHS

== Divisions ==
=== Hoofdklasse A ===
==== Table ====
Pos	Team	Pld	W	D	L	GF	GA	GD	Pts	Qualification or relegation
1	Sparta Rotterdam	34	18	10	6	60	38	+22	46	Qualified for Championship play-off
2	NAC	34	20	5	9	58	40	+18	45	Qualified for Championship play-off
3	Fortuna	34	16	12	6	66	34	+32	44	
4	AFC Ajax	34	17	8	9	64	44	+20	42	
5	VVV Venlo	34	16	8	10	55	34	+21	40	
6	DOS	34	16	8	10	91	68	+23	40	
7	FC Eindhoven	34	13	12	9	57	46	+11	38	
8	BVC Amsterdam	34	14	9	11	58	43	+15	37	
9	NOAD	34	13	10	11	55	55	0	36	
10	Limburgia	34	12	11	11	56	56	0	35	Relegated to Eerste Divisie
11	SBV Excelsior	34	12	10	12	53	61	−8	34	Relegated to Eerste Divisie
12	ADO Den Haag	34	12	8	14	59	62	−3	32	Relegated to Eerste Divisie
13	Stormvogels	34	10	12	12	60	66	−6	32	Relegated to Eerste Divisie
14	Roda Sport	34	8	9	17	63	81	−18	25	Relegated to Eerste Divisie
15	Vitesse Arnhem	34	8	8	18	48	67	−19	24	Relegated to Eerste Divisie
16	Hollandia Victoria Combinatie	34	6	12	16	45	71	−26	24	Relegated to Eerste Divisie
17	Rigtersbleek	34	8	4	22	44	86	−42	20	Relegated to Eerste Divisie
18	EBOH	34	3	12	19	40	80	−40	18	Relegated to Eerste Divisie

Source: rsssf.com

==== Results ====
Home \ Away	ADO	AJA	AMS	DOS	EBO	EIN	EXC	F54	HVC	LIM	NAC	NOA	RIG	RSP	SPA	STO	VIT	VVV
ADO		1–4	1–2	5–3	5–2	2–1	3–0	0–2	1–1	5–2	0–1	2–0	3–1	1–1	1–2	2–2	2–1	0–0
Ajax	2–1		1–1	6–3	2–2	4–1	4–0	1–4	2–3	0–1	0–2	0–0	1–1	2–0	1–1	2–0	2–0	1–3
Amsterdam	3–5	1–0		3–1	4–0	1–1	1–2	0–5	2–1	4–2	0–0	0–0	6–0	4–1	1–2	0–1	0–1	1–0
DOS	2–1	3–0	3–3		6–1	2–2	4–3	0–0	5–2	2–0	0–2	7–3	6–3	5–2	0–2	4–2	3–1	1–0
EBOH	2–2	1–2	0–1	2–4		0–1	0–1	1–6	1–5	1–1	1–3	1–1	3–2	2–2	1–5	5–1	0–0	3–0
Eindhoven	3–1	2–3	3–2	4–2	1–1		1–1	0–0	6–1	0–0	8–2	1–1	2–0	0–3	1–0	2–2	5–3	0–1
Excelsior	3–2	4–6	0–0	0–0	1–0	1–2		2–3	4–1	0–1	1–0	2–1	1–1	3–3	0–2	2–3	5–3	2–1
Fortuna '54	0–1	1–2	0–3	3–3	1–1	1–1	5–1		0–0	2–0	0–1	1–1	4–1	2–2	3–1	1–0	1–0	2–3
HVC	3–2	0–6	1–1	1–1	2–2	0–1	1–3	0–0		2–2	4–1	2–2	1–2	2–0	0–1	2–2	1–1	0–2
Limburgia	2–2	0–0	1–1	1–4	2–2	3–3	0–0	0–0	4–1		1–2	2–1	4–0	2–1	5–3	4–2	4–1	2–1
NAC	1–1	0–1	1–0	3–2	2–0	1–0	2–1	1–1	3–1	2–0		0–1	3–0	2–2	1–0	5–1	3–1	3–1
NOAD	5–1	1–2	1–4	2–1	3–1	2–0	3–0	0–1	3–0	1–2	3–1		3–0	3–1	0–0	2–3	2–2	0–6
Rigtersbleek	1–0	0–1	3–2	0–6	5–0	1–2	0–0	1–3	5–2	2–4	3–1	0–1		0–2	0–3	1–1	1–0	1–2
Roda Sport	4–1	1–2	2–1	2–2	2–2	2–0	3–4	2–3	1–3	2–2	1–5	1–2	2–4		3–2	2–2	4–2	2–1
Sparta	1–1	1–0	1–4	4–1	1–0	1–1	2–2	2–1	0–0	1–0	3–2	3–3	5–0	2–1		2–1	3–1	0–0
Stormvogels	3–0	2–2	0–1	2–2	3–1	1–1	0–0	1–5	1–1	3–2	0–2	1–2	6–2	6–2	1–1		3–1	2–2
Vitesse	2–3	2–2	3–1	0–1	1–1	0–1	0–1	0–3	2–1	4–0	2–0	2–2	2–1	4–3	2–2	3–1		0–0
VVV	0–1	1–0	0–0	3–2	2–0	1–0	3–3	2–2	2–0	1–0	0–0	5–0	4–2	3–1	0–1	0–1	5–1	

Legend: Blue = home team win; Yellow = draw; Red = away team win.

=== Hoofdklasse B ===
==== Table ====
Pos	Team	Pld	W	D	L	GF	GA	GD	Pts	Qualification or relegation
1	Elinkwijk	34	22	6	6	79	36	+43	50	Qualified for Championship play-off
2	Rapid	34	20	8	6	90	46	+44	48	Play-off as level on points
3	SC Enschede	34	21	6	7	91	56	+35	48	Play-off as level on points
4	PSV Eindhoven	34	22	3	9	96	55	+41	47	
5	Feijenoord	34	17	7	10	93	62	+31	41	
6	BVV Den Bosch	34	17	5	12	67	45	+22	39	
7	Willem II	34	17	5	12	64	53	+11	39	
8	MVV Maastricht	34	16	6	12	68	47	+21	38	
9	DFC	34	15	7	12	69	61	+8	37	Relegation play-off as level on points
10	GVAV Rapiditas	34	15	7	12	68	64	+4	37	Relegation play-off as level on points
11	Alkmaar '54	34	13	7	14	47	55	−8	33	Relegated to Eerste Divisie
12	Sittardia	34	12	9	13	63	77	−14	33	Relegated to Eerste Divisie
13	De Graafschap	34	8	11	15	46	72	−26	27	Relegated to Eerste Divisie
14	SHS	34	11	5	18	58	75	−17	25 (Note: 2 points deducted)	Relegated to Eerste Divisie
15	SVV	34	9	6	19	57	69	−12	24	Relegated to Eerste Divisie
16	HFC EDO	34	9	4	21	37	66	−29	22	Relegated to Eerste Divisie
17	De Volewijckers	34	5	3	26	49	126	−77	13	Relegated to Eerste Divisie
18	Emma	34	2	5	27	28	105	−77	9	Relegated to Eerste Divisie

Source: rsssf.com

==== Results ====
Home \ Away	ALK	BVV	DFC	EDO	ELI	EMA	ENS	FEY	GRA	GVA	MVV	PSV	RAP	SHS	SIT	SVV	VWK	WIL
Alkmaar '54		0–2	0–0	1–2	2–0	2–0	0–1	2–3	2–1	1–1	3–1	3–2	2–2	3–2	1–1	2–0	1–0	1–0
BVV	4–1		1–1	2–1	1–2	3–1	0–2	0–0	4–2	0–1	1–1	2–3	1–2	0–2	1–0	3–2	4–2	1–2
D.F.C.	2–3	2–1		3–1	1–2	2–2	1–7	0–0	3–1	2–1	2–1	3–1	0–2	4–1	0–0	3–1	6–1	0–3
EDO	2–1	0–4	2–3		0–0	1–0	0–3	1–2	1–2	1–2	1–0	1–3	1–1	1–0	1–3	4–1	1–2	0–1
Elinkwijk	2–1	1–1	3–1	3–1		6–0	0–0	4–1	1–1	4–0	2–0	3–0	2–0	6–1	3–0	2–1	5–1	3–1
Emma	1–1	1–3	1–7	0–1	1–5		1–2	0–6	1–1	1–3	1–4	1–0	0–1	1–5	1–4	0–4	3–4	1–1
SC Enschede	2–2	2–4	1–1	2–1	4–0	3–4		4–3	4–0	0–1	3–1	4–3	1–6	2–2	6–1	2–1	1–1	2–1
Feijenoord	0–3	2–2	1–1	1–1	1–1	2–0	4–3		6–1	5–1	1–3	2–4	2–0	6–1	3–1	2–0	11–4	0–1
De Graafschap	0–1	1–3	0–2	3–1	2–0	1–0	0–2	3–5		0–0	1–3	2–1	1–1	3–0	3–3	1–1	3–2	2–2
GVAV	4–1	1–5	3–2	1–3	0–3	9–0	3–1	5–4	3–0		2–2	2–3	0–3	3–0	3–1	1–0	3–0	0–1
MVV	5–1	0–1	4–0	2–1	1–3	1–0	1–2	2–1	3–1	1–1		0–0	0–3	2–0	2–3	3–0	7–1	3–1
PSV	4–3	1–0	6–2	5–0	4–1	4–0	1–5	3–2	3–0	2–2	3–0		4–1	4–1	5–0	3–1	5–2	1–2
Rapid JC	6–0	2–1	1–3	4–1	2–1	2–1	3–3	4–1	6–1	4–1	2–2	5–3		0–0	4–2	2–2	3–0	5–2
SHS	1–0	1–5	0–1	5–0	2–3	6–1	1–3	1–1	1–3	4–1	1–2	1–2	2–1		4–3	2–2	1–0	3–6
Sittardia	0–0	1–3	3–2	3–1	1–1	2–2	1–2	2–4	2–2	3–2	0–4	2–2	3–2	0–0		4–3	3–2	1–0
SVV	0–1	2–1	2–7	2–0	4–2	4–0	2–3	1–4	1–1	3–3	2–1	0–1	1–1	0–1	4–2		3–1	0–2
De Volewijckers	2–1	1–2	3–2	1–3	0–4	2–1	1–6	2–5	3–3	1–1	0–3	0–6	2–6	2–5	4–5	2–6		0–4
Willem II	2–1	2–1	2–0	1–1	0–1	3–1	5–3	1–2	1–1	3–4	3–3	2–4	0–3	4–1	0–3	2–1	3–0	

Legend: Blue = home team win; Yellow = draw; Red = away team win.

=== Promotion play-off ===
Team 1	Score	Team 2
Rapid	4–3	SC Enschede

Rapid qualify for the Championship play-offs.

=== Relegation play-off ===
Team 1	Score	Team 2
GVAV Rapiditas	4–3 (a.e.t.)	DFC

DFC are relegated to Eerste Divisie.

=== Championship play-off ===
Pos	Team	Pld	W	D	L	GF	GA	GD	Pts	Qualification	RAP	NAC	ELI	SPA
1	Rapid JC	6	4	0	2	13	7	+6	8	Qualification for the European Cup preliminary round		5–1	3–1	3–1
2	NAC	6	4	0	2	13	11	+2	8		0–1		5–2	2–0
3	Elinkwijk	6	2	1	3	12	14	−2	5		2–0	2–3		5–3
4	Sparta Rotterdam	6	1	1	4	7	13	−6	3		2–1	1–2	0–0	

Source: rsssf.com
