= 1953–54 Netherlands Football League Championship =

Netherl. Football Championship
- Season: 1953–1954
- Champions: FC Eindhoven (1st title)

The Netherlands Football League Championship 1953–1954 was contested by 56 teams participating in four divisions. It would be the last season on an amateur basis. The national champion would be determined by a play-off featuring the winners of each division of the Netherlands. FC Eindhoven won this year's championship by beating DOS, PSV Eindhoven and DWS.

== New entrants ==
Eerste Klasse A:

- Moving in from Division B: Be Quick 1887, Blauw-Wit Amsterdam, DWS, Elinkwijk, HFC Haarlem and Stormvogels
- Promoted from 2nd Division: Oosterparkers

Eerste Klasse B:

- Moving in from Division A: DOS, HFC EDO, GVAV Rapiditas, Sneek Wit Zwart, De Volewijckers and VSV
- Promoted from 2nd Division: Rigtersbleek

Eerste Klasse C:

- Moving in from Division D: Bleijerheide, NAC, PSV Eindhoven and Xerxes
- Promoted from 2nd Division: VVH Heerlen

Eerste Klasse D:

- Moving in from Division C: SBV Excelsior, Juliana, MVV Maastricht and Willem II
- Promoted from 2nd Division: EBOH

== Divisions ==
=== Eerste Klasse A ===
Pos	Team	Pld	W	D	L	GF	GA	GD	Pts	Qualification or relegation
1	DWS	26	16	5	5	54	24	+30	37	Qualified for Championship play-off and transferred to Eerste B
2	AFC Ajax	26	14	9	3	60	29	+31	37	Transferred to Eerste D
3	HFC Haarlem	26	15	5	6	47	22	+25	35	Transferred to Eerste C
4	NEC Nijmegen	26	11	11	4	49	32	+17	33	Transferred to Eerste C
5	Stormvogels	26	12	7	7	42	30	+12	31	
6	FC Wageningen	26	10	9	7	48	35	+13	29	Transferred to Eerste B
7	Elinkwijk	26	10	6	10	37	42	−5	26	Transferred to Eerste B
8	Enschedese Boys	26	7	11	8	37	31	+6	25	Transferred to Eerste C
9	VV Leeuwarden	26	9	6	11	43	40	+3	24	
10	Heracles	26	8	5	13	37	43	−6	21	Transferred to Eerste B
11	Be Quick 1887	26	5	10	11	34	68	−34	20	Transferred to Eerste D
12	Zwolsche Boys	26	6	6	14	23	57	−34	18	
13	RCH	26	3	9	14	26	50	−24	15	Relegated to 2nd Division
14	Oosterparkers	26	4	5	17	25	59	−34	13	Relegated to 2nd Division

Source: rsssf.com

=== Eerste Klasse B ===
Pos	Team	Pld	W	D	L	GF	GA	GD	Pts	Qualification or relegation
1	DOS	26	17	5	4	78	40	+38	39	Qualified for Championship play-off and transferred to Eerste A
2	VSV	26	17	2	7	52	25	+27	36	Transferred to Eerste D
3	Go Ahead	26	11	8	7	49	45	+4	30	Transferred to Eerste A
4	Blauw-Wit Amsterdam	26	11	6	9	58	50	+8	28	Transferred to Eerste C
5	De Volewijckers	26	10	8	8	56	58	−2	28	Transferred to Eerste D
6	Vitesse Arnhem	26	8	11	7	41	46	−5	27	Transferred to Eerste C
7	Rigtersbleek	26	12	2	12	58	57	+1	26	
8	GVAV Rapiditas	26	8	9	9	39	37	+2	25	Transferred to Eerste C
9	AGOVV Apeldoorn	26	10	4	12	49	50	−1	24	Transferred to Eerste D
10	HFC EDO	26	7	9	10	35	48	−13	23	
11	sc Heerenveen	26	8	6	12	57	68	−11	22	
12	SC Enschede	26	7	7	12	40	41	−1	21	Transferred to Eerste D
13	Sneek Wit Zwart	26	7	5	14	30	52	−22	19	Relegated to 2nd Division
14	HVV 't Gooi	26	5	6	15	31	56	−25	16	Relegated to 2nd Division

Source: rsssf.com

=== Eerste Klasse C ===
Pos	Team	Pld	W	D	L	GF	GA	GD	Pts	Qualification or relegation
1	PSV Eindhoven	26	17	4	5	72	41	+31	38	Qualified for Championship play-off
2	Sparta Rotterdam	26	17	3	6	50	30	+20	37	Transferred to Eerste B
3	Emma	26	15	7	4	71	44	+27	37	Transferred to Eerste A
4	VVV Venlo	26	13	10	3	57	39	+18	36	Transferred to Eerste D
5	SVV	26	12	4	10	53	47	+6	28	Transferred to Eerste B
6	BVV Den Bosch	26	10	6	10	53	41	+12	26	Transferred to Eerste D
7	Sittardia	26	10	4	12	62	56	+6	24	Transferred to Eerste B
8	Xerxes	26	9	6	11	38	47	−9	24	Transferred to Eerste D
9	Bleijerheide	26	9	6	11	34	49	−15	24	Merged with SV Kerkrade to form Roda Sport
10	NAC	26	9	4	13	45	47	−2	22	Transferred to Eerste A
11	LONGA	26	9	3	14	38	46	−8	21	Transferred to Eerste A
12	Brabantia	26	7	6	13	38	52	−14	20	Transferred to Eerste B
13	VVH Heerlen	26	6	4	16	35	69	−34	16	Relegated to 2nd Division
14	HBS Craeyenhout	26	4	3	19	36	74	−38	11	Relegated to 2nd Division

Source: rsssf.com

=== Eerste Klasse D ===
Pos	Team	Pld	W	D	L	GF	GA	GD	Pts	Qualification or relegation
1	FC Eindhoven	26	18	5	3	62	33	+29	41	Qualified for Championship play-off
2	Willem II	26	18	2	6	80	39	+41	38	Transferred to Eerste B
3	EBOH	26	15	5	6	56	47	+9	35	Transferred to Eerste C
4	Hermes DVS	26	15	3	8	53	38	+15	33	Transferred to Eerste C
5	Feijenoord	26	13	4	9	46	31	+15	30	Transferred to Eerste C
6	NOAD	26	10	8	8	34	45	−11	28	Transferred to Eerste C
7	Juliana	26	12	3	11	50	45	+5	27	Merged with Rapid '54 to form Rapid JC
8	ADO Den Haag	26	11	3	12	38	37	+1	25	Transferred to Eerste B
9	SBV Excelsior	26	9	6	11	46	42	+4	24	Transferred to Eerste A
10	RBC Roosendaal	26	9	6	11	46	51	−5	24	
11	MVV Maastricht	26	11	1	14	53	46	+7	23	Transferred to Eerste A
12	Limburgia	26	7	3	16	38	60	−22	17	Transferred to Eerste C
13	Maurits	26	2	6	18	25	68	−43	10	Relegated to 2nd Division
14	DHC Delft	26	2	5	19	39	84	−45	9	Relegated to 2nd Division

Source: rsssf.com

=== Championship play-off ===
Pos	Team	Pld	W	D	L	GF	GA	GD	Pts	Result	EIN	DOS	PSV	DWS
1	FC Eindhoven	6	3	2	1	13	9	+4	8	Champion		3–1	2–1	2–2
2	DOS	6	2	2	2	10	11	−1	6		1–1		0–3	3–0
3	PSV Eindhoven	6	2	1	3	12	12	0	5		0–4	1–2		5–2
4	DWS	6	1	3	2	13	16	−3	5		4–1	3–3	2–2	

Source: rsssf.com
