= 1957–58 Eerste Divisie =

2nd season of the second-tier football league in Netherlands

Eerste Divisie
- Season: 1957–58
- Champions: Willem II; SHS
- Promoted: RBC Roosendaal; Leeuwarden
- Relegated: HFC EDO; Xerxes
- From Eredivisie: Willem II; FC Eindhoven
- To Eredivisie: Willem II; SHS
- Goals: 1,752
- Average goals/game: 3.65

The Dutch Eerste Divisie in the 1957–58 season was contested by 32 teams, divided in two groups. Willem II and SHS won the championship.

== New entrants and group changes ==
=== Group A ===
Promoted from the 1956–57 Tweede Divisie:

- RBC Roosendaal

Relegated from the 1956–57 Eredivisie:

- Willem II

Entered from the B-group:

- AGOVV Apeldoorn
- DFC
- EDO
- SBV Excelsior
- VV Helmond
- Vitesse Arnhem
- FC Volendam

=== Group B ===
Promoted from the 1956–57 Tweede Divisie:

- Leeuwarden

Relegated from the 1956–57 Eredivisie:

- FC Eindhoven

Transferred from the A-group:

- HFC Haarlem
- Helmondia '55
- KFC
- Limburgia
- De Volewijckers
- FC Wageningen
- Xerxes

== Eerste Divisie A ==
Pos	Team	Pld	W	D	L	GF	GA	GD	Pts	Qualification or relegation
1	Willem II	30	18	7	5	79	46	+33	43	Championship play-off as level on points
2	FC Dordrecht	30	18	7	5	71	36	+35	43	Championship play-off as level on points
3	HVC	30	18	5	7	78	37	+41	41	Moving to Eerste Divisie B next season
4	De Graafschap	30	16	3	11	63	57	+6	35	
5	Vitesse Arnhem	30	16	3	11	63	58	+5	35	Moving to Eerste Divisie B next season
6	FC Volendam	30	14	6	10	62	47	+15	34	
7	SBV Excelsior	30	14	6	10	46	42	+4	34	Moving to Eerste Divisie B next season
8	SVV	30	14	6	10	59	54	+5	34	
9	Alkmaar '54	30	13	6	11	57	51	+6	32	
10	VV Helmond	30	12	7	11	48	46	+2	31	
11	DWS	30	11	4	15	54	58	−4	26	Merged with BVC Amsterdam for next season.
12	VSV	30	8	5	17	33	61	−28	21	
13	RBC Roosendaal	30	6	7	17	40	66	−26	19	Moving to Eerste Divisie B next season
14	AGOVV Apeldoorn	30	7	5	18	41	70	−29	19	
15	Roda Sport	30	5	7	18	34	66	−32	17	Moving to Eerste Divisie B next season
16	HFC EDO	30	5	6	19	24	57	−33	16	Relegated to Tweede Divisie.

Source: rsssf.com

=== Championship play-off ===
Team 1	Score	Team 2
Willem II	3 - 1	FC Dordrecht

Willem II were promoted to the Eredivisie.

== Eerste Divisie B ==
Pos	Team	Pld	W	D	L	GF	GA	GD	Pts	Promotion or relegation
1	SHS	30	19	6	5	80	48	+32	44	Promoted to Eredivisie.
2	Stormvogels	30	19	4	7	76	48	+28	42	
3	Leeuwarden	30	17	6	7	74	45	+29	40	Moving to Eerste Divisie A next season
4	Sittardia	30	15	6	9	61	44	+17	36	
5	HFC Haarlem	30	14	3	13	47	48	−1	31	Moving to Eerste Divisie A next season
6	De Volewijckers	30	12	6	12	47	49	−2	30	
7	FC Eindhoven	30	11	7	12	62	58	+4	29	Moving to Eerste Divisie A next season
8	RCH	30	12	5	13	55	56	−1	29	
9	Limburgia	30	10	8	12	54	52	+2	28	Moving to Eerste Divisie A next season
10	FC Wageningen	30	9	10	11	67	69	−2	28	Moving to Eerste Divisie A next season
11	Helmondia '55	30	11	6	13	46	54	−8	28	
12	Hermes DVS	30	10	7	13	55	58	−3	27	
13	Fortuna Vlaardingen	30	8	9	13	51	77	−26	25	Moving to Eerste Divisie A next season
14	KFC	30	7	9	14	35	56	−21	23	
15	Rigtersbleek	30	7	8	15	51	74	−23	22	
16	Xerxes	30	6	6	18	39	64	−25	18	Relegated to Tweede Divisie.

Source: rsssf.com

== See also ==
- 1957–58 Eredivisie
- 1957–58 Tweede Divisie
