= 1959–60 Eerste Divisie =

4th season of the second-tier football league in Netherlands

Eerste Divisie
- Season: 1959–60
- Champions: GVAV; Alkmaar '54
- Promoted: 't Gooi; Veendam; DHC; Go Ahead
- Relegated: Rigtersbleek; De Graafschap
- From Eredivisie: NOAD; SHS
- To Eredivisie: GVAV; Alkmaar '54; NOAD
- Goals scored: 1,752
- Average goals/game: 3.40

The Dutch Eerste Divisie in the 1959–60 season was contested by 33 teams, divided in one group of sixteen and one group of seventeen teams. GVAV and Alkmaar '54 won the championship.

== New entrants and group changes ==
=== Eerste Divisie A ===
Promoted from the 1958–59 Tweede Divisie:

- 't Gooi
- Veendam

Relegated from the 1958–59 Eredivisie:

- TSV NOAD

Entered from the B-group:

- SBV Excelsior
- GVAV
- HVC
- KFC
- Rigtersbleek
- Stormvogels
- Vitesse Arnhem
- De Volewijckers

=== Eerste Divisie B ===
Promoted from the 1958–59 Tweede Divisie:

- DHC
- Go Ahead

Relegated from the 1958–59 Eredivisie:

- SHS (relegated as Holland Sport)

Entered from the A-group:

- AGOVV Apeldoorn
- Alkmaar '54
- DFC
- FC Eindhoven
- De Graafschap
- Leeuwarden
- Limburgia
- VSV
- ZFC

== Final tables ==
=== Eerste Divisie A ===
Pos	Team	Pld	W	D	L	GF	GA	GD	Pts	Promotion or relegation
1	GVAV	30	20	5	5	61	28	+33	45	Promoted to Eredivisie.
2	Vitesse Arnhem	30	17	9	4	61	33	+28	43	Qualified for Promotion play-offs.
3	TSV NOAD	30	17	7	6	60	39	+21	41	Qualified for Promotion play-offs.
4	BVV	30	16	7	7	54	30	+24	39	
5	Stormvogels	30	11	10	9	53	50	+3	32	
6	FC Wageningen	30	12	8	10	50	49	+1	32	Moving to Eerste Divisie B next season
7	De Volewijckers	30	13	5	12	51	42	+9	31	
8	KFC	30	11	7	12	39	40	−1	29	
9	HVC	30	11	6	13	39	45	−6	28	
10	VV Helmond	30	9	10	11	34	44	−10	28	Moving to Eerste Divisie B next season
11	SBV Excelsior	30	7	10	13	40	50	−10	24	Moving to Eerste Divisie B next season
12	Fortuna Vlaardingen	30	10	3	17	42	51	−9	23	
13	SVV	30	8	7	15	35	50	−15	23	Moving to Eerste Divisie B next season
14	't Gooi	30	7	7	16	42	54	−12	21	Moving to Eerste Divisie B next season
15	Veendam	30	8	5	17	38	55	−17	21	
16	Rigtersbleek	30	6	8	16	38	77	−39	20	Relegated to Tweede Divisie.

Source: rsssf.com

=== Eerste Divisie B ===
Pos	Team	Pld	W	D	L	GF	GA	GD	Pts	Promotion or relegation
1	Alkmaar '54	32	18	7	7	68	47	+21	43	Promoted to Eredivisie.
2	DFC	32	17	8	7	71	46	+25	42	Qualified for Promotion play-offs and Moving to Eerste Divisie A next season
3	VSV	32	19	4	9	64	47	+17	42	Qualified for Promotion play-offs.
4	Heracles	32	17	6	9	66	52	+14	40	
5	DHC	32	16	7	9	67	52	+15	39	
6	Leeuwarden	32	16	3	13	80	67	+13	35	Moving to Eerste Divisie A next season
7	SHS	32	14	6	12	64	69	−5	34	
8	ZFC	32	14	5	13	63	49	+14	33	
9	AGOVV Apeldoorn	32	15	2	15	71	61	+10	32	Moving to Eerste Divisie A next season
10	Go Ahead	32	13	6	13	62	62	0	32	
11	Hermes DVS	32	13	4	15	44	47	−3	30	Moving to Eerste Divisie A next season
12	FC Eindhoven	32	10	7	15	58	64	−6	27	
13	Helmondia '55	32	8	8	16	43	64	−21	24	Moving to Eerste Divisie A next season
14	Limburgia	32	9	7	16	52	62	−10	23 (Note: 2 points deducted.)	Moving to Eerste Divisie A next season
15	RCH	32	7	8	17	57	76	−19	22	Relegation play-off as level on points.
16	RBC Eerste A	32	9	4	19	43	67	−24	22	Relegation play-off as level on points.
17	De Graafschap	32	6	10	16	42	83	−41	22	Relegation play-off as level on points.

Source: rsssf.com

=== Promotion play-offs ===
Pos	Team	Pld	W	D	L	GF	GA	GD	Pts	Promotion
1	TSV NOAD	6	4	1	1	14	7	+7	9	Promoted to Eredivisie.
2	Vitesse Arnhem	6	2	3	1	7	5	+2	7	
3	DFC	6	2	1	3	13	9	+4	5	
4	VSV	6	1	1	4	6	15	−9	3	

Source: rsssf.com

=== Relegation play-offs ===
Pos	Team	Pld	W	D	L	GF	GA	GD	Pts	Relegation
1	RBC	2	2	0	0	5	3	+2	4	
2	RCH	2	1	0	1	3	3	0	2	
3	De Graafschap	2	0	0	2	3	5	−2	0	Relegated to Tweede Divisie.

Source: rsssf.com

== See also ==
- 1959–60 Eredivisie
- 1959–60 Tweede Divisie
