= 1954–55 Netherlands Football League Championship =

Netherl. Football Championship
- Season: 1954–1955
- Champions: Willem II (3rd title)
- European Cup: PSV Eindhoven

The Netherlands Football League Championship 1954–1955 was contested by 56 teams participating in four divisions. The national champion would be determined by a play-off featuring the winners of each division of the Netherlands. Willem II won this year's championship by beating NAC, PSV Eindhoven and FC Eindhoven.

This season saw the introduction of professional football in the Netherlands. Initially two competitions began after the summer break: one from the NBVB and one from the KNVB. In November, the NBVB merged into the KNVB and one unified league commenced.

At the end of the season, the four Eerste Klasse Divisions were re-aligned as two Divisions called Hoofdklasse A & B.

== New entrants ==
48 competitors from last season participated, only in completely other divisions. Last years competitors Bleijerheide merged to form Roda Sport and Juliana merged to form Rapid JC. New entrants were:

- Alkmaar '54
- BVC Amsterdam
- Fortuna
- DFC
- De Graafschap
- Holland Sport
- HVC
- Veendam

== Divisions ==
=== Eerste Klasse A ===
==== Table ====
Pos	Team	Pld	W	D	L	GF	GA	GD	Pts	Qualification or relegation
1	NAC	26	18	5	3	60	24	+36	41	Qualified to Championship play-off
2	Holland Sport	26	18	4	4	72	33	+39	40	Not participating next season
3	MVV Maastricht	26	14	6	6	64	37	+27	34	Transferred to Hoofdklasse B
4	SBV Excelsior	26	13	5	8	47	36	+11	31	
5	BVC Amsterdam	26	11	5	10	53	41	+12	27	
6	Emma	26	11	5	10	41	47	−6	27	Transferred to Hoofdklasse B
7	Stormvogels	26	9	8	9	49	42	+7	26	
8	DOS	26	12	2	12	60	53	+7	26	
9	Roda Sport	26	11	4	11	48	51	−3	26	
10	LONGA	26	10	3	13	55	65	−10	23	Relegated to 2nd Division
11	VV Leeuwarden	26	7	7	12	40	59	−19	21	Relegated to 2nd Division
12	Zwolsche Boys	26	5	5	16	31	59	−28	15	Relegated to 2nd Division
13	Veendam	26	4	6	16	38	85	−47	14	Relegated to 2nd Division
14	Go Ahead	26	3	7	16	27	53	−26	13	Relegated to 2nd Division

Source: rsssf.com

==== Results ====
Home \ Away	AMS	DOS	EMA	EXC	GOA	HOL	LEE	LON	MVV	NAC	RSP	STO	VEE	ZBO
Amsterdam		4–1	3–0	3–0	1–1	3–4	3–0	4–3	1–3	3–3	3–1	0–1	4–1	1–2
DOS	4–2		1–2	0–2	0–4	2–1	4–1	4–1	4–2	1–2	1–5	3–2	6–2	6–1
Emma	1–4	0–0		1–0	2–2	1–3	2–0	2–3	1–2	0–3	5–0	2–1	4–1	1–1
Excelsior	2–1	1–0	4–2		1–0	4–6	1–1	2–0	1–1	0–2	4–1	3–0	4–0	3–2
Go Ahead	1–0	1–0	3–5	3–5		0–5	0–1	1–3	1–3	0–1	1–1	1–2	0–1	0–0
Holland Sport	4–1	3–0	0–0	2–1	4–2		3–1	3–0	4–3	1–3	3–1	2–1	8–0	0–0
Leeuwarden	1–3	2–1	1–1	3–1	1–1	1–2		5–2	1–2	1–7	0–1	0–0	1–3	3–2
LONGA	0–0	1–4	0–1	2–2	3–1	0–1	2–2		3–4	0–5	1–0	2–1	4–0	7–2
MVV	1–2	5–3	6–0	0–0	4–1	1–1	2–3	5–1		2–0	5–0	4–3	1–1	4–1
NAC	2–1	1–2	3–1	1–0	0–0	3–2	5–1	2–4	0–0		3–0	2–0	4–1	3–1
Roda Sport	3–2	4–2	1–2	2–1	1–0	2–3	2–2	6–2	1–0	0–0		1–1	6–1	1–4
Stormvogels	0–0	3–3	3–0	1–1	1–1	2–1	5–2	3–2	3–0	2–3	2–5		6–1	0–0
Veendam	2–2	0–4	1–3	1–2	5–1	1–1	3–5	4–5	1–1	1–1	2–3	3–3		2–1
Zwolsche Boys	0–2	1–4	1–2	1–2	3–1	0–5	1–1	1–4	0–3	0–1	1–0	0–3	5–0	

Legend: Blue = home team win; Yellow = draw; Red = away team win.

=== Eerste Klasse B ===
==== Table ====
Pos	Team	Pld	W	D	L	GF	GA	GD	Pts	Qualification or relegation
1	Willem II	26	19	5	2	96	42	+54	43	Qualified for Championship play-off
2	Sparta Rotterdam	26	12	8	6	67	42	+25	32	Transferred to Hoofdklasse A
3	Fortuna	26	13	5	8	46	38	+8	31	Transferred to Hoofdklasse A
4	SVV	26	11	6	9	53	50	+3	28	
5	ADO Den Haag	26	10	6	10	48	43	+5	26	Transferred to Hoofdklasse A
6	Sittardia	26	10	6	10	57	52	+5	26	
7	Elinkwijk	26	11	4	11	48	45	+3	26	
8	HFC EDO	26	11	4	11	42	45	−3	26	
9	Rigtersbleek	26	10	6	10	49	58	−9	26	Transferred to Hoofdklasse A
10	DWS	26	9	6	11	35	38	−3	24	Relegated to 2nd Division
11	sc Heerenveen	26	9	5	12	56	68	−12	23	Relegated to 2nd Division
12	Heracles	26	8	5	13	56	71	−15	21	Relegated to 2nd Division
13	Brabantia	26	6	6	14	34	68	−34	18	Relegated to 2nd Division
14	FC Wageningen	26	6	2	18	33	60	−27	14	Relegated to 2nd Division

Source: rsssf.com

==== Results ====
Home \ Away	ADO	BRA	DWS	EDO	ELI	F54	HEE	HER	RIG	SIT	SPA	SVV	WAG	WIL
ADO		0–0	0–3	1–2	0–3	0–1	4–1	0–0	6–3	4–1	2–1	3–2	1–0	2–3
Brabantia	0–6		1–1	4–1	1–1	0–1	2–1	4–1	0–3	2–2	3–2	1–4	3–1	1–5
DWS	3–1	2–0		0–0	2–3	0–0	1–2	3–1	2–1	1–0	1–3	5–1	0–0	0–1
EDO	2–2	4–0	2–1		2–1	1–2	6–0	2–0	2–4	2–1	1–5	2–1	2–1	0–1
Elinkwijk	1–2	2–0	1–0	3–0		3–1	3–1	2–3	0–1	3–2	3–3	0–1	1–0	4–1
Fortuna '54	2–3	1–1	0–0	3–0	2–0		4–0	3–1	0–1	1–3	1–0	3–2	2–1	2–4
Heerenveen	2–1	6–1	0–1	1–5	1–1	1–4		6–0	1–5	2–2	3–6	4–4	4–2	1–1
Heracles	2–2	2–2	5–1	3–1	4–2	3–2	0–4		5–1	2–2	4–5	3–1	2–4	2–3
Rigtersbleek	1–0	3–2	3–2	2–2	2–2	1–3	1–5	1–1		2–2	2–2	2–3	3–1	2–2
Sittardia	3–0	0–1	2–0	5–1	5–2	3–1	3–2	5–3	1–0		1–5	2–2	1–2	7–4
Sparta	1–1	4–1	1–1	1–0	3–2	2–2	6–0	4–2	3–0	1–1		1–1	1–2	1–1
SVV	2–2	3–1	4–0	0–1	1–3	2–2	2–3	3–1	3–0	3–2	2–1		3–2	0–0
Wageningen	0–5	5–2	1–3	0–0	3–0	0–3	1–3	3–4	0–2	1–0	1–2	0–2		2–6
Willem II	4–0	7–1	5–2	3–1	4–2	6–0	2–2	5–2	8–3	5–1	4–3	6–1	5–0	

Legend: Blue = home team win; Yellow = draw; Red = away team win.

=== Eerste Klasse C ===
==== Table ====
Pos	Team	Pld	W	D	L	GF	GA	GD	Pts	Qualification or relegation
1	PSV Eindhoven	26	16	7	3	64	39	+25	39	Qualified for Championship play-off and transferred to Hoofdklasse B
2	Rapid	26	15	5	6	70	41	+29	35	Transferred to Hoofdklasse B
3	Limburgia	26	14	6	6	53	33	+20	34	Transferred to Hoofdklasse A
4	GVAV Rapiditas	26	14	5	7	69	50	+19	33	Transferred to Hoofdklasse B
5	Alkmaar '54	26	11	6	9	41	37	+4	28	Transferred to Hoofdklasse B
6	EBOH	26	12	4	10	45	50	−5	28	Transferred to Hoofdklasse A
7	Feijenoord	26	11	5	10	47	47	0	27	Transferred to Hoofdklasse B
8	Vitesse Arnhem	26	10	7	9	42	44	−2	27	Transferred to Hoofdklasse A
9	NOAD	26	8	10	8	41	36	+5	26	Transferred to Hoofdklasse A
10	HFC Haarlem	26	9	8	9	47	42	+5	26	Relegated to 2nd Division.
11	Enschedese Boys	26	6	6	14	38	67	−29	18	Relegated to 2nd Division.
12	NEC Nijmegen	26	4	9	13	33	49	−16	17	Relegated to 2nd Division.
13	Blauw-Wit Amsterdam	26	6	2	18	34	62	−28	14	Relegated to 2nd Division.
14	Hermes DVS	26	2	8	16	28	55	−27	12	Relegated to 2nd Division.

Source: rsssf.com

==== Results ====
Home \ Away	ALK	BLW	EBO	ENB	FEY	GVA	HAA	DVS	LIM	NEC	NOA	PSV	RAP	VIT
Alkmaar '54		2–0	2–1	6–1	0–1	1–2	1–3	2–1	1–0	6–1	1–1	1–1	4–3	0–0
Blauw-Wit	0–1		2–0	2–4	1–0	0–2	0–5	1–2	2–5	2–0	1–4	3–4	2–4	4–0
EBOH	1–0	5–2		1–3	1–0	2–1	3–2	1–0	3–3	3–0	1–1	2–2	3–1	2–1
Enschedese Boys	1–1	2–0	1–5		0–3	1–3	1–5	3–3	2–3	2–1	0–5	0–2	4–4	1–1
Feijenoord	2–2	3–5	0–1	1–1		4–6	2–0	5–3	1–1	2–2	2–1	0–0	3–1	2–1
GVAV	5–0	3–2	2–0	3–1	3–6		2–2	6–1	1–0	2–1	2–2	1–7	1–1	3–2
Haarlem	2–1	0–0	5–3	1–1	4–0	5–4		2–1	0–4	0–0	0–1	1–2	1–1	1–2
Hermes DVS	0–2	1–2	2–0	1–2	1–4	0–0	1–2		1–3	1–1	0–0	0–0	0–3	0–1
Limburgia	1–0	1–0	1–0	3–1	1–3	3–2	3–0	3–3		1–0	1–1	1–3	0–0	5–2
N.E.C.	0–2	4–1	1–2	3–1	0–2	3–3	2–1	1–1	1–2		0–2	3–3	1–2	2–1
NOAD	0–0	0–0	6–1	0–1	2–1	0–4	2–2	3–1	0–4	0–0		1–3	4–2	2–3
PSV	4–2	3–1	7–3	3–1	2–0	1–5	0–0	2–1	3–2	4–4	2–1		1–4	3–1
Rapid JC	5–0	4–1	4–0	3–1	5–0	3–2	4–2	4–1	2–2	1–0	3–1	0–2		5–1
Vitesse	1–3	3–0	1–1	4–2	3–0	2–1	1–1	2–2	1–0	2–2	1–1	1–0	4–1	

Legend: Blue = home team win; Yellow = draw; Red = away team win.

=== Eerste Klasse D ===
==== Table ====
Pos	Team	Pld	W	D	L	GF	GA	GD	Pts	Qualification or relegation
1	FC Eindhoven	26	17	5	4	59	26	+33	39	Qualified for Championship play-off and transferred to Hoofdklasse A
2	VVV Venlo	26	15	7	4	54	21	+33	37	Transferred to Hoofdklasse A
3	AFC Ajax	26	12	11	3	57	30	+27	35	Transferred to Hoofdklasse A
4	De Graafschap	26	13	4	9	48	35	+13	30	Transferred to Hoofdklasse B
5	SC Enschede	26	12	5	9	48	36	+12	29	Transferred to Hoofdklasse B
6	BVV Den Bosch	26	12	5	9	42	39	+3	29	Transferred to Hoofdklasse B
7	HVC	26	8	11	7	34	31	+3	27	Transferred to Hoofdklasse A
8	De Volewijckers	26	11	4	11	34	53	−19	26	Transferred to Hoofdklasse B
9	DFC	26	10	5	11	41	47	−6	25	Transferred to Hoofdklasse B
10	RBC Roosendaal	26	9	7	10	43	50	−7	25	Relegated to 2nd Division
11	VSV	26	9	6	11	43	43	0	24	Relegated to 2nd Division
12	AGOVV Apeldoorn	26	4	5	17	31	55	−24	13	Relegated to 2nd Division
13	Xerxes	26	3	7	16	23	51	−28	13	Relegated to 2nd Division
14	Be Quick 1887	26	4	4	18	24	64	−40	12	Relegated to 2nd Division

Source: rsssf.com

==== Results ====
Home \ Away	AGO	AJA	BQU	BVV	DFC	EIN	ENS	GRA	HVC	RBC	VWK	VSV	VVV	XER
AGOVV		1–4	1–1	0–3	10–0	1–3	0–6	0–2	1–1	1–4	0–1	2–0	1–3	4–1
Ajax	3–1		5–1	4–1	3–2	1–1	3–0	3–0	1–1	3–1	3–0	2–2	2–3	1–1
Be Quick	1–2	1–0		0–1	0–0	1–2	1–3	0–6	0–5	1–1	3–0	1–2	1–7	1–1
BVV	2–1	0–0	1–2		2–1	1–1	2–1	1–0	0–2	5–2	4–4	2–1	2–1	5–2
D.F.C.	3–1	5–3	2–1	1–4		2–3	4–0	1–2	1–2	0–0	5–1	2–0	0–0	1–1
Eindhoven	2–0	2–2	4–0	1–0	3–1		3–0	3–0	1–2	3–2	6–1	3–1	3–1	6–2
SC Enschede	2–2	1–1	2–1	3–1	0–1	1–0		0–2	2–0	6–0	1–0	3–1	2–2	2–0
De Graafschap	1–0	1–1	5–0	1–0	4–1	0–3	5–2		3–1	2–3	0–3	0–0	1–0	2–1
HVC	0–0	0–3	3–0	1–1	0–1	0–0	1–1	3–1		2–2	1–2	2–1	1–1	1–2
RBC	3–1	1–1	2–1	2–1	3–1	1–2	3–1	1–1	2–2		1–2	2–2	1–3	1–0
De Volewijckers	1–0	2–2	3–2	3–1	0–2	1–0	0–5	3–2	0–0	0–5		2–2	0–1	1–0
VSV	1–1	0–1	3–2	1–2	2–1	1–1	2–1	2–5	5–1	5–0	4–2		0–2	3–0
VVV	4–0	0–0	2–0	4–0	1–2	4–0	1–1	3–2	0–0	3–0	2–0	2–0		2–0
Xerxes	3–0	2–5	1–2	0–0	1–1	0–3	0–2	0–0	0–2	1–0	1–2	1–2	2–2	

Legend: Blue = home team win; Yellow = draw; Red = away team win.

=== Championship play-off ===
Pos	Team	Pld	W	D	L	GF	GA	GD	Pts	Qualification	WIL	NAC	PSV	EIN
1	Willem II (C)	6	3	2	1	14	11	+3	8			2–2	3–1	2–0
2	NAC	6	2	2	2	14	12	+2	6		3–1		0–2	2–3
3	PSV Eindhoven	6	1	4	1	10	10	0	6	Qualification for the European Cup first round	3–3	2–2		1–1
4	FC Eindhoven	6	1	2	3	9	14	−5	4		2–3	2–5	1–1	

Source: rsssf.com
(C) Champions
