= 1958–59 Tweede Divisie =

Tweede Divisie
- Season: 1958–59
- Champions: 't Gooi; Go Ahead
- Promoted: 't Gooi; DHC; Go Ahead; Veendam
- Goals scored: 1,328
- Average goals/game: 3.38

The Dutch Tweede Divisie in the 1958–59 season was contested by 29 teams, fifteen of which playing in group A, fourteen in group B. Teams occupying the lowest two places from each group at the end of the season, would have to play in a relegation play-off (however, two teams chose to relegate to amateur football immediately). That play-off would not be played this season, but in the next. The worst placed teams from that year would also enter. In the play-off (played after the 1959–60 season), teams would play against relegation to amateur football. The changes were part of an attempt by the KNVB to eventually make the Tweede Divisie one league instead of two.

== New entrants ==
Relegated from the Eerste Divisie

- HFC EDO (entered in the A-group)
- Xerxes (entered in the A-group)

Entered from amateur football

- Velox (entered in the A-group)

== Final tables ==
=== Tweede Divisie A ===
Pos	Team	Pld	W	D	L	GF	GA	GD	Pts	Promotion or relegation
1	HVV t' Gooi	28	19	3	6	84	37	+47	41	Promoted to Eerste Divisie
2	DHC Delft	28	15	9	4	52	21	+31	39	Promoted to Eerste Divisie
3	EBOH	28	17	3	8	54	39	+15	37	
4	FC Hilversum	28	13	8	7	53	31	+22	34	Tweede Divisie B next season
5	Velox	28	12	9	7	54	52	+2	33	Tweede Divisie B next season
6	UVS	28	11	8	9	47	36	+11	30	
7	LONGA	28	14	2	12	57	52	+5	30	
8	De Valk	28	12	5	11	57	50	+7	29	
9	Xerxes	28	10	7	11	46	55	−9	27	
10	HFC EDO	28	10	5	13	38	50	−12	25	
11	VV Baronie	28	9	5	14	39	53	−14	23	
12	RKVV Wilhelmina	28	7	5	16	51	68	−17	19	
13	SV Zeist	28	7	5	16	48	79	−31	19	Tweede Divisie B next season
14	ONA	28	7	4	17	36	64	−28	18	Qualified for next season's relegation play-offs
15	SV DOSKO	28	5	6	17	41	70	−29	16	Voluntarily returned to amateur football

Source: rsssf.com

=== Tweede Divisie B ===
Pos	Team	Pld	W	D	L	GF	GA	GD	Pts	Promotion or relegation
1	Go Ahead	26	18	6	2	56	18	+38	42	Promoted to Eerste Divisie
2	Veendam	26	14	4	8	41	32	+9	32	Promoted to Eerste Divisie
3	Enschedese Boys	26	12	6	8	50	31	+19	30	
4	VV Zwartemeer	26	12	6	8	45	37	+8	30	
5	Be Quick	26	11	7	8	59	44	+15	29	
6	NEC	26	10	8	8	41	31	+10	28	Tweede Divisie A next season
7	Zwolsche Boys	26	9	6	11	40	42	−2	24	
8	PEC	26	10	4	12	38	46	−8	24	
9	VV Oldenzaal	26	9	4	13	41	48	−7	22	
10	HVV Tubantia	26	6	10	10	35	45	−10	22	
11	sc Heerenveen	26	7	8	11	27	54	−27	22	
12	VV Rheden	26	6	9	11	37	42	−5	21	
13	Velocitas 1897	26	5	10	11	30	41	−11	20	Qualified for Next season's relegation play-offs
14	Oosterparkers	26	7	4	15	31	60	−29	18	Voluntarily returned to amateur football

Source: rsssf.com

== See also ==
- 1958–59 Eredivisie
- 1958–59 Eerste Divisie
