= 1956–57 Eerste Divisie =

Inaugural season of the second-tier football league in Netherlands

Eerste Divisie
- Season: 1956–57
- Champions: ADO Den Haag; Blauw-Wit Amsterdam
- Promoted: New league
- Relegated: Emma; EBOH
- From Eredivisie: New league
- To Eredivisie: ADO Den Haag; Blauw-Wit Amsterdam
- Goals scored: 1,730
- Average goals/game: 3.60

The 1956–57 Eerste Divisie was the first season in the history of the Eerste Divisie, the second tier of football in the Netherlands. The league had been divided in two, with an Eerste Divisie A and an Eerste Divisie B, each comprising 16 teams. The two champions, ADO Den Haag and Blauw-Wit Amsterdam, were promoted to the Eredivisie, while the teams finishing last in each division, Emma and EBOH, both of Dordrecht, were relegated to the Tweede Divisie.

The composition of the league was based on the results of the previous season. The teams that had finished 10th to 18th in the Hoofdklasse A and Hoofdklasse B, then the country's highest tiers, and 14 teams from the Eerste Klasse were placed in the Eerste Divisie.

== Eerste Divisie A ==
Pos	Team	Pld	W	D	L	GF	GA	GD	Pts	Promotion or relegation
1	ADO Den Haag	30	20	7	3	89	35	+54	47	Promoted to Eredivisie
2	Alkmaar '54	30	15	8	7	75	52	+23	38	
3	Limburgia	30	13	11	6	50	37	+13	37	Moved to Eerste-B
4	Xerxes	30	14	9	7	57	46	+11	37	Moved to Eerste-B
5	SVV	30	14	7	9	60	46	+14	35	
6	HVC	30	13	8	9	70	62	+8	34	
7	Helmondia '55	30	11	10	9	45	50	−5	32	Moved to Eerste-B
8	HFC Haarlem	30	9	12	9	54	47	+7	30	Moved to Eerste-B
9	VSV	30	11	8	11	44	45	−1	30	
10	De Graafschap	30	8	11	11	44	55	−11	27	
11	FC Wageningen	30	8	10	12	55	60	−5	26	Moved to Eerste-B
12	Roda Sport	30	10	6	14	48	60	−12	26	
13	KFC	30	10	5	15	56	64	−8	25	Moved to Eerste-B
14	De Volewijckers	30	9	7	14	52	64	−12	25	Moved to Eerste-B
15	DWS	30	6	9	15	37	63	−26	21	
16	Emma	30	2	6	22	30	80	−50	10	Relegated to Tweede Divisie

Source: rsssf.com

=== Match table ===
Home \ Away	ADO	ALK	DWS	EMM	GRA	HAA	H55	HVC	KFC	LIM	RJC	SVV	VLW	VSV	WAG	XER
ADO Den Haag		3–1	3–0	10–0	3–0	2–2	0–0	6–1	5–0	1–0	2–2	2–2	5–1	3–0	3–1	2–2
Alkmaar '54	0–3		2–2	2–0	5–2	3–2	1–0	4–2	2–2	5–1	5–2	2–4	4–3	1–2	1–1	5–1
DWS	1–5	1–1		3–1	1–1	2–2	2–5	1–2	3–2	1–1	3–1	1–4	1–2	1–3	0–2	1–4
Emma	1–2	2–4	3–3		1–2	0–3	0–1	1–6	1–4	0–2	2–2	2–3	3–1	0–0	5–1	1–2
De Graafschap	6–4	3–2	1–3	1–1		3–2	6–1	1–5	1–1	1–1	2–0	0–2	0–0	1–1	1–1	1–1
HFC Haarlem	1–5	1–1	3–0	3–1	1–0		1–2	1–4	1–1	3–3	5–1	2–2	1–4	0–0	4–0	0–1
Helmondia '55	1–1	1–0	0–1	2–1	1–1	2–2		1–0	3–0	2–2	2–2	1–2	3–2	0–0	2–1	1–6
HVC	1–3	3–1	3–0	1–1	1–1	1–1	6–5		3–2	3–1	3–2	3–1	4–2	1–5	1–3	1–1
KFC	0–1	1–3	3–1	3–1	6–2	1–3	2–3	4–2		1–2	2–1	1–2	1–2	0–1	2–0	2–2
Limburgia	1–3	1–1	1–1	2–0	1–0	1–1	1–1	3–2	4–1		4–1	1–0	3–1	6–0	0–0	1–4
Rapid JC	0–1	0–3	1–0	3–1	3–0	1–0	1–1	3–2	1–2	0–1		3–2	4–3	2–2	2–1	2–0
SVV	3–4	4–5	1–0	6–0	2–1	0–0	2–1	1–1	1–2	2–1	3–2		1–2	2–0	2–3	3–2
De Volewijckers	3–3	1–4	1–1	3–0	0–1	2–2	3–0	2–2	2–2	0–1	2–2	2–1		1–3	2–1	1–3
VSV	1–3	1–1	3–0	3–0	2–1	0–1	0–1	0–1	2–3	1–1	3–1	1–1	1–2		4–1	2–1
FC Wageningen	3–1	2–2	1–2	0–0	3–3	4–3	1–1	2–2	6–4	0–2	2–3	1–1	4–1	6–1		2–2
Xerxes	1–0	1–4	1–1	2–1	0–1	0–3	3–1	3–3	3–1	1–1	1–0	0–0	3–1	3–2	3–2	

Source: rsssf.com
Legend: Blue = home team win; Yellow = draw; Red = away team win.

== Eerste Divisie B ==
Pos	Team	Pld	W	D	L	GF	GA	GD	Pts	Promotion or relegation
1	Blauw-Wit Amsterdam	30	22	3	5	74	30	+44	47	Promoted to Eredivisie
2	Stormvogels	30	19	7	4	68	38	+30	45	
3	DFC	30	15	8	7	66	49	+17	38	Moved to Eerste-A
4	FC Volendam	30	14	7	9	69	50	+19	35	Moved to Eerste-A
5	Racing Club Heemstede	30	12	11	7	49	38	+11	35	
6	Sittardia	30	13	6	11	64	50	+14	32	
7	Vitesse Arnhem	30	11	9	10	52	41	+11	31	Moved to Eerste-A
8	Hermes DVS	30	12	7	11	62	58	+4	31	
9	SBV Excelsior	30	7	15	8	36	41	−5	29	Moved to Eerste-A
10	SHS	30	9	10	11	58	59	−1	28	
11	VV Helmond	30	11	4	15	53	64	−11	26	Moved to Eerste-A
12	Rigtersbleek	30	8	10	12	48	65	−17	26	
13	EDO	30	8	6	16	47	71	−24	22	Moved to Eerste-A
14	Fortuna Vlaardingen	30	7	7	16	42	63	−21	21	
15	AGOVV Apeldoorn	30	8	5	17	46	70	−24	21	Moved to Eerste-A
16	EBOH	30	3	7	20	30	77	−47	13	Relegated to Tweede Divisie

Source: rsssf.com

=== Match table ===
Home \ Away	AGO	BWA	DFC	EBO	EDO	EXC	FVL	HEL	HER	RCH	RIG	SHS	SIT	STO	VIT	VOL
AGOVV Apeldoorn		1–8	1–3	2–0	6–4	0–0	3–2	5–0	1–3	3–0	2–1	2–1	0–0	2–2	0–1	3–2
Blauw-Wit Amsterdam	3–1		1–0	3–0	2–0	2–0	0–0	3–0	4–1	2–1	2–0	0–2	3–2	2–0	1–0	5–1
DFC	4–1	3–2		5–1	4–0	2–0	3–1	2–1	3–2	0–0	2–2	1–0	1–2	3–3	0–0	3–1
EBOH	2–1	0–2	1–2		3–4	1–1	0–3	0–3	1–3	0–2	0–0	1–1	3–0	1–1	1–4	2–2
EDO	3–1	3–2	1–4	4–2		3–3	2–0	0–2	0–3	2–1	3–3	2–4	0–0	0–1	1–0	0–1
SBV Excelsior	5–3	1–1	2–1	2–0	2–2		2–1	2–1	0–0	2–2	1–1	0–4	0–0	1–1	1–2	0–3
Fortuna Vlaardingen	4–1	2–4	1–1	2–1	4–2	1–1		1–2	1–2	2–1	1–3	1–4	0–3	0–0	1–1	0–2
VV Helmond	3–1	1–3	0–0	0–2	3–0	1–0	4–2		3–3	2–2	5–2	4–1	1–0	0–2	1–2	2–5
Hermes DVS	3–0	1–0	2–4	4–0	2–2	3–1	2–4	3–2		1–1	2–2	1–3	5–2	0–3	3–1	5–3
Racing Club Heemstede	2–1	2–5	3–1	4–1	2–1	1–1	4–0	3–0	3–0		2–0	0–0	1–0	0–2	2–1	2–2
Rigtersbleek	1–1	1–2	0–0	2–1	3–2	0–2	7–2	4–2	3–3	0–2		3–2	3–2	0–2	2–1	0–4
SHS	3–1	3–4	4–4	2–2	0–1	1–1	3–0	2–2	1–1	1–1	3–3		0–3	2–4	4–3	2–0
Sittardia	2–2	1–2	3–1	6–2	1–1	0–2	2–2	5–4	4–2	3–0	4–0	4–3		1–4	1–2	3–0
Stormvogels	3–1	1–5	4–3	5–0	2–1	3–2	0–2	4–1	2–1	2–2	7–0	1–1	2–4		1–0	2–1
Vitesse Arnhem	1–0	1–1	6–1	5–0	6–3	0–0	1–1	0–1	3–1	1–1	1–1	4–1	0–5	1–2		1–1
FC Volendam	4–0	1–0	4–5	2–2	4–0	1–1	2–1	5–2	1–0	2–2	2–1	5–0	4–1	1–2	3–3	

Source: rsssf.com
Legend: Blue = home team win; Yellow = draw; Red = away team win.

== See also ==
- 1956–57 Eredivisie
- 1956–57 Tweede Divisie
