= 1960–61 Eerste Divisie =

5th season of the second-tier football league in Netherlands

Eerste Divisie
- Season: 1960–61
- Champions: FC Volendam; Blauw Wit
- Promoted: HFC EDO; Enschedese Boys; Be Quick; EBOH; SC Heerenveen
- Relegated: HFC EDO; Helmondia '55; Racing Club Heemstede
- From Eredivisie: FC Volendam; Blauw-Wit Amsterdam; Sittardia
- To Eredivisie: FC Volendam; Blauw-Wit Amsterdam; De Volewijckers
- Goals scored: 2,300
- Average goals/game: 3.76

The Dutch Eerste Divisie in the 1960–61 season was contested by 36 teams, divided in two groups. FC Volendam and Blauw-Wit Amsterdam won the championship.

== New entrants and group changes ==
=== Group A ===
Promoted from the 1959–60 Tweede Divisie:

- HFC EDO
- Enschedese Boys

Relegated from the 1959–60 Eredivisie:

- FC Volendam

Entered from the B-group:

- AGOVV Apeldoorn
- DFC
- Helmondia '55
- Hermes DVS
- Leeuwarden
- Limburgia
- RBC Roosendaal

=== Group B ===
Promoted from the 1959–60 Tweede Divisie:

- Be Quick 1887
- EBOH
- SC Heerenveen

Relegated from the 1959–60 Eredivisie:

- Blauw-Wit Amsterdam
- Sittardia

Entered from the A-group:

- Excelsior
- 't Gooi
- VV Helmond
- SVV
- FC Wageningen

== Final tables ==
=== Group A ===
Pos	Team	Pld	W	D	L	GF	GA	GD	Pts	Promotion or relegation
1	FC Volendam	34	21	7	6	82	37	+45	49	Promoted to Eredivisie.
2	De Volewijckers	34	21	5	8	86	49	+37	47	Qualified for promotion play-off.
3	KFC	34	20	6	8	66	40	+26	46	
4	Vitesse Arnhem	34	19	6	9	73	54	+19	44	
5	Enschedese Boys	34	15	9	10	95	69	+26	39	Moved to Eerste Divisie B next season
6	Limburgia	34	16	7	11	61	54	+7	39	Moved to Eerste Divisie B next season
7	Hermes DVS	34	16	5	13	49	60	−11	37	Moved to Eerste Divisie B next season
8	DFC	34	14	7	13	64	52	+12	35	
9	Hollandia Victoria Combinatie	34	13	8	13	62	55	+7	34	Moved to Eerste Divisie B next season
10	Leeuwarden	34	12	8	14	73	80	−7	32	
11	BVV	34	14	4	16	51	63	−12	32	
12	Fortuna Vlaardingen	34	12	6	16	57	62	−5	30	
13	Veendam	34	11	8	15	66	75	−9	30	
14	Stormvogels	34	12	5	17	55	73	−18	29	
15	RBC Roosendaal	34	9	9	16	68	76	−8	27	Moved to Eerste Divisie B next season
16	AGOVV Apeldoorn	34	9	9	16	70	81	−11	27	
17	HFC EDO	34	8	5	21	47	88	−41	21	Qualified for relegation play-off.
18	Helmondia '55	34	4	6	24	47	104	−57	14	Relegated to Tweede Divisie.

Source: rsssf.com

=== Group B ===
Pos	Team	Pld	W	D	L	GF	GA	GD	Pts	Promotion or relegation
1	Blauw-Wit Amsterdam	34	28	5	1	110	34	+76	61	Promoted to Eredivisie.
2	DHC	34	21	9	4	70	26	+44	51	Qualified for promotion play-off.
3	Heracles	34	23	3	8	115	47	+68	49	
4	SBV Excelsior	34	15	7	12	72	58	+14	37	
5	Sittardia	34	15	7	12	61	63	−2	37	Moved to Eerste Divisie A next season.
6	SVV	34	14	7	13	52	60	−8	35	Moved to Eerste Divisie A next season.
7	sc Heerenveen	34	14	5	15	70	47	+23	33	
8	ZFC	34	13	7	14	51	52	−1	33	
9	't Gooi	34	13	7	14	51	72	−21	33	Moved to Eerste Divisie A next season.
10	FC Wageningen	34	14	4	16	70	76	−6	32	
11	Be Quick 1887	34	11	9	14	65	74	−9	31	
12	VSV	34	12	5	17	51	69	−18	29	
13	FC Eindhoven	34	8	11	15	46	68	−22	27	Moved to Eerste Divisie A next season.
14	SHS	34	9	8	17	50	63	−13	26	
15	Go Ahead	34	8	10	16	51	80	−29	26	Moved to Eerste Divisie A next season.
16	EBOH	34	9	7	18	44	89	−45	25	
17	VV Helmond	34	9	6	19	41	69	−28	24	Qualified for relegation play-off.
18	Racing Club Heemstede	34	8	7	19	55	78	−23	23	Relegated to Tweede Divisie.

Source: rsssf.com

== Eredivisie/Eerste Divisie play-offs ==
=== Promotion play-off ===
Team 1	Agg.	Team 2	1st leg	2nd leg
(Group A) De Volewijckers	5–3	DHC (Group B)	2–2	3–1

DHC moved to Eerste Divisie A next season.

=== Promotion/relegation play-off ===
Team 1	Agg.	Team 2	1st leg	2nd leg
De Volewijckers	8–7	Elinkwijk (Eredivisie)	4–3	4–4

De Volewijckers were promoted to the Eredivisie.

== Eerste Divisie/Tweede Divisie play-offs ==
=== Relegation play-off ===
Team 1	Score	Team 2
(Group B) VV Helmond	6–2	HFC EDO (Group A)

VV Helmond moved to Eerste Divisie A next season.

=== Promotion/relegation play-off ===
Team 1	Score	Team 2
(Tweede Divisie) RKVV Wilhelmina	3–2	HFC EDO

HFC EDO were relegated to the Tweede Divisie.

== See also ==
- 1960–61 Eredivisie
- 1960–61 Tweede Divisie
