= Diekman Stadion =

Football stadium in Enschede, Netherlands

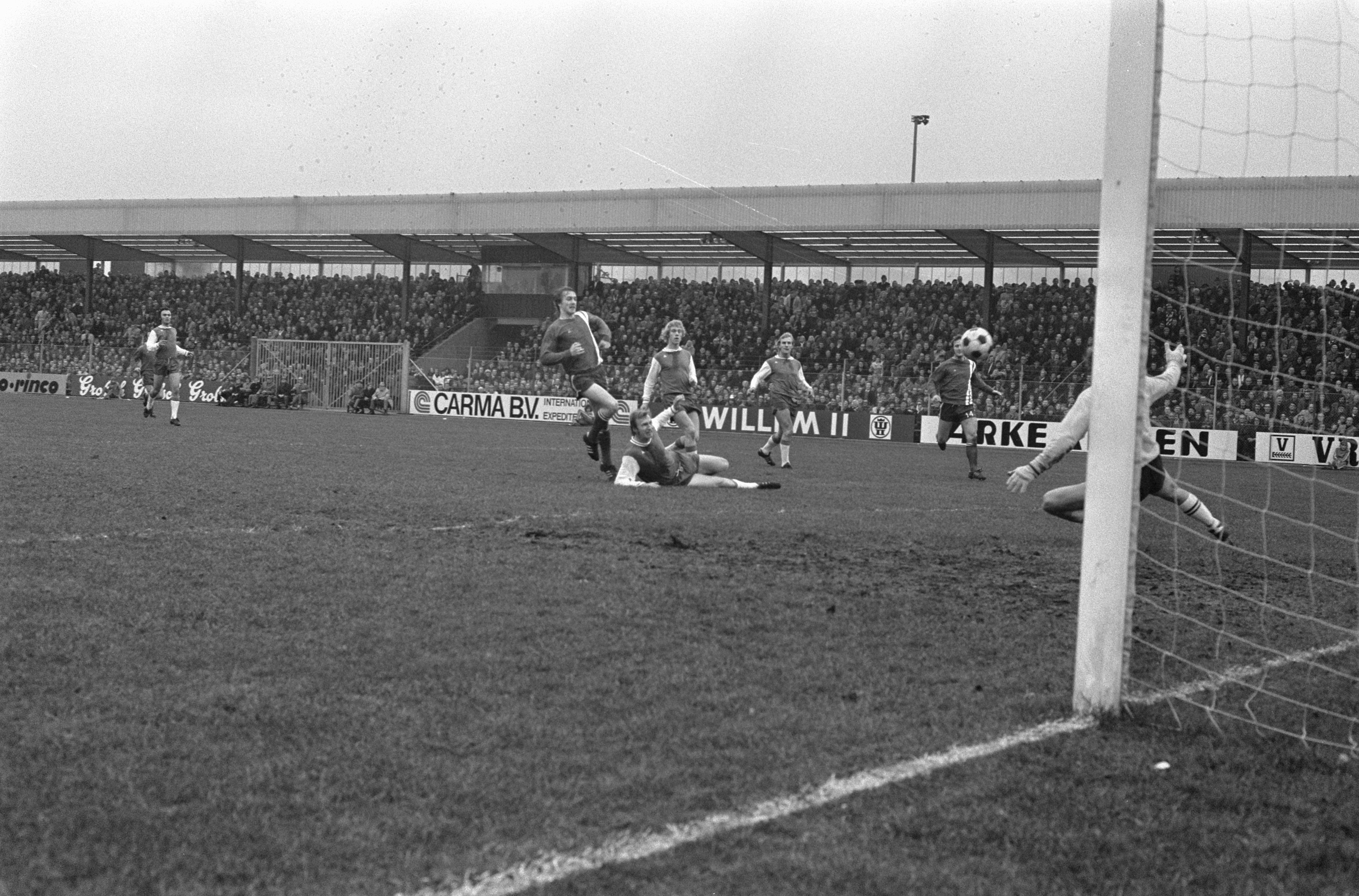
- Twente vs Feyenoord at Diekman Stadion in 1974
- Interactive map of Diekman Stadion
- Location: Enschede, Netherlands
- Owner: FC Twente
- Capacity: 13,500
- Surface: Grass

Construction
- Groundbreaking: 1953
- Opened: 8 August 1956
- Closed: 22 April 1998
- Cost: 3 million guilders

Tenant
- FC Twente (1956–1998)

Diekman Stadion (Dutch pronunciation: [ˈdikmɑn ˌstaːdijɔn]) was a multi-use stadium in Enschede, Netherlands. It was used mostly for football matches. The stadium was able to hold 13,500 people and opened in 1956. The stadium closed in 1998 when the Arke Stadion opened.

== History ==
When construction of the stadium started it was not yet known which football club would make it its home ground. VV Rigtersbleek, Enschedese Boys and Sportclub Enschede were interested. Enschedese Boys were champions of eastern Netherlands in 1950 and appeared to have the best claim on the stadium. The city council of Enschede pushed for the clubs to merge but this was refused by the three clubs.

On 8 August 1956 the Diekman was opened with a match between Sportclub Enschede and Preußen Münster from Germany attended by 22,000 spectators. Abe Lenstra scored the first goal from a penalty and the match ended in a 3–0 win for Sportclub Enschede.

In 1965 Sportclub Enschede merged with Enschedese Boys to create FC Twente and on 12 August 1965 FC Twente became the occupant of the Diekman stadium in a friendly match against Aston Villa.

On 3 November 1968 FC Twente won a home match against Ajax with 5-1 for a home crowd of 26,500 spectators which was the attendance record for the Diekman.

On 22 April 1998 the last match was played in the stadium when FC Twente beat SC Heerenveen with 3–1 in front of 10,000 spectators. Martijn Abbenhues scored the last goal in the Diekman. FC Twente moved to the newly built Arke Stadium which was later expanded to form the current Grolsch Veste.

The last sporting event in the Diekman was the 30th Marathon of Enschede on 7 June 1998 won by Ahmed Salah and the stadium was subsequently demolished.
