= 1958–59 Eerste Divisie =

3rd season of the second-tier football league in Netherlands

Eerste Divisie
- Season: 1958–59
- Champions: FC Volendam; Sittardia
- Promoted: ZFC; Heracles
- Relegated: HFC Haarlem; Roda Sport
- From Eredivisie: BVV; GVAV
- To Eredivisie: FC Volendam; Sittardia
- Goals scored: 1,625
- Average goals/game: 3.61

The Dutch Eerste Divisie in the 1958–59 season was contested by 31 teams, divided in one group of sixteen teams and one of fifteen. One team less participated this year, due to the merger of DWS with eredivisie-club BVC Amsterdam. FC Volendam and Sittardia won the championship.

== New entrants and group changes ==
=== Eerste Divisie A ===
Promoted from the 1957–58 Tweede Divisie:

- ZFC

Relegated from the 1957–58 Eredivisie:

- BVV

Entered from the B-group:

- FC Eindhoven
- Fortuna Vlaardingen
- HFC Haarlem
- Leeuwarden
- Limburgia &
- FC Wageningen

=== Eerste Divisie B ===
Promoted from the 1957–58 Tweede Divisie:

- Heracles

Relegated from the 1957–58 Eredivisie:

- GVAV

Entered from the A-group:

- Excelsior
- HVC
- RBC Roosendaal
- Roda Sport &
- Vitesse Arnhem

== Final tables ==
=== Eerste Divisie A ===
| Pos | Team | Pld | W | D | L | GF | GA | GD | Pts | Promotion or relegation |
|---|---|---|---|---|---|---|---|---|---|---|
| 1 | FC Volendam | 30 | 21 | 4 | 5 | 72 | 31 | +41 | 46 | Promoted to Eredivisie. |
| 2 | Leeuwarden | 30 | 19 | 4 | 7 | 80 | 45 | +35 | 42 | Moving to Eerste Divisie B next season |
| 3 | AGOVV Apeldoorn | 30 | 16 | 4 | 10 | 57 | 48 | +9 | 36 | Moving to Eerste Divisie B next season |
| 4 | Alkmaar '54 | 30 | 14 | 7 | 9 | 49 | 40 | +9 | 35 | Moving to Eerste Divisie B next season |
| 5 | SVV | 30 | 15 | 4 | 11 | 49 | 50 | −1 | 34 | |
| 6 | Limburgia | 30 | 13 | 7 | 10 | 52 | 44 | +8 | 33 | Moving to Eerste Divisie B next season |
| 7 | FC Eindhoven | 30 | 12 | 7 | 11 | 62 | 52 | +10 | 31 | Moving to Eerste Divisie B next season |
| 8 | BVV | 30 | 11 | 9 | 10 | 59 | 54 | +5 | 31 | |
| 9 | VV Helmond | 30 | 13 | 4 | 13 | 58 | 50 | +8 | 30 | |
| 10 | DFC | 30 | 11 | 7 | 12 | 58 | 53 | +5 | 29 | Moving to Eerste Divisie B next season |
| 11 | Fortuna Vlaardingen | 30 | 11 | 4 | 15 | 51 | 75 | −24 | 26 | |
| 12 | ZFC | 30 | 9 | 6 | 15 | 53 | 57 | −4 | 24 | Moving to Eerste Divisie B next season |
| 13 | FC Wageningen | 30 | 8 | 6 | 16 | 59 | 88 | −29 | 22 | |
| 14 | De Graafschap | 30 | 7 | 7 | 16 | 42 | 65 | −23 | 21 | Moving to Eerste Divisie B next season |
| 15 | VSV | 30 | 7 | 7 | 16 | 32 | 55 | −23 | 21 | Moving to Eerste Divisie B next season |
| 16 | HFC Haarlem | 30 | 7 | 5 | 18 | 44 | 70 | −26 | 19 | Relegated to Tweede Divisie. |

Source: rsssf.com

=== Eerste Divisie B ===
| Pos | Team | Pld | W | D | L | GF | GA | GD | Pts | Promotion or relegation |
|---|---|---|---|---|---|---|---|---|---|---|
| 1 | Sittardia | 28 | 18 | 5 | 5 | 71 | 32 | +39 | 41 | Promoted to Eredivisie. |
| 2 | Stormvogels | 28 | 17 | 6 | 5 | 76 | 41 | +35 | 40 | Moving to Eerste Divisie A next season |
| 3 | GVAV | 28 | 17 | 5 | 6 | 55 | 32 | +23 | 39 | Moving to Eerste Divisie A next season |
| 4 | HVC | 28 | 17 | 3 | 8 | 60 | 47 | +13 | 37 | Moving to Eerste Divisie A next season |
| 5 | Hermes DVS | 28 | 10 | 11 | 7 | 48 | 36 | +12 | 31 | |
| 6 | Excelsior | 28 | 9 | 9 | 10 | 35 | 39 | −4 | 27 | Moving to Eerste Divisie A next season |
| 7 | Heracles | 28 | 11 | 4 | 13 | 54 | 53 | +1 | 26 | |
| 8 | KFC | 28 | 10 | 6 | 12 | 48 | 54 | −6 | 26 | Moving to Eerste Divisie A next season |
| 9 | RBC | 28 | 10 | 5 | 13 | 46 | 52 | −6 | 25 | |
| 10 | Vitesse Arnhem | 28 | 8 | 8 | 12 | 50 | 60 | −10 | 24 | Moving to Eerste Divisie A next season |
| 11 | Helmondia '55 | 28 | 8 | 8 | 12 | 46 | 56 | −10 | 24 | |
| 12 | De Volewijckers | 28 | 8 | 7 | 13 | 41 | 44 | −3 | 23 | Moving to Eerste Divisie A next season |
| 13 | RCH | 28 | 8 | 4 | 16 | 35 | 61 | −26 | 20 | |
| 14 | Rigtersbleek | 28 | 7 | 5 | 16 | 48 | 73 | −25 | 19 | Moving to Eerste Divisie A next season |
| 15 | Roda Sport | 28 | 8 | 2 | 18 | 35 | 68 | −33 | 18 | Relegated to Tweede Divisie. |

Source: rsssf.com

== See also ==
- 1958–59 Eredivisie
- 1958–59 Tweede Divisie
