= 1959–60 Tweede Divisie =

Tweede Divisie
- Season: 1959–60
- Champions: HFC EDO; Be Quick
- Promoted: HFC EDO; EBOH; Be Quick; Enschedese Boys
- Relegated: Xerxes; Velocitas 1897; VV Rheden; ONA
- Goals scored: 940
- Average goals/game: 3.26

The Dutch Tweede Divisie in the 1959–60 season was contested by 25 teams, twelve of which playing in group A, thirteen in group B.

Eight teams would play against relegation this season in a play-off. Two teams already had to play in it on the basis of last season's results: ONA and Velocitas 1897. The other six participants were the lowest ranked teams of this season. The changes were part of an attempt by the KNVB to make the Tweede Divisie one league next year. Also, one extra team would be promoted to the Eerste Divisie this year, through a play-off between the third-place finishers of both groups.

== New entrants and group changes ==
=== Tweede Divisie A ===
Relegated from the Eerste Divisie

- HFC Haarlem
- Roda Sport

Entered from the B-group:

- NEC

=== Tweede Divisie B ===
Entered from the A-group:

- FC Hilversum
- Velox
- SV Zeist

== Final tables ==
=== Tweede Divisie A ===
Pos	Team	Pld	W	D	L	GF	GA	GD	Pts	Promotion or qualification
1	HFC EDO	22	14	3	5	38	38	0	31	Promoted to Eerste Divisie
2	Roda Sport	22	11	6	5	43	22	+21	28	Promotion play-off as level on points
3	EBOH	22	11	6	5	40	30	+10	28	Promotion play-off as level on points
4	Haarlem	22	10	6	6	45	33	+12	26	
5	De Valk	22	10	2	10	35	40	−5	22	
6	RKVV Wilhelmina	22	9	3	10	37	29	+8	21	
7	LONGA	22	5	10	7	43	42	+1	20	
8	NEC	22	9	2	11	33	35	−2	20	
9	ONA	22	8	2	12	35	52	−17	18	Qualified for Relegation play-offs based on last season
10	UVS	22	6	7	9	36	40	−4	17 (Note: 2 points deducted.)	Qualified for Relegation play-offs
11	VV Baronie	22	6	5	11	33	44	−11	17	Qualified for Relegation play-offs
12	Xerxes	22	5	4	13	26	39	−13	14	Qualified for Relegation play-offs

Source: rsssf.com

=== Tweede Divisie B ===
Pos	Team	Pld	W	D	L	GF	GA	GD	Pts	Promotion or qualification
1	Be Quick	24	12	7	5	40	29	+11	31	Promoted to Eerste Divisie
2	sc Heerenveen	24	12	4	8	48	29	+19	28	Promotion play-off as level on points
3	Enschedese Boys	24	10	8	6	44	32	+12	28	Promotion play-off as level on points
4	Velox	24	11	5	8	41	41	0	27	
5	Velocitas 1897	24	10	4	10	46	35	+11	24	Qualified for Relegation play-offs based on last season
6	PEC	24	10	4	10	35	44	−9	24	
7	HVV Tubantia	24	8	7	9	42	42	0	23	
8	SV Zeist	24	8	7	9	32	45	−13	23	
9	FC Hilversum	24	6	10	8	26	33	−7	22	
10	VV Oldenzaal	24	7	8	9	34	44	−10	22	
11	VV Rheden	24	6	9	9	31	34	−3	21	Qualified for Relegation play-offs
12	Zwolsche Boys	24	7	6	11	37	42	−5	20	Qualified for Relegation play-offs
13	VV Zwartemeer	24	7	5	12	40	46	−6	19	Qualified for Relegation play-offs

Source: rsssf.com

=== Promotion play-offs / Tweede Divisie A ===
Team 1	Score	Team 2
EBOH	2 - 1 (a.e.t.)	Roda Sport

EBOH were promoted to Eerste Divisie.

=== Promotion play-offs / Tweede Divisie B ===
Team 1	Score	Team 2
Enschedese Boys	2 - 0 (a.e.t.)	sc Heerenveen

Enschedese Boys were promoted to Eerste Divisie.

The two losing sides played off for the final promotion spot:

Team 1	Agg.	Team 2	1st leg	2nd leg
sc Heerenveen	4 - 0	Roda Sport	4 - 0	0 - 0

sc Heerenveen were promoted to Eerste Divisie.

=== Relegation play-offs ===
Pos	Team	Pld	W	D	L	GF	GA	GD	Pts	Qualification or relegation
1	VV Zwartemeer	14	7	6	1	23	11	+12	20	
2	UVS	14	8	3	3	28	12	+16	19	
3	Zwolsche Boys	14	6	7	1	25	17	+8	19	
4	VV Baronie	14	6	1	7	19	20	−1	13	Relegation play-off as level on points
5	Xerxes	14	5	3	6	18	19	−1	13	Relegation play-off as level on points
6	Velocitas 1897	14	4	5	5	17	20	−3	13	Relegation play-off as level on points
7	VV Rheden	14	3	4	7	14	25	−11	10	Relegated to amateur football
8	ONA	14	2	1	11	12	32	−20	5	Relegated to amateur football

Source: rsssf.com

=== Play-off ===
Pos	Team	Pld	W	D	L	GF	GA	GD	Pts	Relegation
1	VV Baronie	2	2	0	0	2	0	+2	4	
2	Xerxes	2	1	0	1	4	1	+3	2	Relegated to amateur football
3	Velocitas 1897	2	0	0	2	0	5	−5	0	Relegated to amateur football

Source: rsssf.com

== See also ==
- 1959–60 Eredivisie
- 1959–60 Eerste Divisie
