= 1960–61 Tweede Divisie =

Tweede Divisie
- Season: 1960–61
- Champions: HFC Haarlem
- Promoted: HFC Haarlem; FC Hilversum; RKVV Wilhelmina
- Relegated: SV Zeist; De Valk
- Goals scored: 1,149
- Average goals/game: 3.75

The Dutch Tweede Divisie in the 1960–61 season was contested by 18 teams, that would for the first time play in one league instead of two.

Two teams would be directly promoted to the Eerste Divisie. The 3rd- and 4th-place finishers would play against one another and the winner would take on a team from the Eerste Divisie itself.

== New entrants ==
Relegated from the Eerste Divisie

- Rigtersbleek
- De Graafschap

== League standings ==
Pos	Team	Pld	W	D	L	GF	GA	GD	Pts	Promotion or relegation
1	Haarlem	34	21	8	5	85	39	+46	50	Promoted to Eerste Divisie
2	FC Hilversum	34	19	10	5	85	48	+37	48	Promoted to Eerste Divisie
3	RKVV Wilhelmina	34	19	6	9	82	60	+22	44	Qualified for promotion play-offs
4	NEC	34	19	5	10	81	55	+26	43	Qualified for promotion play-offs
5	VV Baronie	34	18	6	10	68	42	+26	42	
6	Roda Sport	34	19	2	13	72	49	+23	40	
7	VV Zwartemeer	34	13	13	8	72	59	+13	39	
8	Velox	34	14	8	12	67	63	+4	36	
9	LONGA	34	15	6	13	78	76	+2	36	
10	VV Oldenzaal	34	14	6	14	52	61	−9	34	
11	De Graafschap	34	11	9	14	58	61	−3	31	
12	HVV Tubantia	34	10	8	16	66	75	−9	28	
13	Zwolsche Boys	34	8	12	14	32	48	−16	28	
14	UVS	34	8	11	15	48	62	−14	27	
15	Rigtersbleek	34	11	4	19	56	79	−23	26	Voluntarily returned to amateur football
16	PEC	34	10	5	19	54	83	−29	25	
17	SV Zeist	34	6	7	21	43	91	−48	19	Relegated to amateur football
18	De Valk	34	6	4	24	51	99	−48	16	Relegated to amateur football

Source: rsssf.com

== Promotion/relegation ==
=== Relegation play-off ===
Team 1	Score	Team 2
RKVV Wilhelmina	4–2	NEC

=== Promotion/relegation play-off ===
Team 1	Score	Team 2
RKVV Wilhelmina	3–2	HFC EDO (Eerste Divisie)

RKVV Wilhelmina were promoted to the Eerste Divisie.

== See also ==
- 1960–61 Eredivisie
- 1960–61 Eerste Divisie
