= 1961–62 Eredivisie =

6th season of the Eredivisie

Eredivisie
- Season: 1961–62
- Champions: Feijenoord (7th title)
- Promoted: Blauw-Wit Amsterdam; FC Volendam; De Volewijckers
- Relegated: DWS; VVV '03; Rapid JC
- European Cup: Feijenoord
- Cup Winners' Cup: Sparta Rotterdam
- Goals: 1,075
- Average goals/game: 3.51
- Top goalscorer: (Netherlands) Dick Tol - FC Volendam 27 gls.

The Dutch Eredivisie in the 1961–62 season was contested by 18 teams. Feijenoord won the championship.

== League standings ==
Pos	Team	Pld	W	D	L	GF	GA	GD	Pts	Qualification or relegation
1	Feijenoord	34	20	10	4	88	35	+53	50	Qualified for 1962–63 European Cup
2	PSV Eindhoven	34	21	7	6	85	43	+42	49	
3	Blauw-Wit Amsterdam	34	16	9	9	71	54	+17	41	
4	AFC Ajax	34	16	7	11	80	59	+21	39	
5	NAC	34	15	8	11	60	49	+11	38	
6	MVV Maastricht	34	12	12	10	55	46	+9	36	
7	FC Volendam	34	15	4	15	69	76	−7	34	
8	Willem II	34	14	5	15	63	52	+11	33	
9	Sparta Rotterdam	34	12	9	13	46	50	−4	33	Qualified for 1962–63 European Cup Winners' Cup
10	DOS	34	10	12	12	61	62	−1	32	
11	De Volewijckers	34	13	6	15	68	87	−19	32	
12	Fortuna '54	34	11	9	14	57	61	−4	31	
13	GVAV	34	8	14	12	48	61	−13	30	
14	SC Enschede	34	11	8	15	55	69	−14	30	
15	ADO	34	9	11	14	58	69	−11	29	
16	DWS	34	7	14	13	38	63	−25	28	Relegated to Eerste Divisie
17	VVV '03	34	10	7	17	38	62	−24	27	Relegated to Eerste Divisie
18	Rapid JC	34	6	8	20	35	77	−42	20	Relegated to Eerste Divisie

Source: rsssf.com

== Results ==
Home \ Away	ADO	AJA	BLW	DOS	DWA	ENS	FEY	F54	GVA	MVV	NAC	PSV	RAP	SPA	VOL	VWK	VVV	WIL
ADO		1–3	1–4	1–2	3–0	2–2	0–2	2–1	2–2	0–1	2–3	1–1	4–1	1–0	2–1	2–1	5–1	0–3
Ajax	1–2		2–2	3–2	8–0	6–1	1–3	3–4	4–2	0–2	2–0	4–5	2–2	3–0	9–1	2–1	3–1	3–2
Blauw-Wit	0–0	2–2		2–1	1–2	1–1	1–1	7–0	2–1	3–1	0–2	1–2	3–1	3–0	4–2	5–1	2–1	2–0
DOS	2–2	2–2	2–0		2–2	2–3	0–0	2–3	2–1	3–3	2–3	1–1	5–0	3–2	6–2	4–1	1–1	3–1
DWS/A	4–2	0–0	0–2	0–0		2–2	2–3	2–1	2–0	1–0	0–3	0–0	0–0	0–0	1–1	2–2	1–1	0–2
SC Enschede	4–1	2–0	2–1	3–4	6–1		3–3	1–1	0–1	1–6	3–1	0–1	1–2	0–0	2–3	5–3	2–0	2–4
Feijenoord	1–1	1–2	9–1	3–0	5–2	2–0		1–1	7–4	3–2	4–1	1–1	3–0	3–0	3–0	6–0	3–0	0–2
Fortuna '54	3–0	2–2	0–0	2–2	2–2	5–0	1–4		0–3	2–2	0–2	1–3	0–1	1–0	6–1	5–2	4–1	1–3
GVAV	3–1	1–0	2–2	3–0	3–2	1–1	1–1	0–0		2–2	2–2	3–2	2–1	0–3	1–3	2–2	1–1	2–2
MVV	3–1	2–4	5–3	1–1	0–0	1–2	0–0	3–1	0–0		2–2	1–1	0–0	1–1	3–0	2–1	1–0	1–0
NAC	1–1	1–3	0–1	2–0	1–1	3–0	2–3	0–0	0–0	1–0		1–3	1–1	3–2	4–1	1–2	4–1	2–0
PSV	6–1	2–2	2–1	0–1	2–1	1–1	0–3	0–1	4–0	2–1	4–1		7–1	4–0	5–1	4–2	2–1	3–2
Rapid JC	3–3	1–2	2–3	3–3	0–1	0–1	1–6	0–3	1–0	0–0	2–5	1–0		0–2	1–3	4–1	3–0	1–5
Sparta	2–2	4–0	0–0	0–0	2–0	0–2	1–3	3–1	3–1	1–0	3–3	0–5	3–0		4–2	2–2	2–0	4–2
Volendam	3–2	4–0	2–4	4–0	0–0	4–1	1–1	2–1	5–2	2–3	3–1	3–1	3–0	1–0		1–2	5–0	3–2
De Volewijckers	2–7	3–1	3–3	3–0	3–5	3–1	3–0	2–4	1–1	2–0	0–3	3–6	3–2	3–0	2–1		1–0	2–1
VVV	1–1	1–0	1–5	3–2	3–1	2–0	1–0	3–0	2–0	2–3	1–0	1–3	2–0	1–1	0–0	1–1		2–4
Willem II	2–2	0–1	3–0	2–1	3–1	2–0	0–0	2–0	1–1	4–3	0–1	1–2	0–0	0–1	3–1	4–5	1–2	

Legend: Blue = home team win; Yellow = draw; Red = away team win.

== Attendances ==
#	Club	Average	Change
1	Feijenoord	41,882	+2.4
2	ADO	15,971	+6.9
3	Ajax	15,176	−8.5
4	Sparta	14,647	−8.1
5	PSV	13,529	+1.8
6	Blauw-Wit	13,265	+90.6
7	Volendam	12,059	+70.1
8	DWS	10,853	−14.6
9	GVAV	10,824	−14.4
10	Willem II	9,765	+9.6
11	NAC	9,059	−14.0
12	De Volewijckers	9,029	+66.8
13	Fortuna	8,912	−7.3
14	Enschede	8,912	−6.8
15	DOS	8,676	−27.9
16	MVV	6,941	−16.5
17	VVV	4,853	−29.4
18	Rapid	3,753	−40.9

== See also ==
- 1961–62 Eerste Divisie
- 1961–62 Tweede Divisie
