= 1956–57 Eredivisie =

1st season of the Eredivisie

Eredivisie
- Season: 1956–57
- Champions: AFC Ajax (9th title)
- Promoted: New league
- Relegated: Willem II; Eindhoven
- European Cup: AFC Ajax
- Goals: 1,139
- Average goals/game: 3.72
- Top goalscorer: (Netherlands) Coen Dillen; PSV Eindhoven - 43 goals
- Biggest home win: BVV - NAC: 8-0
- Biggest away win: Multiple
- Highest scoring: PSV - Eindhoven: 7-4

The 1956–57 season of the Eredivisie was the first edition of a national professional men's football team competition in the Netherlands. It was contested by 18 teams, and Ajax won the championship.

== League standings ==
Pos	Team	Pld	W	D	L	GF	GA	GD	Pts	Qualification or relegation
1	AFC Ajax	34	22	5	7	64	40	+24	49	Qualified for 1957–58 European Cup
2	Fortuna '54	34	20	5	9	76	48	+28	45	Winners of the 1956–57 KNVB Cup
3	SC Enschede	34	15	11	8	81	47	+34	41	
4	MVV Maastricht	34	15	10	9	53	42	+11	40	
5	PSV Eindhoven	34	18	3	13	93	71	+22	39	
6	Feijenoord	34	15	9	10	79	58	+21	39	
7	VVV '03	34	16	6	12	50	53	−3	38	
8	Sparta Rotterdam	34	12	12	10	66	59	+7	36	
9	NAC	34	14	8	12	59	61	−2	36	
10	DOS	34	17	1	16	79	75	+4	35	
11	Rapid JC	34	13	7	14	64	63	+1	33	
12	NOAD	34	12	7	15	54	64	−10	31	
13	BVC Amsterdam	34	11	8	15	49	67	−18	30	
14	GVAV	34	9	10	15	52	66	−14	28	
15	BVV	34	11	4	19	70	76	−6	26	
16	Elinkwijk	34	10	4	20	52	87	−35	24	
17	Willem II	34	8	6	20	59	79	−20	22	Relegated to Eerste Divisie
18	FC Eindhoven	34	8	4	22	39	83	−44	20	Relegated to Eerste Divisie

== Results ==
Home \ Away	AJX	AMS	BVV	DOS	EIN	ELI	FEI	FOR	GVA	MVV	NAC	NOA	PSV	RJC	ENS	SPA	VVV	WIL
Ajax		2–3	1–0	1–2	3–1	1–0	1–0	0–2	4–2	2–0	1–0	2–1	1–0	1–0	1–1	1–2	1–1	5–0
Amsterdam	1–5		3–2	1–2	2–1	1–2	2–1	1–1	0–1	3–0	0–1	1–0	1–3	0–5	0–2	1–1	4–1	0–6
BVV	3–1	5–2		4–0	1–3	1–2	0–5	1–3	1–2	2–0	8–0	6–0	0–3	3–1	2–2	2–2	1–4	3–2
DOS	0–2	3–2	1–3		0–1	2–3	4–0	3–1	7–1	1–2	4–1	3–1	2–8	2–0	1–4	2–3	1–3	4–1
Eindhoven	0–3	1–1	2–3	0–1		1–0	0–1	1–5	1–1	0–3	2–2	3–1	0–2	0–2	3–2	0–2	0–2	2–3
Elinkwijk	1–2	0–2	4–2	1–6	5–2		5–1	2–2	0–5	0–0	2–1	2–3	0–6	1–4	2–5	1–3	2–2	3–1
Feijenoord	7–3	2–2	5–1	5–1	4–0	3–1		4–0	2–1	2–2	2–2	5–2	2–0	2–3	2–2	0–3	3–0	2–1
Fortuna '54	2–3	3–0	4–1	4–1	4–1	8–1	3–2		3–2	1–1	2–1	0–3	1–3	5–0	4–1	1–1	3–1	0–1
GVAV	1–1	1–1	3–2	3–2	1–1	1–2	4–2	2–0		0–0	1–2	2–0	1–5	1–3	0–3	2–2	5–3	0–3
MVV	1–1	2–0	3–0	2–5	3–0	2–0	0–0	1–0	2–0		1–3	3–0	5–0	2–0	0–0	3–2	1–0	0–0
NAC	1–1	3–1	1–0	4–4	0–1	2–1	1–1	0–2	2–0	2–1		2–2	3–0	1–1	1–1	3–4	3–1	2–1
NOAD	1–4	1–3	0–0	4–2	2–0	3–3	0–0	1–2	3–2	0–0	2–1		2–3	3–2	3–1	3–0	1–2	1–0
PSV	2–3	2–2	2–5	3–2	7–4	0–3	3–1	1–2	5–2	1–3	2–5	3–3		4–1	1–5	3–1	0–1	3–1
Rapid JC	4–2	2–2	4–3	0–3	0–1	2–1	4–1	0–1	2–2	1–1	5–1	1–3	3–1		1–1	0–0	2–0	3–3
SC Enschede	0–1	1–2	4–1	1–2	6–1	4–2	2–3	4–1	1–1	7–2	3–0	1–1	2–2	5–2		1–1	0–0	5–1
Sparta	1–2	1–1	3–3	4–2	6–0	3–0	0–4	0–0	2–2	3–2	1–4	2–1	3–4	4–3	2–0		1–1	3–1
VVV '03	0–0	3–2	3–1	0–1	2–1	2–1	2–2	2–3	1–0	1–3	1–0	2–1	1–5	2–1	0–1	2–1		3–1
Willem II	0–1	1–2	1–0	2–3	3–2	4–0	3–3	2–3	0–0	5–2	2–4	1–2	0–6	1–2	2–2	0–0	6–3	

Legend: Blue = home team win; Yellow = draw; Red = away team win.

== Attendances ==
#	Club	Average	Change
1	Feijenoord	42,559	+20.8
2	Amsterdam	18,324	+27.9
3	Ajax	18,000	+12.9
4	Sparta	16,059	+6.2
5	Enschede	15,765	+7.2
6	Fortuna	13,588	+21.3
7	PSV	12,294	+14.8
8	DOS	12,147	+21.3
9	GVAV	11,688	+26.3
10	Willem II	10,794	+10.9
11	NAC	10,029	+3.3
12	BVV	10,012	+2.8
13	MVV	9,500	+8.8
14	Eindhoven	9,235	0.0
15	Elinkwijk	9,176	−8.2
16	Rapid	7,776	−7.9
17	VVV	7,088	−1.6
18	NOAD	7,059	+18.4

== See also ==
- 1956–57 Eerste Divisie
- 1956–57 Tweede Divisie
