= 1961–62 Eerste Divisie =

6th season of the second-tier football league in Netherlands

Eerste Divisie
- Season: 1961–62
- Champions: Heracles
- Promoted: HFC Haarlem; FC Hilversum; RKVV Wilhelmina
- Relegated: Half of each group
- From Eredivisie: Alkmaar '54; Elinkwijk; NOAD
- To Eredivisie: Heracles
- Goals scored: 2,029
- Average goals/game: 3.31

The Dutch Eerste Divisie for the 1961/1962 season was contested by 36 teams. It was the last time the Eerste Divisie was divided into two groups, as next season there would only be one division of sixteen teams: this meant that many teams were relegated to the Tweede Divisie. Heracles won the championship after a play-off against Fortuna Vlaardingen and were promoted to the Eredivisie.

== New entrants and group changes ==
=== Group A ===
Promoted from the 1960–61 Tweede Divisie:

- HFC Haarlem

Relegated from the 1960–61 Eredivisie:

- Alkmaar '54

Entered from the B-group:

- DHC
- FC Eindhoven
- Go Ahead
- 't Gooi
- VV Helmond
- Sittardia
- SVV

=== Group B ===
Promoted from the 1960–61 Tweede Divisie:

- FC Hilversum
- RKVV Wilhelmina

Relegated from the 1960–61 Eredivisie:

- Elinkwijk
- TSV NOAD

Entered from the A-group:

- Enschedese Boys
- Hermes DVS
- Hollandia Victoria Combinatie
- Limburgia
- RBC

== Final Tables ==
=== Group A ===
Pos	Team	Pld	W	D	L	GF	GA	GD	Pts	Qualification or relegation
1	Fortuna Vlaardingen	34	19	9	6	82	49	+33	47	Qualified for Promotion play-off.
2	DHC	34	17	12	5	54	22	+32	46	
3	Sittardia	34	18	9	7	58	36	+22	45	
4	Go Ahead	34	14	14	6	53	32	+21	42	
5	Veendam	34	15	11	8	60	38	+22	41	
6	FC Eindhoven	34	18	5	11	56	42	+14	41	
7	SVV	34	15	11	8	50	42	+8	41	Qualified for Relegation play-off.
8	AGOVV Apeldoorn	34	15	10	9	73	52	+21	40	Relegated to Tweede Divisie.
9	DFC	34	13	13	8	45	31	+14	39	Relegated to Tweede Divisie.
10	Vitesse Arnhem	34	14	8	12	62	62	0	36	Relegated to Tweede Divisie.
11	KFC	34	12	10	12	44	50	−6	34	Relegated to Tweede Divisie.
12	Alkmaar '54	34	13	7	14	50	50	0	33	Relegated to Tweede Divisie.
13	Leeuwarden	34	10	10	14	44	49	−5	30	Relegated to Tweede Divisie.
14	't Gooi	34	11	8	15	55	63	−8	30	Relegated to Tweede Divisie.
15	BVV	34	10	5	19	46	63	−17	25	Relegated to Tweede Divisie.
16	HFC Haarlem	34	5	5	24	28	81	−53	15	Relegated to Tweede Divisie.
17	Stormvogels	34	4	6	24	33	79	−46	14	Relegated to Tweede Divisie.
18	VV Helmond	34	6	1	27	30	82	−52	13	Returned to amateur football.

Source: rsssf.com

=== Group B ===
Pos	Team	Pld	W	D	L	GF	GA	GD	Pts	Qualification or relegation
1	Heracles	34	22	6	6	103	28	+75	50	Qualified for Promotion play-off.
2	SBV Excelsior	34	19	9	6	70	37	+33	47	
3	Elinkwijk	34	19	6	9	68	54	+14	44	
4	RBC Roosendaal	34	18	7	9	70	50	+20	43	
5	Enschedese Boys	34	18	6	10	84	51	+33	42	
6	Limburgia	34	17	7	10	72	48	+24	41	
7	SHS	34	17	6	11	57	37	+20	40	Qualified for Relegation play-off.
8	ZFC	34	14	8	12	40	36	+4	36	Relegated to Tweede Divisie.
9	Be Quick 1887	34	13	7	14	69	73	−4	33	Relegated to Tweede Divisie.
10	FC Wageningen	34	12	9	13	69	75	−6	33	Relegated to Tweede Divisie.
11	SC Heerenveen	34	10	11	13	46	52	−6	31	Relegated to Tweede Divisie.
12	Hermes DVS	34	12	7	15	52	62	−10	31	Relegated to Tweede Divisie.
13	TSV NOAD	34	12	7	15	55	71	−16	31	Relegated to Tweede Divisie.
14	FC Hilversum	34	12	5	17	58	58	0	29	Relegated to Tweede Divisie.
15	VSV	34	11	5	18	57	87	−30	27	Relegated to Tweede Divisie.
16	Hollandia Victoria Combinatie	34	11	4	19	55	71	−16	26	Relegated to Tweede Divisie.
17	RKVV Wilhelmina	34	8	7	19	51	84	−33	23	Relegated to Tweede Divisie.
18	EBOH	34	1	3	30	29	131	−102	5	Returned to amateur football.

Source: rsssf.com

== Play-offs ==
=== Promotion play-off ===
Team 1	Agg.	Team 2	1st leg	2nd leg
(Group B) Heracles	1–0	Fortuna Vlaardingen (Group A)	0–0	1–0

Heracles promoted to Eredivisie.

=== Relegation play-off ===
Team 1	Score	Team 2
(Group B) SHS	2–0	SVV (Group A)

SVV relegated to Tweede Divisie.

== See also ==
- 1961–62 Eredivisie
- 1961–62 Tweede Divisie
