= 1960–61 Eredivisie =

5th season of the Eredivisie

Eredivisie
- Season: 1960–61
- Champions: Feijenoord (6th title)
- Promoted: GVAV; Alkmaar '54; NOAD
- Relegated: USV Elinkwijk; Alkmaar '54; NOAD
- European Cup: Feijenoord
- Goals: 1,128
- Average goals/game: 3.68
- Top goalscorer: (Netherlands) Henk Groot - AFC Ajax; 41 goals
- Biggest home win: VVV '03 - NOAD: 8-1
- Biggest away win: Fortuna '54 - PSV: 0-5
- Highest scoring: Feijenoord - Ajax: 9-5

The Dutch Eredivisie in the 1960–61 season was contested by 18 teams. Feijenoord won the championship.

== League standings ==
Pos	Team	Pld	W	D	L	GF	GA	GD	Pts	Qualification or relegation
1	Feijenoord	34	24	5	5	100	40	+60	53	Qualified for 1961–62 European Cup.
2	Ajax	34	22	7	5	102	51	+51	51	Qualified for 1961–62 European Cup Winners' Cup.
3	VVV '03	34	18	6	10	77	47	+30	42	
4	Sparta	34	16	9	9	71	54	+17	41	
5	DOS	34	15	9	10	71	49	+22	39	
6	GVAV	34	15	8	11	57	51	+6	38	
7	PSV	34	14	9	11	74	59	+15	37	
8	DWS	34	11	13	10	59	49	+10	35	
9	NAC	34	15	4	15	59	64	−5	34	
10	Willem II	34	13	6	15	53	71	−18	32	
11	ADO	34	15	2	17	59	78	−19	32	
12	SC Enschede	34	12	6	16	52	63	−11	30	
13	Rapid JC	34	11	7	16	42	54	−12	29	
14	MVV	34	10	8	16	45	70	−25	28	
15	Fortuna '54	34	8	10	16	52	69	−17	26	
16	Elinkwijk	34	11	3	20	43	72	−29	25	Qualified for Relegation/Promotion play-off.
17	Alkmaar '54	34	6	12	16	39	61	−22	24	Relegated to Eerste Divisie.
18	NOAD	34	4	8	22	28	81	−53	16	Relegated to Eerste Divisie.

=== Relegation/Promotion play-off ===
Team 1	Agg.	Team 2	1st leg	2nd leg
(Eerste Divisie) De Volewijckers	8–7	Elinkwijk	4–3	4–4

Elinkwijk were relegated to the Eerste Divisie.

== Results ==
Home \ Away	ADO	AJX	ALK	DOS	DWS	ELI	ENS	FEY	FOR	GVA	MVV	NAC	NOA	PSV	RJC	SPA	VVV	WIL
ADO		1–3	1–1	4–1	0–2	2–1	3–2	0–2	3–2	0–2	2–1	2–3	3–1	2–1	2–1	5–2	0–2	1–0
AFC Ajax	4–2		3–1	3–1	2–2	6–1	1–1	0–1	7–4	5–2	4–0	4–1	3–0	0–0	1–0	1–1	2–0	6–0
Alkmaar '54	0–2	2–0		1–4	2–1	2–1	2–1	2–4	1–1	1–1	0–0	3–0	0–0	1–2	1–1	0–0	2–4	1–2
DOS	0–1	2–0	2–2		1–1	1–0	1–2	0–2	1–1	7–2	3–1	0–4	1–1	1–2	4–0	3–5	4–1	5–0
DWS	4–0	1–1	4–2	2–3		4–1	0–0	1–1	0–3	2–2	4–0	5–2	0–0	2–2	0–0	1–1	1–3	3–1
Elinkwijk	4–3	3–3	2–0	0–3	2–1		2–1	0–3	0–0	1–0	0–0	1–2	6–0	3–2	0–4	1–3	0–2	1–4
SC Enschede	2–5	2–5	2–2	3–2	2–2	2–0		0–2	3–0	0–1	1–0	6–2	3–0	2–4	0–2	2–5	0–1	3–2
Feijenoord	7–1	9–5	6–0	4–3	2–0	3–1	4–0		1–1	1–3	2–2	2–0	4–1	1–3	2–1	0–1	3–3	7–1
Fortuna '54	1–1	2–3	2–1	1–1	1–1	0–1	2–2	1–4		3–0	4–1	4–1	3–2	0–5	2–1	1–2	0–3	2–2
GVAV	0–2	1–1	1–0	1–1	2–4	1–0	1–2	1–0	3–1		1–0	2–1	3–0	2–0	4–0	2–2	5–2	1–1
MVV Maastricht	3–2	1–5	2–1	1–2	2–1	2–3	1–0	0–2	3–1	4–3		1–1	2–0	3–3	2–1	1–0	0–3	2–0
NAC	4–1	1–3	3–1	0–2	0–1	4–1	5–1	0–2	2–1	2–1	1–1		2–0	4–2	0–1	0–0	2–0	2–1
NOAD	3–5	1–4	0–0	1–1	1–3	0–1	1–1	1–5	0–3	0–2	3–2	2–3		2–1	1–2	0–2	1–5	0–2
PSV Eindhoven	4–1	1–3	2–1	1–2	3–2	1–0	3–1	4–2	4–1	1–1	5–0	2–2	1–1		1–1	5–4	1–1	1–2
Rapid JC	1–0	1–5	1–1	0–4	1–2	3–1	1–2	1–4	2–1	1–0	1–1	1–3	0–0	3–2		1–1	0–1	4–0
Sparta Rotterdam	5–2	1–4	2–2	0–0	3–1	1–3	0–2	1–2	5–1	4–3	3–2	3–1	0–2	4–2	3–1		2–0	3–0
VVV '03	5–0	2–0	1–3	0–3	2–0	5–1	1–0	2–2	0–0	0–1	6–2	6–1	8–1	1–1	2–4	1–1		1–2
Willem II	4–0	3–5	3–0	2–2	1–1	4–1	0–1	0–4	3–2	2–2	2–2	1–0	0–2	3–2	1–0	2–1	2–3	

Legend: Blue = home team win; Yellow = draw; Red = away team win.

== Attendances ==
#	Club	Average	Change
1	Feijenoord	40,912	+1.8
2	Ajax	16,588	−11.9
3	Sparta	15,941	−12.0
4	ADO	14,941	−11.7
5	PSV	13,294	−9.1
6	DWS	12,706	−30.3
7	GVAV	12,647	+12.3
8	DOS	12,029	−19.8
9	Alkmaar	11,471	+79.1
10	NAC	10,529	−9.4
11	Fortuna	9,618	−1.8
12	Enschede	9,559	−26.1
13	Willem II	8,912	−7.9
14	Elinkwijk	8,335	−24.2
15	MVV	8,318	−6.0
16	VVV	6,871	−13.5
17	Rapid	6,347	−14.0
18	NOAD	4,359	+65.5

== See also ==
- 1960–61 Eerste Divisie
- 1960–61 Tweede Divisie
