= 1961–62 Tweede Divisie =

Tweede Divisie
- Season: 1961–62
- Champions: Velox
- Promoted: Velox
- Relegated: UVS
- Goals: 672
- Average goals/game: 3.20

The Dutch Tweede Divisie in the 1961–1962 season was contested by 15 teams. This was the last season the teams would play in a single division. Due to a realignment in the Eerste Divisie, the Tweede Divisie would be expanded from one group to two, while the Eerste Divisie would become one league instead of two, meaning many teams would be relegated to this league next season.

Since it seemed necessary that some teams would have to be relegated to amateur football, play-offs for the 9th and 12th place were played. However, eventually only the last place finisher was actually relegated, as two teams from the Eerste Divisie moved straight to the amateurs.

== New entrants ==
Relegated from the Eerste Divisie

- HFC EDO
- Helmondia '55
- Racing Club Heemstede

== League standings ==
Pos	Team	Pld	W	D	L	GF	GA	GD	Pts	Promotion or relegation
1	Velox	28	16	4	8	71	39	+32	36	Promoted to Eerste Divisie
2	Roda Sport	28	13	8	7	53	34	+19	34	Merged with Rapid JC to form Roda JC (Note: Roda JC would compete in next season's Eerste Divisie.)
3	Helmondia '55	28	12	8	8	50	47	+3	32	
4	VV Baronie	28	12	7	9	54	47	+7	31	
5	HFC EDO	28	11	9	8	44	44	0	31	
6	Racing Club Heemstede	28	11	8	9	37	34	+3	30	
7	HVV Tubantia	28	12	6	10	52	49	+3	30	
8	VV Zwartemeer	28	11	5	12	34	41	−7	27	
9	NEC	28	10	6	12	57	58	−1	26	9th-11th Play-off
10	De Graafschap	28	10	6	12	33	39	−6	26	9th-11th Play-off
11	VV Oldenzaal	28	10	6	12	30	41	−11	26	9th-11th Play-off
12	Zwolsche Boys	28	9	6	13	43	43	0	24	12th-13th Play-off
13	LONGA	28	7	10	11	38	47	−9	24	12th-13th Play-off
14	PEC	28	9	5	14	45	64	−19	23	
15	UVS	28	7	6	15	31	45	−14	20	Relegated to amateur football

Source: rsssf.com
Notes:

9th-11th Play-offs
Team 1	Score	Team 2
VV Oldenzaal	3 - 1	De Graafschap
NEC	1 - 0	VV Oldenzaal
De Graafschap	2 - 0	NEC

However, no one was relegated as a result of this.

12th-13th Play-off
Team 1	Score	Team 2
LONGA	4 - 1	Zwolsche Boys

However, Zwolsche Boys were not relegated as a result of this.

== See also ==
- 1961–62 Eredivisie
- 1961–62 Eerste Divisie
