= 1959–60 Eredivisie =

4th season of the Eredivisie

Eredivisie
- Season: 1959–60
- Champions: AFC Ajax (10th title)
- Promoted: FC Volendam; Sittardia
- Relegated: Blauw-Wit Amsterdam; FC Volendam; Sittardia
- European Cup: AFC Ajax
- Goals: 1,132
- Average goals/game: 3.69
- Top goalscorer: (Netherlands) Henk Groot - AFC Ajax; 38 goals
- Biggest home win: Ajax - FC Volendam: 9-0
- Biggest away win: Sittardia - SC Enschede: 1-10
- Highest scoring: Sittardia - SC Enschede: 1-10

The Dutch Eredivisie in the 1959–60 season was contested by 18 teams. AFC Ajax won the championship, after a decision match against Feijenoord which was won by 5–1.

== League standings ==
Pos	Team	Pld	W	D	L	GF	GA	GD	Pts	Qualification or relegation
1	Ajax	34	22	6	6	109	44	+65	50	Championship play-off as level on points
2	Feijenoord	34	20	10	4	94	32	+62	50	Championship play-off as level on points
3	PSV	34	18	9	7	72	48	+24	45	
4	DOS	34	18	4	12	75	57	+18	40	
5	NAC	34	15	9	10	56	53	+3	39	
6	VVV '03	34	12	12	10	57	60	−3	36	
7	Sparta	34	14	6	14	53	52	+1	34	
8	Willem II	34	11	11	12	65	69	−4	33	
9	SC Enschede	34	14	4	16	81	76	+5	32	
10	DWS	34	13	6	15	51	59	−8	32	
11	Rapid JC	34	10	12	12	46	55	−9	32	
12	ADO	34	13	5	16	62	68	−6	31	
13	MVV	34	13	5	16	60	69	−9	31	
14	Fortuna '54	34	11	8	15	67	81	−14	30	
15	Elinkwijk	34	9	11	14	37	48	−11	29	Relegation play-off as level on points
16	Blauw-Wit	34	12	5	17	53	82	−29	29	Relegation play-off as level on points
17	FC Volendam	34	10	3	21	54	88	−34	23	Relegated to Eerste Divisie
18	Sittardia	34	5	6	23	40	91	−51	16	Relegated to Eerste Divisie

== Championship play-off ==
Team 1	Score	Team 2
AFC Ajax	5–1	Feijenoord

AFC Ajax qualified for the 1960–61 European Cup.

== Relegation play-off ==
Team 1	Score	Team 2
Elinkwijk	1–0	Blauw-Wit Amsterdam

Blauw-Wit Amsterdam are relegated to Eerste Divisie.

Note: No edition of the KNVB Cup was held this year.

== Results ==
Home \ Away	ADO	AJX	BLW	DOS	DWS	ELI	ENS	FEY	FOR	MVV	NAC	PSV	RJC	SIT	SPA	VOL	VVV	WIL
ADO Den Haag		2–1	4–1	2–1	1–2	1–2	2–2	1–0	1–1	3–2	4–1	1–2	5–1	1–2	2–0	4–1	1–4	3–3
AFC Ajax	3–0		8–1	2–1	2–0	1–1	3–0	4–1	5–1	0–1	3–0	6–2	3–2	4–2	5–0	9–0	5–2	2–2
Blauw Wit Ams'dam	2–1	1–0		0–5	0–2	0–0	3–2	2–7	1–4	0–2	4–3	1–1	3–1	5–2	2–1	2–3	2–0	0–1
DOS	3–1	2–2	3–2		4–2	3–2	3–3	0–1	8–0	7–2	1–2	2–1	1–2	1–0	1–0	2–0	1–2	2–1
DWS	2–4	1–0	2–0	0–4		0–1	2–4	1–1	2–1	0–0	1–2	2–5	1–2	2–3	2–2	4–2	1–0	4–0
Elinkwijk	1–3	2–4	1–3	0–0	0–2		3–1	0–0	2–4	2–0	0–0	0–2	0–0	1–0	1–1	3–2	0–0	2–0
SC Enschede	4–1	3–3	6–3	5–0	1–3	2–0		0–4	5–2	2–2	1–2	4–1	3–1	0–2	3–1	3–2	3–2	4–2
Feijenoord	5–2	3–0	2–0	4–1	6–2	2–1	4–1		7–1	6–1	1–1	1–1	5–0	4–2	0–1	6–1	2–2	0–0
Fortuna '54	1–1	2–7	5–2	1–1	2–1	0–2	4–2	1–3		1–2	1–1	0–2	2–2	1–1	2–3	4–2	4–1	2–2
MVV Maastricht	1–1	3–6	4–2	2–3	2–1	2–0	4–0	2–0	0–6		0–2	0–0	3–0	3–0	3–0	5–3	1–2	2–3
NAC	3–2	2–1	1–2	1–4	2–2	1–1	2–1	0–0	1–5	3–1		1–3	1–1	5–1	3–0	3–1	4–1	3–1
PSV Eindhoven	0–3	1–1	6–1	4–0	1–1	3–1	5–0	0–2	3–1	2–1	2–0		3–3	4–1	1–2	3–2	4–1	2–2
Rapid JC	1–0	2–2	0–1	0–2	0–1	3–3	0–1	1–1	2–0	2–1	0–0	3–0		3–1	2–0	2–2	2–1	2–2
Sittardia	3–2	1–4	1–1	2–5	0–2	2–1	1–10	1–5	0–3	2–2	0–1	0–1	1–1		0–1	1–5	1–1	1–1
Sparta Rotterdam	6–0	0–4	0–2	0–1	0–0	0–1	2–1	0–5	4–0	2–1	3–0	0–0	0–1	4–2		3–2	6–0	2–0
FC Volendam	0–2	0–3	2–1	4–0	3–1	1–0	2–1	1–1	0–4	1–3	1–0	1–2	2–1	2–1	0–4		1–2	2–2
VVV '03	3–1	1–2	0–0	3–2	3–0	2–2	3–2	1–1	0–0	4–1	1–1	1–1	1–1	3–2	2–2	4–2		2–2
Willem II	3–0	2–4	2–2	4–1	1–2	3–1	2–1	0–4	5–1	3–1	3–4	3–4	3–2	2–1	3–3	2–1	0–2	

Legend: Blue = home team win; Yellow = draw; Red = away team win.

== Attendances ==
#	Club	Average	Change
1	Feijenoord	40,176	+3.7%
2	Ajax	18,824	+41.9%
3	Blauw-Wit	18,676	+6.0%
4	DWS	18,235	-13.4%
5	Sparta	18,118	-9.3%
6	ADO	16,929	+4.3%
7	DOS	15,000	+13.8%
8	PSV	14,618	+12.2%
9	Enschede	12,941	+11.1%
10	NAC	11,618	+13.2%
11	Volendam	11,412	+96.8%
12	Elinkwijk	10,994	+12.3%
13	Fortuna	9,794	-7.5%
14	Willem II	9,676	+6.8%
15	MVV	8,853	+17.6%
16	VVV	7,941	+17.9%
17	Rapid	7,382	-17.2%
18	Sittardia	6,941	+86.2%

== See also ==
- 1959–60 Eerste Divisie
- 1959–60 Tweede Divisie
