= 1957–58 Eredivisie =

2nd season of the Eredivisie

Eredivisie
- Season: 1957–58
- Champions: DOS (1st title)
- Promoted: ADO Den Haag; Blauw-Wit Amsterdam
- Relegated: GVAV; BVV
- European Cup: DOS
- Matches: 306
- Goals: 1,135 (3.71 per match)
- Top goalscorer: (Netherlands) Leo Canjels - NAC; 32 goals
- Biggest home win: MVV 9–0 BVV
- Biggest away win: SC Enschede 0–7 Fortuna '54
- Highest scoring: Fortuna '54 5–5 NAC

The Dutch Eredivisie in the 1957–58 season was contested by 18 teams. At the end of the competition, Door Oefening Sterk (DOS) and SC Enschede shared the lead with 47 points. According to the rules, an extra match was required. It was played at a neutral field (De Goffert, Nijmegen) and Door Oefening Sterk won the championship by winning 1-0 after extra time.

Another play-off was held to determine which team had to relegate. Elinkwijk played GVAV at neutral terrain and won 2–1. Therefore, GVAV relegated.

== League standings ==
Pos	Team	Pld	W	D	L	GF	GA	GD	Pts	Qualification or relegation
1	DOS	34	19	9	6	84	52	+32	47	Championship play-off required as level on points
2	SC Enschede	34	19	9	6	75	48	+27	47	Championship play-off required as level on points
3	AFC Ajax	34	17	8	9	62	44	+18	42	
4	Fortuna '54	34	16	8	10	72	53	+19	40	
5	MVV	34	15	7	12	57	50	+7	37	
6	ADO Den Haag	34	14	7	13	68	56	+12	35	
7	VVV '03	34	14	7	13	61	59	+2	35	
8	NAC	34	15	5	14	69	70	−1	35	
9	Sparta Rotterdam	34	11	12	11	63	62	+1	34	Winners of the 1957–58 KNVB Cup
10	PSV Eindhoven	34	13	6	15	73	70	+3	32	
11	Feijenoord	34	13	6	15	74	76	−2	32	
12	Rapid JC	34	13	5	16	56	67	−11	31	
13	Blauw-Wit Amsterdam	34	11	8	15	56	59	−3	30	
14	BVC Amsterdam	34	9	12	13	54	63	−9	30	Played as DWS next season after a merger
15	TSV NOAD	34	11	7	16	50	76	−26	29	
16	GVAV	34	10	8	16	58	63	−5	28	Relegation play-off required as level on points
17	Elinkwijk	34	10	8	16	47	71	−24	28	Relegation play-off required as level on points
18	BVV	34	7	6	21	56	96	−40	20	Relegated to Eerste Divisie

== Championship play-off ==
Team 1	Score	Team 2
DOS	1–0 (a.e.t.)	SC Enschede

DOS won the championship, and qualified for 1958–59 European Cup.

== Relegation play-off ==
Team 1	Score	Team 2
Elinkwijk	2–1	GVAV

GVAV were relegated to Eerste Divisie.

== Results ==
Home \ Away	ADO	AJX	AMS	BLW	BVV	DOS	ELI	FEY	FOR	GVA	MVV	NAC	NOA	PSV	RJC	ENS	SPA	VVV
ADO Den Haag		3–1	3–3	1–0	0–1	6–2	1–0	6–3	1–2	1–1	0–1	5–0	0–4	2–0	2–1	2–4	3–3	1–0
AFC Ajax	1–1		3–4	1–0	3–1	1–0	1–1	1–2	2–0	3–2	4–0	3–1	1–0	1–2	1–1	0–0	2–2	2–1
BVC Amsterdam	2–1	0–2		1–3	3–1	0–0	0–1	1–1	4–1	0–0	3–2	3–2	1–1	0–2	2–3	2–2	2–2	6–1
Blauw-Wit Ams'dam	3–2	2–1	1–1		1–2	2–2	1–1	1–4	3–3	2–3	1–3	1–1	1–2	6–3	1–0	1–0	0–0	4–1
BVV	2–4	0–1	3–3	1–2		2–4	1–0	1–3	0–2	2–2	2–3	1–2	0–2	1–5	2–2	1–1	6–4	3–3
DOS	4–2	5–1	3–1	0–0	2–1		4–1	6–2	1–0	4–2	2–1	5–2	1–1	2–2	3–2	0–2	2–1	6–1
Elinkwijk	1–4	0–3	2–1	0–5	0–4	2–3		1–0	1–1	2–3	3–3	2–1	1–2	3–3	2–1	1–0	3–1	2–2
Feijenoord	0–1	2–3	3–1	3–1	2–4	4–4	5–2		1–1	2–1	3–1	3–1	4–0	3–2	5–1	1–1	1–2	1–3
Fortuna '54	2–1	1–1	3–1	6–2	3–2	1–0	2–2	2–1		1–2	0–1	5–5	1–2	1–0	3–0	0–2	1–3	2–2
GVAV	3–2	0–1	2–1	1–0	1–2	1–2	0–0	1–3	1–7		0–0	1–3	5–0	7–1	2–3	2–2	4–0	1–3
MVV	1–0	3–0	1–1	3–1	9–0	0–4	6–2	0–4	1–2	1–1		2–1	3–1	0–1	1–1	2–1	1–1	0–1
NAC	0–0	2–1	1–1	2–5	4–2	4–0	1–2	3–1	4–3	4–1	0–1		4–0	1–6	0–3	1–2	4–1	4–1
NOAD	2–3	1–3	0–2	1–0	3–3	3–3	1–2	1–1	1–0	3–1	2–3	2–4		3–1	2–0	2–6	0–3	2–1
PSV Eindhoven	1–1	0–5	6–1	2–3	5–3	2–3	1–0	6–0	2–3	1–0	2–0	0–1	2–2		4–2	1–1	1–1	3–0
Rapid JC	0–4	2–1	1–2	3–1	4–1	1–0	2–1	3–2	2–3	1–0	2–2	1–2	3–1	3–1		3–4	1–1	2–1
SC Enschede	4–3	0–3	0–0	3–2	4–0	0–0	5–2	4–2	0–7	3–2	2–0	3–0	3–0	5–4	4–0		2–0	3–0
Sparta Rotterdam	2–2	4–4	5–1	0–0	3–1	1–7	0–2	4–2	2–2	1–0	2–1	0–1	8–1	2–0	2–1	1–1		1–2
VVV '03	2–0	1–1	1–0	2–0	6–0	0–0	3–2	4–0	0–1	2–3	0–1	3–3	2–2	4–1	4–1	3–1	1–0	

Legend: Blue = home team win; Yellow = draw; Red = away team win.

== Attendances ==
No.	Club	Average	Change	Highest
1	Feijenoord	39,765	-6,6%	63,500
2	BVC Amsterdam	18,188	-0,7%	42,000
3	FC Blauw-Wit Amsterdam	18,029	95,0%	42,000
4	ADO Den Haag	17,676	51,1%	20,500
5	VV DOS	17,294	42,4%	24,000
6	Sparta Rotterdam	15,647	-2,6%	25,500
7	AFC Ajax	15,353	-14,7%	23,000
8	PSV	14,971	21,8%	19,000
9	SC Enschede	13,165	-16,5%	26,000
10	FC Groningen	12,324	5,4%	16,500
11	Fortuna '54	10,971	-19,3%	25,000
12	BVV	10,971	9,6%	30,000
13	USV Elinkwijk	10,971	19,6%	15,000
14	NAC	9,765	-2,6%	14,000
15	MVV Maastricht	8,971	-5,6%	16,000
16	TSV NOAD	8,235	16,7%	25,000
17	VVV '03	7,935	12,0%	15,000
18	Rapid JC	6,576	-15,4%	20,000

== See also ==
- 1957–58 Eerste Divisie
- 1957–58 Tweede Divisie
