= 1958–59 Eredivisie =

3rd season of the Eredivisie

Eredivisie
- Season: 1958–59
- Champions: Sparta Rotterdam (6th title)
- Promoted: Willem II; SHS
- Relegated: TSV NOAD; SHS
- European Cup: Sparta Rotterdam
- Goals: 1,188
- Average goals/game: 3.88
- Top goalscorer: (Netherlands) Leo Canjels - NAC 34 goals
- Biggest home win: DOS - SHS: 10-0
- Biggest away win: Fortuna '54 - Feijenoord: 0-8
- Highest scoring: SHS - Ajax: 2-9

The Dutch Eredivisie in the 1958–59 season was contested by 18 teams. Sparta won the championship.

== League standings ==
Pos	Team	Pld	W	D	L	GF	GA	GD	Pts	Qualification or relegation
1	Sparta	34	20	11	3	83	30	+53	51	Qualified for 1959–60 European Cup
2	Rapid JC	34	20	8	6	64	34	+30	48	
3	Fortuna '54	34	17	10	7	56	47	+9	44	
4	DOS	34	17	9	8	86	46	+40	43	
5	Feijenoord	34	17	7	10	84	54	+30	41	
6	Ajax	34	15	7	12	77	63	+14	37	
7	SC Enschede	34	15	7	12	67	59	+8	37	
8	MVV	34	12	13	9	64	59	+5	37	
9	VVV '03	34	13	10	11	71	65	+6	36	Winners of the 1958–59 KNVB Cup
10	PSV	34	12	9	13	61	60	+1	33	
11	NAC	34	13	6	15	72	72	0	32	
12	Elinkwijk	34	11	8	15	55	57	−2	30	
13	ADO	34	9	10	15	63	84	−21	28	
14	Blauw-Wit	34	9	8	17	62	79	−17	26	
15	DWS	34	8	10	16	54	80	−26	26	
16	Willem II	34	10	5	19	60	98	−38	25	
17	NOAD	34	6	8	20	55	90	−35	20	Relegated to Eerste Divisie
18	SHS	34	7	4	23	54	111	−57	18	Relegated to Eerste Divisie

== Results ==
Home \ Away	ADO	AJX	BLW	DOS	DWS	ELI	FEY	FOR	MVV	NAC	NOA	PSV	RJC	ENS	SHS	SPA	VVV	WIL
ADO Den Haag		3–4	1–2	1–1	4–4	2–1	2–1	2–4	0–1	3–1	5–1	2–2	2–2	2–0	3–2	1–6	5–1	7–3
AFC Ajax	3–3		4–2	2–0	0–1	1–4	3–1	2–0	0–2	5–2	2–0	1–0	0–2	2–2	1–2	1–1	3–0	3–1
Blauw Wit Ams'dam	1–1	1–0		1–1	1–3	0–0	2–2	1–0	0–0	4–2	5–1	0–2	1–2	0–3	2–3	1–1	5–2	6–2
DOS	5–0	5–3	7–3		9–0	2–1	0–1	0–0	6–1	3–2	2–2	2–2	2–1	2–3	10–0	0–3	1–1	2–0
DWS	2–1	1–2	2–2	0–1		0–2	0–5	0–2	1–1	3–5	2–1	2–2	2–0	6–3	2–1	0–4	0–0	4–1
Elinkwijk	3–1	2–2	3–0	0–4	3–3		3–6	0–1	1–1	1–3	4–0	3–0	1–3	4–0	2–0	0–0	1–1	4–2
Feijenoord	4–0	0–5	5–1	4–1	0–0	1–0		6–0	3–1	2–2	3–1	1–1	2–0	4–2	4–1	0–3	2–0	6–1
Fortuna '54	3–1	3–1	2–2	1–2	2–1	3–2	0–8		0–0	2–1	3–1	1–1	0–1	2–0	4–1	3–1	3–1	5–4
MVV	7–1	1–4	4–2	1–3	4–2	1–3	1–1	2–2		3–0	4–2	1–1	2–2	2–0	2–2	2–0	6–2	2–4
NAC	2–1	2–4	3–0	1–2	1–1	1–1	3–0	0–1	2–3		4–2	3–2	0–3	0–3	5–0	0–3	2–2	4–0
TSV NOAD	1–1	2–2	1–4	2–0	2–2	1–0	2–1	0–0	1–1	3–3		1–3	0–1	2–6	4–3	0–4	2–3	1–2
PSV Eindhoven	1–2	1–1	5–4	1–3	4–1	2–0	3–1	1–2	0–0	1–3	4–3		1–1	0–1	4–2	4–2	0–1	3–0
Rapid JC	6–0	4–1	3–1	2–0	1–0	2–1	3–3	0–0	3–1	2–3	5–3	2–1		3–1	2–1	0–0	2–1	4–0
SC Enschede	2–1	1–1	2–1	1–0	3–2	2–2	4–0	1–1	0–2	6–2	0–0	6–3	1–0		5–0	0–2	2–0	1–1
SHS	2–2	2–9	1–3	3–3	3–2	0–1	1–2	2–0	4–1	2–2	1–7	2–3	0–1	3–2		1–5	1–2	6–1
Sparta Rotterdam	4–1	4–2	2–1	1–1	2–2	3–0	2–2	1–1	3–0	1–0	4–0	4–1	0–0	3–1	6–1		2–1	3–0
VVV '03	1–1	3–2	6–2	0–0	6–2	4–1	4–2	1–1	1–1	2–3	5–4	1–2	1–1	3–0	4–1	3–3		5–2
Willem II	1–1	5–1	3–1	2–6	2–1	5–1	2–1	0–4	3–3	1–5	1–2	1–0	2–0	3–3	5–0	0–0	0–3	

Legend: Blue = home team win; Yellow = draw; Red = away team win.

== Attendances ==
#	Club	Average	Change
1	Feijenoord	38,753	−2.5
2	DWS	21,059	+15.8
3	Sparta	19,971	+27.6
4	Blauw-Wit	17,618	−2.3
5	SHS	16,353	+3.6
6	ADO	16,235	−8.2
7	Ajax	13,265	−13.6
8	DOS	13,176	−23.8
9	PSV	13,029	−13.0
10	Enschede	11,647	−11.5
11	Fortuna	10,588	−3.5
12	NAC	10,259	+5.1
13	Elinkwijk	9,794	−10.7
14	Willem II	9,059	+22.4
15	Rapid	8,912	+35.5
16	MVV	7,529	−16.1
17	VVV	6,735	−15.1
18	NOAD	6,471	−21.4

== See also ==
- 1958–59 Eerste Divisie
- 1958–59 Tweede Divisie
