= VV De Valk =

Dutch football club

De Valk
- Full name: Voetbalvereniging De Valk
- Founded: 30 April 1909
- Ground: Het Valkennest, Valkenswaard
- Chairman: Corné Maas
- Manager: Nik Bierens
- League: Tweede klasse Sunday (2020–21)
- Website: http://www.vvdevalk.nl/
Home colours

Voetbalvereniging De Valk is an association football club from Valkenswaard, Netherlands. De Valk plays in the 2017-18 Sunday Eerste Klasse (5th tier).

== History ==
The club was founded on the day princess Juliana was born. The name of the club was Juliana. The name was changed to De Valk in 1912.

De Valk played professional football from 1955 until 1961. The club played its first year in the newly established Eerste Klasse, which name was later changed to Eerste Divisie. De Valk finished ninth in their first season of professional football and were relegated to the newly established Tweede Divisie. De Valk finished in last place in the 1960–61 Tweede Divisie and returned to amateur football. In 1963, De Valk became Dutch champion in Sunday amateur football.

In the 2012–13 season it won a championship of the Eerste Klasse and promoted to the Hoofdklasse.
