= Enschedese Boys =

Dutch football club

- Full name: s.v. De Enschedese Boys
- Nickname: De Boys
- Founded: 20 April 1906; 120 years ago
- Ground: Sportpark Wesselerbrink Zuid; Enschede
- Capacity: 2,000
- Chairman: Gerrit van der Zande
- Manager: Toon Jerusalem
- League: Vierde Klasse
Home colours	Away colours

Enschedese Boys is an amateur football club from the Dutch city Enschede. In 1965 the professional team of De Boys merged with their rivals Sportclub Enschede to FC Twente (both clubs continued in non-league football). Currently Enschedese Boys plays in the Vierde Klasse (8th tier in Dutch football).

== History ==
Enschedese Boys was founded on 20 April 1906 by a couple of teenagers under the name Lotisco. When the club joined the Twentsche Voetbalbond (FA of Twente) a year later, the name was changed to Excelsior. In 1910 the club would get its current name.

Enschedese Boys soon became the most popular team under the working class of Enschede. The rivalry with SC Enschede (supported by the middle class and the owners of the factories) became one of the fiercest in the country. It is said that supporters of De Boys refused to wear black shoe strings, since black is the colour of Sportclub. Supporters of Sportclub never cooked the green soupe erwtensoep for the same reason. Until 1954 Dutch football was organized regionally (regional champions would play each other at the end of the season for the national championship), so the Enschede Derby was played every season. In season 1949/50 De Boys finally won the championship of the east, so they could play the other regional champions. However, in a poule with AFC Ajax, Blauw-Wit Amsterdam, sc Heerenveen, SV Limburgia and Maurits they ended last. The home game against Ajax resulted in a record attendance of over 25,000 spectators in the small Volksparkstadion.

When in 1954 professional football was introduced in the Netherlands and the regional system disappeared, Enschedese Boys had to start in the Tweede Divisie (3rd tier), while local rivals Sportclub and vv Rigtersbleek could start respectively in the Eredivisie (highest) and Eerste Divisie (2nd tier). In spite of popular players like Darius Dhlomo (a South African activist for the ANC and one of the first black players in the Netherlands) and Dutch superstar Abe Lenstra (bought from Sportclub in 1960) De Boys could not equal their successes of the amateur times. In season 1960/61, with captain Abe Lenstra, they did force a promotion to the Eerste Divisie. However, they never reached higher than the fourth place there. Since both De Boys and Sportclub had financial problems and the city Enschede only wanted to help one team, both clubs merged in 1965 to form FC Twente '65. Both clubs did continue in the Derde Klasse (amateur football).

Initially the move to non-league football went well for De Boys. Within nine years the highest amateur league (the Hoofdklasse) was reached. In season 1974/75 the club moved to their current ground Sportpark Wesselerbrink Zuid in the new south district of the city. In the early 1990s decline started, resulting in a current stay in the Vierde Klasse (8th tier).

There are plans for the near future to merge De Boys with neighbours UDI Enschede. However, no official statement has been given so far on this topic.

== Honours ==
- Champion East Netherlands (1)

1949/50
