= Sportclub Enschede =

Dutch football club

SC Enschede
- Full name: Sportclub Enschede
- Nickname(s): Sportclub
- Founded: 1 June 1910; 114 years ago
- Ground: Sportcampus Diekman; Enschede
- Capacity: 5,000
- Chairman: Albert Walda
- Manager: René Belt
- League: Vierde Klasse
Home colours	Away colours

Sportclub Enschede is a football club from Enschede, Netherlands. SC Enschede was established in 1910. The club won the national championship in 1926. In 1965 SC Enschede merged with their rivals Enschedese Boys to form FC Twente (both clubs continued as non-league clubs). Currently Sportclub plays in the Vierde Klasse (9th tier in Dutch football).

== History ==
Sportclub Enschede was founded on 1 June 1910. Soon the club developed in one of the leading football clubs in the Netherlands, winning the national title in 1926 and winning the Eastern League five times. From 1935 to 1937 the club was managed by Béla Guttmann.

When in 1956 the new Eredivisie was established (as the single highest league in the Netherlands), SC Enschede was one of the top teams with star players as Abe Lenstra and Helmut Rahn. In 1958 they lost after 180 (!) minutes the first and last final of the Eredivisie ever against DOS Utrecht. In 1965 they were forced due to debts to merge with their rivals Enschedese Boys to FC Twente. SC Enschede continued as non-league amateur club. Currently, they play in the Vierde Klasse (the ninth tier of Dutch football).

== Honours ==
- Dutch National Title:

Winner (1): 1925–26
Runner-up (1): 1957–58
