= VV Rigtersbleek =

Dutch football club

- Full name: Voetbal Vereniging Rigtersbleek
- Founded: 10 August 1910
- Ground: Sportpark Rigtersbleek, Enschede
- League: Eerste Klasse Sunday E (2019–20)
- Website: http://www.rigtersbleek.nl/
Home colours

VV Rigtersbleek is a football club from Enschede, Netherlands. It plays in the 2017–18 Sunday Eerste Klasse E.

== History ==
From 1954 to 1961 Rigtersbleek played professional football. In 1954/55 in the Eerste Klasse and in 1955/56 in the Hoofdklasse, both comparable to today's Eredivisie. After that 4 seasons in the Eerste Divisie Rigtersbleek ended its professional years in 1960–61 in the Tweede Divisie.

Due to the financial burden of professional football Rigtersbleek decided, as of season 1961/62, voluntary to rejoin the amateur ranks. For most of the time it played in the Derde Klasse. In the recent years it bounced up and down between the Hoofdklasse and Eerste Klasse.
