= ASC De Volewijckers =

Association football club in Amsterdam, Netherlands

- Full name: Amsterdamsche Sport Club De Volewijckers
- Founded: 1 May 1912; 113 years ago, as ASV-DWV
- Ground: Sportpark Buiksloterbanne, Amsterdam
- Capacity: 2,000
- Chairman: Thomas Bayer (interim)
- Manager: Henk Fryde
- League: Vierde Klasse
- 2022–23: Saturday Derde Klasse A, 10th of 13 (relegated)
- Website: www.ascdevolewijckers.nl
colours

ASC De Volewijckers is a Dutch football club that plays in the Vierde Klasse. It is a continuation of ASV–DWV and AVV De Volewijckers.

== History ==
=== ASV–DWV ===
ASV-DWV or Door Wilskracht Verkregen was founded on 12 May 1912 in present-day Amsterdam-Noord. Its home ground was Sportpark Elzenhagen.

ASV-DWV was promoted to first class, the highest amateur football level in the 1913–14 season. As a result of a flood disaster in 1916, the entire accommodation was destroyed. In 1921 the club started again but now in the third class of the Dutch soccer association (KNVB). In the years 1935, '36 and '37 the club promoted from the third class and second class to the first class again. In the 1947-48 season, the club made it to the finals of the 'KNVB' cup but lost after penalties to FC Wageningen.

It won the Arol Cup in the season 1959–60.

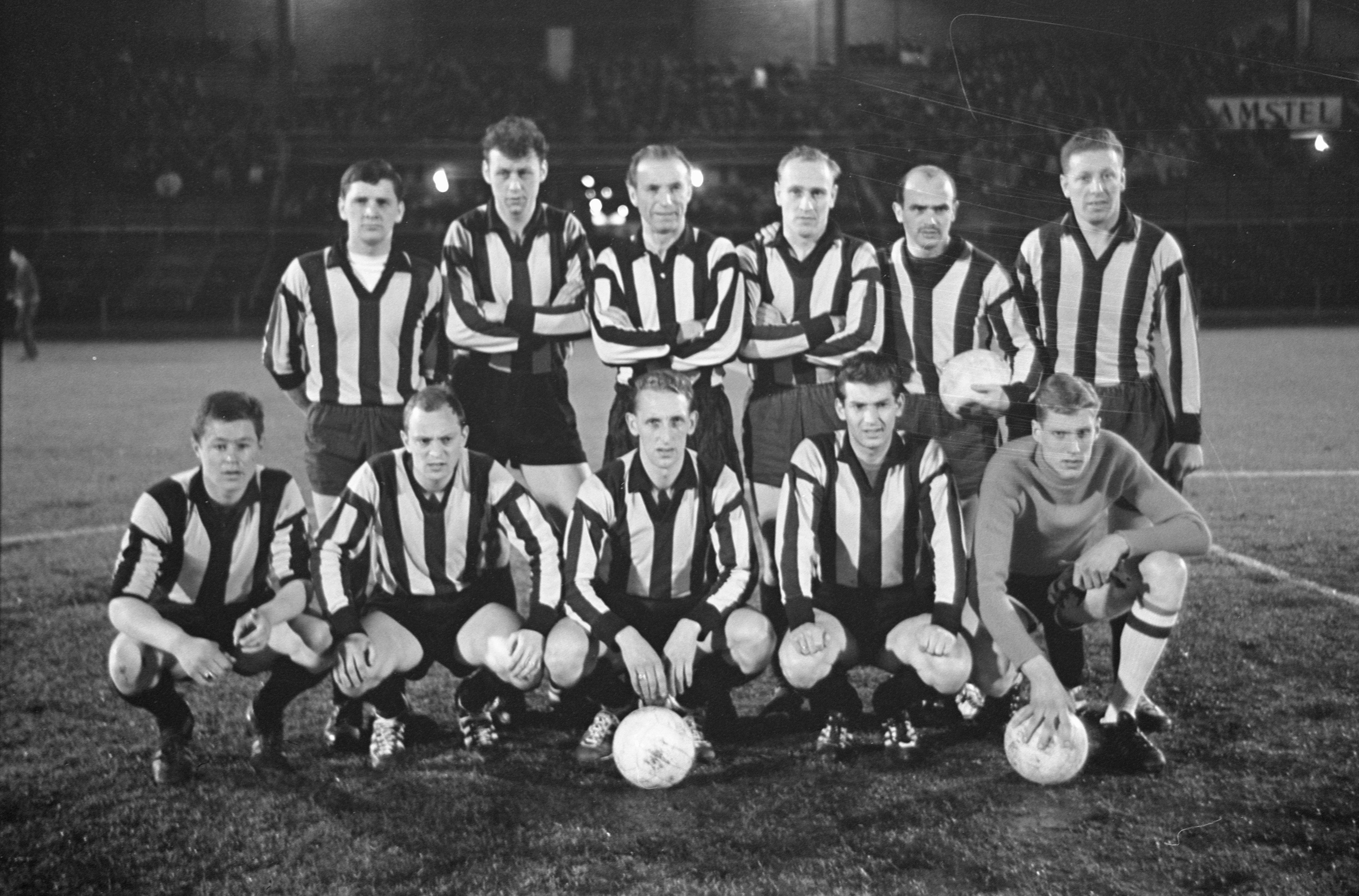
D.W.V. with Stanley Matthews (3rd from left) before the match against De Volewijckers (4 April 1962)

In the 1954 season 1954 the club chose to remain as an amateur team. It also decided to expand to include additional sports including basketball and volleyball. It decided not to merge with De Volewijckers.

In 1975–76 DWV was promoted from second class to the main class. Two seasons later, the season 1977–78, therefore they were able to participate in the KNVB Amateur Cup.

==== KNVB Amateur Cup ====
- Winner in 1978, 1990

==== District Cup West I ====
Winner in 1978, 1990

=== AVV De Volewijckers ===
AVV de Volewijckers
- Full name: Amsterdamsche Voetbal Vereniging; De Volewijckers
- Founded: November 1, 1920
- Dissolved: 2013
- Ground: Amsterdam-Noord; Amsterdam
Home colours

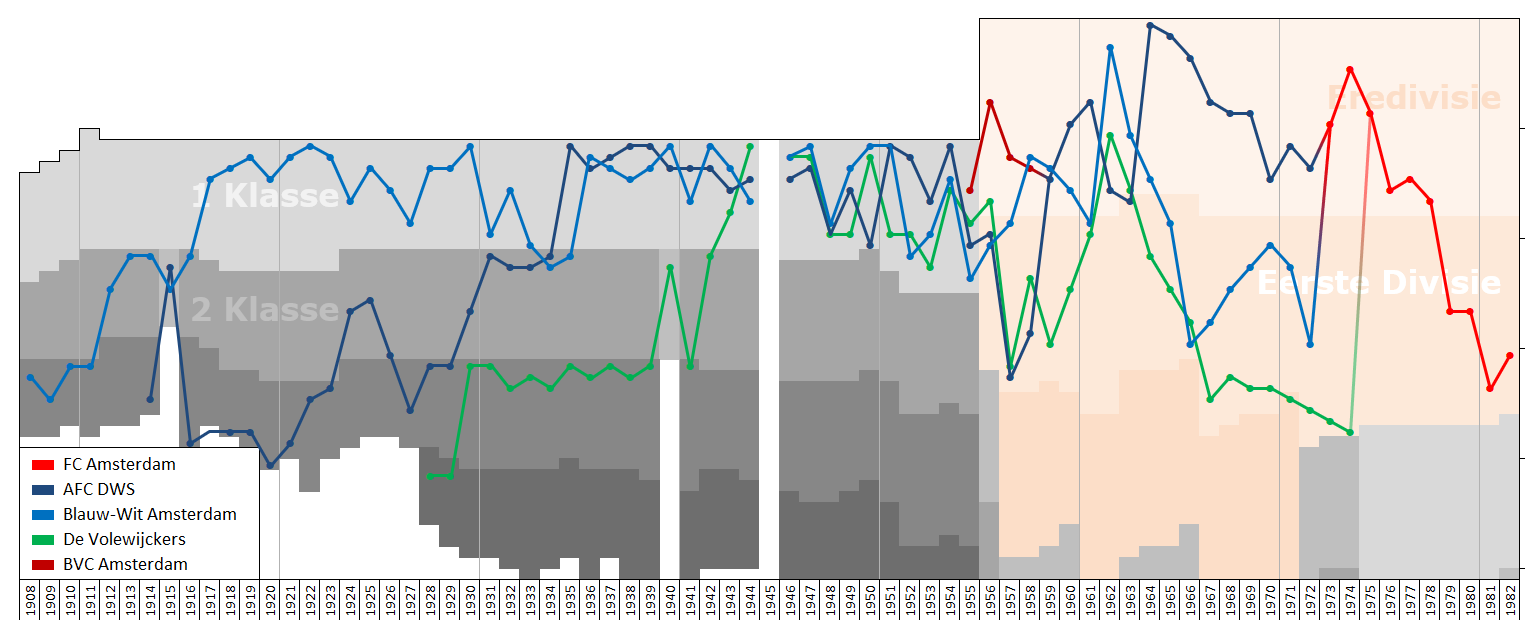
Historical chart of FC Amsterdam league performance (De Volewijkers shown in green)

De Volewijckers was one of a number of Dutch football clubs that were successful in post-war leagues before being forced to merge to cope with the popularity of bigger teams such as Ajax and Feyenoord. In 1942, they were promoted to the top tier of Dutch football to become the biggest club in Amsterdam. They played their home games at Mosveld in Amsterdam-Noord but moved to Ajax' Stadion de Meer during the Second World War after Mosveld was bombed. In 1944, they were crowned Dutch league champions. Formerly amateur, they became a professional club in 1954 and played in the Eredivisie from 1961 through 1963. They were forced to leave Mosveld in 1964 and were moved to a new complex in Buiksloterbanne.

In 1974, the club merged with Blauw Wit and DWS to form FC Amsterdam. De Volewijckers continued as an amateur club.

=== DVC Buiksloot ===
AVV De Volewijckers merged with DWV to form DVC Buiksloot in summer 2013. The merged club adopted the name ASC De Volewijckers in 2019.

== Honours ==
- Dutch football champion: 1943–44
