= HFC EDO =

Dutch football club

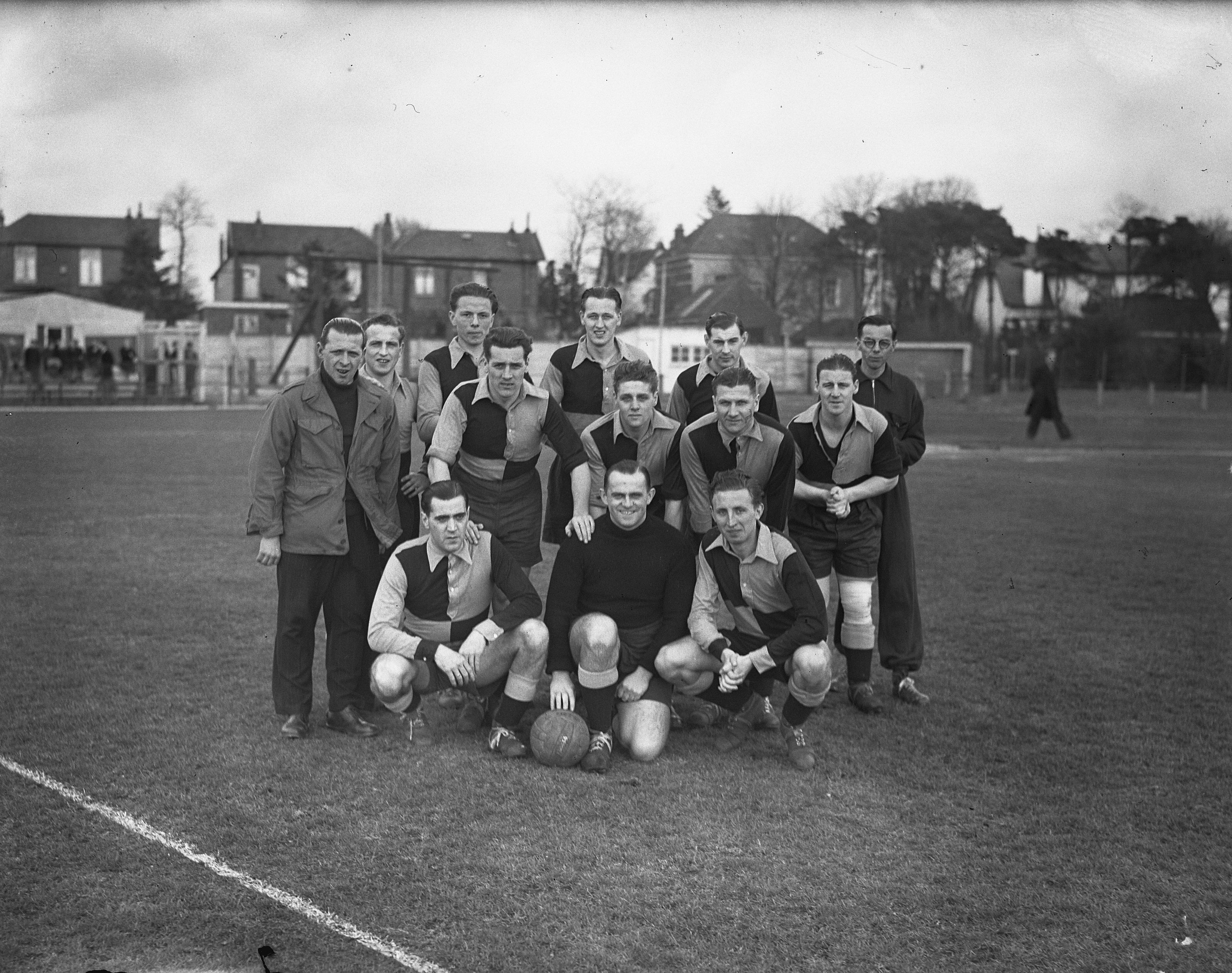
- The team on 20 March 1950
- Full name: Haarlemsche Football Club Eendracht Doet Overwinnen
- Founded: July 1, 1897; 129 years ago
- Ground: Noordersportpark; Haarlem, Netherlands
- Capacity: 1,000
- League: Eerste Klasse Zondag
- 2015–16: Sunday Hoofdklasse A, 11th
- Website: http://www.hfcedo.nl/

Haarlemsche Football Club Eendracht Doet Overwinnen (Dutch: Haarlemsche Football Club Unity Makes Win), known as HFC EDO or just EDO, is an amateur association football club in Haarlem, Netherlands. It competes in the 2017–18 Eerste Klasse league.
