= List of Dutch football champions =

- Founded: 1888
- Country: Netherlands
- Confederation: UEFA
- Number of clubs: 18
- Current champions: PSV (27th title) (2025–26)
- Most championships: Ajax (36 titles)
- Current: 2025–26 Eredivisie

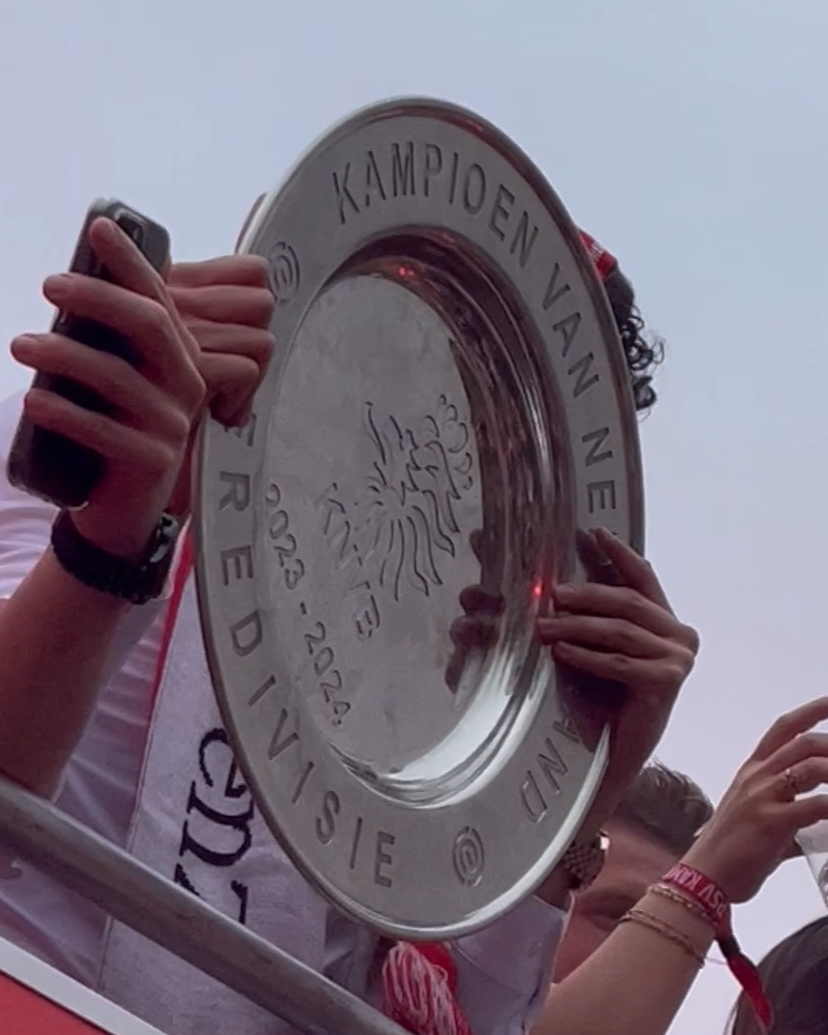
Imitation of the 2023–24 championship bowl

The Dutch football champions are the winners of the highest league in Dutch football, which since 1956 is the Eredivisie.

The championship was first awarded in 1898. Until 1954 the national champion was determined by means of a championship competition between the champions of the different regions. This system continued for two years after the introduction of professional football in 1954 until the creation of the Eredivisie for the 1956–57 season. Starting with the 1956–57 season, the winner of the Eredivisie is recognized as the national champion.

== List of champions ==
=== National Champions of the Netherlands (1888–1956) ===
Season	Winner
1888–89	VV Concordia (1)
1889–90	HFC (1)
1890–91	HVV (1)
1891–92	RAP (1)
1892–93	HFC (2)
1893–94	RAP (2)
1894–95	HFC (3)
1895–96	HVV (2)
1896–97	RAP (3)
1897–98	RAP (4)
1898–99	RAP (5)
1899–1900	HVV (3)
1900–01	HVV (4)
1901–02	HVV (5)
1902–03	HVV (6)
1903–04	HBS Craeyenhout (1)
1904–05	HVV (7)
1905–06	HBS Craeyenhout (2)
1906–07	HVV (8)
1907–08	Quick Den Haag (1)
1908–09	Sparta (1)
1909–10	HVV (9)
1910–11	Sparta (2)
1911–12	Sparta (3)
1912–13	Sparta (4)
1913–14	HVV (10)
1914–15	Sparta (5)
1915–16	Willem II (1)
1916–17	Go Ahead (1)
1917–18	Ajax (1)
1918–19	Ajax (2)
1919–20	Be Quick 1887 (1)
1920–21	NAC (1)
1921–22	Go Ahead (2)
1922–23	RCH (1)
1923–24	Feyenoord (1)
1924–25	HBS Craeyenhout (3)
1925–26	SC Enschede (1)
1926–27	Heracles (1)
1927–28	Feyenoord (2)
1928–29	PSV (1)
1929–30	Go Ahead (3)
1930–31	Ajax (3)
1931–32	Ajax (4)
1932–33	Go Ahead (4)
1933–34	Ajax (5)
1934–35	PSV (2)
1935–36	Feyenoord (3)
1936–37	Ajax (6)
1937–38	Feyenoord (4)
1938–39	Ajax (7)
1939–40	Feyenoord (5)
1940–41	Heracles (2)
1941–42	ADO (1)
1942–43	ADO (2)
1943–44	De Volewijckers (1)
1944–45	Not played due to worsening conditions following World War II
1945–46	Haarlem (1)
1946–47	Ajax (8)
1947–48	BVV Den Bosch (1)
1948–49	SVV (1)
1949–50	Limburgia (1)
1950–51	PSV (3)
1951–52	Willem II (2)
1952–53	RCH (2)
1953–54	FC Eindhoven (1)
1954–55	Willem II (3)
1955–56	Rapid JC (1)

=== Eredivisie (1956–) ===
Season	Winner	Top scorer(s)	Goals
1956–57	Ajax (9)	Coen Dillen	43
1957–58	D.O.S. (1)	Leo Canjels	32
1958–59	Sparta (6)	Leo Canjels	34
1959–60	Ajax (10)	Henk Groot	38
1960–61	Feyenoord (6)	Henk Groot	41
1961–62	Feyenoord (7)	Dick Tol	27
1962–63	PSV (4)	Pierre Kerkhofs	22
1963–64	DWS (1)	Frans Geurtsen	28
1964–65	Feyenoord (8)	Frans Geurtsen	23
1965–66	Ajax (11)	Willy van der Kuijlen / Piet Kruiver	23
1966–67	Ajax (12)	Johan Cruyff	33
1967–68	Ajax (13)	Ove Kindvall	28
1968–69	Feyenoord (9)	Dick van Dijk / Ove Kindvall	30
1969–70	Ajax (14)	Willy van der Kuijlen	26
1970–71	Feyenoord (10)	Ove Kindvall	24
1971–72	Ajax (15)	Johan Cruyff	25
1972–73	Ajax (16)	Cas Janssens / Willy Brokamp	18
1973–74	Feyenoord (11)	Willy van der Kuijlen	27
1974–75	PSV (5)	Ruud Geels	30
1975–76	PSV (6)	Ruud Geels	29
1976–77	Ajax (17)	Ruud Geels	34
1977–78	PSV (7)	Ruud Geels	30
1978–79	Ajax (18)	Kees Kist	34
1979–80	Ajax (19)	Kees Kist	27
1980–81	AZ '67 (1)	Ruud Geels	22
1981–82	Ajax (20)	Wim Kieft	32
1982–83	Ajax (21)	Peter Houtman	30
1983–84	Feyenoord (12)	Marco van Basten	28
1984–85	Ajax (22)	Marco van Basten	22
1985–86	PSV (8)	Marco van Basten	37
1986–87	PSV (9)	Marco van Basten	31
1987–88	PSV (10)	Wim Kieft	29
1988–89	PSV (11)	Romário	19
1989–90	Ajax (23)	Romário	23
1990–91	PSV (12)	Romário / Dennis Bergkamp	25
1991–92	PSV (13)	Dennis Bergkamp	22
1992–93	Feyenoord (13)	Dennis Bergkamp	26
1993–94	Ajax (24)	Jari Litmanen	26
1994–95	Ajax (25)	Ronaldo	30
1995–96	Ajax (26)	Luc Nilis	21
1996–97	PSV (14)	Luc Nilis	21
1997–98	Ajax (27)	Nikos Machlas	34
1998–99	Feyenoord (14)	Ruud van Nistelrooy	31
1999–2000	PSV (15)	Ruud van Nistelrooy	29
2000–01	PSV (16)	Mateja Kežman	24
2001–02	Ajax (28)	Pierre van Hooijdonk	24
2002–03	PSV (17)	Mateja Kežman	35
2003–04	Ajax (29)	Mateja Kežman	31
2004–05	PSV (18)	Dirk Kuyt	29
2005–06	PSV (19)	Klaas-Jan Huntelaar	33
2006–07	PSV (20)	Afonso Alves	34
2007–08	PSV (21)	Klaas-Jan Huntelaar	33
2008–09	AZ (2)	Mounir El Hamdaoui	23
2009–10	Twente (1)	Luis Suárez	35
2010–11	Ajax (30)	Björn Vleminckx	23
2011–12	Ajax (31)	Bas Dost	32
2012–13	Ajax (32)	Wilfried Bony	31
2013–14	Ajax (33)	Alfreð Finnbogason	29
2014–15	PSV (22)	Memphis Depay	22
2015–16	PSV (23)	Vincent Janssen	27
2016–17	Feyenoord (15)	Nicolai Jørgensen	21
2017–18	PSV (24)	Alireza Jahanbakhsh	21
2018–19	Ajax (34)	Luuk de Jong / Dušan Tadić	28
2019–20	Competition abandoned due to the COVID-19 pandemic		
2020–21	Ajax (35)	Giorgos Giakoumakis	26
2021–22	Ajax (36)	Sébastien Haller	21
2022–23	Feyenoord (16)	Anastasios Douvikas / Xavi Simons	19
2023–24	PSV (25)	Vangelis Pavlidis / Luuk de Jong	29
2024–25	PSV (26)	Sem Steijn	24
2025–26	PSV (27)	Ayase Ueda	25

== Titles ==
Information on clubs with the most titles won is provided in the following table, listing both overall title wins, and those since the start of the Eredivisie in 1956–57:

Club	Titles	
Club	Professional Era	Total
Ajax	28	36
PSV Eindhoven	24	27
Feyenoord	11	16
HVV	–	10
Sparta	1	6
Go Ahead	–	4
Willem II	–	3
HBS	–	3
AZ	2	2
ADO, Heracles, RCH, RAP	–	2
FC Twente, DOS, DWS	1	1
Be Quick, BVV, HFC, De Volewijckers, FC Eindhoven, Haarlem; Limburgia, NAC, Quick Den Haag, SVV, VV Concordia, SC Enschede, Rapid JC	–	1

== Most titles ==
A list of clubs by most titles won is shown in the following table:

Club	Winner	Runner-up	Winning years
Ajax	36	24	1917–18, 1918–19, 1930–31, 1931–32, 1933–34, 1936–37, 1938–39, 1946–47, 1956–57, 1959–60, 1965–66, 1966–67, 1967–68, 1969–70, 1971–72, 1972–73, 1976–77, 1978–79, 1979–80, 1981–82, 1982–83, 1984–85, 1989–90, 1993–94, 1994–95, 1995–96, 1997–98, 2001–02, 2003–04, 2010–11, 2011–12, 2012–13, 2013–14, 2018–19, 2020–21, 2021–22
PSV Eindhoven	27	16	1928–29, 1934–35, 1950–51, 1962–63, 1974–75, 1975–76, 1977–78, 1985–86, 1986–87, 1987–88, 1988–89, 1990–91, 1991–92, 1996–97, 1999–2000, 2000–01, 2002–03, 2004–05, 2005–06, 2006–07, 2007–08, 2014–15, 2015–16, 2017–18, 2023–24, 2024–25, 2025–26
Feyenoord	16	22	1923–24, 1927–28, 1935–36, 1937–38, 1939–40, 1960–61, 1961–62, 1964–65, 1968–69, 1970–71, 1973–74, 1983–84, 1992–93, 1998–99, 2016–17, 2022–23
HVV Den Haag	10	1	1890–91, 1895–96, 1899–1900, 1900–01, 1901–02, 1902–03, 1904–05, 1906–07, 1909–10, 1913–14
Sparta Rotterdam	6	–	1908–09, 1910–11, 1911–12, 1912–13, 1914–15, 1958–59
RAP	5	3	1891–92, 1893–94, 1896–97, 1897–98, 1898–99
Go Ahead Eagles	4	5	1916–17, 1921–22, 1929–30, 1932–33
Koninklijke HFC	3	3	1889–90, 1892–93, 1894–95
Willem II	3	1	1915–16, 1951–52, 1954–55
HBS Craeyenhout	3	–	1903–04, 1905–06, 1924–25
AZ	2	2	1980–81, 2008–09
Heracles Almelo	2	1	1926–27, 1940–41
ADO Den Haag	2	–	1941–42, 1942–43
RCH	2	–	1922–23, 1952–53
NAC Breda	1	4	1920–21
FC Twente	1	3	2009–10
DWS	1	3	1963–64
Roda JC Kerkrade*	1	2	1955–56
Be Quick	1	2	1919–20
FC Eindhoven	1	2	1953–54
SC Enschede	1	1	1925–26
DOS	1	1	1957–58
FC Den Bosch	1	1	1947–48
De Volewijckers	1	–	1943–44
HFC Haarlem	1	–	1945–46
Limburgia	1	–	1949–50
SVV	1	–	1948–49
Quick Den Haag	1	–	1907–08
VV Concordia	1	–	1888–89

^{*} As Rapid JC.

Percentage of titles won by club
1. Ajax - 36 (26.5%)
2. PSV Eindhoven - 27 (19.9%)
3. Feyenoord - 16 (11.8%)
4. HVV - 10 (7.40%)
5. Sparta - 6 (4.40%)
6. AVV RAP - 5 (3.70%)
7. Go Ahead - 4 (2.90%)
8. Koninklijke HFC - 3 (2.20%)
9. Willem II - 3 (2.20%)
10. HBS Craeyenhout - 3 (2.20%)
11. AZ - 2 (1.50%)
12. Heracles Almelo - 2 (1.50%)
13. ADO Den Haag - 2 (1.50%)
14. RCH - 2 (1.50%)
15. NAC Breda - 1 (0.70%)
16. FC Twente - 1 (0.70%)
17. DWS - 1 (0.70%)
18. Roda JC - 1 (0.70%)
19. Be Quick 1887 - 1 (0.70%)
20. FC Eindhoven - 1 (0.70%)
21. SC Enschede - 1 (0.70%)
22. DOS - 1 (0.70%)
23. FC Den Bosch - 1 (0.70%)
24. De Volewijckers - 1 (0.70%)
25. HFC Haarlem - 1 (0.70%)
26. SV Limburgia - 1 (0.70%)
27. SVV - 1 (0.70%)
28. Quick Den Haag - 1 (0.70%)
29. VV Concordia - 1 (0.70%)
- Other: 15 teams all with 1 title each.

== See also ==
- Eredivisie
- KNVB Cup
- Johan Cruyff Shield
- Big Three (Netherlands)
