= 1916–17 Netherlands Football League Championship =

Netherl. Football Championship
- Season: 1916–1917
- Champions: Go Ahead (1st title)

The Netherlands Football League Championship 1916–1917 was contested by 35 teams participating in four divisions. The national champion would be determined by a play-off featuring the winners of the eastern, northern, southern and western football division of the Netherlands. Go Ahead won this year's championship by beating UVV Utrecht, Willem II and Be Quick 1887.

== New entrants ==
Eerste Klasse East:

- Promoted from 2nd Division: SC Enschede

Eerste Klasse North: (new Division)

- Achilles 1894, Be Quick 1887, Veendam, GSAVV Forward, LAC Frisia 1883, Velocitas 1897 & WVV Winschoten

Eerste Klasse South:

- Promoted from 2nd Division: Zeelandia Middelburg

Eerste Klasse West:

- Promoted from 2nd Division: Blauw-Wit Amsterdam

== Divisions ==
=== Eerste Klasse East ===
Pos	Team	Pld	W	D	L	GF	GA	GD	Pts	Qualification
1	Go Ahead	16	10	3	3	37	8	+29	23	Qualified for Championship play-offs
2	SC Enschede	16	8	4	4	19	16	+3	20	
3	Quick Nijmegen	16	9	1	6	23	13	+10	19	
4	GVC Wageningen	16	6	5	5	29	25	+4	17	
5	HVV Tubantia	16	6	4	6	22	31	−9	16	
6	Be Quick Zutphen	16	4	6	6	26	27	−1	14	
7	Vitesse Arnhem	16	5	4	7	30	35	−5	14	
8	Robur et Velocitas	16	3	6	7	16	22	−6	12	
9	Koninklijke UD	16	3	3	10	19	44	−25	9	

Source: rsssf.com

=== Eerste Klasse North ===
Pos	Team	Pld	W	D	L	GF	GA	GD	Pts	Qualification
1	Be Quick 1887	12	9	2	1	68	21	+47	20	Qualified for Championship play-offs
2	Velocitas 1897	12	6	3	3	50	29	+21	15	
3	LAC Frisia 1883	12	6	1	5	36	29	+7	13	
4	WVV Winschoten	12	5	2	5	21	36	−15	12	
5	GSAVV Forward	12	3	3	6	21	28	−7	9	
6	Achilles 1894	12	3	3	6	33	56	−23	9	
7	Veendam	12	2	2	8	18	48	−30	6	

Source: rsssf.com

=== Eerste Klasse South ===
Pos	Team	Pld	W	D	L	GF	GA	GD	Pts	Qualification
1	Willem II	14	13	1	0	53	5	+48	27	Qualified for Championship play-offs
2	NAC	14	11	0	3	37	22	+15	22	
3	Zeelandia Middelburg	14	6	2	6	39	30	+9	14	
4	CVV Velocitas	14	5	3	6	26	26	0	13	
5	MSV Maastricht	14	5	2	7	21	19	+2	12	
6	MVV Maastricht	14	5	1	8	25	30	−5	11	
7	RKVV Wilhelmina	14	5	0	9	20	42	−22	10	
8	VVV Venlo	14	0	3	11	13	60	−47	3	

Source: rsssf.com

=== Eerste Klasse West ===
Pos	Team	Pld	W	D	L	GF	GA	GD	Pts	Qualification
1	UVV Utrecht	20	11	7	2	51	18	+33	29	Qualified for Championship play-offs
2	Sparta Rotterdam	20	12	4	4	42	40	+2	28	
3	HVV Den Haag	20	10	4	6	44	23	+21	24	
4	Blauw-Wit Amsterdam	20	9	5	6	34	27	+7	23	
5	VOC	20	7	5	8	35	35	0	19	
6	HFC Haarlem	20	9	1	10	35	47	−12	19	
7	DFC	20	8	2	10	44	47	−3	18	
8	HBS Craeyenhout	20	7	4	9	32	41	−9	18	
9	HV & CV Quick	20	6	5	9	29	39	−10	17	
10	Koninklijke HFC	20	5	4	11	29	35	−6	14	
11	USV Hercules	20	4	3	13	20	43	−23	11	

Source: rsssf.com

=== Championship play-off ===
Pos	Team	Pld	W	D	L	GF	GA	GD	Pts	GOA	UVV	WIL	BEQ
1	Go Ahead	6	5	1	0	15	7	+8	11		2–0	1–1	4–2
2	UVV Utrecht	6	3	1	2	12	5	+7	7	0–1		4–0	1–1
3	Willem II	6	2	1	3	11	12	−1	5	1–2	1–3		6–2
4	Be Quick 1887	6	0	1	5	8	22	−14	1	3–5	0–4	0–2	

Source: rsssf.com
