= 1923–24 Netherlands Football League Championship =

Netherl. Football Championship
- Season: 1923–1924
- Champions: Feijenoord (1st title)

The Netherlands Football League Championship 1923–1924 was contested by 51 teams participating in five divisions. The national champion would be determined by a play-off featuring the winners of the eastern, northern, southern and two western football divisions of the Netherlands. Feijenoord won this year's championship by beating Stormvogels, NAC, SC Enschede and Be Quick 1887.

== New entrants ==
Eerste Klasse East:

- Promoted from 2nd Division: Vitesse Arnhem

Eerste Klasse North:

- Promoted from 2nd Division: VV Leeuwarden

Eerste Klasse South:

- Promoted from 2nd Division: Alliance

Eerste Klasse West-I

- Six clubs moving in from last season's combined Western Division: AFC Ajax, Football Club Dordrecht, Feijenoord, HVV Den Haag, RCH and VOC
- Promoted from 2nd Division: HVV 't Gooi, Koninklijke HFC, SVV & ZFC

Eerste Klasse West-II

- Six clubs moving in from last season's combined Western Division: Blauw-Wit Amsterdam, HFC Haarlem, HBS Craeyenhout, HC & CV Quick, Sparta Rotterdam and UVV Utrecht
- Promoted from 2nd Division: Ajax Sportman Combinatie, SBV Excelsior, ODS and Stormvogels

== Divisions ==
=== Eerste Klasse East ===
Pos	Team	Pld	W	D	L	GF	GA	GD	Pts	Qualification or relegation
1	SC Enschede	18	12	4	2	48	23	+25	28	Qualified for Championship play-off
2	Go Ahead	18	12	2	4	49	16	+33	26	
3	ZAC	18	9	5	4	37	18	+19	23	
4	Enschedese Boys	18	10	2	6	34	33	+1	22	
5	Vitesse	18	6	6	6	30	34	−4	18	
6	Heracles	18	5	7	6	33	27	+6	17	
7	Quick Nijmegen	18	6	3	9	31	46	−15	15	
8	HVV Hengelo	18	4	6	8	17	30	−13	14	
9	Koninklijke UD	18	3	6	9	28	57	−29	12	
10	TSV Theole	18	0	5	13	18	41	−23	5	Relegated to 2nd Division

Source: rsssf.com

=== Eerste Klasse North ===
Pos	Team	Pld	W	D	L	GF	GA	GD	Pts	Qualification or relegation
1	Be Quick 1887	18	15	1	2	69	14	+55	31	Qualified for Championship play-off
2	Velocitas 1897	18	11	0	7	49	25	+24	22	
3	MVV Alcides	18	10	2	6	35	27	+8	22	
4	Veendam	18	7	6	5	27	21	+6	20	
5	Achilles 1894	18	6	5	7	32	43	−11	17	
6	VV Leeuwarden	18	7	2	9	27	35	−8	16	
7	LAC Frisia 1883	18	6	3	9	19	31	−12	15	
8	LVV Friesland	18	5	4	9	23	35	−12	14	
9	WVV Winschoten	18	4	5	9	25	42	−17	13	
10	Upright	18	3	4	11	13	46	−33	10	Relegated to 2nd Division

Source: rsssf.com

=== Eerste Klasse South ===
Pos	Team	Pld	W	D	L	GF	GA	GD	Pts	Qualification or relegation
1	NAC	20	13	5	2	46	15	+31	31	Qualified for Championship play-off
2	Willem II	20	14	2	4	52	22	+30	30	
3	RKVV Wilhelmina	20	8	7	5	39	29	+10	23	
4	NOAD	20	8	6	6	27	29	−2	22	
5	FC Eindhoven	20	9	3	8	31	29	+2	21	
6	PSV Eindhoven	20	9	3	8	36	34	+2	21	
7	MVV Maastricht	20	9	2	9	29	29	0	20	
8	Bredania	20	5	9	6	24	25	−1	19	
9	BVV Den Bosch	20	7	3	10	41	40	+1	17	
10	Alliance	20	4	1	15	17	57	−40	9	
11	SV DOSKO	20	1	5	14	13	46	−33	7	Relegated to 2nd Division

Source: rsssf.com

=== Eerste Klasse West-I ===
Pos	Team	Pld	W	D	L	GF	GA	GD	Pts	Qualification or relegation
1	Feijenoord	18	13	2	3	61	29	+32	28	Qualified for Championship play-off
2	Football Club Dordrecht	18	8	7	3	36	22	+14	23	Division West-II next season
3	HVV 't Gooi	18	9	4	5	35	39	−4	22	
4	VOC	18	9	3	6	33	35	−2	21	Division West-II next season
5	Koninklijke HFC	18	7	5	6	33	40	−7	19	
6	Ajax	18	7	3	8	35	27	+8	17	Division West-II next season
7	HVV Den Haag	18	6	4	8	40	42	−2	16	Division West-II next season
8	RCH	18	4	7	7	31	35	−4	15	Division West-II next season
9	ZFC	18	3	4	11	27	43	−16	10	
10	SVV	18	4	1	13	17	36	−19	9	Relegated to 2nd Division.

Source: rsssf.com

=== Eerste Klasse West-II ===
Pos	Team	Pld	W	D	L	GF	GA	GD	Pts	Qualification or relegation
1	Stormvogels	18	15	1	2	48	13	+35	31	Qualified for Championship play-off
2	Sparta Rotterdam	18	12	4	2	49	18	+31	28	Division West-I next season
3	HBS Craeyenhout	18	8	4	6	29	28	+1	20	
4	HFC Haarlem	18	7	6	5	33	33	0	20	Division West-I next season
5	SBV Excelsior	18	6	5	7	31	28	+3	17	
6	Blauw-Wit Amsterdam	18	5	7	6	20	22	−2	17	Division West-I next season
7	UVV Utrecht	18	7	1	10	33	42	−9	15	
8	Ajax Sportman Combinatie	18	5	4	9	29	37	−8	14	Division West-I next season
9	HC & CV Quick	18	3	3	12	18	39	−21	9	Division West-I next season
10	ODS	18	4	1	13	21	51	−30	9	Relegated to 2nd Division.

Source: rsssf.com

=== Championship play-off ===
Pos	Team	Pld	W	D	L	GF	GA	GD	Pts	FEY	STO	NAC	ENS	BEQ
1	Feijenoord	8	5	3	0	23	11	+12	13		2–2	2–2	6–2	3–1
2	Stormvogels	8	5	2	1	14	9	+5	12	1–1		2–0	2–1	3–1
3	NAC	8	3	1	4	11	15	−4	7	2–3	0–1		3–1	3–2
4	SC Enschede	8	2	0	6	11	17	−6	4	0–2	1–2	4–0		2–1
5	Be Quick 1887	8	2	0	6	10	17	−7	4	1–4	3–1	0–1	1–0	

Source: rsssf.com
