= 1915–16 Netherlands Football League Championship =

Netherl. Football Championship
- Season: 1915–1916
- Champions: Willem II (1st title)

The Netherlands Football League Championship 1915–1916 was contested by 26 teams participating in three divisions. The national champion would be determined by a play-off featuring the winners of the eastern, southern and western football division of the Netherlands. Willem II won this year's championship by beating Go Ahead and Sparta Rotterdam.

== New entrants ==
Eerste Klasse South: (returning after one season of suspension due to World War I).

- MSV Maastricht
- NAC
- RVV Roermond

== Divisions ==
=== Eerste Klasse East ===
Pos	Team	Pld	W	D	L	GF	GA	GD	Pts	Qualification
1	Go Ahead	14	9	3	2	32	17	+15	21	Qualified for Championship play-offs
2	Quick Nijmegen	14	9	2	3	20	9	+11	20	
3	Koninklijke UD	14	6	3	5	27	23	+4	15	
4	HVV Tubantia	14	6	2	6	28	31	−3	14	
5	Robur et Velocitas	14	6	1	7	37	36	+1	13	
6	Vitesse Arnhem	14	5	1	8	31	35	−4	11	
7	Be Quick Zutphen	14	4	2	8	29	37	−8	10	
8	GVC Wageningen	14	4	0	10	17	33	−16	8	

Source: rsssf.com

=== Eerste Klasse South ===
The Eerste Klasse South returned after being suspended for one season due to World War I.

Pos	Team	Pld	W	D	L	GF	GA	GD	Pts	Qualification
1	Willem II	14	12	2	0	65	15	+50	26	Qualified for Championship play-offs
2	NAC	14	7	3	4	35	20	+15	17	
3	CVV Velocitas	14	7	2	5	36	29	+7	16	
4	MSV Maastricht	14	6	4	4	26	29	−3	16	
5	MVV Maastricht	14	7	1	6	22	21	+1	15	
6	RKVV Wilhelmina	14	3	4	7	20	33	−13	10	
7	RVV Roermond	14	2	5	7	22	44	−22	9	Not participating next season
8	VVV Venlo	14	1	1	12	12	47	−35	3	

Source: rsssf.com

=== Eerste Klasse West ===
Pos	Team	Pld	W	D	L	GF	GA	GD	Pts	Qualification
1	Sparta Rotterdam	18	11	3	4	55	28	+27	25	Qualified for Championship play-offs
2	DFC	18	11	2	5	45	34	+11	24	
3	HBS Craeyenhout	18	8	4	6	37	37	0	20	
4	HV & CV Quick	18	8	3	7	37	28	+9	19	
5	VOC	18	7	5	6	26	30	−4	19	
6	Koninklijke HFC	18	6	5	7	35	38	−3	17	
7	UVV Utrecht	18	6	4	8	35	43	−8	16	
8	USV Hercules	18	6	3	9	25	38	−13	15	
9	HVV Den Haag	18	6	2	10	32	41	−9	14	
10	HFC Haarlem	18	3	5	10	27	37	−10	11	

Source: rsssf.com

=== Championship play-offs ===
Pos	Team	Pld	W	D	L	GF	GA	GD	Pts	WIL	GOA	SPA
1	Willem II	4	2	1	1	6	6	0	5		1–1	4–1
2	Go Ahead	4	1	2	1	6	4	+2	4	0–1		3–0
3	Sparta Rotterdam	4	1	1	2	7	9	−2	3	4–0	2–2	

Source: rsssf.com
