= 1914–15 Netherlands Football League Championship =

Netherl. Football Championship
- Season: 1914–1915
- Champions: Sparta Rotterdam (5th title)

The Netherlands Football League Championship 1914–1915 was contested by eighteen teams participating in two divisions. The national champion would be determined by a play-off featuring the winners of the eastern and western football division of the Netherlands. Sparta Rotterdam won this year's championship by beating Vitesse Arnhem 3–0 in a Championship Play-off Replay match.

Due to World War I there was no Eerste Klasse South competition, it was suspended for one season.

== New entrants ==
Eerste Klasse East:

- Be Quick Zutphen

Eerste Klasse West:

- USV Hercules (returning after three seasons of absence)

== Divisions ==
=== Eerste Klasse East ===
Pos	Team	Pld	W	D	L	GF	GA	GD	Pts	Qualification
1	Vitesse	14	8	4	2	44	22	+22	20	Qualified for Championship play-off
2	Go Ahead	14	8	2	4	32	24	+8	18	
3	Koninklijke UD	14	6	4	4	31	26	+5	16	
4	HVV Tubantia	14	6	4	4	23	24	−1	16	
5	Robur et Velocitas	14	6	2	6	48	36	+12	14	
6	Quick Nijmegen	14	4	6	4	31	35	−4	14	
7	GVC Wageningen	14	3	2	9	21	38	−17	8	
8	Be Quick Zutphen	14	3	0	11	19	44	−25	6	

Source: rsssf.com

=== Eerste Klasse West ===
Pos	Team	Pld	W	D	L	GF	GA	GD	Pts	Qualification
1	Sparta Rotterdam	18	13	2	3	61	26	+35	28	Qualified for Championship play-off
2	Koninklijke HFC	18	11	2	5	48	25	+23	24	
3	HVV Den Haag	18	11	2	5	58	32	+26	24	
4	HFC Haarlem	18	8	3	7	32	38	−6	19	
5	UVV Utrecht	18	6	5	7	22	31	−9	17	
6	DFC	18	7	3	8	26	44	−18	17	
7	USV Hercules	18	6	4	8	28	32	−4	16	
8	VOC	18	6	4	8	26	34	−8	16	
9	HBS Craeyenhout	18	5	3	10	23	37	−14	13	
10	HV & CV Quick	18	2	2	14	22	47	−25	6	

Source: rsssf.com

=== Championship play-off ===
Team 1	Agg.	Team 2	1st leg	2nd leg
Vitesse	one win each	Sparta Rotterdam	2–1	1–4

=== Replay ===
Team 1	Score	Team 2
Vitesse	0–3	Sparta Rotterdam

Sparta Rotterdam won the championship.
