= 1927–28 Netherlands Football League Championship =

Netherl. Football Championship
- Season: 1927–1928
- Champions: Feijenoord (2nd title)

The Netherlands Football League Championship 1927–1928 was contested by 50 teams participating in five divisions. The national champion would be determined by a play-off featuring the winners of the eastern, northern, southern and two western football divisions of the Netherlands. Feijenoord won this year's championship by beating AFC Ajax, NOAD, ZAC and Velocitas 1897.

== New entrants ==
Eerste Klasse East:

- Promoted from 2nd Division: AGOVV Apeldoorn

Eerste Klasse North:

- Promoted from 2nd Division: MVV Alcides

Eerste Klasse South:

- Promoted from 2nd Division: TSV LONGA

Eerste Klasse West-I:

- Moving in from West-II: HFC EDO, HBS Craeyenhout, FC Hilversum, VOC and UVV Utrecht

Eerste Klasse West-II:

- Moving in from West-I: Blauw-Wit Amsterdam, HVV 't Gooi, HVV Den Haag, Sparta Rotterdam and Stormvogels
- Promoted from 2nd Division: ADO Den Haag

== Divisions ==
=== Eerste Klasse East ===
Pos	Team	Pld	W	D	L	GF	GA	GD	Pts	Qualification or relegation
1	ZAC	19	13	1	5	54	33	+21	27	Qualified for Championship play-off
2	SC Enschede	19	12	1	6	64	38	+26	25	
3	AGOVV Apeldoorn	18	11	1	6	56	30	+26	23	
4	Enschedese Boys	18	9	1	8	44	49	−5	19	
5	Heracles	18	8	1	9	52	42	+10	17	
6	Go Ahead	18	8	1	9	34	48	−14	17	
7	FC Wageningen	18	6	4	8	41	47	−6	16	
8	Vitesse Arnhem	18	7	2	9	35	45	−10	16	
9	Robur et Velocitas	18	6	1	11	44	70	−26	13	
10	DOTO Deventer	18	4	1	13	28	50	−22	9	Relegated to 2nd Division

Source: rsssf.com

=== Eerste Klasse North ===
Pos	Team	Pld	W	D	L	GF	GA	GD	Pts	Qualification or relegation
1	Velocitas 1897	18	14	2	2	67	19	+48	30	Qualified for Championship play-off
2	LVV Friesland	18	11	2	5	62	33	+29	24	
3	VV Leeuwarden	18	8	3	7	47	42	+5	19	
4	MVV Alcides	18	7	4	7	35	54	−19	18	
5	Veendam	18	7	3	8	34	43	−9	17	
6	Be Quick 1887	18	7	2	9	40	52	−12	16	
7	Achilles 1894	18	6	3	9	51	45	+6	15	
8	GVAV Rapiditas	18	6	3	9	36	43	−7	15	
9	GVV Groningen	18	6	2	10	35	52	−17	14	
10	LAC Frisia 1883	18	5	2	11	24	48	−24	12	Relegated to 2nd Division

Source: rsssf.com

=== Eerste Klasse South ===
Pos	Team	Pld	W	D	L	GF	GA	GD	Pts	Qualification
1	NOAD	18	13	2	3	49	22	+27	28	Qualified for Championship play-off
2	NAC	18	12	2	4	50	30	+20	26	
3	RKVV Wilhelmina	18	11	4	3	36	26	+10	26	
4	FC Eindhoven	18	7	5	6	41	29	+12	19	
5	MVV Maastricht	18	7	4	7	33	29	+4	18	
6	PSV Eindhoven	18	6	2	10	36	45	−9	14	
7	Willem II	18	5	4	9	27	45	−18	14	
8	LONGA	18	6	1	11	33	39	−6	13	
9	RFC Roermond	18	5	1	12	27	43	−16	11	
10	BVV Den Bosch	18	3	5	10	33	57	−24	11	

Source: rsssf.com

=== Eerste Klasse West-I ===
Pos	Team	Pld	W	D	L	GF	GA	GD	Pts	Qualification or relegation
1	AFC Ajax	18	16	1	1	54	14	+40	33	Qualified for Championship play-off
2	DFC	18	13	3	2	62	32	+30	29	Division West-II next season
3	HFC EDO	18	10	3	5	45	30	+15	23	Division West-II next season
4	SBV Excelsior	18	9	1	8	47	42	+5	19	Division West-II next season
5	RCH	18	7	4	7	42	42	0	18	
6	FC Hilversum	18	7	2	9	39	41	−2	16	
7	VUC	18	6	1	11	50	55	−5	13	
8	HBS Craeyenhout	18	6	0	12	56	59	−3	12	Division West-II next season
9	UVV Utrecht	18	5	2	11	30	68	−38	12	
10	VOC	18	2	1	15	30	72	−42	5	Relegated to 2nd Division

Source: rsssf.com

=== Eerste Klasse West-II ===
Pos	Team	Pld	W	D	L	GF	GA	GD	Pts	Qualification or relegation
1	Feijenoord	18	13	3	2	55	20	+35	29	Qualified for Championship play-off
2	Sparta Rotterdam	18	8	5	5	38	29	+9	21	Division West-I next season
3	Blauw-Wit Amsterdam	18	8	3	7	35	35	0	19	
4	ADO Den Haag	18	7	4	7	46	49	−3	18	Division West-I next season
5	ZFC	18	8	1	9	45	42	+3	17	
6	Koninklijke HFC	18	6	5	7	31	34	−3	17	Division West-I next season
7	HVV 't Gooi	18	6	4	8	38	33	+5	16	
8	HVV Den Haag	18	6	3	9	32	48	−16	15	
9	Stormvogels	18	6	3	9	27	45	−18	15	Division West-I next season
10	De Spartaan	18	4	5	9	24	36	−12	13	Relegated to 2nd Division

Source: rsssf.com

=== Championship play-off ===
Pos	Team	Pld	W	D	L	GF	GA	GD	Pts	FEY	AJA	NOA	ZAC	VEL
1	Feijenoord	8	6	0	2	17	9	+8	12		1–0	2–0	1–4	2–1
2	AFC Ajax	8	4	2	2	18	9	+9	10	0–3		4–0	2–2	2–0
3	NOAD	8	3	2	3	15	15	0	8	2–1	0–0		4–1	4–1
4	ZAC	8	3	2	3	20	21	−1	8	0–2	2–6	4–4		4–0
5	Velocitas 1897	8	1	0	7	9	25	−16	2	2–5	1–4	2–1	2–3	

Source: rsssf.com
