= 1921–22 Netherlands Football League Championship =

Netherl. Football Championship
- Season: 1921–1922
- Champions: Go Ahead (2nd title)

The Netherlands Football League Championship 1921–1922 was contested by 43 teams participating in four divisions. The national champion would be determined by a play-off featuring the winners of the eastern, northern, southern and western football division of the Netherlands. Go Ahead won this year's championship by beating Blauw-Wit Amsterdam, NAC, and Be Quick 1887.

== New entrants ==
Eerste Klasse East:

- Promoted from 2nd Division: Heracles

Eerste Klasse North:

- Promoted from 2nd Division: Upright

Eerste Klasse South:

- Promoted from 2nd Division: PSV Eindhoven

Eerste Klasse West:

- Promoted from 2nd Division: Feijenoord (returning after two seasons of absence) & RCH

== Divisions ==
=== Eerste Klasse East ===
Pos	Team	Pld	W	D	L	GF	GA	GD	Pts	Qualification or relegation
1	Go Ahead	18	11	5	2	45	16	+29	27	Qualified for Championship play-off
2	HVV Hengelo	18	8	5	5	33	22	+11	21	
3	Heracles	18	9	3	6	27	21	+6	21	
4	Koninklijke UD	18	7	6	5	35	25	+10	20	
5	SC Enschede	18	8	3	7	33	22	+11	19	
6	ZAC	18	6	4	8	27	34	−7	16	
7	Quick Nijmegen	18	5	5	8	20	29	−9	15	
8	Be Quick Zutphen	18	4	6	8	26	38	−12	14	
9	TSV Theole	18	5	4	9	21	35	−14	14	
10	Vitesse Arnhem	18	5	3	10	24	49	−25	13	Relegated to 2nd Division

Source: rsssf.com

=== Eerste Klasse North ===
Pos	Team	Pld	W	D	L	GF	GA	GD	Pts	Qualification or relegation
1	Be Quick 1887	18	16	2	0	89	16	+73	34	Qualified for Championship play-off
2	Velocitas 1897	18	13	0	5	63	28	+35	26	
3	Achilles 1894	18	8	7	3	31	22	+9	23	
4	WVV Winschoten	18	11	1	6	45	38	+7	23	
5	LAC Frisia 1883	18	9	3	6	34	20	+14	21	
6	Veendam	18	8	3	7	24	26	−2	19	
7	MVV Alcides	18	5	4	9	23	44	−21	14	
8	Upright	18	3	3	12	16	41	−25	9	
9	GSAVV Forward	18	2	4	12	15	47	−32	8	
10	GVV Groningen	18	0	3	15	10	68	−58	3	Relegated to 2nd Division

Source: rsssf.com

=== Eerste Klasse South ===
Pos	Team	Pld	W	D	L	GF	GA	GD	Pts	Qualification or relegation
1	NAC	20	16	2	2	59	16	+43	34	Qualified for Championship play-off
2	Willem II	20	13	4	3	44	21	+23	30	
3	MVV Maastricht	20	13	1	6	40	21	+19	27	
4	Bredania	20	11	3	6	36	14	+22	25	
5	BVV Den Bosch	20	8	5	7	32	34	−2	21	
6	RKVV Wilhelmina	20	9	1	10	28	29	−1	19	
7	NOAD	20	5	9	6	20	24	−4	19	
8	SV DOSKO	20	7	2	11	23	46	−23	16	
9	Velocitas	20	4	3	13	30	50	−20	11	
10	PSV Eindhoven	20	3	3	14	23	50	−27	9	
11	VVV Venlo	20	2	5	13	17	47	−30	9	Relegated to 2nd Division

Source: rsssf.com

=== Eerste Klasse West ===
Pos	Team	Pld	W	D	L	GF	GA	GD	Pts	Qualification or relegation
1	Blauw-Wit Amsterdam	22	13	6	3	41	18	+23	32	Qualified for Championship play-off
2	Feijenoord	22	12	3	7	44	30	+14	27	
3	AFC Ajax	22	8	10	4	31	22	+9	26	
4	HFC Haarlem	22	9	7	6	43	39	+4	25	
5	VOC	22	7	7	8	40	52	−12	21	
6	HBS Craeyenhout	22	9	2	11	43	33	+10	20	
7	DFC	22	7	6	9	28	29	−1	20	
8	UVV Utrecht	22	8	4	10	29	40	−11	20	
9	HVV Den Haag	22	6	7	9	48	44	+4	19	
10	RCH	22	8	3	11	33	44	−11	19	
11	De Spartaan	22	7	4	11	32	42	−10	18	Relegated to 2nd Division
12	VVA	22	6	5	11	32	51	−19	17	Relegated to 2nd Division

Source: rsssf.com

=== Championship play-off ===
Pos	Team	Pld	W	D	L	GF	GA	GD	Pts	Qualification	GOA	BWA	NAC	BEQ
1	Go Ahead	6	2	3	1	8	7	+1	7	Play-off required as level on points		1–0	3–1	1–1
2	Blauw-Wit Amsterdam	6	3	1	2	7	7	0	7	Play-off required as level on points	1–1		1–3	1–0
3	NAC	6	3	0	3	10	10	0	6		3–1	1–2		1–3
4	Be Quick 1887	6	1	2	3	6	7	−1	4		1–1	1–2	0–1	

Source: rsssf.com

=== Play-off ===
Team 1	Score	Team 2
Go Ahead	1–0	Blauw-Wit Amsterdam

Go Ahead won the championship.
