= 1904–05 Netherlands Football League Championship =

Netherl. Football Championship
- Season: 1904–1905
- Champions: HVV Den Haag (7th title)

The Netherlands Football League Championship 1904–1905 was contested by eighteen teams participating in two divisions. The western division had been divided during the last two seasons, but was combined again. The national champion would be determined by a play-off featuring the winners of the eastern and western football division of the Netherlands. HVV Den Haag won this year's championship by beating PW 4-1 and 4–2.

== New entrants ==
Eerste Klasse East:

- RKVV Wilhelmina

Eerste Klasse West:

- DFC
- HV & CV Quick

== Divisions ==
=== Eerste Klasse East ===
| Pos | Team | Pld | W | D | L | GF | GA | GD | Pts | Qualification |
|---|---|---|---|---|---|---|---|---|---|---|
| 1 | PW | 10 | 8 | 0 | 2 | 44 | 15 | +29 | 16 | Qualified for Championship play-off |
| 2 | Vitesse Arnhem | 10 | 6 | 3 | 1 | 36 | 19 | +17 | 15 | |
| 3 | Quick Nijmegen | 10 | 4 | 2 | 4 | 26 | 26 | 0 | 10 | |
| 4 | U.D. | 10 | 3 | 1 | 6 | 24 | 30 | −6 | 7 | |
| 5 | RKVV Wilhelmina | 10 | 3 | 1 | 6 | 23 | 41 | −18 | 7 | |
| 6 | GVC Wageningen | 10 | 2 | 1 | 7 | 16 | 38 | −22 | 5 | |

Source: rsssf.com

=== Eerste Klasse West ===
| Pos | Team | Pld | W | D | L | GF | GA | GD | Pts | Qualification |
|---|---|---|---|---|---|---|---|---|---|---|
| 1 | HVV Den Haag | 22 | 12 | 6 | 4 | 61 | 32 | +29 | 30 | Qualified for Championship play-off |
| 2 | DFC | 22 | 12 | 6 | 4 | 62 | 39 | +23 | 30 | |
| 3 | Koninklijke HFC | 22 | 12 | 1 | 9 | 64 | 45 | +19 | 25 | |
| 4 | CVV Velocitas | 22 | 10 | 4 | 8 | 72 | 61 | +11 | 24 | |
| 5 | Sparta Rotterdam | 22 | 10 | 4 | 8 | 46 | 44 | +2 | 24 | |
| 6 | Ajax Sportman Combinatie | 22 | 10 | 3 | 9 | 59 | 53 | +6 | 23 | |
| 7 | Hercules | 22 | 10 | 3 | 9 | 52 | 47 | +5 | 23 | |
| 8 | HFC Haarlem | 22 | 10 | 2 | 10 | 73 | 54 | +19 | 22 | |
| 9 | HBS Craeyenhout | 22 | 9 | 4 | 9 | 63 | 51 | +12 | 22 | |
| 10 | HV & CV Quick | 22 | 8 | 6 | 8 | 53 | 46 | +7 | 22 | |
| 11 | RAP | 22 | 4 | 3 | 15 | 35 | 82 | −47 | 11 | Not participating next season |
| 12 | Rapiditas Rotterdam | 22 | 3 | 2 | 17 | 30 | 116 | −86 | 8 | Not participating next season |

Source: rsssf.com

=== Championship play-off ===
| Team 1 | Agg. | Team 2 | 1st leg | 2nd leg |
|---|---|---|---|---|
| HVV Den Haag | 8–3 | PW | 4–1 | 4–2 |

HVV Den Haag won the championship.
