= 1903–04 Netherlands Football League Championship =

Netherl. Football Championship
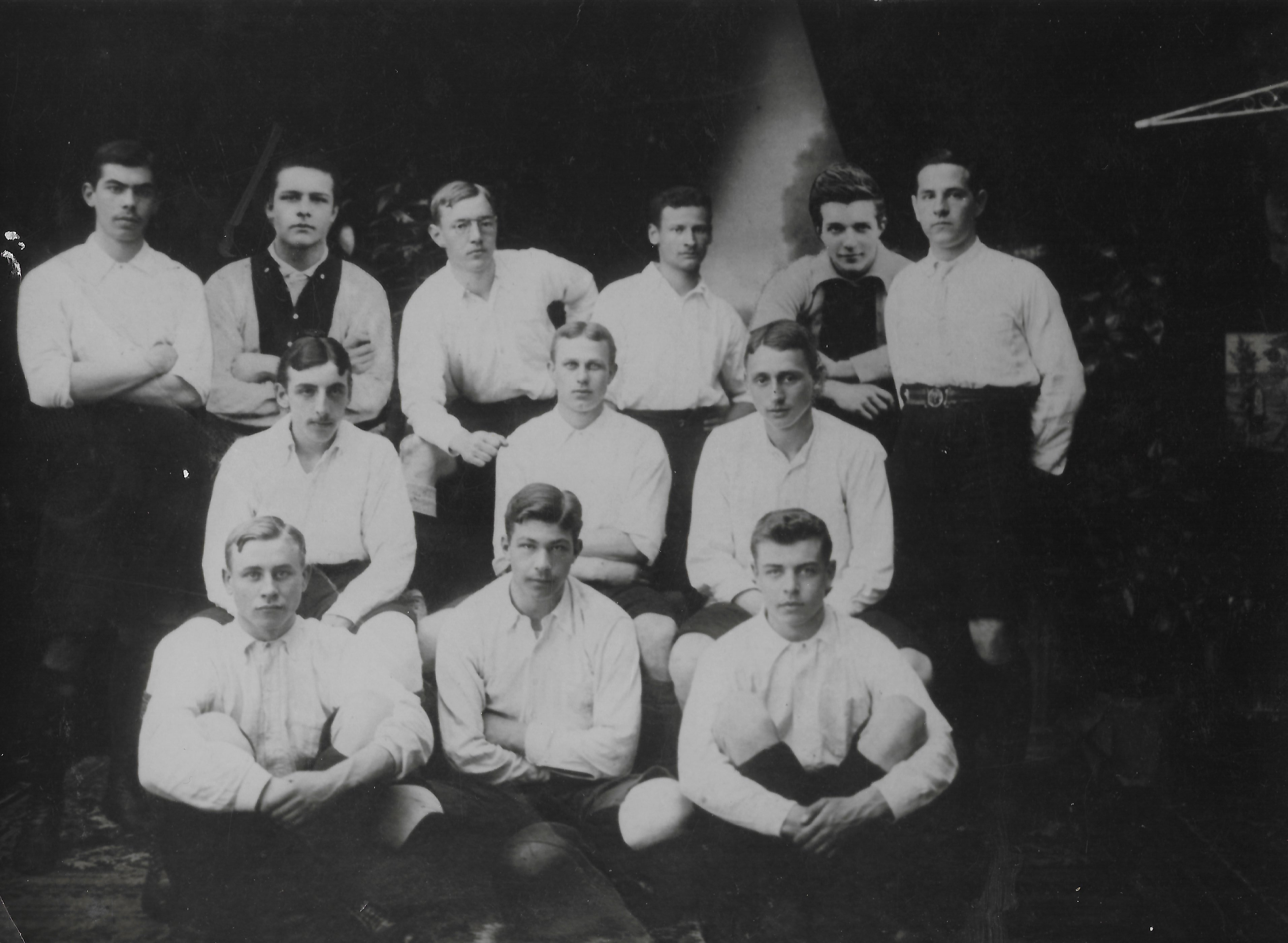
- HBS Champion of the Netherlands season 1903-1904. Back row: F.H. van de Broek d’Obrenan, D.J. Steenstra Tousaint, C. Bekker, A.F. Lens, H.K. Mijer and F.W. Slangen. Middle row from left to right: C.D. Canneel, K.W.H. Gleenewinkel Kamperdijk and C.C.L. Schippers. Front row from left to right: K.G. van Leijden, G.J.M. van Weel and E.V. van Leijden.
- Season: 1903–1904
- Champions: HBS Craeyenhout (1st title)

The Netherlands Football League Championship 1903–1904 was contested by seventeen teams participating in three divisions. This season, the western division had been split in two, creating the Eerste Klasse West-A and the Eerste Klasse West-B. The national champion would be determined by a play-off featuring the winners of the three divisions of the Netherlands. HBS Craeyenhout won this year's championship by beating Velocitas and PW.

== New entrants ==
Eerste Klasse East:

- GVC Wageningen, the result of a merger between last years competitors Go Ahead Wageningen and Victoria Wageningen

Eerste Klasse West-A:
Moved from Division West-B:

- HBS Craeyenhout
- Koninklijke HFC
- Quick 1890

Eerste Klasse West-B:
Moved from Division West-A:

- HFC Haarlem
- HVV Den Haag
- Velocitas

== Divisions ==
=== Eerste Klasse East ===
Pos	Team	Pld	W	D	L	GF	GA	GD	Pts	Qualification
1	PW	8	5	1	2	32	19	+13	11	Qualified for Championship play-off
2	Vitesse Arnhem	8	4	2	2	28	15	+13	10	
3	U.D.	8	4	2	2	13	14	−1	10	
4	Quick Nijmegen	8	2	1	5	10	25	−15	5	
5	GVC Wageningen	8	1	2	5	11	21	−10	4	

Source: rsssf.com

=== Eerste Klasse West-A ===
Pos	Team	Pld	W	D	L	GF	GA	GD	Pts	Qualification
1	HBS Craeyenhout	10	7	1	2	42	15	+27	15	Qualified for Championship play-off
2	Koninklijke HFC	10	7	1	2	38	21	+17	15	
3	Sparta Rotterdam	10	5	1	4	28	23	+5	11	
4	RAP	10	5	0	5	29	33	−4	10	
5	Ajax Sportman Combinatie	10	4	1	5	25	25	0	9	
6	Quick 1890	10	0	0	10	4	49	−45	0	Not participating next season

Source: rsssf.com

=== Eerste Klasse West-B ===
Pos	Team	Pld	W	D	L	GF	GA	GD	Pts	Qualification
1	Velocitas	10	7	1	2	38	18	+20	15	Qualified for Championship play-off
2	HVV Den Haag	10	5	2	3	31	15	+16	12	
3	Hercules	10	4	3	3	34	21	+13	11	
4	HFC Haarlem	10	4	3	3	32	27	+5	11	
5	Rapiditas Rotterdam	10	4	0	6	13	36	−23	8	
6	Volharding	10	0	3	7	10	41	−31	3	Not participating next season

Source: rsssf.com

=== Championship play-off ===
Pos	Team	Pld	W	D	L	GF	GA	GD	Pts	HBS	VEL	PW
1	HBS Craeyenhout	4	2	1	1	7	6	+1	5		2–1	3–0
2	Velocitas	4	1	2	1	11	5	+6	4	1–1		7–0
3	PW	4	1	1	2	6	13	−7	3	4–1	2–2	

Source: rsssf.com
