= 1909–10 Netherlands Football League Championship =

Netherl. Football Championship
- Season: 1909–1910
- Champions: HVV Den Haag (9th title)

The Netherlands Football League Championship 1909–1910 was contested by seventeen teams participating in two divisions. The national champion would be determined by a play-off featuring the winners of the eastern and western football division of the Netherlands. HVV Den Haag won this year's championship by beating Quick Nijmegen 2-0 and 3–2.

== New entrant ==
Eerste Klasse East:

- Quick Nijmegen returned after one season of absence

== Divisions ==
=== Eerste Klasse East ===
Pos	Team	Pld	W	D	L	GF	GA	GD	Pts	Qualification
1	Quick Nijmegen	12	9	2	1	25	14	+11	20	Qualified for Championship play-off
2	GVC Wageningen	12	7	0	5	39	21	+18	14	
3	U.D.	12	5	3	4	23	27	−4	13	
4	Bredania/'t Zesde	12	4	3	5	21	19	+2	11	Moved to Eerste Klasse West
5	Vitesse Arnhem	12	5	1	6	16	17	−1	11	
6	EFC PW 1885	12	5	1	6	28	40	−12	11	
7	RKVV Wilhelmina	12	1	2	9	13	27	−14	4	

Source: rsssf.com

=== Eerste Klasse West ===
Pos	Team	Pld	W	D	L	GF	GA	GD	Pts	Qualification
1	HVV Den Haag	18	13	2	3	63	22	+41	28	Qualified for Championship play-off
2	Sparta Rotterdam	18	10	5	3	46	25	+21	25	
3	CVV Velocitas	18	11	3	4	49	30	+19	25	
4	HV & CV Quick	18	8	5	5	34	24	+10	21	
5	DFC	18	9	2	7	40	27	+13	20	
6	HFC Haarlem	18	7	4	7	29	30	−1	18	
7	HBS Craeyenhout	18	5	4	9	22	38	−16	14	
8	Koninklijke HFC	18	4	3	11	25	40	−15	11	
9	USV Hercules	18	4	2	12	23	58	−35	10	
10	Ajax Sportman Combinatie	18	3	2	13	23	60	−37	8	Not participating next season

Source: rsssf.com

=== Championship play-off ===
Team 1	Agg.	Team 2	1st leg	2nd leg
HVV Den Haag	5–2	Quick Nijmegen	2–0	3–2

HVV Den Haag won the championship.
