= 1905–06 Netherlands Football League Championship =

Sportseason of a dutch competition

Netherl. Football Championship
- Season: 1905–1906
- Champions: HBS Craeyenhout (2nd title)

The Netherlands Football League Championship 1905–1906 was contested by sixteen teams participating in two divisions. The national champion would be determined by a play-off featuring the winners of the eastern and western football division of the Netherlands. HBS Craeyenhout won this year's championship by beating PW 3-2 and 4–2.

== Divisions ==
=== Eerste Klasse East ===
Pos	Team	Pld	W	D	L	GF	GA	GD	Pts	Qualification
1	PW	10	8	2	0	47	16	+31	18	Qualified for Championship play-off
2	U.D.	10	5	2	3	30	28	+2	12	
3	RKVV Wilhelmina	10	5	1	4	35	38	−3	11	
4	Vitesse Arnhem	10	4	1	5	32	28	+4	9	
5	GVC Wageningen	10	4	0	6	40	39	+1	8	
6	Quick Nijmegen	10	1	0	9	24	59	−35	2	

Source: rsssf.com

=== Eerste Klasse West ===
Pos	Team	Pld	W	D	L	GF	GA	GD	Pts	Qualification
1	HBS Craeyenhout	18	13	1	4	59	33	+26	27	Qualified for Championship play-off
2	HVV Den Haag	18	10	3	5	46	28	+18	23	
3	Koninklijke HFC	18	9	4	5	49	32	+17	22	
4	Sparta Rotterdam	18	9	2	7	42	40	+2	20	
5	Ajax Sportman Combinatie	18	7	3	8	37	48	−11	17	
6	DFC	18	6	4	8	45	43	+2	16	
7	CVV Velocitas	18	6	3	9	43	61	−18	15	
8	USV Hercules	18	5	4	9	38	50	−12	14	
9	HFC Haarlem	18	5	3	10	39	47	−8	13	
10	HV & CV Quick	18	5	3	10	29	45	−16	13	

Source: rsssf.com

=== Championship play-off ===
Team 1	Agg.	Team 2	1st leg	2nd leg
HBS Craeyenhout	7–4	PW	3–2	4–2

HBS Craeyenhout won the championship.
