= Zilveren Bal =

Annual football tournament in Rotterdam

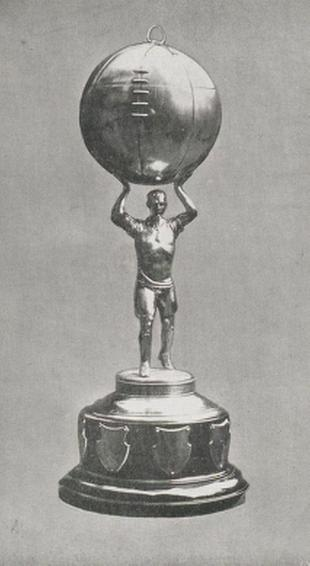
- The second Zilveren Bal (1904–1924)
- Founded: 1901
- Abolished: 1956
- Region: Netherlands
- Last champions: CASG Paris (1st title)
- Most championships: Royale Union Saint-Gilloise (3 titles)

The Zilveren Bal (Dutch: Silver Ball) was a football tournament featuring clubs from the Netherlands that was held annually in Rotterdam prior to each season from 1901 to 1956.

The tournament was created in 1901 by Sparta Rotterdam, in the aftermath of their relegation from the top-flight. The trophy is a ball made up of silver, hence its name. The Zilveren Bal tournament was for many years the most important cup tournament in the Netherlands, even more important than the Holdert Cup (now known as KNVB Cup). The hosts Sparta never succeeded in lifting the silver ball, unlike the likes of HVV Den Haag, HBS Craeyenhout, and Feijenoord. With the entry of professional football in the Netherlands in 1954, the tournament lost its status and slowly disappeared.

== History ==
=== Origins ===
At the turn of the century, the board of the Dutch Football Association (KNVB) was mostly consisted of Spartans, members of Sparta Rotterdam. Their strong grip on KNVB, however, was not able to save the club of being relegated from the Eerste Klasse West at the end of the 1900–01 season, which left Rapiditas Rotterdam as the only top-flight club from the city of Rotterdam. This arose the fear that the standard of Rotterdam football would decline, and thus, a few men from Rotterdam, Cees van Hasselt, Jacob Musley, and John. J. Meyer, decided to form the Zilveren Voetbal Commissie (Silver Football Committee), which was set up to organize an annual tournament for clubs from the first and second divisions of the Netherlands.

There was a trophy at stake, known at the time as the ZVC challenge cup, which was a ball made up of silver, hence the name of the tournament. The Zilveren Bal would be contested annually, and they were traditionally played on the fields of Sparta Rotterdam, the Sparta Stadion Het Kasteel in Rotterdam. The Zilveren Bal was to become the property of the first club to win it three times in a row or five times overall.

=== The three Zilveren Bals ===
Sparta used its influence to invite five clubs (Dutch champions HVV Den Haag, Belgian league runners-up Beerschot from Antwerp, newly promoted HFC Haarlem, and city rivals Rapiditas and Olympia) for a tournament played just before the start of the 1901–02 season. HVV earned the right to keep the trophy permanently after winning each of the very first three editions of the competition between 1901 and 1903, and doing it so always as the reigning Dutch champions. The trophy was thus handed to HVV and a new Zilveren Bal was commissioned, and this one lasted much longer since it was contested on twenty occasions (the 1914 edition was canceled due to the general mobilization after the outbreak of World War I) before HBS Craeyenhout won it for the fifth time in 1924, which meant that the second trophy also ended up in Den Haag, owned by De Kraaien.

By then, many similar pre-season tournaments had been set up in the country, and clubs from Amsterdam did not enter anymore, such as Ajax and Blauw Wit, who had been the last participants from the capital in 1917, when a record 24 clubs entered the competition. Likewise, the clubs from Antwerp and Haarlem very rarely; instead, participation was dominated by clubs from Rotterdam, Den Haag, nearby towns like Dordrecht and Schiedam, and clubs from the south and east of the Netherlands. The third Zilveren Bal was contested for 13 years, from 1924 to 1937, and during that time the cup was only twice taken out of Rotterdam. Feĳenoord obtained permanent ownership of the trophy in 1937 after beating Sparta in a final that was to settle the destination of the trophy one way or the other.

=== Decline ===
The tournament continued to be played annually, also during World War II, with the list of winners obtaining an increasingly southern flavour. For instance, BVV Den Bosch won twice in a row in 1945 and 1946, and only narrowly failed to secure the permanent possession of the fourth trophy as they lost their 1947 semifinal on penalties. VVV-Venlo won the last regular edition in 1954.

After the 1954 tournament, professional football was introduced within the KNVB, which was not intending to keep up with the amateur spirit of the Zilveren Voetbal Commissie (ZVC), and thus, no tournament was held in 1955, since the organizers were committed to amateurism. In 1956, ZVC tried once more to hold the tournament in Rotterdam with only amateur associations, and indeed, this final edition was contested between eight amateur clubs. In the final match, HVV beat CVV and was thus the last to win it, and due to the subsequent abolition of the ZVC, HVV came into possession of the fourth and last Silver Ball.

=== Revival ===
On 15 November 2010, Feyenoord and Sparta announced that they wanted to restore the Silver Ball tradition. An interesting detail is that both clubs were permanently excluded from participating in this tournament as professional clubs in 1956, because professional football did not fit the amateur spirit of the Zilveren Bal.

A somewhat peculiar epilogue followed more than half a century after the last edition in Rotterdam, when the two record winners, Feyenoord (as they are spelled since 1971) and Sparta Rotterdam (who added the name of their home city to their official denomination in 2004) organized a match at Spangen on 5 January 2011 to "restore the tradition". However, they failed to follow that tradition since the original tournament was never a one-off match, never was played in the winter, or ever allowed the entrance of professional clubs. The 2011 match finished 4–2 for Feyenoord, but was not repeated, thanks at least in part to vocal public outrage generated by indignant football historians.

== The tournament ==
The tournament format is exactly the same as that of any other cup tournament. It is a one-off knock-out competition.

All tournaments below were held in Rotterdam (at the various grounds of Sparta), with two exceptions: the 1907 edition was played in Haarlem because Sparta's stadium was undergoing renovation (HVV would have liked to have organized it in Den Haag, but the ZVC preferred the financial arrangements offered in Haarlem) and the 1909 edition, which was moved to Den Haag because of an outbreak of cholera in Rotterdam.
