= 1906–07 Netherlands Football League Championship =

Netherl. Football Championship
- Season: 1906–1907
- Champions: HVV Den Haag (8th title)

The Netherlands Football League Championship 1906–1907 was contested by seventeen teams participating in two divisions. The national champion would be determined by a play-off featuring the winners of the eastern and western football division of the Netherlands. HVV Den Haag won this year's championship by beating PW 5-3 and 4–1.

== New entrant ==
Eerste Klasse East:

- AFC Quick 1890 returned after two seasons of absence

== Divisions ==
=== Eerste Klasse East ===
Pos	Team	Pld	W	D	L	GF	GA	GD	Pts	Qualification
1	EFC PW 1885	12	10	1	1	54	13	+41	21	Qualified for Championship play-off
2	GVC Wageningen	12	7	1	4	45	27	+18	15	
3	U.D.	12	6	1	5	45	37	+8	13	
4	Quick Nijmegen	12	6	1	5	29	29	0	13	
5	Quick 1890	12	5	1	6	26	38	−12	11	
6	Vitesse Arnhem	12	3	1	8	22	40	−18	7	
7	RKVV Wilhelmina	12	2	0	10	13	50	−37	4	

Source: rsssf.com

=== Eerste Klasse West ===
Pos	Team	Pld	W	D	L	GF	GA	GD	Pts	Qualification
1	HVV Den Haag	18	14	3	1	72	19	+53	31	Qualified for Championship play-off
2	Koninklijke HFC	18	14	2	2	71	34	+37	30	
3	USV Hercules	18	7	6	5	46	33	+13	20	
4	HBS Craeyenhout	18	8	2	8	51	55	−4	18	
5	HV & CV Quick	18	7	3	8	43	32	+11	17	
6	HFC Haarlem	18	7	2	9	30	40	−10	16	
7	Ajax Sportman Combinatie	18	6	2	10	36	68	−32	14	
8	Sparta Rotterdam	18	4	5	9	27	49	−22	13	
9	CVV Velocitas	18	4	3	11	33	58	−25	11	
10	DFC	18	4	2	12	37	58	−21	10	

Source: rsssf.com

=== Championship play-off ===
Team 1	Agg.	Team 2	1st leg	2nd leg
EFC PW 1885	4–9	HVV Den Haag	3–5	1–4

HVV Den Haag won the championship.
