= 1929–30 Netherlands Football League Championship =

Netherl. Football Championship
- Season: 1929–1930
- Champions: Go Ahead (3rd title)

The Netherlands Football League Championship 1929–1930 was contested by 50 teams participating in five divisions. The national champion would be determined by a play-off featuring the winners of the eastern, northern, southern and two western football divisions of the Netherlands. Go Ahead won this year's championship by beating AFC Ajax, Velocitas 1897, Willem II and Blauw-Wit Amsterdam.

== New entrants ==
Eerste Klasse East:

- Promoted from 2nd Division: PEC Zwolle

Eerste Klasse North:

- Promoted from 2nd Division: LAC Frisia 1883

Eerste Klasse West-I:

- Moving in from West-II: DFC, HBS Craeyenhout, SBV Excelsior and VSV
- Promoted from 2nd Division: HFC Haarlem

Eerste Klasse West-II:

- Moving in from West-I: Hermes DVS, Koninklijke HFC, Stormvogels and VUC

== Divisions ==
=== Eerste Klasse East ===
Pos	Team	Pld	W	D	L	GF	GA	GD	Pts	Qualification
1	Go Ahead	18	14	3	1	72	25	+47	31	Qualified for Championship play-off
2	SC Enschede	18	11	2	5	51	28	+23	24	
3	AGOVV Apeldoorn	18	8	6	4	56	44	+12	22	
4	Heracles	18	8	4	6	42	47	−5	20	
5	ZAC	18	8	3	7	42	40	+2	19	
6	HVV Tubantia	18	5	5	8	42	46	−4	15	
7	FC Wageningen	18	6	2	10	42	52	−10	14	
8	Vitesse Arnhem	18	3	6	9	40	60	−20	12	
9	Robur et Velocitas	18	5	2	11	36	69	−33	12	
10	PEC Zwolle	18	5	1	12	47	59	−12	11	

Source: rsssf.com

=== Eerste Klasse North ===
Pos	Team	Pld	W	D	L	GF	GA	GD	Pts	Qualification or relegation
1	Velocitas 1897	18	13	3	2	61	32	+29	29	Qualified for Championship play-off
2	Veendam	18	10	3	5	58	28	+30	23	
3	LAC Frisia 1883	18	10	2	6	42	36	+6	22	
4	Achilles 1894	18	8	4	6	46	41	+5	20	
5	Be Quick 1887	18	8	1	9	43	39	+4	17	
6	GVAV Rapiditas	18	5	6	7	36	42	−6	16	
7	LVV Friesland	18	6	4	8	39	49	−10	16	
8	VV Leeuwarden	18	7	0	11	46	56	−10	14	
9	MVV Alcides	18	6	1	11	44	58	−14	13	
10	WVV Winschoten	18	4	2	12	37	71	−34	10	Relegated to 2nd Division

Source: rsssf.com

=== Eerste Klasse South ===
Pos	Team	Pld	W	D	L	GF	GA	GD	Pts	Qualification or relegation
1	Willem II	18	14	3	1	56	22	+34	31	Qualified for Championship play-off
2	PSV Eindhoven	18	12	1	5	64	36	+28	25	
3	NAC	18	11	3	4	40	27	+13	25	
4	NOAD	18	8	4	6	40	33	+7	20	
5	BVV Den Bosch	18	8	0	10	51	49	+2	16	
6	MVV Maastricht	18	8	0	10	26	41	−15	16	
7	FC Eindhoven	18	6	3	9	35	50	−15	15	
8	LONGA	18	5	2	11	38	43	−5	12	
9	RKVV Wilhelmina	18	4	2	12	32	52	−20	10	
10	RFC Roermond	18	4	2	12	26	55	−29	10	Relegated to 2nd Division

Source: rsssf.com

=== Eerste Klasse West-I ===
Pos	Team	Pld	W	D	L	GF	GA	GD	Pts	Qualification or relegation
1	AFC Ajax	18	11	3	4	52	22	+30	25	Qualified for Championship play-off
2	RCH	18	9	4	5	53	37	+16	22	Division West-II next season
3	ADO Den Haag	18	8	6	4	45	33	+12	22	Division West-II next season
4	FC Hilversum	18	9	3	6	39	41	−2	21	Division West-II next season
5	HBS Craeyenhout	18	8	3	7	48	47	+1	19	
6	VSV	18	7	5	6	37	38	−1	19	Division West-II next season
7	SBV Excelsior	18	6	4	8	49	53	−4	16	
8	Sparta Rotterdam	18	6	4	8	38	43	−5	16	Division West-II next season
9	DFC	18	5	5	8	37	43	−6	15	
10	HFC Haarlem	18	1	3	14	36	77	−41	5	Relegated to 2nd Division

Source: rsssf.com

=== Eerste Klasse West-II ===
Pos	Team	Pld	W	D	L	GF	GA	GD	Pts	Qualification
1	Blauw-Wit Amsterdam	19	10	6	3	39	26	+13	26	Qualified for Championship play-off
2	ZFC	19	11	2	6	61	40	+21	24	Division West-I next season
3	Feijenoord	18	9	3	6	53	31	+22	21	
4	Hermes DVS	18	6	7	5	36	44	−8	19	Division West-I next season
5	HFC EDO	18	7	4	7	43	41	+2	18	
6	Koninklijke HFC	18	6	5	7	40	43	−3	17	Division West-I next season
7	HVV Den Haag	18	7	3	8	41	46	−5	17	
8	Stormvogels	18	7	2	9	39	43	−4	16	Division West-I next season
9	HVV 't Gooi	18	6	2	10	28	46	−18	14	Division West-I next season
10	VUC	18	4	2	12	37	57	−20	10	Division West-I next season

Source: rsssf.com

=== Championship play-off ===
Pos	Team	Pld	W	D	L	GF	GA	GD	Pts	GOA	AJA	VEL	WIL	BWA
1	Go Ahead	8	4	2	2	19	14	+5	10		0–1	2–2	3–1	5–3
2	AFC Ajax	8	4	1	3	19	8	+11	9	3–0		8–0	7–2	0–0
3	Velocitas 1897	8	3	3	2	13	16	−3	9	1–4	2–0		1–1	4–1
4	Willem II	8	2	2	4	14	18	−4	6	2–2	3–0	0–3		4–0
5	Blauw-Wit Amsterdam	8	2	2	4	8	17	−9	6	1–3	1–0	0–0	2–1	

Source: rsssf.com
