= 1911–12 Netherlands Football League Championship =

Netherl. Football Championship
- Season: 1911–1912
- Champions: Sparta Rotterdam (3rd title)

The Netherlands Football League Championship 1911–1912 was contested by eighteen teams participating in two divisions. The national champion would be determined by a play-off featuring the winners of the eastern and western football division of the Netherlands. Sparta Rotterdam won this year's championship by beating GVC Wageningen 3-1 and 5–0.

== New entrants ==
Eerste Klasse East:

- Go Ahead
- ZAC

Eerste Klasse West:

- AFC Ajax

== Divisions ==
=== Eerste Klasse East ===
Pos	Team	Pld	W	D	L	GF	GA	GD	Pts	Qualification
1	GVC	14	11	2	1	38	14	+24	24	Qualified for Championship play-off
2	RKVV Wilhelmina	14	7	3	4	34	23	+11	17	
3	Quick Nijmegen	14	6	3	5	23	19	+4	15	
4	U.D.	14	7	1	6	27	23	+4	15	
5	Go Ahead	14	6	2	6	29	26	+3	14	
6	Vitesse Arnhem	14	6	1	7	21	26	−5	13	
7	EFC PW 1885	14	2	4	8	18	35	−17	8	
8	ZAC	14	2	2	10	12	36	−24	6	Not participating next season

Source: rsssf.com

=== Eerste Klasse West ===
Pos	Team	Pld	W	D	L	GF	GA	GD	Pts	Qualification
1	Sparta Rotterdam	18	10	3	5	42	22	+20	23	Qualified for Championship play-off
2	DFC	18	10	3	5	40	28	+12	23	
3	HV & CV Quick	18	9	3	6	30	22	+8	21	
4	Koninklijke HFC	18	10	0	8	49	35	+14	20	
5	HVV Den Haag	18	9	1	8	39	37	+2	19	
6	VOC	18	7	3	8	30	29	+1	17	
7	HFC Haarlem	18	7	2	9	39	46	−7	16	
8	AFC Ajax	18	4	7	7	25	33	−8	15	
9	CVV Velocitas	18	4	7	7	20	41	−21	15	
10	HBS Craeyenhout	18	4	3	11	21	42	−21	11	

Source: rsssf.com

=== Championship play-off ===
Team 1	Agg.	Team 2	1st leg	2nd leg
GVC Wageningen	1–8	Sparta Rotterdam	1–3	0–5

Sparta Rotterdam won the championship.
