= 1908–09 Netherlands Football League Championship =

Netherl. Football Championship
- Season: 1908–1909
- Champions: Sparta Rotterdam (1st title)

The Netherlands Football League Championship 1908–1909 was contested by seventeen teams participating in two divisions. The national champion would be determined by a play-off featuring the winners of the eastern and western football division of the Netherlands. Sparta Rotterdam won this year's championship by beating RKVV Wilhelmina 6-2 and 4–1.

== New entrant ==
Eerste Klasse East:

- Bredania/'t Zesde

== Divisions ==
=== Eerste Klasse East ===
Pos	Team	Pld	W	D	L	GF	GA	GD	Pts	Qualification
1	RKVV Wilhelmina	12	8	1	3	29	22	+7	17	Qualified for Championship play-off
2	Vitesse Arnhem	12	7	2	3	41	13	+28	16	
3	U.D.	12	6	3	3	23	15	+8	15	
4	Bredania/'t Zesde	12	7	1	4	23	20	+3	15	
5	GVC	12	4	2	6	15	34	−19	10	
6	EFC PW 1885	12	4	1	7	27	28	−1	9	
7	AFC Quick 1890	12	1	0	11	7	33	−26	2	Not participating next season

Source: rsssf.com

=== Eerste Klasse West ===
Pos	Team	Pld	W	D	L	GF	GA	GD	Pts	Qualification
1	Sparta Rotterdam	18	13	3	2	61	15	+46	29	Qualified for Championship play-off
2	HVV Den Haag	18	13	3	2	60	21	+39	29	
3	HV & CV Quick	18	11	2	5	54	21	+33	24	
4	DFC	18	7	5	6	41	36	+5	19	
5	CVV Velocitas	17	8	3	6	42	37	+5	19	
6	HBS Craeyenhout	18	8	1	9	38	45	−7	17	
7	Koninklijke HFC	18	6	2	10	32	49	−17	14	
8	HFC Haarlem	18	5	4	9	27	46	−19	14	
9	USV Hercules	18	5	1	12	20	70	−50	11	
10	Ajax Sportman Combinatie	18	1	2	15	18	53	−35	4	

Source: rsssf.com

=== Championship play-off ===
Team 1	Agg.	Team 2	1st leg	2nd leg
RKVV Wilhelmina	3–10	Sparta Rotterdam	2–6	1–4

Sparta Rotterdam won the championship.
