= Bertus de Harder =

Dutch footballer and manager

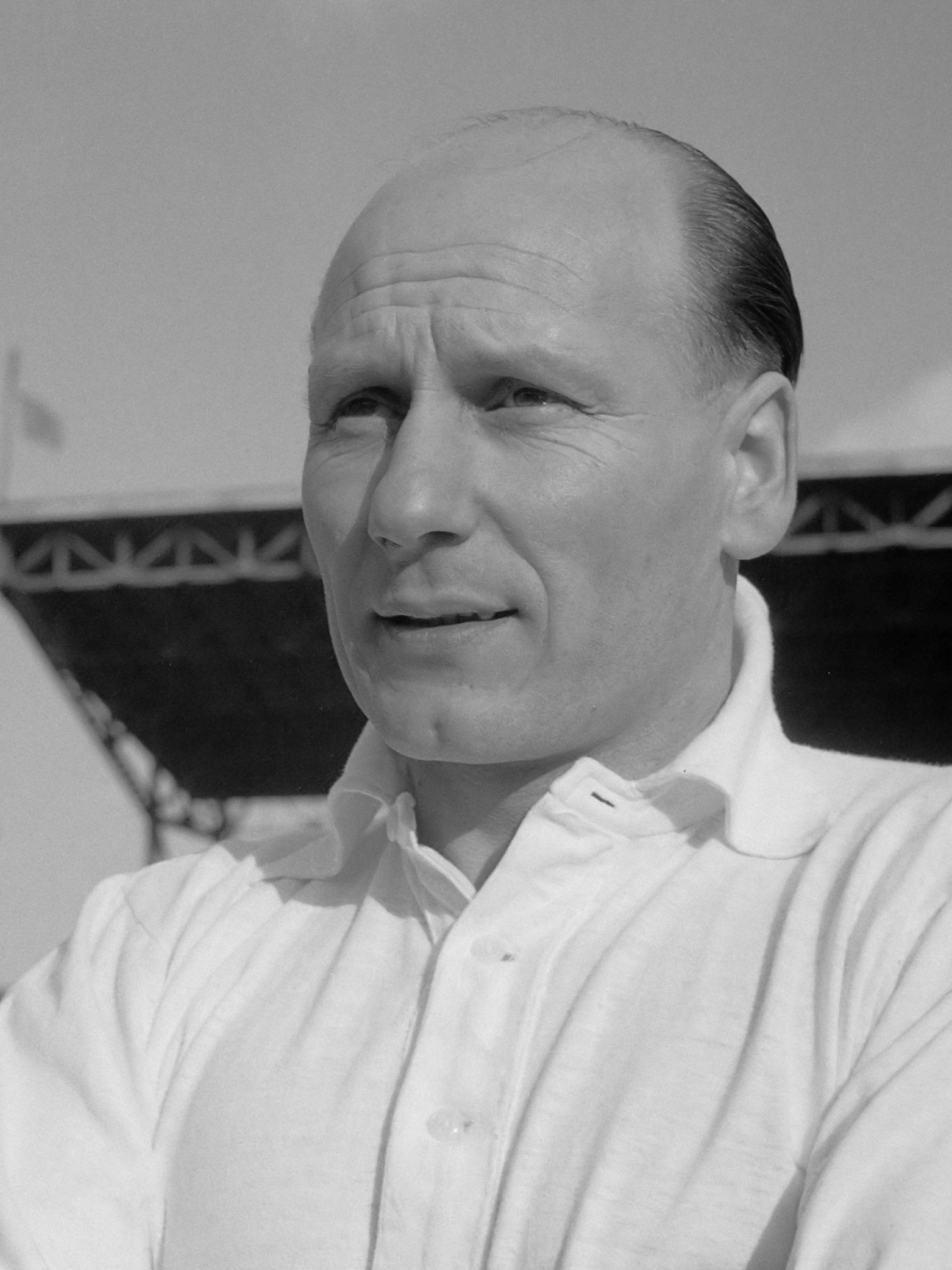
- De Harder in 1955

Personal information
- Full name: Johannes Lambertus de Harder
- Date of birth: 14 January 1920
- Place of birth: The Hague, Netherlands
- Date of death: 7 December 1982 (aged 62)
- Place of death: Jeumont, France
- Height: 1.73 m (5 ft 8 in)
- Position: Striker

Youth career
- 1930-: Transvaal
- Triomph

Senior career*
Years	Team	Apps	(Gls)
1937–1949	VUC		
1949–1954	Bordeaux	143	(72)
1954–1956	Holland Sport	30	(16)
1949–1954	Bordeaux	53	(9)
1957–1958	Angoulême		

International career
1938–1955	Netherlands	12	(3)

Managerial career
- 1957–1960: Angoulême
- 1962–1964: Mulhouse
- * Club domestic league appearances and goals

Johannes Lambertus (Bertus) de Harder (14 January 1920 – 7 December 1982) was a Dutch footballer who played as a striker. He scored 3 goals in 12 games for the Netherlands national team. He represented the Netherlands at the 1938 FIFA World Cup.

Regarded by some as one of the Netherlands' best ever football player, De Harder's career started at hometown clubs Transvaal, Triomph and VUC for whom he played during World War II. Rumours say he was bribed for a bag of potatoes or flour and VUC subsequently lost the title deciding match for the 1944 league title away against De Volewijckers. VUC suspended De Harder as a result for two and a half years.

Nicknamed Goddelijke Kale (divine bald) or the Schilderswijk's Brazilian, he was one of the first Dutch players that went professional in France and played for FC Girondins de Bordeaux in France where he later became a manager with AS Angoulême and FC Mulhouse.
