= 1901–02 Netherlands Football League Championship =

Netherl. Football Championship
- Season: 1901–1902
- Champions: HVV Den Haag (5th title)

The Netherlands Football League Championship 1901–1902 was contested by fifteen teams participating in two divisions. The national champion would be determined by a play-off featuring the winners of the eastern and western football division of the Netherlands. HVV Den Haag won this year's championship by beating Victoria Wageningen 2-2, 3–1.

== New entrant ==
Eerste Klasse West:

- Koninklijke HFC returned after one season of absence

== Divisions ==
=== Eerste Klasse East ===
Pos	Team	Pld	W	D	L	GF	GA	GD	Pts	Qualification
1	Victoria Wageningen	12	7	3	2	34	12	+22	17	Qualified for Championship play-off
2	Hercules	12	5	5	2	27	21	+6	15	Moved to new Division West-B
3	Quick Nijmegen	12	6	1	5	27	18	+9	13	
4	Go Ahead Wageningen	12	5	3	4	24	24	0	13	
5	Vitesse Arnhem	12	4	2	6	24	30	−6	10	
6	U.D.	12	4	2	6	14	20	−6	10	
7	PW	12	2	2	8	14	39	−25	6	

Source: rsssf.com

=== Eerste Klasse West ===
Pos	Team	Pld	W	D	L	GF	GA	GD	Pts	Qualification
1	HVV Den Haag	14	12	0	2	54	16	+38	24	Qualified for Championship play-off
2	HBS Craeyenhout	14	11	2	1	37	15	+22	24	Moved to new Division West-B
3	Velocitas	14	7	1	6	27	20	+7	15	
4	Rapiditas Rotterdam	14	5	1	8	21	43	−22	11	Moved to new Division West-B
5	RAP	14	5	1	8	28	33	−5	11	
6	HFC Haarlem	14	4	1	9	25	37	−12	9	
7	Koninklijke HFC	14	4	1	9	25	38	−13	9	Moved to new Division West-B
8	Ajax Sportman Combinatie	14	4	1	9	24	39	−15	9	

Source: rsssf.com

=== Championship play-off ===
Team 1	Agg.	Team 2	1st leg	2nd leg
HVV Den Haag	5–3	Victoria Wageningen	2–2	3–1

HVV Den Haag won the championship.
