= 1902–03 Netherlands Football League Championship =

Netherl. Football Championship
- Season: 1902–1903
- Champions: HVV Den Haag (6th title)

The Netherlands Football League Championship 1902–1903 was contested by eighteen teams participating in three divisions. This season, the western division had been split in two, creating the Eerste Klasse West-A and the Eerste Klasse West-B. The national champion would be determined by a play-off featuring the winners of the three divisions of the Netherlands. HVV Den Haag won this year's championship by beating Vitesse Arnhem and Volharding.

== New entrants ==
Eerste Klasse West-A:

- Sparta Rotterdam returned after one year of absence

Eerste Klasse West-B: (new division)
Moved from Division East:

- Hercules

Moved from Division West-A:

- HBS Creayenhout
- Rapiditas Rotterdam
- Koninklijke HFC

New:

- Quick 1890
- Volharding

== Divisions ==
=== Eerste Klasse East ===
Pos	Team	Pld	W	D	L	GF	GA	GD	Pts	Qualification
1	Vitesse	10	9	0	1	42	13	+29	18	Qualified for Championship play-off
2	PW	10	6	1	3	45	20	+25	13	
3	Go Ahead Wageningen	10	5	1	4	31	27	+4	11	Merged to form GVC Wageningen
4	Quick Nijmegen	10	3	2	5	20	29	−9	8	
5	U.D.	10	3	1	6	23	37	−14	7	
6	Victoria Wageningen	10	1	1	8	12	47	−35	3	Merged to form GVC Wageningen

Source: rsssf.com

=== Eerste Klasse West-A ===
Pos	Team	Pld	W	D	L	GF	GA	GD	Pts	Qualification
1	HVV Den Haag	10	5	4	1	27	10	+17	14	Qualified for Championship play-off Moved to Division West-B
2	Sparta Rotterdam	10	4	4	2	18	11	+7	12	
3	Ajax Sportman Combinatie	10	4	3	3	23	20	+3	11	
4	Velocitas	10	5	1	4	21	19	+2	11	Moved to Division West-B
5	HFC Haarlem	10	1	6	3	19	27	−8	8	Moved to Division West-B
6	RAP	10	1	2	7	12	33	−21	4	

Source: rsssf.com

=== Eerste Klasse West-B ===
Pos	Team	Pld	W	D	L	GF	GA	GD	Pts	Qualification
1	Volharding	10	9	1	0	29	12	+17	19	Qualified for Championship play-off
2	HBS Craeyenhout	10	6	1	3	22	20	+2	13	Moved to Division West-A
3	Koninklijke HFC	10	4	1	5	20	16	+4	9	Moved to Division West-A
4	Hercules	10	4	1	5	24	21	+3	9	
5	Rapiditas Rotterdam	10	4	1	5	20	27	−7	9	
6	Quick 1890	10	0	1	9	13	32	−19	1	Moved to Division West-A

Source: rsssf.com

=== Championship play-off ===
Pos	Team	Pld	W	D	L	GF	GA	GD	Pts	HVV	VIT	VOL
1	HVV Den Haag	4	4	0	0	11	2	+9	8		1–0	5–0
2	Vitesse	4	1	0	3	6	10	−4	2	1–3		4–2
3	Volharding	4	1	0	3	7	12	−5	2	1–2	4–1	

Source: rsssf.com
