= 1937–38 Netherlands Football League Championship =

Play season of a football competition

Netherl. Football Championship
- Season: 1937–1938
- Champions: Feijenoord (4th title)

The Netherlands Football League Championship 1937–1938 was contested by 51 teams participating in five divisions. The national champion would be determined by a play-off featuring the winners of the eastern, northern, southern and two western football divisions of the Netherlands. Feijenoord won this year's championship by beating Heracles, DWS, Be Quick 1887 and PSV Eindhoven.

== New entrants ==
Eerste Klasse East:

- Promoted from 2nd Division: HVV Hengelo

Eerste Klasse North:

- Promoted from 2nd Division: sc Heerenveen

Eerste Klasse South:

- Promoted from 2nd Division: Willem II

Eerste Klasse West-I:

- Moving in from West-II: DWS, KFC, Sparta Rotterdam VSV and VUC
- Promoted from 2nd Division: RFC Rotterdam

Eerste Klasse West-II:

- Moving in from West-I: Blauw-Wit Amsterdam, CVV Mercurius, DHC Delft, Stormvogels and Xerxes
- Promoted from 2nd Division: HVV 't Gooi

== Divisions ==
=== Eerste Klasse East ===
Pos	Team	Pld	W	D	L	GF	GA	GD	Pts	Qualification or relegation
1	Heracles	18	12	2	4	44	20	+24	26	Qualified for Championship play-off
2	Go Ahead	18	10	4	4	42	28	+14	24	
3	HVV Tubantia	18	10	4	4	40	31	+9	24	
4	SC Enschede	18	8	5	5	43	31	+12	21	
5	AGOVV Apeldoorn	18	7	6	5	31	24	+7	20	
6	FC Wageningen	18	7	4	7	42	38	+4	18	
7	ZAC	18	7	1	10	27	36	−9	15	
8	NEC Nijmegen	18	5	2	11	29	45	−16	12	
9	HVV Hengelo	18	2	7	9	23	43	−20	11	
10	PEC Zwolle	18	3	3	12	20	45	−25	9	Relegated to 2nd Division

Source: rsssf.com

=== Eerste Klasse North ===
Pos	Team	Pld	W	D	L	GF	GA	GD	Pts	Qualification or relegation
1	Be Quick 1887	18	12	3	3	51	24	+27	27	Qualified for Championship play-off
2	GVAV Rapiditas	18	10	6	2	56	23	+33	26	
3	Veendam	18	9	4	5	46	25	+21	22	
4	Achilles 1894	18	7	5	6	41	38	+3	19	
5	HSC	18	9	0	9	33	47	−14	18	
6	VV Leeuwarden	18	5	7	6	40	37	+3	17	
7	Velocitas 1897	18	6	4	8	22	26	−4	16	
8	Sneek Wit Zwart	18	6	3	9	23	43	−20	15	
9	sc Heerenveen	18	4	4	10	34	58	−24	12	
10	VV Hoogezand	18	3	2	13	21	46	−25	8	Relegated to 2nd Division

Source: rsssf.com

=== Eerste Klasse South ===
Pos	Team	Pld	W	D	L	GF	GA	GD	Pts	Qualification
1	PSV Eindhoven	20	13	3	4	59	25	+34	29	Qualified for Championship play-off
2	NAC	20	12	3	5	49	29	+20	27	
3	Juliana	20	11	3	6	47	41	+6	25	
4	BVV Den Bosch	20	10	3	7	50	42	+8	23	
5	LONGA	20	9	5	6	35	32	+3	23	
6	FC Eindhoven	20	8	4	8	43	37	+6	20	
7	RFC Roermond	20	8	2	10	41	45	−4	18	
8	Willem II	20	7	3	10	37	50	−13	17	
9	MVV Maastricht	20	6	4	10	37	56	−19	16	
10	NOAD	20	6	1	13	39	57	−18	13	
11	Bleijerheide	20	3	3	14	28	51	−23	9	

Source: rsssf.com

=== Eerste Klasse West-I ===
Pos	Team	Pld	W	D	L	GF	GA	GD	Pts	Qualification or relegation
1	DWS	18	13	2	3	44	23	+21	28	Qualified for Championship play-off
2	AFC Ajax	18	12	3	3	62	20	+42	27	Division West-II next season
3	KFC	18	7	4	7	31	29	+2	18	
4	RFC Rotterdam	18	9	0	9	48	48	0	18	Division West-II next season
5	ADO Den Haag	18	7	4	7	32	37	−5	18	
6	VSV	18	7	3	8	56	56	0	17	Division West-II next season
7	VUC	18	6	4	8	45	39	+6	16	Division West-II next season
8	DFC	18	6	4	8	25	45	−20	16	Division West-II next season
9	Sparta Rotterdam	18	4	4	10	24	32	−8	12	
10	SBV Excelsior	18	3	4	11	17	55	−38	10	Relegated to 2nd Division

Source: rsssf.com

=== Eerste Klasse West-II ===
Pos	Team	Pld	W	D	L	GF	GA	GD	Pts	Qualification
1	Feijenoord	18	13	1	4	50	20	+30	27	Qualified for Championship play-off
2	HFC Haarlem	18	12	2	4	52	37	+15	26	
3	Xerxes	18	8	4	6	63	39	+24	20	Division West-I next season
4	Blauw-Wit Amsterdam	18	9	2	7	44	40	+4	20	Division West-I next season
5	CVV Mercurius	18	8	3	7	32	27	+5	19	
6	HVV 't Gooi	18	8	3	7	32	34	−2	19	Division West-I next season
7	Stormvogels	18	8	2	8	37	43	−6	18	Division West-I next season
8	HBS Craeyenhout	18	5	4	9	42	53	−11	14	Division West-I next season
9	DHC Delft	18	2	5	11	34	67	−33	9	
10	Hermes DVS	18	3	2	13	31	57	−26	8	Division West-I next season

Source: rsssf.com

=== Championship play-off ===
Pos	Team	Pld	W	D	L	GF	GA	GD	Pts	FEY	HER	DWS	BEQ	PSV
1	Feijenoord	8	6	2	0	20	7	+13	14		4–1	0–0	3–1	4–0
2	Heracles	8	6	0	2	21	11	+10	12	0–2		2–1	2–0	2–1
3	DWS	8	2	3	3	11	9	+2	7	1–2	0–2		0–0	2–1
4	Be Quick 1887	8	2	1	5	13	21	−8	5	2–3	2–5	1–6		2–0
5	PSV Eindhoven	8	0	2	6	8	25	−17	2	2–2	1–7	1–1	2–5	

Source: rsssf.com
