= 1942–43 Netherlands Football League Championship =

Netherl. Football Championship
- Season: 1942–1943
- Champions: ADO (2nd title)

The Netherlands Football League Championship 1942–1943 was contested by 52 teams participating in five divisions. The national champion would be determined by a play-off featuring the winners of the eastern, northern, southern and two western football divisions of the Netherlands. ADO won this year's championship by beating Feijenoord, Willem II, SC Enschede and Heerenveen.

== New entrants ==
Eerste Klasse East:

- Promoted from 2nd Division: Go Ahead

Eerste Klasse South:

- Promoted from 2nd Division: Maurits

Eerste Klasse West-I:

- Moving in from West-II: HBS Craeyenhout, Hermes DVS and Sparta Rotterdam
- Promoted from 2nd Division: De Volewijckers

Eerste Klasse West-II:

- Moving in from West-I: AFC Ajax, Feijenoord and VUC

== Divisions ==
=== Eerste Klasse East ===
Pos	Team	Pld	W	D	L	GF	GA	GD	Pts	Qualification
1	SC Enschede	18	12	5	1	36	9	+27	29	Qualified for Championship play-off
2	AGOVV Apeldoorn	18	10	3	5	43	30	+13	23	
3	Go Ahead	18	9	3	6	45	38	+7	21	
4	NEC Nijmegen	18	9	2	7	32	28	+4	20	
5	FC Wageningen	18	8	4	6	35	39	−4	20	
6	Quick Nijmegen	18	7	5	6	44	36	+8	19	
7	Heracles	18	5	6	7	37	35	+2	16	
8	Enschedese Boys	18	4	4	10	26	40	−14	12	
9	HVV Tubantia	18	6	0	12	31	54	−23	12	
10	PEC Zwolle	18	3	2	13	33	53	−20	8	

Source: rsssf.com

=== Eerste Klasse North ===
Pos	Team	Pld	W	D	L	GF	GA	GD	Pts	Qualification
1	sc Heerenveen	18	15	2	1	63	22	+41	32	Qualified for Championship play-off
2	Be Quick 1887	18	9	4	5	50	35	+15	22	
3	Achilles 1894	18	9	4	5	36	31	+5	22	
4	GVAV Rapiditas	18	8	5	5	50	29	+21	21	
5	Veendam	18	7	4	7	34	37	−3	18	
6	Velocitas 1897	18	7	4	7	40	45	−5	18	
7	LSC Sneek	18	6	4	8	33	40	−7	16	
8	HSC	18	4	6	8	45	48	−3	14	
9	VV Leeuwarden	18	5	3	10	33	52	−19	13	
10	Sneek Wit Zwart	18	2	3	13	21	66	−45	7	

Source: rsssf.com

=== Eerste Klasse South ===
Pos	Team	Pld	W	D	L	GF	GA	GD	Pts	Qualification
1	Willem II	22	14	4	4	50	28	+22	32	Qualified for Championship play-off
2	LONGA	22	13	3	6	59	40	+19	29	
3	BVV Den Bosch	22	10	5	7	52	29	+23	25	
4	Spekholzerheide	22	10	4	8	52	47	+5	24	
5	NAC	22	7	9	6	44	30	+14	23	
6	FC Eindhoven	22	10	3	9	39	41	−2	23	
7	Maurits	22	9	3	10	56	60	−4	21	
8	Picus	22	8	4	10	40	59	−19	20	Changed name to De Spechten.
9	PSV Eindhoven	22	7	5	10	31	36	−5	19	
10	MVV Maastricht	21	6	5	10	40	50	−10	17	
11	RFC Roermond	21	6	3	12	35	51	−16	15	
12	NOAD	22	6	2	14	39	66	−27	14	

Source: rsssf.com

=== Eerste Klasse West-I ===
Pos	Team	Pld	W	D	L	GF	GA	GD	Pts	Qualification
1	ADO Den Haag	19	10	6	3	41	32	+9	26	Qualified for Championship play-off
2	Hermes DVS	19	11	2	6	45	29	+16	24	
3	HFC EDO	18	9	4	5	27	28	−1	22	
4	DFC	18	8	4	6	46	38	+8	20	
5	DWS	18	7	5	6	32	33	−1	19	
6	Sparta Rotterdam	18	7	4	7	41	46	−5	18	
7	De Volewijckers	18	6	3	9	36	39	−3	15	
8	HBS Craeyenhout	18	6	2	10	36	43	−7	14	
9	Xerxes	18	5	2	11	42	45	−3	12	
10	Stormvogels	18	4	4	10	20	33	−13	12	

Source: rsssf.com

=== Eerste Klasse West-II ===
Pos	Team	Pld	W	D	L	GF	GA	GD	Pts	Qualification
1	Feijenoord	18	14	3	1	48	19	+29	31	Qualified for Championship play-off
2	VSV	18	11	3	4	60	30	+30	25	
3	Blauw-Wit Amsterdam	18	11	2	5	40	31	+9	24	
4	DHC Delft	18	10	2	6	46	36	+10	22	
5	VUC	18	8	3	7	51	50	+1	19	
6	AFC Ajax	18	6	4	8	39	39	0	16	
7	RFC Rotterdam	18	7	2	9	36	41	−5	16	
8	HFC Haarlem	18	4	2	12	41	54	−13	10	
9	SC Emma	18	4	2	12	26	59	−33	10	
10	HVV't Gooi	18	2	3	13	26	54	−28	7	

Source: rsssf.com

== Championship play-off ==
Pos	Team	Pld	W	D	L	GF	GA	GD	Pts	ADO	FEY	WIL	ENS	HEE
1	ADO Den Haag	8	4	3	1	19	11	+8	11		1–1	1–4	1–0	8–2
2	Feijenoord	8	3	3	2	9	9	0	9 (Note: Owing to the war, Feijenoord were forced to play their home games on neutral grounds.)	1–3		1–0	0–1	2–1
3	Willem II	8	3	2	3	17	19	−2	8	1–1	2–2		3–2	2–6
4	SC Enschede	8	3	1	4	15	13	+2	7	1–3	0–0	2–3		4–2
5	sc Heerenveen	8	2	1	5	18	26	−8	5	1–1	1–2	4–2	1–5	

Source: rsssf.com
