= 1935–36 Netherlands Football League Championship =

Netherl. Football Championship
- Season: 1935–1936
- Champions: Feijenoord (3rd title)

The Netherlands Football League Championship 1935–1936 was contested by 50 teams participating in five divisions. The national champion would be determined by a play-off featuring the winners of the eastern, northern, southern and two western football divisions of the Netherlands. Feijenoord won this year's championship by beating AFC Ajax, SC Enschede, Be Quick 1887 and NAC.

== New entrants ==
Eerste Klasse East:

- Promoted from 2nd Division: VV SCH

Eerste Klasse North:

- Promoted from 2nd Division: VV Hoogezand

Eerste Klasse South:

- Promoted from 2nd Division: RFC Roermond

Eerste Klasse West-I:

- Moving in from West-II: HFC Haarlem, HBS Craeyenhout, Hermes DVS, KFC and Sparta Rotterdam

Eerste Klasse West-II:

- Moving in from West-I: DHC Delft, Feijenoord, Koninklijke HFC and VUC
- Promoted from 2nd Division: Blauw-Wit Amsterdam

== Divisions ==
=== Eerste Klasse East ===
Pos	Team	Pld	W	D	L	GF	GA	GD	Pts	Qualification or relegation
1	SC Enschede	18	15	1	2	55	24	+31	31	Qualified for Championship play-off
2	Go Ahead	18	12	3	3	48	20	+28	27	
3	Heracles	18	11	3	4	36	20	+16	25	
4	PEC Zwolle	18	8	4	6	40	30	+10	20	
5	AGOVV Apeldoorn	18	8	2	8	41	37	+4	18	
6	ZAC	18	7	3	8	34	47	−13	17	
7	FC Wageningen	18	5	4	9	22	37	−15	14	
8	HVV Tubantia	18	3	5	10	27	40	−13	11	
9	Enschedese Boys	18	4	3	11	28	51	−23	11	
10	VV SCH	18	2	2	14	29	54	−25	6	Relegated to 2nd Division

Source: rsssf.com

=== Eerste Klasse North ===
Pos	Team	Pld	W	D	L	GF	GA	GD	Pts	Qualification
1	Be Quick 1887	18	16	1	1	71	17	+54	33	Qualified for Championship play-off
2	Veendam	18	12	2	4	51	35	+16	26	
3	Velocitas	18	10	4	4	48	21	+27	24	
4	GVAV Rapiditas	18	7	3	8	48	38	+10	17	
5	VV Hoogezand	18	7	2	9	38	39	−1	16	
6	VV Leeuwarden	18	8	0	10	40	44	−4	16	
7	HSC	18	6	2	10	37	58	−21	14	
8	LVV Friesland	18	5	2	11	34	56	−22	12	
9	Sneek Wit Zwart	18	6	0	12	24	59	−35	12	
10	Achilles 1894	18	3	4	11	27	51	−24	10	

Source: rsssf.com

=== Eerste Klasse South ===
Pos	Team	Pld	W	D	L	GF	GA	GD	Pts	Qualification
1	NAC	18	9	7	2	41	21	+20	25	Qualified for Championship play-off
2	BVV Den Bosch	18	9	6	3	38	32	+6	24	
3	MVV Maastricht	18	8	5	5	41	31	+10	21	
4	LONGA	18	6	7	5	35	27	+8	19	
5	PSV Eindhoven	18	6	7	5	35	31	+4	19	
6	Juliana	18	7	5	6	37	34	+3	19	
7	Bleijerheide	18	5	6	7	28	33	−5	16	
8	RFC Roermond	18	6	3	9	24	37	−13	15	
9	FC Eindhoven	18	5	3	10	33	45	−12	13	
10	NOAD	18	3	3	12	29	50	−21	9	

Source: rsssf.com

=== Eerste Klasse West-I ===
Pos	Team	Pld	W	D	L	GF	GA	GD	Pts	Qualification
1	AFC Ajax	18	11	3	4	58	33	+25	25	Qualified for Championship play-off
2	HBS Craeyenhout	18	10	2	6	50	37	+13	22	Division West-II next season
3	Sparta Rotterdam	18	8	5	5	49	43	+6	21	Division West-II next season
4	VSV	18	9	3	6	43	40	+3	21	Division West-II next season
5	ADO Den Haag	18	10	0	8	41	39	+2	20	
6	HFC Haarlem	18	6	4	8	47	46	+1	16	Division West-II next season
7	RCH	18	5	5	8	35	45	−10	15	
8	KFC	18	5	4	9	22	34	−12	14	Division West-II next season
9	Xerxes	18	4	5	9	42	55	−13	13	
10	Hermes DVS	18	4	5	9	28	43	−15	13	Division West-II next season

Source: rsssf.com

=== Eerste Klasse West-II ===
Pos	Team	Pld	W	D	L	GF	GA	GD	Pts	Qualification or relegation
1	Feijenoord	18	13	3	2	59	19	+40	29	Qualified for Championship play-off
2	Blauw-Wit Amsterdam	18	13	2	3	43	15	+28	28	Division West-I next season
3	DWS	18	8	4	6	42	35	+7	20	
4	Stormvogels	18	8	3	7	41	29	+12	19	Division West-I next season
5	DFC	18	7	4	7	34	39	−5	18	Division West-I next season
6	DHC Delft	18	7	3	8	51	43	+8	17	Division West-I next season
7	ZFC	18	4	7	7	24	37	−13	15	
8	Excelsior	18	5	4	9	30	48	−18	14	Division West-I next season
9	VUC	18	3	4	11	30	56	−26	10	
10	Koninklijke HFC	18	3	4	11	23	56	−33	10	Relegated to 2nd Division

Source: rsssf.com

=== Championship play-off ===
Pos	Team	Pld	W	D	L	GF	GA	GD	Pts	FEY	AJA	ENS	BEQ	NAC
1	Feijenoord	8	6	0	2	25	16	+9	12		3–6	4–1	3–2	3–0
2	AFC Ajax	8	5	0	3	24	19	+5	10	1–4		4–3	3–1	3–0
3	SC Enschede	8	5	0	3	22	20	+2	10	1–3	2–1		3–2	3–2
4	Be Quick 1887	8	2	0	6	18	26	−8	4	4–2	5–4	3–6		1–2
5	NAC	8	2	0	6	10	18	−8	4	1–3	1–2	1–3	3–0	

Source: rsssf.com
