= 1936–37 Netherlands Football League Championship =

Netherl. Football Championship
- Season: 1936–1937
- Champions: AFC Ajax (6th title)

The Netherlands Football League Championship 1936–1937 was contested by 50 teams participating in five divisions. The national champion would be determined by a play-off featuring the winners of the eastern, northern, southern and two western football divisions of the Netherlands. AFC Ajax won this year's championship by beating Feijenoord, PSV Eindhoven, Be Quick 1887 and Go Ahead.

== New entrants ==
Eerste Klasse East:

- Promoted from 2nd Division: NEC Nijmegen

Eerste Klasse West-I:

- Moving in from West-II: DHC Delft, DFC, SBV Excelsior, Sparta Rotterdam and Stormvogels
- Promoted from 2nd Division: CVV Mercurius

Eerste Klasse West-II:

- Moving in from West-I: HFC Haarlem, HBS Craeyenhout, Hermes DVS, KFC, Sparta Rotterdam and VSV

== Divisions ==
=== Eerste Klasse East ===
Pos	Team	Pld	W	D	L	GF	GA	GD	Pts	Qualification or relegation
1	Go Ahead	18	14	2	2	44	21	+23	30	Qualified for Championship play-off
2	Heracles	18	11	4	3	47	21	+26	26	
3	AGOVV Apeldoorn	18	10	3	5	36	22	+14	23	
4	SC Enschede	18	7	3	8	39	38	+1	17	
5	HVV Tubantia	18	7	3	8	36	42	−6	17	
6	FC Wageningen	18	6	4	8	34	35	−1	16	
7	PEC Zwolle	18	7	1	10	40	41	−1	15	
8	ZAC	18	7	1	10	44	56	−12	15	
9	NEC Nijmegen	18	5	4	9	27	37	−10	14	
10	Enschedese Boys	18	3	1	14	25	59	−34	7	Relegated to 2nd Division

Source: rsssf.com

=== Eerste Klasse North ===
Pos	Team	Pld	W	D	L	GF	GA	GD	Pts	Qualification or relegation
1	Be Quick 1887	18	16	2	0	75	24	+51	34	Qualified for Championship play-off
2	GVAV Rapiditas	18	11	3	4	43	20	+23	25	
3	Veendam	18	11	2	5	50	25	+25	24	
4	Velocitas 1897	18	8	3	7	35	33	+2	19	
5	HSC	18	8	1	9	35	42	−7	17	
6	Sneek Wit Zwart	18	6	2	10	24	37	−13	14	
7	Achilles 1894	18	5	3	10	48	51	−3	13	
8	VV Hoogezand	18	5	3	10	34	41	−7	13	
9	VV Leeuwarden	18	4	4	10	21	44	−23	12	
10	LVV Friesland	18	4	1	13	29	77	−48	9	Relegated to 2nd Division

Source: rsssf.com

=== Eerste Klasse South ===
Pos	Team	Pld	W	D	L	GF	GA	GD	Pts	Qualification
1	PSV Eindhoven	18	10	5	3	47	29	+18	25	Qualified for Championship play-off
2	BVV Den Bosch	18	9	3	6	55	42	+13	21	
3	NOAD	18	8	4	6	54	38	+16	20	
4	NAC	18	9	2	7	44	34	+10	20	
5	LONGA	18	7	2	9	41	38	+3	16	
6	Juliana	18	5	6	7	37	45	−8	16	
7	RFC Roermond	18	6	4	8	36	49	−13	16	
8	Bleijerheide	18	5	6	7	31	50	−19	16	
9	FC Eindhoven	18	6	3	9	38	51	−13	15	
10	MVV Maastricht	18	6	3	9	38	45	−7	15	

Source: rsssf.com

=== Eerste Klasse West-I ===
Pos	Team	Pld	W	D	L	GF	GA	GD	Pts	Qualification or relegation
1	AFC Ajax	18	14	2	2	47	18	+29	30	Qualified for Championship play-off
2	Xerxes	18	9	3	6	59	35	+24	21	Division West-II next season
3	Blauw-Wit Amsterdam	18	8	5	5	30	22	+8	21	Division West-II next season
4	Stormvogels	18	8	2	8	32	26	+6	18	Division West-II next season
5	DFC	18	7	4	7	38	43	−5	18	
6	DHC Delft	18	7	3	8	39	48	−9	17	Division West-II next season
7	SBV Excelsior	18	7	2	9	41	42	−1	16	
8	CVV Mercurius	18	6	4	8	25	40	−15	16	Division West-II next season
9	ADO Den Haag	18	5	4	9	20	30	−10	14	
10	RCH	18	2	5	11	18	45	−27	9	Relegated to 2nd Division

Source: rsssf.com

=== Eerste Klasse West-II ===
Pos	Team	Pld	W	D	L	GF	GA	GD	Pts	Qualification or relegation
1	Feijenoord	18	15	1	2	66	23	+43	31	Qualified for Championship play-off
2	DWS	18	14	1	3	41	22	+19	29	Division West-I next season
3	HFC Haarlem	18	7	4	7	48	47	+1	18	
4	VSV	18	8	2	8	37	41	−4	18	Division West-I next season
5	Sparta Rotterdam	18	7	2	9	38	37	+1	16	Division West-I next season
6	KFC	18	5	6	7	38	44	−6	16	Division West-I next season
7	HBS Craeyenhout	18	5	5	8	34	46	−12	15	
8	Hermes DVS	18	5	4	9	27	41	−14	14	
9	VUC	18	5	3	10	26	43	−17	13	Division West-I next season
10	ZFC	18	3	4	11	19	30	−11	10	Relegated to 2nd Division

Source: rsssf.com

=== Championship play-off ===
Pos	Team	Pld	W	D	L	GF	GA	GD	Pts	AJA	FEY	PSV	BEQ	GOA
1	AFC Ajax	8	7	0	1	20	10	+10	14		2–0	5–2	2–1	2–1
2	Feijenoord	8	5	0	3	21	9	+12	10	3–0		6–1	6–0	2–0
3	PSV Eindhoven	8	3	0	5	15	22	−7	6	2–3	1–2		4–0	2–1
4	Be Quick 1887	8	3	0	5	12	21	−9	6	1–3	3–2	2–3		3–0
5	Go Ahead	8	2	0	6	8	14	−6	4	0–3	2–0	3–0	1–2	

Source: rsssf.com
