= 1907–08 Netherlands Football League Championship =

Netherl. Football Championship
- Season: 1907–1908
- Champions: Quick (1st title)

The Netherlands Football League Championship 1907–1908 was contested by seventeen teams participating in two divisions. The national champion would be determined by a play-off featuring the winners of the eastern and western football division of the Netherlands. HV & CV Quick won this year's championship by beating U.D. 4–1 in a decision match.

== Divisions ==
=== Eerste Klasse East ===
Pos	Team	Pld	W	D	L	GF	GA	GD	Pts	Qualification
1	U.D.	12	9	2	1	44	15	+29	20	Qualified for Championship play-off
2	EFC PW 1885	12	6	3	3	39	24	+15	15	
3	GVC Wageningen	12	7	1	4	32	24	+8	15	
4	AFC Quick 1890	12	5	0	7	20	27	−7	10	
5	Vitesse Arnhem	12	5	0	7	21	33	−12	10	
6	RKVV Wilhelmina	12	4	1	7	27	38	−11	9	
7	Quick Nijmegen	12	2	1	9	11	33	−22	5	Not participating next season

Source: rsssf.com

=== Eerste Klasse West ===
Pos	Team	Pld	W	D	L	GF	GA	GD	Pts	Qualification
1	HV & CV Quick	18	14	1	3	58	28	+30	29	Qualified for Championship play-off
2	HVV Den Haag	18	11	2	5	43	30	+13	24	
3	Sparta Rotterdam	18	8	4	6	49	41	+8	20	
4	HFC Haarlem	18	9	1	8	44	42	+2	19	
5	DFC	18	8	3	7	38	42	−4	19	
6	HBS Craeyenhout	18	7	3	8	32	33	−1	17	
7	Ajax Sportsman Combinatie	18	6	4	8	42	46	−4	16	
8	CVV Velocitas	18	6	2	10	45	52	−7	14	
9	Koninklijke HFC	18	5	3	10	40	59	−19	13	
10	USV Hercules	18	2	5	11	27	45	−18	9	

Source: rsssf.com

=== Championship play-off ===
Team 1	Agg.	Team 2	1st leg	2nd leg
U.D.	one win each	HV & CV Quick	1–1	3–3

=== Replay ===
Team 1	Score	Team 2
U.D.	1–4	HV & CV Quick

HV & CV Quick won the championship.
