= 1941–42 Netherlands Football League Championship =

Netherl. Football Championship
- Season: 1941–1942
- Champions: ADO Den Haag (1st title)

The Netherlands Football League Championship 1941–1942 was contested by 52 teams participating in five divisions. The national champion would be determined by a play-off featuring the winners of the eastern, northern, southern and two western football divisions of the Netherlands. ADO Den Haag won this year's championship by beating FC Eindhoven, AGOVV Apeldoorn, Blauw-Wit Amsterdam and sc Heerenveen.

== New entrants ==
Eerste Klasse East:

- Promoted from 2nd Division: PEC Zwolle

Eerste Klasse North:

- Promoted from 2nd Division: LSC Sneek

Eerste Klasse South:

- Promoted from 2nd Division: Picus
- Last years competitors Juliana were forced to change their name to Spekholzerheide

Eerste Klasse West-I:

- Moving in from West-II: ADO Den Haag, DFC, DWS, Feijenoord and Stormvogels
- Promoted from 2nd Division: HFC EDO

Eerste Klasse West-II:

- Moving in from West-I: Blauw-Wit Amsterdam, HFC Haarlem, HBS Craeyenhout, RFC Rotterdam and VSV
- Promoted from 2nd Division: SC Emma

== Divisions ==
=== Eerste Klasse East ===
Pos	Team	Pld	W	D	L	GF	GA	GD	Pts	Qualification or relegation
1	AGOVV Apeldoorn	19	12	2	5	43	22	+21	26	Play-off as level on points
2	Quick Nijmegen	19	12	2	5	43	23	+20	26	Play-off as level on points
3	FC Wageningen	18	11	2	5	35	22	+13	24	
4	SC Enschede	18	9	2	7	41	36	+5	20	
5	Heracles	18	8	2	8	34	24	+10	18	
6	HVV Tubantia	18	6	2	10	30	39	−9	14	
7	PEC Zwolle	18	5	4	9	27	39	−12	14	
8	NEC Nijmegen	18	5	4	9	20	31	−11	14	
9	Enschedese Boys	18	5	4	9	28	46	−18	14	
10	HVV Hengelo	18	5	2	11	28	47	−19	12	Relegated to 2nd Division

Source: rsssf.com

=== Play-off ===
Team 1	Score	Team 2
AGOVV Apeldoorn	1 - 1	Quick Nijmegen

AGOVV Apeldoorn qualified for the Championship Play-offs owing to a better Goal Average(!)

=== Eerste Klasse North ===
Pos	Team	Pld	W	D	L	GF	GA	GD	Pts	Qualification
1	sc Heerenveen	18	14	3	1	77	31	+46	31	Qualified for Championship play-off
2	GVAV Rapiditas	18	10	4	4	52	29	+23	24	
3	HSC	18	8	4	6	48	41	+7	20	
4	VV Leeuwarden	18	9	1	8	45	48	−3	19	
5	Be Quick 1887	18	6	5	7	42	45	−3	17	
6	Achilles 1894	18	6	3	9	34	47	−13	15	
7	Veendam	18	5	5	8	37	56	−19	15	
8	Velocitas 1897	18	4	5	9	33	40	−7	13	
9	LSC Sneek	18	4	5	9	30	44	−14	13	
10	Sneek Wit Zwart	18	4	5	9	18	35	−17	13	

Source: rsssf.com

=== Eerste Klasse South ===
Pos	Team	Pld	W	D	L	GF	GA	GD	Pts	Qualification or relegation
1	FC Eindhoven	22	13	7	2	50	16	+34	33	Qualified for Championship play-off
2	NAC	22	13	5	4	71	39	+32	31	
3	Willem II	22	12	7	3	45	25	+20	31	
4	BVV Den Bosch	22	11	5	6	47	28	+19	27	
5	MVV Maastricht	22	11	4	7	49	30	+19	26	
6	Spekholzerheide	21	9	5	7	47	33	+14	23	
7	LONGA	21	8	7	6	36	32	+4	21 (Note: 2 points deducted for failing to play a match against Spekholzerheide.)	
8	PSV Eindhoven	22	7	5	10	37	44	−7	19	
9	Picus	22	4	5	13	18	53	−35	13	
10	NOAD	22	4	4	14	29	56	−27	12	
11	RFC Roermond	22	2	8	12	25	55	−30	12	
12	HVV Helmond	22	3	6	13	20	63	−43	12	Relegated to 2nd Division

Source: rsssf.com

=== Eerste Klasse West-I ===
Pos	Team	Pld	W	D	L	GF	GA	GD	Pts	Qualification or relegation
1	ADO Den Haag	18	11	2	5	48	27	+21	24	Qualified for Championship play-off
2	Feijenoord	18	10	2	6	39	34	+5	22	Moved to Division West-II next season
3	DWS	18	8	5	5	28	21	+7	21	
4	DFC	18	9	3	6	43	38	+5	21	
5	Xerxes	18	7	6	5	41	33	+8	20	
6	AFC Ajax	18	6	7	5	32	27	+5	19	Moved to Division West-II next season
7	VUC	18	7	4	7	46	52	−6	18	Moved to Division West-II next season
8	Stormvogels	18	6	3	9	34	42	−8	15	
9	HFC EDO	18	4	6	8	32	36	−4	14	
10	DOS	18	2	2	14	34	67	−33	6	Relegated to 2nd Division

Source: rsssf.com

=== Eerste Klasse West-II ===
Pos	Team	Pld	W	D	L	GF	GA	GD	Pts	Qualification
1	Blauw-Wit Amsterdam	18	13	1	4	55	32	+23	27	Qualified for Championship play-off
2	HBS Craeyenhout	18	9	4	5	62	41	+21	22	Moved to Division West-I next season
3	RFC Rotterdam	18	9	3	6	47	38	+9	21	
4	DHC Delft	18	8	3	7	39	46	−7	19	
5	SC Emma	18	7	4	7	37	34	+3	18	
6	Hermes DVS	18	7	3	8	46	48	−2	17	Moved to Division West-I next season
7	Sparta Rotterdam	18	5	6	7	45	54	−9	16	Moved to Division West-I next season
8	HFC Haarlem	18	7	1	10	37	50	−13	15	
9	VSV	18	5	3	10	39	55	−16	13	
10	HVV 't Gooi	18	4	4	10	33	42	−9	12	

Source: rsssf.com

=== Championship play-off ===
Pos	Team	Pld	W	D	L	GF	GA	GD	Pts	ADO	EIN	AGO	BWA	HEE
1	ADO Den Haag	8	3	4	1	16	11	+5	10		2–2	5–2	2–0	1–2
2	FC Eindhoven	8	3	3	2	10	8	+2	9	1–1		0–1	3–0	2–0
3	AGOVV Apeldoorn	8	3	2	3	14	16	−2	8	1–1	3–0		1–5	4–0
4	Blauw-Wit Amsterdam	8	3	1	4	14	13	+1	7	1–2	0–1	4–1		2–1
5	sc Heerenveen	8	1	4	3	9	15	−6	6	2–2	1–1	1–1	2–2	

Source: rsssf.com
