= 1899–1900 Netherlands Football League Championship =

Netherl. Football Championship
- Season: 1899–1900
- Champions: HVV Den Haag (3rd title)

The Netherlands Football League Championship 1899–1900 was contested by thirteen teams participating in two divisions. The national champion would be determined by a play-off featuring the winners of the eastern and western football division of the Netherlands. HVV Den Haag won this year's championship by beating Victoria Wageningen 1–0 in a decision match.

== New entrants ==
Eerste Klasse East:

- Hercules
- Victoria Wageningen

Eerste Klasse West:

- Ajax Sportman Combinatie (also known as Ajax Leiden)

== Divisions ==
=== Eerste Klasse East ===
Pos	Team	Pld	W	D	L	GF	GA	GD	Pts	Qualification
1	Victoria Wageningen	10	6	3	1	28	8	+20	15	Qualified for Championship play-off
2	Go Ahead Wageningen	10	4	4	2	18	12	+6	12	
3	Quick Nijmegen	10	3	4	3	14	13	+1	10	
4	Vitesse Arnhem	10	4	2	4	12	22	−10	10	
5	Hercules	10	3	1	6	13	22	−9	7	
6	PW	10	2	2	6	15	23	−8	6	

Source: rsssf.com

=== Eerste Klasse West ===
Pos	Team	Pld	W	D	L	GF	GA	GD	Pts	Qualification
1	HVV Den Haag	12	10	1	1	45	22	+23	21	Qualified for Championship play-off
2	Ajax Sportman Combinatie	12	6	4	2	28	14	+14	16	
3	RAP	12	6	3	3	37	16	+21	15	
4	Sparta Rotterdam	12	5	1	6	20	29	−9	11	
5	HFC Haarlem	12	4	2	6	20	27	−7	10	
6	HBS Craeyenhout	12	3	2	7	21	34	−13	8	
7	Koninklijke HFC	12	1	1	10	12	41	−29	3	Not participating next season

Source: rsssf.com

=== Championship play-off ===
Team 1	Agg.	Team 2	1st leg	2nd leg
HVV Den Haag	one win each	Victoria Wageningen	4–1	0–2

=== Replay ===
Team 1	Score	Team 2
HVV Den Haag	1–0	Victoria Wageningen

HVV Den Haag won the championship.
