= 1939–40 Netherlands Football League Championship =

Netherl. Football Championship
- Season: 1939–1940
- Champions: Feijenoord (5th title)

The Netherlands Football League Championship 1939–1940 was contested by 52 teams participating in five divisions. The national champion would be determined by a play-off featuring the winners of the eastern, northern, southern and two western football divisions of the Netherlands. Feijenoord won this year's championship by beating Blauw-Wit Amsterdam, Heracles, Juliana and GVAV Rapiditas.

This season's championship was not considered official. Owing to the start of World War II, not all teams played an equal number of matches.

== New entrants ==
Eerste Klasse East:

- Promoted from 2nd Division: Enschedese Boys

Eerste Klasse North:

- Promoted from 2nd Division: WVV Winschoten

Eerste Klasse South:

- Promoted from 2nd Division: HVV Helmond & Limburgia

Eerste Klasse West-I:

- Moving in from West-II: Ajax, DOS, HVV 't Gooi, HFC Haarlem and VSV

Eerste Klasse West-II:

- Moving in from West-I: CVV Mercurius, HBS Craeyenhout, Hermes DVS, Sparta Rotterdam and Xerxes

== Divisions ==
=== Eerste Klasse East ===
| Pos | Team | Pld | W | D | L | GF | GA | GD | Pts | Qualification |
|---|---|---|---|---|---|---|---|---|---|---|
| 1 | Heracles | 18 | 12 | 2 | 4 | 36 | 20 | +16 | 26 | Qualified for Championship play-off |
| 2 | NEC Nijmegen | 18 | 11 | 2 | 5 | 51 | 27 | +24 | 24 | |
| 3 | AGOVV Apeldoorn | 17 | 10 | 3 | 4 | 38 | 17 | +21 | 23 | |
| 4 | HVV Tubantia | 17 | 9 | 2 | 6 | 34 | 37 | −3 | 20 | |
| 5 | Go Ahead | 18 | 7 | 5 | 6 | 34 | 27 | +7 | 19 | |
| 6 | HVV Hengelo | 17 | 5 | 6 | 6 | 27 | 35 | −8 | 16 | |
| 7 | SC Enschede | 17 | 6 | 1 | 10 | 31 | 35 | −4 | 13 | |
| 8 | FC Wageningen | 17 | 4 | 5 | 8 | 28 | 47 | −19 | 13 | |
| 9 | Quick Nijmegen | 17 | 5 | 1 | 11 | 31 | 46 | −15 | 11 | |
| 10 | Enschedese Boys | 18 | 4 | 1 | 13 | 26 | 45 | −19 | 9 | |

Source: rsssf.com

=== Eerste Klasse North ===
| Pos | Team | Pld | W | D | L | GF | GA | GD | Pts | Qualification |
|---|---|---|---|---|---|---|---|---|---|---|
| 1 | GVAV Rapiditas | 18 | 14 | 2 | 2 | 58 | 25 | +33 | 30 | Qualified for Championship play-off |
| 2 | HSC | 17 | 9 | 3 | 5 | 44 | 28 | +16 | 21 | |
| 3 | Veendam | 18 | 9 | 3 | 6 | 44 | 40 | +4 | 21 | |
| 4 | Sneek Wit Zwart | 16 | 9 | 2 | 5 | 39 | 29 | +10 | 20 | |
| 5 | sc Heerenveen | 16 | 8 | 1 | 7 | 54 | 49 | +5 | 17 | |
| 6 | Achilles 1894 | 16 | 6 | 4 | 6 | 49 | 49 | 0 | 16 | |
| 7 | Velocitas 1897 | 16 | 6 | 3 | 7 | 35 | 36 | −1 | 15 | |
| 8 | VV Leeuwarden | 16 | 4 | 3 | 9 | 34 | 54 | −20 | 11 | |
| 9 | WVV Winschoten | 17 | 4 | 2 | 11 | 33 | 58 | −25 | 10 | |
| 10 | Be Quick 1887 | 16 | 1 | 3 | 12 | 27 | 49 | −22 | 5 | |

Source: rsssf.com

=== Eerste Klasse South ===
| Pos | Team | Pld | W | D | L | GF | GA | GD | Pts | Qualification |
|---|---|---|---|---|---|---|---|---|---|---|
| 1 | Juliana | 21 | 15 | 4 | 2 | 79 | 24 | +55 | 34 | Qualified for Championship play-off |
| 2 | FC Eindhoven | 22 | 12 | 5 | 5 | 57 | 32 | +25 | 29 | |
| 3 | NOAD | 20 | 13 | 3 | 4 | 45 | 30 | +15 | 29 | |
| 4 | MVV Maastricht | 21 | 13 | 2 | 6 | 48 | 28 | +20 | 28 | |
| 5 | Willem II | 21 | 10 | 5 | 6 | 42 | 36 | +6 | 25 | |
| 6 | PSV Eindhoven | 21 | 8 | 6 | 7 | 40 | 29 | +11 | 22 | |
| 7 | LONGA | 19 | 7 | 4 | 8 | 38 | 43 | −5 | 18 | |
| 8 | NAC | 20 | 7 | 4 | 9 | 30 | 38 | −8 | 18 | |
| 9 | HVV Helmond | 20 | 4 | 4 | 12 | 24 | 65 | −41 | 12 | |
| 10 | Limburgia | 20 | 5 | 1 | 14 | 31 | 48 | −17 | 11 | |
| 11 | BVV Den Bosch | 20 | 3 | 4 | 13 | 27 | 55 | −28 | 10 | |
| 12 | RFC Roermond | 19 | 3 | 2 | 14 | 23 | 56 | −33 | 8 | |

Source: rsssf.com

=== Eerste Klasse West-I ===
| Pos | Team | Pld | W | D | L | GF | GA | GD | Pts | Qualification |
|---|---|---|---|---|---|---|---|---|---|---|
| 1 | Blauw-Wit Amsterdam | 18 | 14 | 1 | 3 | 45 | 24 | +21 | 29 | Qualified for Championship play-off |
| 2 | ADO Den Haag | 18 | 13 | 2 | 3 | 55 | 25 | +30 | 28 | Division West-II next season |
| 3 | DWS | 18 | 12 | 3 | 3 | 50 | 29 | +21 | 27 | Division West-II next season |
| 4 | VSV | 18 | 9 | 3 | 6 | 55 | 32 | +23 | 21 | |
| 5 | HVV 't Gooi | 18 | 7 | 5 | 6 | 39 | 44 | −5 | 19 | Division West-II next season |
| 6 | AFC Ajax | 18 | 7 | 3 | 8 | 35 | 37 | −2 | 17 | |
| 7 | Stormvogels | 18 | 5 | 4 | 9 | 25 | 34 | −9 | 14 | Division West-II next season |
| 8 | HFC Haarlem | 18 | 5 | 1 | 12 | 40 | 61 | −21 | 11 | |
| 9 | KFC | 18 | 3 | 2 | 13 | 32 | 62 | −30 | 8 | Division West-II next season |
| 10 | DOS | 18 | 1 | 4 | 13 | 35 | 63 | −28 | 6 | |

Source: rsssf.com

=== Eerste Klasse West-II ===
| Pos | Team | Pld | W | D | L | GF | GA | GD | Pts | Qualification |
|---|---|---|---|---|---|---|---|---|---|---|
| 1 | Feijenoord | 18 | 12 | 5 | 1 | 51 | 16 | +35 | 29 | Qualified for Championship play-off |
| 2 | Sparta Rotterdam | 18 | 9 | 5 | 4 | 66 | 44 | +22 | 23 | |
| 3 | HBS Craeyenhout | 18 | 10 | 3 | 5 | 56 | 47 | +9 | 23 | Division West-I next season |
| 4 | Hermes DVS | 18 | 7 | 6 | 5 | 51 | 46 | +5 | 20 | |
| 5 | DFC | 18 | 8 | 3 | 7 | 35 | 30 | +5 | 19 | |
| 6 | DHC | 18 | 6 | 6 | 6 | 45 | 40 | +5 | 18 | |
| 7 | RFC | 18 | 7 | 3 | 8 | 37 | 34 | +3 | 17 | Division West-I next season |
| 8 | VUC | 18 | 6 | 4 | 8 | 39 | 58 | −19 | 16 | Division West-I next season |
| 9 | Xerxes | 18 | 4 | 5 | 9 | 39 | 63 | −24 | 13 | Division West-I next season |
| 10 | CVV Mercurius | 18 | 0 | 2 | 16 | 18 | 59 | −41 | 2 | Division West-I next season |

Source: rsssf.com

=== Championship play-off ===
| Pos | Team | Pld | W | D | L | GF | GA | GD | Pts | FEY | BWA | HER | JUL | GVA |
|---|---|---|---|---|---|---|---|---|---|---|---|---|---|---|
| 1 | Feijenoord | 8 | 5 | 1 | 2 | 19 | 14 | +5 | 11 | | 3–2 | 2–0 | 6–1 | 3–3 |
| 2 | Blauw-Wit Amsterdam | 8 | 3 | 3 | 2 | 20 | 15 | +5 | 9 | 5–1 | | 3–4 | 2–2 | 3–1 |
| 3 | Heracles | 8 | 4 | 1 | 3 | 18 | 15 | +3 | 9 | 1–2 | 1–1 | | 2–0 | 5–2 |
| 4 | Juliana | 8 | 3 | 3 | 2 | 17 | 19 | −2 | 9 | 2–0 | 2–2 | 4–2 | | 2–2 |
| 5 | GVAV Rapiditas | 8 | 0 | 2 | 6 | 13 | 24 | −11 | 2 | 0–2 | 1–2 | 1–3 | 3–4 | |

Source: rsssf.com
