= 1900–01 Netherlands Football League Championship =

Netherl. Football Championship
- Season: 1900–01
- Champions: HVV Den Haag (4th title)

The Netherlands Football League Championship 1900–1901 was contested by fifteen teams participating in two divisions. The national champion would be determined by a play-off match featuring the winners of the eastern and western football division of the Netherlands. HVV Den Haag won this year's championship by beating Victoria Wageningen 2–1 in a decision match.

== New entrants ==
Eerste Klasse East:

- U.D. returned after one season of absence

Eerste Klasse West:

- Rapiditas Rotterdam returned after one season of absence
- Velocitas

== Divisions ==
=== Eerste Klasse East ===
Pos	Team	Pld	W	D	L	GF	GA	GD	Pts	Qualification
1	Victoria Wageningen	12	9	2	1	44	12	+32	20	Qualified for Championship play-off
2	Hercules	12	6	4	2	30	17	+13	16	
3	PW	12	5	4	3	43	27	+16	14	
4	Vitesse Arnhem	12	5	1	6	29	28	+1	11	
5	Go Ahead Wageningen	12	4	2	6	26	41	−15	10	
6	Quick Nijmegen	12	4	2	6	23	37	−14	10	
7	U.D.	12	0	3	9	9	42	−33	3	

Source: rsssf.com

=== Eerste Klasse West ===
Pos	Team	Pld	W	D	L	GF	GA	GD	Pts	Qualification
1	HVV Den Haag	14	11	2	1	54	12	+42	24	Qualified for Championship play-off
2	Velocitas	14	8	5	1	30	14	+16	21	
3	HBS Craeyenhout	14	7	4	3	39	25	+14	18	
4	RAP	14	6	2	6	22	20	+2	14	
5	Ajax Sportman Combinatie	14	5	3	6	24	27	−3	13	
6	HFC Haarlem	14	5	0	9	26	45	−19	10	
7	Rapiditas Rotterdam	14	4	1	9	25	36	−11	9	
8	Sparta Rotterdam	14	0	3	11	9	50	−41	3	Not participating next season

Source: rsssf.com

=== Championship play-off ===
Team 1	Agg.	Team 2	1st leg	2nd leg
Victoria Wageningen	one win each	HVV Den Haag	0–1	2–1

=== Replay ===
Team 1	Score	Team 2
Victoria Wageningen	1–2	HVV Den Haag

HVV Den Haag won the championship.
