= 1893–94 Netherlands Football League Championship =

Netherl. Football Championship
- Season: 1893–94
- Champions: RAP (2nd title)

The Netherlands Football League Championship 1893–1894 was contested by six teams from the cities Amsterdam, The Hague, Haarlem, Rotterdam and Wageningen. The teams participated in the competition that would later be called Eerste Klasse West. But since the western football district of the Netherlands was the only one to have a competition at the time, it could be regarded as a national championship. This was also the reason that Go Ahead Wageningen participated, as they would later play in the eastern division. RAP Amsterdam won the championship.

== New entrants ==
- Go Ahead Wageningen
- Sparta Rotterdam

== League standings ==
Pos	Team	Pld	W	D	L	GF	GA	GD	Pts	Qualification
1	RAP	10	8	0	2	27	8	+19	16	
2	Koninklijke HFC	10	7	0	3	31	13	+18	14	
3	HVV Den Haag	10	6	1	3	20	20	0	13	
4	Sparta Rotterdam	10	4	1	5	14	24	−10	9	
5	Go Ahead Wageningen	10	3	0	7	16	22	−6	6	
6	Victoria Rotterdam	10	1	0	9	9	30	−21	2	Not participating next season

Source: rsssf.com
