= 1943–44 Netherlands Football League Championship =

Netherlands Football Championship
- Season: 1943–1944
- Champions: De Volewijckers (1st title)

The Netherlands Football League Championship 1943–1944 was contested by 52 teams participating in five divisions. The national champion would be determined by a play-off featuring the winners of the eastern, northern, southern and two western football divisions of the Netherlands. De Volewijckers won this year's championship by beating VUC, LONGA, sc Heerenveen and Heracles.

== Divisions ==
=== Eerste Klasse East ===
Pos	Team	Pld	W	D	L	GF	GA	GD	Pts	Qualification
1	Heracles	18	11	5	2	37	16	+21	27	Qualified for Championship play-off
2	Go Ahead	18	9	5	4	43	27	+16	23	
3	NEC Nijmegen	17	10	1	6	47	30	+17	21	
4	AGOVV Apeldoorn	18	10	1	7	39	29	+10	21	
5	Quick Nijmegen	18	6	6	6	39	38	+1	18	
6	Enschedese Boys	18	7	4	7	35	38	−3	18	
7	FC Wageningen	18	7	3	8	28	25	+3	17	
8	SC Enschede	18	4	5	9	26	34	−8	13	
9	HVV Tubantia	17	4	2	11	27	51	−24	10	
10	PEC Zwolle	18	4	2	12	18	51	−33	10	

Source: rsssf.com

=== Eerste Klasse North ===
Pos	Team	Pld	W	D	L	GF	GA	GD	Pts	Qualification
1	sc Heerenveen	18	16	1	1	85	20	+65	33	Qualified for Championship play-off
2	LSC Sneek	18	10	3	5	39	21	+18	23	
3	HSC	18	9	3	6	43	35	+8	21	
4	Achilles 1894	18	7	5	6	33	37	−4	19	
5	Be Quick 1887	18	7	4	7	27	40	−13	18	
6	VV Leeuwarden	18	6	4	8	27	41	−14	16	
7	Veendam	18	5	4	9	33	42	−9	14	
8	Velocitas 1897	18	4	6	8	13	31	−18	14	
9	GVAV Rapiditas	18	4	4	10	22	40	−18	12	
10	Sneek Wit Zwart	18	3	4	11	26	41	−15	10	

Source: rsssf.com

=== Eerste Klasse South ===
Pos	Team	Pld	W	D	L	GF	GA	GD	Pts	Qualification
1	LONGA	23	14	3	6	49	38	+11	31	Qualified for Championship play-off
2	PSV Eindhoven	23	14	1	8	59	41	+18	29	Moved to Division South-II next season
3	MVV Maastricht	22	10	7	5	49	30	+19	27	Moved to Division South-II next season
4	NAC	22	11	4	7	58	37	+21	26	
5	Willem II	22	8	10	4	45	34	+11	26	
6	FC Eindhoven	22	12	2	8	52	40	+12	26	
7	BVV Den Bosch	22	11	3	8	60	33	+27	25	
8	Maurits	22	10	2	10	45	45	0	22	Moved to Division South-II next season
9	De Spechten	22	6	6	10	44	63	−19	18	Moved to Division South-II next season
10	NOAD	22	6	3	13	35	63	−28	15	
11	Spekholzerheide (Note: Changed name back to Juliana)	22	4	3	15	25	64	−39	11	Moved to Division South-II next season
12	RFC Roermond	22	3	4	15	28	61	−33	10	Moved to Division South-II next season

Source: rsssf.com

=== Eerste Klasse West-I ===
Pos	Team	Pld	W	D	L	GF	GA	GD	Pts	Qualification
1	De Volewijckers	18	14	1	3	59	27	+32	29	Qualified for Championship play-off
2	Hermes DVS	18	12	2	4	56	34	+22	26	
3	Xerxes	18	10	2	6	44	33	+11	22	
4	DWS	18	8	4	6	37	29	+8	20	Moved to Division West-II next season
5	DFC	18	7	5	6	46	37	+9	19	Moved to Division West-II next season
6	ADO Den Haag	18	7	2	9	45	38	+7	16	
7	Sparta Rotterdam	18	6	3	9	37	47	−10	15	Moved to Division West-II next season
8	HBS Craeyenhout	18	7	0	11	34	56	−22	14	Moved to Division West-II next season
9	HFC EDO	18	5	3	10	26	44	−18	13	
10	Stormvogels	18	2	2	14	17	56	−39	6	Moved to Division West-II next season

Source: rsssf.com

=== Eerste Klasse West-II ===
Pos	Team	Pld	W	D	L	GF	GA	GD	Pts	Qualification
1	VUC	18	11	3	4	67	44	+23	25	Qualified for Championship play-off
2	AFC Ajax	18	10	3	5	53	28	+25	23	Moved to Division West-I next season
3	DHC	18	9	3	6	34	22	+12	21	
4	VSV	18	8	4	6	42	46	−4	20	Moved to Division West-I next season
5	Feijenoord	18	6	7	5	30	28	+2	19	
6	Blauw-Wit Amsterdam	18	7	5	6	33	32	+1	19	
7	SC Emma	18	6	3	9	31	46	−15	15	Moved to Division West-I next season
8	HFC Haarlem	18	6	3	9	35	51	−16	15	
9	RFC Rotterdam	18	5	2	11	38	48	−10	12	Moved to Division West-I next season
10	HVV 't Gooi	18	5	1	12	33	51	−18	11	Moved to Division West-I next season

Source: rsssf.com

=== Championship play-off ===
Pos	Team	Pld	W	D	L	GF	GA	GD	Pts	VOL	VUC	LON	HEE	HER
1	De Volewijckers	8	6	0	2	31	11	+20	12		5–1	5–3	4–1	5–0
2	VUC	8	4	2	2	17	15	+2	10	2–0		2–3	3–3	1–1
3	LONGA	8	4	1	3	19	17	+2	9	2–1	0–2		3–4	1–1
4	sc Heerenveen	8	2	2	4	16	23	−7	6	1–5	2–4	0–1		2–2
5	Heracles	8	0	3	5	9	26	−17	3	1–6	1–2	2–6	1–3	

Source: rsssf.com
