= 1896–97 Netherlands Football League Championship =

Netherl. Football Championship
- Season: 1896–97
- Champions: RAP (3rd title)

The Netherlands Football League Championship 1896–1897 was contested by seven teams from the cities Amsterdam, The Hague, Haarlem and Rotterdam. The teams participated in the competition that would later be called Eerste Klasse West. But since the western football district of the Netherlands was the only one to have a competition at the time, it could be regarded as a national championship. It was the last year that this was the case: next season would mark the first season of the Eerste Klasse East which meant that the national champion would be determined by play-off matches between the division winners. RAP won this year's championship.

== New entrant ==
- HBS Craeyenhout

== League standings ==
Pos	Team	Pld	W	D	L	GF	GA	GD	Pts	Qualification
1	RAP	12	10	1	1	52	10	+42	21	
2	HVV Den Haag	12	7	2	3	44	12	+32	16	
3	HBS Craeyenhout	12	7	0	5	20	22	−2	14	
4	Sparta Rotterdam	12	5	2	5	20	30	−10	12	
5	Rapiditas Rotterdam	12	5	1	6	28	25	+3	11	
6	Victoria Rotterdam	12	3	2	7	19	43	−24	8	Not participating next season
7	Koninklijke HFC	12	1	0	11	10	51	−41	2	Not participating next season

Source: rsssf.com
