= Dolf Scheeffer =

Dutch footballer

Personal information
- Date of birth: 29 November 1907
- Date of death: 26 October 1966 (aged 58)

International career
Years	Team	Apps	(Gls)
1927	Netherlands	1	(0)

Dolf Scheeffer (29 November 1907 – 26 October 1966) was a Dutch footballer. He played in one match for the Netherlands national football team in 1927.
