= 1895–96 Netherlands Football League Championship =

Netherl. Football Championship
- Season: 1895–96
- Champions: HVV Den Haag (2nd title)

The Netherlands Football League Championship 1895–1896 was contested by seven teams from the cities Amsterdam, The Hague, Haarlem, Rotterdam and Wageningen. The teams participated in the competition that would later be called Eerste Klasse West. But since the western football district of the Netherlands was the only one to have a competition at the time, it could be regarded as a national championship. This was also the reason that Go Ahead Wageningen participated, as they would later play in the eastern division. HVV Den Haag won the championship.

== New entrant ==
- Victoria Rotterdam returned after one season of absence

== League standings ==
Pos	Team	Pld	W	D	L	GF	GA	GD	Pts	Qualification
1	HVV Den Haag	12	10	2	0	33	12	+21	22	
2	RAP	12	8	1	3	52	11	+41	17	
3	Sparta Rotterdam	12	8	1	3	30	18	+12	17	
4	Victoria Rotterdam	12	4	0	8	20	35	−15	8	
5	Koninklijke HFC	12	3	2	7	18	42	−24	8	
6	Rapiditas Rotterdam	12	3	1	8	27	35	−8	7	
7	Go Ahead Wageningen	12	2	1	9	24	51	−27	5	Not participating next season

Source: rsssf.com
