= A.V.& C.V. Robur et Velocitas =

Dutch sport club

Robur et Velocitas
- Full name: Apeldoornsche Voetbal & Cricket Vereniging Robur et Velocitas
- Founded: 6 May 1882; 144 years ago
- Ground: Sportpark Kerschoten, Apeldoorn, Netherlands
- Chairman: Fred Sterk
- Manager: Eusebio Paol
- League: Tweede Klasse G East - Saturday (2025–26)
- 2025-26: 4th
- Website: Official
Home colours

A.V.& C.V. Robur et Velocitas is a Dutch football club based in Apeldoorn.

== History ==
Founded as a cricket club in 1882, football was added in 1887 making Robur et Velocitas the oldest football club of Gelderland and the fourth-oldest in the country. In the early years of football in the Netherlands, the club spent multiple seasons (from 1913 to 1918)) in the top-tier Eerste Klasse East en was semi-finalist in the KNVB Beker, losing to Koninklijke HFC in 1913 and to DFC in 1914.

=== Notable players ===
- (Netherlands) Gino Bosz (2024-)
- (Netherlands) Jan Elfring (1929–1938)
- (Netherlands) Julius Wille
