= UVV Utrecht =

Dutch sports club

Information
- League: Honkbal Hoofdklasse
- Location: Utrecht
- Ballpark: Sportpark Paperclip
- Founded: 1902
- 2025: 15–34–2
- Former name: Utrechtse Voetbal Vereniging, UVV Pickles, Red Lions, Wild Cats
- President: Merijn van Elsacker
- Website: hsvuvv.nl, uvv-voetbal.nl

UVV Utrecht is a sports club based in Utrecht, the Netherlands. It was founded in 1902 in a merger between several clubs that date back to 1893. In 2009, the club removed its former acronym, Utrechtse Voetbal Vereniging (Utrecht Football Association), and is now known by the three letters UVV. The club has teams in the following sports: football, tennis, baseball, softball, and beach volleyball.

The baseball team competes in the Honkbal Hoofdklasse, the top Dutch league. The team plays at the Sportpark Paperclip. The UVV baseball stadium has a capacity of 1,000. The baseball team was formerly named UVV Pickles due to an advertising agreement. The club rejoined the Hoofdklasse in 2023, replacing Silicon Storks.

The club's top men's football team competes in the amateur Vierde Klasse, the ninth tier of Dutch club football. The women's team plays in the amateur Eerste Klasse, the fourth tier of Dutch club football.

== Notable former football players ==
- (Netherlands) Marco van Basten
- (Netherlands) Piet van Reenen
- (Netherlands) Wout Buitenweg
- (Netherlands) Harry van den Ham
- (Netherlands) John van Loen
- (Netherlands) Alje Schut
- (Netherlands) Jan Vos
- (Netherlands) Jan Willem van Ede
- (Netherlands) Erik Tammer
