= Volharding Olympia Combinatie =

Dutch cricket and football club

Volharding Olympia Combinatie (VOC) is a cricket and association football club from Rotterdam, Netherlands. Its home ground is Sportpark Hazelaarweg in Hillegersberg-Schiebroek.

== History ==
VOC was formed on 1 January 1904 as a merger of RC & VV Volharding (1 January 1895) and RV & CV Olympia (23 May 1885). The foundation date of Volharding is maintained as the official establishment date. In 1905 and 1907 VOC football won the national cup.

The male first squad football promoted in 2019 to the Hoofdklasse, after winning a championship in the Eerste Klasse.

== Former players ==
- Anton Bakker
- Anton Hörburger
- Arnold Hörburger
- Geert den Ouden
- Dirk van Prooye
- Jan van der Sluis
- Thomas Verhaar
- Martijn de Vries
- Wally van Weelde
- Bas Zuiderant
