= Achilles 1894 =

Dutch football club

- Full name: Achilles 1894
- Founded: 24 December 1894
- Ground: Sportpark Marsdijk, Assen
- League: Hoofdklasse Sunday A (2017–18)
- Website: http://www.achilles1894.nl/
Home colours

Achilles 1894 is a football club from Assen in Drenthe, Netherlands. Achilles 1894 plays in the Tweede Klasse.

Achilles won the championship of North Netherlands in 1939 and qualified for the National championship play off competition where they finished 5th.

Achilles was the first club from Drenthe who played in the National championship play off competition. FC Emmen became the second club of Drenthe to do so in the season 2018–2019.
