= Ajax Sportsman Combinatie =

Dutch football and cricket club

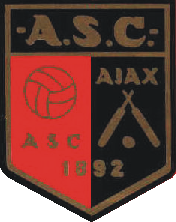
The logo of Ajax Sportsman Combinatie

The Ajax Sportsman Combinatie, usually known as ASC, is a Dutch football and cricket club, established in 1918 as a merger of the Leidsche Cricket- en Football-Club Ajax and Leidsche Athletiekvereeniging De Sportsman.

== Ajax ==
The Leidsche Cricket- en Football-Club Ajax was established on 1 June 1892, and played its first match in 1895. As the name indicates, the club was originally based in Leiden. The club moved to Oegstgeest in 1917, and was officially registered as an Oegstgeest-based club in 1985.

Ajax won its first title in 1899, in the Tweede Klasse, then the second tier of football in the Netherlands. The club didn't lose any of the 12 matches that season, and had a goal difference of 64–6. Key player L. Koolemans-Beijnen was selected for a precursor of the Netherlands national football team. Ajax reached the final of the Dutch cup competition in 1900, losing 3–1 to Velocitas of Breda in the final.

== Sportsman ==
Athletiekvereeniging De Sportman was established on August 30, 1896. It was involved in athletics, rowing, shooting, gymnastics, cycling and speed skating.
