= Koninklijke UD =

Dutch sport club

- Full name: Koninklijke Deventer Cricket & Football Club Utile Dulci 1875
- Founded: 13 October 1875; 150 years ago
- Ground: Het Schootsveld, Deventer, Netherlands
- Chairman: Gigi Splinter
- Manager: Roy Birahy
- League: Vijfde Klasse C East - Saturday (2025–26)
- 2025-26: 11th
- Website: Official
Home colours

Koninklijke UD 1875 is a Dutch football club based in Deventer and is the oldest outdoor field sports club in the Netherlands. UD stands for Utile Dulci which is Latin and stands for combining the useful and pleasant.

== History ==
Founded as cricketclub Utile Dulci (U.D.) in 1875, football was added in 1894 after a merger with Excelsior making Koninklijke UD the oldest football club of Overijssel and one of the oldest in the country. In the early years of football in the Netherlands, the club spent multiple seasons (from 1898 to 1925)) in the top-tier Eerste Klasse East with their best result losing the 1907–08 Netherlands Football League Championship final to HV & CV Quick. They were officially renamed Koninklijke UD at the 100th anniversary of the club in 1975.

Cricket became the smaller department of the club but was still played and they won the 1990 Dutch league title.

=== Notable players ===
- (Netherlands) Piet Bouman (1916-1918)
- (Netherlands) Jan Kok (1907–1910)
- (Netherlands) Dolf Scheeffer (1926-1928)
- (Netherlands) David Wijnveldt (1911-1915)
