= List of AFC Ajax honours =

Below is a list of all trophies and awards that have been won in all sports and competitions by AFC Ajax, since the club's inception 18 March 1900.

== Football ==
=== National championship ===
==== Professional level ====
Ajax I

- Eredivisie: 28

1956–57, 1959–60, 1965–66, 1966–67, 1967–68, 1969–70, 1971–72, 1972–73, 1976–77, 1978–79, 1979–80, 1981–82, 1982–83, 1984–85, 1989–90, 1993–94, 1994–95, 1995–96, 1997–98, 2001–02, 2003–04, 2010–11, 2011–12, 2012–13, 2013–14, 2018–19, 2020–21, 2021–22

- Netherlands Football League Championship: 8

1917–18, 1918–19, 1930–31, 1931–32, 1933–34, 1936–37, 1938–39, 1946–47,

→ Golden championship stars on the badge: 3 (1 for every 10 national titles, 36 in total)

Ajax II

- Eerste Divisie: 1

2017–18

==== Amateur level ====
- Eerste Klasse: 19

1917–18, 1918–19 (West A)
1920–21 (West)
1926–27, 1927–28, 1929–30, 1930–31, 1931–32, 1933–34, 1934–35, 1935–36, 1936–37, 1945–46, 1946–47 (West I)
1938–39, 1949–50 (West II)
1951–52, 2002–03, 2011–12 (1e Klasse A)

- Tweede Klasse: 1

1910–11

==== Reserves competition ====
- Beloften Eredivisie: 8

1993–94, 1995–96, 1997–98, 2000–01, 2001–02, 2003–04, 2004–05, 2008–09

- Reserve Hoofdklasse: 4

2004–05, 2006–07, 2011–12, 2012–13

- Reserve Eerste Klasse: 2

2011–12, 2012–13

==== Women's competition ====
- Women's Eredivisie: 3

2016–17, 2017–18, 2022–23

==== Youth levels ====
- A-junioren Eredivisie: 17

1992–93, 1993–94, 1994–95, 1995–96, 1996–97, 1997–98, 2001–02, 2003–04, 2004–05, 2005–06, 2010–11, 2011–12, 2013–14, 2014-15, 2015–16, 2016–17, 2018–19

- A-junioren Eerste Divisie: 4

2004–05, 2007–08, 2008–09, 2010–11

- B-junioren Eredivisie: 5

2002–03, 2007–08, 2009–10, 2011–12, 2016–17

- B-junioren Eerste Divisie: 1

2006–07

- C-junioren Algeheel landskampioen: 3

2011–12, 2013–14, 2016–17

- C-junioren Eerste Divisie: 2

2008–09, 2011–12

- C 2 kampioen: 3

2009–10, 2011–12, 2016–17

- D-junioren Algeheel landskampioen: 2

2011–12, 2016–17

- D-junioren Eerste Divisie: 7

2001–02, 2002–03, 2003–04, 2006–07, 2007–08, 2010–11, 2011–12

- D 2 District West 1 kampioen: 5

2004–05, 2005–06, 2009–10, 2010–11, 2013–14

- D 3 kampioen: 1

2009–10

- E 1 kampioen: 3

2004–05, 2013–14, 2016–17

- E 2 kampioen: 3

2009–10, 2010–11, 2013–14

- E 3 kampioen: 1

2009–10

- F 1 kampioen: 3

2009–10, 2010–11, 2013–14

=== National Cup ===
==== Professional level ====
- KNVB Cup: 20

1916–17, 1942–43, 1960–61, 1966–67, 1969–70, 1970–71, 1971–72, 1978–79, 1982–83, 1985–86, 1986–87, 1992–93, 1997–98, 1998–99, 2001–02, 2005–06, 2006–07, 2009–10, 2018–19, 2020–21

==== Amateur level ====
- KNVB Amateur Cup: 1

1983–84

- KNVB District Cup: 5

1983–84, 1986–87, 1992–93, 2004–05, 2007–08

==== Reserves competition ====
- KNVB Reserve Cup: 3

2002–03, 2003–04, 2011–12

==== Women's competition ====
- KNVB Women's Cup: 5

2013–14, 2016–17, 2017–18, 2018–19, 2021–22

==== Youth levels ====
- A-junioren Cup: 3

2009–10, 2016–17, 2018–19

- B-junioren Cup: 2

2008–09, 2012–13

- C-junioren Cup: 1

2013–14

- D-junioren Cup: 1

2012–13

- F-pupillen District Cup: 1

2009–10

=== Dutch Super Cup ===
==== Professional level ====
- Johan Cruyff Shield: 9

1993, 1994, 1995, 2002, 2005, 2006, 2007, 2013, 2019

==== Youth levels ====
- A-junioren Supercup: 5

2005, 2006, 2011, 2014, 2016

- B-junioren Supercup: 2

2009, 2012

- C-junioren Supercup: 2

2012, 2014

- D-junioren Supercup: 2

2010, 2016

=== International championship ===
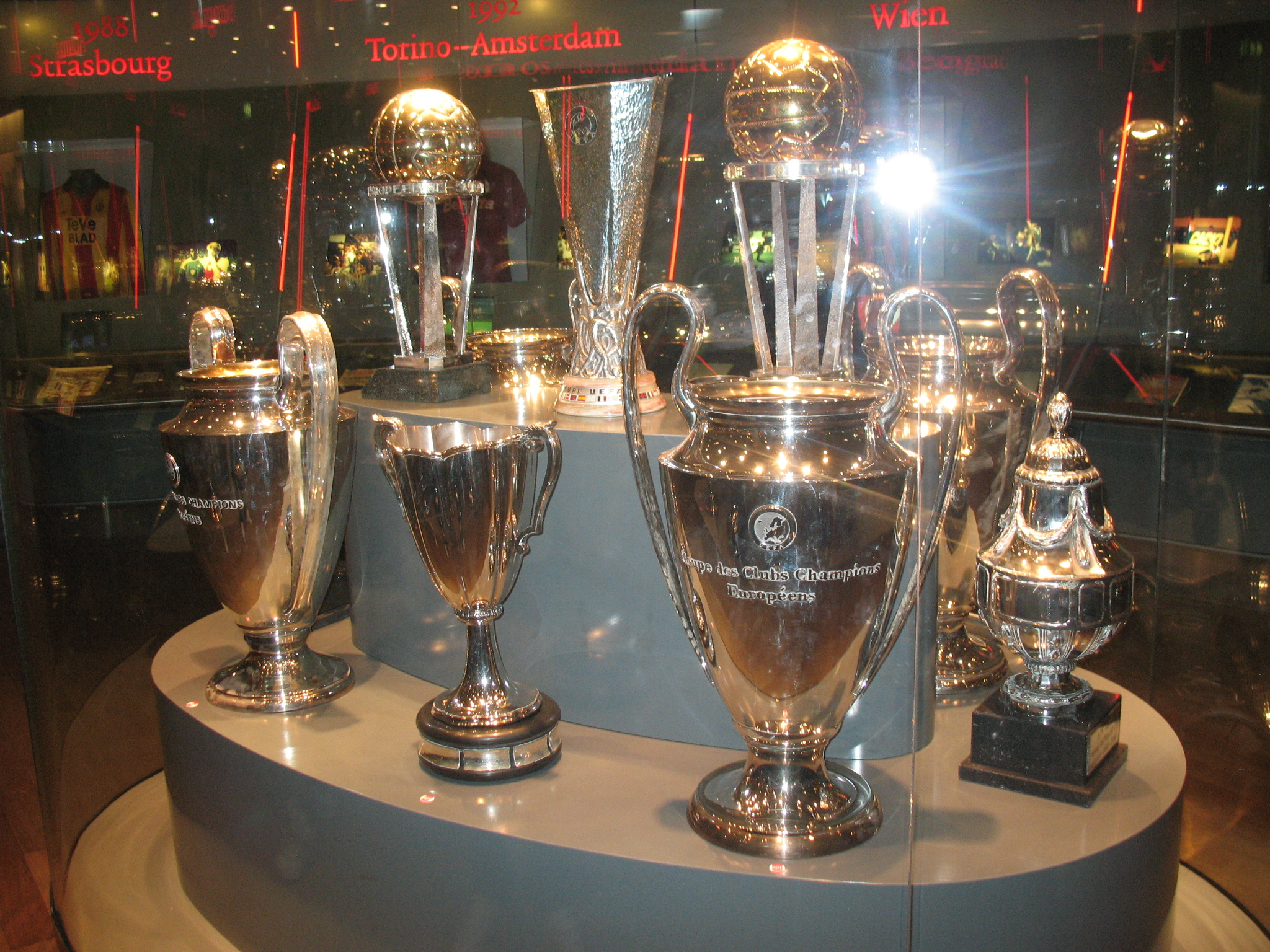
Several of Ajax' international trophies

==== Professional level ====
- European Cup / Champions League: 4

1971, 1972, 1973, 1995

- European Cup Winners' Cup: 1

1987

- UEFA Cup: 1

1992

- Intertoto Cup: 1

1961–62

==== Youth levels ====
- NextGen Series: Runners-up

2011–12

=== International Super cups ===
==== Professional level ====
- UEFA Super Cup: 2 (Note: UEFA sanctioned the UEFA Super Cup for the first time in 1973. In 1972 was an unofficial edition and the I Centenary of Rangers F.C. *(Ajax also won in 1972, however, UEFA only sanctioned the UEFA Super Cup for the first time in 1973 so the 1972 edition was an unofficial one. Played against Rangers, winners of the 1971–72 European Cup Winners' Cup, it actually went ahead as 'a celebration of the I Centenary of Rangers F.C.' because Rangers were serving a one-year ban at the time imposed by UEFA for the misbehaviour of their fans.)

1974, 1995

- Rangers First Centenary 1872–1972: 1

1972

=== World championship ===
==== Professional level ====
- Intercontinental Cup: 2

1972, 1995

=== National Tournaments ===
==== Professional level ====
- Gouden Kruis: 5

1906, 1909, 1910, 1911, 1924

- Zilvernen Bal: Runners-up

1916

- Gouden Meerbeker: 3

1917, 1918, 1919

- Arol Beker: 5

1933, 1934, 1941, 1949, 1951

- Vriendenloterij Vriendencup: 1

2012

==== Youth levels ====
- Den Helder Maritime Tournament: 2

1996, 2010

=== International Tournaments ===
==== Professional level ====
- (Netherlands) Ajax Amsterdam Easter Tournament: 4

1934, 1949, 1950, 1952

- (Netherlands) Amsterdam 700 Tournament / Amsterdam Tournament: 10

1978, 1980, 1985, 1987, 1991, 1992, 2001, 2002, 2003, 2004

- (Netherlands) Blauw-Wit Amsterdam Easter Tournament: 1

1938

- (Netherlands) Tiel Tournament: 1

1952

- (Netherlands) HFC Tournament: 1

1973

- (Netherlands) Molenbeek Tournament: 1

1983

- (Belgium) Tournoi de Bruxelles du Daring Club: 1

1935

- (Belgium) HCS Voetbal Cup: 1

1990

- (Belgium) Bruges Matins Trophy: 2

1994, 1997

- (Spain) Trofeo Santiago Bernabéu: 1

1992

- (Spain) Trofeo Villa de Benidorm: 1

1995

- (Spain) Trofeo Concepción Arenal: 1

1995

- (Portugal) Winter Algarve Cup: 1

2003

- (Portugal) Eusébio Cup: 1

2014

- (Italy) Nicola Ceravalo Tournament: 1

1992

- (France) Tournoi Indoor de Paris-Bercy: 1

1989

- (Wales) VansDirect Trophy: 1

2008

- (England) Ted Bates Trophy: 1

2009

- (Greece) Tournament of Olympiakos Piraeus: 1

1988

- (Norway) SK Brann Anniversary Tournament in Bergen: 1

1978

- (Finland) Jalkapalloturnaus: 1

1993

- (Sweden) Alfred Berg Cup: 1

2003

- (South Africa) Total Cup: 1

2005

- (Netherlands Antilles) Chippie Polar Cup: 1

2010

==== Youth levels ====
- (Netherlands) Copa Amsterdam: 3

2007, 2011, 2019

- (Netherlands) Future Cup: 7

2010, 2012, 2014, 2017, 2018, 2024, 2025

- (Netherlands) Otten Cup: 7

1957, 1985, 1986, 1989, 1992, 1997, 1999

- (Netherlands) Eurovoetbal: 4

1979, 1984, 1994, 1999

- (Netherlands) Terborg Tournament: 3

1994, 1999, 2009

- (Netherlands) Marveld Tournament: 3

1998, 2003, 2004

- (Netherlands) Wessels Tournament: 3

2004, 2010, 2011

- (Netherlands) Vaarseveld Tournament: 1

2017

- (Netherlands) Amsterdam Youth Indoor Tournament: 1

2015

- (Hong Kong) HKFC International Soccer Sevens Main Tournament: Shield winners

2010

== Baseball ==
=== National championship ===
- Honkbal Hoofdklasse : 4

1924, 1928, 1942, 1948

== eSports ==
=== National championship ===
- eDivisie : 3

2016–17, 2017–18, 2020–21

=== International Tournaments ===
- FC Pro 24 Open: 1

2023–24

== Club awards ==
=== Professional level ===
- World Team of the Year: 1

1995

- European Team of the Year: 4

1969, 1971, 1972, 1973

- Dutch Sports Team of the Year: 5

1968, 1969, 1972, 1987, 1995

- Sports Team of the Year: 1

1990

- Dick van Rijn Trophy: 1

1995

- Amsterdam Sportsteam of the year: 3

2011, 2013, 2014

- ING Fair Play Award: 2

2013, 2014

- Fair Play Cup: 1

1995

- FIFA Club of the Century: 5th place

20th Century

- kicker Sportmagazin Club of the Century: 2nd place

20th Century

- Best Dutch club after 50 years of professional football: 1

2004

- VVCS Best Pitch of the Year: 1

2012

- Football shirt of the Year: Ajax away shirt by adidas

2013–14

- The Four-Four-Two Greatest Club Side Ever: Ajax (1965 – 1973)

2013

=== Youth levels ===
- Best youth development in Dutch professional football: 4

2004, 2005, 2006 2019

- Città dei Ciclopi: 1

2010
