= 1891–92 Netherlands Football League Championship =

Netherl. Football Championship
- Season: 1891–92
- Champions: RAP (1st title)

The Netherlands Football League Championship 1891–1892 was contested by six teams from the cities Amsterdam, The Hague, Haarlem and Rotterdam. The teams participated in the competition that would later be called Eerste Klasse West. But since the western football district of the Netherlands was the only one to have a competition at the time, it could be regarded as a national championship. RAP won the championship.

== New entrants ==
- Victoria Rotterdam
- VVA returned after one season of absence
- RC en VV Rotterdam was the result of a merger between last seasons competitors Olympia Rotterdam and Concordia

== League standings ==
Pos	Team	Pld	W	D	L	GF	GA	GD	Pts	Qualification
1	RAP	9	8	0	1	45	9	+36	16	
2	RC en VV Rotterdam	9	5	2	2	30	12	+18	12	
3	Koninklijke HFC	9	3	2	4	29	22	+7	8	
4	HVV Den Haag	9	3	2	4	13	14	−1	8	
5	Victoria Rotterdam	9	2	1	6	12	35	−23	5	
6	VVA	5	0	1	4	4	41	−37	1	Withdrew mid-season

Source: rsssf.com
