= 1917–18 Netherlands Football League Championship =

Netherl. Football Championship
- Season: 1917–1918
- Champions: Ajax (1st title)

The Netherlands Football League Championship 1917–1918 was contested by 51 teams participating in five divisions. The national champion would be determined by a play-off featuring the winners of the eastern, northern, southern and two western football divisions of the Netherlands. AFC Ajax won this year's championship by beating Go Ahead, Willem II, AFC and Be Quick 1887.

== New entrants ==
Eerste Klasse East:

- Promoted from 2nd Division: EFC PW 1885 (returning after three seasons of absence)

Eerste Klasse North:

- Promoted from 2nd Division: HSC

Eerste Klasse South:

- Promoted from 2nd Division: HVV Helmond

Eerste Klasse West-A:

- Promoted from 2nd Division: AFC Ajax (returning after three seasons of absence)

Eerste Klasse West-B: (new division)

- Feijenoord
- AFC
- Amstel
- VV Concordia
- De Spartaan
- Dordrecht
- DVS Rotterdam
- Hermes DVS
- HVV 't Gooi
- RFC Rotterdam
- SVV
- VVA

== Divisions ==
=== Eerste Klasse East ===
Pos	Team	Pld	W	D	L	GF	GA	GD	Pts	Qualification or relegation
1	Go Ahead	18	14	3	1	48	13	+35	31	Qualified for Championship play-offs
2	Be Quick Zutphen	18	9	6	3	33	20	+13	24	
3	HVV Tubantia	18	7	9	2	34	19	+15	23	
4	Quick Nijmegen	18	10	2	6	36	18	+18	22	
5	EFC PW 1885	18	7	3	8	36	27	+9	17	
6	Koninklijke UD	18	6	5	7	34	32	+2	17	
7	SC Enschede	18	6	2	10	27	44	−17	14	
8	Vitesse Arnhem	18	6	2	10	23	43	−20	14	
9	GVC Wageningen	18	4	5	9	20	42	−22	13	
10	Robur et Velocitas	18	2	1	15	16	49	−33	5	Relegated to 2nd Division

Source: rsssf.com

=== Eerste Klasse North ===
Pos	Team	Pld	W	D	L	GF	GA	GD	Pts	Qualification
1	Be Quick 1887	14	12	1	1	61	12	+49	25	Qualified for Championship play-offs
2	Velocitas 1897	14	10	1	3	57	27	+30	21	
3	LAC Frisia 1883	13	6	1	6	37	28	+9	13	
4	WVV Winschoten	14	6	2	6	22	25	−3	14	
5	HSC	14	5	0	9	15	42	−27	10	
6	Achilles 1894	14	5	1	8	30	49	−19	11	
7	GSAVV Forward	14	2	2	10	21	54	−33	6	
8	Veendam	13	4	2	7	24	30	−6	4 (Note: 6 points deducted)	

Source: rsssf.com

=== Eerste Klasse South ===
Pos	Team	Pld	W	D	L	GF	GA	GD	Pts	Qualification or relegation
1	Willem II	16	13	2	1	39	14	+25	28	Qualified for Championship play-offs
2	NAC	16	9	5	2	40	17	+23	23	
3	MVV Maastricht	16	11	1	4	32	23	+9	23	
4	CVV Velocitas	16	8	1	7	29	24	+5	17	
5	RKVV Wilhelmina	16	5	5	6	18	16	+2	15	
6	Zeelandia Middelburg	16	2	6	8	16	26	−10	10	
7	VVV Venlo	16	3	4	9	19	35	−16	10	
8	HVV Helmond	16	3	4	9	24	47	−23	10	
9	MSV Maastricht	16	3	2	11	16	31	−15	8	Relegated to 2nd Division

Source: rsssf.com

=== Eerste Klasse West-A ===
Pos	Team	Pld	W	D	L	GF	GA	GD	Pts	Qualification
1	AFC Ajax	22	14	5	3	58	20	+38	33	Qualified for Championship play-offs
2	HFC Haarlem	22	13	2	7	50	28	+22	28	
3	Blauw-Wit Amsterdam	22	12	4	6	35	23	+12	28	
4	Sparta Rotterdam	22	11	3	8	47	26	+21	25	
5	USV Hercules	22	11	3	8	32	31	+1	25	
6	HVV Den Haag	22	10	2	10	41	39	+2	22	
7	UVV Utrecht	22	10	2	10	45	45	0	22	
8	DFC	22	7	4	11	33	42	−9	18	
9	Koninklijke HFC	22	7	3	12	32	36	−4	17	
10	HBS Craeyenhout	22	7	3	12	36	71	−35	17	
11	VOC	22	5	6	11	24	44	−20	16	
12	Quick (H)	22	5	3	14	16	44	−28	13	

Source: rsssf.com

=== Eerste Klasse West-B ===
Pos	Team	Pld	W	D	L	GF	GA	GD	Pts	Qualification or relegation
1	AFC	22	12	7	3	37	16	+21	31	Qualified for Championship play-offs
2	De Spartaan	22	12	7	3	36	19	+17	31	
3	Feijenoord	22	10	4	8	31	30	+1	24	
4	HVV 't Gooi	22	10	3	9	32	28	+4	23	
5	RFC	22	8	7	7	31	33	−2	23	
6	Hermes DVS	22	8	7	7	25	27	−2	23	
7	Dordrecht	22	8	6	8	29	28	+1	22	
8	DVS Rotterdam	22	7	5	10	33	40	−7	19	
9	VV Concordia	22	6	7	9	35	43	−8	19	
10	VVA Amsterdam	22	4	8	10	37	33	+4	16	
11	SVV	22	4	8	10	21	39	−18	16	
12	Amstel	22	6	5	11	21	32	−11	15 (Note: 2 points deducted)	Relegated to 2nd Division

Source: rsssf.com

=== Championship play-off ===
Pos	Team	Pld	W	D	L	GF	GA	GD	Pts	AJA	GOA	WIL	AFC	BEQ
1	AFC Ajax	8	6	1	1	16	4	+12	13		0–1	2–0	4–3	5–0
2	Go Ahead	8	4	2	2	7	4	+3	10	0–0		0–1	3–1	1–0
3	Willem II	8	4	1	3	10	10	0	9	0–3	2–0		2–0	3–2
4	AFC	8	2	1	5	11	17	−6	5	0–1	0–0	2–1		4–2
5	Be Quick 1887	8	1	1	6	9	18	−9	3	0–1	0–2	1–1	4–1	

Source: rsssf.com
