= 1889–90 Netherlands Football League Championship =

Netherl. Football Championship
- Season: 1889–1890
- Champions: Koninklijke HFC (1st title)
- Matches played: 24
- Goals scored: 60 (2.5 per match)

The Netherlands Football League Championship 1889–1890 was contested by seven teams from the cities Amsterdam, The Hague, Haarlem and Rotterdam. The teams participated in the competition that would later be called Eerste Klasse West. But since the western football district of the Netherlands was the only one to have a competition at the time, it could be regarded as a national championship. Koninklijke HFC from Haarlem won the championship, however this championship was not official, since the teams had not played an equal number of matches.

== League table ==
Pos	Team	Pld	W	D	L	GF	GA	GD	Pts	Qualification
1	Koninklijke HFC	9	4	3	2	19	14	+5	11	
2	RAP	9	4	2	3	7	5	+2	10	
3	HVV Den Haag	8	2	5	1	16	7	+9	9	
4	Olympia Rotterdam	7	2	4	1	6	6	0	8	
5	Concordia	7	2	2	3	5	7	−2	6	
6	VVA	5	0	2	3	2	8	−6	2	Not participating next season
7	Excelsior Haarlem	3	1	0	2	5	13	−8	2	Not participating next season

== Results ==
Home \ Away	CON	EXC	HFC	HVV	OLY	RAP	VVA
Concordia		–	0–1	–	3–1	0–1	1–0
Excelsior Haarlem	3–0		–	–	–	–	–
Koninklijke HFC		6–1		2–6	1–1	0–2	5–1
HVV Den Haag	1–1	7–1	1–1		0–0	0–1	–
Olympia Rotterdam	0–0	–	–	1–1		1–0	–
RAP	–	–	1–2	0–0	1–2		1–0
VVA	–	–	1–1	–	–	0–0	

Legend: Blue = home team win; Yellow = draw; Red = away team win.
