= 1888–89 Netherlands Football League Championship =

Play season of a football competition

Netherl. Football Championship
- Season: 1888–1889
- Champions: VV Concordia (1st title)
- Matches played: 17
- Goals scored: 26 (1.53 per match)

The Netherlands Football League Championship 1888–1889 was the first national football championship in the Netherlands. Seven teams from the cities Amsterdam, The Hague, Haarlem and Rotterdam participated in the competition that would later be called Eerste Klasse West. But since the western football district of the Netherlands was the only one to have a competition at the time, it could be regarded as a national championship. R.C. & F.C. Concordia from Rotterdam finished with the best record; however this was not an official championship, since the teams had not played an equal number of matches.

== League table ==
Pos	Team	Pld	W	D	L	GF	GA	GD	Pts
1	Concordia	7	5	1	1	12	2	+10	11
2	Koninklijke HFC	7	2	3	2	6	4	+2	7
3	HVV Den Haag	6	2	2	2	2	2	0	6
4	VVA	6	1	4	1	3	3	0	6
5	RAP	5	0	4	1	2	3	−1	4
6	Olympia Rotterdam	2	0	0	2	1	8	−7	0
7	Excelsior Haarlem	1	0	0	1	0	4	−4	0

== Results ==
Home \ Away	CON	EXC	HFC	HVV	OLY	RAP	VVA
Concordia		4–0	1–0	1–0	4–0	–	1–1
Excelsior Haarlem	–		–	–	–	–	–
Koninklijke HFC	–	–		1–0	4–1	–	0–0
HVV Den Haag	1–0	–	0–0		–	1–0	–
Olympia Rotterdam	–	–	–	–		–	–
RAP	–	–	1–1	0–0	–		1–1
VVA	0–1	–	1–0	–	–	0–0	

Legend: Blue = home team win; Yellow = draw; Red = away team win.
