= Mike de Geer =

Dutch football coach and former player (born 1989)

Personal information
- Date of birth: 28 December 1989 (age 36)
- Place of birth: The Hague, Netherlands
- Height: 1.74 m (5 ft 9 in)
- Position: Midfielder

Team information
- Current team: HBS Craeyenhout (head coach)

Youth career
- ADO Den Haag

Senior career*
Years	Team	Apps	(Gls)
2008–2010	ADO Den Haag	4	(0)
2011–2019	HBS Craeyenhout	215	(44)
Total		219	(44)

Managerial career
- 2024: HVV Den Haag
- 2024–2025: SVV Scheveningen
- 2025–: HBS Craeyenhout
- * Club domestic league appearances and goals

Mike de Geer (born 28 December 1989) is a Dutch football coach and former player who is head coach of Vierde Divisie club HBS Craeyenhout.

== Playing career ==
Born in The Hague, de Geer played for ADO Den Haag and HBS Craeyenhout. He was a youth player at ADO, making his senior debut in the 2008–09 season and signing a new contract with the club in March 2009, until 2012. He left the club in January 2010, in order to undergo a trial with Australian club Brisbane Roar.

In February 2018 he announced his intention to retire from playing with HBS, in order to focus on his coaching and his family. He returned to the team in March 2019, as the club was fighting relegation, after which he re-retired.

== Coaching career ==
De Geer was a coach for HBS, before becoming assistant coach to André Wetzel at HVV Den Haag in March 2023. In March 2024, he became manager of HVV. In April 2024 he was managing SVV Scheveningen.

On 9 January 2025, De Geer was appointed head coach of his former side HBS of the Vierde Divisie, succeeding Ekrem Kahya and signing a two-year contract with an option for a third season.

== Personal life ==
His father was football player and coach Boudewijn de Geer, and his great-grandfather was wartime Prime Minister Dirk Jan de Geer.

== See also ==
- De Geer
