= 1918–19 Netherlands Football League Championship =

Netherl. Football Championship
- Season: 1918–1919
- Champions: AFC Ajax (2nd title)

The Netherlands Football League Championship 1918–1919 was contested by 52 teams participating in five divisions. The national champion would be determined by a play-off featuring the winners of the eastern, northern, southern and two western football divisions of the Netherlands. AFC Ajax won this year's championship by beating Go Ahead, AFC, Be Quick 1887 and NAC.

== New entrants ==
Eerste Klasse East:

- Promoted from 2nd Division: ZAC (returning after six seasons of absence)

Eerste Klasse North:

- Promoted from 2nd Division: MVV Alcides

Eerste Klasse South:

- Promoted from 2nd Division: NOAD

Eerste Klasse West-B:

- Promoted from 2nd Division: SV Fortuna Wormerveer

== Divisions ==
=== Eerste Klasse East ===
Pos	Team	Pld	W	D	L	GF	GA	GD	Pts	Qualification or relegation
1	Go Ahead	18	15	0	3	49	16	+33	30	Qualified for Championship play-off
2	SC Enschede	18	12	5	1	42	16	+26	29	
3	Quick Nijmegen	18	11	4	3	51	19	+32	26	
4	EFC PW 1885	18	8	3	7	23	22	+1	19	
5	HVV Tubantia	18	8	2	8	26	23	+3	18	
6	Koninklijke UD	18	6	4	8	28	29	−1	16	
7	ZAC	18	6	4	8	32	47	−15	16	
8	Vitesse Arnhem	18	3	5	10	26	50	−24	11	
9	Be Quick Zutphen	18	4	2	12	19	37	−18	10	
10	GVC	18	1	3	14	15	52	−37	5	Relegated to 2nd Division

Source: rsssf.com

=== Eerste Klasse North ===
Not all matches were played owing to poor ground conditions.
Therefore, rankings were based on games played and average points, which explains why some teams are ranked higher despite having less points.

Pos	Team	Pld	W	D	L	GF	GA	GR	Pts	Qualification
1	Be Quick 1887	16	16	0	0	87	12	7.250	32	Qualified for Championship play-off
2	Velocitas 1897	16	11	3	2	49	22	2.227	25	
3	MVV Alcides	12	5	3	4	17	27	0.630	13	
4	LAC Frisia 1883	12	4	3	5	44	28	1.571	11	
5	WVV Winschoten	10	3	2	5	23	26	0.885	8	
6	GSAVV Forward	15	3	5	7	40	48	0.833	11	
7	Veendam	15	4	2	9	20	58	0.345	10	
8	Achilles 1894	14	4	1	9	35	54	0.648	9	
9	HSC	12	1	1	10	10	50	0.200	3	

Source: rsssf.com

=== Eerste Klasse South ===
Pos	Team	Pld	W	D	L	GF	GA	GD	Pts	Qualification or relegation
1	NAC	16	13	2	1	45	11	+34	28	Qualified for Championship play-off
2	Willem II	16	10	2	4	48	22	+26	22	
3	Zeelandia Middelburg	16	10	1	5	33	29	+4	21	
4	MVV Maastricht	16	5	4	7	35	27	+8	14	
5	CVV Velocitas	16	6	2	8	34	36	−2	14	
6	NOAD	16	5	3	8	23	34	−11	13	
7	VVV Venlo	16	6	1	9	18	36	−18	13	
8	RKVV Wilhelmina	16	3	4	9	16	38	−22	10	
9	HVV Helmond	16	3	3	10	21	40	−19	9	Relegated to 2nd Division

Source: rsssf.com

=== Eerste Klasse West-A ===
Pos	Team	Pld	W	D	L	GF	GA	GD	Pts	Qualification or relegation
1	AFC Ajax	22	19	3	0	70	11	+59	41	Qualified for Championship play-off
2	Blauw-Wit Amsterdam	22	13	4	5	45	27	+18	30	
3	HFC Haarlem	22	14	1	7	54	35	+19	29	
4	Sparta Rotterdam	22	11	5	6	53	33	+20	27	
5	HBS Craeyenhout	22	10	4	8	37	27	+10	24	
6	VOC	22	8	6	8	30	29	+1	22	
7	Koninklijke HFC	22	8	6	8	29	41	−12	22	
8	HVV Den Haag	22	7	7	8	45	40	+5	21	
9	UVV Utrecht	22	5	6	11	24	52	−28	16	
10	DFC	22	4	5	13	24	45	−21	13	
11	HV & CV Quick	22	2	6	14	13	45	−32	10	
12	USV Hercules	22	3	3	16	26	65	−39	9	Relegated to 2nd Division

Source: rsssf.com

=== Eerste Klasse West-B ===
The Eerste Klasse West-B would become Second Tier next season.

Pos	Team	Pld	W	D	L	GF	GA	GD	Pts	Qualification
1	AFC	22	17	3	2	58	20	+38	37	Qualified for Championship play-off. (Note: AFC moved to the Eerste Klasse West next season.)
2	VV Concordia	22	10	8	4	43	26	+17	28	Division moving to Second Tier
3	Feijenoord	22	10	7	5	53	37	+16	27	Division moving to Second Tier
4	VVA	22	11	4	7	43	36	+7	26	Division moving to Second Tier
5	HVV 't Gooi	22	8	9	5	27	18	+9	25	Division moving to Second Tier
6	SV Fortuna Wormverveer	22	10	5	7	43	35	+8	25	Division moving to Second Tier
7	De Spartaan	22	9	4	9	39	29	+10	22	Division moving to Second Tier
8	SVV	22	5	8	9	28	29	−1	18	Division moving to Second Tier
9	DVS Rotterdam	22	6	5	11	34	44	−10	17	Division moving to Second Tier
10	RFC	22	7	5	10	28	45	−17	17 (Note: 2 points deducted.)	Division moving to Second Tier
11	Hermes DVS	22	4	8	10	22	33	−11	16	Division moving to Second Tier
12	Dordrecht	22	2	0	20	10	76	−66	4	Division moving to Second Tier

Source: rsssf.com

=== Championship play-off ===
Pos	Team	Pld	W	D	L	GF	GA	GD	Pts	AJA	GOA	AFC	BEQ	NAC
1	AFC Ajax	8	5	3	0	16	6	+10	13		0–0	2–0	3–2	2–1
2	Go Ahead	8	3	3	2	12	10	+2	9	2–2		2–2	4–2	2–1
3	AFC	8	3	3	2	9	8	+1	9	1–1	1–0		2–3	2–0
4	Be Quick 1887	8	2	2	4	11	20	−9	6	0–4	1–0	0–0		2–2
5	NAC	8	1	1	6	10	14	−4	3	0–2	1–2	0–1	5–1	

Source: rsssf.com
