= Boudewijn de Geer =

Dutch footballer (1955–2024)

Personal information
- Full name: Boudewijn Ernst de Geer
- Date of birth: 24 June 1955
- Place of birth: The Hague, Netherlands
- Date of death: 27 April 2024 (aged 68)
- Position: Forward

Youth career
- 1960-1968: HVV
- 1968–1973: FC Den Haag

Senior career*
Years	Team	Apps	(Gls)
1973–1976	FC Den Haag	8	(0)
1976–1977	Haarlem	25	(4)
1977	Molde	9	(2)
1977–1979	Lillestrøm		
1979–1980	Hércules		
1980–1981	De Graafschap	33	(8)
1983	Brisbane Lions		
1983–1984	HVV		
1984–1985	HBS		

Managerial career
- 1989–1990: RCH
- 1991–1992: HBS Craeyenhout
- 1994–1997: Quick
- 1999–2001: Quick
- * Club domestic league appearances and goals

Boudewijn Ernst de Geer (24 June 1955 – 27 April 2024) was a Dutch professional football player and coach who started playing for local side HVV.

He was then snapped up by FC Den Haag, then played for HFC Haarlem, Molde, Lillestrøm, Hércules CF, De Graafschap, and Brisbane Lions. He had followed his former youth coach Huib Ruijgrok to Molde and De Graafschap. At De Graafschap, he was part of the team that achieved promotion to the Eredivisie in the 1980–81 season.

After retiring as a player, De Geer coached amateur clubs like Delfia, ADO, HBS, Blauw-Zwart and Quick and worked in the youth set-ups of Blauw Zwart, Wilhelmus, VELO and Naaldwijk.

== Personal life ==
De Geer was the grandson of politician and former Prime Minister Dirk Jan de Geer and the father of fellow footballer Mike de Geer. He died on 27 April 2024, at the age of 68.
