= De Geer family =

Walloon family

De Geer
- Dutch and Swedish noble family
- Country: Netherlands; Sweden
- Founded: 14th century

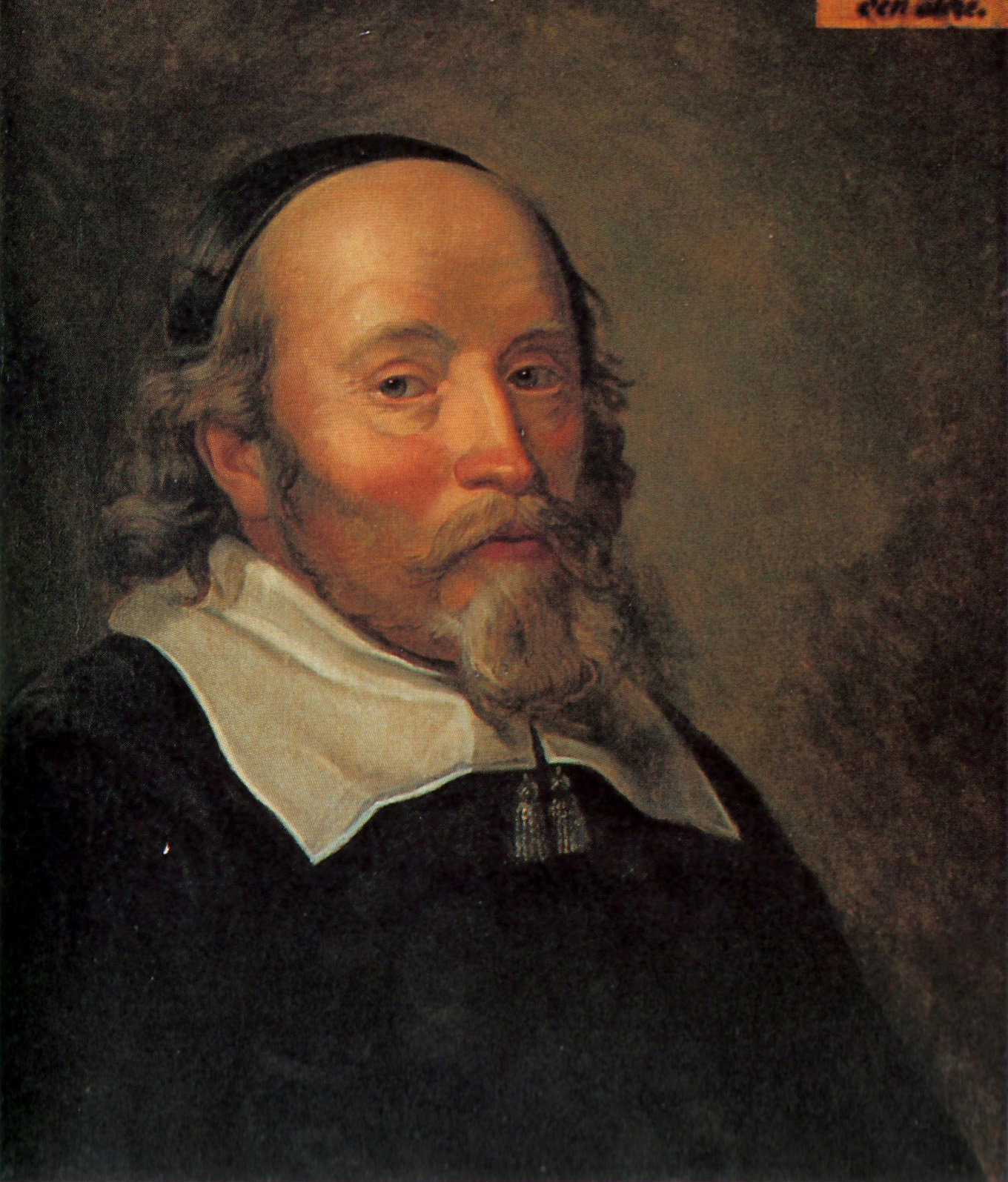
Louis De Geer portrait by David Beck.

The De Geer family (Dutch: [də ˈɣeːr], Swedish: [dœˈjæːr]; also: De Geer van Jutphaas and De Geer van Oudegein) is a prominent industrial family of Walloon origin that belongs to the Swedish and Dutch nobility.

== History ==
The name derives from the town of Geer near Liège (in present-day Belgium). The oldest known ancestor, Lambier de Geer, lord of Gaillarmont, died in 1399 in Liège, then part of the Prince-Bishopric of Liège. His descendant Louys de Geer (1535–1602) moved from Liège to Aachen and later to Dordrecht in the Dutch Republic for religious reasons. Subsequent generations became notable in Sweden and the Netherlands from the early 17th century, mainly centered on the iron-foundry company town Finspång, but often extending to science, art and national politics. The larger, Swedish branch of the family retained its contacts with the Netherlands. Some of them hold the title of baron. Both branches are still in existence.

== Notable members ==
- Louis De Geer (1587–1652), Walloon financier and industrialist, founder of the Swedish branch
- Louis De Geer (1622–1695), industrial entrepreneur
- Charles De Geer (1720–1778), Swedish entomologist
- Charles De Geer (1747–1805), Swedish politician
- Emanuel De Geer (1748–1803), Swedish Council member
- Robert Wilhelm De Geer (1750–1820), Finnish lantmarskalk of the Noble estate at the Diet of Porvoo
- Charlotta Aurora De Geer (1779–1834), Swedish salonist
- Carl De Geer (1781–1861), Swedish lantmarskalk of the Riksdag of the Estates
- Jan Lodewijk Willem de Geer van Jutphaas (1784–1857), Dutch politician
- Ulla De Geer (1793–1869), Swedish salonist
- Barthold Jacob Lintelo de Geer van Jutphaas (1816–1903), Dutch jurist and historian
- Louis Gerhard De Geer (1818–1896), Swedish statesman and writer, first ever prime minister of Sweden 1876–80
- Karl Vilhelm Konstantin De Geer (1839–1904), Finnish general in the Imperial Russian army
- Gerhard Louis De Geer (1854–1935), baron, prime minister of Sweden 1920–21
- Gerard De Geer (1858–1943), Swedish geologist
- Dirk Jan de Geer (1870-1960), prime minister of the Netherlands
- Sten De Geer (1886–1933), Swedish geographer and ethnographer
- Louis De Geer (1910–1987), Swedish diplomat
- Willem De Geer (1927–1984), Swedish artist and portrait painter. Great-grandson of Louis Gerard De Geer
- Carl Johan De Geer (born 1938), Swedish artist
- Ursul de Geer (1946–2020), Dutch actor, director and television producer
- Boudewijn de Geer (1955–2024), Dutch football player, grandson of Dirk Jan de Geer
- Jonas De Geer (born 1971), Swedish nationalist and traditionalist Catholic writer
- Mike de Geer (born 1989), Dutch football player, son of Boudewijn de Geer

== Literature ==
- Nederland's Adelsboek 83 (1993), pp. 42–86.
