= 2013 Topklasse cricket =

The 2013 SMT Shipping Topklasse season is contested between eight teams playing in one single division. Each team plays all the others in their division both home and away.
At the end of the 2013 season, HBS Craeyenhout relegated to Hoofdklasse (Dutch 2nd level cricket division). At the end of the three final matches H.V. & C.V. QUICK became the 2013 Topklasse champion with VRA being the runner-up.

Location of teams in Topklasse 2013

== Teams ==
A total of 8 teams are taking part in the league

Club	Location	Venue
ACC	Amstelveen	Sportpark 't Loopveld
Dosti CC	Amsterdam	Sportpark Drieburg
HBS	The Hague	Sportpark Craeyenhout
HCC	The Hague	Sportpark De Diepput
Hermes D.V.S.	Schiedam	Sportpark Harga
H.V. & C.V. QUICK	The Hague	Sportpark Nieuw Hanenburg
Excelsior'20	Schiedam	Sportpark Thurlede
VRA	Amstelveen	Sportpark Amsterdamse Bos

== Group stage ==
Pos	Club	Team	Pld	W	L	T	D	Pts
1	VRA	VRA 1	14	11	3	0	0	22
2	H.V. & C.V. QUICK	H.V. & C.V. QUICK 1	14	10	4	0	0	20
3	HERMES D.V.S.	HERMES D.V.S. 1	14	9	5	0	0	18
4	Excelsior '20	Excelsior '20 1	14	7	6	1	0	15
5	ACC	ACC 1	14	6	7	1	0	13
6	HCC	HCC 1	14	5	9	0	0	10
7	Dosti CC	Dosti CC 1	14	4	10	0	0	8
8	HBS	HBS 1	14	3	11	0	0	6

Last updated 29 July 2013.

Color legend

Color	Significance
	Qualifies for the final play-off stage
	Takes part in the relegation play-off stage

=== May ===
4 May
Scorecard

VRA 1 (H); 219/2 (42 overs)	v	HCC 1; 218/4 (50 overs)

VRA won by 8 wickets
Sportpark Amsterdamse Bos, Amstelveen

4 May
Scorecard

HERMES D.V.S. 1 (H); 255 (49.5 overs)	v	ACC 1; 183 (42.4 overs)

HERMES won by 72 runs
Sportpark Harga, Schiedam

5 May
Scorecard

Dosti CC 1 (H); 217 (41.3 overs)	v	Excelsior'20 1; 267/4 (50 overs)

Excelsior won by 50 runs
Sportpark Drieburg, Amsterdam

5 May
Scorecard

HBS 1 (H); 168 (39.5 overs)	v	H.V. & C.V. QUICK 1; 226 (50 overs)

Quick Haag won by 58 runs
Sportpark Craeyenhout, The Hague

9 May
Scorecard

VRA 1 (H); 176 (49.5 overs)	v	HBS 1; 147 (38.3 overs)

VRA won by 29 runs
Sportpark Amsterdamse Bos, Amstelveen

9 May
Scorecard

Excelsior'20 1 (H); 219/9 (50 overs)	v	HERMES D.V.S. 1; 149 (42 overs)

Excelsior won by 70 runs
Sportpark Thurlede, Schiedam

9 May
Scorecard

H.V. & C.V. QUICK 1 (H); 343/7 (50 overs)	v	Dosti CC 1; 346/7 (50 overs)

Dosti won by 3 wickets
Sportpark Nieuw Hanenburg, The Hague

9 May
Scorecard

ACC 1 (H); 259/4 (50 overs)	v	HCC 1; 172 (40.3 overs)

ACC won by 87 runs
Sportpark 't Loopveld, Amstelveen

11 May
Scorecard

HBS 1 (H); 288/7 (48 overs)	v	HCC 1; 285/8 (47 overs)

HCC won by 2 wickets
Sportpark Craeyenhout, The Hague

11 May
Scorecard

HERMES D.V.S. 1 (H); 138 (34.4 overs)	v	H.V. & C.V. QUICK 1; 139/0 (18.5 overs)

Quick Haag won by 10 wickets
Sportpark Harga, Schiedam

12 May
Scorecard

ACC 1 (H); 163 (49.4 overs)	v	Excelsior'20 1; 163 (42 overs)

Match tied
Sportpark 't Loopveld, Amstelveen

12 May
Scorecard

Dosti CC 1 (H); 97 (34.5 overs)	v	VRA 1; 98/2 (16 overs)

VRA won by 8 wickets
Sportpark Drieburg, Amsterdam

18 May
Scorecard

H.V. & C.V. QUICK 1 (H); 184/5 (48.1 overs)	v	ACC 1; 180 (49.1 overs)

Quick Haag won by 5 wickets
Sportpark Nieuw Hanenburg, The Hague

18 May
Scorecard

HCC 1 (H); 187/8 (43 overs)	v	Excelsior'20 1; 188/2 (29.2 overs)

Excelsior won by 8 wickets
Sportpark De Diepput, The Hague

18 May
Scorecard

VRA 1 (H); 151 (41.4 overs)	v	HERMES D.V.S. 1; 161/8 (42 overs)

Hermes won by 10 runs
Sportpark Amsterdamse Bos, Amstelveen

18 May
Scorecard

HBS 1 (H); 269 (48 overs)	v	Dosti CC 1; 211 (43 overs)

HBS won by 58 runs
Sportpark Craeyenhout, The Hague

25 May
Scorecard

HERMES D.V.S. 1 (H); 174 (48.5 overs)	v	HBS 1; 196 (50 overs)

HBS won by 22 runs
Sportpark Harga, Schiedam

25 May
Scorecard

ACC 1 (H); 183 (46 overs)	v	VRA 1; 184/3 (45 overs)

VRA won by 7 wickets
Sportpark 't Loopveld, Amstelveen

25 May
Scorecard

Excelsior'20 1 (H); 180 (45.5 overs)	v	H.V. & C.V. QUICK 1; 251/7 (50 overs)

Quick Haag won by 71 runs
Sportpark Thurlede, Schiedam

26 May
Scorecard

Dosti CC 1 (H); 196/6 (44.2 overs)	v	HCC 1; 193/7 (49 overs)

Dosti won by 4 wickets
Sportpark Drieburg, Amsterdam

=== June ===
1 June
Scorecard

Dosti CC 1 (H); 100 (34.1 overs)	v	HERMES D.V.S. 1; 189/9 (50 overs)

Hermes won by 89 runs
Sportpark Drieburg, Amsterdam

1 June
Scorecard

Excelsior'20 1 (H); 118 (35.4 overs)	v	VRA 1; 119/2 (19.5 overs)

VRA won by 8 wickets
Sportpark Thurlede, Schiedam

1 June
Scorecard

HBS 1 (H); 146 (45 overs)	v	ACC 1; 136 (40 overs)

HBS won by 10 runs
Sportpark Craeyenhout, The Hague

2 June
Scorecard

HCC 1 (H); 160 (48.2 overs)	v	H.V. & C.V. QUICK 1; 163/5 (37.5 overs)

Quick Haag won by 5 wickets
Sportpark De Diepput, The Hague

8 June
Scorecard

Excelsior'20 1 (H); 234/4 (50 overs)	v	HBS 1; 126 (33 overs)

Excelsior won by 108 runs
Sportpark Thurlede, Schiedam

8 June
Scorecard

H.V. & C.V. QUICK 1 (H); 297/6 (50 overs)	v	VRA 1; 201 (36.2 overs)

Quick Haag won by 96 runs
Sportpark Nieuw Hanenburg, The Hague

8 June
Scorecard

ACC 1 (H); 255/5 (50 overs)	v	Dosti CC 1; 144 (38.1 overs)

ACC won by 111 runs
Sportpark 't Loopveld, Amstelveen

8 June
Scorecard

HERMES D.V.S. 1 (H); 108 (29.3 overs)	v	HCC 1; 109/1 (12.3 overs)

HCC won by 9 wickets
Sportpark Harga, Schiedam

16 June
Scorecard

H.V. & C.V. QUICK 1 (H); 142/6 (33.4 overs)	v	HBS 1; 138 (43.2 overs)

Quick Haag won by 4 wickets
Sportpark Nieuw Hanenburg, The Hague

22 June
Scorecard

Excelsior'20 1 (H); 150/6 (28 overs)	v	Dosti CC 1; 151/3 (26.3 overs)

Dosti won by 7 wickets (D/L method)
Sportpark Thurlede, Schiedam

22 June
Scorecard

ACC 1 (H): (0 overs)	v	HERMES D.V.S. 1: (0 overs)

Match abandoned due to rain (to be rescheduled)
Sportpark 't Loopveld, Amstelveen

22 June
Scorecard

HCC 1 (H): (0 overs)	v	VRA 1: (0 overs)

Match abandoned due to rain (to be rescheduled)
Sportpark De Diepput, The Hague

23 June
Scorecard

HBS 1 (H); 191 (0 overs)	v	VRA 1; 267/8 (50 overs)

VRA won by 76 runs
Sportpark Craeyenhout, The Hague

23 June
Scorecard

HERMES D.V.S. 1 (H); 232/7 (41 overs)	v	Excelsior'20 1; 202 (39.4 overs)

Hermes won by 30 runs
Sportpark Harga, Schiedam

23 June
Scorecard

Dosti CC 1 (H); 152 (34.5 overs)	v	H.V. & C.V. QUICK 1; 323/4 (50 overs)

Quick Haag won by 171 runs
Sportpark Drieburg, Amsterdam

23 June
Scorecard

HCC 1 (H); 156/8 (28 overs)	v	ACC 1; 162/6 (28 overs)

ACC won by 4 wickets
Sportpark De Diepput, The Hague

30 June
Scorecard

VRA 1 (H); 163/9 (38.3 overs)	v	Dosti CC 1; 161/9 (50 overs)

VRA won by 1 wicket
Sportpark Amsterdamse Bos, Amsterdam

30 June
Scorecard

HCC 1 (H); 187/6 (45 overs)	v	HBS 1; 186 (47 overs)

HCC won by 4 wickets
Sportpark De Diepput, The Hague

30 June
Scorecard

H.V. & C.V. QUICK 1 (H); 144/8 (49.4 overs)	v	HERMES D.V.S. 1; 143 (47.3 overs)

Quick Haag won by 2 wickets
Sportpark Nieuw Hanenburg, The Hague

30 June
Scorecard

Excelsior'20 1 (H); 198 (50 overs)	v	ACC 1; 201/6 (44.1 overs)

ACC won by wickets
Sportpark Thurlede, Schiedam

=== July ===
7 July
Scorecard

Dosti CC 1 (H); 195/8 (49 overs)	v	HBS 1; 194 (50 overs)

Dosti won by 2 wickets
Sportpark Drieburg, Amsterdam

7 July
Scorecard

Excelsior'20 1 (H); 199/8 (50 overs)	v	HCC 1; 198 (49.3 overs)

Excelsior won by 2 wickets
Sportpark Thurlede, Schiedam

13 July
Scorecard

HERMES D.V.S. 1 (H); 201/6 (49.2 overs)	v	VRA 1; 198 (46.3 overs)

Hermes won by 4 wickets
Sportpark Harga, Schiedam

13 July
Scorecard

ACC 1 (H); 133 (41.1 overs)	v	H.V. & C.V. QUICK 1; 136/1 (32.1 overs)

Quick Haag won by 9 wickets
Sportpark 't Loopveld, Amstelveen

14 July
Scorecard

HBS 1 (H); 86 (32.4 overs)	v	HERMES D.V.S. 1; 88/2 (20.4 overs)

Hermes won by 8 wickets
Sportpark Craeyenhout, The Hague

14 July
Scorecard

VRA 1 (H); 224/0 (39 overs)	v	ACC 1; 220/5 (50 overs)

VRA won by 10 wickets
Sportpark Amsterdamse Bos, Amsterdam

14 July
Scorecard

HCC 1 (H); 102/4 (29.5 overs)	v	Dosti CC 1; 101 (32 overs)

HCC won by 6 wickets
Sportpark De Diepput, The Hague

14 July
Scorecard

H.V. & C.V. QUICK 1 (H); 206 (38.4 overs)	v	Excelsior'20 1; 300 (49.4 overs)

Excelsior won by 94 runs
Sportpark Nieuw Hanenburg, The Hague

21 July
Scorecard

VRA 1 (H); 226/3 (42.4 overs)	v	Excelsior'20 1; 222/8 (50 overs)

VRA won by 7 wickets
Sportpark Amsterdamse Bos, Amsterdam

21 July
Scorecard

ACC 1 (H); 164/6 (41.1 overs)	v	HBS 1; 163 (49 overs)

ACC won by 4 wickets
Sportpark 't Loopveld, Amstelveen

21 July
Scorecard

HERMES D.V.S. 1 (H); 148/4 (34.2 overs)	v	Dosti CC 1; 147 (45.2 overs)

Hermes won by 6 wickets
Sportpark Harga, Schiedam

21 July
Scorecard

H.V. & C.V. QUICK 1 (H); 175 (46.1 overs)	v	HCC 1; 176/3 (44.3 overs)

HCC won by 7 wickets
Sportpark Nieuw Hanenburg, The Hague

27 July
Scorecard

ACC 1 (H); 152 (33.5 overs)	v	HERMES D.V.S. 1; 149/6 (35 overs)

Rescheduled match; Hermes won by 12 runs (D/L method)
Sportpark 't Loopveld, Amstelveen

27 July
Scorecard

HCC 1 (H); 212 (29 overs)	v	VRA 1; 196/9 (29 overs)

Rescheduled match; VRA won by 16 runs
Sportpark De Diepput, The Hague

28 July
Scorecard

HCC 1 (H); 161 (44.2 overs)	v	HERMES D.V.S. 1; 207/8 (50 overs)

Hermes won by 46 runs
Sportpark De Diepput, The Hague

28 July
Scorecard

Dosti CC 1 (H); 155 (42.1 overs)	v	ACC 1; 279/4 (50 overs)

ACC won by 124 runs
Sportpark Drieburg, Amsterdam

28 July
Scorecard

VRA 1 (H); 174/5 (44.4 overs)	v	H.V. & C.V. QUICK 1; 172 (47.2 overs)

VRA won by 5 wickets
Sportpark Amsterdamse Bos, Amsterdam

28 July
Scorecard

HBS 1 (H); 217 (48.1 overs)	v	Excelsior'20 1; 223/4 (24.3 overs)

Excelsior won by 6 wickets
Sportpark Craeyenhout, The Hague

== Play-off stage ==
=== Championship play-offs ===
Pos	Club	Team	Pld	W	L	T	D	Pts
1	H.V. & C.V. QUICK	H.V. & C.V. QUICK 1	17	12	5	0	0	24
2	VRA	VRA 1	17	12	5	0	0	24
3	HERMES D.V.S.	HERMES D.V.S. 1	17	10	7	0	0	20
4	Excelsior '20	Excelsior '20 1	17	9	7	1	0	19

4 August
Scorecard

H.V. & C.V. QUICK 1; 170 (45.5 overs)	v	Excelsior'20 1; 171/6 (44.4 overs)

Excelsior won by 4 wickets
Sportpark Nieuw Hanenburg, The Hague

4 August
Scorecard

VRA 1; 366 (50 overs)	v	HERMES D.V.S. 1; 273 (46.5 overs)

VRA won by 93 runs
Sportpark Amsterdamse Bos, Amsterdam

18 August
Scorecard

Excelsior'20 1; 169/8 (43 overs)	v	HERMES D.V.S. 1; 173/6 (42.3 overs)

Hermes won by 4 wickets
Sportpark Thurlede, Schiedam

18 August
Scorecard

H.V. & C.V. QUICK 1; 240/4 (46.2 overs)	v	VRA 1; 238/9 (49 overs)

Quick Haag won by 6 wickets
Sportpark Nieuw Hanenburg, The Hague

25 August
Scorecard

HERMES D.V.S. 1; 206/6 (50 overs)	v	H.V. & C.V. QUICK 1; 207/6 (47.1 overs)

Quick Haag won by 4 wickets
Sportpark Harga, Schiedam

25 August
Scorecard

VRA 1; 122 (35.2 overs)	v	Excelsior'20 1; 199/7 (50 overs)

Excelsior won by 77 runs
Sportpark Amsterdamse Bos, Amsterdam

=== Relegation play-offs ===
Pos	Club	Team	Pld	W	L	T	D	Pts
5	HCC	HCC 1	17	8	9	0	0	16
6	ACC	ACC 1	17	7	9	1	0	15
7	Dosti CC	Dosti CC 1	17	5	12	0	0	10
8	HBS	HBS 1	17	4	13	0	0	8

4 August
Scorecard

ACC 1; 193/5 (41.3 overs)	v	HBS 1; 189 (48.3 overs)

ACC won by 5 wickets
Sportpark 't Loopveld, Amstelveen

4 August
Scorecard

HCC 1; 228/5 (48.1 overs)	v	Dosti CC 1; 227/8 (50 overs)

HCC won by 5 wickets
Sportpark De Diepput, The Hague

18 August
Scorecard

Dosti CC 1; 181/9 (48 overs)	v	ACC 1; 180 (49 overs)

Dosti won by 1 wicket
Sportpark Drieburg, Amsterdam

18 August
Scorecard

HCC 1; 222/9 (50 overs)	v	HBS 1; 155 (38 overs)

HCC won by 47 runs
Sportpark De Diepput, The Hague

25 August
Scorecard

HBS 1; 207/3 (26.4 overs)	v	Dosti CC 1; 206 (44.1 overs)

HBS won by 7 wickets
Sportpark Craeyenhout, The Hague

25 August
Scorecard

ACC 1; 154 (39.1 overs)	v	HCC 1; 245/8 (50 overs)

HCC won by 91 runs
Sportpark 't Loopveld, Amstelveen

== Best-of-three championship final ==
1 September
Scorecard

VRA 1; 243/9 (50 overs)	v	H.V. & C.V. QUICK 1; 245/7 (49.1 overs)

Quick Haag won by 3 wickets
Sportpark Amsterdamse Bos, Amsterdam

7 September
Scorecard

H.V. & C.V. QUICK 1; 197 (40.4 overs)	v	VRA 1; 273 (49 overs)

VRA won by 76 runs
Sportpark Nieuw Hanenburg, The Hague

8 September
Scorecard

H.V. & C.V. QUICK 1; 221/8 (38/38 overs)	v	VRA 1; 123 (28.3/38 overs)

Quick Haag won by 98 runs
Sportpark Nieuw Hanenburg, The Hague
