= 1890–91 Netherlands Football League Championship =

Netherl. Football Championship
- Season: 1890–91
- Champions: HVV Den Haag (1st title)
- Matches played: 20
- Goals scored: 53 (2.65 per match)

The Netherlands Football League Championship 1890–1891 was contested by five teams from the cities Amsterdam, The Hague, Haarlem and Rotterdam. The teams participated in the competition that would later be called Eerste Klasse West. But since the western football district of the Netherlands was the only one to have a competition at the time, it could be regarded as a national championship, making it the first proper football league in Continental Europe. HVV Den Haag from The Hague won the championship, it was considered to be the first official one, since it was the first season in which all teams played an equal number of matches.

== League table ==
Pos	Team	Pld	W	D	L	GF	GA	GD	Pts	Qualification
1	HVV Den Haag	8	6	1	1	17	3	+14	13	
2	Koninklijke HFC	8	4	2	2	18	11	+7	10	
3	RAP	8	2	5	1	10	7	+3	9	
4	Olympia Rotterdam	8	2	2	4	7	22	−15	6	Merged to form RC en VV Rotterdam
5	Concordia	8	0	2	6	1	10	−9	2	Merged to form RC en VV Rotterdam

Source: rsssf.com

== Results ==
Home \ Away	CON	HFC	HVV	OLY	RAP
Concordia		0–2	0–1	0–1	1–1
Koninklijke HFC	0–0		1–0	9–0	1–1
HVV Den Haag	2–0	5–0		3–0	1–1
Olympia Rotterdam	1–0	2–4	1–4		1–1
RAP	2–0	3–1	0–1	1–1	

Legend: Blue = home team win; Yellow = draw; Red = away team win.
