= Eredivisie =

Dutch football league

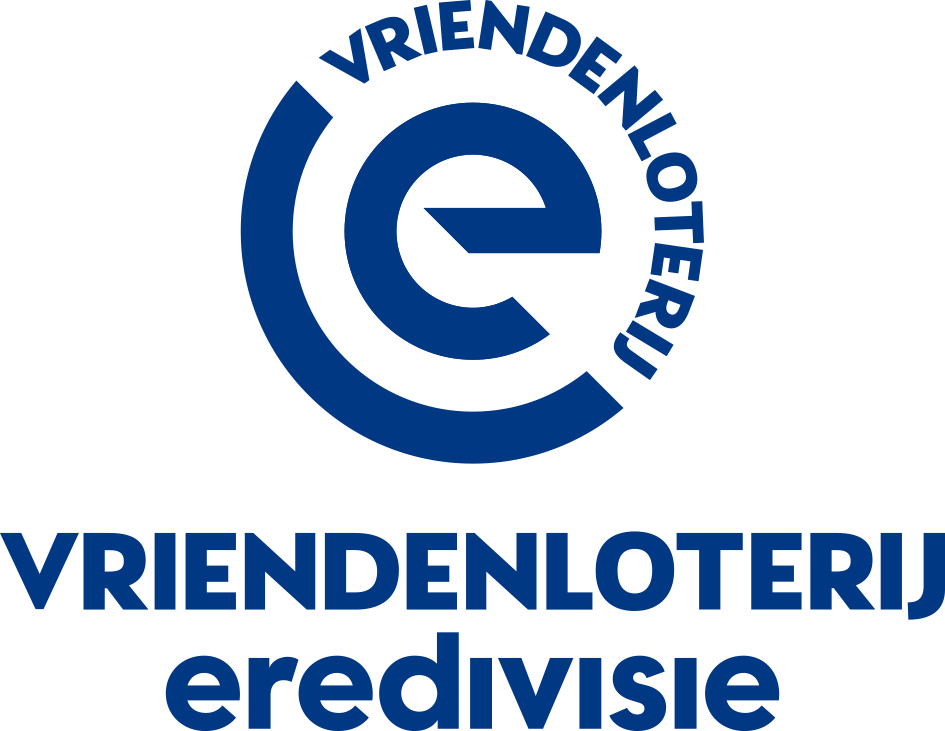
- Founded: 1956; 70 years ago
- Country: Netherlands
- Confederation: UEFA
- Chief executive officer: Jan de Jong
- Number of clubs: 18 (since 1966–67)
- Level on pyramid: 1
- Relegation to: Eerste Divisie
- Domestic cups: KNVB Cup; Johan Cruyff Shield
- International cups: UEFA Champions League; UEFA Europa League; UEFA Conference League
- Current champions: PSV (27th title) (2025–26)
- Most championships: Ajax (36 titles)
- Most appearances: Pim Doesburg (687)
- Top scorer: Willy van der Kuijlen (311)
- Broadcasters: ESPN & NOS
- Sponsor: VriendenLoterij
- Website: eredivisie.eu
- Current: 2026–27 Eredivisie

The Eredivisie (Dutch pronunciation: [ˈeːrədiˌvizi]; "Honour Division" or "Premier Division"), also known as VriendenLoterij Eredivisie for sponsorship reasons, is a professional association football league in the Netherlands and the highest level of the Dutch football league system. The league was founded in 1956, two years after the start of professional football in the Netherlands. As of the 2024–25 season, it is ranked the seventh-best league in Europe by UEFA.

The Eredivisie consists of 18 clubs. Each club meets every other club twice during the season, once at home and once away. At the end of each season, the two clubs at the bottom are relegated to the second level of the Dutch league system, the Eerste Divisie (First Division), while the champions and runners-up of the Eerste Divisie are automatically promoted to the Eredivisie. The club finishing third from the bottom of the Eredivisie goes to separate promotion/relegation play-offs with six high-placed clubs from the Eerste Divisie.

The winner of the Eredivisie claims the Dutch national championship. Ajax have won the most titles with 36. PSV Eindhoven are next with 27, and Feyenoord follow with 16. Since 1965, these three clubs have won all but three Eredivisie titles (the 1981 and 2009 titles went to AZ and Twente won in 2010). Ajax, PSV, and Feyenoord are known as the "Big Three" or "Traditional Top Three" of Dutch football. They are the only clubs in their current form to have never been relegated out of the Eredivisie. A fourth club, Utrecht, is the product of a 1970 merger between three of that city's clubs, one of which, VV DOS, had also never been relegated out of the Eredivisie.

From 1990 to 1999, the official name of the league was PTT Telecompetitie (after the sponsor, PTT Telecom), which was changed to KPN Telecompetitie (because PTT Telecom changed its name to KPN Telecom) in 1999 and to KPN Eredivisie in 2000. From 2002 to 2005, the league was called the Holland Casino Eredivisie. Since the 2005–06 season, the league has been sponsored by the Vriendenloterij (lottery), but for legal reasons its name could not be attached to the league (the Dutch government was against the name, because the Eredivisie would, after Holland Casino's sponsorship, yet again be sponsored by a company providing games of chance). From the 2025–2026 season the eredivisie will be rebranded to VriendenLoterij Eredivisie.

In August 2012, it was made public that tycoon Rupert Murdoch had secured the rights to the Eredivisie for 12 years at a cost of €1 billion, beginning in the 2013–14 season. Within this deal, the five largest Eredivisie clubs were to receive €5 million per season. In 2020, the Eredivisie was abandoned due to the COVID-19 pandemic.

== History ==
From the foundation of the Dutch national football championship in 1898 until 1954, the title was decided through play-offs by a handful of clubs who had previously won their regional league. The competition was purely an amateur one; the Royal Dutch Football Association (KNVB) rejected any form of payment and suspended players who were caught receiving salary or transfer fees. The call for professional football grew in the early fifties after many national team members left to play abroad in search for financial benefits. The KNVB would usually suspend these players, preventing them from appearing for the Dutch national team. After the North Sea flood of 1953, the Dutch players abroad (mainly playing in the French league) organised a charity match against the France national team in Paris. The match was boycotted by the KNVB, but after the assembled Dutch players defeated the French (2–1), the Dutch public witnessed the heights that could be achieved through professional football. To serve the growing interest, a dissident professional football association (the NBVB) and league were founded for the 1954–55 season. On 3 July 1954, the KNVB met with a group of concerned amateur club chairmen, who feared the best players would join the professional teams. The meeting, dubbed the slaapkamerconferentie ('bedroom conference'), led to the Association reluctantly accepting semi-professionalism.

Meanwhile, both the KNVB and the NBVB started their separate competition. The first professional football match was contested between Alkmaar and Venlo. The leagues went on for eleven rounds, before a merger was negotiated between the two federations in November. Both leagues were cancelled and a new, combined competition emerged immediately. De Graafschap, Amsterdam, Alkmaar and Fortuna '54 from the NBVB were accepted to the new league. Other clubs merged, which led to new names like Rapid J.C., Holland Sport and Roda Sport. The first (semi-)professional league was won by Willem II. For the 1956–57 season, the KNVB abandoned the regional league system. The Eredivisie was founded, in which the eighteen best clubs nationwide directly played for the league title without play-offs. The inaugural members of the Eredivisie in 1956 were Ajax, BVC, BVV, DOS, EVV, Elinkwijk, SC Enschede, Feijenoord, Fortuna '54, GVAV, MVV, NAC, NOAD, PSV, Rapid J.C., Sparta, VVV '03 and Willem II. Ajax was the first team to claim the title that season. Below is a complete record of how many teams played in each season throughout the league's history;

- 18 clubs: 1956–1962
- 16 clubs: 1962–1966
- 18 clubs: 1966–present

== Current teams (2026–27) ==
Club	City	Capacity	Position in 2025–26	1st season in Eredivisie	No. of seasons in Eredivisie	1st season of current spell	No. of seasons of current spell	Eredivisie titles	National titles	Last title
ADO Den Haag	The Hague	15,000	promoted	1957–58	48	2026–27	1	0	2	-
Ajax^{a} ^{b}	Amsterdam	55,865	5th	1956–57	71	1956–57	71	28	36	2022
AZ	Alkmaar	19,478	7th	1968–69	48	1998–99	29	2	2	2009
Cambuur	Leeuwarden	10,500	promoted	1992–93	10	2026–27	1	0	0	-
Excelsior	Rotterdam	4,500	11th	1970–71	25	2024–25	3	0	0	-
Feyenoord^{a} ^{b}	Rotterdam	51,137	2nd	1956–57	71	1956–57	71	11	16	2023
Fortuna Sittard	Sittard	10,300	10th	1968–69	28	2018–19	9	0	0	-
Go Ahead Eagles	Deventer	10,000	12th	1963–64	37	2021–22	6	0	4	1933
Groningen	Groningen	22,500	9th	1971–72	47	2024–25	3	0	0	-
Heerenveen	Heerenveen	27,224	8th	1990–91	35	1993–94	34	0	0	-
NEC	Nijmegen	12,500	3rd	1967–68	46	2021–22	6	0	0	-
PEC Zwolle	Zwolle	13,250	15th	1978–79	26	2023–24	4	0	0	-
PSV^{a} ^{b}	Eindhoven	36,500	1st	1956–57	71	1956–57	71	23	27	2026
Sparta Rotterdam^{a}	Rotterdam	11,026	11th	1956–57	61	2019–20	8	1	6	1959
Telstar	Velsen-Zuid	5,260	14th	1964–65	16	2025–26	2	0	0	-
Twente^{c}	Enschede	30,205	4th	1956–57	67	2019–20	8	1	1	2010
Utrecht^{b} ^{d}	Utrecht	23,750	6th	1970–71	57	1970–71	57	0	0	-
Willem II^{a}	Tilburg	14,700	promoted	1956–57	48	2026–27	1	0	3	1955

^{a} Founding member of the Eredivisie
^{b} Never been relegated from the Eredivisie
^{c} Founding member of the Eredivisie (as Sportclub Enschede)
^{d} Founding member of the Eredivisie (as VV DOS and USV Elinkwijk)

=== Maps ===
Locations of the 2026–27 Eredivisie teams

== Champions ==
Please note that the table below totals all winners of the Dutch top division, which included the Netherlands Football League Championship that preceded the Eredivisie. The Eredivisie was only founded in 1956 so many of these teams did not win the Eredivisie title.

Club	Winner	Runner-up	Winning years
Ajax	36	24	1917–18, 1918–19, 1930–31, 1931–32, 1933–34, 1936–37, 1938–39, 1946–47, 1956–57, 1959–60, 1965–66, 1966–67, 1967–68, 1969–70, 1971–72, 1972–73, 1976–77, 1978–79, 1979–80, 1981–82, 1982–83, 1984–85, 1989–90, 1993–94, 1994–95, 1995–96, 1997–98, 2001–02, 2003–04, 2010–11, 2011–12, 2012–13, 2013–14, 2018–19, 2020–21, 2021–22
PSV	27	16	1928–29, 1934–35, 1950–51, 1962–63, 1974–75, 1975–76, 1977–78, 1985–86, 1986–87, 1987–88, 1988–89, 1990–91, 1991–92, 1996–97, 1999–00, 2000–01, 2002–03, 2004–05, 2005–06, 2006–07, 2007–08, 2014–15, 2015–16, 2017–18, 2023–24, 2024–25, 2025–26
Feyenoord	16	22	1923–24, 1927–28, 1935–36, 1937–38, 1939–40, 1960–61, 1961–62, 1964–65, 1968–69, 1970–71, 1973–74, 1983–84, 1992–93, 1998–99, 2016–17, 2022–23
HVV Den Haag	10	1	1890–91, 1895–96, 1899–1900, 1900–01, 1901–02, 1902–03, 1904–05, 1906–07, 1909–10, 1913–14
Sparta Rotterdam	6	–	1908–09, 1910–11, 1911–12, 1912–13, 1914–15, 1958–59
RAP	5	3	1891–92, 1893–94, 1896–97, 1897–98, 1898–99
Go Ahead Eagles	4	5	1916–17, 1921–22, 1929–30, 1932–33
Koninklijke HFC	3	3	1889–90, 1892–93, 1894–95
Willem II	3	1	1915–16, 1951–52, 1954–55
HBS Craeyenhout	3	–	1903–04, 1905–06, 1924–25
AZ	2	3	1980–81, 2008–09
Heracles	2	1	1926–27, 1940–41
ADO Den Haag	2	–	1941–42, 1942–43
RCH	2	–	1922–23, 1952–53
NAC Breda	1	4	1920–21
Twente	1	3	2009–10
DWS	1	3	1963–64
Roda JC Kerkrade*	1	2	1955–56
Be Quick	1	2	1919–20
FC Eindhoven	1	2	1953–54
SC Enschede	1	1	1925–26
DOS	1	1	1957–58
Den Bosch	1	1	1947–48
De Volewijckers	1	–	1943–44
Haarlem	1	–	1945–46
Limburgia	1	–	1949–50
SVV	1	–	1948–49
Quick Den Haag	1	–	1907–08
VV Concordia	1	–	1888–89

^{*} As Rapid JC.

== Playoffs ==
=== European competition ===
Position	Playoff	Qualification to
1st	–	Champions League league phase
2nd	–	Champions League league phase
3rd	–	Champions League third qualifying round of the League Path.
4th	–	Europa League second qualifying round
5th–8th	European competition play-offs	5th vs 8th and 6th vs 7th; the two winners play each other to qualify for: UEFA Conference League second qualifying round
KNVB Cup winners	–	Europa League league phase

=== Promotion ===
Position	Playoff	What happens next
16th	Nacompetitie	The 3rd to 8th placed teams in the Keuken Kampioen Divisie compete against each other for a spot in the semi finals. The remaining 3 teams and the 16th placed team from the Eredivisie then face off in a double legged knock out system for the final place in the Eredivisie.
17th-18th	–	Direct relegation to the Keuken Kampioen Divisie

== Attendance ==
2018–19 Attendance
Club	Attendance
Ajax	52,987
Feyenoord	42,065
PSV	34,071
FC Utrecht	18,846
Heerenveen	18,743
NAC Breda	18,262
Groningen	18,025
Vitesse	15,422
AZ	15,027
PEC Zwolle	13,478
Willem II	12,998
ADO Den Haag	12,561
De Graafschap	12,321
Heracles Almelo	10,993
Fortuna Sittard	9,100
FC Emmen	8,238
VVV Venlo	6,828
Excelsior	4,223
Average	18,010

Since the beginning of the league, there have been three clubs with an attendance much higher than the others: Ajax, PSV and Feyenoord. Clubs like Heerenveen, Utrecht and Groningen also have fairly large fanbases. The regular season average league attendance was just over 7,000 in 1990, but this figure has risen sharply over the years thanks to the opening of new stadiums and the expansion of existing ones nationwide. Average attendance for the 2018–19 season was 18,010, with Ajax having the largest (52,987) and Excelsior having the smallest (4,223). Ajax's figures however differ from those provided by the Johan Cruyff Arena, since the club counts all tickets sold instead of the number of people going through the turnstiles.

== All-time ranking (since 1956) ==
Last updated following the 2024-2025 season

Playing in the Eredivisie 2025/26
Playing in the Eerste Divisie 2025/26
Playing in the amateur leagues 2025/26
Club has been disestablished or merged into another club

Rank	Club	Seasons	Played	Won	Drawn	Lost	Points	Avg. Points	Goals for	Goals against	Goal difference
1.	Ajax	69	2321	1544	418	359	5050	2,18	5881	2363	+3518
2.	PSV	69	2322	1426	486	400	4794	2,06	5429	2439	+2990
3.	Feyenoord	69	2321	1331	530	456	4527	1,95	4979	2639	+2340
4.	FC Twente	58	1960	862	525	573	3111	1,59	3140	2492	+648
5.	Sparta Rotterdam	59	1982	689	550	743	2617	1,32	2946	3070	–124
6.	FC Utrecht	55	1861	701	487	673	2590	1,39	2704	2726	–22
7.	AZ	47	1572	694	386	492	2515	1,60	2724	2130	+594
8.	Roda JC Kerkrade	44	1496	563	391	542	2080	1,39	2260	2208	+52
9.	NAC Breda	51	1722	537	449	736	2060	1,20	2273	2870	–597
10.	FC Groningen	45	1522	511	413	598	1946	1,28	2104	2344	–240
11.	ADO Den Haag	47	1574	509	404	661	1931	1,23	2226	2616	–390
12.	Vitesse	39	1318	506	363	449	1881	1,43	1971	1853	+118
13.	Willem II	47	1582	479	357	746	1794	1,13	2170	2823	–653
14.	N.E.C.	44	1496	423	423	650	1692	1,13	1764	2326	–562
15.	SC Heerenveen	33	1114	435	286	393	1591	1,43	1806	1746	+60
16.	MVV Maastricht	36	1208	350	356	502	1406	1,16	1527	1992	–465
17.	Go Ahead Eagles	35	1178	359	293	492	1370	1,16	1539	1863	–324
18.	RKC Waalwijk	29	978	284	243	451	1095	1,12	1246	1629	–383
19.	Fortuna Sittard	26	876	246	243	387	981	1,12	1034	1434	–400
20.	FC Volendam	27	910	242	228	440	954	1,05	1070	1672	–602
21.	Heracles Almelo	24	792	244	181	369	907	1,15	1058	1446	–388
22.	PEC Zwolle	24	808	222	217	369	883	1,08	1020	1402	–382
23.	VVV-Venlo	26	808	221	206	381	869	1,08	1035	1509	–474
24.	Excelsior Rotterdam	24	816	183	202	431	751	0,92	912	1543	–631
25.	HFC Haarlem	18	612	172	178	262	694	1,13	695	978	–283
26.	De Graafschap	21	714	157	175	382	646	0,90	773	1373	–600
27.	DOS	14	460	168	109	183	613	1,33	790	848	–58
28.	AFC DWS	13	430	147	117	166	558	1,30	588	644	–56
29.	Fortuna '54	12	392	141	99	152	522	1,33	635	700	–65
30.	Telstar	14	468	118	140	210	494	1,06	530	754	–224
31.	GVAV	12	392	123	115	154	484	1,23	533	595	–62
32.	FC Den Bosch	13	442	114	123	205	465	1,05	491	756	–265
33.	SC Enschede	9	294	121	77	96	440	1,50	565	490	+75
34.	SC Cambuur	9	306	65	74	167	269	0,88	337	576	–239
35.	Rapid JC	6	204	73	47	84	266	1,30	307	350	–43
36.	USV Elinkwijk	7	234	65	50	119	245	1,05	306	483	–177
37.	FC Amsterdam	6	204	61	56	87	239	1,17	263	321	–58
38.	Blauw-Wit	6	196	65	42	89	237	1,21	334	401	–67
39.	Holland Sport	4	136	37	34	65	145	1,07	168	279	–111
40.	FC Dordrecht	6	204	31	46	127	139	0,68	208	463	–255
41.	RBC Roosendaal	5	170	35	26	109	131	0,77	164	358	–194
42.	NOAD	4	136	33	30	73	129	0,95	187	311	–124
43.	FC Emmen	4	128	32	32	64	128	1,00	146	250	–104
44.	Sittardia	4	132	32	29	71	125	0,95	148	256	–108
45.	Xerxes/DHC	2	68	26	17	25	95	1,40	92	95	–3
46.	FC Eindhoven	3	102	23	25	54	94	0,92	107	209	–102
47.	BVC Amsterdam	2	68	20	20	28	80	1,18	103	130	–27
48.	BVV	2	68	18	10	40	64	0,94	126	172	–46
49.	SC Veendam	2	68	12	23	33	59	0,87	74	127	–53
50.	FC Wageningen	2	68	13	18	37	57	0,84	72	137	–65
51.	Almere City FC	2	68	11	23	34	56	0,82	56	123	–67
52.	De Volewijckers	2	64	15	10	39	55	0,86	99	189	–90
53.	Helmond Sport	2	68	12	18	38	54	0,79	93	162	–69
54.	SVV	2	68	13	13	42	52	0,76	62	142	–80
55.	Alkmaar '54	1	34	6	12	16	30	0,88	39	61	–22

== Player records ==
=== Appearances ===
Rank	Player	Apps	Playing position	First season	Last season
1	(Netherlands) Pim Doesburg	687	Goalkeeper	1962–63	1986–87
2	(Netherlands) Jan Jongbloed	684	Goalkeeper	1959–60	1985–86
3	(Netherlands) Piet Schrijvers	576	Goalkeeper	1963–64	1984–85
4	(Netherlands) Sander Boschker	562	Goalkeeper	1989–90	2012–13
5	(Netherlands) Willy van der Kuijlen	545	Forward	1964–65	1981–82
6	(Netherlands) Eddy Treijtel	542	Goalkeeper	1966–67	1984–85
7	(Netherlands) Willy van de Kerkhof	511	Midfielder	1970–71	1987–88
8	(Netherlands) Aad Mansveld	505	Defender	1964–65	1981–82
9	(Netherlands) Willem van Hanegem	494	Midfielder	1967–68	1982–83
10	(Netherlands) Leo van Veen	491	Forward	1965–66	1983–84

=== Goals ===
Rank	Player	Goals	Apps	Ratio	Playing position	First season	Last season
1	(Netherlands) Willy van der Kuijlen	311	545	0.57	Forward	1964–65	1981–82
2	(Netherlands) Ruud Geels	266	392	0.68	Forward	1964–65	1983–84
3	(Netherlands) Johan Cruijff	216	309	0.70	Forward	1964–65	1983–84
4	(Netherlands) Kees Kist	212	372	0.57	Forward	1972–73	1983–84
5	(Netherlands) Tonny van der Linden	208	456	0.46	Forward	1956–57	1966–67

== Top scorers ==
The top goalscorer of the league season is awarded the Willy van der Kuijlen Trophy since the 2020–21 season.

Last updated following the 2025–26 season.

Season	Top Scorer(s)	Goals	Club(s)
1956–57	(Netherlands) Coen Dillen	43	PSV
1957–58	(Netherlands) Leo Canjels	32	NAC
1958–59	(Netherlands) Leo Canjels (2)	34	NAC
1959–60	(Netherlands) Henk Groot	37	Ajax
1960–61	(Netherlands) Henk Groot (2)	41	Ajax
1961–62	(Netherlands) Dick Tol	27	Volendam
1962–63	(Netherlands) Pierre Kerkhoffs	22	PSV
1963–64	(Netherlands) Frans Geurtsen	28	DWS
1964–65	(Netherlands) Frans Geurtsen (2)	23	DWS
1965–66	(Netherlands) Willy van der Kuijlen (Netherlands) Piet Kruiver	23	PSV Feyenoord
1966–67	(Netherlands) Johan Cruyff	33	Ajax
1967–68	(Sweden) Ove Kindvall	28	Feyenoord
1968–69	(Netherlands) Dick van Dijk (Sweden) Ove Kindvall (2)	30	Twente Feyenoord
1969–70	(Netherlands) Willy van der Kuijlen (2)	26	PSV
1970–71	(Sweden) Ove Kindvall (3)	24	Feyenoord
1971–72	(Netherlands) Johan Cruyff (2)	25	Ajax
1972–73	(Netherlands) Cas Janssens (Netherlands) Willy Brokamp	18	NEC MVV
1973–74	(Netherlands) Willy van der Kuijlen (3)	27	PSV
1974–75	(Netherlands) Ruud Geels	30	Ajax
1975–76	(Netherlands) Ruud Geels (2)	29	Ajax
1976–77	(Netherlands) Ruud Geels (3)	34	Ajax
1977–78	(Netherlands) Ruud Geels (4)	30	Ajax
1978–79	(Netherlands) Kees Kist	34	AZ
1979–80	(Netherlands) Kees Kist (2)	27	AZ
1980–81	(Netherlands) Ruud Geels (5)	22	Sparta
1981–82	(Netherlands) Wim Kieft	32	Ajax
1982–83	(Netherlands) Peter Houtman	30	Feyenoord
1983–84	(Netherlands) Marco van Basten	28	Ajax
1984–85	(Netherlands) Marco van Basten (2)	22	Ajax
1985–86	(Netherlands) Marco van Basten (3)	37	Ajax
1986–87	(Netherlands) Marco van Basten (4)	31	Ajax
1987–88	(Netherlands) Wim Kieft (2)	29	PSV
1988–89	(Brazil) Romário	19	PSV
1989–90	(Brazil) Romário (2)	23	PSV
1990–91	(Brazil) Romário (3) (Netherlands) Dennis Bergkamp	25	PSV Ajax
1991–92	(Netherlands) Dennis Bergkamp (2)	24	Ajax
1992–93	(Netherlands) Dennis Bergkamp (3)	26	Ajax
1993–94	(Finland) Jari Litmanen	26	Ajax
1994–95	(Brazil) Ronaldo	30	PSV
1995–96	(Belgium) Luc Nilis	21	PSV
1996–97	(Belgium) Luc Nilis (2)	21	PSV
1997–98	(Greece) Nikos Machlas	34	Vitesse
1998–99	(Netherlands) Ruud van Nistelrooy	31	PSV
1999–2000	(Netherlands) Ruud van Nistelrooy (2)	29	PSV
2000–01	(Federal Republic of Yugoslavia) Mateja Kežman	24	PSV
2001–02	(Netherlands) Pierre van Hooijdonk	24	Feyenoord
2002–03	(Federal Republic of Yugoslavia) Mateja Kežman (2)	35	PSV
2003–04	(Federal Republic of Yugoslavia) Mateja Kežman (3)	31	PSV
2004–05	(Netherlands) Dirk Kuyt	29	Feyenoord
2005–06	(Netherlands) Klaas-Jan Huntelaar	33	Heerenveen/Ajax
2006–07	(Brazil) Afonso Alves	34	Heerenveen
2007–08	(Netherlands) Klaas-Jan Huntelaar (2)	33	Ajax
2008–09	(Morocco) Mounir El Hamdaoui	23	AZ
2009–10	(Uruguay) Luis Suárez	35	Ajax
2010–11	(Belgium) Björn Vleminckx	23	NEC
2011–12	(Netherlands) Bas Dost	32	Heerenveen
2012–13	(Ivory Coast) Wilfried Bony	31	Vitesse
2013–14	(Iceland) Alfreð Finnbogason	29	Heerenveen
2014–15	(Netherlands) Memphis Depay	22	PSV
2015–16	(Netherlands) Vincent Janssen	27	AZ
2016–17	(Denmark) Nicolai Jørgensen	21	Feyenoord
2017–18	(Iran) Alireza Jahanbakhsh	21	AZ
2018–19	(Netherlands) Luuk de Jong (Serbia) Dušan Tadić	28	PSV Ajax
2019–20	(Netherlands) Steven Berghuis (Belgium) Cyriel Dessers	15	Feyenoord Heracles Almelo
2020–21	(Greece) Giorgos Giakoumakis	26	VVV-Venlo
2021–22	(Ivory Coast) Sébastien Haller	21	Ajax
2022–23	(Greece) Anastasios Douvikas (Netherlands) Xavi Simons	19	Utrecht PSV
2023–24	(Netherlands) Luuk de Jong (2) (Greece) Vangelis Pavlidis	29	PSV AZ
2024–25	(Netherlands) Sem Steijn	24	Twente
2025–26	(Japan) Ayase Ueda	25	Feyenoord

== Eredivisie teams in major UEFA and FIFA competitions ==
The UEFA Super Cup was founded by a Dutch reporter named Anton Witkamp and Ajax's 1973 win was the first time the tournament was contested officially.

Table 1: International Tournament Finals featuring Eredivisie Teams

Year	Competition	Winner	Score (Ref)	Runner-up
1969	European Cup	(Italy) Milan	4–1	(Netherlands) Ajax
1970	European Cup	(Netherlands) Feyenoord	2–1 (a.e.t.)	(Scotland) Celtic
1970	1970 Intercontinental Cup	(Netherlands) Feyenoord	2–2, 1–0	(Argentina) Estudiantes
1971	European Cup	(Netherlands) Ajax	2–0	(Greece) Panathinaikos
1972	European Cup	(Netherlands) Ajax	2–0	(Italy) Inter Milan
1972	1972 Intercontinental Cup	(Netherlands) Ajax	1–1, 3–0	(Argentina) Independiente
1973	European Cup	(Netherlands) Ajax	1–0	(Italy) Juventus
1973	1973 European Super Cup	(Netherlands) Ajax	0–1, 6–0	(Italy) Milan
1974	UEFA Cup	(Netherlands) Feyenoord	2–2, 2–0	(England) Tottenham Hotspur
1975	UEFA Cup	(West Germany) Borussia Mönchengladbach	0–0, 5–1	(Netherlands) Twente
1978	UEFA Cup	(Netherlands) PSV	0–0, 3–0	(France) Bastia
1981	UEFA Cup	(England) Ipswich Town	3–0, 2–4	(Netherlands) AZ
1987	Cup Winners' Cup	(Netherlands) Ajax	1–0	(East Germany) Lokomotive Leipzig
1987	1987 European Super Cup	(Portugal) Porto	1–0, 1–0	(Netherlands) Ajax
1988	European Cup	(Netherlands) PSV	0–0 (6–5 p)	(Portugal) Benfica
1988	Cup Winners' Cup	(Belgium) Mechelen	1–0	(Netherlands) Ajax
1988	1988 Intercontinental Cup	(Uruguay) Nacional	2–2 (7–6 p)	(Netherlands) PSV
1988	1988 European Super Cup	(Belgium) Mechelen	3–0, 0–1	(Netherlands) PSV
1992	UEFA Cup	(Netherlands) Ajax	2–2, 0–0 (a)	(Italy) Torino
1995	Champions League	(Netherlands) Ajax	1–0	(Italy) Milan
1995	1995 UEFA Super Cup	(Netherlands) Ajax	1–1, 4–0	(Spain) Real Zaragoza
1995	1995 Intercontinental Cup	(Netherlands) Ajax	0–0 (4–3 p)	(Brazil) Grêmio
1996	Champions League	(Italy) Juventus	1–1 (4–2 p)	(Netherlands) Ajax
2002	UEFA Cup	(Netherlands) Feyenoord	3–2	(Germany) Borussia Dortmund
2002	2002 UEFA Super Cup	(Spain) Real Madrid	3–1	(Netherlands) Feyenoord
2017	Europa League	(England) Manchester United	2–0	(Netherlands) Ajax
2022	Conference League	(Italy) Roma	1–0	(Netherlands) Feyenoord

Table 2: Summary of Performance by Competition and Club

Club	Champions League		Europa League / UEFA Cup		Cup Winners' Cup		Super Cup		Intercontinental Cup		Conference League		Total Won	Total Lost
Club	W	L	W	L	W	L	W	L	W	L	W	L	Total Won	Total Lost
Ajax	4	2	1	1	1	1	2	1	2	0	0	0	10	5
Feyenoord	1	0	2	0	0	0	0	1	1	0	0	1	4	2
PSV	1	0	1	0	0	0	0	1	0	1	0	0	2	2
AZ	0	0	0	1	0	0	0	0	0	0	0	0	0	1
Twente	0	0	0	1	0	0	0	0	0	0	0	0	0	1
Total	6	2	4	3	1	1	2	3	3	1	0	1	16	11

Table 3: Dutch Club Managers in International Finals

Year	Club	Manager	Status
1969	Ajax	(Netherlands) Rinus Michels	Runner-up
1970	Feyenoord	(Austria) Ernst Happel	Winner
1970	Feyenoord	(Austria) Ernst Happel	Winner
1971	Ajax	(Netherlands) Rinus Michels	Winner
1972	Ajax	(Romania) Ștefan Kovács	Winner
1972	Ajax	(Romania) Ștefan Kovács	Winner
1973	Ajax	(Romania) Ștefan Kovács	Winner
1973	Ajax	(Romania) Ștefan Kovács	Winner
1974	Feyenoord	(Netherlands) Wiel Coerver	Winner
1975	Twente	(Netherlands) Spitz Kohn	Runner-up
1978	PSV	(Netherlands) Kees Rijvers	Winner
1981	AZ	(Germany) Georg Keßler	Runner-up
1987	Ajax	(Netherlands) Johan Cruyff	Winner
1987	Ajax	(Netherlands) Johan Cruyff	Runner-up
1988	PSV	(Netherlands) Guus Hiddink	Winner
1988	Ajax	(Netherlands) Barry Hulshoff	Runner-up
1988	PSV	(Netherlands) Guus Hiddink	Runner-up
1988	PSV	(Netherlands) Guus Hiddink	Runner-up
1992	Ajax	(Netherlands) Louis van Gaal	Winner
1995	Ajax	(Netherlands) Louis van Gaal	Winner
1995	Ajax	(Netherlands) Louis van Gaal	Winner
1995	Ajax	(Netherlands) Louis van Gaal	Winner
1996	Ajax	(Netherlands) Louis van Gaal	Runner-up
2002	Feyenoord	(Netherlands) Bert van Marwijk	Winner
2002	Feyenoord	(Netherlands) Bert van Marwijk	Runner-up
2017	Ajax	(Netherlands) Peter Bosz	Runner-up
2022	Feyenoord	(Netherlands) Arne Slot	Runner-up

== Sponsorship names for seasons ==
- Eredivisie (1956–1990)
- PTT-Telecompetitie (1990–1999)
- KPN-Telecompetitie (1999–2000)
- KPN Eredivisie (2000–2002)
- Holland Casino Eredivisie (2002–2005)
- VriendenLoterij Eredivisie (2025–present) (de jure) (2005–present) (de facto)

== See also ==
- Eerste Divisie
- KNVB Cup
- Johan Cruyff Shield
- List of Dutch football champions
- List of foreign players in the Eredivisie
- List of sports attendance figures – Eredivisie in a global context
