= 1913–14 Netherlands Football League Championship =

Netherl. Football Championship
- Season: 1913–1914
- Champions: HVV Den Haag (10th title)

The Netherlands Football League Championship 1913–1914 was contested by 24 teams participating in three divisions. The national champion would be determined by a play-off featuring the winners of the eastern, southern and western football division of the Netherlands. HVV Den Haag won this year's championship by beating Vitesse Arnhem and Willem II.

== New entrants ==
Eerste Klasse East:

- Robur et Velocitas

Eerste Klasse South: (new Division)

- MVV Maastricht
- VVV Venlo
- Willem II
- Bredania/'t Zesde (returning after two seasons of absence, having played in the Western Division)
- RKVV Wilhelmina (moving in from the Eastern Division)
- CVV Velocitas (moving in from the Western Division)

Eerste Klasse West:

- UVV Utrecht

== Divisions ==
=== Eerste Klasse East ===
Pos	Team	Pld	W	D	L	GF	GA	GD	Pts	Qualification
1	Vitesse	14	11	0	3	43	12	+31	22	Qualified for Championship play-off
2	HVV Tubantia	14	8	3	3	43	23	+20	19	
3	Koninklijke UD	14	7	2	5	27	24	+3	16	
4	Quick Nijmegen	14	6	2	6	31	20	+11	14	
5	Go Ahead	14	5	4	5	22	30	−8	14	
6	GVC Wageningen	14	5	3	6	22	35	−13	13	
7	Robur et Velocitas	14	4	3	7	23	35	−12	11	
8	EFC PW 1885	14	1	1	12	10	42	−32	3	Not participating next season

Source: rsssf.com

=== Eerste Klasse South ===
Teams participating in the Eerste Klasse South would not play next season due to the mobilization. The league would resume one season later.

Pos	Team	Pld	W	D	L	GF	GA	GD	Pts	Qualification
1	Willem II	10	6	3	1	35	10	+25	15	Qualified for Championship play-off
2	CVV Velocitas	10	7	1	2	30	11	+19	15	
3	MVV Maastricht	10	4	3	3	16	18	−2	11	
4	Bredania/'t Zesde	10	4	2	4	15	18	−3	10	Not participating in 1915–16
5	RKVV Wilhelmina	10	3	2	5	17	21	−4	8	
6	VVV Venlo	10	0	1	9	7	42	−35	1	

Source: rsssf.com

=== Eerste Klasse West ===
Pos	Team	Pld	W	D	L	GF	GA	GD	Pts	Qualification
1	HVV Den Haag	18	14	2	2	56	32	+24	30	Qualified for Championship play-off
2	Sparta Rotterdam	18	8	5	5	30	30	0	21	
3	HFC Haarlem	18	9	1	8	41	30	+11	19	
4	Koninklijke HFC	18	7	4	7	40	38	+2	18	
5	DFC	18	7	3	8	32	30	+2	17	
6	UVV Utrecht	18	8	1	9	24	29	−5	17	
7	VOC	18	8	0	10	28	32	−4	16	
8	HV & CV Quick	18	6	3	9	32	35	−3	15	
9	HBS Craeyenhout	18	5	5	8	31	36	−5	15	
10	AFC Ajax	18	5	2	11	22	44	−22	12	Not participating next season

Source: rsssf.com

=== Championship play-off ===
Pos	Team	Pld	W	D	L	GF	GA	GD	Pts	HVV	VIT	WIL
1	HVV Den Haag	4	3	0	1	16	6	+10	6		2–1	8–0
2	Vitesse	4	3	0	1	9	4	+5	6	4–1		1–0
3	Willem II	4	0	0	4	2	17	−15	0	1–5	1–3	

Source: rsssf.com
