= Dries Boussatta =

Dutch–Moroccan former international footballer

Personal information
- Full name: Idriss Boussatta
- Date of birth: 23 December 1972 (age 53)
- Place of birth: Amsterdam, Netherlands
- Position: Right winger

Youth career
- De Spartaan
- VVA/Spartaan
- V&V Amsterdam
- Ajax
- Volendam

Senior career*
Years	Team	Apps	(Gls)
1991–1992	Telstar	2	(0)
1992–1994	Ajax	0	(0)
1994–1995	Haarlem	23	(4)
1995–1998	Utrecht	60	(2)
1998–2002	AZ	107	(7)
2002–2003	Excelsior	11	(0)
2003–2004	Sheffield United	6	(0)
2004	Al-Shaab	5	(0)
Total		214	(13)

International career
1998–1999	Netherlands	3	(0)
2001	Morocco	2	(0)
- * Club domestic league appearances and goals

Idriss "Dries" Boussatta (born 23 December 1972) is a former international footballer who played professionally in the Netherlands, England and the United Arab Emirates as a right winger. Boussatta played friendlies for both the Netherlands and Morocco national teams.

== Club career ==
Born in Amsterdam, Boussatta played in the Netherlands for De Spartaan, VVA/Spartaan, V&V Amsterdam, Ajax, Volendam, Telstar, Haarlem, Utrecht, AZ and Excelsior. He also played in England for Sheffield United, making 6 appearances in the Football League, before ending his career in 2004 in the United Arab Emirates with Al-Shaab.

== International career ==
Boussatta earned three caps for the Netherlands between 1998 and 1999. By doing so, he "became the first Dutch-born player of Moroccan heritage to represent the Netherlands".

He also appeared in two matches for Morocco in 2001.

== Personal life ==
Boussatta is of Moroccan origin; he has publicly spoken about the discrimination his Muslim father received in the Netherlands. In 2008 Boussatta became involved with a charitable foundation in Morocco. In 2010, he owned a gym, a restaurant, and a coffee shop; he also worked as a player's agent. In 2016, he was sanctioned to court by real estate company WPM who sued him for outstanding backpayments.

In 2010, he was living in Amsterdam, and had a son and a daughter. In 2016, he owned 6 coffee bars under the Buongiorno brand.
