= Ray Julian =

English cricketer

Personal information
- Full name: Raymond Julian
- Born: 23 August 1936 (age 90); Cosby, Leicestershire, England
- Batting: Right-handed
- Role: Wicketkeeper

Domestic team information
- Years: Team
- 1953–71: Leicestershire
- First-class debut: 9 May 1953 Leicestershire v Gloucestershire
- Last First-class: 25 May 1971 Leicestershire v Gloucestershire
- List A debut: 1 May 1963 Leicestershire v Lancashire
- Last List A: 22 May 1965 Leicestershire v Yorkshire

Umpiring information
- ODIs umpired: 6 (1996–2001)
- FC umpired: 521 (1972–2001)
- LA umpired: 532 (1972–2001)

Career statistics
Competition	First-class	List A
Matches	192	3
Runs scored	2,581	6
Batting average	9.73	2.00
100s/50s	0/2	0/0
Top score	51	4
Catches/stumpings	382/40	0/–
- Source: CricketArchive (subscription required), 28 June 2013

Raymond "Ray" Julian (born 23 August 1936) is a former English cricketer who played first-class and List A cricket for Leicestershire between 1953 and 1971. He continued in cricket after his playing days were over by standing as an umpire in first-class, List A and one-day international matches between 1972 and 2001. He was born at Cosby, Leicestershire.

== Playing career ==
Julian was a right-handed lower-order batsman and a wicketkeeper. He made his first-class debut for Leicestershire as a 16-year-old in a single match against Gloucestershire in May 1953. There were a few more games, plus a period of National Service, over the next few years, but he did not displace Jack Firth as Leicestershire's first choice wicketkeeper until Firth retired at the end of the 1958 season.

From 1959 to 1965, Julian was Leicestershire's main wicketkeeper, though his indifferent batting and Leicestershire's perennially long tail in this period meant that other wicketkeepers such as John Mitten and Geoffrey Burch were tried, though not usually for long. His best season as a wicketkeeper was 1961, when he received his county cap and took 72 catches with 7 stumpings. As a batsman, he scored 561 runs in 1960 with an average of 12.46 and a highest score of just 44: the high aggregate reflects the fact that he went in at No 8 because in Terry Spencer, John Savage and Brian Boshier or Peter Broughton, there were usually three even worse batsmen than he was, and Leicestershire usually batted twice in each match. His highest score, one of only two innings over 50, was 51, made against Worcestershire in 1962 as a high-scoring match petered out to a draw.

By the mid-1960s, recruits from other countries brought in by the Leicestershire secretary, later manager, Mike Turner, such as Stanley Jayasinghe and Clive Inman and from other counties such as John Cotton and Peter Marner, helped make Leicestershire a more competitive side. Julian played regularly through to the end of the 1965 season, but for 1966 the 20-year-old Roger Tolchard, a Devonian via Malvern College, was preferred and Julian then became his deputy, appearing in only three further first-class matches to the end of the 1971 season, when he left the county staff. He had appeared in Leicestershire's first three List A matches, one each in the Gillette Cup competitions of 1963, 1964 and 1965, but all three games were lost.

== Umpiring career ==
Julian was appointed to the first-class umpires' list for England and Wales in 1972, the first season after he formally retired as a player. He remained on the list for 30 seasons until he retired at the end of the 2001 season at the compulsory retirement age of 65. He did not umpire on the field in any Test matches but was the television umpire in six Tests between 1996 and 2001 and in the same period he also stood as umpire in six one-day international matches.

== See also ==
- List of One Day International cricket umpires
