= 2014 SMT Shipping Topklasse =

The 2014 SMT Shipping Topklasse cricket season is contested between eight teams playing in one single division. The competition will take place in two phases. In Phase I the teams will play an entire competition meeting each other two times while in phase II the top four and the bottom four will meet each other one time during a half competition. The competition will end with a "best out of three" final.

As a result of the 2013 competition, VOC Rotterdam has been promoted from Hoofdklasse (Dutch 2nd level cricket division) while HBS Craeyenhout has been relegated.

Location of teams in 2014 SMT Shipping Topklasse

== Teams ==
A total of 8 teams are taking part in the league

Club	Location	Venue
ACC	Amstelveen	Sportpark 't Loopveld
Dosti CC	Amsterdam	Sportpark Drieburg
HCC	The Hague	Sportpark De Diepput
Hermes D.V.S.	Schiedam	Sportpark Harga
H.V. & C.V. QUICK	The Hague	Sportpark Nieuw Hanenburg
Excelsior'20	Schiedam	Sportpark Thurlede
VOC	Rotterdam	Sportpark Schiebroekse
VRA	Amstelveen	Sportpark Amsterdamse Bos

== Group stage ==
Pos	Club	Team	Pld	W	L	T	D	Pts
1	Dosti CC	Dosti CC 1	1	1	0	0	0	2
2	VOC	VOC 1	1	1	0	0	0	2
3	VRA	VRA 1	1	1	0	0	0	2
4	Excelsior'20	Excelsior'20 1	1	1	0	0	0	2
5	ACC	ACC 1	1	0	1	0	0	0
6	HERMES D.V.S.	HERMES D.V.S. 1	1	0	1	0	0	0
7	HCC	HCC 1	1	0	1	0	0	0
8	H.V. & C.V. QUICK	H.V. & C.V. QUICK 1	1	0	1	0	0	0

Last updated 5 May 2014.

Color legend

Color	Significance
	Qualifies for the final play-off stage
	Takes part in the relegation play-off stage

=== May ===
3 May
Scorecard

ACC 1 (H); 209 (49.3 overs)	v	Excelsior'20 1; 210/4 (50 overs)

Excelsior win by 1 run
Sportpark 't Loopveld, Amstelveen

3 May
Scorecard

VOC 1 (H); 122/6 (27.5 overs)	v	HCC 1; 121 (43 overs)

VOC win by 4 wickets
Sportpark Schiebroekse, Rotterdam

3 May
Scorecard

H.V. & C.V. QUICK 1 (H); 174 (41/43 overs)	v	Dosti CC 1; 177/3 (30.1/43 overs)

Dosti win by 7 wickets
Sportpark Nieuw Hanenburg, The Hague

3 May
Scorecard

HERMES D.V.S. 1 (H); 177 (45.4 overs)	v	VRA 1; 222 (49.3 overs)

VRA win by 45 runs
Sportpark Harga, Schiedam

10 May
Scorecard

Excelsior'20 1 (H); 0/0 (0 overs)	v	VRA 1; 0/0 (0 overs)

match abandoned due to rain
Sportpark Thurlede, Schiedam

10 May
Scorecard

HCC 1 (H); 0/0 (0 overs)	v	H.V. & C.V. QUICK 1; 0/0 (0 overs)

match abandoned due to rain
Sportpark De Diepput, The Hague

10 May
Scorecard

ACC 1 (H); 0/0 (0 overs)	v	VOC 1; 0/0 (0 overs)

match abandoned due to rain
Sportpark 't Loopveld, Amstelveen

10 May
Scorecard

Dosti CC 1 (H); 0/0 (0 overs)	v	HERMES D.V.S. 1; 0/0 (0 overs)

match abandoned due to rain
Sportpark Drieburg, Amsterdam

17 May
Scorecard

VOC 1 (H); 0/0 (0 overs)	v	Excelsior'20 1; 0/0 (0 overs)

Sportpark Schiebroekse, Rotterdam

17 May
Scorecard

H.V. & C.V. QUICK 1 (H); 0/0 (0 overs)	v	ACC 1; 0/0 (0 overs)

Sportpark Nieuw Hanenburg, The Hague

17 May
Scorecard

HERMES D.V.S. 1 (H); 0/0 (0 overs)	v	HCC 1; 0/0 (0 overs)

Sportpark Thurlede, Schiedam

17 May
Scorecard

VRA 1 (H); 0/0 (0 overs)	v	Dosti CC 1; 0/0 (0 overs)

Sportpark Amsterdamse Bos, Amstelveen
