= Gordon Coles =

English footballer

Personal information
- Full name: Frederick Gordon Coles
- Date of birth: 17 November 1875
- Place of birth: Nottingham, England
- Date of death: 22 April 1947 (aged 71)
- Position: Wing half

Senior career*
Years	Team	Apps	(Gls)
1894–1895	Nottingham Post Office		
1895–1899	Notts County	1	(0)
1899–1900	Nottingham Forest	1	(0)
1900–1904	Woolwich Arsenal	78	(2)
1904–1908	Grimsby Town	44	(0)

Managerial career
- 1908–1913: HVV Den Haag
- * Club domestic league appearances and goals

Frederick Gordon Coles (17 November 1875 – 22 April 1947) was an English professional footballer who played as a wing half.
