= Joop Campioni =

Dutch footballer

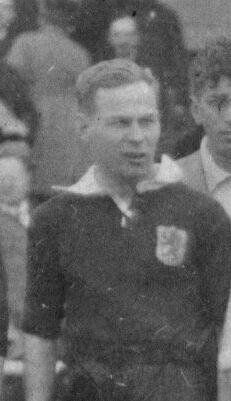
- Joop Campioni (1921)

Personal information
- Full name: Marie Johannes Jacobus Campioni
- Date of birth: 4 August 1901
- Place of birth: Roermond, Netherlands
- Date of death: 4 January 1962 (aged 60)
- Place of death: Amstelveen, Netherlands
- Position: Midfielder

Senior career*
| Years | Team | Apps | (Gls) |
| 1920-1922 | HVV Den Haag | | |

International career
| 1921 | Netherlands | 2 | (0) |
- * Club domestic league appearances and goals

Marie Johannes Jacobus "Joop" Campioni (4 August 1901, Roermond - 4 January 1962, Amstelveen) was a Dutch football player, who played for HVV Den Haag.

== International career ==
He made his debut for the Netherlands national football team on 26 March 1921, in the home game against Switzerland (2–0 victory), at the age of 19 years and 234 days. Campioni also played with the Netherlands against Italy on 8 May 1921 (2–2 draw), his second and final cap.
