= Leo Canjels =

Dutch footballer and manager

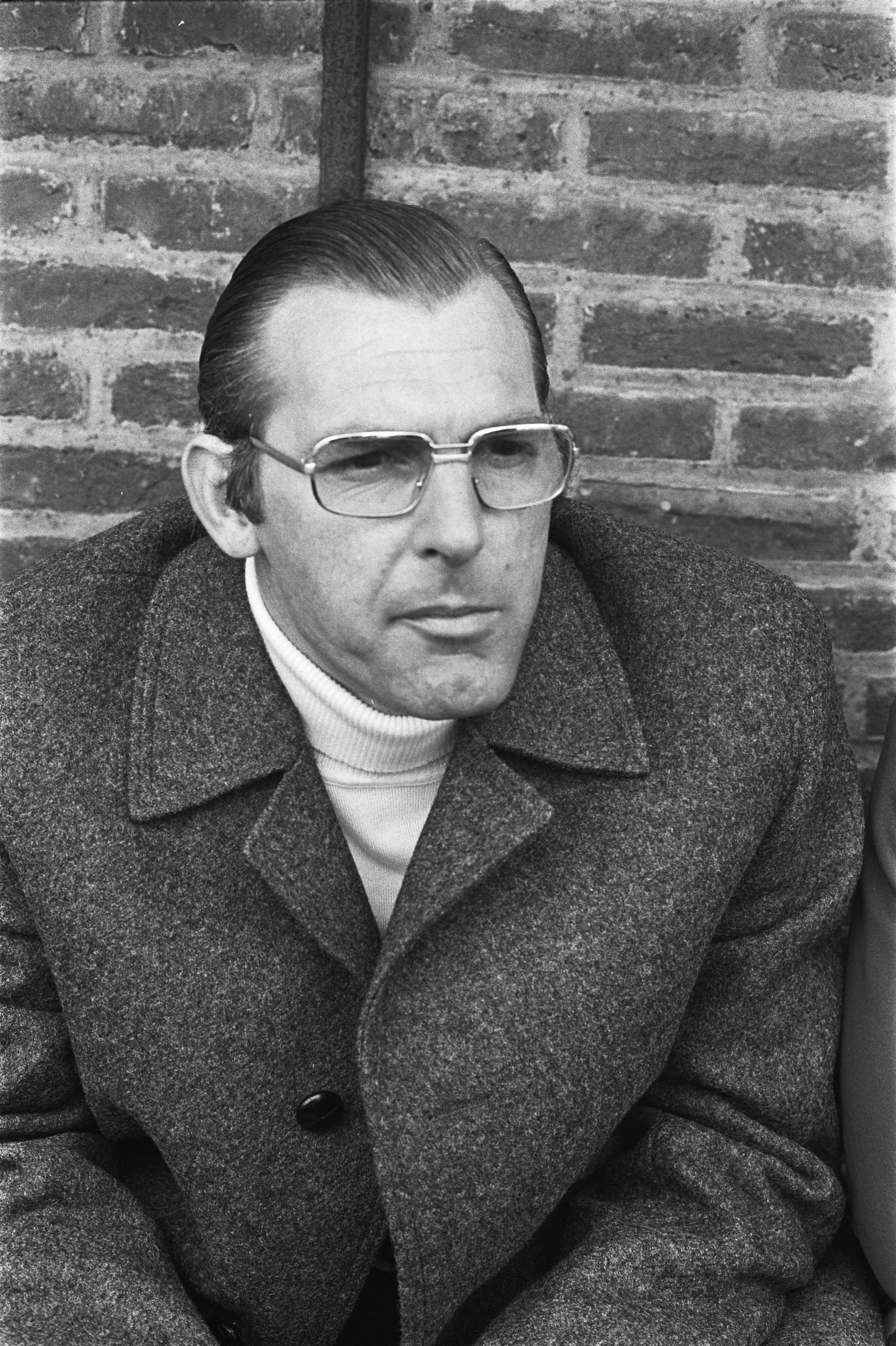
- Canjels in 1973

Personal information
- Full name: Leonard Canjels
- Date of birth: 1 April 1933
- Place of birth: Breda, Netherlands
- Date of death: 26 May 2010 (aged 77)
- Place of death: Breda, Netherlands
- Position: Striker

Senior career*
Years	Team	Apps	(Gls)
1955–1956	Baronie		
1956–1963	NAC	145	(114)
1964–1965	Baronie	6	(2)

International career
1959	Netherlands	3	(2)

Managerial career
- 1968–1971: NAC
- 1971–1973: Club Brugge
- 1973–1975: MVV
- 1975–1977: Patro Eisden
- 1977–1979: Beringen
- 1979–1982: Cercle Brugge
- 1982–1985: KV Mechelen
- 1985–1987: Eendracht Aalst
- 1987–1989: Patro Eisden
- 1989–1990: Boom
- 1990–1993: Overpelt-Fabriek
- * Club domestic league appearances and goals

Leonard Canjels (1 April 1933 – 26 May 2010) was a Dutch international footballer who played for NAC Breda.

== Playing career ==
=== Club ===
Canjels started playing football at Breda side VV Baronie. He made his debut for NAC in the 1956/1957 season and played seven years for the club before retiring. As a NAC Breda player, Canjels twice won the Eredivisie top goalscorers award, in 1958 and 1959.

Canjels was nicknamed Het Kanon (the Gun) because of his powerful shooting.

=== International ===
Canjels made his debut for the Netherlands in a May 1959 friendly match against Turkey and earned a total of 3 caps, scoring 2 goals. He won his other caps in friendlies against Bulgaria and Scotland in the same year.

== Managerial career ==
After retiring as a player, Canjels became a coach, first at amateur sides Dongen and Baronie and later managed NAC Breda, as well as Club Brugge and Cercle Brugge among others in Belgium. With Brugge he won the Belgian league title in 1973.

He retired from coaching in 1990.

He died on 26 May 2010 after a long illness.
