= Leo Bosschart =

Dutch footballer

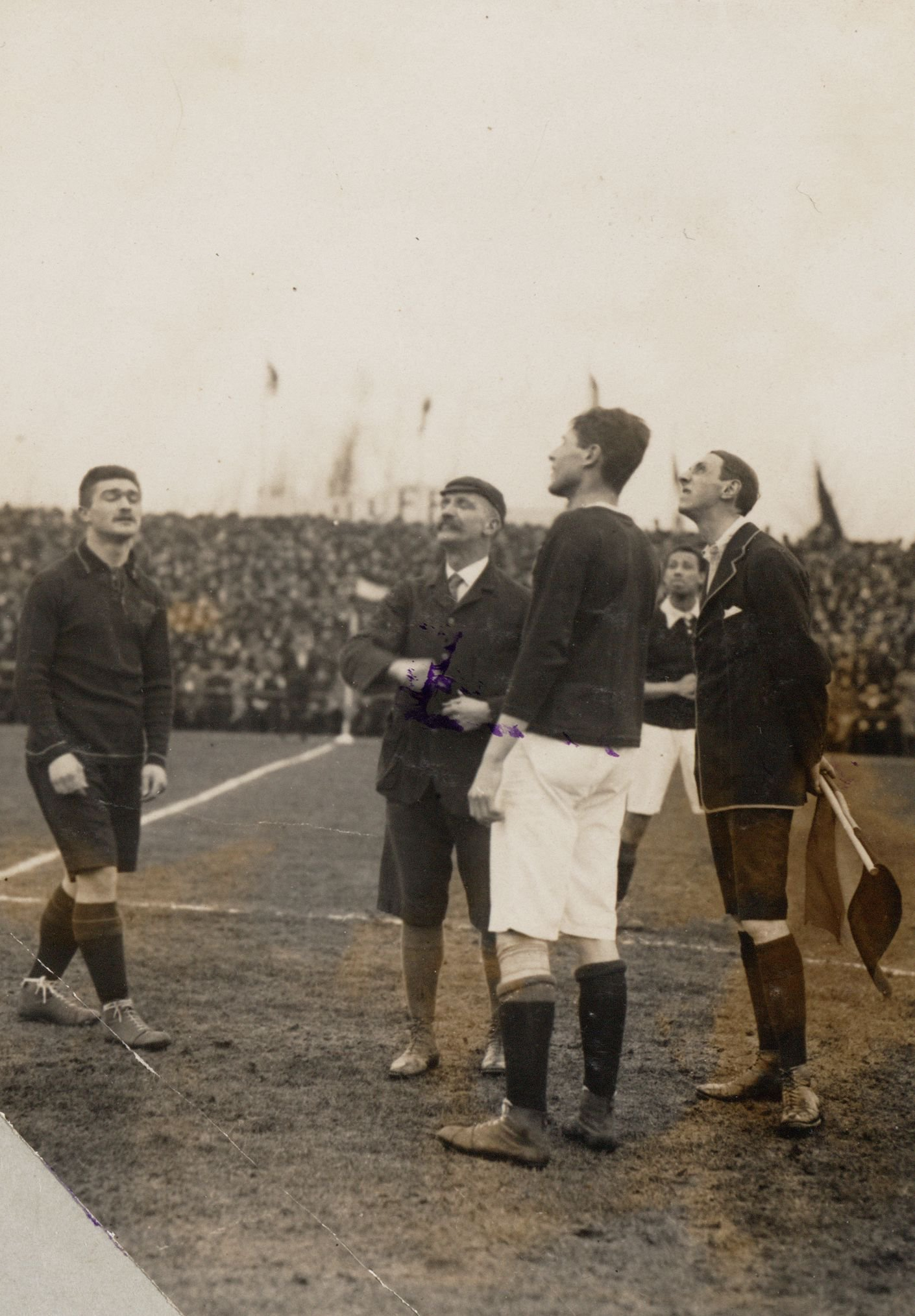
- Bosschart (white shorts), 1914

Personal information
- Full name: Leonard François Gerard Bosschart
- Date of birth: 24 August 1888
- Place of birth: Kota Radja, Dutch East Indies
- Date of death: 9 May 1951 (aged 62)
- Place of death: Hoboken, Antwerp, Belgium
- Position: Midfielder

Youth career
- 1905–1909: Quick

Senior career*
Years	Team	Apps	(Gls)
1909–1921	Quick		

International career
1909–1920	Netherlands	19	(1)
- * Club domestic league appearances and goals

Medal record

Men's football

Representing Netherlands

Olympic Games
Bronze medal – third place	1920 Antwerp	Team competition

Leonard "Leo" François Gerard Bosschart (24 August 1888 – 9 May 1951) was a football player from the Netherlands, who captained his home country at the 1920 Summer Olympics in Antwerp, Belgium. There he won the bronze medal with the Netherlands national football team.

== Club career ==
A versatile midfielder, Bosschart played for Quick.

== International career ==
Bosschart made his debut for Netherlands in a December 1909 friendly match against England and earned a total of 19 caps, scoring 1 goal. His final international was a September 1920 friendly against Spain.

== Personal life ==
Born in the Dutch East Indies to Francois Guilleaume Jacques Bosschart and Anna Catharina Gerardina Eras, Bosschart studied engineering in Delft and became chief engineer at Burgenhout in Rotterdam and director of the Conrad shipyard. From 1938 until his death in 1951, Bosschart was director of the John Cockerill shipyard in Hoboken, Belgium.
