= Dolf Heijnen =

Dutch footballer (1894–1966)

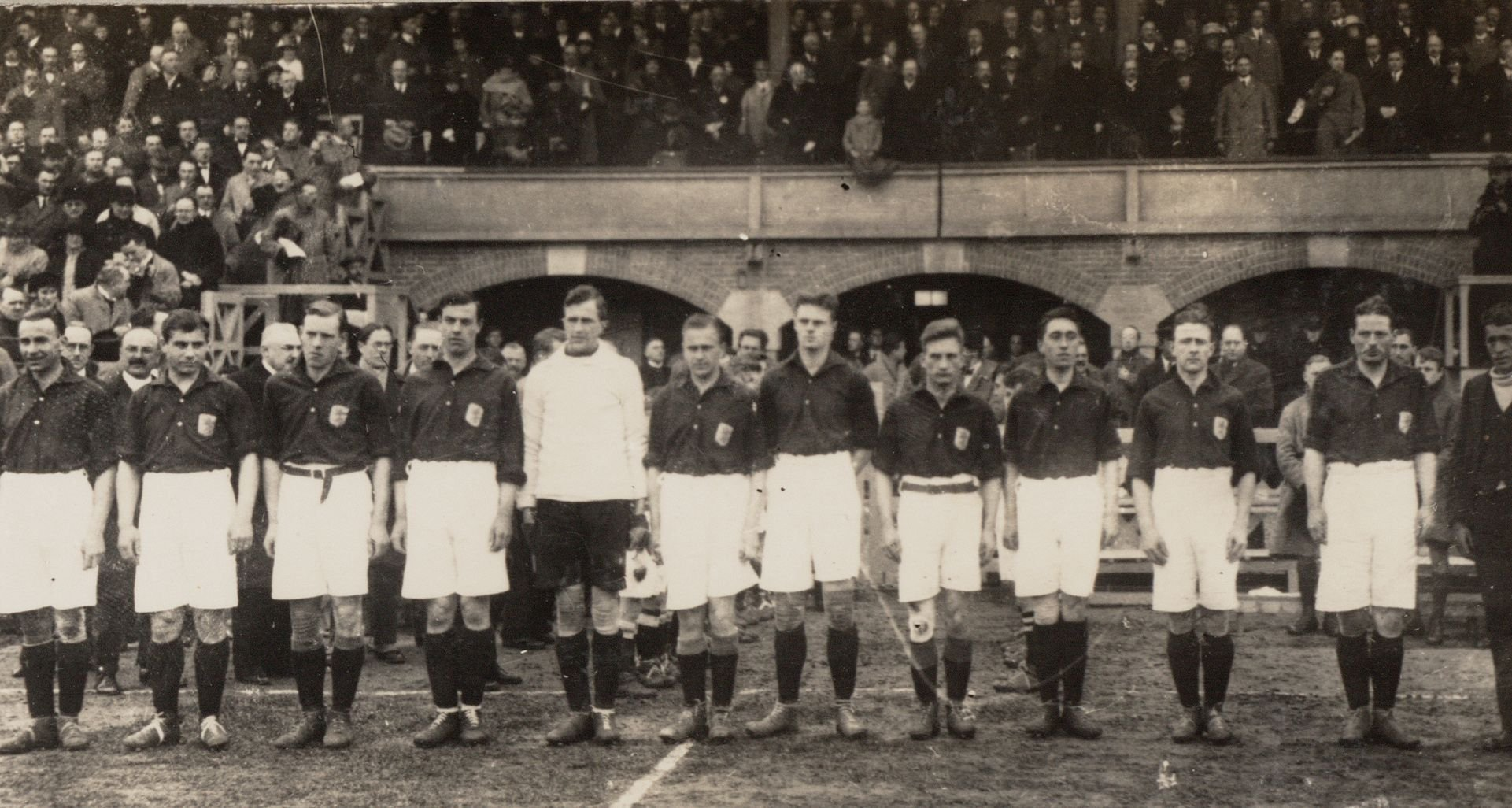
- Heijen (4th from left) w. the Netherlands national football team (1923)

Personal information
- Full name: Adolf Johannes Antonius Heijnen
- Date of birth: 25 October 1894
- Place of birth: The Hague, Netherlands
- Date of death: 11 December 1966 (aged 72)
- Position: Striker

Senior career*
Years	Team	Apps	(Gls)
1914–1924	HVV Den Haag		

International career
1923	Netherlands	2	(1)
- * Club domestic league appearances and goals

Dolf Heijnen (25 October 1894 – 11 December 1966) was a Dutch footballer. He played in two matches for the Netherlands national football team in 1923.
