= Arend Schoemaker =

Dutch footballer

Personal information
- Date of birth: 8 November 1911
- Place of birth: Diever, Netherlands
- Date of death: 11 May 1982 (aged 70)
- Position: Forward

Senior career*
Years	Team	Apps	(Gls)
- Quick Den Haag

International career
1933	Netherlands	1	(0)
- * Club domestic league appearances and goals

Arend Schoemaker (8 November 1911 – 11 May 1982) was a Dutch football forward who part of the Netherlands team in the 1934 FIFA World Cup. He also played for Quick Den Haag.
