= André Wetzel =

Dutch football manager (born 1951)

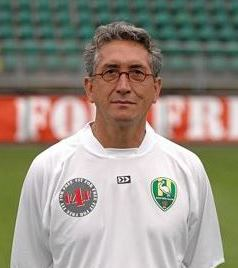
- Wetzel in 2009

Personal information
- Date of birth: 3 November 1951 (age 75)
- Place of birth: Surabaya, Indonesia
- Position: Midfielder

Team information
- Current team: HVV Den Haag (head coach)

Youth career
- Voetbal Club Sparta

Senior career*
Years	Team	Apps	(Gls)
1972–1975	Haarlem	48	(2)
1975–1979	FC Amsterdam	107	(26)
1979–1981	FC Den Haag	50	(5)
1981–1982	Telstar	29	(0)
Total		234	(33)

Managerial career
- RVC
- 1992–1997: HVV Den Haag
- 1997–2000: ADO Den Haag (assistant)
- 2000–2001: Den Bosch (assistant)
- 2001–2002: ASWH
- 2000–2002: Netherlands (youth coach)
- 2002–2004: Willem II (assistant)
- 2004: Willem II
- 2004: Al-Jazeera
- 2005: Feyenoord (scout)
- 2005–2006: Mechelen
- 2006–2008: VVV-Venlo
- 2008–2009: ADO Den Haag
- 2011–2016: HBS Craeyenhout
- 2017–2018: AFC
- 2018–: HVV Den Haag
- * Club domestic league appearances and goals

André Wetzel (born 3 November 1951) is a Dutch football manager and former player who manages HVV Den Haag.

== Playing career ==
Wetzel started his playing career with HFC Haarlem in 1972. In 1975, he joined FC Amsterdam, where he played over 100 games. In 1978, he moved to his hometown club of ADO Den Haag. He finished his career at Stormvogels Telstar in 1982.

== Coaching career ==
Wetzel started his coaching career in 1997 when he joined ADO Den Haag as assistant manager. He then went to Den Bosch where he was assistant to Jan Poortvliet. During this time he was also a youth coach for the Netherlands national team. His first managerial role came in 2004 when he took over the reins at Willem II Tilburg after being assistant there for two years. He was only there for a matter of months, however, as he took over at Qatari club Al-Jazeera Sports Club where he also lasted only months. He returned to management in 2005 with Belgian Second Division club KV Mechelen. In 2006, he took charge at VVV-Venlo where he remained until 2008 when he took over at ADO Den Haag. In April 2009 he was moved into a technical directorship position, with Raymond Atteveld replacing him, only to be dismissed altogether later in December. On 9 December 2010, United Arab Emirates side Al-Jazira Club appointed him as a technical director. In December 2011, he was appointed manager of HBS Craeyenhout.
