= Willy Brokamp =

Dutch footballer

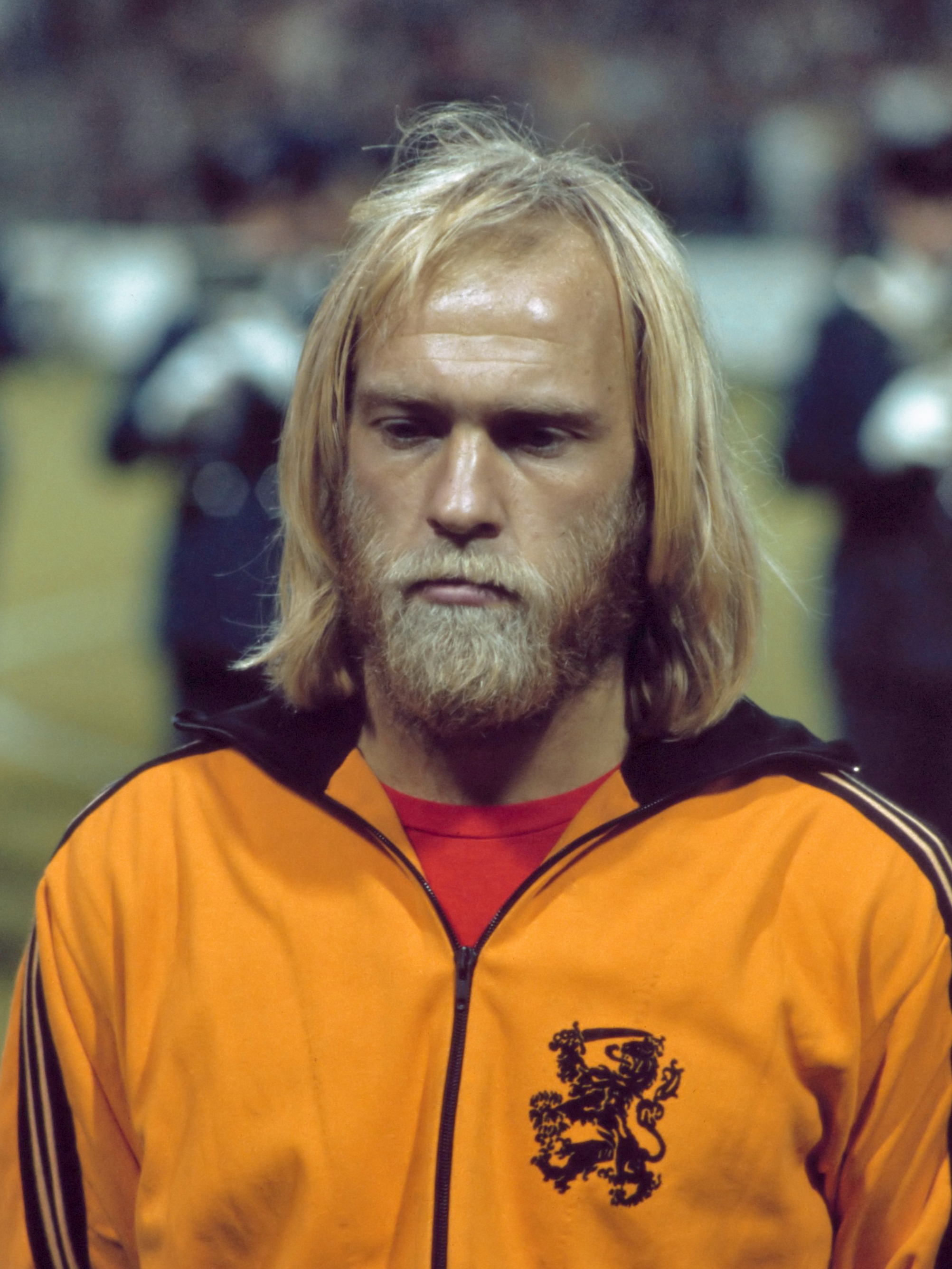
- Brokamp in 1973

Personal information
- Full name: Willem Jozef Theresia Maria Brokamp
- Date of birth: 25 February 1946 (age 80)
- Place of birth: Chevremont, Netherlands
- Position: Striker

Youth career
- Chevremont

Senior career*
Years	Team	Apps	(Gls)
1964–1974	MVV	297	(123)
1974–1976	Ajax	55	(23)
1976–1978	MVV	36	(17)
Total		388	(163)

International career
1970–1973	Netherlands	6	(6)
- * Club domestic league appearances and goals

Willy Brokamp (born 25 February 1946) is a retired football player for MVV in the 1960s and 1970s who recruited him from RKVV Chèvremont (in the community of Kerkrade). His nickname was "The blond arrow".

He ranked highly in the Footballer of the Year classification for several times. In 1973, he shared the first place on the list of top scorers with 18 goals together with Cas Janssens.

== Club career ==
In 1974, he transferred to Ajax Amsterdam, where he himself had two very good seasons (1974/75, 1975/76).

== International career ==
He also played six games for the Dutch national team and scored six goals. Despite his talent, manager Rinus Michels only used him a few times because he thought Brokamp was lacking discipline.

== Personal life ==
Brokamp was not only a footballer. During his football career he started his own bar. For many years he was manager of the bar "Aux Pays-Bas" next to the Vrijthof and several other establishments in Maastricht.

He currently lives in Kanne, Belgium near Maastricht. Since 1999, he also owns a bar there, named In Kanne en Kruike.

== Honours ==
MVV

- UEFA Intertoto Cup: 1970
