= Cas Janssens =

Dutch footballer (1944–2024)

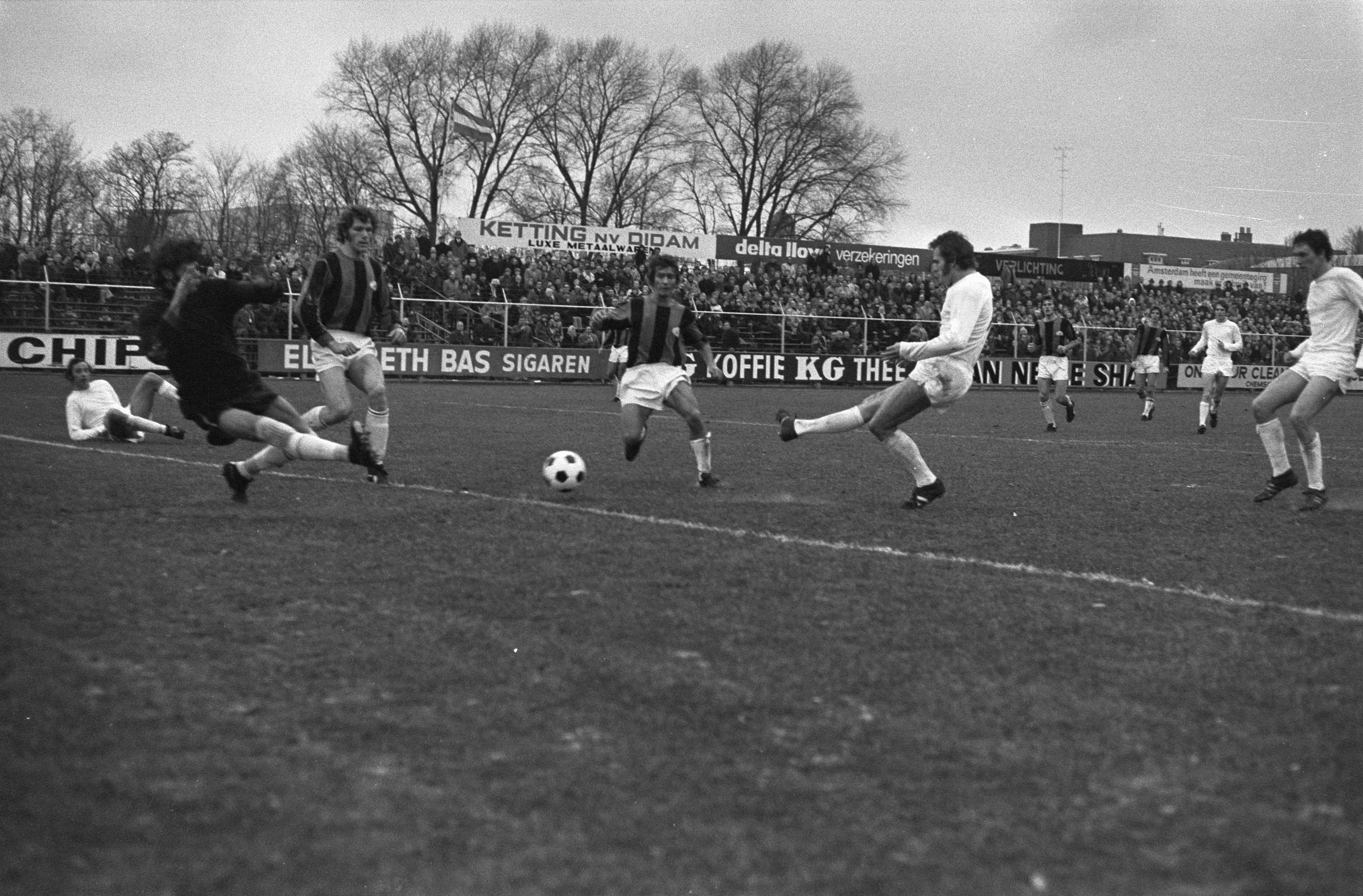
- Janssens in 1971

Personal information
- Full name: Franciscus Janssens
- Date of birth: 3 August 1944
- Place of birth: Tilburg, German-occupied Netherlands
- Date of death: 4 July 2024 (aged 79)
- Place of death: Nîmes, France
- Position: Forward

Senior career*
Years	Team	Apps	(Gls)
1965–1967	NOAD Tilburg		
1967–1970	FC Wageningen		
1970–1973	N.E.C.	95	(35)
1973–1974	Nîmes		
1974–1975	OC de Charleroi	31	(7)
1975–1976	Groningen	20	(7)
1976–1977	US Noeux-les-Mines		
- * Club domestic league appearances and goals

Franciscus "Cas" Janssens (3 August 1944 – 4 July 2024) was a Dutch footballer who played as a forward. In 1973, he shared the first place on the list of top scorers with 18 goals together with Willy Brokamp. Janssens died in Nîmes on 4 July 2024, at the age of 79.
