= Geoffrey Burch =

English cricketer

Personal information
- Full name: Geoffrey Worth Burch
- Born: 12 April 1937 (age 89); Braunstone, Leicestershire, England
- Died: 19 September 2022; Swansea
- Batting: Right-handed
- Bowling: Right-arm medium
- Role: Wicket-keeper

Domestic team information
- Years: Team
- 1958–1964: Leicestershire

Career statistics
Competition	First-class
Matches	46
Runs scored	1,067
Batting average	15.46
100s/50s	–/4
Top score	64*
Balls bowled	12
Wickets	–
Bowling average	–
5 wickets in innings	–
10 wickets in match	–
Best bowling	–
Catches/stumpings	55/–
- Source: Cricinfo, 5 February 2013

Geoffrey Worth Burch (born 12 April 1937) is a former English cricketer. Burch was a right-handed batsman who bowled right-arm medium pace and who could also play as a wicket-keeper. He was born at Braunstone, Leicestershire.

Burch made his first-class debut for Leicestershire against Hampshire in the 1958 County Championship, making six further appearances in that season. The following season he established himself in the Leicestershire team, making 24 first-class appearances in 1959, scoring 724 runs at an average of 20.11. He also made three half centuries with a high score of 64 not out, which he made against Nottinghamshire. Burch didn't play for Leicestershire again until 1963, making three appearances in that season, before making twelve first-class appearances in 1964, the last of which came against Essex in the 1964 County Championship. Burch scored 254 runs in his final season with Leicestershire, at an average of 15.00 and with a single half century score of 59 against Hampshire. Burch played a total of 46 first-class matches for Leicestershire, scoring 1,067 runs at an average of 15.46, with a high score of 64 not out. In the field he took 55 catches.
