= HV & CV Quick =

Dutch football club

- Full name: Haagse Voetbal & Cricket Vereniging Quick
- Nickname: De Haantjes
- Founded: 1 March 1896; 130 years ago
- Ground: Sportpark Nieuw Hanenburg, The Hague
- Capacity: 2,500
- Manager: Paul van der Zwaan
- League: Vierde Divisie
- 2024–25: Derde Divisie B, 18th of 18 (relegated)
- Website: http://www.quick.nl/
Home colours

HV & CV Quick, also known as Quick Den Haag, is a Dutch football and cricket club from The Hague. Since 2017, its first male football squad plays in the Derde Divisie. Quick is the Dutch national football champion of 1908 and Dutch National Cup winner of 1909, 1910, 1911, and 1916.

The cricket departments of both men and women have won the national championship multiple times. The male department won three times in the second half of the 20th century and twice in the 21st century. The women won the title five times in the 21st century.

== Football ==
=== Notable players ===
The following players were called up to represent their national teams in international football and received caps during their tenure with Quick Den Haag:

- (Netherlands) Leo Bosschart (1909–1921)
- (Netherlands) Wim Groskamp (1906–1910)
- (Netherlands) Henk Muller (1905–1906)
- (Netherlands) Louis Otten (1905–1914; 1922–1923)
- (Netherlands) Jops Reeman (1905–1908)
- (Netherlands) Arend Schoemaker (1931–1934)
- (Netherlands) Edu Snethlage (1903–1910)
- (Netherlands) Noud Stempels (1907–1908)
- (Netherlands) Caius Welcker (1905–1911)

- Years in brackets indicate careerspan with Quick Den Haag.

=== Players in international tournaments ===
The following is a list of Quick Den Haag players who have competed in international tournaments, having appeared in the FIFA World Cup.

| Cup | Players |
|---|---|
| (Italy) 1934 FIFA World Cup | (Netherlands) Arend Schoemaker |

=== Honours ===
Netherlands Football League Championship

- Champions (1): 1907–08

KNVB Cup

- Winners (4): 1908–09, 1909–10, (Note: The 1908–09, and the 1909–10 editions of the Dutch Cup were actually won by the clubs' reserves team, Quick Den Haag 2.) 1910–11, 1915–16
