= RC & FC Concordia =

Former football team in Rotterdam, Netherlands

R.C. & F.C. Concordia
- Full name: Rotterdamsche cricket- en footballclub Concordia
- Founded: 1884
- Dissolved: 1889
- Ground: Stieltjes Monument
Home colours

Rotterdamsche cricket- en footballclub Concordia is a former Dutch amateur association football club from Rotterdam.

== History ==
The club was founded on 16 May 1884 as a cricket club, and started playing football in 1886. In 1888–89, the club finished top of an informal club ranking, with 5 wins in 7 first-class matches.

One of the club's players was Pieter Droogleever Fortuyn, who was one of the founder members of the KNVB and later Mayor of Rotterdam.

The club merged on 12 June 1891 with the Rotterdam football club RC & FC Olympia to form the Rotterdamsche Cricket & Voetbal Vereniging Rotterdam.

== Colours ==
The club wore all black, other than a red cap with a black star.

== Ground ==
The club's ground was behind the Stieltjes monument.
