= VVA/Spartaan =

Dutch football club

Coordinates: 52°22′26″N 4°50′20″E

- Full name: Voetbal Vereniging Amsterdam / Spartaan
- Founded: 22 September 1901; 123 years ago
- Ground: Sportpark Jan van Galen, Amsterdam, Netherlands
- League: Derde Klasse Saturday (2012–13); Derde Klasse Sunday (2012–13)
- Website: http://www.vva-spartaan.nl/
Home colours

VVA/Spartaan is a Dutch amateur football club from the Amsterdam borough of Amsterdam-West in the neighborhood Bos en Lommer, founded in 1901. The club hold both a Saturday and a Sunday team, with both competing in the Derde Klasse.

== History ==
The club was founded on 1 July 1988 as a fusion of two clubs VVA (founded on 22 September 1901) and De Spartaan (founded on 20 April 1903). Both teams had previously competed in the top league during their history, while both teams reached the KNVB Cup final in their own right as well. VVA in 1918 and De Spartaan in 1926 and in 1937. The club also has an indoor Futsal team, as well as a full youth system.

== Players ==
=== National team players ===
The following players were called up to represent their national teams in international football and received caps during their tenure with De Spartaan:

- (Netherlands) Jan van Gendt (1917–1923)
- (Netherlands) Jaap Grobbe (1921–1922)
- (Netherlands) Jan de Natris (1921–1923)

- Years in brackets indicate careerspan with De Spartaan.

== Honours ==
KNVB District Cup West I (Sunday clubs)

1965*, 1968*

* De Spartaan
