= HVV Den Haag =

Dutch amateur football club

HVV
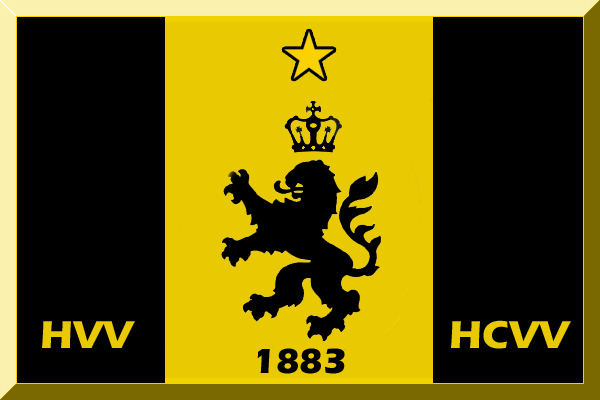
- Full name: Haagse Voetbal Vereniging
- Founded: 1883
- Ground: De Diepput, The Hague, South Holland
- Chairman: Hans Willinge
- Manager: André Wetzel
- League: Saturday Eerste Klasse B (District West 2)
- 2022–23: Saturday Eerste Klasse B (District West 2); 10th of 14
- Website: konhcvv.nl
Home colours	Away colours

HVV (Haagse Voetbal Vereniging; Dutch for The Hague Football Club) is an amateur football club in The Hague, Netherlands. It was founded in 1883 as an extension of HCC, (The) Hague Cricket Club. In 1978, on the occasion of the club's centenary, Queen Juliana granted the club royal patronage, with prefix Koninklijke ("Royal"), because of its pioneering role in sport, including in the formation of the Royal Dutch Football Association (KNVB) in 1889. Since then it has been called Koninklijke Haagse Cricket & Voetbal Vereniging (Royal The Hague Cricket & Football Club), abbreviated KHC&VV. The club's grounds since 1898 have been at the 1,200-capacity "De Diepput", on the border between Benoordenhout and Wassenaar. It now also plays tennis, squash and judo and has around 1750 members.

== History ==
HVV was the most successful Dutch football club prior to World War I, winning ten Dutch championships between 1890 and 1914. Two of its players won bronze medals with the Dutch side in the 1912 Olympic football tournament. Subsequently, it was superseded as the top club in the Hague by HBS and then ADO. Its last season in top-flight football was 1932. The introduction of professionalism by the KNVB in 1954 did not affect lower division clubs such as HVV.

== Former players ==
=== National team players ===
The following players were called up to represent their national teams in international football and received caps during their tenure with HVV Den Haag:

- (Netherlands) Law Adam (1925–1927; 1933)
- (Netherlands) Jan van Breda Kolff (1910–1913)
- (Netherlands) Joop Campioni (1918–1921)
- (Netherlands) Lo La Chapelle (1906–1908)
- (Netherlands) Constant Feith (1903–1920)
- (Netherlands) Dolf Heijnen (1914–1923)
- (Netherlands) John Heijning (1906–1912)
- (Netherlands) Karel Heijting (1904–1913)
- (Netherlands) Boelie Kessler (1918–1922)
- (Netherlands) Dé Kessler (1904–1920)
- (Netherlands) Dolf Kessler (1900–1907)
- (Netherlands) Tonny Kessler (1904–1923)
- (Netherlands) Miel van Leijden (1902–1912)
- (Netherlands) Guus Lutjens (1906–1911)
- (Netherlands) Dick MacNeill (1919–1921)
- (Netherlands) Miel Mundt (1899–1909)
- (Netherlands) Jan Noorduijn (1910–1916)
- (Netherlands) Marius Sandberg (1924–1931)
- (Netherlands) Jan Schoemaker (1902–1908)
- (Netherlands) Guus de Serière (1909–1912)
- (Netherlands) Albert Snouck Hurgronje (1898–1909)
- (Netherlands) Eetje Sol (1898–1909)
- (Netherlands) Rens Vis (1924–1928)

- Years in brackets indicate careerspan with HVV Den Haag.

== Current status ==
HVV is now an amateur football club. The main squad, HVV 1, was promoted after the 2006–2007 season, and again in 2008–2009 season, and is now playing in the Sunday Tweede Klasse C, the seventh tier of football in the Netherlands, in KNVB District West 2.

== Honours ==
=== Football ===
In May 2007, the KNVB endorsed a scheme for teams to wear one gold star on their shirts for every ten national championships won; HVV are one of four teams eligible for a star, alongside Ajax, Feyenoord, and PSV, three former European champions. The first shirt emblazoned with the gold star will be sold at an auction on 24 November 2007 to mark the opening of the club's new clubhouse.

- Eerste Klasse West & Dutch national champions: 10

1890–91, 1895–96, 1899–1900, 1900–01, 1901–02, 1902–03, 1904–05, 1906–07, 1909–10, 1913–14

- KNVB Cup: 1

1902–03

- KNVB Cup Runner-up: 3

1898–99, 1903–04, 1909–10

=== Cricket ===
HCC is the most successful cricket team in Dutch history. It won the first, unofficial, national championship in 1884. Its first XI is still in the top division. It was so dominant after World War I that its second XI was allowed into the top division in 1925. The following year these two sides shared the national title, and the second XI won it outright on several occasions.

In this list, (II) indicates second XI; (jt.) indicates joint champions who shared the title.

- Dutch champions: 49

1895, 1899, 1900(jt.), 1903, 1910(jt.), 1912, 1916, 1917, 1919, 1920, 1921, 1922, 1923, 1925, 1926 (HCC and HCC(II) shared), 1927, 1928(II), 1929(II), 1930(II), 1931, 1932(II jt.), 1933, 1934, 1935(II), 1936, 1940(jt.), 1941, 1947, 1952(II), 1955(II), 1956, 1957, 1958, 1959, 1960, 1961(II), 1963, 1964, 1965 (jt.), 1966, 1967, 1968, 1972, 1973(II), 1976, 1985, 2008, 2020, 2022

== Coaching history ==
- (England) Jimmy Yates (1904)
- (England) Fred Coles (1908–1913)
- (England) Fred Warburton (1913–1935)
- (England) Fred Pagnam (1935), interim
- (England) Bert Bellamy (1935–1937)
- (England) Thomas Clay (1937–1939)
- (England) Bernard Oxley (1939–1940)
- (Netherlands) Gerrit van Wijhe (1940–1943)
- (Netherlands) Jan Wolf (1943–1945)
- (Netherlands) Gerrit van Osch (1945–1964)
- (Hungary) Zoltan Szalai (1964), interim
- (Netherlands) Gerrit van Osch (1964–1966)
- (Netherlands) Cock Kroon (1966–1968)
- (Netherlands) Theo Creemers (1968–1969)
- (Netherlands) Harry de Vos (1969–1971)
- (Netherlands) Jan Mak (1971), interim
- (England) Geoffrey Burch (1971–1981)
- (Netherlands) Ab Aalberts (1981–1983)
- (Netherlands) Geert van Vugt (1983–1986)
- (Netherlands) Rob Wijnstok (1986–1989)
- (Netherlands) Frank Bijloos (1989–1992)
- (Netherlands) André Wetzel (1992–1997)
- (Netherlands) Kees Mol (1997), interim
- (Netherlands) Frank Kuyl (1997–2000)
- (Netherlands) Wim Visser (2000–2003)
- (Netherlands) Jan van der Laan (2003–2005)
- (Netherlands) Harold Tjaden (2005–2007)
- (Netherlands) Kees Mol (2007–2010)
- (Netherlands) Faisal Soekhai (2010–2011)
- (Netherlands) Hans Bal en Steven Faber (2011–2012), interim
- (Netherlands) Albert van der Dussen (2012–2015)
- (Netherlands) Edmund Vriesde (2015), interim
- (Netherlands) Edmund Vriesde (2015–2018)
- (Netherlands) André Wetzel (2018 – present)
