= Van der Gaag =

van der Gaag is a Dutch surname. Notable people with the surname include:

- Anna van der Gaag, British speech and language therapist and academic
- Linda van der Gaag (born 1959), Dutch computer scientist
- Lotti van der Gaag (1923–1999), Dutch sculptor and painter
- Wim van der Gaag (born 1936), Dutch footballer and coach
  - Mitchell van der Gaag (born 1971), Dutch footballer and coach, son of Wim
    - Jordan van der Gaag (born 1999), Dutch footballer, son of Mitchell
    - Lucas van der Gaag (born 2001), Dutch footballer, son of Mitchell

== See also ==
- Van der Gaag Lane, road in Delft, Netherlands
