= 1945–46 Netherlands Football League Championship =

Netherl. Football Championship
- Season: 1945–1946
- Champions: HFC Haarlem (1st title)

The Netherlands Football League Championship 1945–1946 was contested by 66 teams participating in six divisions. The national champion would be determined by a play-off featuring the winners of the eastern, northern, two southern and two western football divisions of the Netherlands. HFC Haarlem won this year's championship by beating AFC Ajax, sc Heerenveen, NAC, NEC Nijmegen and Limburgia.

== New entrants ==
Eerste Klasse East:

- Promoted from 2nd Division: Be Quick Zutphen

Eerste Klasse North:

- Promoted from 2nd Division: LAC Frisia 1883

Eerste Klasse South-I:

- Moving in from the combined southern division from 1943-44: BVV Den Bosch, FC Eindhoven, LONGA, NAC, NOAD and Willem II
- Promoted from 2nd Division: Baronie/DNL, RBC Roosendaal, RKTVV Tilburg, VC Vlissingen & VV Helmond

Eerste Klasse South-II: (new division)

- Moving in from the combined southern division from 1943-44: Juliana, Maurits, MVV Maastricht, PSV Eindhoven, RFC Roermond and De Spechten
- Promoted from 2nd Division: Bleijerheide, Brabantia, Limburgia, SC Emma & VVV Venlo

Eerste Klasse West-I:

- Moving in from West-II: AFC Ajax, Emma, HVV 't Gooi, RFC Rotterdam and VSV
- Promoted from 2nd Division: DOS

Eerste Klasse West-II:

- Moving in from West-I: DFC, DWS, HBS Craeyenhout, Sparta Rotterdam and Stormvogels
- Promoted from 2nd Division: SC Neptunus

== Divisions ==
=== Eerste Klasse East ===
Pos	Team	Pld	W	D	L	GF	GA	GD	Pts	Qualification or relegation
1	NEC Nijmegen	20	10	7	3	46	28	+18	27	Qualified for Championship play-off
2	Go Ahead	20	11	4	5	51	32	+19	26	
3	Enschedese Boys	20	11	4	5	54	43	+11	26	
4	AGOVV Apeldoorn	20	9	7	4	47	35	+12	25	
5	Heracles	20	7	7	6	40	33	+7	21	
6	Quick Nijmegen	20	8	5	7	31	35	−4	21	
7	Be Quick Zutphen	20	7	4	9	47	42	+5	18	
8	SC Enschede	20	7	4	9	38	48	−10	18	
9	HVV Tubantia	20	6	4	10	41	54	−13	16	
10	FC Wageningen	20	4	4	12	27	44	−17	12	
11	PEC Zwolle	20	4	2	14	31	59	−28	10	Relegated to 2nd Division

Source: rsssf.com

=== Eerste Klasse North ===
Pos	Team	Pld	W	D	L	GF	GA	GD	Pts	Qualification or relegation
1	sc Heerenveen	20	16	1	3	69	25	+44	33	Qualified for Championship play-off
2	GVAV Rapiditas	19	11	4	4	46	20	+26	26	
3	Sneek Wit Zwart	18	9	4	5	28	19	+9	22	
4	VV Leeuwarden	20	10	2	8	36	31	+5	22	
5	Be Quick 1887	18	8	3	7	36	29	+7	19	
6	Velocitas 1897	19	7	3	9	32	34	−2	17	
7	Achilles 1894	20	7	3	10	26	43	−17	17	
8	Veendam	19	7	2	10	25	51	−26	16	
9	HSC	19	4	6	9	23	27	−4	14	
10	LAC Frisia 1883	19	5	4	10	26	40	−14	14	
11	LSC Sneek	19	3	4	12	15	43	−28	10	Relegated to 2nd Division

Source: rsssf.com

=== Eerste Klasse South-I ===
Pos	Team	Pld	W	D	L	GF	GA	GD	Pts	Qualification or relegation
1	NAC	20	15	3	2	52	16	+36	33	Play-off as level on points
2	BVV Den Bosch	20	16	1	3	59	12	+47	33	Play-off as level on points
3	LONGA	19	11	6	2	47	14	+33	28	
4	NOAD	20	13	2	5	42	34	+8	28	
5	FC Eindhoven	19	10	4	5	42	20	+22	24	Transferred to South-II
6	Willem II	20	9	4	7	45	35	+10	22	
7	Baronie/DNL	20	4	6	10	37	56	−19	14	
8	VV Helmond	20	2	7	11	21	42	−21	11	
9	VC Vlissingen	20	4	3	13	24	50	−26	11	
10	RKTVV Tilburg	20	2	4	14	19	67	−48	8	
11	RBC Roosendaal	20	2	2	16	21	63	−42	6	Relegated to 2nd Division

Source: rsssf.com

Transferred to South-II Team moving to Division South-II next season.

=== Play-off ===
Team 1	Score	Team 2
NAC	1 - 0	BVV Den Bosch

NAC qualified for the Championship Play-off.

=== Eerste Klasse South-II ===
Pos	Team	Pld	W	D	L	GF	GA	GD	Pts	Qualification or relegation
1	Limburgia	20	13	2	5	47	22	+25	28	Qualified for Championship play-off
2	MVV Maastricht	20	11	5	4	62	33	+29	27	
3	Maurits	20	11	2	7	44	36	+8	24	
4	Juliana	20	10	4	6	42	41	+1	24	
5	Brabantia	19	9	4	6	36	29	+7	22	
6	SC Emma	20	7	5	8	37	39	−2	19	
7	PSV Eindhoven	20	7	4	9	42	35	+7	18	
8	VVV Venlo	19	7	4	8	48	51	−3	18	Transferred to South-I
9	Bleijerheide	20	6	2	12	46	61	−15	14	
10	De Spechten	20	6	1	13	33	53	−20	13	
11	RFC Roermond	20	5	1	14	36	73	−37	11	Relegated to 2nd Division

Source: rsssf.com

=== Eerste Klasse West-I ===
Pos	Team	Pld	W	D	L	GF	GA	GD	Pts	Qualification
1	AFC Ajax	20	15	3	2	72	35	+37	33	Qualified for Championship play-off
2	De Volewijckers	20	15	2	3	81	42	+39	32	Transferred to West-II
3	Hermes DVS	20	10	4	6	66	59	+7	24	
4	Xerxes	20	11	1	8	73	59	+14	23	Transferred to West-II
5	ADO Den Haag	20	9	3	8	61	53	+8	21	
6	DOS	20	9	1	10	41	44	−3	19	Transferred to West-II
7	Emma	20	7	3	10	39	42	−3	17	
8	HFC EDO	20	6	3	11	39	52	−13	15	
9	VSV	20	6	3	11	50	75	−25	15	
10	RFC Rotterdam	20	5	1	14	32	71	−39	11	
11	HVV 't Gooi	20	5	0	15	38	60	−22	10	

Source: rsssf.com

=== Eerste Klasse West-II ===
Pos	Team	Pld	W	D	L	GF	GA	GD	Pts	Qualification or relegation
1	HFC Haarlem	20	13	1	6	57	31	+26	27	Qualified for Championship play-off
2	Blauw-Wit Amsterdam	20	11	3	6	45	22	+23	25	
3	Sparta Rotterdam	20	10	3	7	33	32	+1	23	Transferred to West-I
4	DWS	20	8	6	6	35	29	+6	22	Transferred to West-I
5	SC Neptunus	20	7	7	6	34	34	0	21	
6	Feijenoord	20	7	5	8	40	33	+7	19	Transferred to West-I
7	DHC Delft	20	7	5	8	28	38	−10	19	
8	Stormvogels	20	8	3	9	28	40	−12	19	
9	HBS Craeyenhout	20	7	3	10	42	45	−3	17	
10	DFC	20	7	3	10	40	50	−10	17	
11	VUC	20	5	1	14	27	55	−28	11	Relegated to 2nd Division

Source: rsssf.com

=== Championship play-off ===
Pos	Team	Pld	W	D	L	GF	GA	GD	Pts	Result	HAA	AJA	HEE	NAC	NEC	LIM
1	HFC Haarlem	10	7	1	2	22	21	+1	15	Champion		2–0	2–0	4–1	2–2	2–1
2	AFC Ajax	10	7	0	3	33	16	+17	14		8–0		2–1	4–2	4–1	3–1
3	sc Heerenveen	10	5	0	5	23	26	−3	10		3–1	2–1		3–2	4–3	5–3
4	NAC	10	4	0	6	15	20	−5	8		1–2	1–3	2–1		0–2	2–0
5	NEC Nijmegen	10	3	1	6	22	32	−10	7		3–4	1–6	6–3	1–3		1–0
6	Limburgia	10	3	0	7	22	22	0	6		2–3	5–2	4–1	0–1	6–2	

Source: rsssf.com
