= Janus van der Gijp =

Dutch footballer and manager

Janus van de Gijp
Personal information
- Full name: Jurianus van de Gijp
- Date of birth: 14 February 1921
- Place of birth: Dordrecht, Netherlands
- Date of death: 1 September 1988 (aged 67)
- Place of death: Rotterdam, Netherlands
- Position: Forward

Youth career
- Emma

Senior career*
Years	Team	Apps	(Gls)
1939–1957	Emma		
1957–1959	DHC	52	(16)

Managerial career
- 1954: ASWH
- 1959–1961: Zwaluwen
- * Club domestic league appearances and goals

Jurianus "Janus" van de Gijp (1921–1988) was a professional footballer from Dordrecht for SC Emma. He played on the team alongside his brothers Cor, Wim, and Freek, and their cousin Jur. Janus played in the position of right-winger.

== Playing career ==
In 1949, Van der Gijp scored the last goal in the 3–0 victory over FC Eindhoven in the Zilveren Bal tournament finals, where all goals were by the Van der Gijps. The Van der Gijp machine had previously knocked Feyenoord out in the semifinals. Also in 1949, Van der Gijp missed a penalty in a friendly tryout game on the Dutch National Team against Sweden. Van der Gijp had a decisive contribution in the return of SC Emma to the Eerste Klasse in 1950.

In 1954, the Eerste Klasse turned professional with SC Emma and Janus van der Gijp in it. In the first round of professional football through the KNVB, SC Emma beat Roda Sport 2–1 with the Dordrecht goals shot by Cor and Janus van der Gijp. He also tried managing that year. For six weeks at the beginning of the 1954–55 season, he coached the Saturday amateur team of ASWH, then quit and concentrated again entirely on playing. In 1955–56, after Cor left, Janus was the top scorer of SC Emma, along with Wim van der Gaag (who played just one season in SC Emma). In 1957, when Van der Gijp was about 36, SC Emma sold Van der Gijp to DHC Delft.

== Coaching career ==
From 1959 until 1961, Janus van der Gijp was the manager of VV Zwaluwen, continuing to fellow amateur sides BEC Delft (1961–1963), VV BMT (1963–1965), NADO-Vooruitgang (1965–19??), SV WCR (19??–1973), RVV LMO (1973–1975), TDC Rotterdam (1975–1977), and VV Piershil (1977–1979).
