= EBOH =

Dutch football club

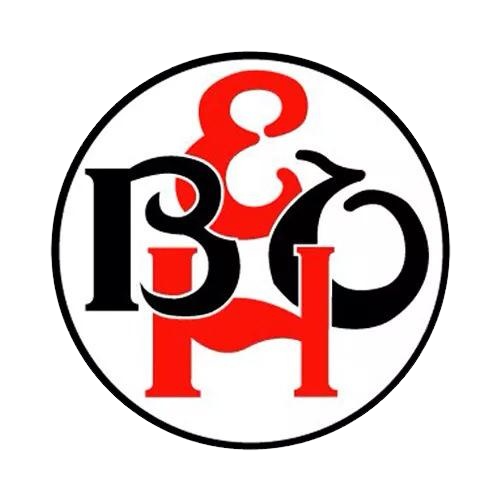
- Full name: Eendracht Brengt Ons Hoger
- Founded: 27 November 1921
- Ground: Sportpark Schenkeldijk; Dordrecht
- Chairman: Hans Schoon
- Coach: Jeffrey Monster
- League: 2e klasse E
Home colours

Eendracht Brengt Ons Hoger (EBOH) is a Dutch current amateur and former professional association football club from Dordrecht. The club was founded in 1921 and played in professional football from 1954 to 1962. Its first squad currently plays in the Tweede Klasse E (Saturday) 2024-2025.

== History ==
The club was founded on 27 November 1921 under the name Onder Vrienden Dordt (OVD). Since there was already a club registered under that name with the Dutch Football Association, the current name Eendracht Brengt Ons Hoger (EBOH) was chosen in 1924. Creator was Piet Ton.

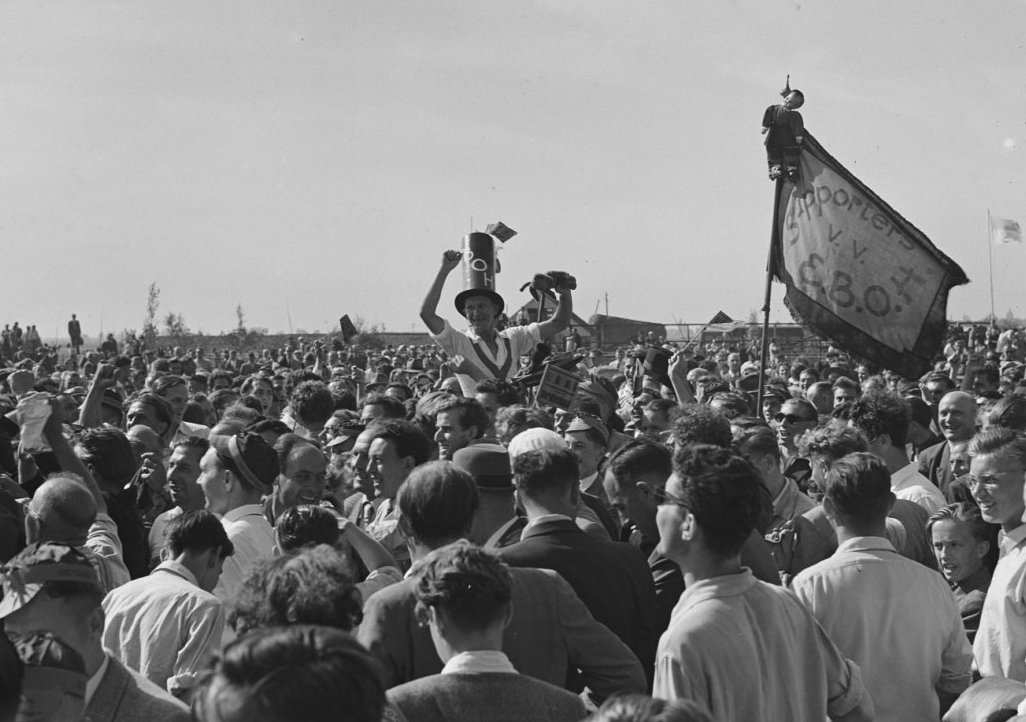
EBOH celebrating after winning the decisive match against Volendam that got it into professional football, July 5, 1953

The club peaked in the illustrious 1950s. After a decisive game against Volendam in 1953, it joined in 1954 the professional Eerste Klasse (first tier) of the KNVB. The club was still playing on Oude Straatweg with the dressing rooms next to the boardroom.

In 1954 stands were hastily added with the necessary problems. An open seat grandstand collapsed with a lot of damage, but no casualties. The canteen was built under the covered area across the street. The EBOH accommodation was made ready for about 10,000 spectators. EBOH has not been able to enjoy this accommodation for long. Due to the construction of new roads and the new sports complex Sportlaan, the club had to move to the Zuidendijk. In October 1956 the new site with a large wooden canteen on a concrete foundation was completed. A relatively small covered grandstand was erected on the opposite side and the standing stands next to the canteen, on the ends of the field and on the opposite side of the covered area, were raised with the grit of the old gasworks.

In 1973 the club moved to the current field on the Schenkeldijk, forced by the construction of the Drechttunnel. The growth district Sterrenburg was chosen. The current housing was constructed by the members.

The club first became champion in the 1923–1924 season. The club was promoted about 30 times and relegated as many times. Several cups were won, including five times the Dordtenaar Cup, which officially became the property of EBOH.

== Rivalry ==
- EBOH is the only club in the Netherlands that has won almost all professional football matches against Feyenoord and never lost against Feyenoord in a professional league match. Three wins, one draw.
- When professional football started in the Netherlands, the small city of Dordrecht surprised with three professional soccer teams. The KNVB was not amused and sought to regulate the oddity, initially by pressuring EBOH and SC Emma to unite. The clubs refused the suggestion. SC Emma withdrew first from professional soccer, EBOH held on a little longer, and FC Dordrecht (under several names) continues to play professional football to date, usually in the Eerste Divisie.

== Associated people ==
=== Managers ===
==== Sunday ====
- Joost de Bruin (19??–1941)
- Coen Delsen (1941–194?)
- Joost de Bruin (1943–1944)
- Richard Kohn (1947–1955)
- H.F. Kliphuis (1955)
- Leen Vente (1955–1956)
- Wim Molenveld (1956)
- Richard Kohn (1956–1957)
- Hugo van der Moer (1957–1960)
- Lajos Tóth (1960–1962)
- Hans de Vos (late 1960s)^
- Rein de Bruin (197?–1977)^
- Jan van Straaten (1977–197?)
- Jan Aantjes (19??–1981)
- Gerrit de Keizer (1981–198?)^
- Maarten de Keizer (19??–19??)
- Gradus Roeland (4 seasons in 1990s)
- Gerrit de Keizer (early 2000s)
- Ries Fok (2004–2009)
- Virgil Breetveld (2009–2010)
- Gradus Roeland (201?–2012)

^ Previously a player of EBOH

==== Saturday ====
- Hans de Heer & Frans van Drunen (2001–2002)
- Dik van der Sluis (2002–2003)
- Johan Bustraan (2003–2006)
- Virgil Breetveld (2006–2007)
- Mike Maastwijk (2007–2009)
- Hoessin Jouhri (2009–2011)
- Ries Fok (2011–2013)^
- Marco ten Braak (2013–2014)
- Ab van Wijk (2014–2015)
- Houssin Jouhri (2015–2017)
- Ries Fok & René Ebbers (2017–2019)
- Ries Fok (2019–2020)
- Gilbert de Wildt (since 2020)

=== Players ===
- Juul Ellerman (youth)
- Inge Barendregt
- Marco Boogers (youth)
- Bas Hijbeek
- Dick Hoogmoed
- Theo Kulsdom
- Nigel Robertha (2000s, youth)
- Cor Scheurwater
- Arie Schoon
- Jan Schoon
- Leen Visser
- Arie van der Zouwen (1980s).
