= Cor van der Gijp =

Dutch footballer (1931–2022)

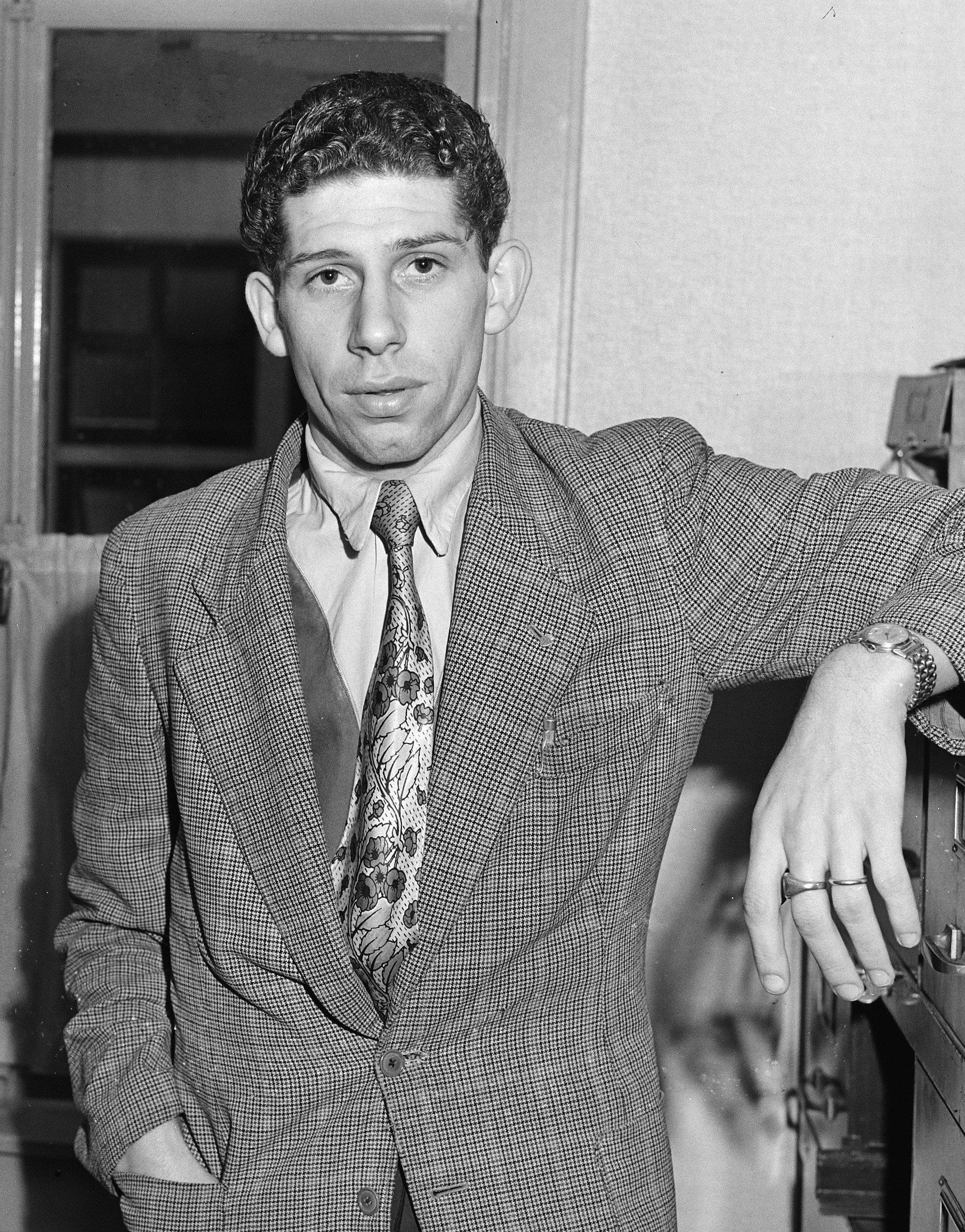
- Van der Gijp in 1954

Personal information
- Birth name: Cornelis van der Gijp
- Date of birth: 1 August 1931
- Place of birth: Dordrecht, Netherlands
- Date of death: 12 November 2022 (aged 91)
- Position: Forward

Youth career
- 1936-: Emma

Senior career*
Years	Team	Apps	(Gls)
1949?–1955	Emma		
1955–1964	Feyenoord	231	(177)
1964–1966	Blauw-Wit	26	(6)

International career
1954–1961	Netherlands	13	(6)

Managerial career
- 1967–1969: VV Hardinxveld
- 1971–1972: RVVH
- 1972–1974: Veendam
- 1980–1982: Barendrecht
- * Club domestic league appearances and goals

Cornelis van der Gijp (1 August 1931 – 12 November 2022) was a Dutch footballer who played as a forward. Van der Gijp made his professional debut at SC Emma and also played for Feyenoord and Blauw Wit.

== Club career ==
Van der Gijp made his senior debut for hometown side Emma in 1950, playing alongside his brothers Wim, Freek and Janus. He moved to Feyenoord in 1955, making his debut in 1956 to become the club's all-time top goalscorer with 177 goals in 233 league games. He played in a famous forward line alongside Henk Schouten and Coen Moulijn and won two league titles with the club.

== International career ==
Van der Gijp made his debut for the Netherlands in a March 1954 friendly match against England and earned a total of 13 caps, scoring 6 goals. His final international was an October 1961 World Cup qualification match away against Hungary.

== Managerial career ==
Van der Gijp later coached Veendam. He also held positions as technical director at Feyenoord and FC Eindhoven.

== Personal life and death ==
A center forward, Cor was an uncle of Dutch international winger René van der Gijp and spent his final years in a Dordrecht nursing home.

Van der Gijp died on 12 November 2022, at the age of 91.

== Honours ==
Feyenoord

- Eredivisie: 1960–61, 1961–62
