= Sjaak de Bruin =

Dutch footballer

Personal information
- Date of birth: 18 February 1903
- Place of birth: Rotterdam, Netherlands
- Date of death: 26 January 1969 (aged 65)
- Place of death: Rotterdam, Netherlands
- Position: Defender

Senior career*
Years	Team	Apps	(Gls)
1927–1931	Hermes DVS		

International career
1929–1930	Netherlands	3	(0)
- * Club domestic league appearances and goals

Sjaak de Bruin (18 February 1903 – 26 January 1969) was a Dutch footballer. He played in three matches for the Netherlands national football team from 1929 to 1930.

De Bruin played for Schiedam-based Hermes DVS.
