= Wim van der Gijp =

Dutch footballer

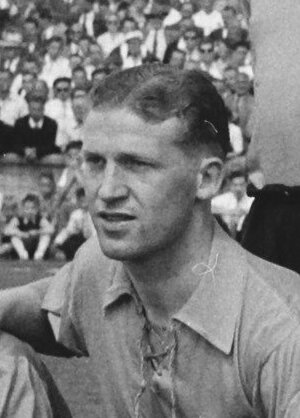
- Van der Gijp in 1954

Personal information
- Full name: Willem Gerrit van der Gijp
- Date of birth: 23 October 1928
- Place of birth: Dordrecht, Netherlands
- Date of death: 19 March 2005 (aged 76)
- Place of death: Dordrecht, Netherlands
- Position: Midfielder

Senior career*
Years	Team	Apps	(Gls)
1946–1955	Emma		
1955–1960	Sparta	127	(32)
1960–1962	DHC	66	(18)

International career
1954	Netherlands	1	(0)

Managerial career
- 1969–1973: Zwart-Wit '28
- 1972–197?: SV Gouda
- 1987–1988: Zwart-Wit '28
- * Club domestic league appearances and goals

Willem Gerrit "Wim" van der Gijp (23 October 1928 – 19 March 2005) was a Dutch football player and manager. He gained one cap for the Netherlands national team in 1954.

== Career ==
Van der Gijp started his football career alongside his younger brother Cor, at Emma in Dordrecht. In 1954, two months after his brother had made his debut, he was called up for the Netherlands national team. On 30 May 1954, he gained his only international cap in Zürich against Switzerland, which was lost 3–1. After entering professional football, Van der Gijp moved to Sparta, where he came to play in midfield. Van der Gijp would play at Sparta until 1960, where he would score 43 goals in 150 games. In 1959, Van der Gijp won the national title with Sparta. After his professional career, Van der Gijp played at amateur level for DHC from Delft.

After his active football career, Van der Gijp turned to his profession as a stamp draftsman. He was also active as a manager at various amateur clubs. In 1971, he won the Dutch national amateur championship with Zwart-Wit '28. He later also coached SV Gouda, missing out on the Eerste Klasse title in 1972.

== Personal life ==
His son René was born in 1961, who would also be capped by the Netherlands.

Wim van der Gijp died on 19 March 2005 of cardiac arrest.

== Honours ==
=== Player ===
Sparta

- Eredivisie: 1958–59

=== Manager ===
Zwart-Wit '28

- National Amateur Championship: 1971
