= Daaf Drok =

Dutch footballer

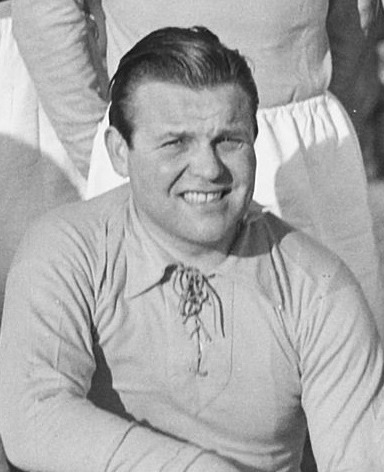

Personal information
- Full name: David Drok
- Date of birth: 23 May 1914
- Place of birth: Rotterdam, Netherlands
- Date of death: 7 March 2002 (aged 87)
- Position: Forward

Senior career*
Years	Team	Apps	(Gls)
1932–1939	RFC Rotterdam		
1939–1944	Sparta		
1944–	RFC Rotterdam		

International career
1935–1940	Netherlands	8	(4)

Managerial career
- 1953–1955: Emma
- * Club domestic league appearances and goals

David Drok (23 May 1914 – 7 March 2002) was a Dutch football forward who played for the Netherlands in the 1938 FIFA World Cup.

== Club career ==
He played for hometown clubs RFC Rotterdam and Sparta Rotterdam. He was nicknamed Daaf Dronk (Dave Drink), since he owned a bar in Rotterdam.

== International career ==
Drok made his debut for the Netherlands in a February 1935 friendly match against Germany and earned a total number of 8 caps, scoring 4 goals. His final international was in March 1940 against Luxembourg.
