= Joop van Nellen =

Dutch footballer

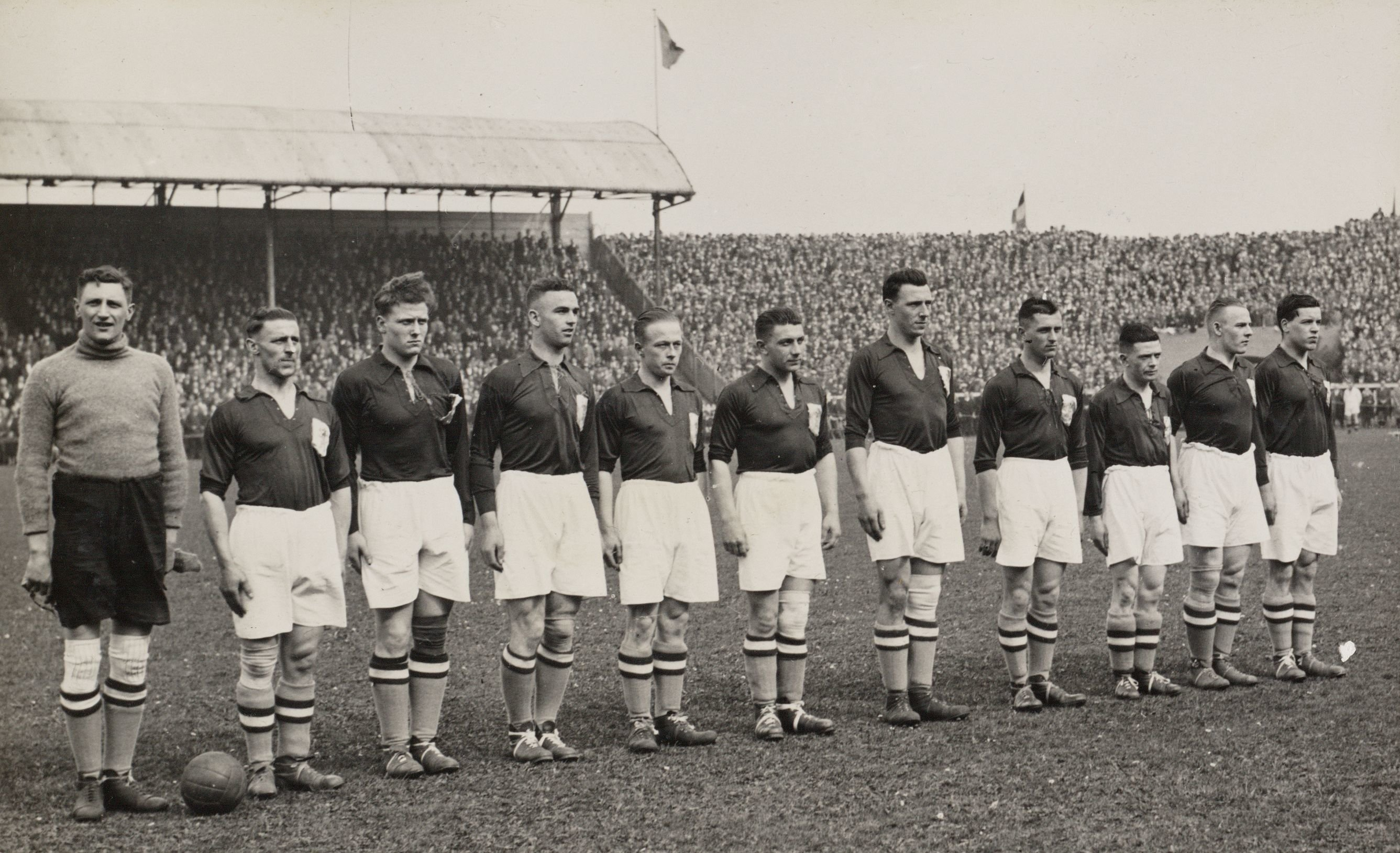
- Van Nellen (far right), Netherlands national team 1933

Personal information
- Full name: Johannes Cornelis van Nellen
- Date of birth: 15 March 1910
- Place of birth: Delft, Netherlands
- Date of death: 14 November 1992 (aged 82)
- Place of death: Delft, Netherlands
- Position: Forward

Senior career*
Years	Team	Apps	(Gls)
- DHC Delft

International career
1928–1937	Netherlands	27	(7)
- * Club domestic league appearances and goals

Johannes Cornelis "Joop" van Nellen (15 March 1910 – 14 November 1992) was a Dutch football forward who played for Netherlands in the 1934 FIFA World Cup. He also played for DHC Delft.
