= Hermes DVS =

Dutch omnisport club

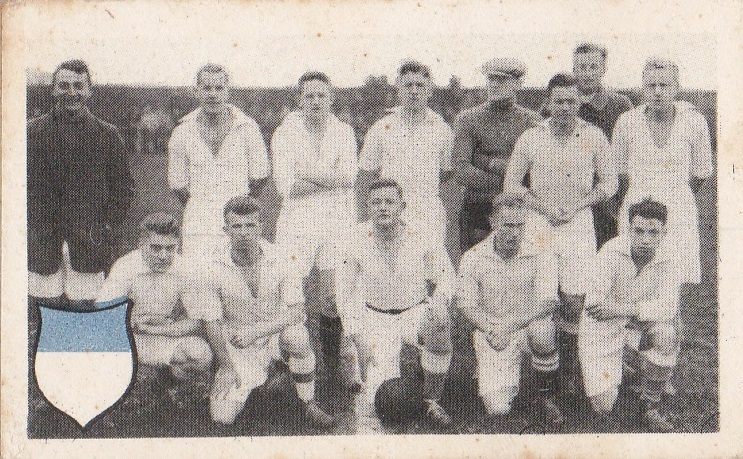
Hermes DVS (1931)

Hermes DVS is a Dutch omnisport club based in Schiedam. The club has football, cricket, squash and rugby departments.

== History ==
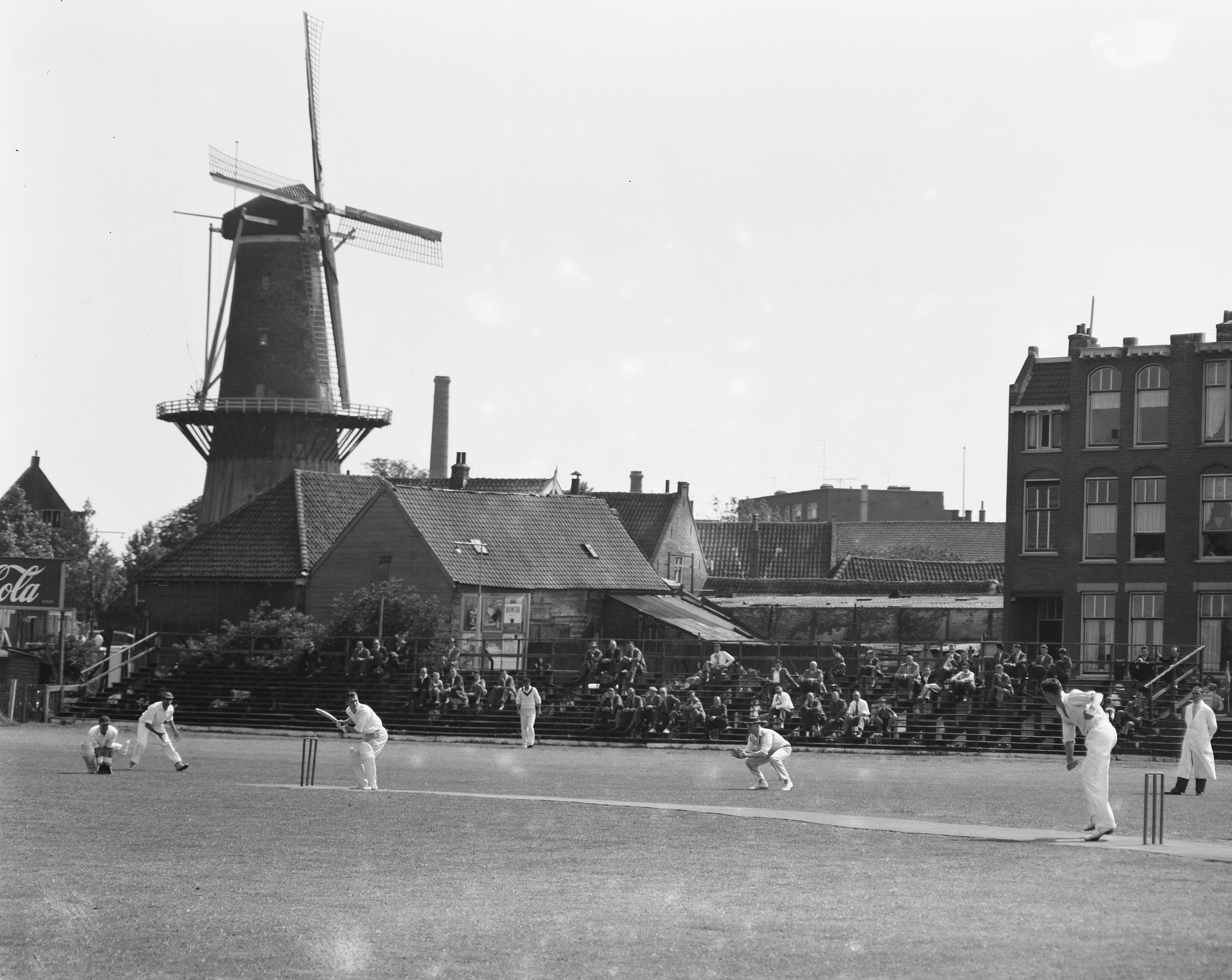
Hermes DVS against ACC (1957) on the former ground of Hermes DVS Nieuwe Damlaan

The club was founded on 8 April 1884. It was a runner-up in the 1951–52 Netherlands Football League Championship. Hermes DVS won the national cricket title in 1938 and 1946, and the women's team won the title in 2014

== Former football players ==
=== National team players ===
The following players were called up to represent their national teams in international football and received caps during their tenure with Hermes DVS:

- (Netherlands) Sjaak de Bruin (1929–1931)
- (Netherlands) Jan van Buijtenen (1937–1954)
- (Netherlands) Jaap van de Griend (1924–1932)
- (Netherlands) Frans van der Klink (1950–1951)
- (Netherlands) Cock van der Tuijn (1942–1962)

- Years in brackets indicate careerspan with Hermes DVS.
