= Leen Vente =

Dutch footballer (1911–1989)

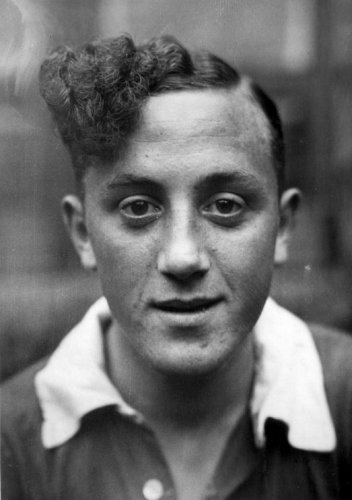
- Vente in 1935

Personal information
- Full name: Leendert Roelof Jan Vente
- Date of birth: 14 May 1911
- Place of birth: Rotterdam, Netherlands
- Date of death: 9 November 1989 (aged 78)
- Place of death: Rotterdam, Netherlands
- Position: Striker

Youth career
- Semper Melior
- Pro Patria

Senior career*
| Years | Team | Apps | (Gls) |
| 1928–1936 | Neptunus | | |
| 1936–1941 | Feijenoord | 82 | (65) |
| 1941–1948 | Neptunus | | |

International career
| 1933–1940 | Netherlands | 21 | (19) |

Managerial career
- 1950–1954: NOAD
- 1955–1956: EBOH
- 1956–1957: VOC
- 1957: Xerxes
- 1958–1959: Neptunus
- 1959–1960: Slikkerveer
- MSV en AV Flakkee
- * Club domestic league appearances and goals

Leendert Roelof Jan "Leen" Vente (14 May 1911 – 9 November 1989) was a Dutch footballer who played as a striker. He earned 21 caps and scored 19 goals for the Netherlands national football team, and played in the 1934 and 1938 World Cups.

== Playing career ==
Vente started in the Rotterdam Football Association for Semper Melior and later for Pro Patria. He eventually joined Neptunus where he initially also participated in athletics.

In April 1936, Vente moved to Feyenoord. He was one of the players that participated in the opening match of stadium De Kuip in 1937. Feyenoord played Beerschot and won 5–2. Vente scored the first ever goal in the stadium, and finished the game with a hat-trick. Vente would finish his tenure with the club with 82 league appearances in which he scored 65 goals.

In January 1941, Vente returned to Neptunus.

== After retirement ==
In 1943, Vente obtained his coaching licence. He started his managerial career in 1950 with NOAD. He then coached both EBOH and VOC. He had a short term as manager of Xerxes in 1957. After that he coached, among others, Neptunus and SV Slikkerveer. Vente also worked as a representative during that period.

Vente owned café Leen Vente three times. He lost his second café during the German bombing of Rotterdam. After World War II, he was detained by the "Political Investigation Service" on charges of recruiting from his café, but was soon rehabilitated. Vente turned out to have prevented collaboration with the Axis powers.

== Personal life ==
Vente died on 9 November 1989 in Rotterdam.

His brother's grandson, Dylan Vente, plays for Heerenveen and started his career with Feyenoord.

== Career statistics ==
=== International ===
Appearances and goals by national team and year
| National team | Year | Apps | Goals |
|---|---|---|---|
| Netherlands | 1934 | 7 | 9 |
| Netherlands | 1935 | 2 | 0 |
| Netherlands | 1937 | 2 | 1 |
| Netherlands | 1938 | 4 | 2 |
| Netherlands | 1939 | 4 | 6 |
| Netherlands | 1940 | 2 | 1 |
| Total | | 21 | 19 |

Scores and results list Netherlands' goal tally first, score column indicates score after each Vente goal.

List of international goals scored by Leen Vente
| No. | Date | Venue | Opponent | Score | Result | Competition | Ref. |
|---|---|---|---|---|---|---|---|
| 1 | 11 March 1934 | Olympisch Stadion, Antwerp, Belgium | Belgium | 3–1 | 9–3 | Friendly | |
| 2 | 11 March 1934 | Olympisch Stadion, Antwerp, Belgium | Belgium | 5–2 | 9–3 | Friendly | |
| 3 | 11 March 1934 | Olympisch Stadion, Antwerp, Belgium | Belgium | 6–2 | 9–3 | Friendly | |
| 4 | 11 March 1934 | Olympisch Stadion, Antwerp, Belgium | Belgium | 8–2 | 9–3 | Friendly | |
| 5 | 11 March 1934 | Olympisch Stadion, Antwerp, Belgium | Belgium | 9–3 | 9–3 | Friendly | |
| 6 | 8 April 1934 | Olympic Stadium, Amsterdam, Netherlands | Irish Free State | 4–2 | 5–2 | 1934 FIFA World Cup qualification | |
| 7 | 29 April 1934 | Bosuilstadion, Antwerp, Belgium | Belgium | 3–1 | 4–2 | 1934 FIFA World Cup qualification | |
| 8 | 10 May 1934 | Olympic Stadium, Amsterdam, Netherlands | France | 1–0 | 4–5 | Friendly | |
| 9 | 27 May 1934 | San Siro, Milan, Italy | Switzerland | 2–3 | 2–3 | 1934 FIFA World Cup | |
| 10 | 2 May 1937 | De Kuip, Rotterdam, Netherlands | Belgium | 1–0 | 1–0 | Friendly | |
| 11 | 27 February 1938 | De Kuip, Rotterdam, Netherlands | Belgium | 6–2 | 7–2 | Friendly | |
| 12 | 21 May 1938 | Olympic Stadium, Amsterdam, Netherlands | Scotland | 1–3 | 1–3 | Friendly | |
| 13 | 26 February 1939 | De Kuip, Rotterdam, Netherlands | Hungary | 1–1 | 3–2 | Friendly | |
| 14 | 26 February 1939 | De Kuip, Rotterdam, Netherlands | Hungary | 2–1 | 3–2 | Friendly | |
| 15 | 19 March 1939 | Bosuilstadion, Antwerp, Belgium | Belgium | 1–1 | 4–5 | Friendly | |
| 16 | 19 March 1939 | Bosuilstadion, Antwerp, Belgium | Belgium | 4–4 | 4–5 | Friendly | |
| 17 | 23 April 1939 | Olympic Stadium, Amsterdam, Netherlands | Belgium | 2–1 | 3–2 | Friendly | |
| 18 | 23 April 1939 | Olympic Stadium, Amsterdam, Netherlands | Belgium | 3–2 | 3–2 | Friendly | |
| 19 | 21 April 1940 | Olympic Stadium, Amsterdam, Netherlands | Belgium | 4–0 | 4–2 | Friendly | |

== Honours ==
Feyenoord

- Netherlands Football League Championship: 1937–38, 1939–40
