= Cock van der Tuijn =

Dutch footballer

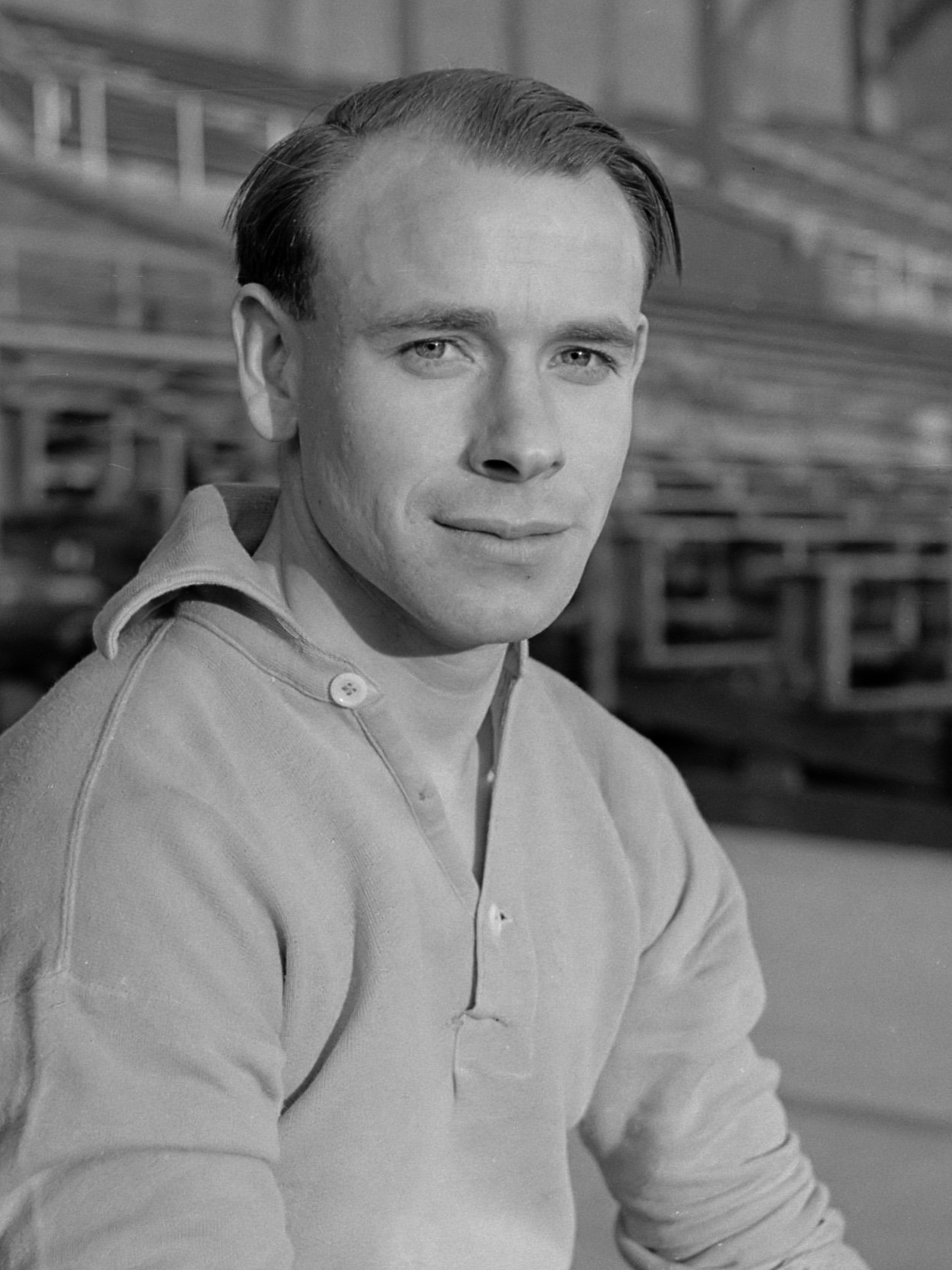
- Van der Tuijn in 1951

Personal information
- Full name: Cornelis van der Tuijn
- Date of birth: 24 July 1924
- Place of birth: Schiedam, Netherlands
- Date of death: 23 August 1974 (aged 50)
- Place of death: Schiedam, Netherlands
- Position: Winger

Senior career*
Years	Team	Apps	(Gls)
1941–1962	Hermes DVS		

International career
1948–1952	Netherlands	11	(2)
- * Club domestic league appearances and goals

Cornelis "Cock" van der Tuijn (24 July 1924 – 23 August 1974) was a Dutch footballer. He competed in the men's tournament at the 1948 Summer Olympics. and the Helsinki Summer Olympics 1952.
