= Virgil Breetveld =

Dutch footballer and coach

Personal information
- Date of birth: 10 July 1967 (age 59)
- Place of birth: Rotterdam, Netherlands
- Position: Striker

Youth career
- Steeds Hooger
- Germinal (Schiebroek)
- Feyenoord

Senior career*
Years	Team	Apps	(Gls)
1987–1988	Feyenoord	4	(0)
1988–1991	SVV	84	(15)
1991–1994	Dordrecht '90	69	(30)
1994–1998	De Graafschap	72	(16)
1998–1999	Excelsior	29	(14)
1999–2000	Fortuna Düsseldorf	12	(0)
Total		270	(75)

Managerial career
- 2003–2005: SC Reeland
- 2006–2007: EBOH (Sunday)
- 2009–2010: EBOH (Saturday)
- 2011–2013: Wieldrecht
- 2011–2012: Dordrecht (assistant)
- 2012: Dordrecht (interim)
- 2012–2013: Dordrecht (assistant)
- 2013: Dordrecht (interim)
- 2013–2017: SteDoCo
- 2017–2019: IFC
- * Club domestic league appearances and goals

Virgil Breetveld (born 10 July 1967) is a Dutch football coach and former professional player.

== Playing career ==
Born in Rotterdam, Breetveld played youth football for Steeds Hooger and Germinal Schiebroek, before signing for Feyenoord at the age of 17. Breetveld had not considered a professional football career, but was encouraged to pursue it by his coach Dick Beek, who himself had been a professional player. He made his debut for the first-team in April 1988. He later played for SVV, Dordrecht, De Graafschap, Excelsior and Fortuna Düsseldorf. He was top scorer of the Eerste Divisie in the 1994–95 season. He retired from professional football in November 2000.

== Coaching career ==
After retiring as a player, Breetveld worked as a broker and let holiday apartments in Brazil. He was also manager of amateur side SC Reeland from 2003 to 2005, as well as EBOH and Wieldrecht.

He became an assistant manager at Dordrecht after signing a one-year contract in May 2011, combining his role there with his position as manager of Wieldrecht, and working 6 days a week in both roles. He signed a contract extension with Dordrecht in April 2012. He left his role with Dordrecht in 2013, and in September 2014 was working as manager of amateur team SteDoCo. In May 2017, Breetveld finished his employment at Stedoco. In the summer of 2017 he was appointed coach of the Sunday and Saturday first squads of Ido's Football Club, only to be dismissed in March 2019.
