= Jaap van de Griend =

Dutch footballer (1904–1970)

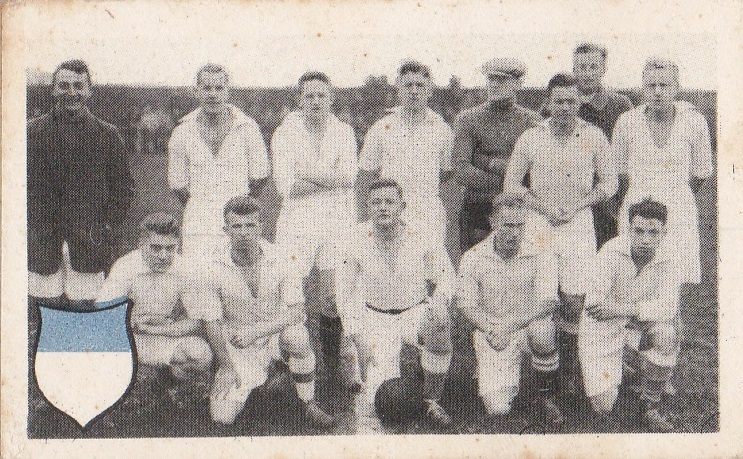
- Dutch football club Hermes DVS (HDVS Schiedam) in 1931

Personal information
- Full name: Jacob van de Griend
- Date of birth: 24 January 1904
- Place of birth: Vlaardingen, Netherlands
- Date of death: 27 November 1970 (aged 66)
- Place of death: Schiedam, Netherlands
- Position: Striker

Senior career*
| Years | Team | Apps | (Gls) |
| 1927-1930 | Hermes DVS | | |

International career
| 1928–1929 | Netherlands | 5 | (0) |
- * Club domestic league appearances and goals

Jaap van de Griend (24 January 1904 – 27 November 1970) was a Dutch footballer. He played in five matches for the Netherlands national football team in 1928 and 1929.

Van de Griend was one of only 5 Hermes DVS players who played for the Oranje.
