= Jan van Buijtenen =

Dutch footballer (1920–1976)

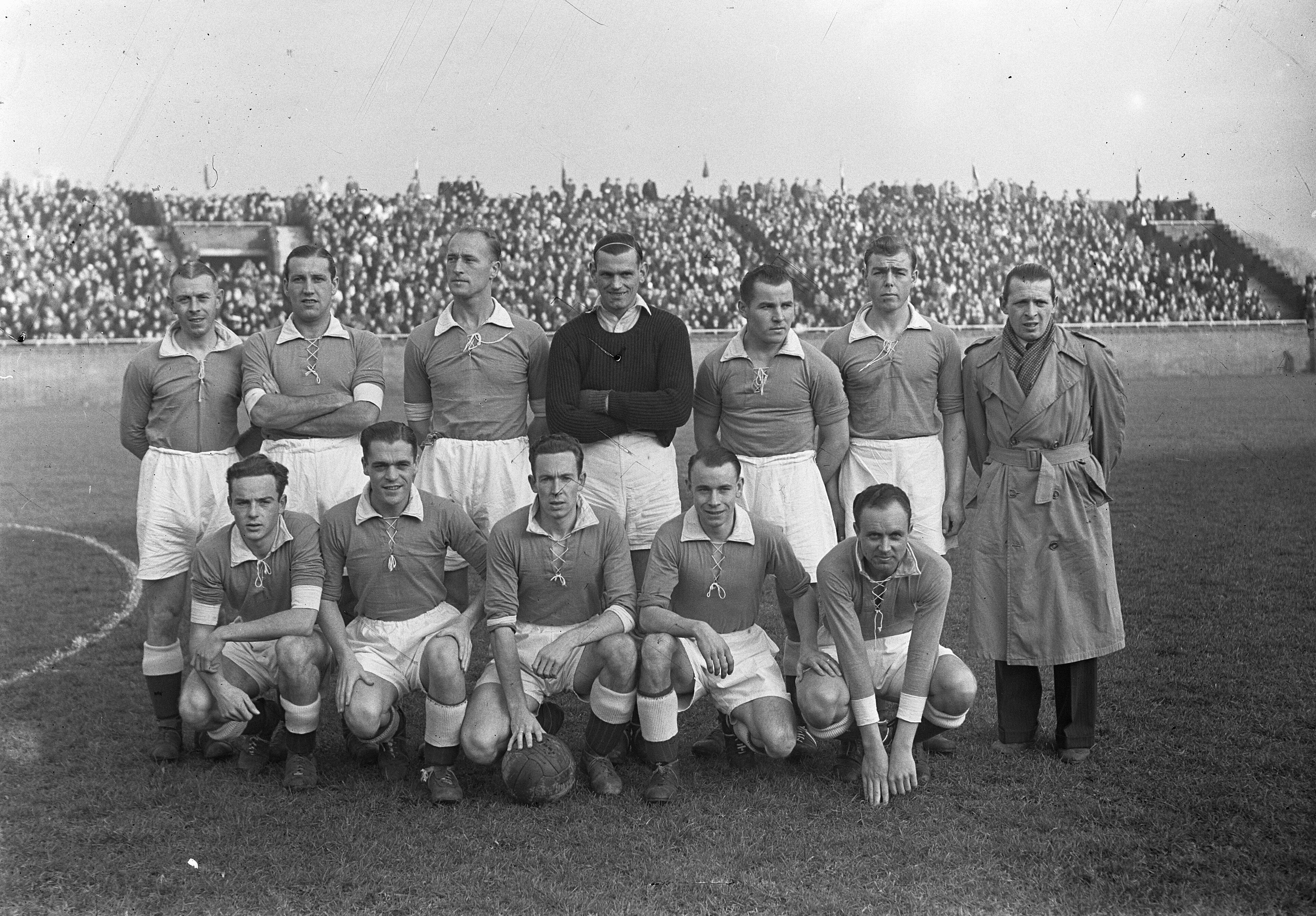
- Van Buijtenen, standing 3rd from the right, at Hermes DVS in 1947

Personal information
- Date of birth: 8 January 1920
- Place of birth: Schiedam, Netherlands
- Date of death: 19 January 1976 (aged 56)
- Place of death: Rozenburg, Netherlands
- Position: Defender

Senior career*
Years	Team	Apps	(Gls)
1937–1954	Hermes DVS		

International career
1946	Netherlands	1	(0)

Managerial career
- 1956–1957: Xerxes
- 1957–1958: Emma
- 1958–1960: DHC
- 1960–1961: Xerxes
- 1964–1965: VELO
- 1967–1970: ONA
- 1970–1971: Excelsior Maassluis
- * Club domestic league appearances and goals

Jan van Buijtenen (8 January 1920 – 19 January 1976) was a Dutch footballer. He played in one match for the Netherlands national football team, their first one after World War II, in 1946 against Luxembourg.

Born in Schiedam, van Buijtenen played for local club Hermes DVS.
