= Mitchell van der Gaag =

Dutch footballer and coach

Personal information
- Full name: Mitchell van der Gaag
- Date of birth: 22 October 1971 (age 55)
- Place of birth: Zutphen, Netherlands
- Height: 1.86 m (6 ft 1 in)
- Position: Centre-back

Youth career
- SC Brummen
- De Graafschap
- 1986–1989: PSV

Senior career*
Years	Team	Apps	(Gls)
1989–1995	PSV	44	(4)
1989–1990	→ NEC (loan)	10	(2)
1990–1992	→ Sparta (loan)	55	(4)
1995–1997	Motherwell	42	(8)
1997–2001	Utrecht	99	(11)
2001–2006	Marítimo	154	(18)
2006–2007	Al Nassr	27	(3)
Total		431	(50)

International career
1986	Netherlands U15	2	(1)
1988	Netherlands U17	3	(0)
1988-1989	Netherlands U19	4	(0)
1993	Netherlands U21	3	(0)

Managerial career
- 2008–2009: Marítimo B
- 2009–2010: Marítimo
- 2012–2013: Belenenses
- 2015: Ermis
- 2015–2016: Eindhoven
- 2016–2018: Excelsior
- 2018–2019: NAC
- 2019–2021: Jong Ajax
- 2025: Zürich
- 2026–: Marítimo
- * Club domestic league appearances and goals

Mitchell van der Gaag (born 22 October 1971) is a Dutch professional football coach and former player who played as a centre-back. He is currently in his second spell as head coach of Primeira Liga side Marítimo.

He made 208 Eredivisie appearances, scoring 19 goals, for NEC, Sparta Rotterdam, PSV and Utrecht. Abroad, he had spells at Motherwell in the Scottish Premier League and Marítimo in Portugal's Primeira Liga, playing 174 total games for the latter and scoring 19 times.

As a manager, van der Gaag led several teams including Marítimo and Belenenses in Portugal, as well as Excelsior and NAC in his country.

== Playing career ==
=== Club ===
Van der Gaag was born in Zutphen and raised in Brummen, Gelderland. After graduating from PSV Eindhoven's youth academy, he spent three seasons on loan to NEC Nijmegen and Sparta Rotterdam, returning to Eindhoven in 1992. He went on to play 50 games for the PSV first team, alongside the likes of Luc Nilis, Romário and Ronaldo.

In March 1995, van der Gaag signed with Motherwell for £400,000. He made his debut for Alex McLeish's side on 1 April 1995, in a 1–1 draw against Celtic, however his season was brought to a premature end with an injury in his second match against Partick Thistle. He scored a career-best seven goals in 28 games in his second full season to help the Steelmen narrowly avoid relegation from the Scottish Premier Division, and subsequently returned to the Eredivisie with Utrecht.

For the 2001–02 campaign, van der Gaag joined Portugal's Marítimo, going on to be one of the Madeira club's most influential players as it consolidated in the Primeira Liga. He scored six times in 2003–04, helping the team finish sixth and qualify for the UEFA Cup.

=== International ===
Van der Gaag played 3 matches for the Netherlands national under-21 football team and 4 for the U19s.

== Coaching career ==
Van der Gaag retired from football in 2007, having spent one season with Al Nassr in Saudi Arabia. In July of the following year, he returned to Marítimo as a coach and took the reins of its B team.

In October 2009, after Carlos Carvalhal's dismissal following a string of bad results, van der Gaag was promoted to the main squad. After helping them finish fifth – a place conquered in the last round with a 2–1 away win against Vitória de Guimarães, who were leapfrogged in the process – and qualify for the Europa League, his contract was renewed for a further year.

On 14 September 2010, after collecting only one point in the league's first four matches and being ousted by BATE in the Europa League, van der Gaag was sacked by Marítimo. He returned to management after nearly two years, still in Portugal, signing with Segunda Liga side Belenenses. In his first season, he won the league, thus returning the club to the top flight after three years.

Van der Gaag took a temporary leave of absence in late September 2013 due to heart problems, after feeling unwell during a league game against former side Marítimo (1–0 home win). In February 2015, he was appointed at Ermis Aradippou of the Cypriot First Division, being released after just one month after refusing to renew his contract for the following campaign.

After spending the 2015–16 season back in his country with FC Eindhoven, in the Eerste Divisie, van der Gaag moved to the top flight and successively coached Excelsior and NAC Breda. On 24 May 2019, he returned to the former tier after signing a two-year deal at Ajax's reserves.

Van der Gaag was appointed assistant manager of the first team of on 1 June 2021, replacing the departing Christian Poulsen. His position at the reserves was filled by John Heitinga, who had previously worked in the youth academy.

On 23 May 2022, Van der Gaag was confirmed as assistant head coach of Manchester United, along with Steve McClaren, to work with first team head coach Erik ten Hag, who he previously worked with at Ajax.

On 26 November 2023, in a Premier league match against Everton at Goodison Park, with Erik Ten Hag suspended, Van der Gaag was the coach on the sidelines as Manchester United won 3-0.

Following a coaching staff overhaul, Van der Gaag departed his role with Manchester United on 9 July 2024 to pursue a head coach position at a different club.

On 31 May 2025, he was announced as the new head coach of FC Zürich, signing a two-year contract. He was dismissed on 23 October 2025, after five months in charge. In June 2026, van der Gaag returned to his former club Marítimo for a second spell as head coach, signing a two-year contract until June 2028.

== Personal life ==
Van der Gaag's father Wim was also a footballer, who was one of the first professionals in the Netherlands in 1954. His sons Jordan and Luca also went into the game, representing Belenenses.

== Managerial statistics ==
As of 21 November 2026

Managerial record by team and tenure
Team	Nat	From	To	Record				
Team	Nat	From	To	G	W	D	L	Win %
Zürich	(Switzerland)	31 May 2025	23 October 2025	11	5	2	4	45.45
Marítimo	(Portugal)	15 June 2026	Present	13	3	3	7	23.08
Total				24	8	5	11	33.33

== Honours ==
=== Player ===
PSV

- Dutch Supercup: 1992

=== Manager ===
Belenenses

- Segunda Liga: 2012–13
