= Drechttunnel =

Tunnel in the Netherlands

Coordinates: 51.8094°N 4.6478°E

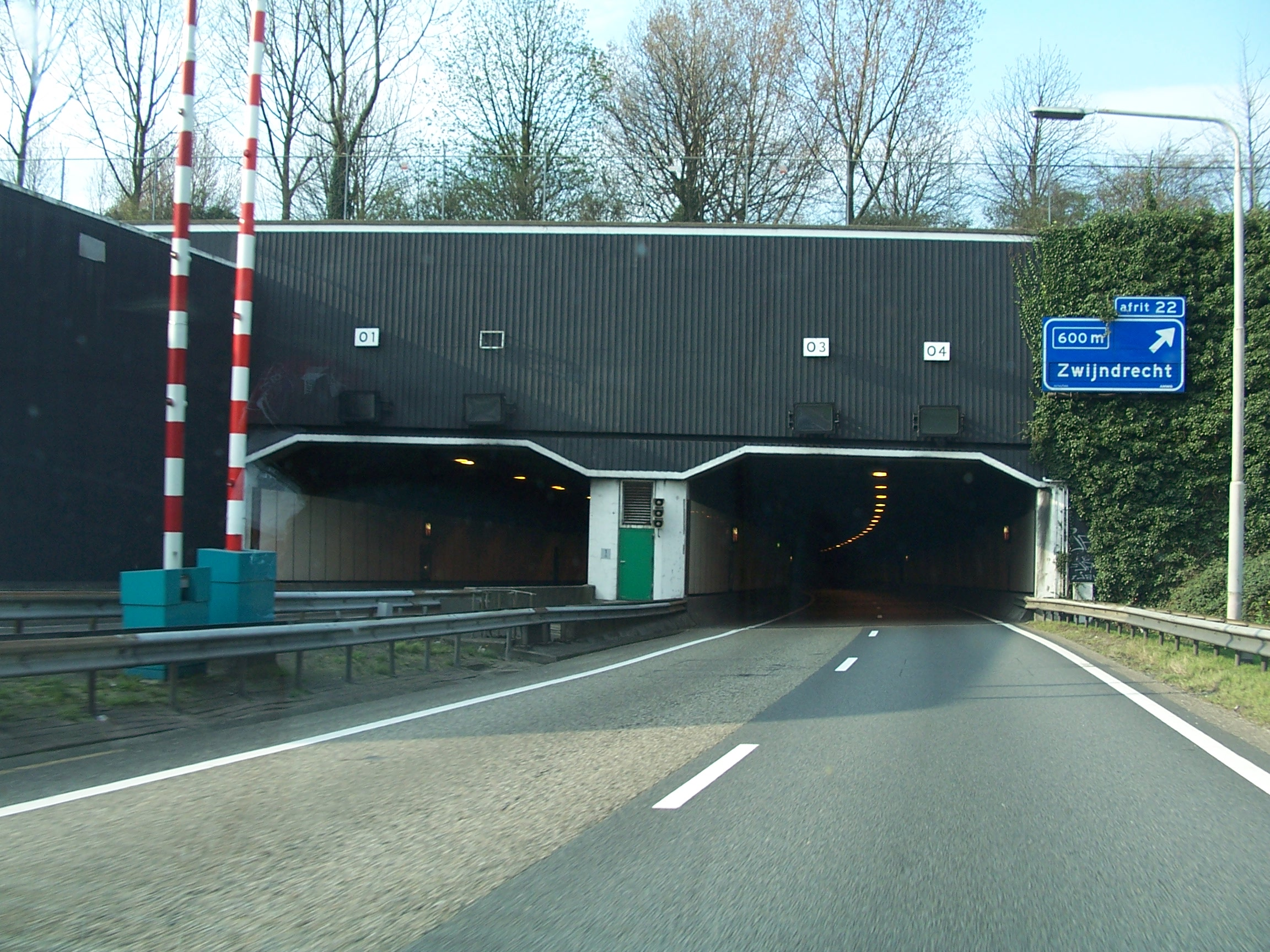
Drechttunnel

The Drechttunnel is an underground motorway tunnel in Netherlands used by 155,000 motorists a day. It connects Dordrecht and Zwijndrecht and is often used for international freight transport. The tunnel has 4 tubes including 8 lanes. The tunnel is part of A16. Length of the tunnel is 823m. Construction of the tunnel started in 1961.

In 2026 a contract of €233 million was awarded for the renovation of the tunnel, to replace technical installations and restore the ceiling, with preparatory works set to begin in 2028 and main renovations lasting until 2030. Martin Wijnen, the director of Rijkswaterstaat, maintains that inconvenience to road users should be limited.

== Exits near the tunnel ==
Municipality	Name	Number
Dordrecht	Dordrecht-Centrum	21
Zwijndrecht	Zwijndrecht	22
Hendrik-Ido-Ambacht	Hendrik-Ido-Ambacht	23

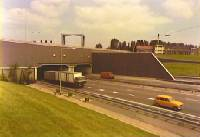
Drechttunnel
