= SC Emma =

Dutch football club

- Full name: Sportclub Emma
- Founded: 1 May 1911
- Ground: Sportpark Reeweg, Dordrecht, Netherlands
- Chairman: Leo Teunissen
- Manager: Roy de Bruijn
- League: Derde Klasse
- 2018–19: Vierde Klasse 1st
- Website: https://www.scemma.nl/
Home colours

Sportclub Emma is an association football club from Dordrecht, Netherlands. Its first squad plays in the Derde Klasse since 2019. Its colors are red and blue.

== History ==
=== 1910s–1930s: Foundation and the early years ===
SC Emma was founded on 1 May 1911. In the 1930–1931 season it played in the Derde Klasse D of the KNVB.

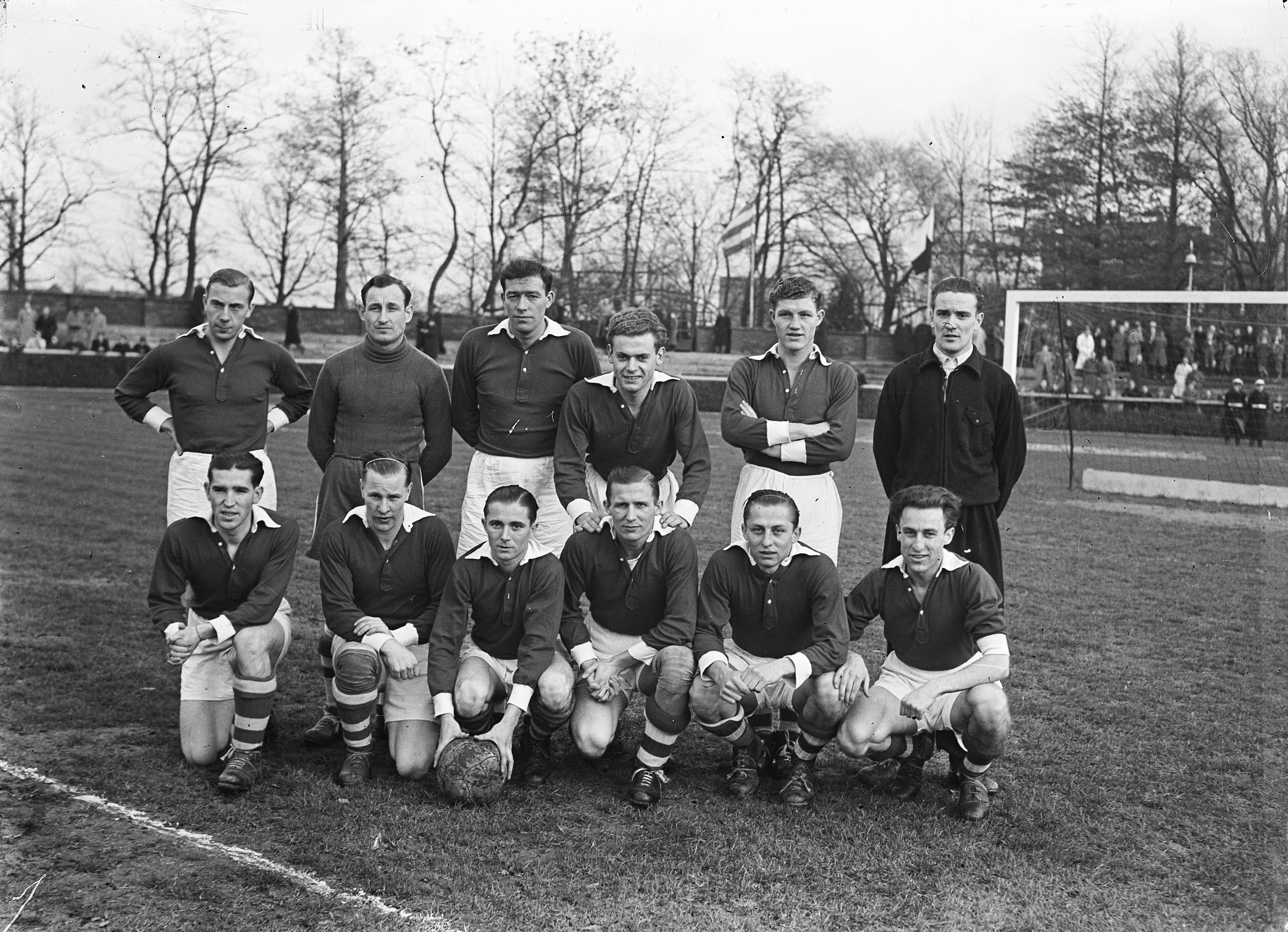
SC Emma in Eindhoven on 28 November 1947, before a match against PSV Eindhoven

=== 1940s–1950s: Eerste Klasse and professional football ===
In September 1940, four months after the Nazis occupied the Netherlands, Emma beat VIOS 10–0. SC Emma promoted to the Dutch top tier, at that time the Eerste Klasse, in 1941. In 1946 it returned to the Tweede Klasse and in 1950 it promoted again to the Eerste.

From 1954 to 1958, beginning when the Eerste Klasse turned professional, it played four seasons of pro football. The professional leagues were under development during these years, so it played every year in another league: Eerste Klasse then Hoofdklasse, both as tier 1, the Eerste Divisie (tier 2) and finally Tweede Divisie (tier 3).

Their most famous players were the brothers Cor, Freek, Janus and Wim and their cousin Jur. Alongside played Wim van der Gaag and Leen Hubert. Cor van der Gijp had 13 caps on the Dutch national team and was sold for 18,000 guilders to Feyenoord. After its best players left and under the pressure of the KNVB, who were concerned about the long-term viability of three professional football clubs from one town, SC Emma relegated to lower leagues (EBOH left professional football in 1962 and FC Dordrecht continues, usually in the Eerste Divisie).

=== 1960s–1980s: Back to amateur football and gradual decline ===
Going back to amateur football wasn't easy on SC Emma. In November 1960 Emma stood dead-last in the Eerste Klasse, having played one more game than all other teams, and were beaten 6–2 by ONA Gouda. In the season of 1971–72, Emma already played in the Tweede Klasse D. In the season of 1977–78, it could be found in the Derde Klasse D. In 1988, Emma filed a protest against relegation to the Derde Klasse.

=== 1990s–2010s: Vierde Klasse, merging and name revisions ===
In 1994–95 Emma played in the Vierde Klasse. Decades of gradual decline and relegation led to difficulties in team staging, finance, and membership. In 1997 Emma merged with two other clubs from Dordrecht, ASW and ODS. The new name was Sportclub Reeland, after the neighborhood that was its home base. In 2007, as SC Reeland rebranded itself SC Emma, ODS left for new independence, then merged in 2013 with another fusion club from Dordrecht, GSC.

Between 1998 and 2019, SC Reeland turned SC Emma played predominantly in the Vierde Klasse, except for three single seasons in the Vijfde Klasse and one in the Derde Klasse, always immediately bouncing back. In 2009 the promotion came after a Vierde Klasse section championship, in 2014 likewise in the Vijfde Klasse. Also in 2014, Emma lost 16–0 to Dordrecht neighbor VV Wieldrecht that played in the particular season two tiers higher. In the summer of 2019 SC Emma promoted to the Derde Klasse after it won a Vierde Klasse section championship.

=== 2020s: Derde Klasse ===
With the results of the 2019–20 season cancelled due to the COVID-19 pandemic in the Netherlands, Emma remained in the Derde Klasse until summer 2021.

== Historical list of coaches ==
- 1952–1953: (Austria) Richard Kohn
- 1953–1955: (Netherlands) Daaf Drok
- 1955–1956: (Netherlands) Bob Janse
- 1956–1957: (Netherlands) Piet de Wolf
- 1957–1958: (Netherlands) Jan van Buijtenen
- 2003–2005: (Netherlands) Virgil Breetveld (as SC Reeland)
- 2005–2008: (Netherlands) Marco ten Braak (partially as SC Reeland)
- 2008–2010: (Netherlands) René Hiddink
- 2010–2011: (Netherlands) Marco ten Braak
- 2011–2015: (Netherlands) Hoessin Jouhri
- 2015–2017: (Netherlands) Egon Bergmans
- Since 2017: (Netherlands) Roy de Bruijn

=== Top Scorers ===
- 1954–55: Cor van der Gijp (12)
- 1955–56: Wim van der Gaag and Janus van der Gijp (7)
- 1957–58: Leen Hubert (13)
