= Frans van der Klink =

Dutch footballer

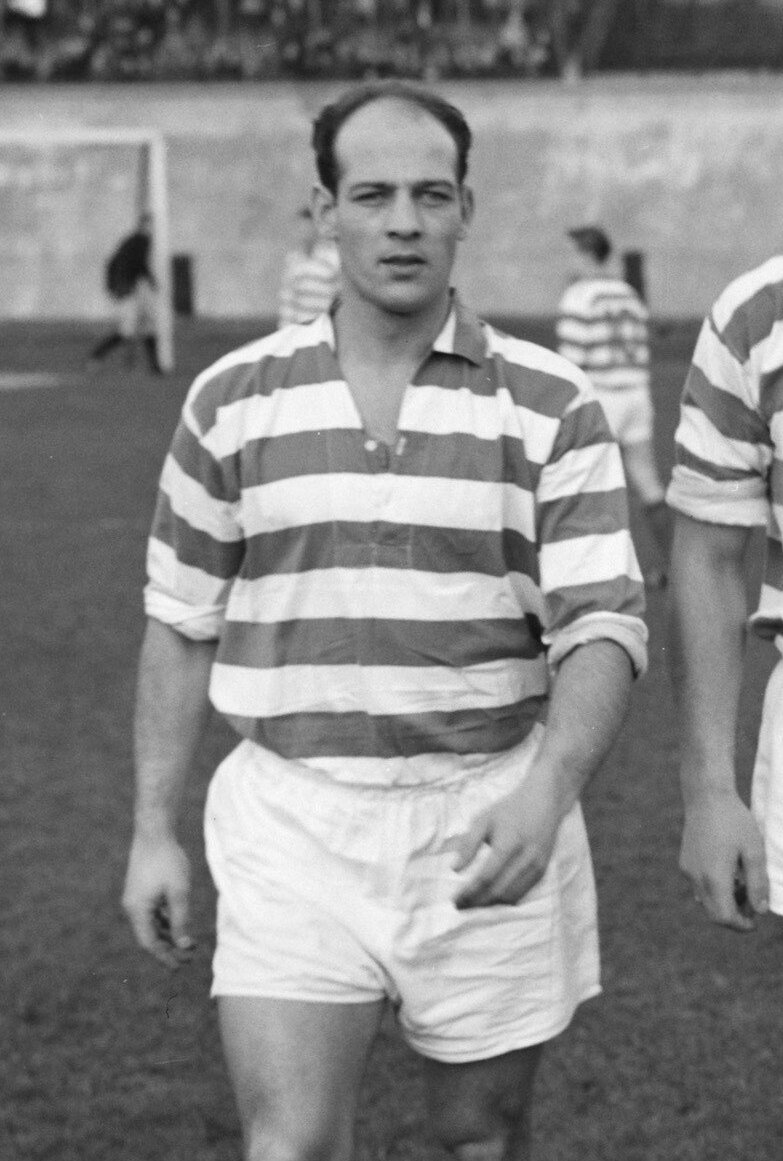
- van der Klink with Blauw-Wit in 1960

Personal information
- Date of birth: 11 June 1928
- Date of death: 14 August 1976 (aged 48)

International career
Years	Team	Apps	(Gls)
1950	Netherlands	1	(0)

Frans van der Klink (11 June 1928 – 14 August 1976) was a Dutch footballer. He played in one match for the Netherlands national football team in 1950.
