= Anna van der Gaag =

Health care professional

Anna van der Gaag CBE FRCSLT
- Occupation: Speech therapist

Academic background
- Education: University of Strathclyde
- Thesis: Evaluating the communication skills of adults with learning disabilities (2000)

Anna Danielle van der Gaag CBE is a speech and language therapist and academic. She is visiting professor in ethics and regulation at the University of Surrey and former chair of the Health and Care Professions Council.

== Career ==
Van der Gaag taught at the University of Strathclyde, was a senior researcher at the University of Oxford and at the Queen Margaret University. From 2006 to 2008 she was a member of the Council for Healthcare Regulatory Excellence. From 2006 to 2015 she was chair of the Health and Care Professions Council.

In 2019 she was appointed chair of the Responsible Gambling Strategy Board.

== Awards ==
Van der Gaag was awarded an honorary degree from Birmingham City University. She was appointed a CBE in the 2015 New Year Honours for services to health and care.

== Select publications ==
- Van der Gaag, A. 1988. The communication assessment profile for adults with a mental handicap. London, Speech Profiles.
- Van der Gaag, A. and Dormandy, K. 1993. Communication and learning disabilities: new map of an old country. London, Whurr publishers.
- Van der Gaag, A. 1999. The early communication audit manual : a talking toolkit. London, Royal College of Speech and Language Therapists.
- Van der Gaag, A. 2004. CASP : the communication assessment profile. Glasgow, Speech Profiles.
- Anderson, C. and Van der Gaag, A. 2005. Speech and language therapy: issues in professional practice
