= Eef Ruisch =

Dutch footballer (106–1976)

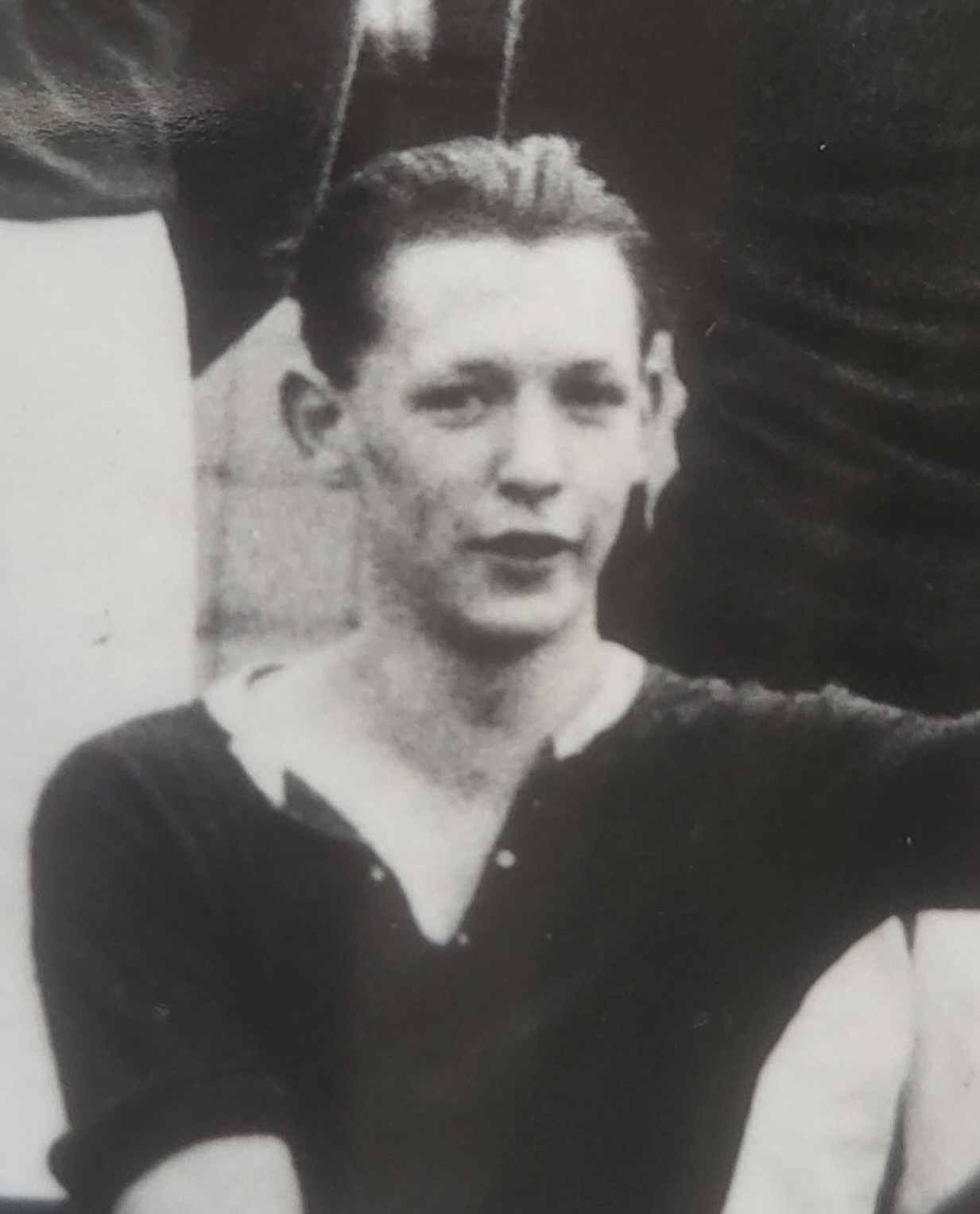

Personal information
- Date of birth: 26 July 1906
- Date of death: 24 October 1976 (aged 70)

International career
Years	Team	Apps	(Gls)
1926–1928	Netherlands	7	(2)

Eef Ruisch (26 July 1906 – 24 October 1976) was a Dutch footballer. He played in seven matches for the Netherlands national football team from 1926 to 1928.
