= Wim van der Gaag =

Dutch-Australian footballer (born 1936)

Personal information
- Date of birth: 14 July 1936 (age 90)
- Place of birth: Rotterdam, Netherlands
- Position: Forward

Youth career
- RFC Rotterdam

Senior career*
Years	Team	Apps	(Gls)
1954	BVC Rotterdam		
1954–1955	Vitesse		(2)
1955–1956	Emma		(7)
1957–1959	BVV	44	(25)
1957–1958	→ Xerxes (loan)	1	(0)
1960	Sydney Austral		
- Sydney FC Prague
1961	AGOVV	10	(3)
1961–1962	Safeway United		
1963	Pan Hellenic Sydney		
1963	South Coast United		
1964	Ringwood Wilhelmina		
1966–1967	AGOVV	5	(4)
1967–1968	PEC Zwolle	5	(0)

Managerial career
- CDN Driebergen
- Amsvoorde Amersfoort
- Lunteren
- WVC Winterswijk
- 1987: AD Aalten
- Steenderen
- SDOUC Ulft
- * Club domestic league appearances and goals

Wim van der Gaag (born 14 July 1936) is a Dutch former professional footballer who played as a forward in the Netherlands and Australia. Later, he became a manager of amateur clubs and a football reporter for various radio stations.

== Playing career ==
Born in Rotterdam, Wim van der Gaag played in his youth in the now-defunct RFC Rotterdam.

In 1954 he turned professional in the short-lived NBVB league, scoring the second goal of BVC Rotterdam on 7 November 1954, in a game that ended in a 3–2 loss against BVC Den Haag. In 1954–55 Van der Gaag played for SBV Vitesse, scoring two goals that season. In 1955–56, at SC Emma, he was the top scorer with Janus van der Gijp, both scoring seven goals. In 1957–58, Van der Gaag played at BVV in the Eredivisie. Late August 1959, Van der Gaag scored the first two goals in BVV's 4–0 victory over Excelsior.

He continued to the Australian sides Sydney Austral, Sydney FC Prague, Pan Hellenic Sydney, South Coast United (1961–62), and Ringwood Wilhelmina.

Back in the Netherlands, at AGOVV Apeldoorn (1966–67), Van der Gaag was instrumental in its 2–0 victory against Excelsior Rotterdam on 14 August 1966, this time scoring only one of two goals. At PEC Zwolle (1967–68), he scored both goals in its 2–1 national cup victory against Zwolsche Boys on 31 December 1967. The victory was especially sweet as it was against PEC's urban rival.

== Managerial career ==
Van der Gaag managed CDN Driebergen, Amsvoorde Amersfoort, VV Lunteren, WVC Winterswijk, AD Aalten, SV Steenderen and SDOUC Ulft.

== Personal life ==
Wim is the father of football player and manager Mitchell van der Gaag (born 1971) and the grandfather of footballers Jordan van der Gaag (1999) and Luca van der Gaag (2001).
