= Jordan van der Gaag =

Dutch footballer (born 1999)

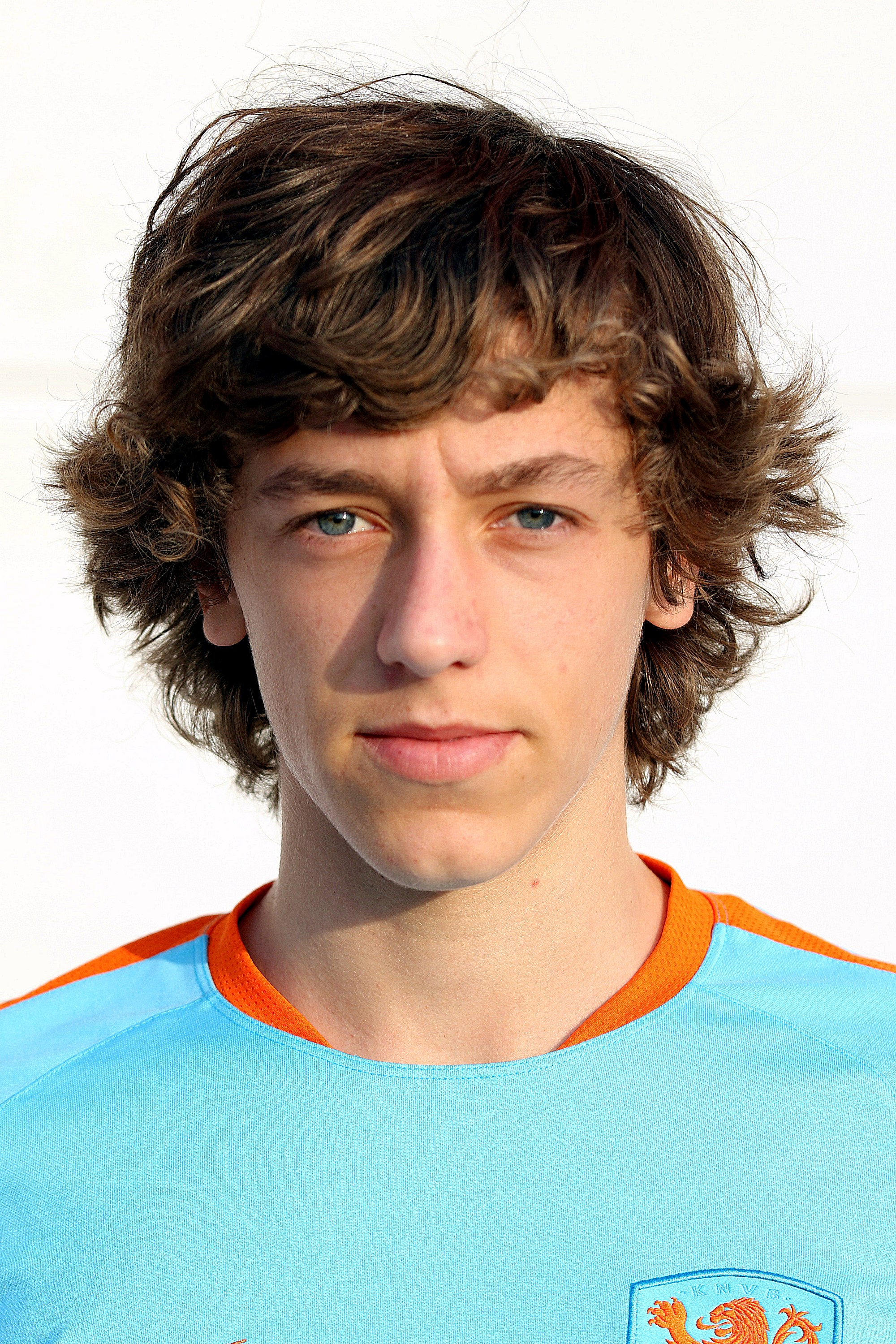
- Van der Gaag with Netherlands U18 in 2017

Personal information
- Date of birth: 3 January 1999 (age 27)
- Place of birth: The Hague, Netherlands
- Height: 1.77 m (5 ft 10 in)
- Positions: Winger; midfielder

Team information
- Current team: Leiria
- Number: 10

Youth career
- 2009–2010: Marítimo
- 2011–2017: Benfica
- 2016–2017: → Estoril (loan)
- 2017–2018: NAC

Senior career*
Years	Team	Apps	(Gls)
2018–2020	NAC	17	(2)
2018–2019	→ Helmond Sport (loan)	28	(1)
2020–2022	B-SAD (Note: Belenenses SAD changed its name to B-SAD in 2021.)	6	(0)
2020–2022	→ B-SAD B	4	(0)
2022–	Leiria	93	(5)

International career
2014	Netherlands U15	1	(0)
2016	Netherlands U17	1	(0)
2017	Netherlands U18	2	(0)
2017	Netherlands U19	1	(0)
- * Club domestic league appearances and goals as of 26 May 2026

Jordan van der Gaag (born 3 January 1999) is a Dutch professional footballer who plays as a winger or midfielder for Liga Portugal 2 club Leiria.

== Club career ==
Born in The Hague, van der Gaag began as a youth at Portuguese club Marítimo, where his father was managing. He had several years at Benfica and a loan to Estoril before signing a three-year deal at NAC Breda in 2017.

He made his Eredivisie debut for NAC Breda under his father's management on 12 August 2018 in a game against AZ Alkmaar, coming on as a 70th-minute substitute for Mitchell te Vrede in a 5–0 away loss.

In August 2018, he moved on loan for a season to Eerste Divisie side Helmond Sport. He scored his first professional goal, his only one for the club, to open a 2–1 loss at FC Eindhoven on 23 November.

Van der Gaag moved back to Portugal in October 2020, joining his younger brother in the ranks of B-SAD. After a handful of appearances for the reserve team in the Campeonato de Portugal, he made his first-team debut on 14 January 2021 in the fifth round of the Taça de Portugal, as a 65th-minute substitute for Thibang Phete in a 3–2 extra-time win at Fafe. On 4 April he made his Primeira Liga bow as a replacement for Sphephelo Sithole in the last nine minutes of a 2–0 home loss to Boavista.

On 23 January 2022, Van der Gaag came on as a first-half substitute for Nilton Varela away to his former team Marítimo, and was sent off 32 minutes later in a 1–1 draw.

Van der Gaag signed for Liga 3 team Leiria on 8 July 2022.

== International career ==
From 2014 to 2017, Van der Gaag earned five caps for the Netherlands from under-15 to under-19 level. His sole appearance for the last of those teams was on 1 September 2017, starting in a 2–2 friendly draw with Portugal in Vaasa, Finland; he was substituted for Donyell Malen after 61 minutes.

== Personal life ==
Van der Gaag is the son of the former professional footballer and current manager, Mitchell van der Gaag, who played for Marítimo and managed that club and Belenenses, among others. His younger brother, Luca, was a teammate at B-SAD. His paternal grandfather, Wim, was one of the first Dutch professional footballers in 1954.
