= DHC Delft =

Dutch football club

DHC
- Full name: Delfia-Hollandia Combinatie
- Founded: 17 March 1910
- Ground: Brasserkade, Delft
- League: Vierde Klasse Saturday A (2025–26)
- Website: http://www.dhc-delft.nl/
Home colours

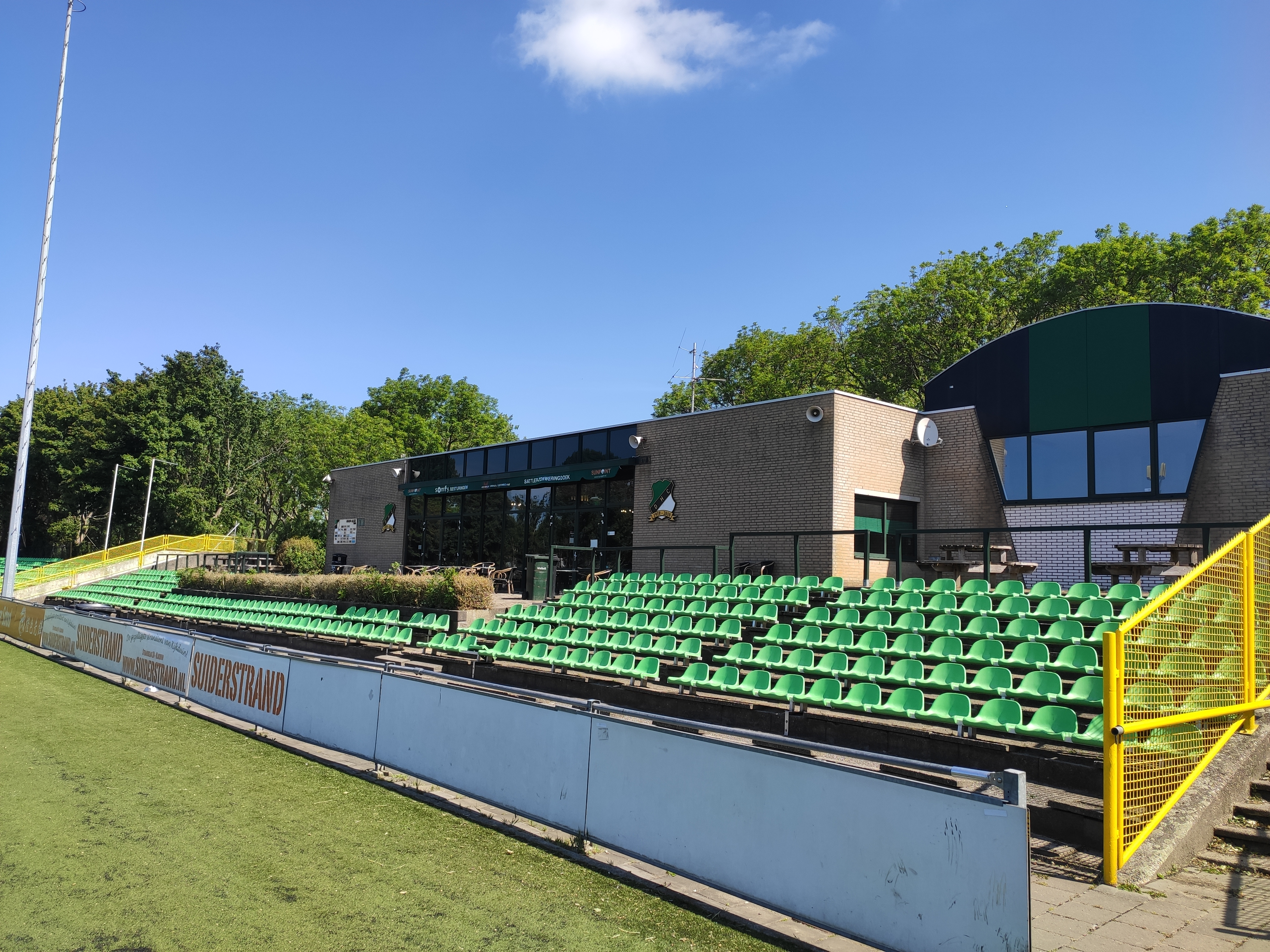
DHC Delft clubhouse

Delfia Hollandia Combinatie, commonly known as DHC, is a football club from Delft, Netherlands. DHC is currently playing in the Vierde Klasse Saturday A.

== History ==
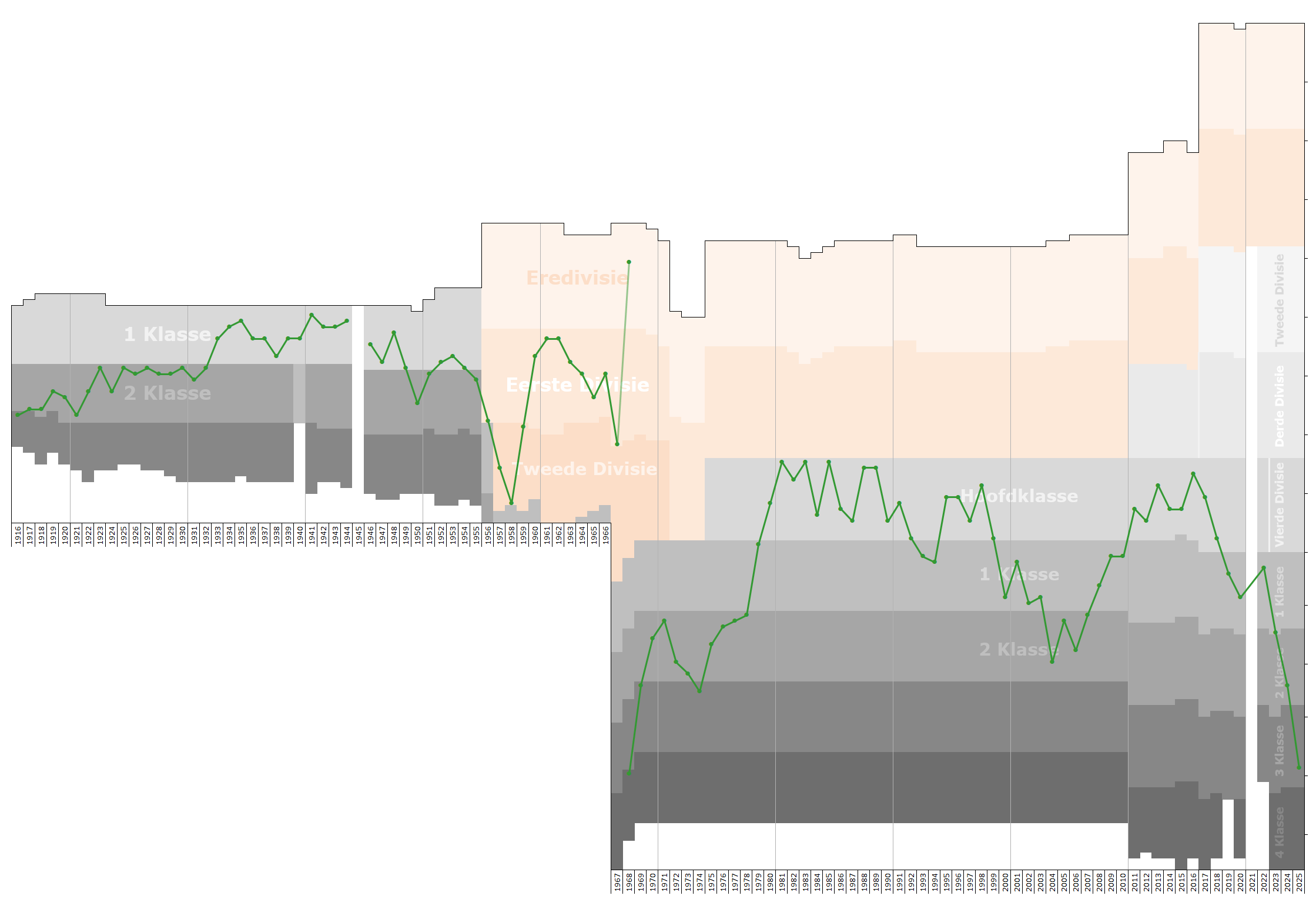
Historical chart of league performance

DHC played professional football from 1955 to 1968. The club played its first year in the Eerste Klasse, which was later changed to Eerste Divisie. DHC finished bottom of the league in their first season of professional football and were relegated to the newly established Tweede Divisie. Three seasons later, DHC finished second in the Tweede Divisie and was promoted to the 1959–60 Eerste Divisie. DHC finished at second place twice in the Eerste Divisie.

In 1967, DHC finished at last place in the Eerste Divisie. Due to some financial problems, the club was forced to merge with the pro-section of Xerxes. Xerxes was playing in the Eredivisie, so one season later, Xerxes/DHC'66 also played in the Eredivisie. The club however played its matches on the Xerxes ground in Rotterdam instead of playing in Delft. Xerxes/DHC'66 finished at 7th place, but was disbanded due to ongoing financial problems.

Because of the merger with Xerxes, DHC started a new amateur section in 1966, which started to play in the Vierde Klasse (the seventh tier in Dutch football at the time). A little over a decade later, DHC played in the highest leagues of amateur football again. DHC won the 1979 KNVB District Cup for Sunday amateur clubs in the West 2 District. In 1983 and 1985, DHC became national champions of Sunday amateur football.

== Historical list of coaches ==
- (England) Gus Smith (1922–)
- (England) Tim Coleman (1931–1934)
- (England) Sam Wadsworth (1934–1935)
- (England) Bert Bellamy (1937–1938)
- (England) Gus Smith (–1940)
- (Netherlands) Joop van Nellen (1940–1941)
- (Scotland) Peter Dougall (1948–)
- (Netherlands) Coen Delsen (–1954)
- (Netherlands) Eef Ruisch (1954–1956)
- (Netherlands) Jan van Buijtenen (1958–1960)
- (Austria) Friedrich Donenfeld (1961–1962)
- (Netherlands) Liest van der Geest (1962–1963)
- (Netherlands) Rinus Loof (1963–1965)
- (Netherlands) Liest van der Geest (1965–1967)
- (Netherlands) Guus Haak (1973–1990)
- (Netherlands) Rob de Lange (2008–2021)
