= List of Netherlands international footballers =

This is the list of players that have played for the Netherlands national football team, ever since the first match against Belgium on April 30, 1905. It includes all players with correct statistitics up until the match of 30 June 2026 against Morocco. The players are listed in chronological order according to the date of their debut. Additionally, their dates of birth, number of caps and goals are stated.

== 1905–1909 ==
number	date of debut	name	date of birth	number of caps	number of goals	date of death†
1	30-04-1905	Reinier Beeuwkes	17-02-1884	19	0	01-04-1963
2	30-04-1905	Rein Boomsma	19-06-1879	2	0	26-05-1943
3	30-04-1905	Karel Gleenewinkel Kamperdijk	30-10-1883	2	0	20-06-1975
4	30-04-1905	Dolf Kessler	02-04-1884	3	0	21-08-1945
5	30-04-1905	Bok de Korver	27-01-1883	31	1	22-10-1957
6	30-04-1905	Dirk Lotsy	03-07-1882	10	1	27-03-1965
7	30-04-1905	Guus Lutjens	13-08-1884	14	5	25-04-1974
8	30-04-1905	Eddy de Neve	01-01-1882	3	6	30-08-1943
9	30-04-1905	Peet Stol	26-01-1880	2	0	27-11-1956
10	30-04-1905	Ben Stom	13-10-1886	9	0	18-08-1965
11	30-04-1905	Willy de Vos	26-01-1880	2	0	15-07-1957
12	14-05-1905	Willem Hesselink	08-02-1878	1	1	01-12-1973
13	29-04-1906	Kees Bekker	26-10-1883	6	0	28-12-1964
14	29-04-1906	Frans de Bruyn Kops	28-10-1886	3	0	22-11-1979
15	29-04-1906	Constant Feith	03-08-1884	8	2	15-09-1958
16	29-04-1906	Mannes Francken	20-05-1888	22	17	19-11-1948
17	29-04-1906	Anton Lens	28-11-1884	2	0	08-10-1955
18	29-04-1906	Henk Muller	24-10-1887	2	1	07-05-1940
19	29-04-1906	Jan Schoemaker	29-05-1882	2	0	27-05-1954
20	13-05-1906	Jo Eshuijs	06-02-1885	1	0	24-11-1979
21	13-05-1906	Toine van Renterghem	17-04-1885	3	0	01-03-1967
22	13-05-1906	Ferry van der Vinne	19-07-1886	3	1	15-11-1947
23	01-04-1907	Jan van Beek	22-10-1880	1	0	02-09-1954
24	01-04-1907	Hans Blume	16-11-1887	1	1	January 1978
25	01-04-1907	Pieter Boelmans ter Spill	26-01-1886	3	0	31-10-1954
26	01-04-1907	Iman Dozy	10-05-1887	4	0	18-07-1957
27	01-04-1907	John Heijning	12-12-1884	8	0	19-05-1947
28	01-04-1907	Karel Heijting	01-05-1883	17	0	00-08-1951
29	01-04-1907	Max Henny	01-10-1885	1	0	05-01-1968
30	01-04-1907	Willem Janssen	11-06-1880	3	0	08-09-1976
31	14-04-1907	Lothar van Gogh	07-02-1888	2	2	28-05-1945
32	21-12-1907	Lo la Chapelle	22-06-1888	1	0	23-07-1966
33	21-12-1907	Tonny Kessler	20-04-1889	3	1	15-02-1960
34	21-12-1907	Lou Otten	05-11-1883	12	0	07-11-1946
35	21-12-1907	Cas Ruffelse	09-02-1888	8	3	09-09-1958
36	21-12-1907	Edu Snethlage	09-05-1886	11	10	12-01-1941
37	21-12-1907	Jan Thomée	04-12-1886	16	16	01-04-1954
38	21-12-1907	Caius Welcker	09-07-1885	17	5	13-02-1939
39	29-03-1908	Herman Jurgens	18-07-1884	2	0	07-09-1964
40	29-03-1908	Noud Stempels	04-04-1882	3	0	12-10-1970
41	26-04-1908	Jan Akkersdijk	08-01-1887	2	1	31-03-1953
42	10-05-1908	Guus van Hecking Colenbrander	07-11-1887	1	0	13-03-1945
43	22-10-1908	Miel Mundt	30-05-1880	4	0	17-06-1949
44	22-10-1908	Jops Reeman	09-08-1886	2	1	16-03-1959
45	22-10-1908	Ed Sol	10-06-1881	3	0	21-10-1965
46	23-10-1908	Jan Kok	09-07-1889	1	0	02-12-1958
47	25-10-1908	Wim Groskamp	08-10-1886	1	0	13-01-1974
48	25-10-1908	Harry Kuneman	15-01-1886	1	0	07-09-1945
49	21-03-1909	Vic Gonsalves	20-10-1887	3	0	29-08-1922
50	21-03-1909	Dé Kessler	11-08-1891	21	9	06-09-1943
51	21-03-1909	Kees van Nieuwenhuizen	21-04-1884	2	0	12-10-1981
52	25-04-1909	Willem Boerdam	02-11-1883	2	0	09-12-1966
53	11-12-1909	Leo Bosschart	24-08-1888	19	1	09-05-1951
54	11-12-1909	Herman Peltzer	07-09-1887	1	0	24-06-1957

== 1910–1919 ==
number	date of debut	name	date of birth	number of caps	number of goals	date of death†
55	13-03-1910	Piet van der Wolk	18-03-1892	6	0	23-11-1952
56	10-04-1910	Arnold Hörburger	17-02-1886	8	0	20-02-1966
57	16-10-1910	Miel van Leijden	20-12-1885	1	0	04-06-1949
58	16-10-1910	Nico de Wolf	27-10-1887	5	0	18-07-1967
59	16-10-1910	Philip van Dijk	09-08-1885	1	0	10-04-1937
60	16-10-1910	Nol van Berckel	22-12-1890	6	2	08-09-1973
61	19-03-1911	Just Göbel	21-11-1891	22	0	05-05-1984
62	19-03-1911	Gé Fortgens	10-07-1887	8	0	04-05-1957
63	02-04-1911	Guus de Seriere	05-03-1893	2	0	30-12-1980
64	02-04-1911	Jan van Breda Kolff	18-01-1894	11	1	06-02-1976
65	10-03-1912	Wim Bronger	18-01-1888	1	0	25-02-1965
66	10-03-1912	Piet Valkenburg	08-11-1888	1	0	10-09-1950
67	10-03-1912	Huug de Groot	07-05-1890	9	6	18-04-1957
68	16-03-1912	Jan Vos	17-04-1888	15	10	25-08-1939
69	16-03-1912	Nico Bouvy	11-07-1892	9	4	14-06-1957
70	28-04-1912	Gerrit Bouwmeester	11-08-1892	1	0	01-02-1961
71	29-06-1912	David Wijnveldt	15-12-1891	13	0	28-03-1962
72	29-06-1912	Cees ten Cate	20-08-1890	3	1	09-06-1972
73	30-06-1912	Piet Bouman	14-10-1892	9	0	20-07-1980
74	30-06-1912	Joop Boutmy	29-04-1894	10	1	26-07-1972
75	04-07-1912	Jan van der Sluis	29-04-1889	1	2	19-10-1952
76	17-11-1912	Jur Haak	03-11-1890	2	2	30-01-1945
77	24-03-1913	Willy Westra van Holthe	09-03-1888	4	1	18-05-1965
78	20-04-1913	Arie Bijvoet	27-02-1891	1	0	12-11-1976
79	15-11-1913	Wout Buitenweg	24-12-1893	11	14	10-11-1976
80	15-03-1914	Jan Noorduijn	30-08-1889	4	0	16-02-1957
81	15-03-1914	Jacques Francken	17-09-1891	1	1	25-04-1961
82	05-04-1914	Nico Buwalda	25-06-1890	2	0	13-06-1970
83	17-05-1914	Barend van Hemert	10-05-1891	1	0	January 1945
84	17-05-1914	Dolf van der Nagel	28-05-1889	1	0	10-10-1949
85	09-06-1919	Harry Dénis	28-08-1896	56	0	13-07-1971
86	09-06-1919	Ben Verweij	31-08-1895	11	0	16-07-1951
87	09-06-1919	Henk Hordijk	19-09-1893	9	0	19-12-1975
88	09-06-1919	Piet Tekelenburg	06-11-1894	2	0	01-04-1945
89	09-06-1919	Boelie Kessler	30-11-1896	9	2	17-08-1971
90	09-06-1919	Theo Brokmann	19-09-1893	1	1	28-08-1956
91	09-06-1919	Wim Gupffert	18-10-1894	3	2	27-12-1958
92	24-08-1919	Evert van Linge	19-11-1895	13	3	06-12-1964
93	24-08-1919	Henk Steeman	15-01-1894	13	0	16-02-1979
94	24-08-1919	Georg Beijers	03-12-1895	1	0	03-06-1978
95	31-08-1919	Martien Houtkooper	27-10-1891	1	0	16-04-1961
96	31-08-1919	Ber Felix	08-04-1895	1	0	28-07-1967

== 1920–1929 ==
number	date of debut	name	date of birth	number of caps	number of goals	date of death†
97	05-04-1920	Dick MacNeill	17-01-1898	7	0	03-06-1963
98	05-04-1920	Eduard van Roessel	07-09-1897	2	0	26-01-1976
99	05-04-1920	Jan de Natris	13-11-1895	23	5	16-11-1972
100	05-04-1920	Joop van Dort	25-05-1889	5	0	01-04-1967
101	05-04-1920	Herman van Diermen	26-09-1895	5	0	14-10-1946
102	05-04-1920	Tinus van Beurden	30-04-1893	1	0	29-05-1950
103	16-05-1920	Harry Mommers	11-03-1892	1	0	28-02-1963
104	16-05-1920	Antoon "Rat" Verlegh	29-03-1896	8	2	12-03-1960
105	28-08-1920	Frits Kuipers	11-07-1899	5	0	10-10-1943
106	28-08-1920	Oscar van Rappard	02-04-1896	4	0	18-04-1962
107	28-08-1920	Ber Groosjohan	16-06-1897	14	5	05-08-1971
108	28-08-1920	Jaap Bulder	27-09-1896	6	6	30-04-1979
109	29-08-1920	Arie Bieshaar	15-03-1899	4	0	21-01-1965
110	05-09-1920	Felix von Heyden	11-04-1890	1	0	17-11-1982
111	05-09-1920	Evert Jan Bulder	24-12-1894	1	0	21-04-1973
112	26-03-1921	Henk van Tilburg	02-12-1898	9	0	14-07-1985
113	26-03-1921	Henri Baaij	19-09-1900	2	0	31-05-1943
114	26-03-1921	Piet Stevens	13-12-1897	5	0	26-10-1970
115	26-03-1921	Joop Campioni	04-08-1901	2	0	04-01-1962
116	26-03-1921	Ben Hoogstede	16-03-1888	4	0	22-07-1962
117	26-03-1921	Andre de Kruijff	09-04-1895	1	0	29-11-1964
118	26-03-1921	Hein Delsen	13-01-1895	3	0	13-11-1954
119	08-05-1921	David Buitenweg	29-10-1898	1	0	09-04-1968
120	08-05-1921	Jan van Gendt	16-03-1897	5	5	15-08-1971
121	15-05-1921	Fons Pelser	28-12-1893	6	0	02-07-1974
122	12-06-1921	Eb van der Kluft	23-05-1889	4	0	05-07-1970
123	12-06-1921	Siebold Sissingh	05-07-1899	1	0	31-05-1960
124	12-06-1921	Gerrit Hulsman	18-02-1900	4	0	23-11-1964
125	12-06-1921	Max Tetzner	25-09-1896	3	0	07-11-1962
126	12-06-1921	Harry Rodermond	03-01-1897	5	3	29-03-1983
127	12-06-1921	Chris Walder	08-05-1900	1	0	06-12-1997
128	13-11-1921	Herman Legger	07-07-1895	2	0	07-09-1978
129	26-03-1922	Feike Lietzen	07-10-1893	1	0	28-05-1970
130	17-04-1922	Appie Groen	07-09-1901	5	1	29-02-1964
131	07-05-1922	Jaap Grobbe	24-03-1897	1	0	05-03-1983
132	19-11-1922	André le Fèvre	12-12-1898	17	1	06-11-1977
133	19-11-1922	Joost Schot	22-01-1894	1	0	19-07-1923
134	19-11-1922	Sjo Soons	28-08-1898	1	0	15-09-1964
135	19-11-1922	Frans Petit	15-11-1898	1	0	20-02-1971
136	02-04-1923	Fred van der Poel	05-02-1902	1	0	23-01-1980
137	02-04-1923	Wim Roetert	22-01-1892	1	2	29-04-1969
138	02-04-1923	Wim Addicks	28-08-1896	3	2	08-07-1985
139	02-04-1923	Dick Sigmond	22-05-1897	14	1	22-02-1950
140	29-04-1923	Jan de Boer	29-08-1898	5	0	30-06-1988
141	29-04-1923	Jan Jole	21-12-1890	2	0	03-02-1953
142	29-04-1923	Dolf Heijnen	25-10-1894	2	1	11-12-1966
143	25-10-1923	Hans Tetzner	09-06-1898	8	0	17-02-1987
144	25-10-1923	Bertus Bul	16-05-1897	6	0	04-10-1972
145	25-10-1923	Peer Krom	10-03-1898	14	1	15-12-1965
146	25-10-1923	Jos van Son	31-05-1893	1	0	14-07-1956
147	25-10-1923	Theo 'Rieks' de Haas	02-09-1902	4	1	06-01-1976
148	23-03-1924	Gerrit Visser	02-02-1903	7	1	12-1984
149	23-03-1924	Kees Pijl	09-06-1897	8	7	03-09-1976
150	21-04-1924	Adriaan Koonings	23-12-1895	1	0	18-04-1963
151	27-04-1924	Gejus van der Meulen	23-01-1903	54	0	10-07-1972
152	27-04-1924	Albert Snouck Hurgronje	30-05-1903	6	1	28-06-1967
153	02-06-1924	Ok Formenoy	16-03-1899	4	4	14-02-1977
154	02-06-1924	Joop ter Beek	01-06-1901	1	0	05-09-1934
155	06-06-1924	Gerrit Horsten	16-04-1900	6	0	23-07-1961
156	08-06-1924	Jan Oosthoek	05-03-1898	2	0	08-03-1973
157	08-06-1924	Henk Vermetten	19-08-1895	6	0	07-08-1964
158	08-06-1924	Klaas Breeuwer	25-11-1901	1	0	24-04-1961
159	02-11-1924	Wim Volkers	03-10-1899	7	2	04-01-1990
160	02-11-1924	Charles van Baar van Slangenburgh	31-03-1902	6	5	17-07-1978
161	15-03-1925	Kees van Dijke	18-12-1902	3	0	03-05-1983
162	29-03-1925	Jan Gielens	17-08-1903	9	1	26-07-1964
163	19-04-1925	Puck van Heel	21-01-1904	64	0	18-12-1984
164	19-04-1925	Jan Schindeler	18-12-1892	1	0	07-12-1963
165	03-05-1925	Wiggert van Daalen	22-02-1895	1	0	27-11-1968
166	03-05-1925	Terus Küchlin	13-09-1906	3	1	20-10-1981
167	25-10-1925	Dolf van Kol	02-08-1902	33	4	20-01-1989
168	25-10-1925	Henk Wamsteker	01-05-1900	2	0	12-07-1959
169	25-10-1925	Wim Tap	03-10-1903	33	17	24-09-1979
170	14-03-1926	Tonny van Haeren	23-09-1899	1	0	21-06-1976
171	14-03-1926	Kees Oldenburg	28-12-1900	1	0	20-01-1954
172	28-03-1926	Eef Ruisch	26-07-1906	7	2	24-10-1976
173	18-04-1926	Kees Quax	14-07-1905	3	0	18-03-1973
174	18-04-1926	Marius Sandberg	05-09-1896	2	0	19-03-1986
175	18-04-1926	Jan Hassink	06-04-1902	2	0	26-07-1927
176	13-06-1926	Cor van Nus	29-05-1905	1	0	09-08-1980
177	13-06-1926	Wim Anderiesen	27-11-1903	46	0	18-07-1944
178	31-10-1926	Pierre Massy	03-02-1900	12	3	03-08-1958
179	31-10-1926	Jan Elfring	08-02-1902	15	2	04-09-1977
180	31-10-1926	Rens Vis	04-11-1904	1	0	08-03-1903
181	31-10-1926	Koos van Gelder	19-10-1908	5	1	26-03-1984
182	13-03-1927	Dolf Scheeffer	29-11-1907	1	0	26-10-1966
183	18-04-1927	Theo Schetters	21-04-1896	1	0	07-12-1973
184	18-04-1927	Felix Smeets	29-04-1904	14	7	14-03-1961
185	18-04-1927	Leo Ghering	19-08-1900	9	6	01-04-1966
186	18-04-1927	Jaap Weber	04-08-1901	14	1	30-09-1979
187	12-06-1927	Jan van den Broek	08-06-1907	11	4	07-11-1964
188	12-06-1927	Kees van der Zalm	30-09-1901	3	0	25-12-1957
189	13-11-1927	Piet van Boxtel	06-10-1902	7	0	27-08-1991
190	11-03-1928	Jaap van de Griend	24-01-1904	5	0	27-11-1970
191	01-04-1928	Frits Schipper	24-12-1904	1	0	23-01-1989
192	01-04-1928	Jo Kluin	13-05-1904	1	0	14-04-1977
193	22-04-1928	Harry Schreurs	11-12-1901	2	0	16-10-1973
194	22-04-1928	Cor Kools	20-07-1907	16	3	24-09-1985
195	30-05-1928	Bertus Freese	20-02-1902	1	0	21-11-1959
196	14-06-1928	Maarten Grobbe	07-09-1901	2	1	13-05-1961
197	14-06-1928	Gerrit Nagels	07-04-1906	3	0	26-02-1950
198	04-11-1928	Wim van Dolder	11-04-1903	3	0	13-02-1969
199	02-12-1928	Leo Halle	26-01-1906	15	0	15-06-1992
200	02-12-1928	Gerard Tap	27-01-1900	1	0	01-01-1980
201	02-12-1928	Bep Bakhuys	16-04-1909	23	28	07-07-1982
202	02-12-1928	Joop van Nellen	15-03-1910	27	7	14-11-1992
203	17-03-1929	Willy van Zwieteren	15-01-1904	1	0	26-11-1983
204	17-03-1929	Jan Halle	17-02-1903	2	0	06-01-1986
205	17-03-1929	Adje Gerritse	04-06-1908	1	0	27-01-1995
206	17-03-1929	Jaap Barendregt	10-01-1905	1	0	16-02-1952
207	05-05-1929	Hans van Kesteren	21-02-1908	1	0	21-07-1998
208	05-05-1929	Gep Landaal	02-12-1899	8	2	01-07-1975
209	09-06-1929	Sjaak de Bruin	18-02-1903	3	0	26-01-1969
210	09-06-1929	Koos van der Wildt	23-11-1905	7	0	25-01-1985
211	09-06-1929	Frans Hombörg	11-06-1898	2	0	17-12-1943
212	12-06-1929	Huub de Leeuw	15-04-1910	2	0	30-06-1983
213	03-11-1929	Herman van Loon	19-01-1910	1	0	04-12-1981
214	03-11-1929	Evert van der Heijden	15-10-1900	8	1	27-12-1959

== 1930–1939 ==
date of debut	name	number of caps	number of goals
06-04-1930	Henk Breitner	5	0
06-04-1930	Jan de Kreek	3	0
08-06-1930	Piet van Reenen	2	0
02-11-1930	Law Adam	11	6
02-11-1930	Wim Groenendijk	1	0
02-11-1930	Wim Lagendaal	15	14
02-11-1930	Henk Mulders	2	1
29-03-1931	Jaap Paauwe	8	0
29-03-1931	Sjef van Run	25	0
14-06-1931	Mauk Weber	27	0
14-06-1931	Frank Wels	36	5
29-11-1931	Jaap Mol	5	1
20-03-1932	Adri van Male	15	0
08-05-1932	Bas Paauwe	31	1
29-05-1932	Otto Bonsema	6	3
04-12-1932	Henk Pellikaan	13	0
07-05-1933	Toon Duijnhouwer	1	0
10-12-1933	Jan van Diepenbeek	4	0
10-12-1933	Arend Schoemaker	1	0
10-12-1933	Leen Vente	21	19
11-03-1934	Kees Mijnders	7	0
11-03-1934	Kick Smit	29	26
29-04-1934	Gerrit Keizer	2	0
10-05-1934	Toon Oprinsen	1	0
17-02-1934	Daaf Drok	8	4
31-03-1935	Bertus Caldenhove	25	0
29-03-1936	Evert Mul	1	0
01-11-1936	Charles de Bock	1	1
31-01-1937	Lulof Heetjans	1	0
31-01-1937	Henk van Spaandonck	8	4
31-01-1937	Cor Wilders	8	0
07-03-1937	Jo van den Hoven	1	0
07-03-1937	Manus Vrauwdeunt	1	1
04-04-1937	Charles Lungen	1	0
31-10-1937	Ko Bergman	8	5
28-11-1937	Piet de Boer	1	3
28-11-1937	Gerard Kuppen	3	0
28-11-1937	Piet Punt	1	0
21-05-1938	Bertus de Harder	12	3
21-05-1938	Frans van der Veen	8	1
23-10-1938	Piet Dumortier	1	0
23-10-1938	Gerard van Leur	1	1
23-10-1938	Arie de Vroet	22	0
26-02-1939	Henk Blomvliet	2	0
26-02-1939	Guus Dräger	13	5
26-02-1939	Jan Schubert	2	0
26-02-1939	Bob Stam	4	0
23-04-1939	Hennie Dijkstra	2	0

== 1940–1949 ==
date of debut	name	number of caps	number of goals
17-03-1940	Niek Michel	1	0
17-03-1940	Ko Stijger	2	0
31-03-1940	Herman Choufour	1	0
31-03-1940	Abe Lenstra	47	33
31-03-1940	Jan Poulus	1	0
31-03-1940	Kees Slot	1	0
31-03-1940	Heinz Vroomen	1	0
21-04-1940	Herman van den Engel	1	1
21-04-1940	Joop van der Heide	1	0
21-04-1940	Ab de Vries	1	0
21-04-1940	Joop Wille	1	0
10-03-1946	Henk van Buijtenen	1	0
10-03-1946	Jan Holleman	3	0
10-03-1946	Piet Kraak	33	0
10-03-1946	Henk van der Linden	7	0
10-03-1946	Kees Rijvers	33	10
10-03-1946	Faas Wilkes	38	35
12-05-1946	Jan Potharst	6	0
12-05-1946	Wim Roosen	6	1
27-11-1946	Arie Vermeer	1	0
07-04-1947	Jeu van Bun	11	0
07-04-1947	Wim Lakenberg	1	0
07-04-1947	Hennie Möring	6	0
07-04-1947	Gerrie Stroker	3	0
04-05-1947	Henk Schijvenaar	18	0
21-09-1947	Gé van Dijk	2	0
21-09-1947	Joop Stoffelen	12	0
14-03-1948	Piet Spel	1	0
18-04-1948	Han Engelsman	1	1
18-04-1948	Rinus Schaap	13	1
18-04-1948	Rinus Terlouw	34	0
26-05-1948	Mick Clavan	27	7
26-05-1948	Andre Roosenburg	9	1
26-05-1948	Cock van der Tuyn	11	2
26-07-1948	Kees Krijgh sr	3	0
31-07-1948	Bram Appel	12	10
21-11-1948	Herman van Raalte	1	0
13-03-1949	Joek Brandes	3	1
13-03-1949	Jan van Schijndel	17	1
13-03-1949	Frans Steenbergen	2	0
23-04-1949	Frans de Munck	31	0
23-04-1949	Piet van Overbeek	1	0
23-04-1949	Theo Timmermans	12	4
16-06-1949	Jan Everse sr	3	0
16-06-1949	Jan van Roessel	6	5
16-06-1949	Dre Saris	1	0
11-12-1949	Piet van der Sluis	3	0

== 1950–1959 ==
date of debut	name	number of caps	number of goals
16-04-1950	Cor van der Hoeven	3	0
16-04-1950	Jan Schrumpf	1	0
16-04-1950	Piet Steenbergen	2	0
08-06-1950	Germ Hofma	2	0
08-06-1950	Cor Huibregts	3	0
08-06-1950	Rinus Michels	5	0
15-10-1950	Frits de Graaf	3	2
15-10-1950	Frans van der Klink	1	0
15-10-1950	Noud van Melis	13	15
15-10-1950	Ferry Mesman	1	0
12-11-1950	Aad de Jong	5	0
12-11-1950	Sjef Mertens	1	0
12-11-1950	Dick Snoek	3	0
10-12-1950	Louis Biesbrouck	19	0
15-04-1951	Piet Groeneveld	3	0
15-04-1951	Jampie Kuneman	2	0
27-10-1951	Piet Bakers	1	0
27-10-1951	Joop Odenthal	13	0
27-10-1951	Bram Wiertz	8	0
25-11-1951	Rinus Bennaars	15	2
25-11-1951	Louis van den Bogert	3	0
06-04-1952	Sjaak Alberts	5	0
06-04-1952	Piet van der Kuil	40	9
14-05-1952	Wim Hendriks	3	0
16-06-1952	Jo Mommers	1	0
21-09-1952	Hans Boskamp	4	0
19-10-1952	Klaas Lugthart	2	0
19-10-1952	Frans Tebak	10	0
15-11-1952	Wim Landman	7	0
15-11-1952	Frits Louer	3	1
07-03-1953	Jan Klaassens	57	1
07-03-1953	Cor Luiten	4	0
19-04-1953	Max van Beurden	5	1
19-04-1953	Wim Bleijenberg	3	0
19-04-1953	Tonny van Ede	2	0
27-09-1953	Hans van der Hoek	2	0
27-09-1953	Heimen Lagerwaard	1	0
27-09-1953	Pauke Meijers	1	0
27-09-1953	Lieuwe Steiger	7	0
25-10-1953	Gerard Gruisen	3	0
25-10-1953	Louis Overbeeke	3	0
07-03-1954	Cor van der Gijp	13	6
30-05-1954	Coen Dillen	5	4
30-05-1954	Wim van der Gijp	1	0
24-10-1954	Sjel de Bruijckere	7	2
24-10-1954	Roel Wiersma	53	0
13-03-1955	Cor van der Hart	44	2
13-03-1955	Kees Kuijs	43	0
01-05-1955	Piet Geel	1	0
01-05-1955	Henk Schouten	2	0
16-10-1955	Tinus Bosselaar	17	4
16-10-1955	Jan Brooijmans	2	0
06-11-1955	Toon Brusselers	4	2
06-11-1955	Bart Carlier	5	2
14-03-1956	Coy Koopal	6	2
14-03-1956	Jan Notermans	25	2
08-04-1956	Coen Moulijn	38	4
06-06-1956	Aad Bak	1	0
15-09-1956	Gerrit Voges	2	0
30-01-1957	Henk Angenent	1	0
30-01-1957	Tonny van der Linden	24	17
28-04-1957	Eddy Pieters Graafland	47	0
28-04-1957	Fons van Wissen	30	4
17-11-1957	Hans Kraay	8	0
17-11-1957	Piet Kruiver	22	12
04-05-1958	Carol Schuurman	4	0
10-05-1959	Leo Canjels	3	2
13-05-1959	Harry Brüll	2	0
13-05-1959	Piet de Vries	1	0
21-10-1959	Frans Bouwmeester	5	0
04-11-1959	Jan Renders	5	0

== 1960–1969 ==
date of debut	name	number of caps	number of goals
03-04-1960	Henk Groot	39	12
03-04-1960	Humphrey Mijnals	3	0
03-04-1960	Bennie Muller	43	2
18-05-1960	Gerard Kerkum	1	0
26-06-1960	Pierre Kerkhoffs	5	0
26-06-1960	Sjaak Swart	31	10
30-10-1960	Co Prins	10	3
30-04-1961	Gerard 'Pummy' Bergholtz	12	0
14-05-1961	Tonny Pronk	19	0
14-05-1961	Cor Veldhoen	27	0
22-10-1961	Reinier Kreijermaat	2	0
01-04-1962	Piet Lagarde	2	0
01-04-1962	Peet Petersen	4	1
09-05-1962	Peter van de Merwe	5	0
05-09-1962	Piet Keizer	34	11
05-09-1962	Ferry Petersson	2	0
05-09-1962	Daan Schrijvers	22	1
26-09-1962	Jan Jongbloed	24	0
14-10-1962	Henk 'Charley' Bosveld	2	0
14-10-1962	Piet Ouderland	7	0
14-10-1962	Frits Soetekouw	1	0
14-10-1962	Jan Villerius	1	0
11-11-1962	Guus Haak	14	0
11-09-1963	Klaas Nuninga	19	4
20-10-1963	Henk Vriens	1	0
30-10-1963	Piet Giesen	1	0
22-03-1964	Lambert Verdonk	4	0
12-04-1964	Martin Koeman	1	0
29-04-1964	Chiel Haenen	1	0
30-09-1964	Dick Hollander	1	0
30-09-1964	Rinus Israel	47	3
30-09-1964	Hennie van Nee	5	2
30-09-1964	Willy Quadackers	1	0
25-10-1964	Piet Fransen	6	1
25-10-1964	Frans Geurtsen	1	1
25-10-1964	Peter Kemper	3	0
09-12-1964	Frits Flinkevleugel	11	0
07-04-1965	Theo Laseroms	6	1
17-10-1965	Joop Burgers	1	0
14-11-1965	Miel Pijs	8	1
23-03-1966	Willy van der Kuijlen	22	7
17-04-1966	Willy Dullens	4	0
07-09-1966	Johan Cruijff	48	33
18-09-1966	Kees Aarts	1	0
18-09-1966	Harry Heijnen	1	0
18-09-1966	Piet de Zoete	3	0
06-11-1966	Wim Suurbier	60	3
05-04-1967	Tonny van Leeuwen	2	0
05-04-1967	Jan Mulder	5	1
16-04-1967	Pim Doesburg	8	0
16-04-1967	Hans Eijkenbroek	18	0
13-09-1967	Jan Klijnjan	11	2
04-10-1967	Wim Jansen	65	1
01-11-1967	Jan van Gorp	1	0
29-11-1967	Jan van Beveren	32	0
29-11-1967	Theo Pahlplatz	13	3
29-11-1967	Piet Romeijn	4	1
29-11-1967	Henk Warnas	5	0
29-11-1967	Henk Wery	12	3
30-05-1968	Willem van Hanegem	52	6
30-05-1968	Rob Rensenbrink	46	14
05-06-1968	Wietze Veenstra	9	1
04-09-1968	Theo van Duivenbode	5	0
26-03-1969	Dick van Dijk	7	1
16-04-1969	Ad Brouwers	1	0
16-04-1969	Epi Drost	9	0
16-04-1969	Henk Houwaart	1	0
16-04-1969	Nico Rijnders	8	0
16-04-1969	Sjaak Roggeveen	3	3
07-09-1969	Pleun Strik	8	1
22-10-1969	Eddy Treijtel	5	0
05-11-1969	Ruud Krol	83	4
05-11-1969	Gerrie Mühren	10	0

== 1970–1979 ==
date of debut	name	number of caps	number of goals
28-01-1970	Willy Brokamp	6	6
11-10-1970	Wietze Couperus	1	0
11-11-1970	Johan Neeskens	49	17
24-02-1971	Willy Lippens	1	1
04-04-1971	Eef Mulders	1	0
10-10-1971	Barry Hulshoff	14	6
10-10-1971	Jan Jeuring	2	0
10-10-1971	Hans Venneker	4	0
17-11-1971	Oeki Hoekema	1	1
01-12-1971	Piet Schrijvers	46	0
16-02-1972	Theo de Jong	15	3
03-05-1972	Dick Schneider	11	2
30-08-1972	Arie Haan	35	6
30-08-1972	Aad Mansveld	6	0
28-03-1973	René van de Kerkhof	47	5
02-05-1973	John Rep	42	12
10-10-1973	Kees van Ierssel	6	0
27-03-1974	Chris Dekker	1	0
27-03-1974	Ruud Geels	20	11
27-03-1974	René Notten	5	0
05-06-1974	Willy van de Kerkhof	63	5
05-06-1974	Wim Rijsbergen	28	1
04-09-1974	Jan Peters	31	4
04-09-1974	Peter Ressel	3	0
30-04-1975	Peter Arntz	5	0
30-04-1975	Jan Everse	2	0
30-04-1975	Kees Kist	21	4
30-04-1975	Adri van Kraay	17	0
30-04-1975	Frans Thijssen	14	3
30-04-1975	Bobby Vosmaer	2	0
30-04-1975	Johan Zuidema	2	0
17-05-1975	Niels Overweg	4	0
30-05-1975	Nico Jansen	1	0
30-05-1975	Bert van Marwijk	1	0
30-05-1975	Heini Otto	1	0
30-05-1975	Henk van Rijnsoever	1	0
03-09-1975	Harry Lubse	1	1
15-10-1975	Kees Krijgh jr	2	0
19-06-1976	Wim Meutstege	1	0
08-09-1976	Jan Ruiter	1	0
09-02-1976	Hugo Hovenkamp	31	2
31-08-1977	Johnny Dusbaba	4	0
05-10-1977	Ernie Brandts	28	5
05-10-1977	Tsjeu La Ling	14	2
22-02-1978	Henk van Leeuwen	2	1
05-04-1978	Jan Boskamp	2	0
05-04-1978	Arnold Mühren	23	3
05-04-1978	Dick Nanninga	15	6
05-04-1978	Pierre Vermeulen	9	1
05-04-1978	Piet Wildschut	11	1
20-05-1978	Jan Poortvliet	19	1
14-06-1978	Dick Schoenaker	13	6
20-09-1978	Adri Koster	3	0
15-11-1978	John Metgod	21	4
24-02-1979	Huub Stevens	18	1
22-05-1979	Jan H Peters	1	0
22-05-1979	Simon Tahamata	22	2
26-09-1979	Michel van de Korput	23	0
26-09-1979	Michel Valke	16	0
26-09-1979	Ben Wijnstekers	36	1

== 1980–1989 ==
date of debut	name	number of caps	number of goals
26-03-1980	Luuk Balkestein	1	0
11-06-1980	Martien Vreijsen	1	0
10-09-1980	Jan van Deinsen	1	0
10-09-1980	Joop Hiele	7	0
10-09-1980	Toine van Mierlo	3	0
10-09-1980	Ronald Spelbos	21	1
11-10-1980	Hans van Breukelen	73	0
11-10-1980	Martin Jol	3	0
11-10-1980	Jos Jonker	2	0
11-10-1980	Keje Molenaar	2	0
11-10-1980	Pier Tol	5	0
22-02-1981	Cees Schapendonk	1	1
22-02-1981	Romeo Zondervan	1	0
25-03-1981	Edo Ophof	15	2
29-04-1981	Cees van Kooten	9	4
01-09-1981	Ruud Gullit	66	17
01-09-1981	Willy Janssen	1	0
01-09-1981	Wim Kieft	43	11
01-09-1981	Frank Rijkaard	73	10
14-04-1982	Jurrie Koolhof	5	0
14-04-1982	Gerald Vanenburg	42	1
25-05-1982	Peter Boeve	16	0
22-09-1982	René van der Gijp	15	2
10-11-1982	Edward Metgod	1	0
10-11-1982	Jan Wouters	70	4
19-12-1982	René Hofman	1	0
27-04-1983	Wim Hofkens	5	0
27-04-1983	Erwin Koeman	31	2
27-04-1983	Ronald Koeman	78	14
07-09-1983	Marco van Basten	58	24
07-09-1983	Bud Brocken	5	0
07-09-1983	Peter Houtman	8	7
21-09-1983	Adri van Tiggelen	56	0
12-10-1983	Sonny Silooy	25	0
14-03-1984	Andre Hoekstra	1	1
14-11-1984	Mario Been	1	0
14-11-1984	Ton Lokhoff	2	0
01-05-1985	Rob de Wit	8	3
20-11-1985	John van Loen	7	1
29-04-1986	Danny Blind	42	1
29-04-1986	John Bosman	30	17
29-04-1986	John van 't Schip	41	2
29-04-1986	Wilbert Suvrijn	9	0
25-03-1987	Aron Winter	84	6
09-09-1987	Henny Meijer	1	0
09-09-1987	Sjaak Troost	4	0
14-10-1987	Berry van Aerle	35	0
28-10-1987	Hans Gillhaus	9	2
16-12-1987	Hendrie Krüzen	5	0
16-12-1987	Joop Lankhaar	1	0
16-12-1987	John de Wolf	6	2
23-03-1988	Adick Koot	3	0
24-05-1988	Wim Koevermans	1	0
16-11-1988	René Eijkelkamp	6	0
16-11-1988	Pieter Huistra	8	0
16-11-1988	Rob Reekers	4	0
16-11-1988	Fred Rutten	1	0
04-01-1989	Juul Ellerman	5	0
04-01-1989	Rob Witschge	30	3
22-03-1989	Graeme Rutjes	13	1
22-03-1989	Theo Snelders	1	0
06-09-1989	Henk Fräser	6	0
06-09-1989	Stanley Menzo	6	0
06-09-1989	Bryan Roy	32	9
20-12-1989	Frank Berghuis	1	0
20-12-1989	Martin Laamers	2	0
20-12-1989	Bart Latuheru	1	0
20-12-1989	Edward Sturing	3	0

== 1990–1999 ==
date of debut	name	number of caps	number of goals
21-02-1990	Richard Witschge	31	1
28-03-1990	Marcel Peeper	1	0
26-09-1990	Dennis Bergkamp	79	37
26-09-1990	Frank de Boer	112	13
26-09-1990	Stan Valckx	20	0
21-11-1990	Jerry de Jong	3	0
19-12-1990	John van den Brom	2	1
13-03-1991	Marciano Vink	2	0
04-12-1991	Peter Bosz	8	0
12-02-1992	Gaston Taument	15	2
12-02-1992	Eric Viscaal	5	0
01-04-1992	Peter van Vossen	31	9
27-05-1992	Wim Jonk	49	11
14-10-1992	Arthur Numan	45	0
16-12-1992	Ed de Goey	31	0
24-02-1993	Johan de Kock	13	1
24-02-1993	Marc Overmars	86	17
24-03-1993	Regi Blinker	3	0
24-03-1993	Ronald de Boer	67	13
24-03-1993	Erik Meijer	1	0
09-06-1993	Ulrich van Gobbel	8	0
20-04-1994	Edgar Davids	74	6
12-10-1994	Michael Reiziger	72	1
16-11-1994	Patrick Kluivert	79	40
16-11-1994	Youri Mulder	9	3
14-12-1994	Pierre van Hooijdonk	46	14
14-12-1994	Clarence Seedorf	87	11
18-01-1995	Glenn Helder	4	0
18-01-1995	Michael Mols	6	0
22-02-1995	Michel Kreek	1	0
22-02-1995	Eric van der Luer	2	0
22-02-1995	Frank Verlaat	1	0
22-02-1995	Edwin Vurens	1	0
07-06-1995	Edwin van der Sar	130	0
06-09-1995	Orlando Trustfull	2	0
13-12-1995	Winston Bogarde	20	0
24-04-1996	Phillip Cocu	101	10
24-04-1996	Jordi Cruijff	9	1
24-04-1996	Jaap Stam	67	3
24-04-1996	John Veldman	1	0
31-08-1996	Giovanni van Bronckhorst	106	6
31-08-1996	Jean-Paul van Gastel	5	2
05-10-1996	Roy Makaay	43	6
05-10-1996	Ferdi Vierklau	2	0
30-04-1997	Boudewijn Zenden	54	7
24-02-1998	Ernest Faber	1	0
27-05-1998	Jimmy Floyd Hasselbaink	23	9
10-10-1998	Jeffrey Talan	8	1
13-10-1998	Oscar Moens	2	0
13-10-1998	Martijn Reuser	1	0
13-10-1998	Kees van Wonderen	5	0
18-11-1998	Dries Boussatta	3	0
18-11-1998	Marc van Hintum	8	0
18-11-1998	Ruud van Nistelrooy	70	35
31-03-1999	Bert Konterman	12	0
05-06-1999	André Ooijer	55	3
08-06-1999	Sander Westerveld	6	0

== 2000–2009 ==
date of debut	name	number of caps	number of goals
29-03-2000	Paul Bosvelt	24	0
02-09-2000	Wilfred Bouma	37	2
02-09-2000	Arnold Bruggink	2	0
07-10-2000	Mark van Bommel	79	10
11-10-2000	Mario Melchiot	22	0
11-10-2000	Jan Vennegoor of Hesselink	19	3
15-11-2000	Kevin Hofland	7	0
15-11-2000	Patrick Paauwe	5	0
15-11-2000	Fernando Ricksen	12	0
28-02-2001	Victor Sikora	6	0
02-06-2001	Denny Landzaat	38	1
15-08-2001	Niels Oude Kamphuis	1	0
15-08-2001	Ronald Waterreus	7	0
06-10-2001	Rafael van der Vaart	109	25
10-11-2001	George Boateng	4	0
19-05-2002	Andy van der Meyde	18	1
30-04-2003	Arjen Robben	96	37
30-04-2003	Wesley Sneijder	134	31
18-02-2004	John Heitinga	87	7
31-03-2004	Nigel de Jong	81	1
18-08-2004	Dave van den Bergh	2	0
18-08-2004	Romeo Castelen	10	1
18-08-2004	Collins John	2	0
18-08-2004	Jan Kromkamp	16	0
03-09-2004	Khalid Boulahrouz	35	0
03-09-2004	Romano Denneboom	1	0
03-09-2004	Dirk Kuyt	101	24
03-09-2004	Maarten Stekelenburg	58	0
17-11-2004	Barry van Galen	1	0
17-11-2004	Joris Mathijsen	84	3
09-02-2005	Uğur Yıldırım	1	0
26-03-2005	Ryan Babel	63	10
26-03-2005	Hedwiges Maduro	18	0
04-06-2005	Theo Lucius	3	0
04-06-2005	Barry Opdam	8	1
04-06-2005	Robin van Persie	102	50
17-08-2005	Tim de Cler	17	0
08-10-2005	Ron Vlaar	32	1
12-11-2005	Henk Timmer	7	0
01-03-2006	Kew Jaliens	10	0
01-03-2006	Martijn Meerdink	1	0
01-03-2006	Nicky Hofs	1	0
16-08-2006	Klaas-Jan Huntelaar	76	42
16-08-2006	Stijn Schaars	24	0
16-08-2006	Urby Emanuelson	16	0
16-08-2006	Theo Janssen	5	0
07-02-2007	David Mendes da Silva	7	0
28-03-2007	Ibrahim Afellay	53	7
28-03-2007	Danny Koevermans	4	1
28-03-2007	Demy de Zeeuw	27	0
02-06-2007	Andwélé Slory	2	0
02-06-2007	Orlando Engelaar	14	0
11-10-2008	Dirk Marcellis	3	0
19-11-2008	Michel Vorm	15	0
11-02-2009	Edson Braafheid	10	0
11-02-2009	Gregory van der Wiel	46	0
05-09-2009	Eljero Elia	30	2
05-09-2009	Glenn Loovens	2	0
05-09-2009	Piet Velthuizen	1	0
18-11-2009	Wout Brama	3	0

== 2010–2019 ==
number	date of debut	name	date of birth	number of caps	number of goals	date of death†
701	26-05-2010	Vurnon Anita	4 April 1989	3	0	
702	26-05-2010	Sander Boschker	20 October 1970	1	0	
703	11-08-2010	Jeffrey Bruma	13 November 1991	25	1	
704	11-08-2010	Siem de Jong	28 January 1989	6	2	
705	11-08-2010	Jeremain Lens	24 November 1987	34	8	
706	11-08-2010	Erik Pieters	7 August 1988	18	0	
707	11-08-2010	Leroy Fer	5 January 1990	11	1	
708	11-08-2010	Roy Beerens	22 December 1987	2	0	
709	11-08-2010	Ricky van Wolfswinkel	27 January 1989	2	0	
710	07-11-2010	Royston Drenthe	8 April 1987	1	0	
711	07-11-2010	Peter Wisgerhof	19 November 1979	2	0	
712	09-02-2011	Kevin Strootman	13 February 1990	46	3	
713	09-02-2011	Luuk de Jong	27 August 1990	39	8	
714	04-06-2011	Tim Krul	3 April 1988	15	0	
715	02-09-2011	Georginio Wijnaldum	11 November 1990	101	28	
716	26-05-2012	Jetro Willems	30 March 1994	22	0	
717	30-05-2012	Luciano Narsingh	13 September 1990	19	4	
718	15-08-2012	Jordy Clasie	27 June 1991	17	0	
719	15-08-2012	Adam Maher	20 July 1993	5	0	
720	15-08-2012	Bruno Martins Indi	8 February 1992	36	2	
721	15-08-2012	Ricardo van Rhijn	13 June 1991	8	0	
722	15-08-2012	Nick Viergever	3 August 1989	3	0	
723	15-08-2012	Stefan de Vrij	5 February 1992	89	5	
724	07-09-2012	Daryl Janmaat	22 July 1989	34	0	
725	12-10-2012	Ruben Schaken	3 April 1982	7	2	
726	14-11-2012	Marco van Ginkel	1 December 1992	8	0	
727	14-11-2012	Kenneth Vermeer	10 January 1986	5	0	
728	06-02-2013	Daley Blind	9 March 1990	110	3	
729	06-02-2013	Jonathan de Guzmán	13 September 1987	14	0	
730	06-02-2013	Ola John	19 May 1992	1	0	
731	07-06-2013	Jasper Cillessen	22 April 1989	65	0	
732	07-06-2013	Miquel Nelom	22 September 1990	2	0	
733	07-06-2013	Jens Toornstra	4 April 1989	4	0	
734	07-06-2013	Dwight Tiendalli	21 October 1985	2	0	
735	14-08-2013	Paul Verhaegh	1 September 1983	3	0	
736	15-10-2013	Memphis Depay	13 February 1994	121	57	
737	19-11-2013	Patrick van Aanholt	29 August 1990	19	0	
738	19-11-2013	Joël Veltman	15 January 1992	28	2	
739	05-03-2014	Jean-Paul Boëtius	22 March 1994	1	0	
740	05-03-2014	Davy Klaassen	21 February 1993	41	10	
741	05-03-2014	Quincy Promes	4 January 1992	50	7	
742	05-03-2014	Karim Rekik	2 December 1994	4	0	
743	17-05-2014	Terence Kongolo	14 February 1994	4	0	
744	28-03-2015	Bas Dost	31 May 1989	18	1	
745	05-06-2015	Davy Pröpper	2 September 1991	19	3	
746	06-09-2015	Jaïro Riedewald	9 September 1996	3	0	
747	10-10-2015	Anwar El Ghazi	3 May 1995	2	0	
748	10-10-2015	Kenny Tete	9 October 1995	14	0	
749	10-10-2015	Virgil van Dijk	8 July 1991	107	15	
750	10-10-2015	Jeroen Zoet	6 January 1991	11	0	
751	13-11-2015	Riechedly Bazoer	12 October 1996	6	0	
752	25-03-2016	Vincent Janssen	15 June 1994	22	7	
753	27-05-2016	Steven Berghuis	19 December 1991	46	2	
754	04-06-2016	Tonny Vilhena	3 January 1995	15	0	
755	01-09-2016	Jorrit Hendrix	6 February 1995	1	0	
756	07-10-2016	Rick Karsdorp	11 February 1995	3	0	
757	09-11-2016	Joshua Brenet	20 March 1994	2	0	
758	09-11-2016	Bart Ramselaar	29 June 1996	3	0	
759	13-11-2016	Marten de Roon	29 March 1991	44	1	
760	25-03-2017	Matthijs de Ligt	12 August 1999	56	2	
761	25-03-2017	Wesley Hoedt	6 March 1994	6	0	
762	31-05-2017	Nathan Aké	18 February 1995	71	5	
763	31-08-2017	Timothy Fosu-Mensah	2 January 1998	3	0	
764	14-11-2017	Donny van de Beek	18 April 1997	19	3	
765	23-03-2018	Hans Hateboer	9 January 1994	13	0	
766	23-03-2018	Wout Weghorst	7 August 1992	63	18	
767	26-03-2018	Justin Kluivert	5 May 1999	14	0	
768	26-03-2018	Guus Til	22 December 1997	9	1	
769	31-05-2018	Ruud Vormer	11 May 1988	4	0	
770	06-09-2018	Frenkie de Jong	12 May 1997	70	2	
771	13-10-2018	Denzel Dumfries	18 April 1996	86	13	
772	13-10-2018	Steven Bergwijn	8 October 1997	38	8	
773	13-10-2018	Arnaut Danjuma	31 January 1997	6	2	
774	16-10-2018	Pablo Rosario	7 January 1997	1	0	
775	19-11-2018	Javairô Dilrosun	22 June 1998	1	0	
776	06-09-2019	Donyell Malen	19 January 1999	65	16	
777	19-11-2019	Calvin Stengs	18 December 1998	8	3	
778	19-11-2019	Myron Boadu	14 January 2001	1	1	

== 2020–present ==
number	date of debut	name	date of birth	number of caps	number of goals	date of death†
779	07-10-2020	Owen Wijndal	2 November 1999	11	0	
780	07-10-2020	Teun Koopmeiners	28 February 1998	32	3	
781	11-11-2020	Marco Bizot	10 March 1991	1	0	
782	24-03-2021	Ryan Gravenberch	16 May 2002	36	1	
783	02-06-2021	Jurriën Timber	17 June 2001	28	0	
784	21-06-2021	Cody Gakpo	7 May 1999	65	28	
785	01-09-2021	Justin Bijlow	22 January 1998	8	0	
786	04-09-2021	Tyrell Malacia	17 August 1999	9	0	
787	07-09-2021	Devyne Rensch	18 January 2003	2	0	
788	08-10-2021	Noa Lang	17 June 1999	17	3	
789	26-03-2022	Mark Flekken	13 June 1993	12	0	
790	08-06-2022	Jerdy Schouten	12 January 1997	27	0	
791	08-06-2022	Jordan Teze	30 September 1999	4	0	
792	22-09-2022	Remko Pasveer	8 November 1983	2	0	
793	22-09-2022	Kenneth Taylor	16 May 2002	5	0	
794	21-11-2022	Andries Noppert	7 April 1994	5	0	
795	03-12-2022	Xavi Simons	21 April 2003	45	9	
796	24-03-2023	Lutsharel Geertruida	18 July 2000	28	0	
797	27-03-2023	Mats Wieffer	16 November 1999	16	1	
798	18-06-2023	Joey Veerman	19 November 1998	24	1	
799	07-09-2023	Tijjani Reijnders	16 November 1999	46	9	
800	13-10-2023	Bart Verbruggen	18 August 2002	45	0	
801	13-10-2023	Quilindschy Hartman	14 November 2001	5	1	
802	13-10-2023	Jeremie Frimpong	10 December 2000	21	2	
803	13-10-2023	Micky van de Ven	19 April 2001	32	1	
804	16-10-2023	Brian Brobbey	1 February 2002	21	4	
805	21-11-2023	Jorrel Hato	7 March 2006	11	0	
806	21-11-2023	Thijs Dallinga	3 August 2000	1	0	
807	26-03-2024	Quinten Timber	17 June 2001	14	1	
808	06-07-2024	Joshua Zirkzee	22 May 2001	11	2	
809	10-09-2024	Jan Paul van Hecke	8 June 2000	17	1	
810	23-03-2025	Ian Maatsen	10 March 2002	1	1	
811	07-09-2025	Sem Steijn	12 November 2001	1	0	
812	14-11-2025	Emmanuel Emegha	3 February 2002	2	0	
813	17-11-2025	Luciano Valente	4 October 2003	2	0	
814	27-03-2026	Kees Smit	20 January 2006	1	0	
815	03-06-2026	Robin Roefs	17 January 2003	1	0	
816	03-06-2026	Crysencio Summerville	30 October 2001	6	2	
