= List of Netherlands international footballers born outside the Netherlands =

This list includes all the 83 players born outside the Netherlands who played at least one match for the Netherlands national football team. Most of this players were born in Indonesia while it was part of the Dutch East Indies and in Suriname. There are also naturalized players like Jonathan De Guzmán or immigrants like Ola and Collins John.

Players in bold are still active for the national team. The list is updated as of 26 March 2023.

== Born in Indonesia ==
=== Born during the Dutch East Indies ===
- Law Adam 1930–1933
- Jan Akkersdĳk 1908
- Beb Bakhuys 1928–1937
- Hans Blume 1907
- Leo Bosschart 1909–1920
- Nico Bouvy 1912–1913
- Frans De Brujin Kops 1906–1908
- Eddy De Neve 1905–1906
- Guus De Seriere 1911–1912
- Jo Eshuijs 1906
- Jacques Francken 1914
- Mannes Francken 1906–1914
- Just Göbel 1911–1919
- Vic Gonsalves 1909–1910
- Jur Haak 1912–1913
- Karel Heijting 1907–1910
- Max Henny 1907
- Dé Kessler 1909–1922
- Dolf Kessler 1905–1906
- Jan Kok 1908
- Terus Küchlin 1925–1926
- Harry Kuneman 1908
- Lo La Chapelle 1907
- Anton Lens 1906
- Dick MacNeill 1920
- Miel Mundt 1909
- Herman Peltzer 1909
- Marius Sandberg 1926
- Edu Snethlage 1907–1909
- Dick Snoek 1950–1951
- Albert Snouck Hurgronje 1924–1925
- Eetje Sol 1908–1909
- Cees ten Cate 1912
- Piet Valkenburg 1912
- Jan van Breda Kolff 1911–1913
- Dolf van der Nagel 1914
- Fred van der Poel 1923
- Lothar van Gogh 1907
- Guus van Hecking Colenbrander 1908
- Hans van Kesteren 1929
- Miel van Leijden 1910
- Oscar van Rappard 1920
- Ben Verweij 1919–1924
- Rens Vis 1926
- Henk Wamsteker 1925–1929
- David Wijnveldt 1912–1914

== Born in Suriname ==
=== Born while part of the Kingdom of the Netherlands ===
- Regi Blinker 1993–1994
- Edgar Davids 1994–2005
- Jerry de Jong 1990–1991
- Henk Fraser 1989–1992
- Jimmy Floyd Hasselbaink 1998–2002
- Henny Meijer 1987
- Stanley Menzo 1989–1992
- Humphrey Mijnals 1960
- Ulrich van Gobbel 1993–1994
- John Veldman 1996
- Marciano Vink 1991
- Aron Winter 1987–2000
- Romeo Zondervan 1981

=== Born after the 1975 Independence ===
- Edson Braafheid 2009–2011
- Romeo Castelen 2004–2007
- Clarence Seedorf 1994–2008
- Andwelé Slory 2007
- Dwight Tiendalli 2013
- **Owen Wijndal** 2020–

== Born in Curaçao ==
=== Netherlands Antilles ===
- Vurnon Anita 2010

== Born in other countries ==
=== Australia ===
- Graeme Rutjes 1989–1991

=== Belgium ===
- Toon Brusselers 1955–1962
- Youri Mulder 1994–2001

=== Canada ===
- John van 't Schip 1986–1995
- Jonathan de Guzmán 2013–2015

=== Germany ===
- Willi Lippens 1971

=== Ghana ===
- George Boateng 2001–2006

=== Liberia ===
- Collins John 2004
- Ola John 2013

=== Malaysia ===
- Joop Boutmy 1912–1914

=== Morocco ===
- Adam Maher 2012–2013

=== Nigeria ===
- **Arnaut Danjuma** 2018–

=== Portugal ===
- **Bruno Martins Indi** 2012–

=== Switzerland ===
- Luuk de Jong 2011–2022
- Siem de Jong 2010–2013
- **Terence Kongolo** 2014–

=== Zambia ===
- **Guus Til** 2018–

== List by country of birth ==
Country	Total	Notes
Indonesia	46	46 players born during the Dutch East Indies
Suriname	19	12 players born while the country was part of the Kingdom of the Netherlands
Switzerland	3	
Belgium	2	
Canada	2	
Liberia	2	
Australia	1	
Curaçao	1	1 player born in the Netherlands Antilles
Germany	1	
Ghana	1	
Malaysia	1	
Morocco	1	
Nigeria	1	
Portugal	1	
Zambia	1	
