= Colenbrander =

Colenbrander is a Dutch surname. It may refer to:

- Antonius Colenbrander, a Dutch Olympic horse rider
- Guus van Hecking Colenbrander (1887–1945), a Dutch soccer player
- Herman Theodoor Colenbrander, a Dutch historian
- Johan(nes) Wilhelm Colenbrander (1855 – 1918), Natal born colonial official and soldier
- Theo Colenbrander (1841–1930), Dutch architect, ceramist, plaque painter, and designer
