= Nico Buwalda =

Dutch footballer

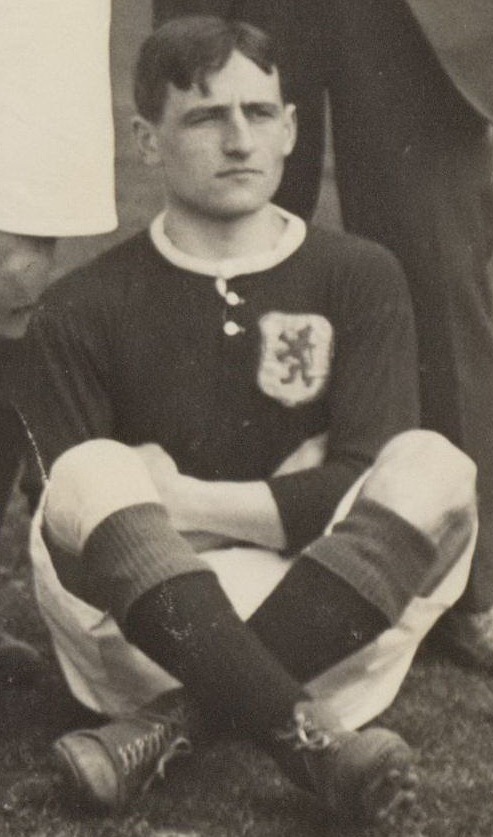

Personal information
- Full name: Nicolaas Reindert Jouwers Buwalda
- Date of birth: 25 June 1890
- Place of birth: Weesp, Netherlands
- Date of death: 13 June 1970 (aged 79)
- Place of death: Bussum, Netherlands
- Position: Winger

Senior career*
Years	Team	Apps	(Gls)
1906–1913	Rapiditas Weesp		
1913–1914	Ajax	20	(3)
1914–1920	Hercules		
1920–1922	Rapiditas		
1922–1923	Ajax	8	(0)
1923–1924	Rapiditas		

International career
1914	Netherlands	2	(0)
- * Club domestic league appearances and goals

Nico Buwalda (25 June 1890 – 13 June 1970) was a Dutch male footballer.

== Club career ==
On club level he played for local side Rapiditas, Hercules and for Ajax, where he played alongside iconic defender Gé Fortgens.

== International career ==
He was part of the Netherlands national football team, playing 2 matches against Germany and Belgium. He played his first match on 5 April 1914.

== See also ==
- List of Dutch international footballers
