= Willem Janssen =

Willem Janssen may refer to:

- Willem Janssen (footballer, born 1880) (1880–1976), Dutch footballer
- Willem Janssen (footballer, born 1986), Dutch footballer
