= Jan Noorduijn =

Dutch footballer

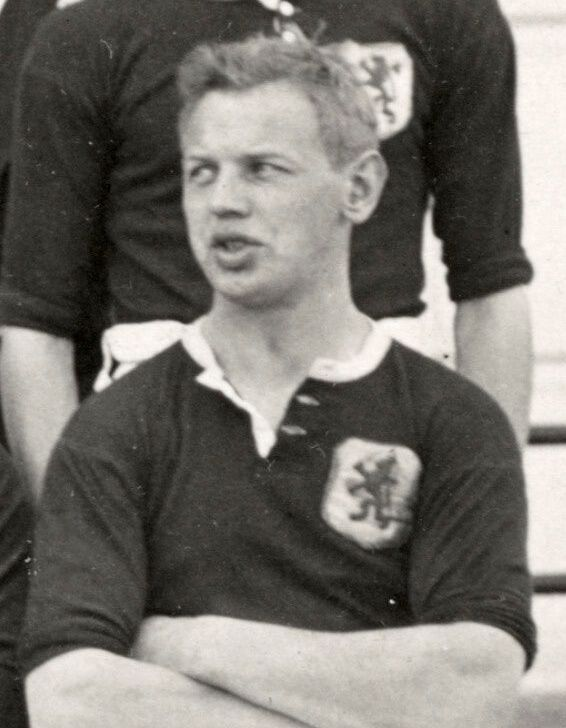
- Noorduijn (1914)

Personal information
- Full name: Johannes Noorduijn
- Date of birth: 30 August 1889
- Place of birth: Nijmegen
- Date of death: 16 February 1957 (aged 67)
- Place of death: Saint-Jean-Cap-Ferrat

Senior career*
Years	Team	Apps	(Gls)
1909–10	Dordrechtse Football Club	16	(?)
1910–16	HVV Den Haag	86	(34)

International career
1914–	Netherlands	4	(0)
- * Club domestic league appearances and goals

Jan Noorduijn (30 August 1889 – 16 February 1957) was a Dutch male footballer. He was part of the Netherlands national football team, playing 4 matches. He played his first match on 15 March 1914.

== See also ==
- List of Dutch international footballers
