= John Heijning =

Dutch footballer

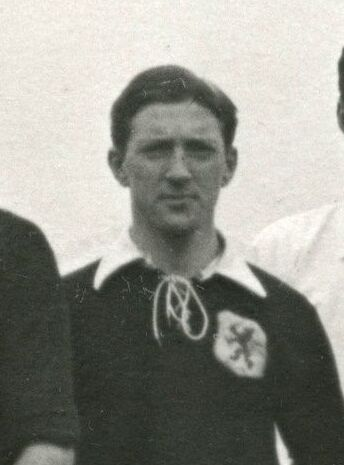
- John Heijning in 1912

Personal information
- Full name: Johannes Cornelis Heijning
- Date of birth: 12 December 1884
- Place of birth: Buitenzorg, Dutch East Indies
- Date of death: 19 May 1947 (aged 62)
- Place of death: Hilversum, Netherlands
- Position: Defender

Senior career*
Years	Team	Apps	(Gls)
1900-1913	HVV Den Haag		

International career
1900–1912	Netherlands	8	(0)
- * Club domestic league appearances and goals

John Heijning (12 December 1884 – 19 May 1947) was a Dutch footballer. He was part of the Netherlands national football team, playing 8 matches between 1907 and 1912.

== Club career ==
Heijning made his debut for HVV Den Haag in 1900 and he went on to captain the team. He later became a legal professional.

== International career ==
He played his first match on 1 April 1907. He was also part of the Dutch squad for the football tournament at the 1908 Summer Olympics, but he did not play in any matches.

== See also ==
- List of Dutch international footballers
