= Willem Boerdam =

Dutch footballer

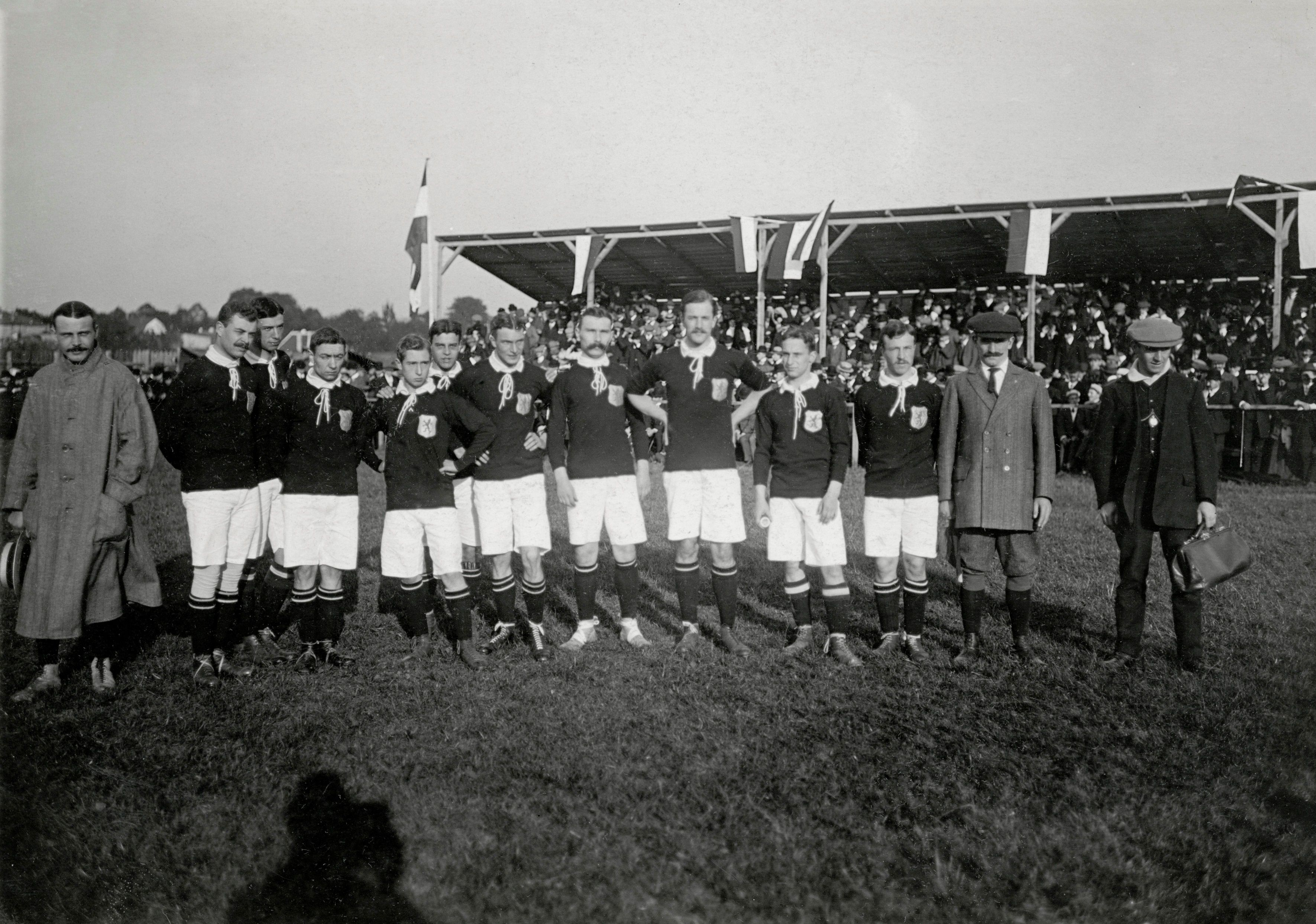
- Boerdam with Dutch squad (1910)

Personal information
- Date of birth: 2 November 1883
- Place of birth: Vlaardingen, Netherlands
- Date of death: 7 November 1966 (aged 83)
- Place of death: Rotterdam, Netherlands
- Position: Midfielder

Senior career*
Years	Team	Apps	(Gls)
1908–1921	Sparta		

International career
1909–1920	Netherlands	2	(0)
- * Club domestic league appearances and goals

Willem Boerdam (2 November 1883 – 7 November 1966) was a Dutch footballer. He was part of the Netherlands national football team, playing 2 matches.

== Career ==
An agile and stocky technician, he was nicknamed Willem de Springer (Willem the Jumper) because of his athletic footballing style. He played the majority of his career for Sparta.

He played his first match on 25 April 1909. He was part of the Dutch team at the 1908 Summer Olympics, but because he did not play he didn't get a bronze medal.

== See also ==
- List of Dutch international footballers
