= Philip van Dijk (footballer) =

Dutch footballer

Personal information
- Full name: Philippus Gottlieb Anthonie van Dijk
- Date of birth: 9 August 1885
- Place of birth: Utrecht, Netherlands
- Date of death: 10 April 1937 (aged 51)
- Place of death: Arnhem, Netherlands
- Position: Midfielder

Senior career*
| Years | Team | Apps | (Gls) |
| 1901-1914 | USV Hercules | | |

International career
| 1910 | Netherlands | 1 | (0) |
- * Club domestic league appearances and goals

Philip van Dijk (9 August 1885 – 10 April 1937) was a Dutch footballer.

== International career ==
He was part of the Netherlands national football team, playing 1 match on 16 October 1910 against Germany.

== Personal life ==
In later life he became a physician and worked for the Dutch army. He had been married to Martha Cool and Gerda Bastiaanse and passed away in Arnhem, in 1937.

== See also ==
- List of Dutch international footballers
