= Georg Beijers =

Dutch footballer (1895–1978)

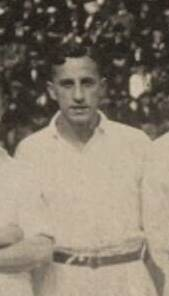
- Beijers (1919)

Personal information
- Full name: Cornelis George Adolf Beijers
- Date of birth: 3 December 1895
- Place of birth: Rotterdam
- Date of death: 3 June 1978 (aged 82)
- Place of death: Bennebroek
- Position: Striker

Senior career*
Years	Team	Apps	(Gls)
1918–1920	V.O.C.		

International career
1919	Netherlands	1	(0)
- * Club domestic league appearances and goals

Georg Beijers (3 December 1895 – 3 June 1978) was a Dutch male footballer.

== Club career ==
Born in Rotterdam, Beijers played for local side V.O.C.

== International career ==
He was part of the Netherlands national football team, playing 1 match on 24 August 1919 against Sweden.

== See also ==
- List of Dutch international footballers
