= Piet Tekelenburg =

Dutch footballer (1894–1945)

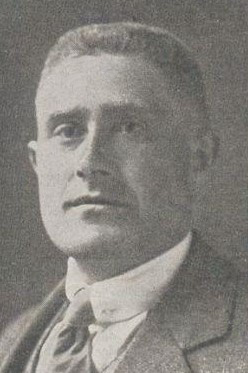
- Tekelenburg in 1919

Personal information
- Full name: Pieter Tekelenburg
- Date of birth: 6 November 1894
- Place of birth: Haarlem, Netherlands
- Date of death: 1 April 1945 (aged 50)
- Place of death: Pangkal Pinang, Dutch East Indies
- Height: 1.81 m (5 ft 11 in)

Senior career*
Years	Team	Apps	(Gls)
- HFC Haarlem

International career
1919	Netherlands	2	(0)
- * Club domestic league appearances and goals

Piet Tekelenburg (6 November 1894 – 1 April 1945) was a Dutch footballer. He was part of the Netherlands national team, playing two matches. He played his first match on 9 June 1919.

Tekelenburg became a physician. Since 1927 he worked in the Dutch East Indies as a medical officer at the KNIL.

At the age of 50, he died in a Japanese-run internment camp and was buried in Dutch War Cemetery Leuwigajah in Cimahi, West Java.

== See also ==
- List of Dutch international footballers
