= Wim Bronger =

Dutch footballer

Personal information
- Full name: Willem Bronger
- Date of birth: 18 January 1888
- Place of birth: Rotterdam
- Date of death: 25 February 1965 (aged 77)
- Place of death: Ede, Gelderland

Senior career*
Years	Team	Apps	(Gls)
1909-1915	V.O.C.		

International career
1912	Netherlands	1	(0)
- * Club domestic league appearances and goals

Wim Bronger (18 January 1888 – 25 February 1965) was a Dutch footballer.

== Club career ==
Bronger was one of only five VOC players to play for the national team.

== International career ==
He was part of the Netherlands national football team, playing 1 match on 10 March 1912 against Belgium.

== See also ==
- List of Dutch international footballers
