= Barend van Hemert =

Dutch footballer

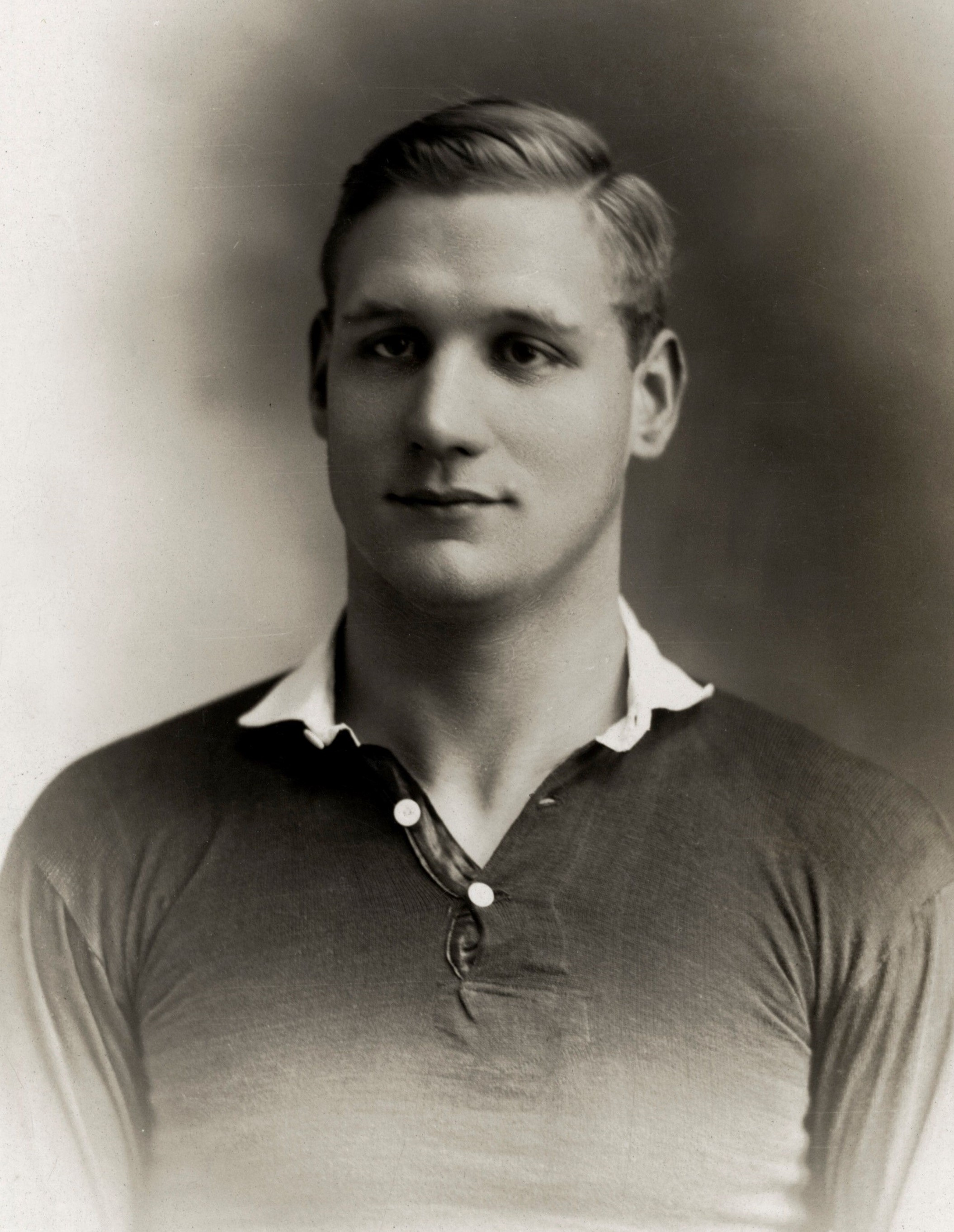
- Van Hemert in 1914

Personal information
- Full name: Barend Arnold van Hemert
- Date of birth: 10 May 1891
- Place of birth: Dordrecht, Netherlands
- Date of death: 5 January 1945 (aged 53)
- Place of death: Warsaw, Poland
- Position: Goalkeeper

Senior career*
Years	Team	Apps	(Gls)
1912-1920	DFC		

International career
1914	Netherlands	1	(0)
- * Club domestic league appearances and goals

Barend Arnold van Hemert (10 May 1891 – between 5–17 January 1945) was a Dutch male footballer. He was part of the Netherlands national football team, playing 1 match on 17 May 1914.

== Career ==
Van Hemert also had reputation as an all-round sportsman, being an able swimmer, boxer and shot putter. He used his boxing skills helpfully while attending (not playing) a Netherlands versus Germany international football match at Leipzig in 1912, when he intervened to help extricate the Austrian referee from German supporters who had invaded the pitch protesting the referee's decision against a German player. In 1922, he set a Dutch national record for shot put by throwing it 12.21 metres.

A big goalkeeper, van Hemert was crucial in DFC's Dutch Cup final win against Haarlem in 1914.

== Personal life ==
Van Hemert was professionally a leather goods merchant in Dordrecht whose business was ruined in the economic depression of the 1930s.

During World War II, following the occupation of his country by Nazi Germany in 1940, Van Hemert, despite his relatively late age, enlisted in the Wehrmacht in 1941 and served on the Eastern Front. He lost his life, aged 53, between 5 and 17 January 1945 in the Warsaw area of Poland. In 2013, an investigation concluded that Hemert had been conscripted, rather than joining voluntarily. He had died as a POW and was rehabilitated in by the KNVB in 2022.

In 1923 Van Hemert married Petronella Jacoba Margaretha Hofman (1903-1934), from whom he divorced in 1930.

== See also ==
- List of Dutch international footballers
