= Jan van Beek =

Dutch footballer (1880–1954)

Personal information
- Full name: Johan Anton van Beek
- Date of birth: 22 October 1880
- Place of birth: The Hague, Netherlands
- Date of death: 2 September 1954 (aged 73)
- Place of death: Utrecht, Netherlands
- Position: Forward

Senior career*
Years	Team	Apps	(Gls)
1897–1898	Swift Den Haag		
1898–1902	Victoria Wageningen		
1902–1904	AFC Quick 1890		
1906–1907	Quick (Kampen)		
1907–1909	LAC Frisia 1883		

International career
1907	Netherlands	1	(0)
- * Club domestic league appearances and goals

Johan Anton ''Jan'' van Beek (22 October 1880 – 2 September 1954) was a Dutch footballer who played as a forward.

== Club career ==
Van Beek was born in Kampen, Netherlands. He played for local side Swift as well as for Victoria Wageningen, AFC Quick 1890, Quick (Kampen) and LAC Frisia 1883 before leaving for the Dutch East Indies.

== International career ==
He was part of the Netherlands national team, making one appearance on 1 April 1907 against England.

== See also ==
- List of Dutch international footballers
