= Pieter Boelmans ter Spill =

Dutch footballer

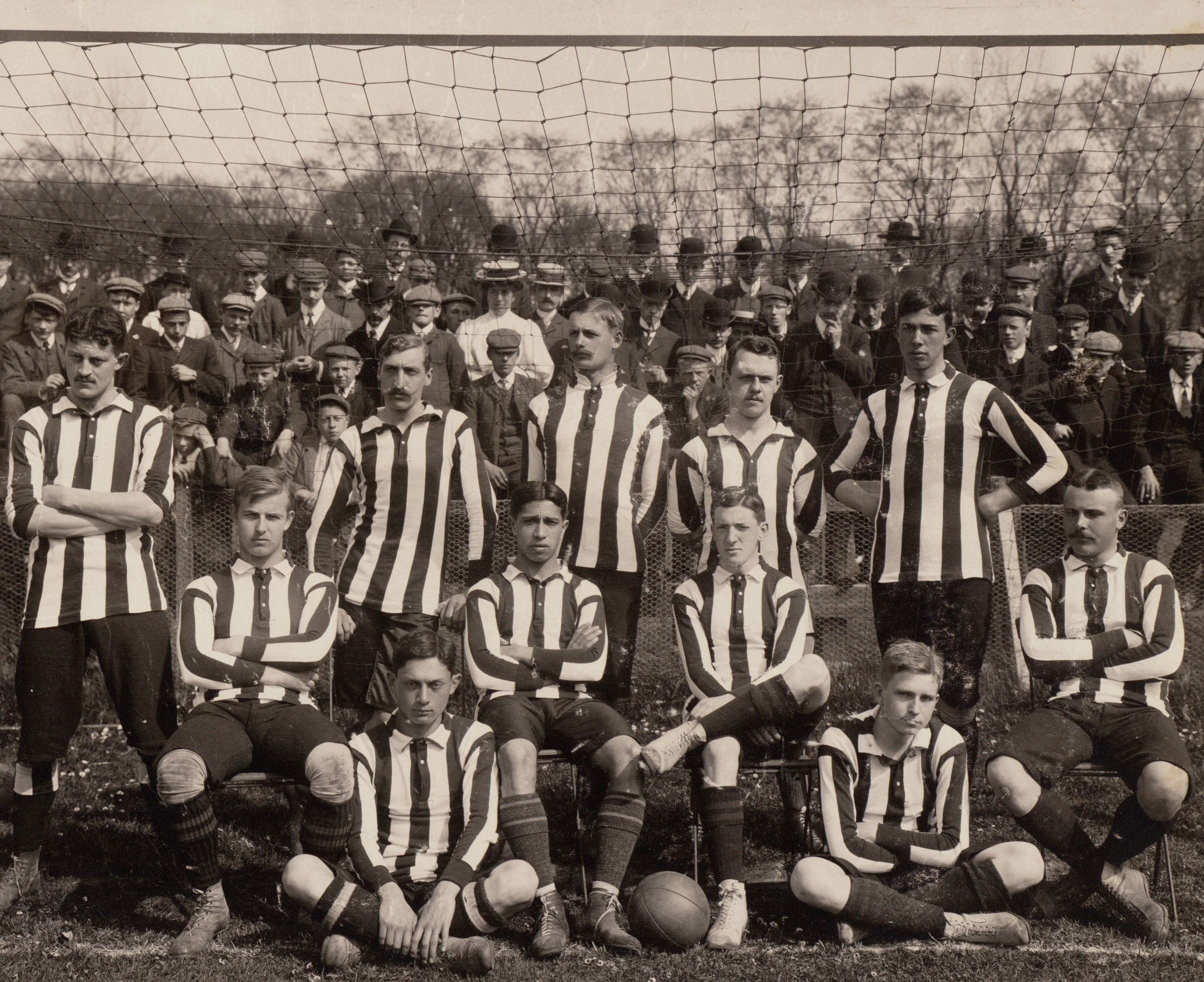
- Boelmans ter Spill, standing, in the middle (Netherlands team 1907)

Personal information
- Date of birth: 26 January 1886
- Place of birth: Alkmaar, the Netherlands
- Date of death: 31 October 1954 (aged 68)
- Place of death: The Hague, Netherlands

Senior career*
Years	Team	Apps	(Gls)
1905-1910	HFC		
1911-1912	Alcmaria Victrix		

International career
1907	Netherlands	3	(0)
- * Club domestic league appearances and goals

Pieter Boelmans ter Spill (26 January 1886 – 31 October 1954) was a Dutch male footballer.

== Club career ==
Born in 1886 in Alkmaar to Hendrik Boelmans ter Spill and Neeltje Boon, Boelmans ter Spill was a big center-forward who played for HFC.

== International career ==
He was part of the Netherlands national football team, playing 3 matches. He played his first match on 1 April 1907 against England.

== See also ==
- List of Dutch international footballers
