= Huub Felix =

Dutch footballer

Bèr Felix
Personal information
- Full name: Jacobus Hubertus "Huub" Felix
- Date of birth: 8 April 1895
- Place of birth: Maastricht
- Date of death: 28 July 1967 (aged 72)
- Place of death: Maastricht

Youth career
- Juliana

Senior career*
Years	Team	Apps	(Gls)
1913–1917	MSV Maastricht		
1917–1918	NAC		
1918–1932	MVV		

International career
1919	Netherlands	1	(0)
- * Club domestic league appearances and goals

Jacobus Hubertus "Bèr" Felix (8 April 1895 – 28 July 1967) was a Dutch footballer.

== Club career ==
A big striker, Felix played the majority of his career for local side MVV. In a match with RFC Roermond in 1929, Felix got caught up in a brawl with Pierre Massy and became the first Dutch player to make his way to a civil judge for an incident during a football match. He had started his career with hometown club MSV Maastricht before joining NAC in 2017.

== International career ==
He was part of the Netherlands national football team, playing 1 match on 31 August 1919 against Norway. He was the first player from Limburg to play for the national team.

== See also ==
- List of Dutch international footballers
