= Wim Groskamp =

Dutch footballer

Personal information
- Full name: Willem Remelius Groskamp
- Date of birth: 8 October 1886
- Place of birth: Amsterdam, Netherlands
- Date of death: 13 January 1974 (aged 87)
- Place of death: The Hague, Netherlands

Senior career*
Years	Team	Apps	(Gls)
- Quick

International career
1908	Netherlands	1	(0)
- * Club domestic league appearances and goals

Wim Groskamp (8 October 1886 – 13 January 1974) was a Dutch male footballer.

He was part of the Netherlands national football team, playing 1 match on 25 October 1908. He was also part of the Dutch squad for the football tournament at the 1908 Summer Olympics, but he did not play in any matches.

== See also ==
- List of Dutch international footballers
