= Arie Bijvoet =

Dutch footballer

Personal information
- Full name: Andries Rudolf Cornelis Bijvoet
- Date of birth: 27 February 1891
- Place of birth: Leeuwarden, Netherlands
- Date of death: 12 November 1976 (aged 85)
- Place of death: The Hague, Netherlands
- Position: Midfielder

Senior career*
Years	Team	Apps	(Gls)
1908-1910	Kampong		
1910-1912	Velocitas		
1912-1914	DFC		
1914-1915	K HFC		
1915-1917	HVV		

International career
1913	Netherlands	1	(0)
- * Club domestic league appearances and goals

Arie Bijvoet (27 February 1891 – 12 November 1976) was a Dutch footballer.

== Club career ==
Bijvoet was a midfielder who played for DFC and Kampong.

== International career ==
He was part of the Netherlands national football team, playing 1 match on 20 April 1913 against Belgium.

== Personal life ==
Arie Bijvoet married Irena Neeckx in 1919. She died in 1970. Arie Bijvoet was in the military.

== See also ==
- List of Dutch international footballers
