= Kees van Nieuwenhuizen =

Dutch footballer

Personal information
- Date of birth: 21 April 1884
- Place of birth: The Hague
- Date of death: 12 October 1981 (aged 97)
- Place of death: The Hague

Senior career*
Years	Team	Apps	(Gls)
- Sparta Rotterdam

International career
1909	Netherlands	2	(0)
- * Club domestic league appearances and goals

Kees van Nieuwenhuizen (21 April 1884 – 12 October 1981) was a Dutch male footballer. He was part of the Netherlands national football team, playing 2 matches. He played his first match on 21 March 1909.

== See also ==
- List of Dutch international footballers
