= Noud Stempels =

Dutch footballer

Personal information
- Full name: Reinier Stempels
- Date of birth: 4 April 1882
- Place of birth: Rijswijk
- Date of death: 12 October 1970 (aged 88)
- Place of death: Heerde
- Position: Midfielder

Senior career*
Years	Team	Apps	(Gls)
- Quick Den Haag

International career
1908	Netherlands	3	(0)
- * Club domestic league appearances and goals

Noud Stempels (4 April 1882 – 12 October 1970) was a Dutch footballer. He was part of the Netherlands national football team, playing 3 matches. He played his first match on 29 March 1908. He was also part of the Dutch squad for the football tournament at the 1908 Summer Olympics, but he did not play in any matches.

== See also ==
- List of Dutch international footballers
