= Piet van der Wolk =

Dutch footballer

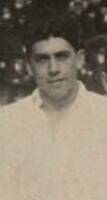
- Piet van der Wolk (1919)

Personal information
- Full name: Petrus Andreas van der Wolk
- Date of birth: 18 March 1892
- Place of birth: Rotterdam
- Date of death: 23 November 1952 (aged 60)

Senior career*
Years	Team	Apps	(Gls)
1908–1921	Sparta Rotterdam		

International career
1910–1919	Netherlands	6	(0)
- * Club domestic league appearances and goals

Piet van der Wolk (18 March 1892 – 23 November 1952) was a Dutch male footballer. He was part of the Netherlands national football team, playing 6 matches. He played his first match on 13 March 1910.

== See also ==
- List of Dutch international footballers
