= Eduard van Roessel =

Dutch footballer

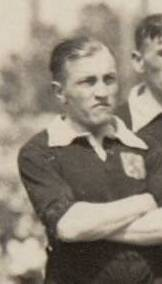
- Van Roessel in Genoa (international match, 1920)

Personal information
- Full name: Eduard Johannes Marie van Roessel
- Date of birth: 7 September 1897
- Place of birth: Breda, Netherlands
- Date of death: 26 January 1978 (aged 80)
- Place of death: Venlo, Netherlands
- Position: Midfielder

Senior career*
Years	Team	Apps	(Gls)
1913–1927	NAC		

International career
1920	Netherlands	2	(0)
- * Club domestic league appearances and goals

Eduard van Roessel (7 September 1897 – 26 January 1978) was a Dutch footballer who played primarily as a midfielder. He was nicknamed "de Knoest".

== Career ==
Van Roessel was born in Breda and began playing football for NAC in 1913. On 29 May 1921, he became national champion with NAC during the 1920–21 season.

He was the first NAC player to represent the Netherlands national team. Van Roessel earned two caps. He made his debut on 5 April 1920 in a match against Denmark, which the Netherlands won 2–0. His second international appearance was on 13 May 1920 against Italy (1–1). He retired from football in 1927.

Van Roessel died on 26 January 1978.

== International appearances ==
International matches of Eduard van Roessel for the Netherlands
No.	Date	Match	Result	Competition	Goals	Assists
As a player of NAC
1.	5 April 1920	Netherlands – Denmark	2 – 0	Friendly	0	0
2.	13 May 1920	Italy – Netherlands	1 – 1	Friendly	0	0

== Honours ==
Competition	Titles	Season(s)
Dutch Championship	1	1921

== See also ==
- List of Netherlands international footballers
