= Jan Schoemaker =

Dutch footballer

Personal information
- Full name: Jacobus Schoemaker
- Date of birth: 29 May 1882
- Place of birth: Loosduinen
- Date of death: 27 May 1954 (aged 71)

Senior career*
Years	Team	Apps	(Gls)
- HVV Den Haag

International career
1906	Netherlands	2	(0)
- * Club domestic league appearances and goals

Jan Schoemaker (29 May 1882 – 27 May 1954) was a Dutch footballer. He was part of the Netherlands national football team, playing 2 matches. He played his first match on 29 April 1906.

== See also ==
- List of Dutch international footballers
