= Kees Oldenburg =

Dutch footballer

Personal information
- Date of birth: 28 December 1900
- Place of birth: Rotterdam, Netherlands
- Date of death: 20 January 1954 (aged 53)

International career
Years	Team	Apps	(Gls)
1926	Netherlands	1	(0)

Kees Oldenburg (28 December 1900 – 20 January 1954) was a Dutch footballer. He played in one match for the Netherlands national football team in 1926.
