= Jo Schot =

Dutch footballer

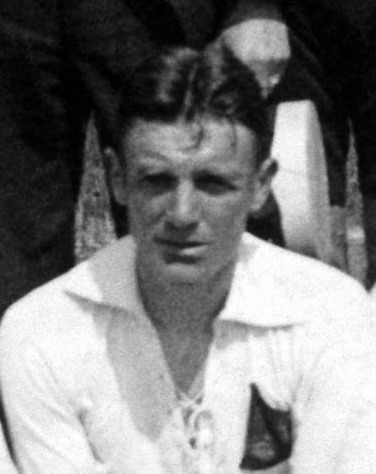

Personal information
- Date of birth: 22 January 1894
- Date of death: 19 July 1923 (aged 29)

International career
Years	Team	Apps	(Gls)
1922	Netherlands	1	(0)

Jo Schot (22 January 1894 – 19 July 1923) was a Dutch footballer. He played in one match for the Netherlands national football team in 1922.
