= Harry Kuneman =

Dutch footballer

Personal information
- Full name: Johan Herman Bernhard Kuneman
- Date of birth: 15 January 1886
- Place of birth: Purwakarta, Dutch East Indies
- Date of death: 7 September 1945 (aged 59)
- Place of death: Ambarawa, Dutch East Indies
- Position: Defender

Senior career*
Years	Team	Apps	(Gls)
	HBS Craeyenhout	54	(1)

International career
1908	Netherlands	1	(0)
- * Club domestic league appearances and goals

Johan Herman Bernhard Kuneman (15 January 1886 – 7 September 1945) was a Dutch governor in the Dutch East Indies and, in his youth, a footballer. He was part of the Netherlands national team, playing one match on 25 October 1908.

From 1933 to 1936 he was governor of East Java and served as a member of the Council of the Dutch East Indies at time he was taken prisoner of the occupying Japanese in World War II. He died in an Internment camp in Central Java, several weeks after the official surrender of the Japanese in the Dutch Indies. He was buried at Dutch War Cemetery Menteng Pulo, Jakarta.

== See also ==
- List of Dutch international footballers
