= Tonny van Haeren =

Dutch footballer

Personal information
- Full name: Antonius Christianus Maria van Haeren
- Date of birth: 23 September 1899
- Place of birth: 's-Hertogenbosch, Netherlands
- Date of death: 10 February 1970 (aged 70)
- Position: Leftback

Senior career*
Years	Team	Apps	(Gls)
1925–1927	Wilhelmina		

International career
1926	Netherlands	1	(0)
- * Club domestic league appearances and goals

Tonny van Haeren (23 September 1899 – 10 February 1970) was a Dutch footballer. He played in one match for the Netherlands national football team in 1926.

Van Haeren played for hometown club RKVV Wilhelmina. He has remained the club's sole international player. His profession was eye surgeon. He was married to Ducth tennis player Annie Kerckhoff.
