= Ben Hoogstede =

Dutch footballer (1888–1962)

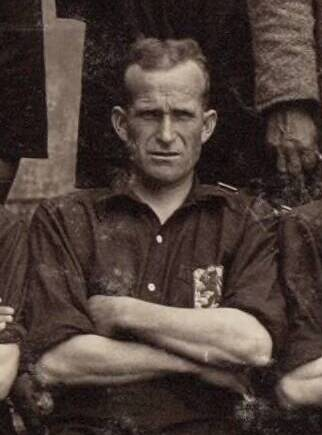
- Hoogstede (1921)

Personal information
- Full name: Bernardus Mathijs Hoogstede
- Date of birth: 16 March 1888
- Place of birth: Wageningen, Netherlands
- Date of death: 13 June 1962 (aged 74)
- Place of death: Eindhoven, Netherlands
- Position: Midfielder

Senior career*
Years	Team	Apps	(Gls)
1903-1911	Velox Wageningen		
- HVC
1912-1917	MSV		
1917-1923	NAC		
1923-1924	PSV		

International career
1921	Netherlands	4	(0)

Managerial career
- 1926–1927: PSV
- EVV Eindhoven
- Wilhelmina '08
- 1928-1929: De Valk
- 1936-1940: RKSV Rhode
- VV VOS
- * Club domestic league appearances and goals

Bernardus Mathijs Hoogstede (16 March 1888 – 13 June 1962) was a Dutch footballer who played as a midfielder for NAC Breda. He made four appearances for the Netherlands national team in 1921, making his debut aged 33.

Hoogstede joined NAC in 1917 from MSV Maastricht and scored at least 9 goals for the club in 97 games, playing during one of the most successful era's in the history of the club. He played one season for PSV and later became head coach at the Eindhoven club.
