= Sjo Soons =

Dutch footballer

Personal information
- Date of birth: 28 August 1898
- Date of death: 15 September 1964 (aged 66)

International career
Years	Team	Apps	(Gls)
1922	Netherlands	1	(0)

Sjo Soons (28 August 1898 – 15 September 1964) was a Dutch footballer. He played in one match for the Netherlands national football team in 1922.
