= Piet Lagarde =

Dutch footballer

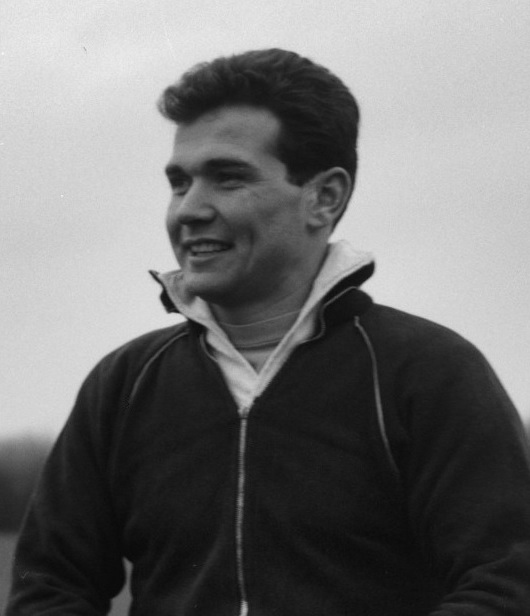
- Lagarde in 1961

Personal information
- Date of birth: 9 December 1939 (age 86)

International career
Years	Team	Apps	(Gls)
1962	Netherlands	2	(0)

Piet Lagarde (born 9 December 1939) is a Dutch footballer. He played in two matches for the Netherlands national football team in 1962.
