= Henk Vriens =

Dutch footballer (born 1943)

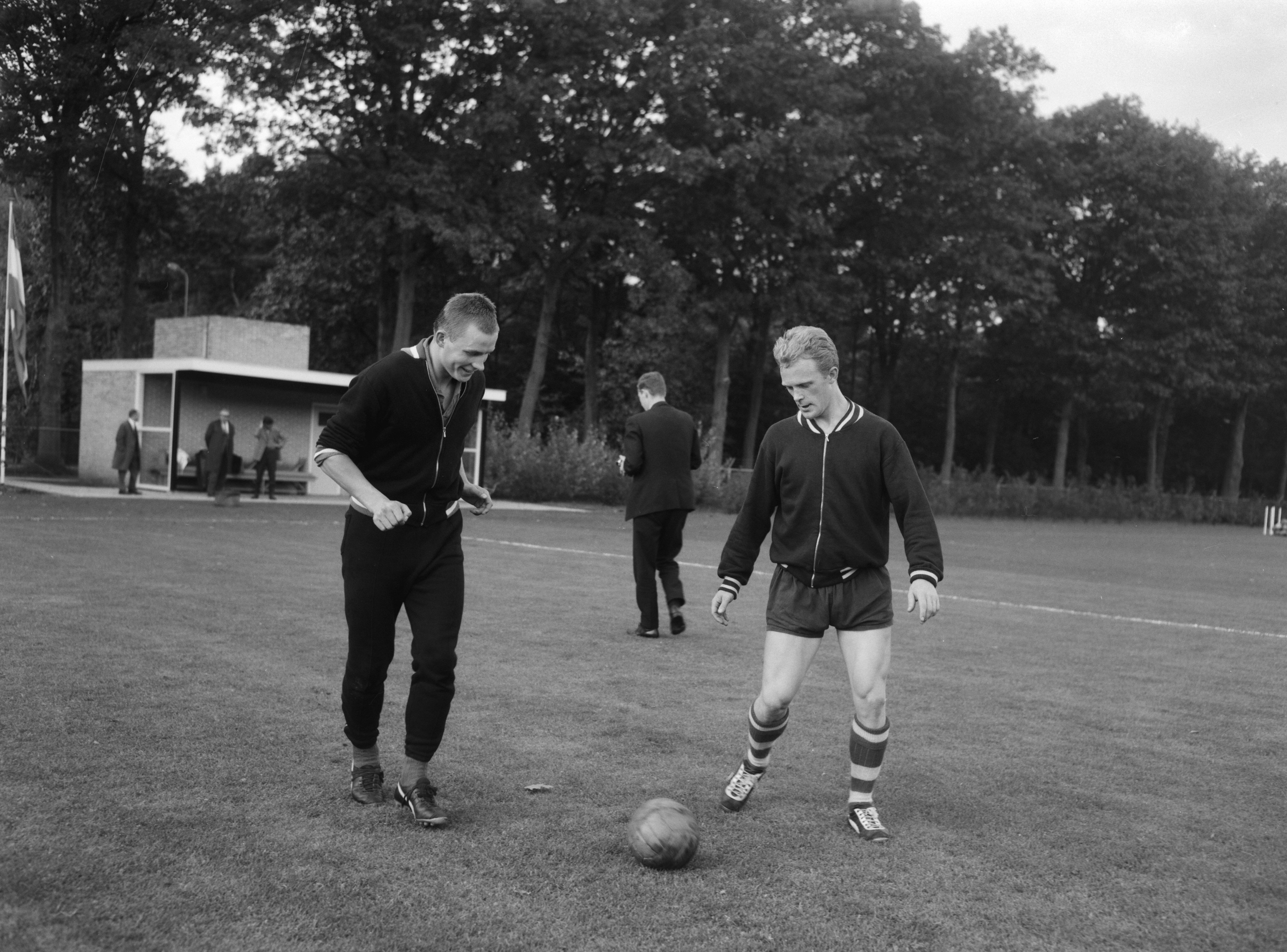
- Vriens and Henk Thijm in 1963

Personal information
- Full name: Hendrikus Lodevicus Adrianus Antonius Vriens
- Date of birth: 26 October 1943
- Place of birth: Tilburg, Netherlands
- Date of death: 22 May 2022 (aged 78)
- Position: Midfielder

Senior career*
Years	Team	Apps	(Gls)
1961–1969	Willem II		
1969–1970	NAC Breda	31	(0)
1970–1973	Willem II		

International career
1963	Netherlands	1	(0)
- * Club domestic league appearances and goals

Hendrikus Lodevicus Adrianus Antonius Vriens (26 October 1943 – 22 May 2022) was a Dutch footballer who played as a midfielder. He made one appearance for the Netherlands national team in 1963.

== Death ==
Vriens died on 22 May 2022, at the age of 78.
