= Harry Mommers =

Dutch footballer

Personal information
- Full name: Henricus Josephus Mommers
- Date of birth: 11 March 1892
- Place of birth: Tilburg, Netherlands
- Date of death: 28 February 1963 (aged 70)
- Position: Midfielder

Senior career*
Years	Team	Apps	(Gls)
1909–1925	Willem II		

International career
1920	Netherlands	1	(0)
- * Club domestic league appearances and goals

Henricus "Harry" Josephus Mommers (11 March 1892 – 28 February 1963) was a Dutch footballer.

== Career ==
Mommers played with Willem II from the age of 15. In the 1915-16 he was part of the team winning for the first time in hisotory of the club the National Championships. After being a player, he became mental coach for the club. By being able to quickly change the mental resilience of the team he was nicknamed "kleine Karel Lotsy" (translated: little Karel Lotsy)

He played in one match for the Netherlands national team in 1920. During this match he got injured and had to be substituted by Rat Verlegh.

Between 1910 and 1952 he served on various KNVB committees. Mommers was among others a member of the Technical Committee of the KNVB for the Dutch national team. He also contributed to a new board formation of Willem II.

he became an honorary member of Willem II. He became a knight of the KNVB in 1956.
