= Jaap Grobbe =

Dutch footballer (1897–1983)

Personal information
- Full name: Jacobus Albertus Grobbe
- Date of birth: 24 March 1897
- Place of birth: Amsterdam, Netherlands
- Date of death: 5 March 1983 (aged 85)
- Place of death: Amsterdam, Netherlands
- Position: Midfielder

Senior career*
| Years | Team | Apps | (Gls) |
| 1921-1923 | De Spartaan | | |

International career
| 1922 | Netherlands | 1 | (0) |
- * Club domestic league appearances and goals

Jaap Grobbe (24 March 1897 – 5 March 1983) was a Dutch footballer. He played in one match for the Netherlands national football team in 1922.

Grobbe worked as a metal turner and died in Amsterdam in 1983. He was decorated with the silver medal in the Order of Orange-Nassau.
