= Jo Jole =

Dutch footballer

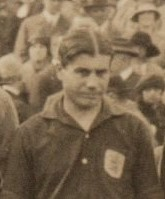
- Jole (1923)

Personal information
- Date of birth: 21 December 1890
- Date of death: 3 February 1953 (aged 62)

International career
Years	Team	Apps	(Gls)
1923	Netherlands	2	(0)

Jo Jole (21 December 1890 – 3 February 1953) was a Dutch footballer. He played in two matches for the Netherlands national football team in 1923.
