= Arnold Hörburger =

Dutch footballer

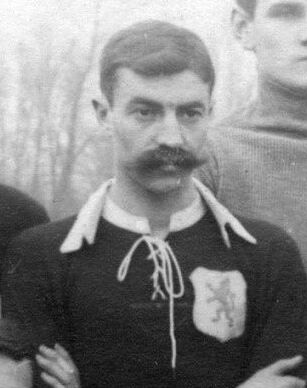

Personal information
- Full name: Arnold Hörburger
- Date of birth: February 17, 1886
- Place of birth: Rotterdam, Netherlands
- Date of death: February 20, 1966 (aged 80)
- Place of death: Rotterdam, Netherlands
- Position: Left midfielder

Senior career*
Years	Team	Apps	(Gls)
1904-1905	Quick		
1905-1923	VOC		
1923-1924	Quick		
1924-1926	Unitas		

International career
1910-1912	Netherlands	8	(0)
- * Club domestic league appearances and goals

Arnold Hörburger (February 17, 1886, Rotterdam – February 20, 1966) was a Dutch amateur football) player.

== Club career ==
Alongside his twin brother Anton, Hörburger played for Quick and VOC.

== International career ==
Hörburger played 8 games for the Netherlands between 1910 and 1912.

He was a part of the Dutch Olympic team, which won the bronze medal in the 1912 tournament. Due to being a reserve player, he did not play in a match and was not awarded with a medal.

During a game against Belgium, Arnold left the pitch injured after half an hour. To everyone's surprise he came back on fresh in the second half, the Belgian opponents suspecting Arnold's twin brother Anton had taken his place.
