= Piet Stevens =

Dutch footballer

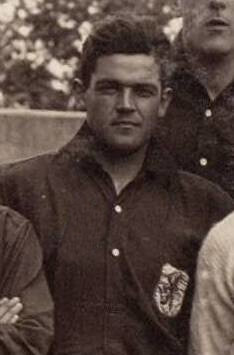
- Stevens (1921)

Personal information
- Date of birth: 13 December 1897
- Place of birth: Tilburg, Netherlands
- Date of death: 26 October 1970 (aged 72)

International career
Years	Team	Apps	(Gls)
1921	Netherlands	5	(0)

Piet Stevens (13 December 1897 – 26 October 1970) was a Dutch footballer. He played in three matches for the Netherlands national football team in 1921.
