= Guus de Seriere =

Dutch footballer

Gus de Seriere
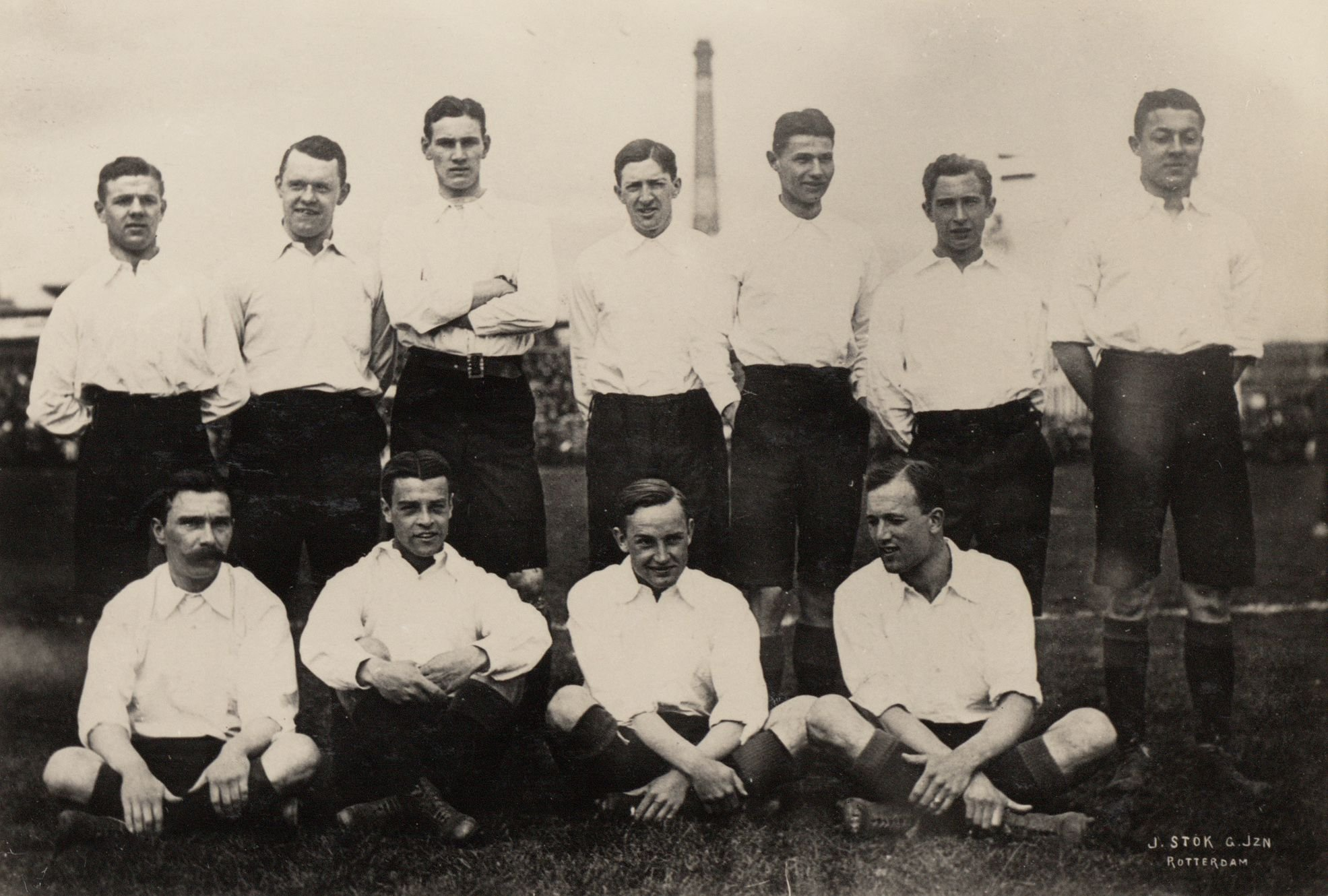
- Gus de Serière & the Dutch squad (1912)

Personal information
- Date of birth: 5 March 1893
- Place of birth: Kraksaan, Probolinggo, East Java
- Date of death: 29 December 1980 (aged 87)
- Place of death: The Hague

Senior career*
Years	Team	Apps	(Gls)
- HVV Den Haag

International career
1911	Netherlands	2	(0)
- * Club domestic league appearances and goals

Gus de Seriere (5 March 1893 – 30 December 1980) was a Dutch male footballer. He was part of the Netherlands national football team, playing 2 matches. He played his first match on 2 April 1911.

== See also ==
- List of Dutch international footballers
