= Herman van Diermen =

Dutch footballer (1895–1946)

Manus van Diermen
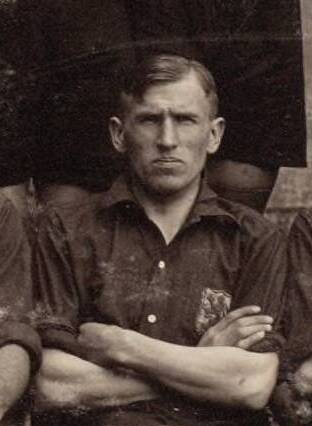
- Van Diermen in 1921

Personal information
- Full name: Hermanus van Diermen
- Date of birth: 26 September 1895
- Place of birth: Baarn, Netherlands
- Date of death: 14 October 1946 (aged 51)
- Place of death: Baarn, Netherlands
- Position: Inside left

Senior career*
Years	Team	Apps	(Gls)
- VV Baarn
1918-1923	Blauw-Wit	128	

International career
1920–1921	Netherlands	5	(0)
- * Club domestic league appearances and goals

Hermanus "Manus" van Diermen (26 September 1895 – 14 October 1946) was a Dutch footballer who played as an inside left.

He played with VV Baarn, Blauw-Wit Amsterdam and the Netherlands national team. His nickname was "Het Kanon" ('the cannon').

== Biography ==
Van Diermen was born in 1895 as the son of Gerardus van Diermen and Geertruida van Rouwendaal. He married Johanna Maria Dijs.

Van Diermen became the first ever international footballer for Blauw-Wit in 1920. He made this debut on 5 April 1920 in Amsterdam against Denmark in the match that was won. He had good technical movements, a very good overview and especially great left sided shots. In total, he played five matches for the national team between 1920 and 1921.

In September 1920 it was announced he would possibly move from Blauw-Wit to De Spartaan, but as of December 1922 he still played with Blauw-Wit. A knee injury plagued him and in 1923 he had to retire as a football player. Van Diermen played a total of 128 matches with Blauw-Wit. He received numerous offers to become a trainer and signed a contract with B.V.C. (Bussum).

On 14 October 1946, Van Diermen died at the age of 51 in Baarn. In the Algemeen Dagblad newspaper of 15 October 1946, he was mentioned as a “by chance forgotten footballer”. On 18 October 1946 he was buried at the de Nieuwe Algemene Begraafplaats in Baarn. The financial situation of his family was so bad that on 31 October 1946, the Het Volk newspaper appealed to help them. Ultimately, a "Fonds Van Diermen" ('Van Diermen relief fund') was founded.

In 1948 the "Van Diermen veteran tournament" was held in memory of him.
