= Hans Blume =

Dutch footballer

Personal information
- Full name: Henri Johan Blume
- Date of birth: 16 November 1887
- Place of birth: Semarang, Dutch East Indies
- Date of death: 5 January 1978 (aged 90)
- Place of death: Galston, New South Wales, Australia
- Position: Forward

Senior career*
Years	Team	Apps	(Gls)
1905-1908	Quick 1888		

International career
1907	Netherlands	1	(1)
- * Club domestic league appearances and goals

Hans Blume (16 November 1887 – 5 January 1978) was a Dutch footballer who played as a forward.

== International career ==
Blume made his debut and played his sole game for the Netherlands on 1 April 1907 against England, immediately scoring a goal.

== Personal life ==
Born near Semarang, Dutch East Indies, Blume emigrated to Thailand in the 1930s and later to Australia. He died in 1978 in a town near Sydney.

== See also ==
- List of Dutch international footballers

== Sources ==
- Verkamman, Van der Steen, Volkers (1999) De Internationals, de historie van Oranje. Amsterdam, Weekbladpers BV/Voetbal International.
