= Herman van Loon =

Dutch footballer

Personal information
- Date of birth: 19 January 1910
- Date of death: 4 December 1981 (aged 71)

International career
Years	Team	Apps	(Gls)
1929	Netherlands	1	(0)

Herman van Loon (19 January 1910 – 4 December 1981) was a Dutch footballer. He played in one match for the Netherlands national football team in 1929.
