= Harry Brüll =

Dutch footballer (1935–2021)

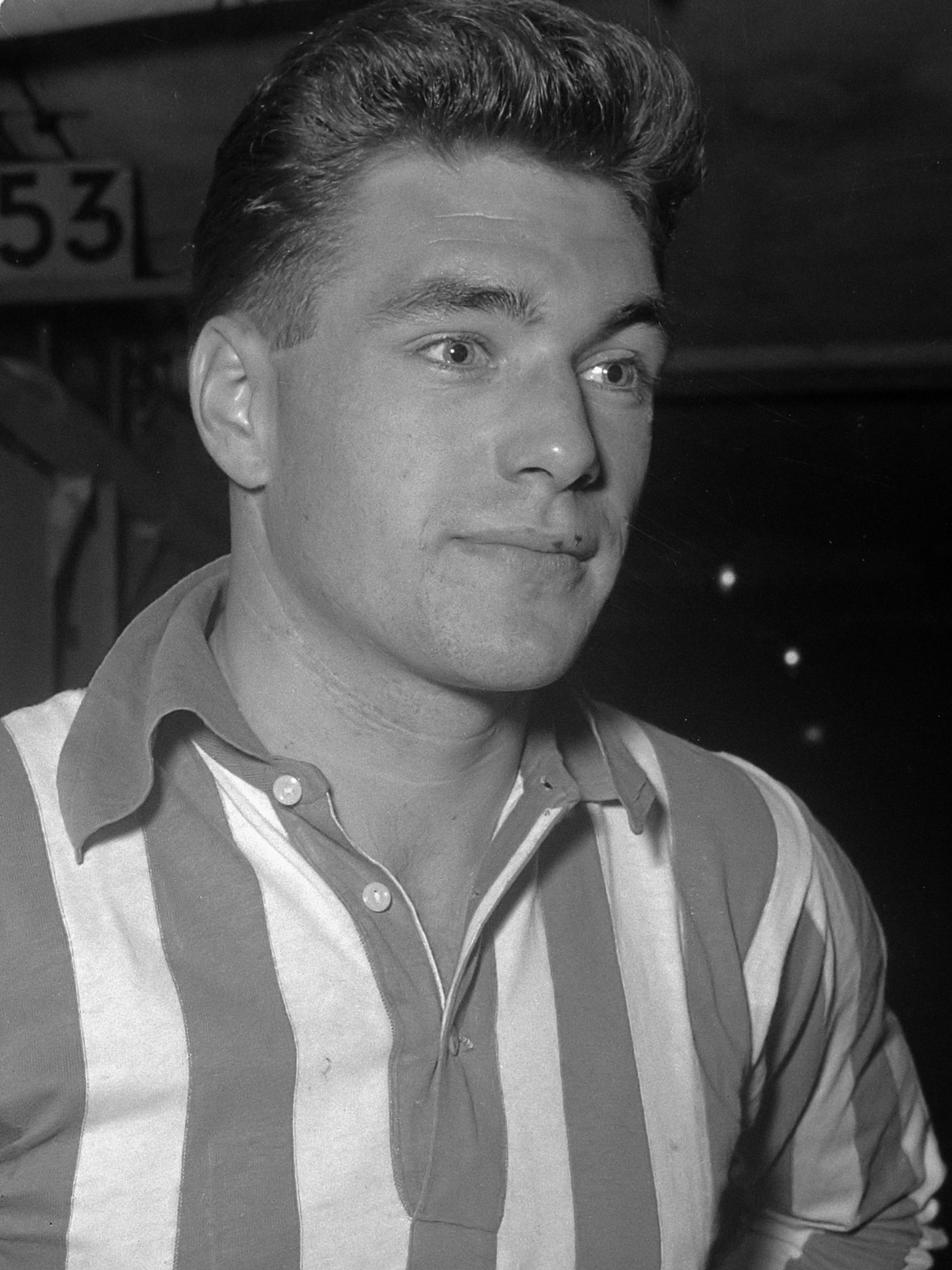

Personal information
- Full name: Harry Rosie Marie Brüll
- Date of birth: 12 April 1935
- Place of birth: Sittard, Netherlands
- Date of death: 9 January 2021 (aged 85)
- Place of death: Sittard, Netherlands
- Position: Defender

Youth career
- Sittardse Boys

Senior career*
Years	Team	Apps	(Gls)
1956–1957	Sittardia	30	(1)
1957–1961	Rapid JC	135	(1)
1961–1963	MVV	63	(3)
1963–1966	Fortuna '54	86	(1)
1966–1968	Sittardia	94	(1)
1968–1969	Fortuna Sittard	1	(0)
Total		379	(6)

International career
1959	Netherlands	2	(0)
- * Club domestic league appearances and goals

Harry Brüll (12 April 1935 – 9 January 2021) was a Dutch footballer. He played in two matches for the Netherlands national football team in 1959. He played his entire career in his native Limburg.

Brüll passed away in January 2021, aged 85. A minute silence was held in his honour before Fortuna's match against Sparta four days later.
