= Miel van Leijden =

Dutch footballer

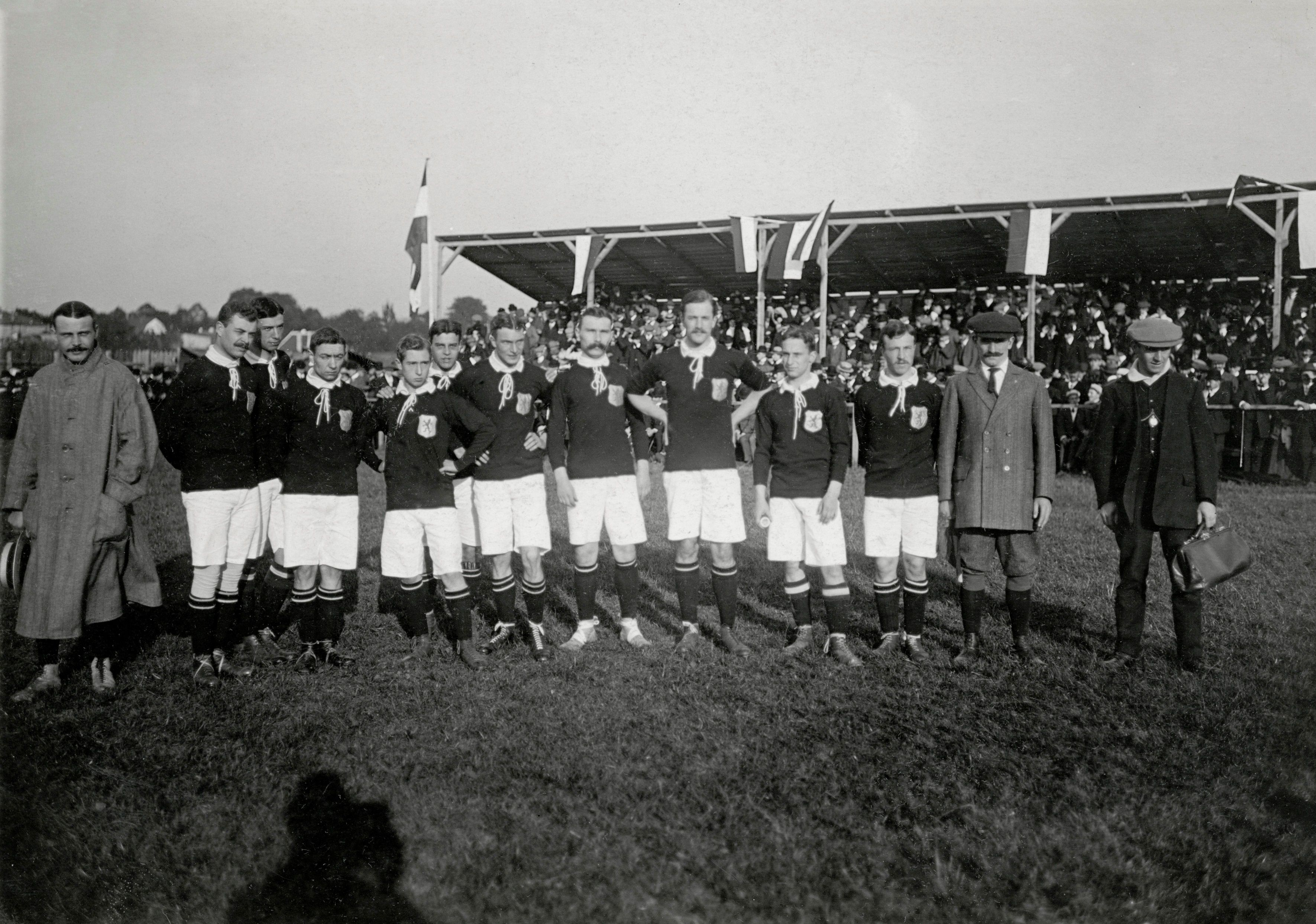
- Miel van Leijden w. Dutch squad (1910)

Personal information
- Full name: Emile Victor van Leijden
- Date of birth: 20 December 1885
- Place of birth: Batavia, Dutch East Indies
- Date of death: 4 June 1949 (aged 63)

Senior career*
Years	Team	Apps	(Gls)
- HVV Den Haag

International career
1910	Netherlands	1	(0)
- * Club domestic league appearances and goals

Miel van Leijden (1885–1949) was a Dutch male footballer. He was part of the Netherlands national football team, playing 1 match on 16 October 1910.

== See also ==
- List of Dutch international footballers
