= Jan Akkersdijk =

Dutch footballer (1887–1953)

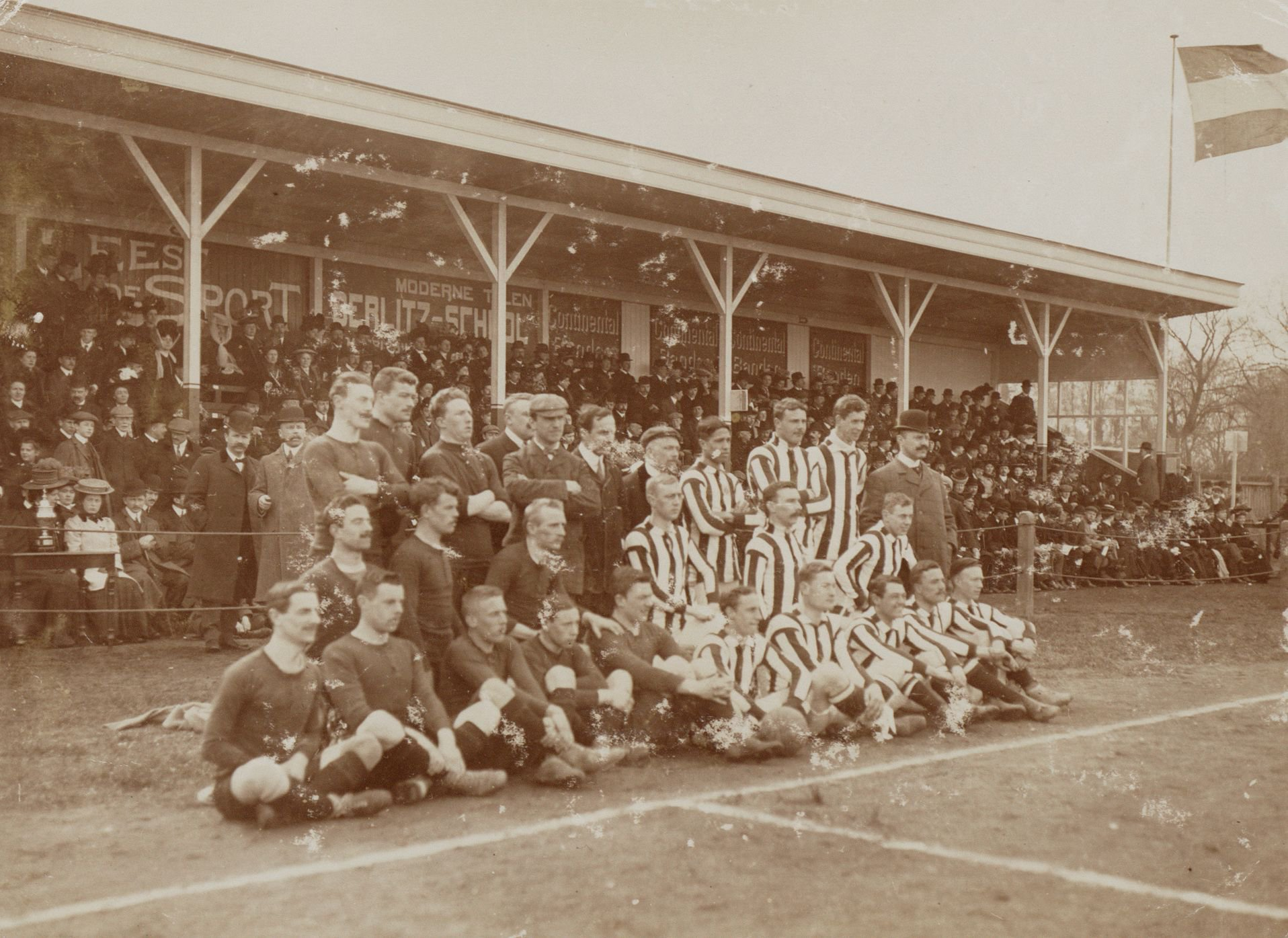
- Nederlands elftal en Belgisch elftal poserend voor de interland Nederland-België. Nederlands elftal, staand van links naar rechts: Karel Heijting, Reinier Beeuwkes, Louis Otten en Hirschmann (NVB, met bolhoed). Zittend, middelste rij: Kees Bekker, Bok de Korver en Noud Stempels. Zittend, voorste rij: Caius Welcker, Edu Snethlage, Jan Akkersdijk, Jan Thomée en Herman Jurgens. Nederland - België (3-1), gespeeld op 26 april 1908 op het Sparta-terrein te Rotterdam. Opstelling: Reinier Beeuwkes (DFC), Karel Heijting (HVV, aanvoerder), Louis Otten (Quick den Haag), Kees Bekker (HBS), Bok de Korver (Sparta), Noud Stempels (Quick den Haag), Caius Welcker (Quick den Haag), Edu Snethlage (Quick den Haag), Jan Akkersdijk (Velocitas Breda), Jan Thomée (Concordia) en Herman Jurgens (Sparta). Voor België speelden: Henri Leroy, Roger Piérard, Edgard Poelmans, Guillaume Van den Eynde, Charles Cambier, Camille van Hoorden, Maurice Tobias, Jules Suetens, Robert de Veen, Louis Saeys, Georges Hebdin, Georges Mathot.

Personal information
- Full name: Jan Jacobus Akkersdijk
- Date of birth: 8 January 1887
- Place of birth: Ngrantjak near Ambarawa, Dutch East Indies
- Date of death: 31 March 1953 (aged 66)
- Position: Forward

Senior career*
Years	Team	Apps	(Gls)
- CVV Velocitas

International career
1908	Netherlands	2	(1)
- * Club domestic league appearances and goals

Jan Akkersdijk (8 January 1887 – 31 March 1953) was a Dutch footballer.

== Career ==
Akkersdijk played his club football for Velocitas in Breda.

He made his debut for the Netherlands in an April 1908 friendly match against Belgium and earned a total of 2 caps, scoring one goal which he scored in his final international against France. He was also part of the Dutch squad for the football tournament at the 1908 Summer Olympics, but he did not play in any matches.

=== International goals ===
Scores and results list. Netherlands' goal tally first.

#	Date	Venue	Opponent	Score	Result	Competition
1.	10 May 1908	Stadion Prinsenlaan, Rotterdam, Netherlands	France	3–0	4–1	Friendly match

== See also ==
- List of Dutch international footballers
