= Jos van Son =

Dutch footballer

Personal information
- Date of birth: 31 May 1893
- Date of death: 14 July 1956 (aged 63)

International career
Years	Team	Apps	(Gls)
1923	Netherlands	1	(0)

Jos van Son (31 May 1893 – 14 July 1956) was a Dutch footballer. He played in one match for the Netherlands national football team in 1923.
