= Klaas Lugthart =

Dutch footballer

Personal information
- Date of birth: 18 April 1928
- Date of death: 9 February 2015 (aged 86)

International career
Years	Team	Apps	(Gls)
1952	Netherlands	2	(0)

Klaas Lugthart (18 April 1928 – 9 February 2015) was a Dutch footballer. He played in two matches for the Netherlands national football team in 1952.
