= Gerrit Voges =

Dutch footballer (1932–2007)

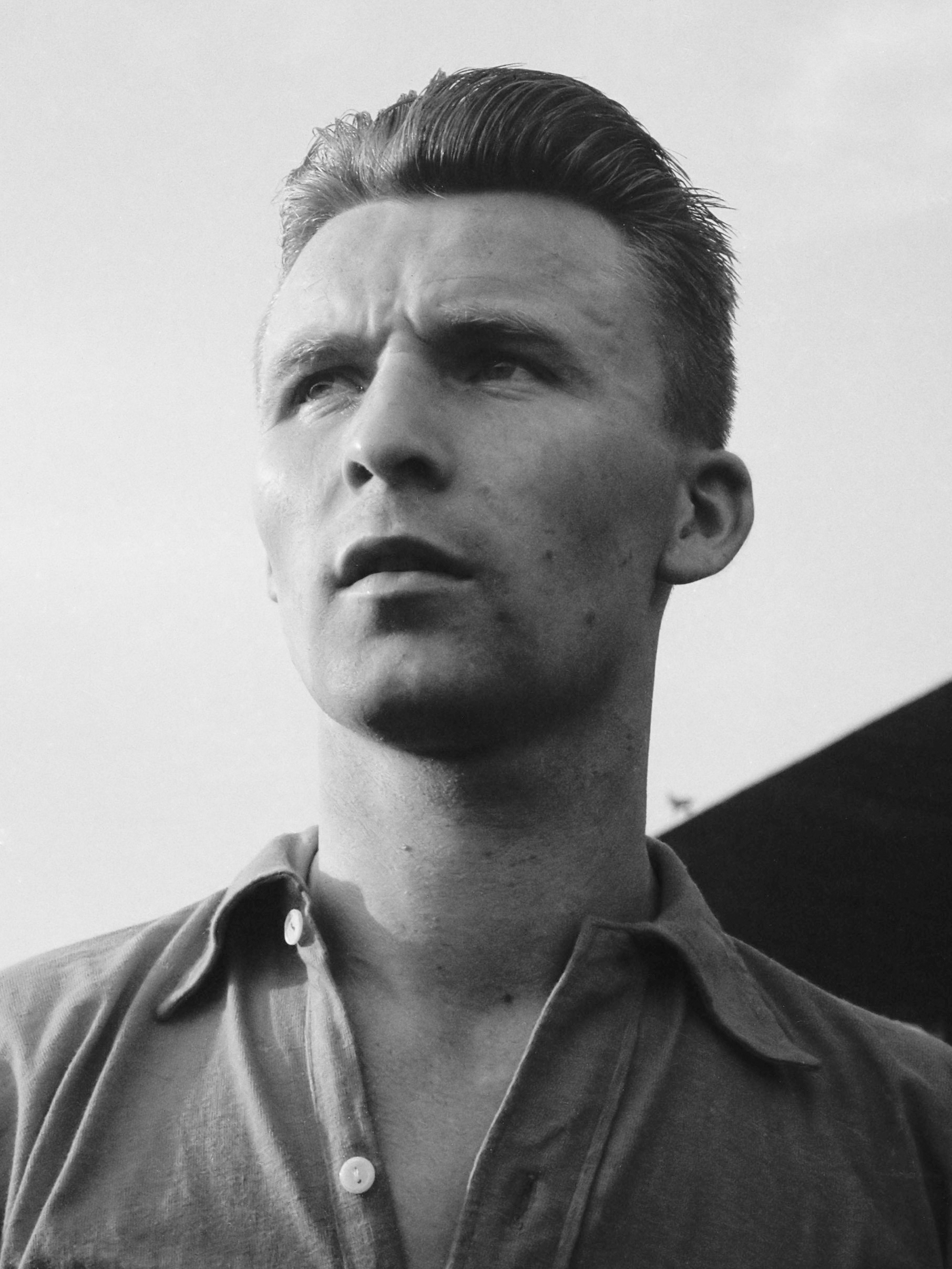
- Voges in 1956

Personal information
- Date of birth: 11 July 1932
- Place of birth: Zwolle, Netherlands
- Date of death: 21 June 2007 (aged 74)
- Place of death: Zwolle, Netherlands
- Position: Forward

Senior career*
Years	Team	Apps	(Gls)
1949–1954	PEC Zwolle		
1954–1959	SC Enschede		
1959–1960	DOS Utrecht		
1960–1961	SC Enschede		
1961–1962	Willem II Tilburg		
1962–1966	PEC Zwolle		

International career
1956	Netherlands	2	(0)
- * Club domestic league appearances and goals

Gerrit Voges (11 July 1932 – 21 June 2007) was a Dutch footballer who played as a forward. He made two matches for the Netherlands national team in 1956.
