= Gerrit Nagels =

Dutch footballer (1906–1950)

Personal information
- Date of birth: 7 April 1906
- Place of birth: Enschede, Netherlands
- Date of death: 26 February 1950 (aged 43)
- Position: Midfielder

International career
Years	Team	Apps	(Gls)
1928–1933	Netherlands	3	(0)

Gerrit Nagels (7 April 1906 – 26 February 1950) was a Dutch footballer who played as a midfielder. He played in three matches for the Netherlands national football team from 1928 to 1933.
