= Dolf van der Nagel =

Dutch footballer

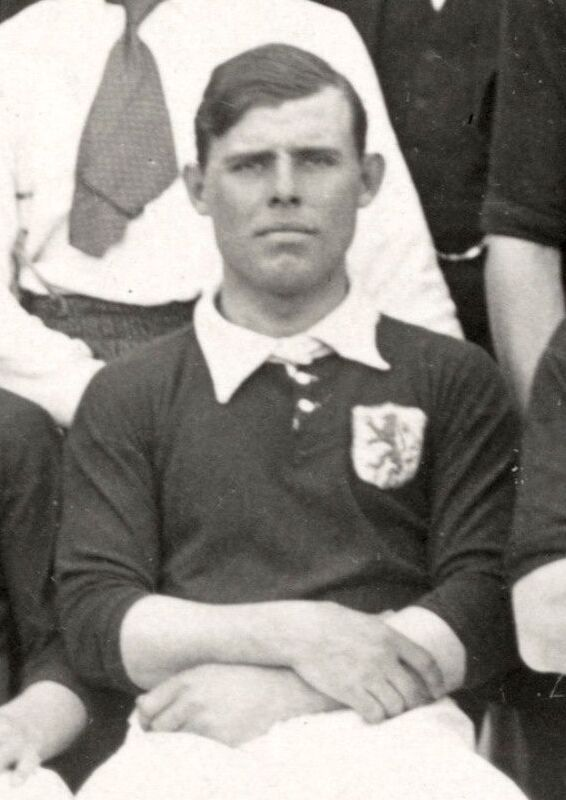
Dolf van der Nagel (1914)

Rudolf Cornelis "Dolf" van der Nagel (28 May 1889 in Buitenzorg, Dutch East Indies – 10 October 1949) was a Dutch amateur football (soccer) player.

He was a part of the Dutch Olympic team which won the bronze medal in the 1912 tournament. Due to being a reserve player, he did not play in any of the matches and was not awarded a medal. He made one appearance for the Netherlands national team in 1914. He was a soldier by profession and in 1918 married Campegina Vitringa in Harderwijk.
