= Jo Eshuijs =

Dutch footballer

Personal information
- Full name: Johannes Theodorus Hendrikus Jacobus Eshuijs
- Date of birth: 6 February 1885
- Place of birth: Tandjong Balei, Dutch East Indies
- Date of death: 24 November 1979 (aged 94)
- Place of death: Rotterdam, Netherlands

Senior career*
Years	Team	Apps	(Gls)
1905–1909	Sparta		

International career
1906	Netherlands	1	(0)
- * Club domestic league appearances and goals

Johannes Theodorus Hendrikus Jacobus "Jo" Eshuijs (6 February 1885 – 24 November 1979) was a Dutch international footballer who earned one cap for the national side in 1906.

== Club career ==
Eshuijs played club football for Sparta Rotterdam.

== International career ==
He played his only international match on 13 May 1906 against Belgium.
