= Rens Vis =

Dutch footballer

Personal information
- Date of birth: 4 July 1904
- Place of birth: Netherlands
- Date of death: 8 March 1993 (aged 88)

Senior career*
Years	Team	Apps	(Gls)
	HVV	?	(?)

International career
1926–1928	Netherlands	1	(0)
- * Club domestic league appearances and goals

Rens Vis (4 July 1904 – 8 March 1993) was a Dutch footballer. He played in one match for the Netherlands national football team in 1926.

== Biography ==
Vis played football for HVV and gained one cap for the Netherlands national team on 31 October 1926, in the 3–2 friendly loss against Germany. He was also part of the squad for the 1928 Summer Olympics but did not play. Vis also played cricket at HVV.

In 1930, Vis moved to the Dutch East Indies. In February 1949, while acting as administrator of the company Pasawahan in the Banjar Region, he was kidnapped together with his staff by the Indonesian National Armed Forces.
