= Marius Sandberg =

Dutch footballer

Personal information
- Date of birth: 5 September 1896
- Date of death: 19 March 1986 (aged 89)

International career
Years	Team	Apps	(Gls)
1926	Netherlands	2	(0)

Marius Sandberg (5 September 1896 – 19 March 1986) was a Dutch footballer. He played in two matches for the Netherlands national football team in 1926.
