= Lo La Chapelle =

Dutch footballer

Personal information
- Full name: Eloi Hubert La Chapelle
- Date of birth: 22 June 1888
- Place of birth: Buitenzorg, Dutch East Indies
- Date of death: 23 July 1966 (aged 78)
- Place of death: Utrecht, Netherlands
- Position: Goalkeeper

Senior career*
Years	Team	Apps	(Gls)
- HVV Den Haag

International career
1907	Netherlands	1	(0)
- * Club domestic league appearances and goals

Medal record

Men's football

Representing Netherlands

Olympic Games
Bronze medal – third place	1908 London	Team competition

Eloi Hubert "Lo" La Chapelle (22 June 1888 – 23 July 1966) was a Dutch footballer who played as a goalkeeper for amateur side HVV Den Haag. He also earned one cap for the Dutch national side in 1907, and participated at the 1908 Summer Olympics, winning a bronze medal.

== Biography ==
On 21 December 1907, the tall goalkeeper of the then reigning champions HVV from Den Haag earned his first cap for the Dutch national side in a friendly match against England amateurs at Darlington, as a last-minute substitution for first-choice goalkeeper Reinier Beeuwkes. La Chapelle conceded a resounding 12 goals on his international debut in a 2–12 defeat, which still is the heaviest loss in the history of the Netherlands national team, making La Chapelle the goalkeeper who has conceded the most goals in a single Dutch international and also the one with the biggest average of goals conceded per game since he never earned any other cap. The following year, he was part of the Dutch squad that contested the football tournament of the 1908 Olympics in London where the team won the bronze medal. However, he was not awarded a bronze medal due to have not played.
