= Terus Küchlin =

Dutch footballer (1906–1981)

Personal information
- Full name: Sander Wolterus Küchlin
- Date of birth: 13 September 1906
- Place of birth: Malang, Dutch East Indies
- Date of death: 20 October 1981 (aged 75)
- Position: Forward

Senior career*
Years	Team	Apps	(Gls)
1924–1929	HBS Craeyenhout	92	(53)

International career
1925–1926	Netherlands	3	(1)
- * Club domestic league appearances and goals

Sander Wolterus "Terus" Küchlin (13 September 1906 – 20 October 1981) was a Dutch footballer who played as a forward. He made three appearances for the Netherlands national team from 1925 to 1926.
