= Albert Snouck Hurgronje =

Dutch footballer (1903–1967)

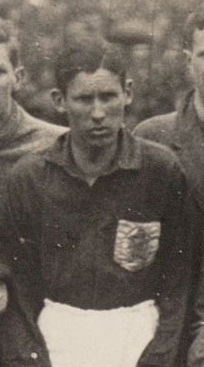
- Snouck Hurgronje (1924)

Personal information
- Full name: Albert Willem Snouck Hurgronje
- Date of birth: 30 May 1903
- Place of birth: Bondowoso, Dutch East Indies
- Date of death: 28 June 1967 (aged 64)
- Place of death: The Hague, Netherlands
- Position: Outside right

Senior career*
| Years | Team | Apps | (Gls) |
| 1920–1932 | HVV | 224 | (7) |

International career
| 1924–1925 | Netherlands | 6 | (1) |
- * Club domestic league appearances and goals

Albert Willem Snouck Hurgronje (30 May 1903 – 28 June 1967) was a Dutch footballer. He competed in the men's tournament at the 1924 Summer Olympics.

Snouck Hurgronje made six appearances for the Netherlands, succeeding Ber Groosjohan on the right wing and in which he managed to score one goal.

At club level, he played for HVV in The Hague, where he made 224 total appearances and seven goals.
