= Henk Wamsteker (footballer) =

Dutch footballer

Personal information
- Date of birth: 1 May 1900
- Date of death: 12 July 1959 (aged 59)

International career
Years	Team	Apps	(Gls)
1925–1929	Netherlands	2	(0)

Henk Wamsteker (1 May 1900 – 12 July 1959) was a Dutch footballer. He played in two matches for the Netherlands national football team from 1925 to 1929.
