= Jan Kok (footballer) =

Dutch footballer

Olympic medal record

Men's Football
| Bronze medal – third place | 1908 London | Team Competition |

Johan "Jan" Adolph Frederik Kok (July 9, 1889 in Soerabaja, Dutch East Indies – December 2, 1958 in Zeist) was a Dutch football (soccer) player who competed in the 1908 Summer Olympics as a member of the Dutch team, which won the bronze medal in the football tournament.
