= Hans van Kesteren =

Dutch footballer

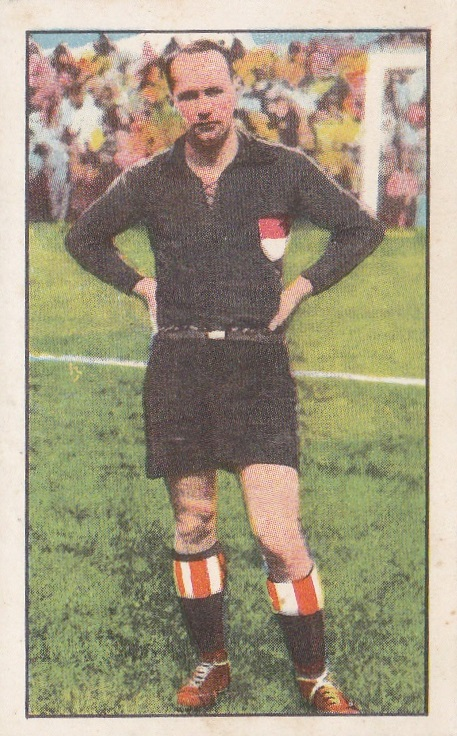
- Hans van Kesteren, 1931

Personal information
- Date of birth: 21 February 1908
- Date of death: 21 July 1998 (aged 90)

International career
Years	Team	Apps	(Gls)
1929	Netherlands	1	(0)

Hans van Kesteren (21 February 1908 – 21 July 1998) was a Dutch footballer. He played in one match for the Netherlands national football team in 1929.
