= Vic Gonsalves =

Dutch footballer

Personal information
- Full name: Victor Albert Gonsalves
- Date of birth: 20 October 1887
- Place of birth: Cheribon, Dutch East Indies
- Date of death: 29 August 1922 (aged 34)
- Place of death: Amsterdam, Netherlands
- Position: Midfielder

Senior career*
Years	Team	Apps	(Gls)
1906–1923	HBS Craeyenhout	86	

International career
1909-1910	Netherlands	3	(0)
- * Club domestic league appearances and goals

Victor Albert "Vic" Gonsalves (20 October 1887, Cheribon – 29 August 1922, Amsterdam) was a Dutch amateur association football player. Between 1906 and 1923 he played 86 matches for HBS Craeyenhout. He was nicknamed "de Prins" (the Prince) and known as a midfielder with a decent pass.

He made his debut for the Netherlands in 1909 away to Belgium, which the Dutch won 1–4. A month later he received his second cap in a 4–0 home loss against England. His third and final cap was a 3–2 defeat against Belgium in 1910. Gonsalves was a part of the Dutch Olympic team which won the bronze medal in the 1908 tournament; however, since he was a reserve player and did not play in a match, he was not given a medal.

He suffered with health problems and died at the age of 34.
