= Ge Fortgens =

Dutch footballer (1887–1957)

Gé Fortgens
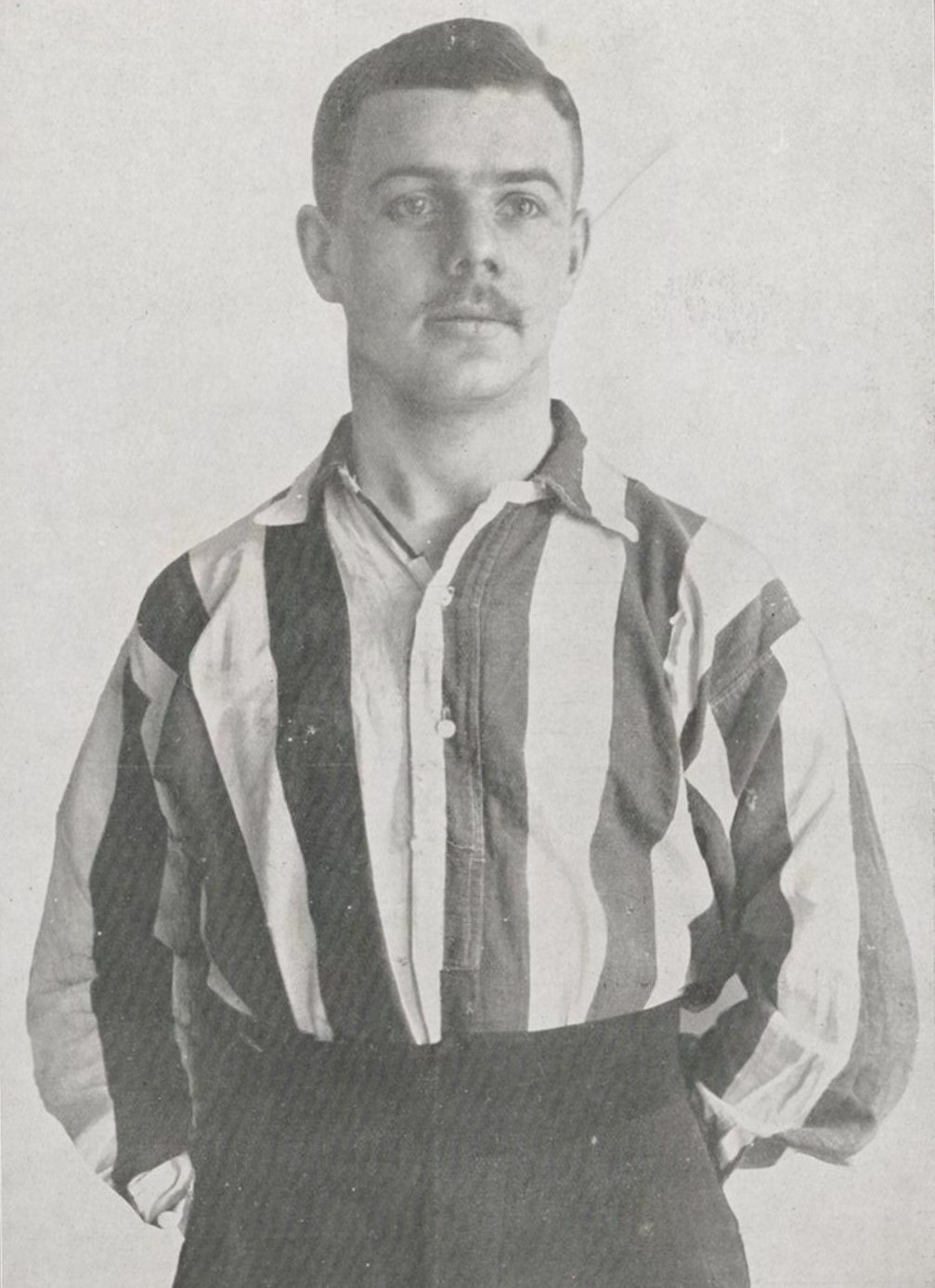
- Gé Fortgens in 1911

Personal information
- Full name: Gerardus Fortgens
- Date of birth: July 10, 1887
- Place of birth: Haarlem, Netherlands
- Date of death: May 4, 1957 (aged 69)
- Place of death: Haarlem, Netherlands
- Positions: Defender; midfielder

Senior career*
Years	Team	Apps	(Gls)
1906–1914	Ajax	52	(0)
1914–1917	UVV		
1917–1922	Haarlem		

International career
1911–1912	Netherlands	8	(0)
Medal record
Men's football
Representing Netherlands
Olympic Games
Bronze medal – third place	1912 Stockholm	Team competition
- * Club domestic league appearances and goals

Gerardus "Gé" Fortgens (July 10, 1887, in Haarlem – May 4, 1957, in Haarlem) was a Dutch amateur football player. Fortgens was the first Ajax-player ever who was selected for the Netherlands national football team for the 1912 Summer Olympics and won the bronze medal.
