= Guus van Hecking Colenbrander =

Dutch footballer (1887–1945)

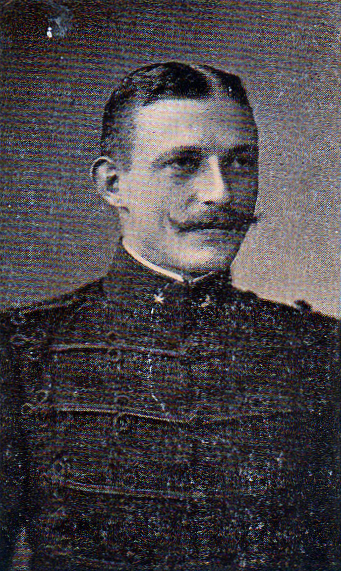

Personal information
- Full name: Gustaaf Paul van Hecking Colenbrander
- Date of birth: November 7, 1887
- Place of birth: Soerabaja, Dutch East Indies
- Date of death: March 13, 1945 (aged 57)
- Place of death: Zeist, Netherlands
- Position: Defender

Senior career*
Years	Team	Apps	(Gls)
1907-1909	CVV Velocitas		

International career
1908	Netherlands	1	(0)
- * Club domestic league appearances and goals

Guus van Hecking Colenbrander (7 November 1887 in Surabaya – 13 March 1945 in Zeist) was a Dutch football player. He represented the Netherlands national football team in 1908 and played club football for Velocitas Breda.

== Early life ==
Van Hecking Colenbrander was born on 7 November 1887 in Surabaya in the Dutch East Indies (now Indonesia).

== Career ==
Van Hecking Colenbrander came from a military family and he became a major in the air force; hence he played club football in the Netherlands for Velocitas Breda, a team associated with military and cadet institutions in the early 20th century.

He earned one cap for the Netherlands national team in 1908, appearing in an international match during the early years of organized international football.

== Death ==
Van Hecking Colenbrander died on 13 March 1945 in Zeist, Netherlands, at the age of 57, reportedly due to consequences of prolonged captivity as prisoners of war in the Dutch East Indies.
