= Piet van Reenen =

Dutch footballer

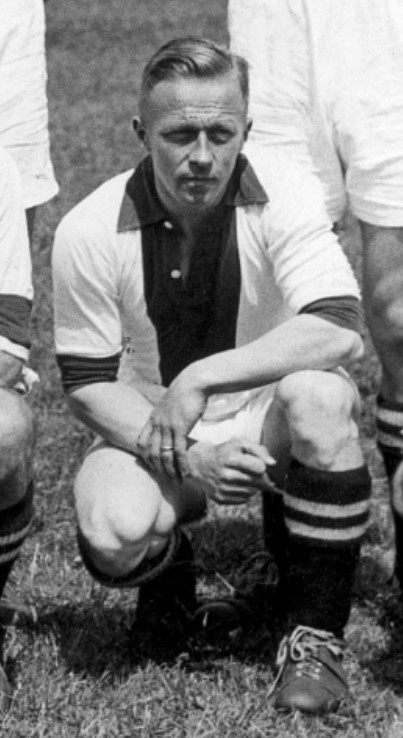
- Piet van Reenen in 1939

Personal information
- Full name: Petrus van Reenen
- Date of birth: 17 January 1909
- Place of birth: Utrecht, Netherlands
- Date of death: 8 June 1969 (aged 60)
- Place of death: Utrecht, Netherlands
- Position: Forward

Senior career*
Years	Team	Apps	(Gls)
1926–1929	UVV	37	(30)
1929–1943	Ajax	177	(214)
Total		214	(244)

International career
1930–1933	Netherlands	2	(0)
- * Club domestic league appearances and goals

Piet van Reenen (17 January 1909 – 8 June 1969) was a Dutch former professional footballer who was a prolific goalscorer at Ajax. With 278 goals in 240 matches from 1929 to 1943, he is the club's all-time top goal scorer. He was also the club's top goal scorer for 9 consecutive seasons, from 1929–30 to 1937–38.

== Career ==
Van Reenen began his football career at UVV Utrecht, where he made 30 goals in 37 games. His debut for UVV took place on October 3, 1926 when he was 17 years old in the second game of the season in the away game against FC Hilversum was incident in the second half for center forward Kan. The rest of the season he played all games. His first goals Van Reenen scored on 17 October 1926. In the away match won 2-0 against V.O.C.s He made two goals. His goal after 22 minutes was the first of an endless series. Only sixteen years later he made his 303rd and his final goal in his career as a footballer.

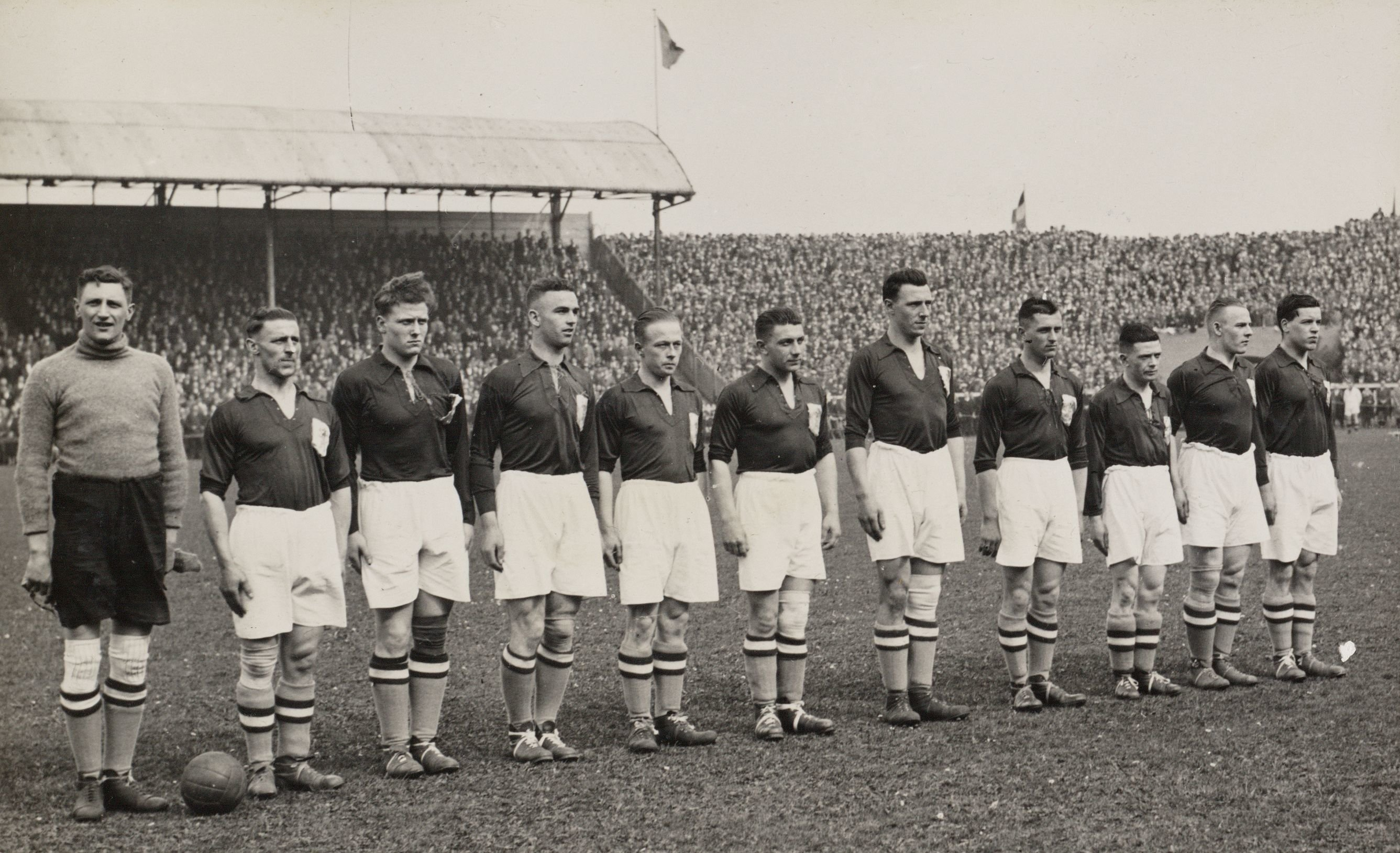

Van Reenen is the first Dutch player who broke the 300 league goals border at the highest level. In his second season, Van Reenen was like many young players with a check. He was drafted but seven times and made just one goal. The first four games he was still in the base but then was only sporadically used him. In his third and final season with UVV Van Reenen jogged occasionally injured. UVV was almost the whole season down and eventually relegated. Despite the team turned bad and constantly changing compositions came Van Reenen still managed still in the field to 10 goals in 13 games. In his time at Van Reenen UVV came three appearances with one goal against Ajax. He apparently impressed enough to be allowed to play at Ajax in 1929 after the degradation of UVV. At Ajax he played on September 15, 1929 (debut against DFC) until October 18, 1942 (against Blauw-Wit Amsterdam). After Van Reenen had stopped all actually after the 1939-1940 season he later sometimes turn up as Ajax was in distress. Van Reenen eventually stopped at 33 with football.

=== International football ===
Despite his great talent, Van Reenen played only two matches for the Dutch national team scoring no goals, due to a disagreement with the team's coach, Bob Glendenning. According to reports, Glendenning and Van Reenen clashed over tactics and playing style, and as a result, van Reenen was left out of the national team for an extended period.

== Career statistics ==
Club	Season	League		League Play-Off		Dutch Cup		Europe		Total	
Club	Season	Apps	Goals	Apps	Goals	Apps	Goals	Apps	Goals	Apps	Goals
Ajax	1929–30	18	21	8	9	1	0	–	–	27	30
Ajax	1930–31	15	22	8	12	0	0	–	–	23	34
Ajax	1931–32	17	27	7	14	0	0	–	–	24	41
Ajax	1932–33	18	24	0	0	0	0	–	–	18	24
Ajax	1933–34	10	16	10	12	0	0	–	–	20	28
Ajax	1934–35	18	21	6	3	1	4	–	–	25	28
Ajax	1935–36	16	22	6	3	1	0	–	–	23	25
Ajax	1936–37	17	22	8	8	0	0	–	–	25	30
Ajax	1937–38	14	16	0	0	1	1	–	–	15	17
Ajax	1938–39	15	10	8	3	0	0	–	–	23	13
Ajax	1939–40	10	8	0	0	0	0	–	–	10	8
Ajax	1941–42	6	4	0	0	0	0	–	–	6	4
Ajax	1942–43	3	1	0	0	0	0	–	–	3	1
Ajax	Total	177	214	61	64	4	5	–	–	242	283

== Honours ==
- Eredivisie: 1930-31, 1932-33, 1933-34, 1936-37, 1938-39
- KNVB Cup: 1942-43
- Eredivisie top scorer: 1929-30,1930–31,1931–32,1932–33,1933–34,1934–35,1935–36,1936–37,1937–38
