= Anita Coronel =

Dutch businesswoman (born 1979)

- Born: July 10, 1979 (age 47); Amsterdam, Netherlands
- Education: Vossius Gymnasium; London School of Economics (MSc); Stockholm School of Economics (MSc); INSEAD (MBA)
- Occupations: Business executive, football administrator
- Years active: 2006–present
- Employer(s): Boston Consulting Group, AFC Ajax N.V.
- Known for: Member of the Supervisory Board of AFC Ajax
- Title: Member of the Supervisory Board, AFC Ajax N.V. Managing Director and Partner, Boston Consulting Group
- Relatives: Uri Coronel (uncle)

Anita Coronel (born 10 July 1979) is a Dutch corporate executive, management consultant, and football administrator. She serves as a managing director and Partner at Boston Consulting Group (BCG) and as a member of the supervisory board (Raad van Commissarissen) of Eredivisie club AFC Ajax N.V., having been appointed in March 2026.

== Early life and education ==
Coronel was born on 10 July 1979 in Amsterdam, Netherlands, where she grew up in a Jewish family. She is the niece of Uri Coronel (1946–2016), a lawyer and former Chairman of AFC Ajax. During her youth, she played field hockey in the top-tier Dutch Hoofdklasse for Pinoké.

She attended the Vossius Gymnasium in Amsterdam, graduating in 1997. In 2004, she earned dual Master of Science degrees in Management and International Management from the London School of Economics and Political Science (LSE) and the Stockholm School of Economics (SSE). In 2010, she earned a Master of Business Administration (MBA) from INSEAD, completing her studies in France and Singapore.

== Corporate career ==
In 2006, Coronel joined Boston Consulting Group (BCG) in Amsterdam. She was promoted to Partner in 2019 and later became managing director and Partner. In 2025, she assumed leadership of BCG's People & Organization practice group across Europe, South America, Africa, and the Middle East (EMESA), specializing in workforce strategy, organizational design, and corporate culture.

In non-executive governance, Coronel served as vice-chair of the supervisory board (Raad van Toezicht) of Stichting ALS Nederland from 2016 to 2025, a role she accepted following the death of her father from amyotrophic lateral sclerosis.

== Football administration ==
=== AFC Ajax ===
On 20 January 2026, the supervisory board of AFC Ajax N.V. officially nominated Coronel alongside Lesley Bamberger, Marry de Gaay Fortman, Edo Ophof, and Duncan Stutterheim as new board members. Her nomination received backing from the club's Works Council (Ondernemingsraad) and executive board (Bestuursraad).

She was formally appointed during an Extraordinary General Meeting of Shareholders (EGM/BAVA) on 9 March 2026 for a four-year term running until 2030. On the board, her duties focus on organizational structure, talent management, human resources, and internal corporate culture.
