= Jan Potharst =

Dutch footballer (1918–2008)

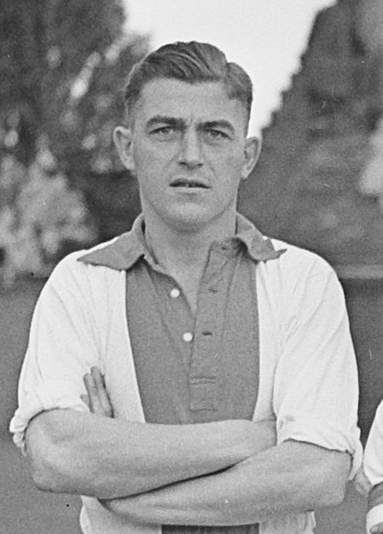

Personal information
- Full name: Jan Hilbert Potharst
- Date of birth: 4 January 1918
- Place of birth: Amsterdam, Netherlands
- Date of death: 6 September 2008 (aged 90)
- Place of death: Amsterdam, Netherlands
- Position: Defender

Youth career
- 1928–1932: VVA
- 1932–1939: Ajax

Senior career*
Years	Team	Apps	(Gls)
1939–1952	Ajax	237	(0)

International career^{‡}
1946–1950	Netherlands	6	(0)
- * Club domestic league appearances and goals as of 4 March 2014 ‡ National team caps and goals as of 1:42, 4 March 2014 (UTC)

Jan Hilbert Potharst (4 January 1918 – 6 September 2008) was a Dutch association football player, who played as a defender for AFC Ajax and for the Netherlands national team.

== Career ==
=== AFC Ajax ===
Born and raised in Amsterdam, Jan Potharst began his football career in the youth ranks of local side VVA, before switching over to play in the ranks of Ajax at the age of 14. Advancing through the youth ranks, Jan Potharst made his debut for the first team on 5 March 1939 in an away match against VSV. In a career that spanned thirteen years, Jan Potharst made 237 appearances in the shirt of Ajax. He won the national championship in his first season with the first team, and again in the 1946–47 season. He also helped Ajax to win the Dutch Cup (then NVB Cup) in 1943. He was the team captain during his final seasons at the club, having never scored a goal his entire career.

== International career ==
On 12 May 1946 Jan Potharst made his debut for the Netherlands national team in a 6–3 win over Belgium, making a total of six appearances for the Dutch national team with his final call-up occurring in 1950.

== Business career ==
Following his playing career at Ajax, Jan Potharst joined the management at the club where he was made the commissioner of the board of directors and a member of merit. He was initiated as an Honorary club member at his farewell ceremony from the club, and in 1995 he hammered in the first pole at the construction site to build the new Ajax training facility Sportpark De Toekomst.

== Honours ==
Ajax

Dutch championship (2): 1938–39, 1946–47
NVB Cup: 1942–43
