= Lucky Lynx =

- First appearance: 2000

In-universe information
- Occupation: Mascot

Lucky Lynx, commonly known as Lucky, is the mascot of Dutch football club Ajax Amsterdam playing in the Eredivisie, a role he has filled since 2000.

On 20 December 2015, he was replaced by his son Lucky Junior.

== Biography ==
Since the year 2000, Lucky Lynx has been entertaining Ajax fans at the Amsterdam ArenA as well at any Ajax Kids Club events, school events as well as charity events in and around the city of Amsterdam. Lucky is a Lynx, who according to his fictional biography was born on the top of Mount Olympus in Greece, has yellow eyes. Brown, black and white hair, is 1,75 meters tall, wears a size 58 shoe, and whose hobbies include playing football. As the face for the Ajax Kids Club, a fan club for children initiated on 6 December 2000, Lucky is the central character in the Fan clubs Kids magazine, and is a popular character amongst fans at games and social events.

His name was derived from the Lucky Ajax team, which was created by "Mr. Ajax" Sjaak Swart, a beneficiary team consisting of ex-Ajax players who compete in at least one charity match a year.

== Costume ==
The Lucky Lynx suit consists of a whole-body lynx costume made of black, brown and white fur with large yellow eyes, and a short tail. Over the suit, Lucky wears an authentic uniform (white/red/white home kit), an Ajax baseball cap of the same colors, and team-appointed athletic shoes. His jersey bears the name "Lucky" on the back.

== Duties ==
In addition to photo opportunities and entertaining the crowd at Ajax games, Lucky also makes public appearances throughout the greater Amsterdam area on behalf of the team. As the key figure of the Ajax Kids Club, he appears at schools to promote tolerance, teamwork and companionship and the importance of a good education. There is a monthly Ajax fanzine for Kids that comes with the kids club membership, of which Lucky is the main character. The magazine also features a comic strip starring Lucky Lynx, which is illustrated by Dutch cartoonist Maarten Rijnen. Lucky can also be booked for private events.
