= Harold Rose =

English footballer and manager

Personal information
- Full name: Harold Bernard Rose
- Date of birth: 27 March 1900
- Place of birth: Reading, England
- Date of death: May 1990 (aged 89-90)
- Place of death: Reading, England
- Position: Centre half

Senior career*
Years	Team	Apps	(Gls)
- Reading Liberal Club
- Imperial
1920–1921	Reading	5	(0)
1921–1924	Bristol Rovers	14	(0)
- Mid Rhondda United
- Ebbw Vale
Total		19+	(0+)

Managerial career
- 1925–1926: Ajax
- * Club domestic league appearances and goals

Harold Bernard Rose (27 March 1900 – May 1990) was an English football player and manager.

== Playing career ==
Rose, who played as a centre half, played in the Football League for Reading and Bristol Rovers. He also played for Reading Liberal Club, Imperial, Mid Rhondda United and Ebbw Vale.

== Coaching career ==
Rose managed Dutch side Ajax between 1925 and 1926.

== Personal life ==
He was married to Edith Ward.
