= AFC Ajax =

Association football club in Netherlands

Coordinates: 52°18′51″N 4°56′31″E

Ajax
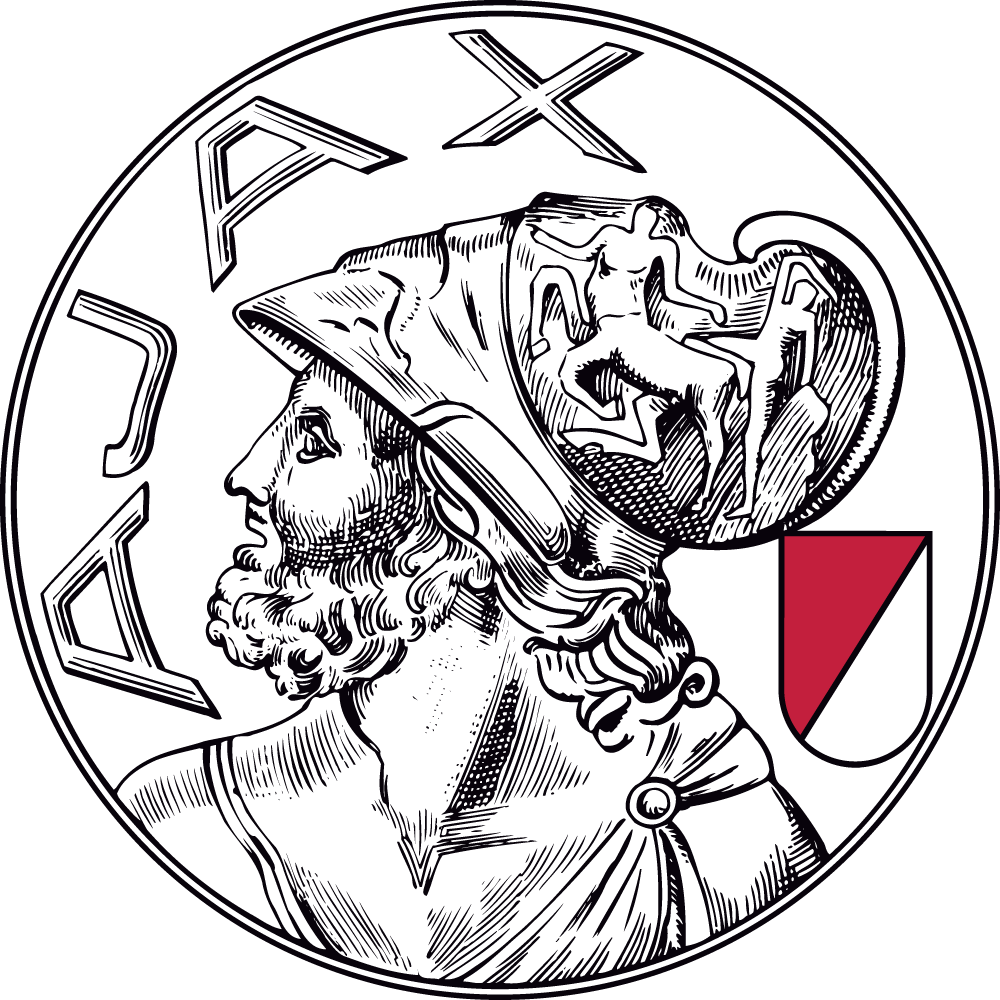
- Full name: Amsterdamsche Football Club Ajax
- Nicknames: de Godenzonen (Sons of the Gods) de Joden (the Jews); Lucky Ajax the Lancers
- Founded: 18 March 1900; 126 years ago
- Stadium: Johan Cruyff Arena
- Capacity: 55,865
- Owner: AFC Ajax N.V. (Euronext Amsterdam: AJAX)
- Chairman: Ernst Boekhorst
- Head coach: Míchel
- League: Eredivisie
- 2025–26: Eredivisie, 5th of 18
- Website: ajax.nl
Home colours	Away colours	Third colours

Amsterdamsche Football Club Ajax (Dutch: [ˈaːjɑks]), also known as AFC Ajax, Ajax Amsterdam, or simply Ajax, is a Dutch professional football club based in Amsterdam, that plays in the Eredivisie, the top tier in Dutch football. Historically, Ajax (named after the legendary Greek hero) is the most successful club in the Netherlands, with 36 Eredivisie titles and 20 KNVB Cups, both records. It has continuously played in the Eredivisie since the league's inception in 1956, and along with Feyenoord and PSV Eindhoven, it is one of the country's "big three" clubs.

Ajax was one of the most successful clubs in the world in the 20th century. According to the International Federation of Football History & Statistics, Ajax was the seventh-most successful European club of the 20th century and The World's Club Team of the Year in 1992. According to German magazine Kicker, Ajax was the second-most successful European club of the 20th century. The club is one of five teams that have earned the right to keep the European Cup and to wear a multiple-winner badge. In 1972, they completed the continental treble by winning the Eredivisie, KNVB Cup, and the European Cup. They also won the first (albeit unofficial) European Super Cup against Rangers in January 1973. Ajax's most recent international trophies are the 1995 Intercontinental Cup, 1995 UEFA Super Cup and the 1995 Champions League, where they defeated Milan in the final; they lost the 1996 Champions League final on penalties to Juventus. In 1995, Ajax was crowned as World Team of the Year by World Soccer magazine.

Ajax is also one of four teams to win the continental treble and the Intercontinental Cup or Club World Cup in the same season/calendar year; (Note: with Manchester United in 1999, Bayern Munich in 2013, and Barcelona twice, in 2009 and in 2015.) this was achieved in the 1971–72 season. Ajax is one of five clubs to have won all three major UEFA club competitions played until 2021. They have also won the Intercontinental Cup twice, the 1991–92 UEFA Cup, as well as the Karl Rappan Cup, a predecessor of the UEFA Intertoto Cup in 1962. Ajax plays at the Johan Cruyff Arena, which opened as the Amsterdam ArenA in 1996 and was renamed in 2018. They previously played at De Meer Stadion and the Amsterdam Olympic Stadium (for international matches). Throughout their history, Ajax have cultivated a reputation for scouting, spotting and developing young talent, and have remained focused on developing a youth system.

== History ==
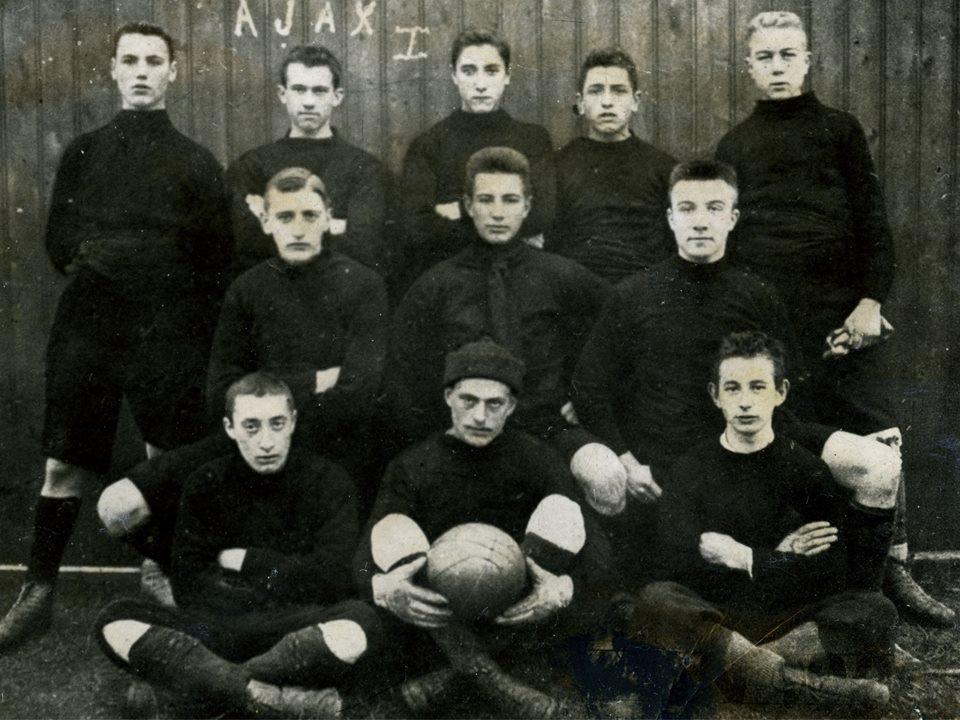
Ajax's former squad in 1900

Ajax was founded in Amsterdam on 18 March 1900. The club achieved promotion to the highest level of Dutch football in 1911 and had its first major success in 1917, winning the KNVB Beker, the Netherlands' national cup. The following season, Ajax became national champion for the first time. The club defended its title in 1918–19, becoming the only team to achieve an unbeaten season in the Netherlands Football League Championship.

Throughout the 1920s, Ajax was a strong regional power, winning the Eerste Klasse West division in 1921, 1927 and 1928, but could not maintain its success at the national level. This changed in the 1930s, with the club winning five national championships (1931, 1932, 1934, 1937, 1939), making it the most successful Dutch team of the decade. Ajax won its second KNVB Cup in 1942–43, and an eighth Dutch title in 1946–47, the last season the club was managed by Englishman Jack Reynolds, who, up to this point, had overseen all of its national championship successes as well as its 1917 KNVB Cup win.

In 1956, the first season of the Netherlands' new professional league, the Eredivisie, was played with Ajax participating as a founding member. The Amsterdam club became the first national champions under the new format and made its debut in the European Champion Clubs' Cup the following year, losing to Hungarian champions Vasas SC 6–2 on aggregate at the quarter-final stage. The team was again Eredivisie champions in 1960 and won a third KNVB Cup in 1961.

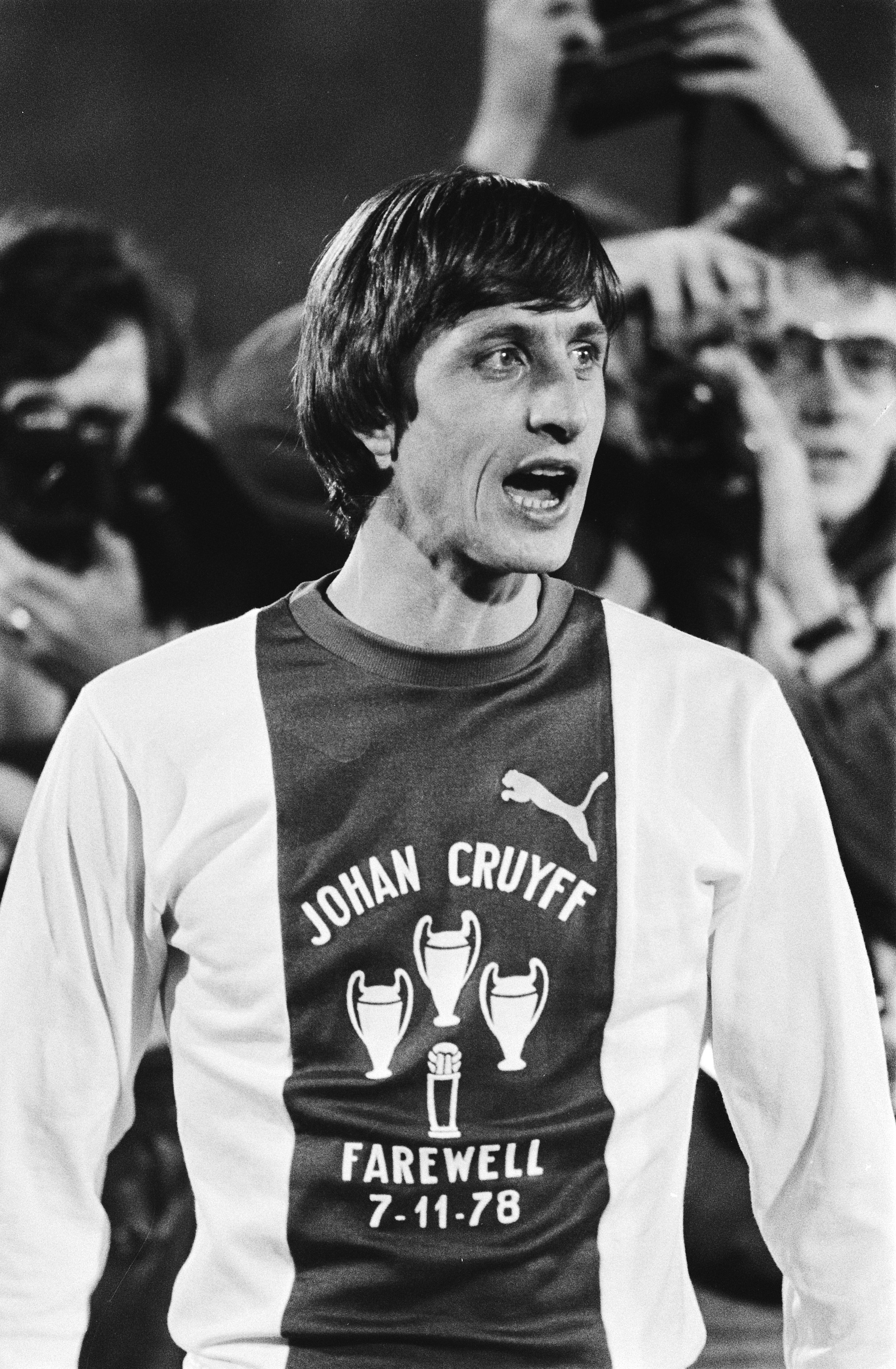
Johan Cruyff played at Ajax from 1959 to 1973, and from 1981 to 1983, winning 3 European Cups; his No. 14 is the only squad number Ajax has ever retired. Cruyff came back to manage the club from 1985 to 1988.

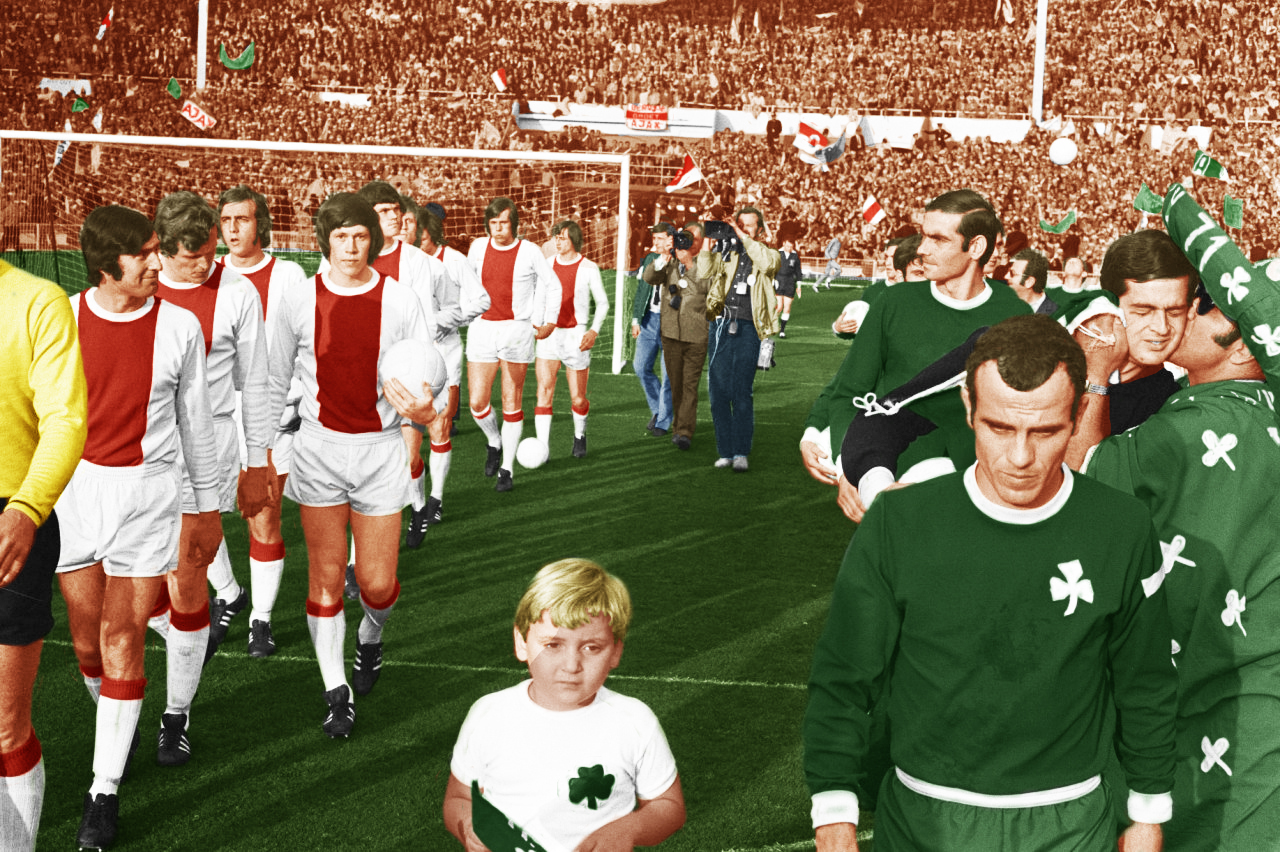
Against Panathinaikos in the 1971 European Cup Final

In 1965, Rinus Michels, who had played for the club between 1946 and 1958, was appointed manager of Ajax, implementing his philosophy of Total Football which was to become synonymous with both Ajax and the Netherlands national team. A year earlier, Johan Cruyff, who would go on to become widely regarded as the greatest Dutch footballer of all time, made his debut. Between them, Michels and Cruyff led Ajax through the most successful period in its history, winning seven Eredivisie titles, four KNVB Cups and three European Cups.

Ajax won the Dutch championship in 1966, 1967 and 1968, and reached the 1969 European Cup final, losing to Milan. During the 1966–67 season, Ajax scored a record 122 goals in an Eredivisie season and also won the KNVB Cup to achieve its first league and cup double. In 1969–70, Ajax won a fourth Dutch league championship and second league and cup double in five seasons, winning 27 out of 34 league matches and scoring 100 goals.

The 1970–71 season saw Ajax retain the KNVB Cup and reach the 1971 European Cup final, where they defeated Panathinaikos 2–0 with goals from Dick van Dijk and Arie Haan to become continental champions for the first time, with Cruyff being named European Footballer of the Year. After this success, Michels departed to become manager of Barcelona and was replaced by the Romanian Ștefan Kovács. In Kovács' first season, Ajax completed a treble of the European Cup, the Eredivisie and a third consecutive KNVB Cup. The following season, the team beat Argentine Club Atlético Independiente to win the 1972 Intercontinental Cup and retained their Eredivisie and European Cup titles, becoming the first club to win three consecutive European Cups since Real Madrid in the 1950s.

In 1973, Michels' Barcelona broke the world transfer record to bring Cruyff to the Catalan team. Kovács also departed to become manager of the France national team, signalling the end of this period of international success.

In 1976–77, Ajax won its first domestic championship in four seasons and recorded a double of the Eredivisie and KNVB Cup two years later.

The early 1980s saw the return of Cruyff to the club, as well as the emergence of young players Marco van Basten and Frank Rijkaard. The team won back-to-back Eredivisie titles in 1982 and 1983, with all three playing a significant role in the latter. After Cruyff's sale to rivals Feyenoord in 1983, van Basten became Ajax's key player, top scoring in the Eredivisie for four seasons between 1983–84 and 1986–87.

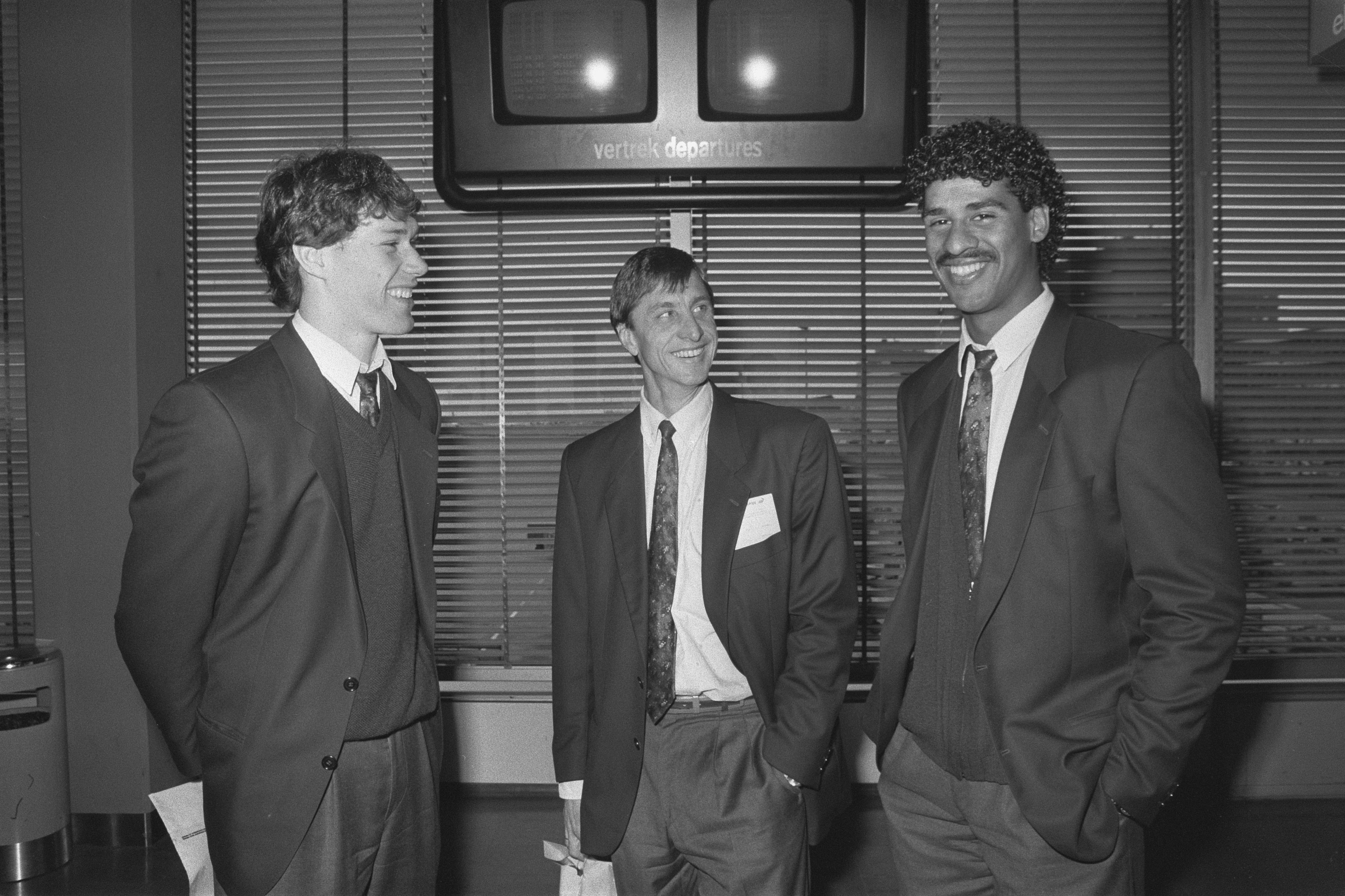
Cruijff, seen here with van Basten and Rijkaard, returned as manager in 1985.

In 1985, Cruyff returned to Ajax as manager and the team ended his first season in charge with 120 goals from 34 matches. However, Ajax still finished as runner-up to PSV by eight points. The following season, Ajax again lost out on the Eredivisie title to PSV, but won the European Cup Winners' Cup, its first continental trophy in 14 years. After this, Cruyff left the club to become manager of Barcelona and Rijkaard and van Basten were sold to Sporting CP and Milan respectively. Despite these losses, Ajax reached a second consecutive Cup Winners' Cup final in 1988, where they lost to Belgian club KV Mechelen.

The 1988–89 season saw Dennis Bergkamp, a young forward who had first appeared under Cruyff in 1986, establish himself as a regular goalscorer for Ajax. Bergkamp helped Ajax to the Eredivisie title and was the top scorer in the division in 1990–91, 1991–92 and 1992–93. Under the management of Louis van Gaal, Ajax won the UEFA Cup in 1992 to become the second club, after Juventus, to have won all three major European club competitions.

After the sale of Bergkamp to Internazionale in 1993, van Gaal re-signed the experienced Rijkaard to complement his young Ajax team featuring academy graduates Frank and Ronald de Boer, Edwin van der Sar, Clarence Seedorf, Edgar Davids, Michael Reiziger and Winston Bogarde, as well as mercurial foreign talents Finidi George, Nwankwo Kanu and Jari Litmanen, and veteran captain Danny Blind. The team regained the Dutch championship in 1993–94, and won it again in 1994–95 and 1995–96 to become the first Ajax side to win three back-to-back championships since 1968. The height of van Gaal's success came in 1994–95, where Ajax became the first, and to date only, team to complete an entire Eredivisie season unbeaten. The team also won its first European Cup since its 1970s era, defeating Milan in the 1995 UEFA Champions League final 1–0, with the winning goal scored by 18-year-old Patrick Kluivert. Ajax again reached the final one year later, and was defeated on penalties by Juventus.

Ajax's return as a European force was short-lived, as van Gaal and several members of the squad soon departed to some of the continent's biggest clubs. The 2000s was a lean decade for the club, with only two Eredivisie championships won. However, Ajax's academy continued to produce star players such as Wesley Sneijder and Rafael van der Vaart.

In 2010, Frank de Boer was appointed manager of Ajax and led the club to its first league title in seven years, and record 30th title overall, in the 2010–11 season. This was followed by back-to-back wins in 2011–12 and 2012–13 to match his three consecutive titles as a player in the 1990s. In 2013–14, Ajax was again Eredivisie champions, winning four consecutive league titles for the first time in club history. After finishing as runner-up to PSV in both 2014–15 and 2015–16, de Boer resigned as Ajax head coach in May 2016.

Peter Bosz took over the club and led them to the 2017 UEFA Europa League final, their first European final in 21 years. They lost to Manchester United with a lineup that was the youngest ever in a European final, averaging an age of 22 years and 282 days. For the third consecutive season, they finished runner-up in the Eredivisie, this time to Feyenoord.

The 2018–19 season for Ajax involved a remarkable run in the UEFA Champions League. Due to their runner-up finish in the 2017–18 Eredivisie, Ajax entered the tournament in the second qualifying round. After successive victories against Sturm Graz, Standard Liège and Dynamo Kyiv, they qualified for the group stage. Ajax was drawn in a group with German champions Bayern Munich, Portuguese side Benfica and Greek champions AEK Athens. Ajax finished runner-up in this group, qualifying for the knockout stages, where it was drawn against three-time defending champions Real Madrid. After losing 1–2 in the first leg, they defeated Real Madrid 4–1 in the away match, stunning the defending champions in their own stadium, the Santiago Bernabéu, with an aggregate score of 5–3. Dušan Tadić was awarded a perfect score of 10 by L'Équipe following the match.

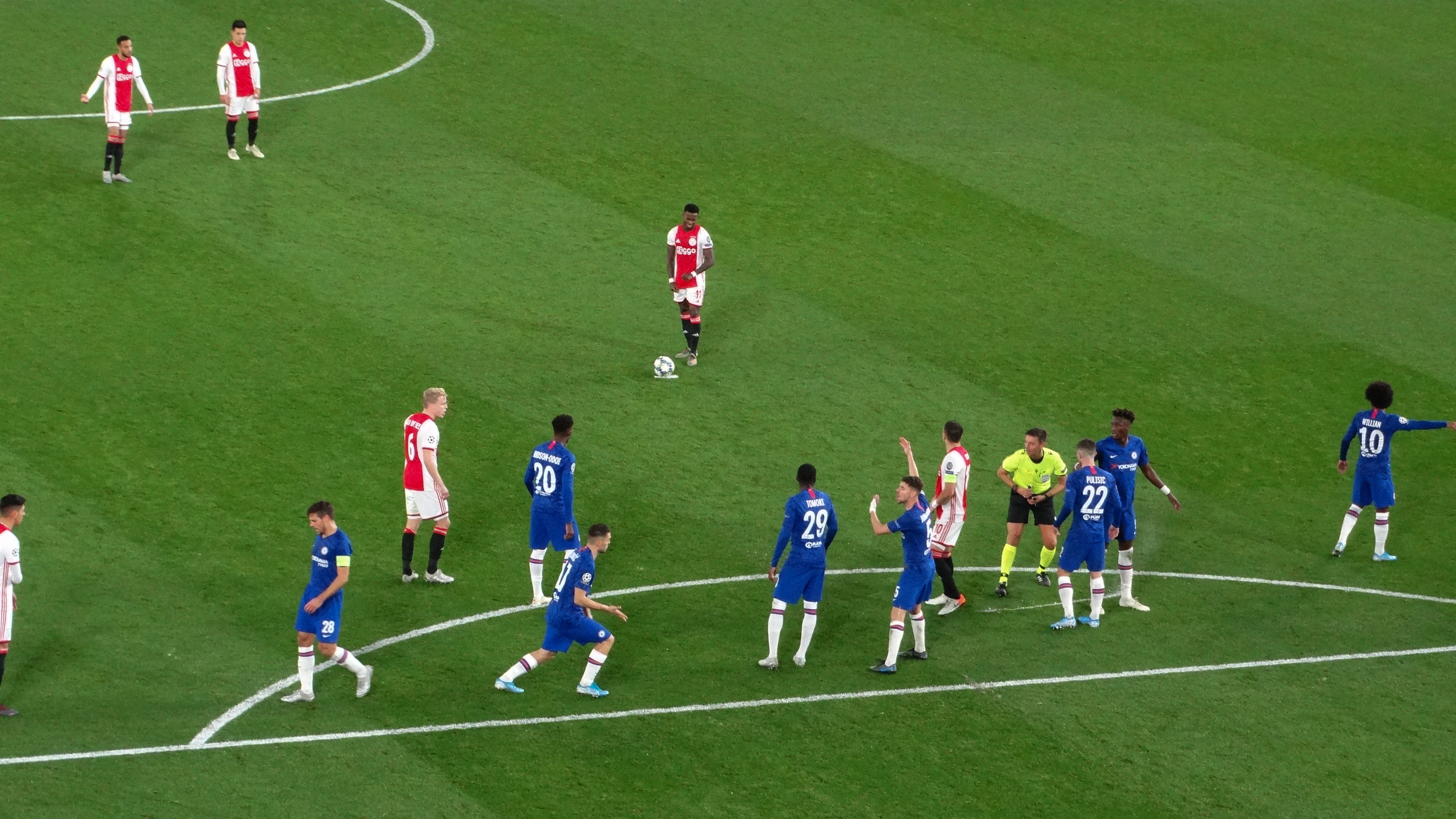
Against Chelsea in the 2019-2020 UEFA Champions League

Thus, Ajax progressed to the quarter-finals and was drawn with Italian champions Juventus. In the first leg in the Johan Cruyff Arena, they drew 1–1. In the second leg at the Juventus Stadium, Ajax came from behind to win 2–1 and 3–2 on aggregate. Matthijs de Ligt scored the winning goal for Ajax to help the team advance to its first Champions League semi-final since 1997. There, they would face English side Tottenham Hotspur.

In the first leg of the semi-final, Ajax beat Tottenham 1–0 away from home. In the second leg, Ajax scored twice in the first half to generate a 3–0 lead on aggregate. However, in the second half, Lucas Moura scored three times, including in the 6th minute of added time, resulting in Ajax losing via the away goals rule.

Ajax was in first place on goal difference when the Eredivisie was declared void, preventing them being Dutch champions for the 35th time, but still qualified for the 2020–21 UEFA Champions League.

In this, it was eliminated again, but in 2021 it reached the quarter-finals of the Europa League. It was eliminated against AS Roma. That season, it again won both the national title and the KNVB Cup.

In the 2021-22 season, Ajax again became champion of the Netherlands. It had to give up the KNVB Cup and the Johan Cruijff Shield to competitor PSV because it came out on the losing end in both finals. In European terms, Ajax achieved first place in the Champions League group, all six matches were won, mostly by a wide margin. After the winter break, Ajax was narrowly eliminated in the eighth finals by the Portuguese Benfica Lisboa (Lisbon) (2–2 away, 0–1 at home).

As of 1 July 2022, Alfred Schreuder succeeded Erik ten Hag, who left for Manchester United, as Ajax's coach. Most of the key players from previous seasons left during the summer transfer period, but there was also a lot of reinvestment. Ajax started the 2022/23 season relatively well with six consecutive victories in the Eredivisie. But Ajax was eliminated from the Champions League quite quickly in a group with Liverpool, Napoli and Rangers. At home against Napoli on 4 October 2022, they even lost by 5 goals (1–6), Ajax's biggest defeat ever in European competition. After seven consecutive matches without a win, head coach Alfred Schreuder was dismissed. John Heitinga succeeded Schreuder as interim manager. Under Heitinga, Ajax failed to turn things around despite a good start, with seven wins in a row. Ajax finished third in the Eredivisie, behind champions Feyenoord and runners-up PSV. This was the club's lowest ranking since the 2008/09 season, in which it also finished third. After the winter break, Ajax was eliminated in the first knockout phase of the Europa League by Union Berlin (3–1). Ajax did reach the final of the KNVB Cup, but lost to PSV on penalties (3–2).

On 19 May 2023, Sven Mislintat took over as Ajax's sports director. He succeeded Marc Overmars, who left in early 2022. Mislintat appointed Maurice Steijn as head coach. Mislintat spent approximately 111 million euros on transfers. Ajax had its worst start to the season in fifty-nine years. On 29 October 2023, Ajax reached a historic low. Ajax lost 5–2 to PSV in Eindhoven. This put Ajax in last place, 18th place in the Eredivisie, for the first time since the club was founded.

The position of director Mislintat became an embarrassment after it emerged that he had arranged a transfer through a player agent who was an investor in his company. In the evening of 24 September, Mislintat was fired with immediate effect; among other things, a lack of broad support within the club was one of the reasons. A day after the loss against PSV, it was announced that John van 't Schip would become the head coach until the end of the season. Under the leadership of Van 't Schip, Ajax managed to climb to fifth place in the Eredivisie. In the Europa League, Ajax finished third, which meant a place in the next season's Conference League, where it eventually lost to Aston Villa in the round of 16. In the cup, Ajax was eliminated 3–2 by the third division amateurs of USV Hercules.

In the summer of 2024, a rebuild began, with a new board of directors and Alex Kroes and Marijn Beuker as Technical Director and Director of Football. They hired Francesco Farioli as new head coach, the first foreign coach since 1998. Under his leadership, Ajax reached the league phase of the Europa League, where it finished eleventh. On 9 February 2025, Ajax finished the weekend on the first place for the first time since November 2022. Ajax would end the season second to PSV, despite being nine points clear of their rivals with five matches to go. Due to the late collapse that cost them the title and escalating tensions over transfers, tactics and finances, Farioli decided to leave Ajax on 19 May 2025.

=== UEFA ranking ===
As of 12 February 2025

29	(Netherlands)	Ajax	66.250

== Academies ==
The club is also particularly famous for its renowned youth programme that has produced many Dutch talents over the years. Johan Cruyff, Edwin van der Sar, Gerald Vanenburg, Frank Rijkaard, Dennis Bergkamp, Rafael van der Vaart, Patrick Kluivert, Marco van Basten, Wesley Sneijder, Maarten Stekelenburg, Nigel de Jong, Frenkie de Jong, and Matthijs de Ligt have come through the ranks and are just some of the talents who have played for Ajax. Ajax also regularly supplies the Dutch national youth teams with local players.

Due to mutual agreements with foreign clubs, the youth academy has also signed foreign players as teenagers before making first team debuts, such as Belgian defensive trio Jan Vertonghen, Toby Alderweireld and Thomas Vermaelen along with winger Tom De Mul, all of whom are full internationals, as well as Dutch international Vurnon Anita and Javier Martina, representing Curaçao.

Ajax has also expanded its talent searching programme to South Africa with Ajax Cape Town. Ajax Cape Town was set up with the help of Rob Moore. Ajax has also had a satellite club in the United States under the name Ajax America, until it filed for bankruptcy. There are some youth players from Ajax Cape Town that have been drafted into the Eredivisie squad, such as South African internationals Steven Pienaar and Thulani Serero and Cameroonian international Eyong Enoh.

In 1995, the year Ajax won the UEFA Champions League, the Netherlands national team was almost entirely composed of Ajax players, with van der Sar in goal; players such as Michael Reiziger, Frank de Boer and Danny Blind in defence; Ronald de Boer, Edgar Davids and Clarence Seedorf in midfield; and Patrick Kluivert and Marc Overmars in attack.

In 2011, Ajax opened its first youth academies outside the Netherlands when the club partnered with George Kazianis and All Star Consultancy in Greece to open the Ajax Hellas Youth Academy. The offices are based in Nea Smyrni, Attica, with the main training facility located on the island of Corfu, hosting a total of 15 football youth academies throughout Greece and Cyprus. Eddie van Schaik heads the organization as coach and consultant, introducing the Ajax football philosophy at the various football training camps of the country.

In 2016, Ajax launched the ACA (Ajax Coaching Academy) with the intention of sharing knowledge, and setting up a variety of camps and clinics for both players and coaches.

== Stadiums ==
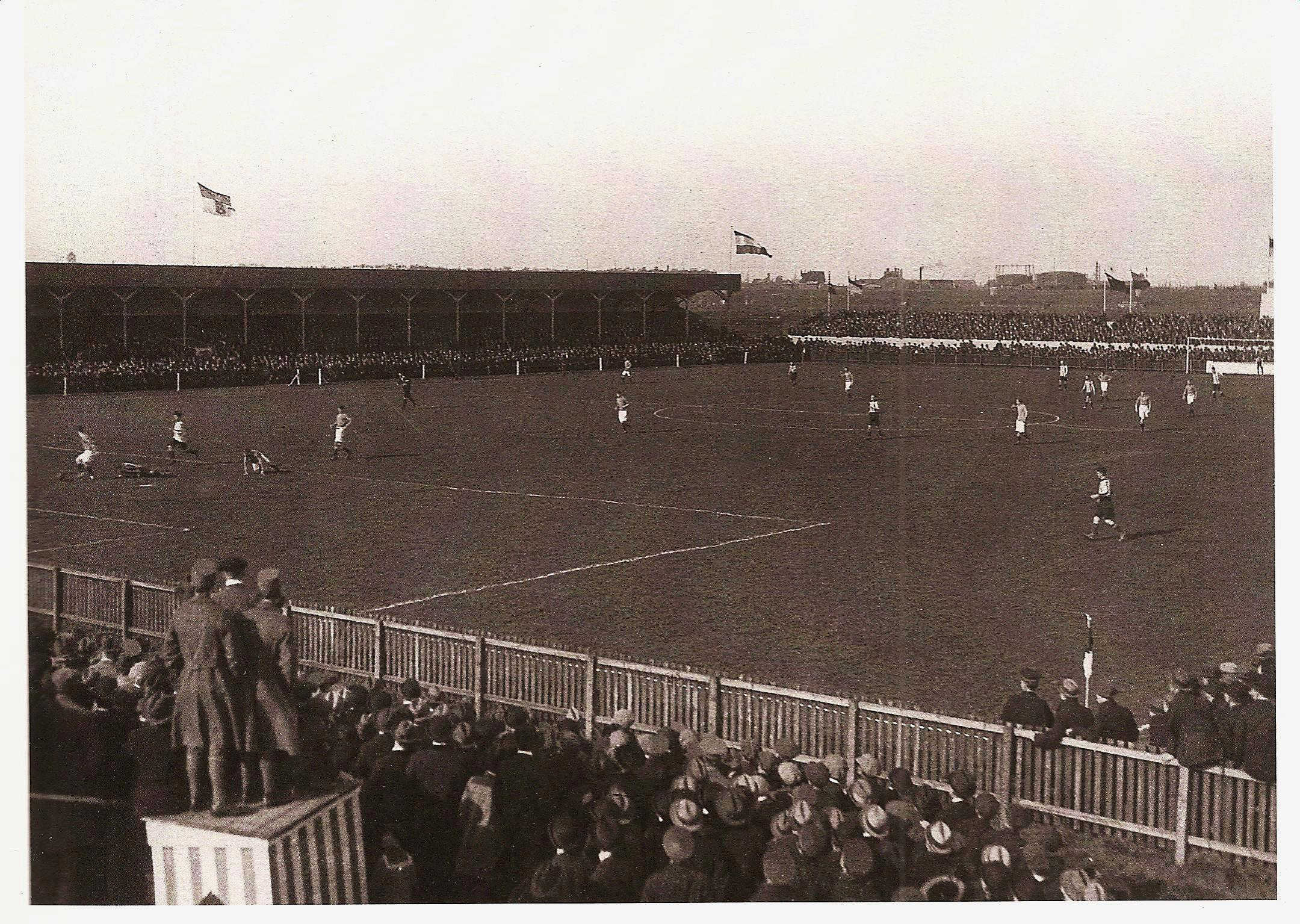
Het Houten Stadion, Ajax's first venue, c. 1917–18

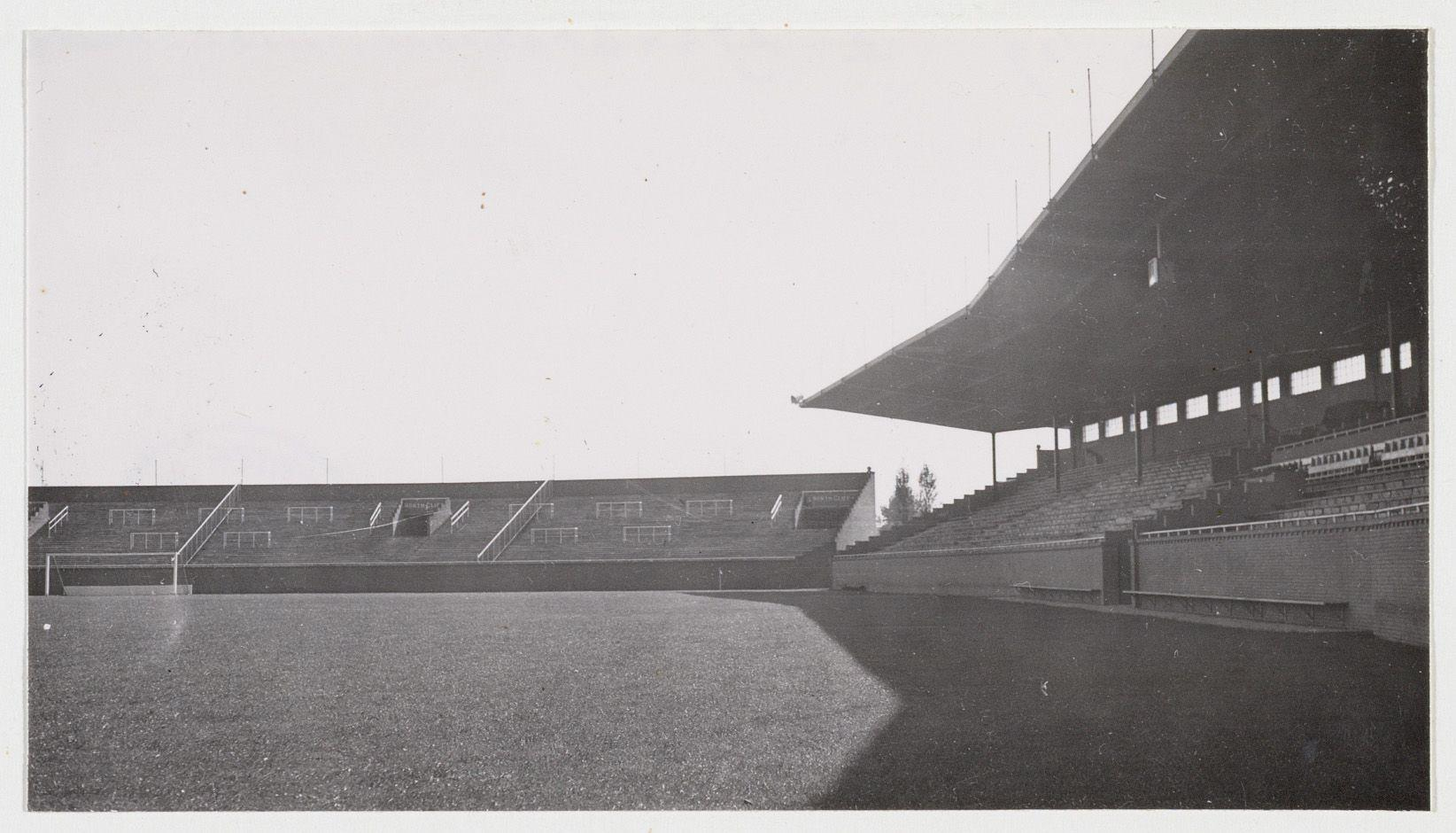
De Meer Stadion in 1937

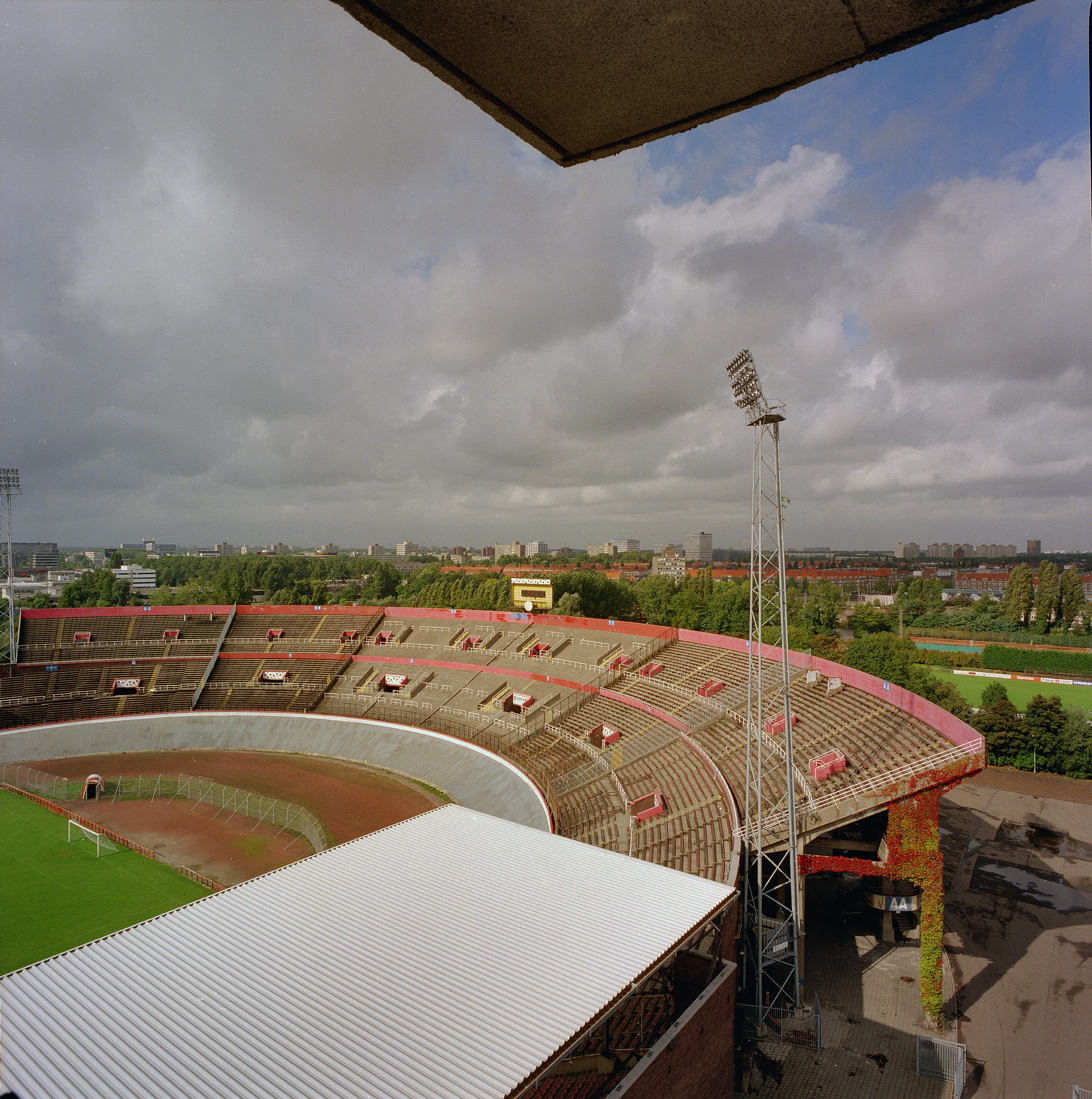
Olympic Stadium in 1995

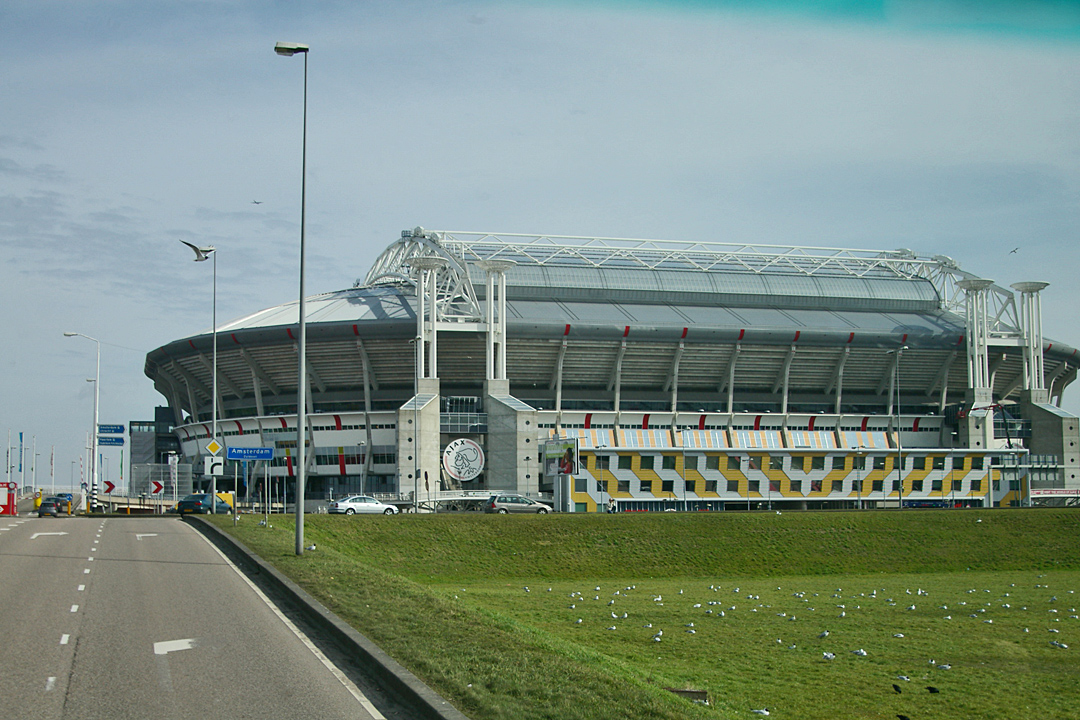
Johan Cruyff Arena, Ajax home ground since 1996

Ajax's first stadium was built in 1911 out of wood and was called Het Houten Stadion (English: The Wooden Stadium). Ajax later also played in the Olympic Stadium built for the 1928 Summer Olympics hosted in Amsterdam. This stadium, designed by Jan Wils, is known in Dutch as het Olympisch Stadion. In 1934, Ajax moved to De Meer Stadion in east Amsterdam, close to the location of Het Houten Stadion. It was designed by architect and Ajax-member Daan Roodenburgh, who had also designed the club's first stadium. It could accommodate 29,500 spectators and Ajax continued to play there until 1996. For notable European and national fixtures, the club would often play at the Olympic Stadium, which could accommodate about twice the number of spectators.

In 1996, Ajax moved to a new home ground in the southeast part of the city known as the Amsterdam Arena, since 2018 known as the Johan Cruyff Arena. This stadium was built by the Amsterdam city authority at a cost of $134 million. The stadium is capable of holding 55,865 spectators. The Arena has a retractable roof and set a trend for other modern stadiums built in Europe in the following years. In the Netherlands, the Arena earned a reputation for a terrible grass pitch caused by the removable roof that, even when open, takes away too much sunlight and fresh air. During the 2008–09 season, ground staff introduced an artificial lighting system that finally reduced this problem considerably.

The much-loved former stadium, De Meer Stadion, was torn down in 1996 and the land was sold to the city council. A residential neighbourhood now occupies the area. The only thing left of the old stadium are the letters "AJAX", which nowadays is in place on the façade of the entrance at the Johan Cruyff Arena. A replica of the same letters are at De Toekomst, near the Johan Cruyff Arena.

== Crest and colours ==
=== Crest ===
In 1900, when the club was founded, the emblem of Ajax was just a picture of an Ajax player. The crest was slightly altered following the club's promotion to the top division in 1911 to match the club's new outfits. In 1928, the club logo was introduced with the head of the Greek hero Ajax. The logo was once again changed in 1990 into an abstract version of the previous one. The new logo still sports the portrait of Ajax, but drawn with just 11 lines, symbolizing the 11 players of a football team. On 17 November 2024, Ajax announced on its official website that they would revert to the classic logo of 1928 from the 2025–26 season onward, making a comeback after 34 years.

Crest of Ajax
(1991–2025)

=== Colours ===
Ajax originally played in an all-black strip with a red sash tied around the players' waists, but that strip was soon replaced by a red/white striped shirt and black shorts. Red, black and white are the three colours of the flag of Amsterdam. Under manager Jack Kirwan, however, the club earned promotion to the top flight of Dutch football for the first time in 1911 (then the Eerste Klasse or 'First Class', later named the Eredivisie), Ajax was forced to change its colours because Sparta Rotterdam already had exactly the same outfit. Special kits for away fixtures did not exist at the time and according to football association regulations the newcomers had to change their colours if two teams in the same league had identical uniforms. Ajax opted for white shorts and white shirt with a broad, vertical red stripe over chest and back, which remains their colours in the present day.

== Financial ==
=== AFC Ajax N.V. ===
AFC Ajax is the only Dutch club with an initial public offering (IPO). The club is registered as a Naamloze vennootschap (N.V.) listed on the stock exchange Euronext Amsterdam, since 17 May 1998. With a launch price of ƒ25,- (Guilders) the club managed to a bring its total revenue up to €54 million (converted) in its first year on the market. After short-lived success, however, the rate dropped, at one point as low as €3.50. Criticism was brought forth that the legal grid for a naamloze vennootschap would not be suitable for a Football club, and that the sports related ambitions would suffer from the new commercial interests of the now listed Ajax. Shares of the company in the year 2008 were valued at approximately €5.90 per share.

In 2008, a Commission under guidance of honorary member Uri Coronel concluded that the IPO was of no value to the club, and that measures should be taken to exit the stock exchange by purchasing back all public shares. Ajax remain on the stock exchange.

=== Sponsorship ===
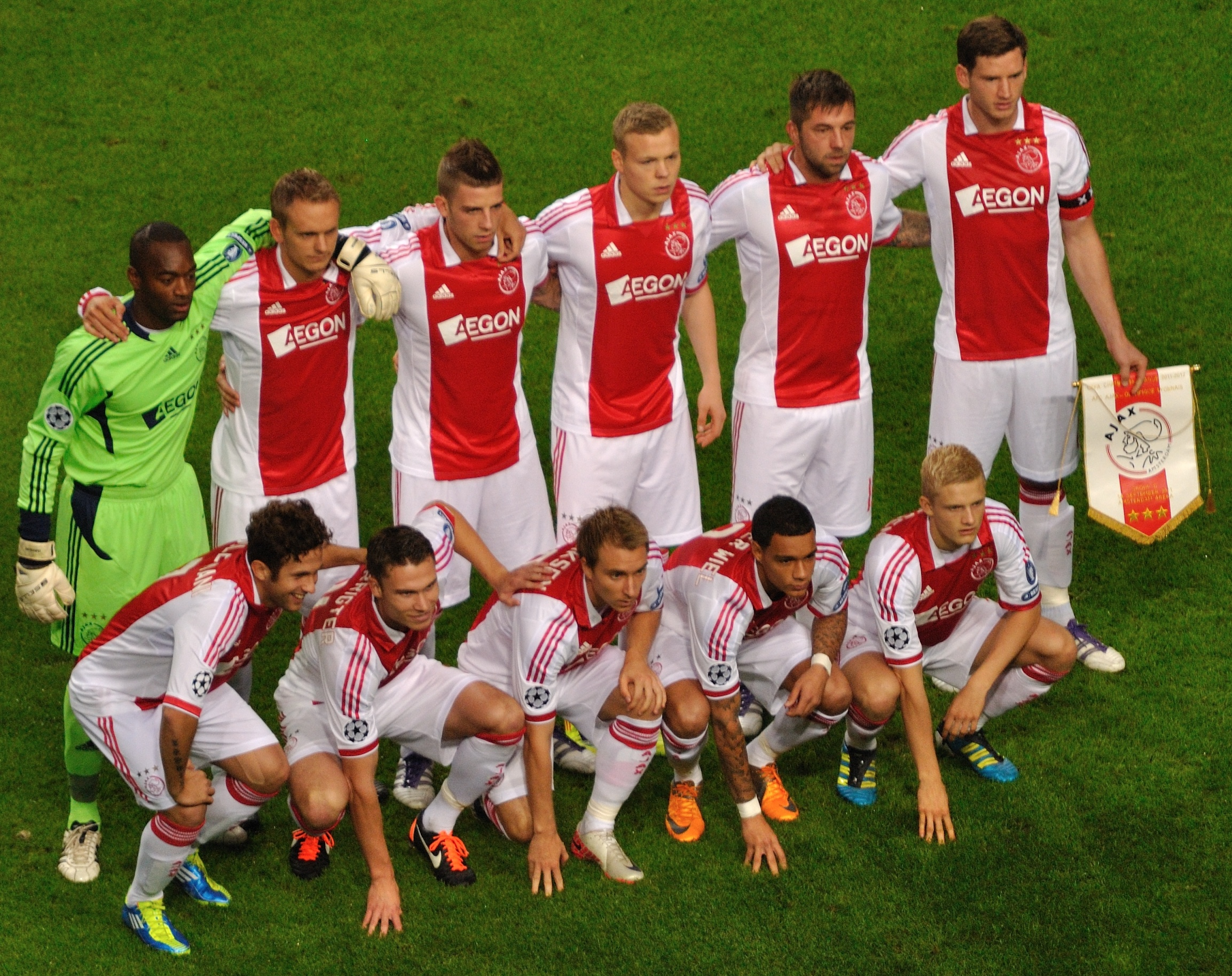
2011 AFC Ajax team wearing its home kit by adidas with the AEGON sponsor across the chest, ahead of its UEFA Champions League match against Olympique Lyonnais.

Ajax's shirts have been sponsored by TDK from 1982 to 1991, and by ABN AMRO from 1991 to 2008. AEGON then replaced ABN AMRO as the new head sponsor for a period of seven years. On 1 April 2007, Ajax wore a different sponsor for the match against Heracles Almelo, Florius. Florius is a banking programme launched by ABN AMRO who wanted it to be the shirt sponsor for one match.

The shirts have been manufactured by Le Coq Sportif (1973–1977), Puma (1977–1979), Cor du Buy (1979–1980), Le Coq Sportif (1980–1984), Kappa (1985–1989) and Umbro (1989–2000) in the past, and by Adidas since 2000 (until at least 2025).

At the conclusion of the 2013–14 season, Ajax won the Football shirt of the Year award for its black and rose colored away shirt by Adidas. The annual award was presented by Subside Sports, which had previously given the award to Internazionale, Juventus and the Belgium national team. It was Ajax's first time winning the award.

On 7 November 2014, it was announced that Ajax had agreed to a four-and-a-half-year contract worth €8 million annually with Dutch cable operating company Ziggo as the new shirt sponsor for the club. Having extended its contract with AEGON for half a season until December, the club featured Fonds Gehandicaptensport, a charitable fund for handicapped sports on its away shirts for a six-month period before transitioning to Ziggo in 2015.

=== Kit suppliers and shirt sponsors ===
Period	Kit manufacturer	Shirt sponsor	Sleeve sponsor	Back sponsor
1973–1977	Le Coq Sportif	None	None	None
1977–1979	Puma	None	None	None
1979–1980	Cor du Buy	None	None	None
1980–1982	Le Coq Sportif	None	None	None
1982–1984	Le Coq Sportif	TDK	None	None
1985–1989	Kappa	TDK	None	None
1989–1991	Umbro	TDK	None	None
1991–2000	Umbro	ABN AMRO	None	None
2000–2008	Adidas	ABN AMRO	None	None
2008–2014	Adidas	AEGON	None	None
2014	Adidas	AEGON (Home) / Fonds Gehandicaptensport (Away)	None	None
2014–2020	Adidas	Ziggo	None	None
2020–2022	Adidas	Ziggo	Curaçao	None
2022–2023	Adidas	Ziggo	Curaçao	Ziggo GigaNet
2023–2027	Adidas	Ziggo	Curaçao	Ziggo Sport
2027–2031	Adidas			

=== Kit deals ===
Kit supplier	Period	Contract announcement	Contract duration	Value	Notes
Adidas	2000–present	13 July 2018	1 July 2019 – 30 June 2025	€50 million for six years	

== Other teams ==
=== Reserve team ===
Jong Ajax (formerly more commonly known as Ajax 2) is the reserve team of AFC Ajax. The team is composed mostly of professional footballers, who are often recent graduates from the highest youth level (Ajax A1) serving their first professional contract as a reserve, or players who are otherwise unable to play in the first team.

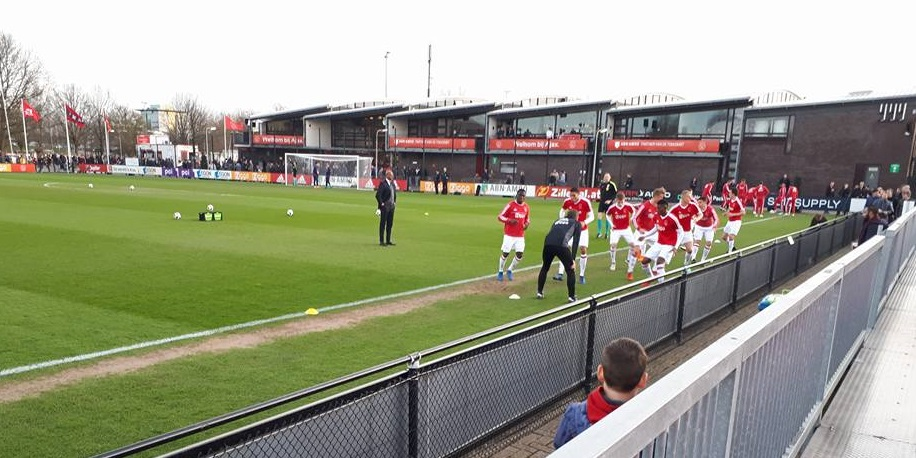
Jong Ajax against NEC in the Eerst divisie in 2018

Since 1992, Jong Ajax has competed in the Beloften Eredivisie, competing against other reserve teams such as Jong PSV, Jong Groningen or Jong AZ. They have won the Beloften Eredivisie title a record eight times, as well as the KNVB Reserve Cup three times, making them the most successful reserve squad in the Netherlands. By winning the Beloften Eredivisie title, Jong Ajax was able to qualify for the actual KNVB Cup, even advancing to the semi-finals on three occasions. Its best result in the Dutch Cup was under manager Jan Olde Riekerink in 2001–02, when a semi-final loss to Utrecht in a Penalty shoot-out after extra time, which saw Utrecht advance, and thus preventing an Ajax–Jong Ajax Dutch Cup final.

The 2013–14 season marked the Jupiler League debut of the Ajax reserves' squad, Jong Ajax. Previously playing in the Beloften Eredivisie (a separate league for reserve teams, not included in the Dutch professional or amateur league structure), players were allowed to move around freely between the reserve team and the first team during the season. This is no longer the case as Jong Ajax now registers and fields a separate squad from that of Ajax first team for the Eerste Divisie, the second tier of professional football in the Netherlands. Its home matches are played at Sportpark De Toekomst, except for the occasional match in the Johan Cruyff Arena. Now regarded a semi-professional team in its own respect, the only period in which players are able to move between squads are during the transfer windows, unless the player has made less than 15 appearances for the first team, then he is still eligible to appear in both first team and second team matches during the season. Furthermore, the team is not eligible for promotion to the Eredivisie or to participate in the KNVB Cup. Jong Ajax was joined in the Eerste Divisie by Jong Twente and Jong PSV, reserve teams who have also moved from the Beloften Eredivisie to the Eerste Divisie, in place of VV Katwijk, SC Veendam and AGOVV Apeldoorn, increasing the total number of teams in the Jupiler League from 18 to 20.

Ajax reserve squad Jong Ajax left the Beloften Eredivisie in 2013, having held a 21-year tenure in the reserves league, having also won the league title a record eight times (1994, 1996, 1998, 2001, 2002, 2004, 2005, 2009).

=== Women's team ===
Ajax Vrouwen (English: Ajax Women) is the women's team of Ajax, competing in the women's eredivisie, the highest level of women's football in the Netherlands. Founded on 18 May 2012, the women's team saw Ajax attracting many of the Netherlands top talents, with International players such as Anouk Hoogendijk, Daphne Koster and Petra Hogewoning joining the Amsterdam club in its maiden season in women's professional football. The team won its first piece of silverware when they defeated PSV/FC Eindhoven 2–1 in the final of the KNVB Women's Cup.

=== Amateur team ===
Ajax Amateurs, better known as Ajax Zaterdag, is a Dutch amateur football club founded 18 March 1900. It is the amateur team of the professional club AFC Ajax, playing its home matches at the Sportpark De Toekomst training grounds to a capacity of 5,000. The team was promoted from the Eerste Klasse to the Hoofdklasse ahead of the 2011–12 season, the league in which it is currently competing. The team has won the Eerste Klasse title twice, as well as the *KNVB District Cup West I on two occasions as well.

Furthermore, Ajax Zaterdag has also managed to qualify for the KNVB Cup on its own accord on three occasions, namely in 2004, 2005, 2008 and 2021. They even advanced to the second round, before bowing out to Vitesse on 24 September 2008.

== Other sports ==
=== Baseball ===
Ajax HVA (1922–1972) was the baseball team of Ajax founded in 1922, and competed as founding members of the Honkbal Hoofdklasse, the top flight of professional baseball in the Netherlands. Ajax won the national baseball title a total of four times (1924, 1928, 1942, 1948) before the club opted to no longer field a baseball team, and to focus solely on football in 1972. Ajax spent a total of 50 years at the top flight of Baseball in the Netherlands from 1922 to 1972. The dissolution of Ajax baseball club resulted in the players finding a new sponsor in a mustard manufacturing company called Luycks, while merging with the Diemen Giants to become the Luycks Giants, thus replacing both former clubs.

=== Esports ===
In 2016, Ajax launched an esports team, with Koen Weijland as the club's first signing, making its debut on the Global stage of professional gaming. They have since signed the likes of Dani Hagebeuk, Lev Vinken, Joey Calabro and Bob van Uden, the latter spent his first season on loan to the esports team of Japanese club Sagan Tosu.

== Affiliated clubs ==
The following clubs are currently affiliated with AFC Ajax:

- (Netherlands) Almere City (2005–present)
- (Spain) Barcelona (2007–present)
- (Brazil) Cruzeiro (2007–present)
- (China) Beijing Guoan (2007–present)
- (Brazil) Palmeiras (2010–present)
- (Slovakia) AS Trenčín (2012–present)
- (China) Guangzhou R&F (2017–present)
- (Japan) Sagan Tosu (2018–present)
- (United Arab Emirates) Sharjah FC (2020–present)
- (Australia) Sydney FC (2018–present)
- (Netherlands) Sparta Rotterdam (2019–present)
- (Netherlands) Various HETT-clubs (See main article)

The following clubs were affiliated with AFC Ajax in the past:

- (Belgium) Germinal Beerschot (1999–2003)
- (Ghana) Ashanti Goldfields (1999–2003)
- (United States) Ajax Orlando Prospects (2003–2007)
- (Netherlands) HFC Haarlem (2006–2010)
- (Netherlands) Volendam (2007–2010)
- (South Africa) Ajax Cape Town (1999–2020)

== Rivalries ==
As one of the traditional big three clubs in the Netherlands, Ajax have amassed a number of intense rivalries over the years. Listed below are the most significant of the rivalries involving Ajax.

=== Rivalry with Feyenoord ===
Feyenoord from Rotterdam is Ajax's archrival. Every year both clubs play the De Klassieker ("The Classic"), a match between the teams from the two largest cities of the Netherlands. Till the 1973/74-season, Ajax and Feyenoord were the only two clubs in the Netherlands who were able to clinch national titles, as well as achieve continental and even global success. From the 1974/75-season onwards, PSV (Eindhoven) and AZ (Alkmaar) started to compete with Ajax and Feyenoord. A meeting between the two clubs became the measure for who was truly the best club in the Netherlands. The Klassieker is the most famous of all the rivalries in the Netherlands and the matches are always sold out. The fixture is seen in the public eye as "the graceful and elegant football of Ajax, against the indomitable fighting spirit of Feyenoord"; the confidence of the capital city versus the blue collar mentality of Rotterdam. Matches are known for their tension and violence, both on and off the pitch. Over the years, several violent incidents have taken place involving rival supporters, leading to the current prohibition of away supporters in both stadiums. The lowest point was reached on 23 March 1997, when supporters of both clubs met on a field near Beverwijk, where Ajax-supporter Carlo Picornie was fatally injured, the incident is commonly referred to as the "Battle of Beverwijk".

=== Rivalry with PSV ===
PSV is also a rival of Ajax, but in terms of tension and rivalry, these matches are not as loaded as the duels with Feyenoord. The rivalry has existed for some time with PSV and stems from various causes, such as the different interpretations of whether current national and international successes of both clubs correlates and the supposed opposition between the Randstad and the province. The matches between these two teams is commonly referred to as "De Topper" ("The Topper"), and involves the two most trophy-laden sides in Dutch football and is essentially a clash of two competing schools of thought in Dutch football. Historically, PSV compete with a workmanlike ethic, preferring a more robust 4–3–1–2 or 4–2–3–1, typically shunning the frivolous 4–3–3 approach favoured in Amsterdam. While Rinus Michels and Johan Cruyff helped to innovate Total Football in the sixties and seventies, a different philosophy was honed in Eindhoven by Kees Rijvers and Guus Hiddink in the late 1970s and '80s. This in turn has created one of the more philosophical rivalries in football, an ideological battleground, which is gradually becoming as heated and intense as the matches Ajax and Feyenoord partake in.

=== Rivalry with AZ ===
A more recent rivalry has developed with AZ from nearby Alkmaar. Since both Ajax and AZ are situated in North Holland province, the fixture is often referred to as "De Noord-Hollandse derby" ("The North Holland derby"). Although the clubs first met in the 1960s, the rivalry intensified when AZ won the Dutch championship in 2009. The derby has since become a key clash in the Dutch football season, often with high stakes and impact on the league. Although many Ajax supporters regard AZ as their "little brother", it remains a competitive and emotionally charged fixture. The supporters have clashed several times since 2009. In December 2024, for example, Ajax supporters attacked an AZ pub in Alkmaar during a derby match. A notable incident occurred on 21 December 2011 during a KNVB Cup match. An Ajax supporter ran onto the pitch and attacked AZ goalkeeper Esteban Alvarado, who defended himself by kicking the pitch invader twice and received a straight red card from referee Bas Nijhuis. AZ coach Gertjan Verbeek took his players off the pitch in protest, following which the match was definitively abandoned. The sides furthermore compete for staff and youth prospects in the North Holland region. When technical director Martin van Geel left AZ for Ajax in 2006, AZ director Dirk Scheringa banned him from the club's stadium.

=== Rivalries with other clubs ===
Ajax have several other rivalries, although in most cases the sentiment is mostly felt by the opposition and is more directed towards Ajax, with one of them being Utrecht. Although the rivalry is more felt on the Utrecht side than with Ajax, matchups between the two sides are often quite intense. Both teams have fanatic supporters, and clashes off the pitch are more often the rule than the exception. The same goes for ADO Den Haag, with both supporter groups often getting in conflicts, when ADO-Hooligans set fire to the supporters home of Ajax, and Ajax hooligans subsequently broke into the supporters home of ADO, tensions between the two clubs rose. In 2006, supporters from both clubs were banned from attending away matches for five years due to frequent violent outbreaks and clashes.

Further teams who share a rivalry with Ajax include Twente, Vitesse and Groningen. Past rivalries include local Amsterdam derbies between Ajax and clubs such as Blauw-Wit, DWS and De Volewijckers (which later merged to become FC Amsterdam in 1972). However, the tension between the local sides lessened as the division of the clubs through playing in different leagues over time became greater. Years of not competing in the same league resulted in less frequent match-ups, until tensions finally settled between the Amsterdam clubs. The last Amsterdam derby to take place in an official league match was when Ajax defeated FC Amsterdam 5–1 on 19 March 1978.

== Supporters ==
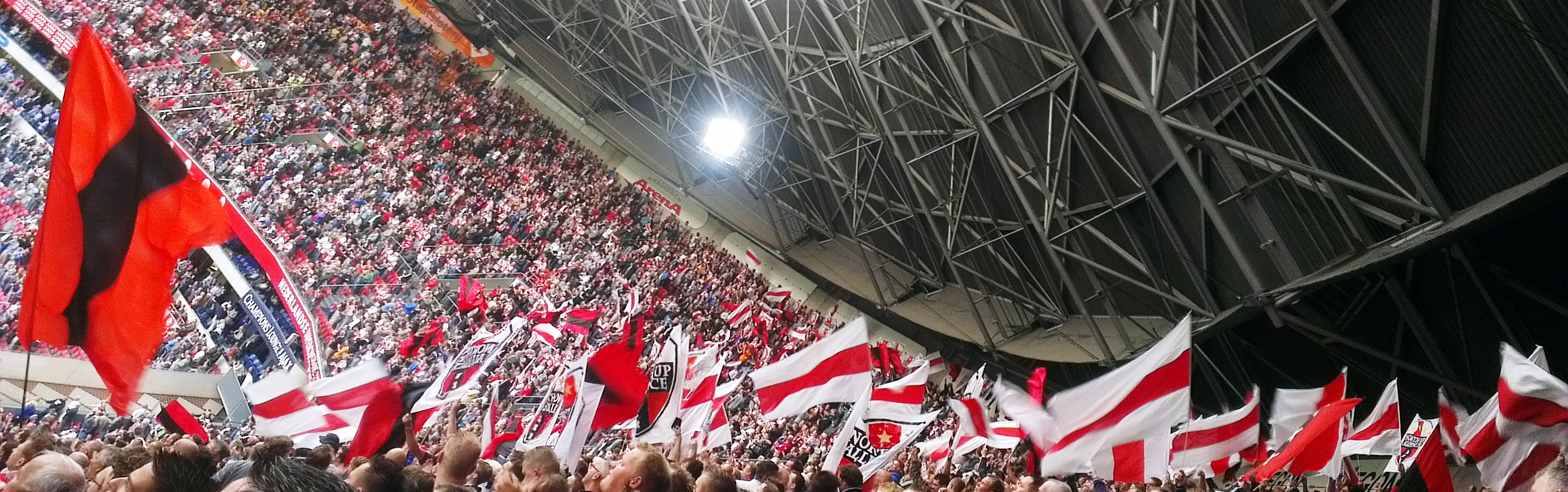
Ajax supporters

Ajax is known for having fanatic core supporter-groups, of which F-Side and VAK410 are the most famous. The F-Side was founded on 3 October 1976, and is situated right behind the goal in the Johan Cruyff Arena, on the southern end of the stadium in rows 125–129. Its name is derived from the group's former location on the F-side of the old De Meer Stadion. The F-side supporters are responsible for a big part of the atmosphere in the stadium, and are also known for rioting during and after matches. If in any match Ajax should win the coin toss, the second half of the match Ajax always play towards the south-end of the stadium. VAK410 (English: Row 410) was founded in 2001 and is situated in the Zuidhoek (South corner) of the stadium on the upper ring in rows 424–425. The group was originally situated on the North-West side of the stadium in row 410, from where it derives its name, until relocating to their current place in the stands in 2008. Members of VAK410 are known to perform various stunts, which include massive banners, to enhance the atmosphere in the stadium. Neither F-Side or VAK410 have seats in their sections of the stadium, and both groups stand for the duration of the match.

Through the official Football Top 20 of Dutch sports research group SPORT+MARKT, it was revealed in 2010 that Ajax had approximately 7.1 million supporters throughout Europe. This is significantly more than rivals Feyenoord and PSV (each 1.6 and 1.3 million, respectively), which puts Ajax as the club with the 15th-most supporters across Europe. The study also revealed that approximately 39% of the Netherlands were Ajax supporters. Not only does Ajax have many supporters, but several fans attend their matches in European competition, with an average attendance of 48,677 spectators for every international match Ajax played, putting the team at 12th place in Europe for highest attendance, ahead of high-profile clubs such as Milan and Chelsea. It is noteworthy that not all stadiums share the capacity of the Johan Cruyff Arena.

=== Supporters clubs ===
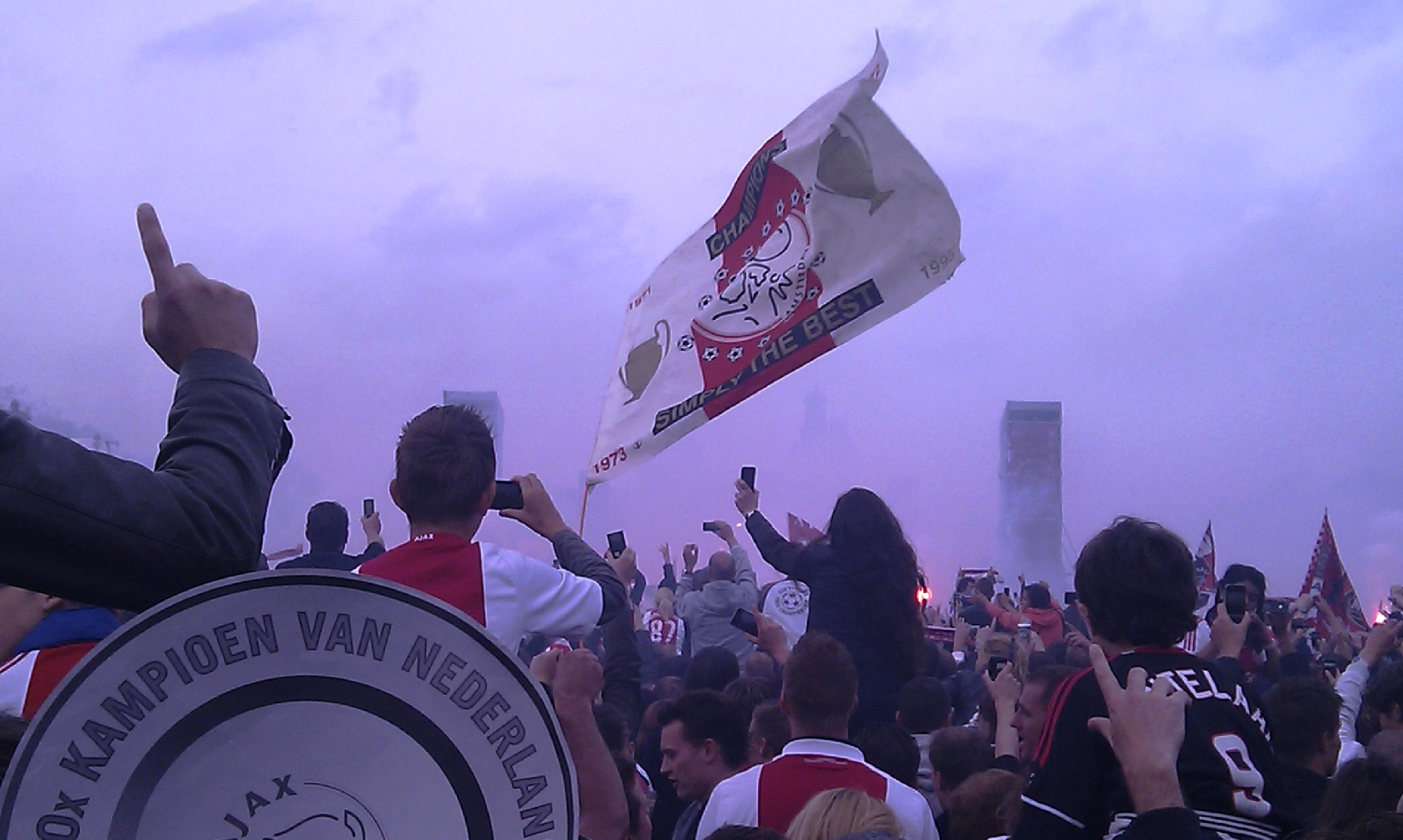
Ajax supporters celebrating the club's 30th Dutch national championship in 2011

The Supporters Club Ajax (Dutch: Supportersvereniging Ajax) is officially the largest supporters club in the Netherlands with 94,000 members. Founded on 7 May 1992, the supporters club organize big monthly events throughout the Netherlands, and particularly around the official Ajax Open Training Day, which attracts thousands of supporters each year. Furthermore, the supporters group is responsible for the Ajax Life website, as well as the fanzine which is issued 20 times a year.

In 2006, the AFCA Supportersclub was introduced as the club's second official supporters' association, through the merger of the Onafhankelijke Fanclub Ajax (OFA) and the Ajax Supporters Delegatie (ASD). The AFCA Supportersclub has a reported 42,000 members, as well as a former member on the Board of Administration of Ajax, in Ronald Pieloor.

The third official supporters club is the Ajax Business Associates (ABA). Founded in 1991 the ABA is the Business club of Ajax. Members occupy the skyboxes in the Stadium and can make use of the clubs' amenities and luxury suites including the ABA club and lounge. The ABA is also responsible for hosting the annual Ajax Business Golf Trophy, an amateur golf tournament where several active and former Ajax players, as well as prominent people and members of the ABA, participate.

=== Average attendance ===
This graph displays the average attendance for home matches of Ajax from 1988 to 2018, whereby the difference in capacity of the De Meer Stadion and the Johan Cruyff Arena (opened in 1996) is clearly visible.

11926	16585	22382	18994	21488	22742	23600	21922	48069	48423	41275	40711	36347	35584	47571	48996	49353	46912	48562	49089	49014	48681	47316	50147	50490	50907	49403	49483	49620	49711
88/89	89/90	90/91	91/92	92/93	93/94	94/95	95/96	96/97	97/98	98/99	99/00	00/01	01/02	02/03	03/04	04/05	05/06	06/07	07/08	08/09	09/10	10/11	11/12	12/13	13/14	14/15	15/16	16/17	17/18

=== Mascot ===
- Lucky Lynx, is the official team mascot. (2000–present)

== Jewish connection ==
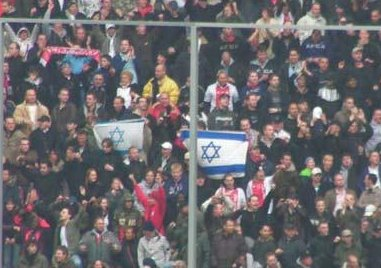
Supporters with Israeli flags in 2008

Historically, Ajax was popularly seen as having "Jewish roots". While it had fewer Jewish players than WV-HEDW, Ajax has had a Jewish image since the 1930s when the home stadium was located next to a Jewish neighbourhood of Amsterdam-Oost and opponents saw many supporters walking through the Nieuwmarkt/Waterloopleinbuurt (de Jodenhoek—the "Jews' corner") to get to the stadium. The city of Amsterdam was historically referred to as a Mokum city, Mokum (מקום) being the Yiddish word for "place" or "safe haven", though 75% of the Jewish citizens were killed during the Holocaust. As antisemitic chants and name calling developed and intensified at the old De Meer Stadion from frustrated supporters of opposing clubs, Ajax fans (few of whom are Jewish) responded by embracing Ajax's "Jewish" identity: calling themselves "super Jews", chanting "Jews, Jews" ("Joden, Joden") at games, and adopting Jewish symbols such as the Star of David and the Israeli flag, similar to what supporters of the Premier League club Tottenham Hotspur did with the term "yid".

This Jewish imagery eventually became a central part of Ajax fans' culture. At one point, ringtones of "Hava Nagila", a Hebrew folk song, could be downloaded from the club's official website. Beginning in the 1980s, fans of Ajax's rivals escalated their antisemitic rhetoric, chanting slogans like "Jews to the gas" ("Joden joden aan het gas"), hissing to imitate the flow of gas, giving Nazi salutes, and other things. The eventual result was that many genuinely Jewish Ajax fans stopped going to games.

In the 2000s, the club began trying to persuade fans to drop its Jewish image. In 2013, a documentary titled Superjews was released by NTR and Viewpoint Productions which premiered at the International Documentary Film Festival Amsterdam (IDFA). The film was directed by Nirit Peled, an Israeli living in Amsterdam, and an independent film maker who offers a very personal view into the game, the lore of Ajax and its relation to Judaism from both the supporters as well as from a Jewish perspective.

Before and after a UEFA Europa League game between Israeli team Maccabi Tel Aviv and Ajax on 7 November 2024 in the Johan Cruyff Arena, tensions surrounding the Gaza war erupted into violence.

== Players ==
=== Current squad ===
As of 16 September 2026

Note: Flags indicate national team as defined under FIFA eligibility rules; some limited exceptions apply. Players may hold more than one non-FIFA nationality.

No.	Pos.	Nation	Player
1	GK	GER	Marc-André ter Stegen (on loan from Barcelona)
2	DF	BRA	Lucas Rosa
3	DF	DEN	Anton Gaaei
4	MF	MAR	Sofyan Amrabat
5	DF	NED	Owen Wijndal
6	DF	GER	Thilo Kehrer (on loan from Monaco)
7	FW	CIV	Simon Adingra (on loan from Sunderland)
8	MF	GER	Julian Brandt
9	FW	DEN	Kasper Dolberg
10	MF	ISR	Oscar Gloukh
11	MF	UKR	Viktor Tsyhankov
12	DF	BRA	Caio Henrique
15	DF	NED	Youri Baas
17	DF	NED	Daley Blind

No.	Pos.	Nation	Player
18	MF	NED	Davy Klaassen (captain)
20	FW	NOR	Oliver Edvardsen
21	DF	ESP	Jofre Torrents
22	GK	NED	Joeri Heerkens
23	FW	NED	Steven Berghuis (vice-captain)
24	MF	COD	Jorthy Mokio
26	GK	IDN	Maarten Paes
28	MF	MLI	Yves Bissouma
30	DF	NED	Aaron Bouwman
36	DF	NED	Dies Janse
38	FW	BRA	Marcos Leonardo
43	MF	MAR	Rayane Bounida
68	MF	MAR	Abdellah Ouazane
99	FW	NGR	Tolu Arokodare (on loan from Wolverhampton Wanderers)

=== Youth players in use ===
Note: Flags indicate national team as defined under FIFA eligibility rules; some limited exceptions apply. Players may hold more than one non-FIFA nationality.

No.	Pos.	Nation	Player
67	MF	NED	Mohamed Abdalla

=== Out on loan ===
Note: Flags indicate national team as defined under FIFA eligibility rules; some limited exceptions apply. Players may hold more than one non-FIFA nationality.

No.	Pos.	Nation	Player
—	DF	ARG	Gastón Ávila (at Rosario Central until 31 December 2026)
—	DF	CRO	Josip Šutalo (at Lazio until 30 June 2027)
—	MF	NED	Youri Regeer (at Werder Bremen until 30 June 2027)

No.	Pos.	Nation	Player
—	FW	ARG	Maher Carrizo (at Copenhagen until 30 June 2027)
—	FW	NED	Don-Angelo Konadu (at Lommel until 30 June 2027)

==== Retired numbers ====
The iconic number 14, retired in 2007 to honor Johan Cruyff

- 14 – (Netherlands) Johan Cruyff (Forward, 1964–73, 1981–83). Number retired on 25 April 2007 at Cruyff's 60th birthday celebration match.

(Note: Number 34 has not been reissued since Abdelhak Nouri (who played for Ajax from 2015 to 2017) suffered extreme cardiac arrhythmia in a friendly match against Werder Bremen, but the number is not officially retired.)

=== Youth/reserves squad ===
For the reserve squad of Ajax see: Jong Ajax.

== Board and staff ==
=== Current board ===
Executive Board

- Chairman: (Netherlands) Ernst Boekhorst
  - Board members: 5 – (Netherlands) John Busink, (Netherlands) Marjon Eijlers, (Netherlands) Giovanni Fränkel, (Netherlands) René Zegerius, (Netherlands) Christian Visser.

Board of Directors

- Chief executive officer: (Netherlands) Menno Geelen
- Chief financial officer: (Netherlands) Baboeram Panday
- Chief commercial officer: (Netherlands) Cas Biesta
- Technical Director: (Netherlands) Jordi Cruyff

Supervisory Board

- Chairman: (Netherlands) Lesley Bamberger
  - Board members: 5 – (Netherlands) Edo Ophof, (Netherlands) Duncan Stutterheim, (Netherlands) Dirk Anbeek, (Netherlands) Anita Coronel, (Netherlands) Marry de Gaay Fortman

=== Current staff ===
Coaching staff

- Head coach: (Spain) Míchel
- Assistant coaches: (Spain) Alberto Garrido Martinez, (Spain) Juanvi Peinado
- Goalkeeping coach: (Spain) Juan Carlos Balaguer Zamora, (Netherlands) Mike van Houten
- Performance coach: (Spain) David Porcel, (Spain) Nestor Salmeron
- Video analyst: (Spain) Pedro Serna (Netherlands) Pieter Tosch, (Netherlands) Rick Drijsen

Medical staff

- Head physio: (Netherlands) Maarten Gozeling
- Club doctor: (Netherlands) Niels Wijne
- Physiotherapist: (Netherlands) Robyn Van Vliet

Accompanying staff

- Team manager: (Netherlands) Jan Siemerink
- Press officer: (Netherlands) Miel Brinkhuis

=== List of Ajax chairmen ===
- (Netherlands) Floris Stempel (1900–08)
- (Netherlands) Chris Holst (1908–10)
- (Netherlands) Han Dade (1910–12)
- (Netherlands) Chris Holst (1912–13)
- (Netherlands) Willem Egeman (1913–25)
- (Netherlands) Frans Schoevaart (1925–32)
- (Netherlands) Marius Koolhaas (1932–56)
- (Netherlands) Wim Volkers (1956–58)
- (Netherlands) Jan Melchers (1958–64)
- (Netherlands) Jaap van Praag (1964–78)
- (Netherlands) Ton Harmsen (1978–88)
- (Netherlands) Michael van Praag (1989–2003)
- (Netherlands) John Jaakke (2003–08)
- (Netherlands) Uri Coronel (2008–11)
- (Netherlands) Hennie Henrichs (2011–20)
- (Netherlands) Frank Eijken (2020–2023)
- (Netherlands) Ernst Boekhorst (2023–present)

=== List of Ajax coaches ===
- (Ireland) Jack Kirwan (1910–15)
- (England) Jack Reynolds (1915–25)
- (England) Harold Rose (1925–26)
- (England) Stanley Castle (1926–28)
- (England) Jack Reynolds (1928–40)
- (Hungary) Vilmos Halpern (1940–41)
- (Netherlands) Wim Volkers (1941–42)
- (Netherlands) Dolf van Kol (1942–45)
- (England) Jack Reynolds (1945–47)
- (England) Robert Smith (1947–48)
- (England) Walter Crook (1948–50)
- (Scotland) Robert Thomson (1950–52)
- (Netherlands) Karel Kaufman (1952–53)
- (England) Walter Crook (1953–54)
- (Austria) Karl Humenberger (1954–59)
- (England) Vic Buckingham (1959–61)
- (England) Keith Spurgeon (1961–62)
- (Austria) Joseph Gruber (1962–63)
- (England) Jack Rowley (1963–64)
- (England) Vic Buckingham (1964–65)
- (Netherlands) Rinus Michels (1965–71)
- (Romania) Ștefan Kovács (1971–73)
- (Netherlands) George Knobel (1973–74)
- (Netherlands) Bobby Haarms (1974, interim)
- (Netherlands) Hans Kraay (1974–75)
- (Netherlands) Jan van Daal (1975, interim)
- (Netherlands) Rinus Michels (1975–76)
- (Socialist Federal Republic of Yugoslavia) Tomislav Ivić (1976–78)
- (Netherlands) Cor Brom (1978–79)
- (Netherlands) Leo Beenhakker (1979–81)
- (Netherlands) Aad de Mos (1981, interim)
- (West Germany) Kurt Linder (1981–82)
- (Netherlands) Aad de Mos (1982–85)
- (Luxembourg) Antoine Kohn, (Netherlands) Tonny Bruins Slot and (Netherlands) Cor van der Hart (1985, interim)
- (Netherlands) Johan Cruyff (1985–88)
- (West Germany) Kurt Linder (1988)
- (Luxembourg) Antoine Kohn, (Netherlands) Bobby Haarms and (Netherlands) Barry Hulshoff (1988–89, interim)
- (Netherlands) Leo Beenhakker (1989–91)
- (Netherlands) Louis van Gaal (1991–97)
- (Denmark) Morten Olsen (1997–99)
- (Netherlands) Jan Wouters (1999–2000)
- (Netherlands) Hans Westerhof (2000, interim)
- (Netherlands) Co Adriaanse (2000–01)
- (Netherlands) Ronald Koeman (2001–05)
- (Netherlands) Ruud Krol (2005, interim)
- (Netherlands) Danny Blind (2005–06)
- (Netherlands) Henk ten Cate (2006–07)
- (Netherlands) Adrie Koster (2007–08, interim)
- (Netherlands) Marco van Basten (2008–09)
- (Netherlands) John van 't Schip (2009, interim)
- (Netherlands) Martin Jol (2009–10)
- (Netherlands) Frank de Boer (2010–16)
- (Netherlands) Peter Bosz (2016–17)
- (Netherlands) Marcel Keizer (2017)
- (Netherlands) Michael Reiziger (2017, interim)
- (Netherlands) Erik ten Hag (2017–2022)
- (Netherlands) Alfred Schreuder (2022–2023)
- (Netherlands) John Heitinga (2023, interim)
- (Netherlands) Maurice Steijn (2023)
- (Netherlands) Hedwiges Maduro (2023, interim)
- (Netherlands) John van 't Schip (2023–2024, interim)
- (Italy) Francesco Farioli (2024–2025)
- (Netherlands) John Heitinga (2025)
- (Netherlands) Fred Grim (2025–2026, interim)
- (Spain) Óscar García (2026, interim)
- (Spain) Míchel (2026–)

== Honours ==
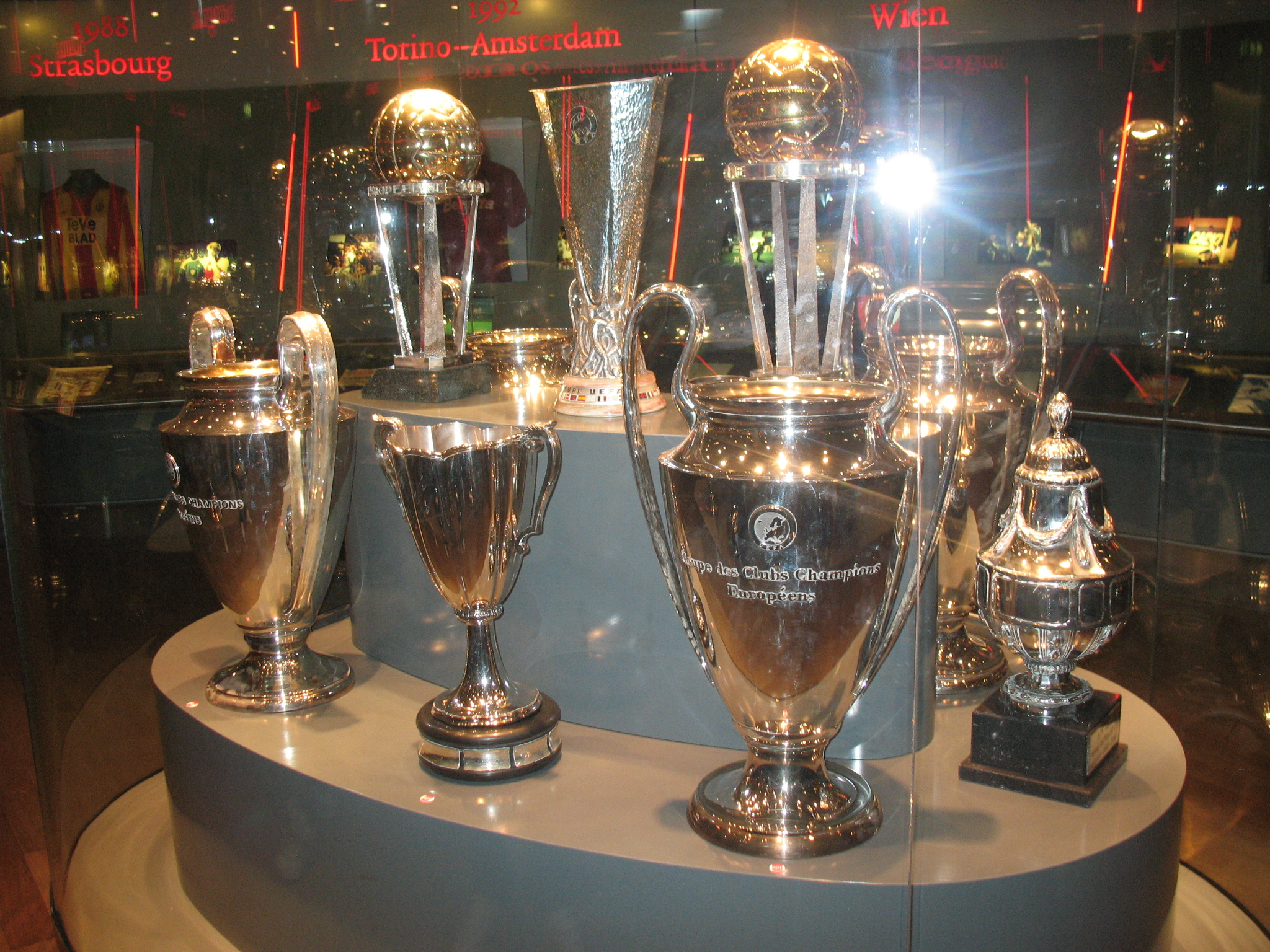
Several of Ajax' international trophies

Type	Competition	Titles	Seasons
Domestic	Eredivisie	36	1917–18, 1918–19, 1930–31, 1931–32, 1933–34, 1936–37, 1938–39, 1946–47, 1956–57, 1959–60, 1965–66, 1966–67, 1967–68, 1969–70, 1971–72, 1972–73, 1976–77, 1978–79, 1979–80, 1981–82, 1982–83, 1984–85, 1989–90, 1993–94, 1994–95, 1995–96, 1997–98, 2001–02, 2003–04, 2010–11, 2011–12, 2012–13, 2013–14, 2018–19, 2020–21, 2021–22
Domestic	KNVB Cup	20	1916–17, 1942–43, 1960–61, 1966–67, 1969-70, 1970–71, 1971–72, 1978–79, 1982–83, 1985–86, 1986–87, 1992–93, 1997–98, 1998–99, 2001–02, 2005–06, 2006–07, 2009–10, 2018–19, 2020–21
Domestic	Johan Cruyff Shield	9	1993, 1994, 1995, 2002, 2005, 2006, 2007, 2013, 2019
Continental	UEFA Champions League	4	1970–71, 1971–72, 1972–73, 1994–95
Continental	UEFA Europa League	1	1991–92
Continental	UEFA Cup Winners' Cup	1	1986–87
Continental	UEFA Super Cup (Note: Ajax also won in 1972, however UEFA only sanctioned the UEFA Super Cup for the first time in 1973 so the 1972 edition was an unofficial one. Played against Rangers, winners of the 1971–72 European Cup Winners' Cup, it went ahead as 'a celebration of the Centenary of Rangers F.C.' (see below) because Rangers was serving a one-year ban at the time, imposed by UEFA for the misbehaviour of its fans. That victory meant Ajax had won every tournament (5 in total) they entered that year, a feat Celtic achieved in 1967 (with 6 trophies), Barcelona in 2009 (6 trophies), and Bayern in 2020 (also 6 trophies).)	2	1973, 1995
Worldwide	Intercontinental Cup	2	1972, 1995

- record
- ^{s} shared record

=== Other trophies ===
Ajax have won numerous friendly tournaments, unsanctioned by UEFA or FIFA, including the Amsterdam Tournament, Bruges Matins Trophy, Trofeo Santiago Bernabéu, Eusébio Cup, Ted Bates Trophy, Jalkapalloturnaus and Chippie Polar Cup (for a complete list, see: list of AFC Ajax honours).

=== Club awards ===
- World Soccer World Team of the Year : 1

1995

- France Football European Team of the Year : 4

1969, 1971, 1972, 1973

- Dutch Sports Team of the Year : 5

1968, 1969, 1972, 1987, 1995

- Sports Team of the Year : 1

1990

- IFFHS The World's Club Team of the Year : 1

1992

- Dick van Rijn Trophy : 1

1995

- Amsterdam Sportsteam of the year: 3

2011, 2013, 2014

- ING Fair Play Award : 2

2013, 2014

- Fair Play Cup : 1

1995

- FIFA Club of the Century : shared 5th place

20th Century

- kicker Sportmagazin Club of the Century: 2nd place

20th Century

- Best Dutch club after 50 years of professional football : 1

2004

- Football shirt of the Year : Ajax away shirt by adidas

2013–14

- The Four-Four-Two Greatest Club Side Ever : Ajax (1965–1973)

2013

- VVCS Best Pitch of the Year : 1

2012

== Honorary club members ==
Ajax have a total of 50 honorary club members, from people who have been invested within the club's administrative engagements, to committed players who have excelled in the athletic department. Of those 50 members 41 have since died. Nine members still remain, including Louis van Gaal. He was made honorary member in 2024.

- (Netherlands) Hennie Henrichs
- (Netherlands) Arie van Os
- (Netherlands) Michael van Praag
- (Netherlands) Rob Been sr.
- (Netherlands) Sjaak Swart
- (Netherlands) Hans Bijvank
- (Netherlands) Leo van Wijk
- (Netherlands) Jan Buskermolen
- (Netherlands) Louis van Gaal

The remaining 41 honorary members who have since died:

- (Netherlands) Floris Stempel
- (Netherlands) Han Dade
- (Netherlands) Chris Holst
- (Netherlands) L.W. van Fliet
- (Netherlands) K.W.F. van der Lee
- (Netherlands) Henk Alofs
- (Netherlands) Frans Schoevaart
- (Netherlands) Jan Grootmeijer
- (Netherlands) J. Oudheusden
- (Netherlands) Willem Egeman
- (Netherlands) Jan Schoevaart
- (Netherlands) Marius Koolhaas
- (Netherlands) Jordanus Roodenburgh
- (Netherlands) Theo Brokmann
- (Netherlands) F.H.W. de Bruijn
- (Netherlands) Jan de Boer
- (Netherlands) Frans Couton
- (Netherlands) A.L. Desmit
- (Netherlands) Wim Anderiesen
- (Netherlands) Wim Volkers
- (Netherlands) Jan Elzenga
- (Netherlands) Roef Vunderink
- (Netherlands) Kick Geudeker
- (Netherlands) G. de Jongh
- (England) Jack Reynolds
- (Netherlands) Ferry Dukker
- (Netherlands) Arie de Wit
- (Netherlands) W.F.C. Bruijnesteijn
- (Netherlands) Jan Westrik
- (Netherlands) Jaap van Praag
- (Netherlands) Henk Hordijk
- (Netherlands) M.J.W. Middendorp
- (Netherlands) Rinus Michels
- (Netherlands) Henk Timman
- (Netherlands) Jan Potharst
- (Netherlands) Bobby Haarms
- (Netherlands) André Kraan
- (Netherlands) Willem Schoevaart
- (Netherlands) Johan Cruyff
- (Netherlands) Uri Coronel
- (Netherlands) Tijn Middendorp

== Results ==
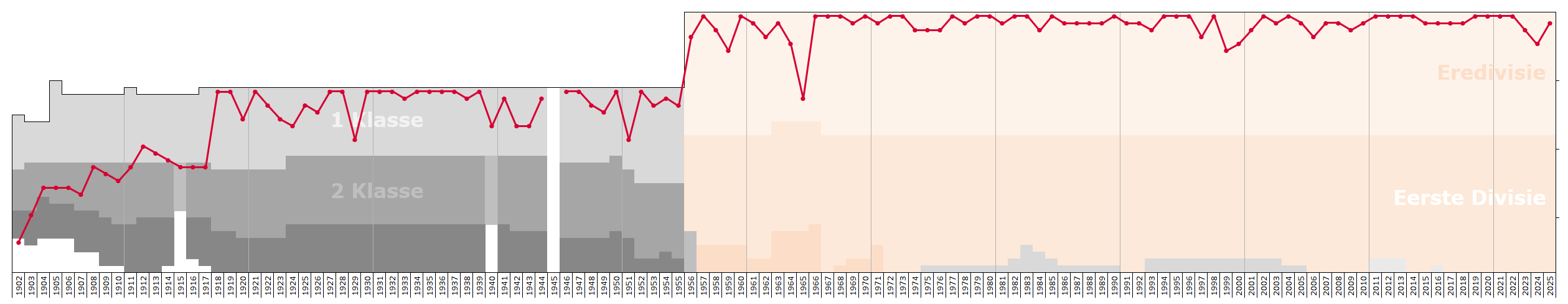
Historical chart of league performance

=== Domestic results ===
Below is a table with Ajax's domestic results since the introduction of the Eredivisie in 1956.

Domestic results since 1956
Domestic league	League result	Qualification to	KNVB Cup season	Cup result
2024–25 Eredivisie	2nd	Champions League	2024–25	round of 16
2023–24 Eredivisie	5th	Europa League (Q2)	2023–24	second round
2022–23 Eredivisie	3rd	Europa League (Q4)	2022–23	final
2021–22 Eredivisie	1st	Champions League	2021–22	final
2020–21 Eredivisie	1st	Champions League	2020–21	winners
2019–20 Eredivisie	1st (no title awarded)	Champions League	2019–20	semi-final
2018–19 Eredivisie	1st	Champions League	2018–19	winners
2017–18 Eredivisie	2nd	Champions League (Q2)	2017–18	round of 16
2016–17 Eredivisie	2nd	Champions League (Q3)	2016–17	third round
2015–16 Eredivisie	2nd	Champions League (Q3)	2015–16	third round
2014–15 Eredivisie	2nd	Champions League (Q3)	2014–15	round of 16
2013–14 Eredivisie	1st	Champions League	2013–14	final
2012–13 Eredivisie	1st	Champions League	2012–13	semi-final
2011–12 Eredivisie	1st	Champions League	2011–12	fourth round
2010–11 Eredivisie	1st	Champions League	2010–11	final
2009–10 Eredivisie	2nd	Champions League (Q2)	2009–10	winners
2008–09 Eredivisie	3rd	Europa League (Q4)	2008–09	third round
2007–08 Eredivisie	2nd	UEFA Cup (after losing CL-play-offs)	2007–08	round of 16
2006–07 Eredivisie	2nd	Champions League (winning CL-play-offs) (Q3)	2006–07	winners
2005–06 Eredivisie	4th	Champions League (winning CL-play-offs) (Q3)	2005–06	winners
2004–05 Eredivisie	2nd	Champions League (Q3)	2004–05	semi-final
2003–04 Eredivisie	1st	Champions League	2003–04	round of 16
2002–03 Eredivisie	2nd	Champions League (Q3)	2002–03	semi-final
2001–02 Eredivisie	1st	Champions League	2001–02	winners
2000–01 Eredivisie	3rd	Champions League (Q3)	2000–01	round of 16
1999–2000 Eredivisie	5th	UEFA Cup	1999–2000	round of 16
1998–99 Eredivisie	6th	UEFA Cup	1998–99	winners
1997–98 Eredivisie	1st	Champions League	1997–98	winners
1996–97 Eredivisie	4th	UEFA Cup	1996–97	second round
1995–96 Eredivisie	1st	Champions League	1995–96	round of 16
1994–95 Eredivisie	1st	Champions League	1994–95	quarter final
1993–94 Eredivisie	1st	Champions League	1993–94	semi-final
1992–93 Eredivisie	3rd	Cup Winners' Cup	1992–93	winners
1991–92 Eredivisie	2nd	UEFA Cup	1991–92	quarter final
1990–91 Eredivisie	2nd	UEFA Cup	1990–91	quarter final
1989–90 Eredivisie	1st	DSQ	1989–90	semi-final
1988–89 Eredivisie	2nd	UEFA Cup	1988–89	quarter final
1987–88 Eredivisie	2nd	UEFA Cup	1987–88	second round
1986–87 Eredivisie	2nd	Cup Winners' Cup	1986–87	winners
1985–86 Eredivisie	2nd	Cup Winners' Cup	1985–86	winners
1984–85 Eredivisie	1st	European Cup	1984–85	round of 16
1983–84 Eredivisie	3rd	UEFA Cup	1983–84	round of 16
1982–83 Eredivisie	1st	European Cup	1982–83	winners
1981–82 Eredivisie	1st	European Cup	1981–82	round of 16
1980–81 Eredivisie	2nd	Cup Winners' Cup	1980–81	final
1979–80 Eredivisie	1st	European Cup	1979–80	final
1978–79 Eredivisie	1st	European Cup	1978–79	winners
1977–78 Eredivisie	2nd	UEFA Cup	1977–78	final
1976–77 Eredivisie	1st	European Cup	1976–77	second round
1975–76 Eredivisie	3rd	UEFA Cup	1975–76	quarter final
1974–75 Eredivisie	3rd	UEFA Cup	1974–75	round of 16
1973–74 Eredivisie	3rd	UEFA Cup	1973–74	semi-final
1972–73 Eredivisie	1st	European Cup (R2)	1972–73	second round
1971–72 Eredivisie	1st	European Cup (R2)	1971–72	winners
1970–71 Eredivisie	2nd	European Cup	1970–71	winners
1969–70 Eredivisie	1st	European Cup	1969–70	winners
1968–69 Eredivisie	2nd	Inter-Cities Fairs Cup	1968–69	round of 16
1967–68 Eredivisie	1st	European Cup	1967–68	final
1966–67 Eredivisie	1st	European Cup	1966–67	winners
1965–66 Eredivisie	1st	European Cup	1965–66	quarter final
1964–65 Eredivisie	13th	–	1964–65	first round
1963–64 Eredivisie	5th	–	1963–64	semi-final
1962–63 Eredivisie	2nd	–	1962–63	round of 16
1961–62 Eredivisie	4th	–	1961–62	?
1960–61 Eredivisie	2nd	–	1960–61	winners
1959–60 Eredivisie	1st	European Cup	not held	not held
1958–59 Eredivisie	6th	–	1958–59	?
1957–58 Eredivisie	3rd	–	1957–58	?
1956–57 Eredivisie	1st	European Cup	1956–57	?

== Team records ==
- Most league appearances: 463 – Sjaak Swart
- Most goals scored: 273 – Piet van Reenen
- Most goals scored in a season: 41 – Henk Groot
- First Ajax player to receive an International cap: Gerard Fortgens for the Netherlands in 1911
- First Ajax player to score a goal for the national team: Theo Brokmann for the Netherlands in 1919

== Club van 100 ==
The Club van 100 is the official list of football players who have appeared in one hundred or more official matches for AFC Ajax. The club currently has a total of over 150 members. The record for league appearances is held by Mr. Ajax himself Sjaak Swart, who appeared in 463 league matches for Ajax. There is a beneficiary team called Lucky Ajax, which was initiated by Sjaak Swart. Lucky Ajax participate in at least one match a year, usually in the name of charity, and commonly at football ceremonies to bid farewell to retiring players. One of the prerequisites for playing on Lucky Ajax, which is invitational only, is that you are a member of the Club van 100, having made at least 100 official match appearances for Ajax in the first team of the club.

== Lucky Ajax ==
Lucky Ajax is a beneficiary team that was initiated by Sjaak Swart in the seventies, competing in at least one match a year, usually in the name of charity and/or to bid farewell to retiring former Ajax players. The team is made up of various members of the Club van 100 of Ajax who will come out of retirement for this match to face the Ajax squad that is current of that year. Past participants have included Barry Hulshoff, Sonny Silooy, Simon Tahamata, Ronald Koeman, Tscheu La Ling, Gerrie Mühren, John van 't Schip, Brian Roy, Stanley Menzo, Peter van Vossen and Fred Grim. The name Lucky Ajax is derived from the famous "Lucky Ajax" nickname from how people used to refer to the club when Ajax would either win a match by chance, by a decision of a referee, or by coincidence such as was said to be the case during the infamous Mistwedstrijd ("Fog Match").

== Former captains ==
Tenure	Player
1964–1967	(Netherlands) Frits Soetekouw
1967–1970	(Netherlands) Gert Bals
1970–1971	(Socialist Federal Republic of Yugoslavia) Velibor Vasović
1971–1972	(Netherlands) Piet Keizer
1972–1973	(Netherlands) Johan Cruyff
1973–1974	(Netherlands) Piet Keizer
1974–1980	(Netherlands) Ruud Krol
1980–1981	(Denmark) Frank Arnesen
1981–1983	(Denmark) Søren Lerby
1983–1985	(Netherlands) Dick Schoenaker
1985	(Netherlands) Frank Rijkaard
1985–1987	(Netherlands) Marco van Basten
1987–1990	(Netherlands) John van 't Schip
1990–1999	(Netherlands) Danny Blind
1999–2001	(Netherlands) Aron Winter
2001–2003	(Romania) Cristian Chivu
2003–2004	(Finland) Jari Litmanen
2004–2005	(Netherlands) Rafael Van der Vaart
2005–2006	(Czech Republic) Tomáš Galásek
2006–2007	(Netherlands) Jaap Stam
2007–2009	(Netherlands) Klaas-Jan Huntelaar
2009	(Belgium) Thomas Vermaelen
2009–2011	(Uruguay) Luis Suárez
2011	(Netherlands) Maarten Stekelenburg
2011–2012	(Belgium) Jan Vertonghen
2012–2014	(Netherlands) Siem de Jong
2014–2015	(Finland) Niklas Moisander
2015–2017	(Netherlands) Davy Klaassen
2017–2018	(Netherlands) Joël Veltman
2018–2019	(Netherlands) Matthijs de Ligt
2019–2023	(Serbia) Dušan Tadić
2023–2024	(Netherlands) Steven Bergwijn
2024–2025	(England) Jordan Henderson
2025–	(Netherlands) Davy Klaassen

== Team tournaments ==
=== Amsterdam Tournament ===
Established in 1975 as the Amsterdam 700 Tournament to celebrate 700 years of history in the city. The tournament was hosted annually each summer by Ajax until 1992, when the last edition of the original tournament was played. It returned in 1999 with the backing of the International Event Partnership (IEP). Four teams participated in the competition, played in a league format since 1986. Since its return, the tournament used an unusual point scoring system. As with most league competitions, three points were awarded for a win, one for a draw, and none for a loss. An additional point, however, was awarded for each goal scored. The system was designed to reward teams that adopted a more attacking style of play. Each entrant played two matches, with the winner being the club that finished at the top of the table. The original competition was held at Het Olympisch Stadion where Ajax played the bigget games until 1996. The Amsterdam Arena (now Johan Cruyff Arena) played host to the event since its return until the last edition was played in 2009. Ajax is the most successful team of the tournament, having won it a record ten times, while Benfica from Portugal was the last team to win the tournament, in 2009.

=== Copa Amsterdam ===
Established in 2005, the Copa Amsterdam is an international friendly football tournament for Under-19 youth teams, that is organized by Ajax and the Amsterdam city council, which takes place at the Olympic Stadium as part of the annual Amsterdam Sports Weekend, a citywide sponsored initiative to promote 'sports and recreation' within the city of Amsterdam. Each Summer the city of Amsterdam and Ajax invite U-19 teams from various top clubs from around the World to participate in the tournament. Seven teams are invited and play in the competition every year. Over the years, clubs such as Barcelona, Juventus, Chelsea and Real Madrid have had their senior youth teams participate in the tournament. Cruzeiro from Brazil is the most successful club in the history of the tournament, having won it three times in total.

=== Future Cup ===
Established in 2010, the AEGON Future Cup is an international friendly tournament for Under-17 youth teams, which is organized by AFC Ajax and their main sponsor, the insurance company AEGON. The tournament is held each year at the Johan Cruyff Arena and at the Sportpark De Toekomst, the team's training ground, which also inspired the name of the competition, since De Toekomst in Dutch means The Future. Every year during the Easter weekend, six U-17 teams are invited to participate in the competition, while the seventh place for the contesters is reserved for the winners of the "Craques Mongeral AEGON Future Cup" in Brazil, the sister competition of the tournament in South America. Youth teams from top clubs such as Manchester United, Bayern Munich, Milan and many more have participated in the competition over the years. Ajax is the most successful club of the tournament, having won the trophy a total of five times.

== See also ==
- List of football clubs in the Netherlands
- List of world champion football clubs

== Bibliography ==
- (in Dutch) David Endt, De godenzonen van Ajax, Rap, Amsterdam, 1993, ISBN 90-6005-463-6
- (in Dutch) Jan Baltus Kok, Naar Ajax. Mobiliteitspatronen van bezoekers bij vier thuiswedstrijden van Ajax, University of Amsterdam, Amsterdam, 1992, ISSN 0922-5625
- Simon Kuper, Ajax, The Dutch, The War. Football in Europe during the Second World War, Orion Books, London (Translation of: Ajax, de Joden en Nederland ("Ajax, the Jews, The Netherlands)", 2003, ISBN 0-7528-4274-9
- (in Dutch) Evert Vermeer, 95 jaar Ajax. 1900–1995, Luitingh-Sijthoff, Amsterdam, 1996, ISBN 90-245-2364-8
