= 1933–34 Netherlands Football League Championship =

Netherl. Football Championship
- Season: 1933–1934
- Champions: AFC Ajax (5th title)

The Netherlands Football League Championship 1933–1934 was contested by 50 teams participating in five divisions. The national champion would be determined by a play-off featuring the winners of the eastern, northern, southern and two western football divisions of the Netherlands. AFC Ajax won this year's championship by beating KFC, Willem II, Heracles and Velocitas 1897.

== New entrants ==
Eerste Klasse East:

- Promoted from 2nd Division: HVV Hengelo

Eerste Klasse West-I:

- Moving in from West-II: AFC Ajax, HFC Haarlem and Sparta Rotterdam
- Promoted from 2nd Division: Koninklijke HFC

Eerste Klasse West-II:

- Moving in from West-I: DHC Delft, HBS Craeyenhout and RCH
- Promoted from 2nd Division: SBV Excelsior

== Divisions ==
=== Eerste Klasse East ===
| Pos | Team | Pld | W | D | L | GF | GA | GD | Pts | Qualification or relegation |
|---|---|---|---|---|---|---|---|---|---|---|
| 1 | Heracles | 18 | 14 | 3 | 1 | 57 | 15 | +42 | 31 | Qualified for Championship play-off |
| 2 | Go Ahead | 18 | 11 | 5 | 2 | 65 | 25 | +40 | 27 | |
| 3 | SC Enschede | 18 | 10 | 3 | 5 | 58 | 31 | +27 | 23 | |
| 4 | PEC Zwolle | 18 | 8 | 1 | 9 | 43 | 45 | −2 | 17 | |
| 5 | Vitesse Arnhem | 18 | 6 | 4 | 8 | 40 | 45 | −5 | 16 | |
| 6 | HVV Tubantia | 18 | 7 | 2 | 9 | 36 | 51 | −15 | 16 | |
| 7 | AGOVV Apeldoorn | 18 | 6 | 3 | 9 | 25 | 44 | −19 | 15 | |
| 8 | FC Wageningen | 18 | 4 | 5 | 9 | 22 | 37 | −15 | 13 | |
| 9 | Enschedese Boys | 18 | 5 | 2 | 11 | 26 | 43 | −17 | 12 | |
| 10 | HVV Hengelo | 18 | 3 | 4 | 11 | 27 | 63 | −36 | 10 | Relegated to 2nd Division |

Source: rsssf.com

=== Eerste Klasse North ===
| Pos | Team | Pld | W | D | L | GF | GA | GD | Pts | Qualification or relegation |
|---|---|---|---|---|---|---|---|---|---|---|
| 1 | Velocitas 1897 | 18 | 16 | 0 | 2 | 87 | 24 | +63 | 32 | Qualified for Championship play-off |
| 2 | Be Quick 1887 | 18 | 13 | 2 | 3 | 70 | 26 | +44 | 28 | |
| 3 | GVAV Rapiditas | 18 | 12 | 2 | 4 | 68 | 42 | +26 | 26 | |
| 4 | VV Leeuwarden | 18 | 8 | 3 | 7 | 38 | 42 | −4 | 19 | |
| 5 | Veendam | 18 | 8 | 2 | 8 | 62 | 56 | +6 | 18 | |
| 6 | LVV Friesland | 18 | 7 | 2 | 9 | 46 | 56 | −10 | 16 | |
| 7 | Achilles 1894 | 18 | 6 | 3 | 9 | 39 | 57 | −18 | 15 | |
| 8 | Sneek Wit Zwart | 18 | 5 | 1 | 12 | 31 | 60 | −29 | 11 | |
| 9 | LAC Frisia 1883 | 18 | 5 | 0 | 13 | 40 | 63 | −23 | 10 | |
| 10 | MVV Alcides | 18 | 2 | 1 | 15 | 36 | 91 | −55 | 5 | Relegated to 2nd Division |

Source: rsssf.com

=== Eerste Klasse South ===
| Pos | Team | Pld | W | D | L | GF | GA | GD | Pts | Qualification or relegation |
|---|---|---|---|---|---|---|---|---|---|---|
| 1 | Willem II | 18 | 13 | 2 | 3 | 44 | 28 | +16 | 28 | Qualified for Championship play-off |
| 2 | LONGA | 18 | 13 | 0 | 5 | 54 | 33 | +21 | 26 | |
| 3 | PSV Eindhoven | 18 | 9 | 4 | 5 | 45 | 31 | +14 | 22 | |
| 4 | MVV Maastricht | 18 | 9 | 2 | 7 | 46 | 44 | +2 | 20 | |
| 5 | FC Eindhoven | 18 | 7 | 3 | 8 | 32 | 30 | +2 | 17 | |
| 6 | Bleijerheide | 18 | 6 | 4 | 8 | 38 | 42 | −4 | 16 | |
| 7 | NOAD | 18 | 5 | 4 | 9 | 28 | 33 | −5 | 14 | |
| 8 | BVV Den Bosch | 18 | 6 | 2 | 10 | 34 | 50 | −16 | 14 | |
| 9 | NAC | 18 | 4 | 4 | 10 | 25 | 33 | −8 | 12 | |
| 10 | Zeelandia Middelburg | 18 | 5 | 1 | 12 | 31 | 53 | −22 | 11 | Relegated to 2nd Division |

Source: rsssf.com

=== Eerste Klasse West-I ===
| Pos | Team | Pld | W | D | L | GF | GA | GD | Pts | Qualification or relegation |
|---|---|---|---|---|---|---|---|---|---|---|
| 1 | AFC Ajax | 18 | 16 | 0 | 2 | 70 | 33 | +37 | 32 | Qualified for Championship play-off |
| 2 | VSV | 18 | 11 | 0 | 7 | 50 | 46 | +4 | 22 | |
| 3 | Feijenoord | 18 | 10 | 1 | 7 | 46 | 34 | +12 | 21 | |
| 4 | ZFC | 18 | 9 | 1 | 8 | 57 | 40 | +17 | 19 | Division West-II next season |
| 5 | Sparta Rotterdam | 18 | 9 | 0 | 9 | 34 | 50 | −16 | 18 | Division West-II next season |
| 6 | HFC Haarlem | 18 | 7 | 2 | 9 | 40 | 48 | −8 | 16 | Division West-II next season |
| 7 | ADO Den Haag | 18 | 7 | 1 | 10 | 45 | 48 | −3 | 15 | |
| 8 | Hermes DVS | 18 | 7 | 1 | 10 | 51 | 55 | −4 | 15 | Division West-II next season |
| 9 | Koninklijke HFC | 18 | 5 | 2 | 11 | 29 | 48 | −19 | 12 | |
| 10 | HVV 't Gooi | 18 | 4 | 2 | 12 | 38 | 58 | −20 | 10 | Relegated to 2nd Division |

Source: rsssf.com

=== Eerste Klasse West-II ===
| Pos | Team | Pld | W | D | L | GF | GA | GD | Pts | Qualification or relegation |
|---|---|---|---|---|---|---|---|---|---|---|
| 1 | KFC | 18 | 12 | 2 | 4 | 53 | 32 | +21 | 26 | Qualified for Championship play-off |
| 2 | HBS Craeyenhout | 18 | 10 | 3 | 5 | 50 | 36 | +14 | 23 | |
| 3 | Stormvogels | 18 | 11 | 1 | 6 | 29 | 26 | +3 | 23 | |
| 4 | DHC Delft | 18 | 10 | 1 | 7 | 46 | 43 | +3 | 21 | Division West-I next season |
| 5 | DFC | 18 | 8 | 1 | 9 | 43 | 43 | 0 | 17 | |
| 6 | RCH | 18 | 8 | 1 | 9 | 30 | 40 | −10 | 17 | Division West-I next season |
| 7 | Xerxes | 18 | 7 | 2 | 9 | 52 | 54 | −2 | 16 | Division West-I next season |
| 8 | VUC | 18 | 4 | 5 | 9 | 44 | 52 | −8 | 13 | Division West-I next season |
| 9 | SBV Excelsior | 18 | 5 | 2 | 11 | 39 | 53 | −14 | 12 | |
| 10 | FC Hilversum | 18 | 4 | 4 | 10 | 34 | 41 | −7 | 12 | Relegated to 2nd Division |

Source: rsssf.com

=== Championship play-off ===
| Pos | Team | Pld | W | D | L | GF | GA | GD | Pts | Qualification | AJA | KFC | WIL | HER | VEL |
|---|---|---|---|---|---|---|---|---|---|---|---|---|---|---|---|
| 1 | AFC Ajax | 8 | 4 | 2 | 2 | 21 | 8 | +13 | 10 | Tie-break play-off | | 1–1 | 5–0 | 9–1 | 3–1 |
| 2 | KFC | 8 | 4 | 2 | 2 | 16 | 7 | +9 | 10 | Tie-break play-off | 2–0 | | 2–3 | 0–1 | 4–0 |
| 3 | Willem II | 8 | 4 | 2 | 2 | 16 | 17 | −1 | 10 | Tie-break play-off | 1–1 | 1–1 | | 3–1 | 6–4 |
| 4 | Heracles | 8 | 4 | 0 | 4 | 13 | 20 | −7 | 8 | | 2–1 | 1–4 | 3–0 | | 3–1 |
| 5 | Velocitas 1897 | 8 | 1 | 0 | 7 | 8 | 22 | −14 | 2 | | 0–1 | 0–2 | 0–2 | 2–1 | |

Source: rsssf.com

=== Tie-break play-off ===
| Pos | Team | Pld | W | D | L | GF | GA | GD | Pts | AJA | KFC | WIL |
|---|---|---|---|---|---|---|---|---|---|---|---|---|
| 1 | AFC Ajax | 2 | 1 | 1 | 0 | 6 | 3 | +3 | 3 | | 2–2 | 4–1 |
| 2 | KFC | 2 | 1 | 1 | 0 | 4 | 3 | +1 | 3 | — | | 2–1 |
| 3 | Willem II | 2 | 0 | 0 | 2 | 2 | 6 | −4 | 0 | — | — | |

Source: rsssf.com
