= Uri Coronel =

Dutch sports director

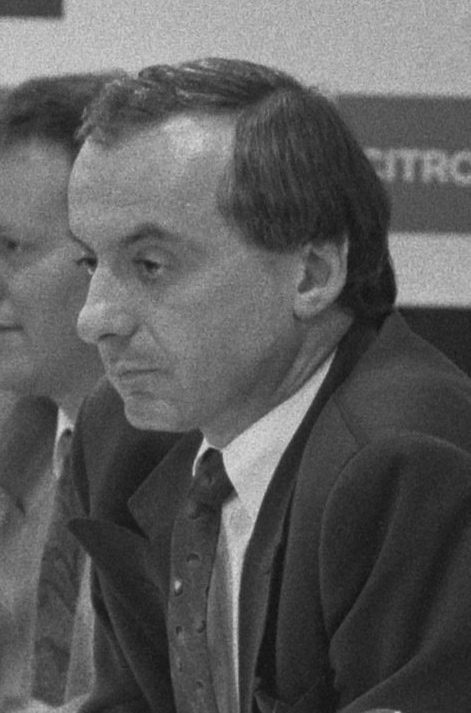
Uri Coronel (1989)

Maurice Uriel "Uri" Coronel (24 December 1946 – 18 July 2016) was a Dutch sports director and chairman of Ajax, a position he held at the club from April 2008 to 25 July 2011. He was born in Amsterdam.

== Career ==
Uri Coronel was a board member for the Dutch association football club Ajax from 1989 until 1997. He was the driving force behind the relocation of the club from its former home of De Meer Stadion to the current home at the Amsterdam ArenA. In 2007, he was the head of the committee that investigated the functionality of the club. Chairman John Jakke and Managing Director Maarten Fontein were scrutinized following the investigation, leading to their immediate resignation. Coronel subsequently became the new Chairman of Ajax following the dismissal. The function of the chairman of the club became an unpaid position. With the arrival of Coronel, Ajax would once again have a Jewish chairman. As chairman, however, Coronel came under harsh criticism, as his direction for the club deviated too much from his own initial report which was submitted by his investigative committee.

On 30 March 2011, the board of Ajax, including Coronel, announced their resignation, as a result of an impending deadlock, after tensions arose between the leadership of the club and club icon Johan Cruyff.

Outside of Ajax, Coronel was very successful in the field of insurance. He was member of the Sportraad Amsterdam, an advisory body to the municipal government and held many other functions in social organizations.

Coronel died on 18 July 2016 at the age of 69.

== See also ==
- List of Jews in sports (non-players)
- AFC Ajax
- History of AFC Ajax
