= 1938–39 Netherlands Football League Championship =

Netherl. Football Championship
- Season: 1938–1939
- Champions: AFC Ajax (7th title)

The Netherlands Football League Championship 1938–1939 was contested by 51 teams participating in five divisions. The national champion would be determined by a play-off featuring the winners of the eastern, northern, southern and two western football divisions of the Netherlands. AFC Ajax won this year's championship by beating DWS, NEC, FC Eindhoven and Achilles 1894.

== New entrants ==
Eerste Klasse East:

- Promoted from 2nd Division: Quick Nijmegen

Eerste Klasse North:

- Promoted from 2nd Division: FVC

Eerste Klasse West-I:

- Moving in from West-II: Blauw-Wit Amsterdam, HVV 't Gooi, HBS Craeyenhout, Hermes DVS, Stormvogels and Xerxes

Eerste Klasse West-II:

- Moving in from West-I: AFC Ajax, DFC, RFC, VSV, VUC
- Promoted from 2nd Division: DOS

== Divisions ==
=== Eerste Klasse East ===
Pos	Team	Pld	W	D	L	GF	GA	GD	Pts	Qualification or relegation
1	NEC Nijmegen	18	11	3	4	35	29	+6	25	Qualified for Championship play-off
2	AGOVV Apeldoorn	18	10	4	4	54	32	+22	24	
3	Heracles	18	10	3	5	49	28	+21	23	
4	SC Enschede	18	10	3	5	36	24	+12	23	
5	Go Ahead	18	7	4	7	34	32	+2	18	
6	HVV Tubantia	18	7	4	7	41	42	−1	18	
7	FC Wageningen	18	4	6	8	29	46	−17	14	
8	Quick Nijmegen	18	4	5	9	33	41	−8	13	
9	HVV Hengelo	18	5	3	10	32	44	−12	13	
10	ZAC	18	2	5	11	24	49	−25	9	Relegated to 2nd Division

Source: rsssf.com

=== Eerste Klasse North ===
Pos	Team	Pld	W	D	L	GF	GA	GD	Pts	Qualification or relegation
1	Achilles 1894	18	12	4	2	43	18	+25	28	Qualified for Championship play-off
2	GVAV Rapiditas	18	12	3	3	49	24	+25	27	
3	sc Heerenveen	18	12	1	5	61	49	+12	25	
4	Sneek Wit Zwart	18	10	4	4	31	18	+13	24	
5	HSC	18	9	3	6	42	36	+6	21	
6	VV Leeuwarden	18	6	2	10	28	35	−7	14	
7	Be Quick 1887	18	4	3	11	30	48	−18	11	
8	Velocitas 1897	18	3	5	10	23	43	−20	11	
9	Veendam	18	3	4	11	33	47	−14	10	
10	FVC	18	2	5	11	28	50	−22	9	Relegated to 2nd Division

Source: rsssf.com

=== Eerste Klasse South ===
Pos	Team	Pld	W	D	L	GF	GA	GD	Pts	Qualification or relegation
1	FC Eindhoven	20	14	3	3	44	13	+31	31	Qualified for Championship play-off
2	MVV Maastricht	20	11	6	3	43	35	+8	28	
3	NAC	20	10	6	4	33	19	+14	26	
4	PSV Eindhoven	20	7	6	7	35	32	+3	20	
5	Juliana	20	8	4	8	39	39	0	20	
6	Willem II	20	9	2	9	40	41	−1	20	
7	LONGA	20	7	4	9	39	32	+7	18	
8	BVV Den Bosch	20	5	6	9	35	41	−6	16	
9	RFC Roermond	19	7	2	10	28	40	−12	16	
10	NOAD	19	4	7	8	36	42	−6	15	
11	Bleijerheide	20	2	4	14	22	60	−38	8	Relegated to 2nd Division

Source: rsssf.com

=== Eerste Klasse West-I ===
Pos	Team	Pld	W	D	L	GF	GA	GD	Pts	Qualification
1	DWS	18	12	3	3	49	26	+23	27	Qualified for Championship play-off
2	ADO Den Haag	18	9	6	3	33	23	+10	24	
3	Blauw-Wit Amsterdam	18	5	8	5	31	22	+9	18	
4	Sparta Rotterdam	18	6	5	7	35	38	−3	17	Division West-II next season
5	Stormvogels	18	6	5	7	33	38	−5	17	
6	CVV Mercurius	18	6	5	7	24	28	−4	17	Division West-II next season
7	Hermes DVS	18	6	5	7	31	38	−7	17	Division West-II next season
8	Xerxes	18	6	4	8	38	36	+2	16	Division West-II next season
9	KFC	18	4	7	7	31	32	−1	15	
10	HBS Craeyenhout	18	4	4	10	30	54	−24	12	Division West-II next season

Source: rsssf.com

=== Eerste Klasse West-II ===
Pos	Team	Pld	W	D	L	GF	GA	GD	Pts	Qualification
1	AFC Ajax	18	12	3	3	47	19	+28	27	Qualified for Championship play-off Division West-I next season
2	Feijenoord	18	12	1	5	40	30	+10	25	
3	VUC	18	10	3	5	47	32	+15	23	
4	DOS	18	8	4	6	41	40	+1	20	Division West-I next season
5	HFC Haarlem	18	7	4	7	48	45	+3	18	Division West-I next season
6	DHC Delft	18	7	4	7	40	39	+1	18	
7	VSV	18	8	0	10	42	46	−4	16	Division West-I next season
8	HVV 't Gooi	18	6	3	9	24	34	−10	15	Division West-I next season
9	RFC Rotterdam	18	3	5	10	30	56	−26	11	
10	DFC	18	3	1	14	30	48	−18	7	

Source: rsssf.com

=== Championship play-off ===
Pos	Team	Pld	W	D	L	GF	GA	GD	Pts	AJA	DWS	NEC	EIN	ACH
1	AFC Ajax	8	5	2	1	19	11	+8	12		1–1	2–1	3–0	3–0
2	DWS	8	3	4	1	20	11	+9	10	1–1		7–2	1–1	5–1
3	NEC Nijmegen	8	4	0	4	21	21	0	8	6–2	2–1		1–2	3–4
4	FC Eindhoven	8	2	3	3	14	15	−1	7	0–2	2–2	2–3		5–1
5	Achilles 1894	8	1	1	6	12	28	−16	3	2–5	1–2	1–3	2–2	

Source: rsssf.com
