= List of Feyenoord seasons =

This is a list of the seasons played by Feyenoord from 1909 when the club first participated in competition, the club was established in 1908, to the most recent seasons. The club's achievements in all major national and international competitions as well as the top scorers are listed. Top scorers in bold and coloured background were also top scorers of the Eredivisie. The list is separated into two parts, coinciding with the two major episodes of Dutch football:

- Before 1956 the Dutch league structure was changing with several divisions. In 1956 the Eredivisie, the highest tier in Dutch football, started.
- Since 1956 a nationwide league, the Eredivisie, exists.

Feyenoord have won the Netherlands Football League Championship/Eredivisie sixteen times; eleven of them in the Eredivisie. The club have also won the KNVB Cup thirteen times. Feyenoord won three European titles: the 1969–70 European Cup, the 1973–74 UEFA Cup and the 2001–02 UEFA Cup. They also won the 1970 Intercontinental Cup. The club have never been relegated from the Eredivisie.

== Key ==
Key to league record:

- Pld – Matches played
- W – Matches won
- D – Matches drawn
- L – Matches lost
- GF – Goals for
- GA – Goals against
- Pts – Points
- Pos – Final position

Key to colours and symbols:
Symbol	Meaning\
**W**	Championship Winners
RU	Cup Runners-up
↑	Promoted
↓	Relegated
EC	European Cup / Champions League
EC	UEFA Cup / Europa League or Europa Conference League
♦	Top league scorer in Feyenoord's division

Key to rounds:

- Prel. – Preliminary round
- Q1 – First qualifying round
- Q2 – Second qualifying round, etc.
- Inter – Intermediate round (between qualifying rounds and rounds proper)
- GS – Group stage
- 1R – First round
- 2R – Second round, etc.
- R64 – 1/32 Final (round of 64)
- R32 – 1/16 Final (round of 32)
- R16 – 1/8 Final (round of 16)
- KRPO – Knock-Out Round Play-Offs
- QF – Quarter-final
- SF – Semi-final
- F – Final
- W – Winners
- DNE – Did not enter

Key to competitions

- JCS – Johan Cruyff Shield
- EC – European Cup (1955–1992)
- UCL – UEFA Champions League (1992–present)
- CWC – UEFA Cup Winners' Cup (1960–1999)
- UC – UEFA Cup (1971–2009)
- UEL – UEFA Europa League (2009–present)
- UECL – UEFA Europa Conference League (2020–present)
- USC – UEFA Super Cup
- IC – Intercontinental Cup
- RVB – Rotterdamse Voetbal Bond
- NVB – Nederlandse Voetbal Bond
- KNVB – Koninklijke Nederlandse Voetbal Bond

== Seasons until 1956 ==
Results of league and cup competitions by season
Season	Division	Pld	W	D	L	GF	GA	Pts	Pos	KNVB Cup	JCS	Cup	Result	Player(s)	Goals
Season	League									KNVB Cup	JCS	UEFA – FIFA		Top goalscorer(s)	
1909–10	RVB 2e Klasse	10	6	2	2	25	12	14	2nd ↑	-				-	-
1910–11	RVB 1e Klasse	14	10	1	3	50	16	21	2nd	-				-	-
1911–12	RVB 1e Klasse	14	13	1	0	49	12	27	1st ↑	-				-	-
1912–13	NVB 3e Klasse	12	6	2	4	31	13	14	3rd	-				-	-
1913–14	NVB 3e Klasse	12	7	3	2	41	12	17	3rd	-				-	-
1914–15	NVB 3e Klasse	10	6	2	2	18	8	14	2nd	1R				-	-
1915–16	NVB 3e Klasse	8	7	1	0	28	1	15	1st ↑	4R				-	-
1916–17	NVB 2e Klasse	14	7	3	4	32	14	17	4th ↑	SF				-	-
1917–18	NVB 1e Klasse West-B	22	10	4	8	31	30	24	3rd	1R				-	-
1918–19	NVB 1e Klasse West-B	22	10	7	5	53	37	27	3rd ↓	Not played				-	-
1919–20	KNVB Overgangsklasse	22	12	1	9	48	40	25	3rd	DNE				-	-
1920–21	KNVB Overgangsklasse	22	17	3	2	67	21	37	1st ↑	DNE				-	-
1921–22	KNVB 1e Klasse West	22	12	3	7	44	30	27	2nd	Not played				-	-
1922–22	KNVB 1e Klasse West	22	10	5	7	47	33	25	3rd	Not played				-	-
1923–24	KNVB 1e Klasse West-I Championship Playoff	18 8	13 5	2 3	3 0	61 23	29 11	28 13	**W**	Not played				-	-
1924–25	KNVB 1e Klasse West-I	18	11	3	4	51	22	25	2nd	R16				-	-
1925–26	KNVB 1e Klasse West-II Championship Playoff	18 8	9 3	5 2	4 3	47 20	29 20	23 8	1st 3rd	3R				-	-
1926–27	KNVB 1e Klasse West-II Championship Playoff	18 8	12 3	3 1	3 4	75 10	31 10	27 7	1st 4th	3R				-	-
1927–28	KNVB 1e Klasse West-II Championship Playoff	18 8	13 6	3 0	2 2	55 17	20 9	29 12	**W**	R16				-	-
1928–29	KNVB 1e Klasse West-II Championship Playoff	18 8	13 4	3 0	2 4	60 14	32 11	29 8	1st 3rd	Not played				-	-
1929–30	KNVB 1e Klasse West-II	18	9	3	6	53	31	21	3rd	**W**				-	-
1930–31	KNVB 1e Klasse West-II Championship Playoff	18 8	13 3	3 2	2 3	50 17	17 15	29 8	1st 2nd	Not played				-	-
1931–32	KNVB 1e Klasse West-II Championship Playoff	18 8	13 5	1 2	5 1	45 28	32 11	27 12	1st 2nd	3R				-	-
1932–33	KNVB 1e Klasse West-I Championship Playoff	18 8	13 4	3 2	2 2	52 21	25 14	29 10	1st 2nd	Not played				-	-
1933–34	KNVB 1e Klasse West-I	18	10	1	7	46	34	21	3rd	RU				-	-
1934–35	KNVB 1e Klasse West-I	18	13	2	3	53	32	28	2nd	**W**				-	-
1935–36	KNVB 1e Klasse West-II Championship Playoff	18 8	13 6	3 0	2 2	59 25	19 16	29 12	**W**	R16				-	-
1936–37	KNVB 1e Klasse West-II Championship Playoff	18 8	15 5	1 0	2 3	66 21	23 9	31 10	1st 2nd	DNE				-	-
1937–38	KNVB 1e Klasse West-II Championship Playoff	18 8	13 6	1 2	4 0	50 20	20 7	27 14	**W**	DNE				-	-
1938–39	KNVB 1e Klasse West-II	18	12	1	5	40	30	25	2nd	2R				-	-
1939–40	KNVB 1e Klasse West-II Championship Playoff	18 8	12 5	5 1	1 2	51 19	16 14	29 11	**W**	Not played				-	-
1940–41	KNVB 1e Klasse West-II	18	8	3	7	34	35	19	6th	Not played				-	-
1941–42	KNVB 1e Klasse West-I	18	10	2	6	39	34	22	2nd	Not played				-	-
1942–43	KNVB 1e Klasse West-II Championship Playoff	18 8	14 3	3 3	1 2	48 9	19 9	31 9	1st 2nd	DNE				-	-
1943–44	KNVB 1e Klasse West-II	18	6	7	5	30	28	19	5th	Prel.				-	-
1944–45	World War II														
1945–46	KNVB 1e Klasse West-II	20	7	5	8	40	33	17	6th	Not played				-	-
1946–47	KNVB 1e Klasse West-I	20	10	4	6	57	44	24	2nd	Not played				-	-
1947–48	KNVB 1e Klasse West-II	20	13	3	5	44	21	29	2nd	1R				-	-
1948–49	KNVB 1e Klasse West-II	20	12	5	3	57	40	29	2nd	SF				-	-
1949–50	KNVB 1e Klasse West-I	18	6	4	8	27	28	16	6th	5R				-	-
1950–51	KNVB 1e Klasse D	22	7	8	7	31	32	22	8th	Not played				-	-
1951–52	KNVB 1e Klasse C	26	14	3	9	57	51	31	4th	Not played				-	-
1952–53	KNVB 1e Klasse D	26	9	9	8	45	43	27	5th	Not played				-	-
1953–54	KNVB 1e Klasse D	26	13	4	9	46	31	30	5th	Not played				-	-
1954–55	KNVB 1e Klasse C	26	11	5	10	47	47	27	7th	Not played				-	-
1955–56	KNVB Hoofdklasse B	34	17	7	10	93	62	41	5th	Not played				Henk Schouten	30

== Seasons from 1956 to present ==
Results of league and cup competitions by season
Season	Division	Pld	W	D	L	GF	GA	Pts	Pos	KNVB Cup	JCS	Cup	Result	Player(s)	Goals
Season	League									KNVB Cup	JCS	UEFA – FIFA		Top goalscorer(s)	
1956–57	Eredivisie	34	15	9	10	79	58	39	6th	RU				Cor van der Gijp	39
1957–58	Eredivisie	34	13	6	15	74	76	32	11th	SF				Cor van der Gijp	31
1958–59	Eredivisie	34	17	7	10	84	54	41	5th	DNE				Cor van der Gijp	22
1959–60	Eredivisie	34	20	10	4	94	32	50	2nd	Not played				Henk Schouten	25
1960–61	Eredivisie	34	24	5	5	100	40	53	**W**	R32				Cor van der Gijp	29
1961–62	Eredivisie	34	20	10	4	88	35	50	**W**	3R		EC	R16	Cor van der Gijp	18
1962–63	Eredivisie	30	14	9	7	58	40	37	4th	R16		EC	SF	Piet Kruiver	20
1963–64	Eredivisie	30	16	5	9	77	33	37	4th	QF				Piet Kruiver	25
1964–65	Eredivisie	30	21	3	6	77	30	45	**W**	**W**				Henk Groot	20
1965–66	Eredivisie	30	21	3	6	65	30	45	2nd	R16		EC	Prel.	Piet Kruiver ♦	23
1966–67	Eredivisie	34	21	9	4	81	33	51	2nd	R32				Harry Bild	25
1967–68	Eredivisie	34	25	5	4	84	21	55	2nd	GS				Ove Kindvall ♦	28
1968–69	Eredivisie	34	26	5	3	73	21	57	**W**	**W**				Ove Kindvall ♦	33
1969–70	Eredivisie	34	22	11	1	81	22	55	2nd	2R		EC	**W**	Ove Kindvall	32
1970–71	Eredivisie	34	26	5	3	82	25	57	**W**	QF		IC EC	**W** R32	Ove Kindvall ♦	27
1971–72	Eredivisie	34	26	3	5	73	24	55	2nd	R16		EC	QF	Lex Schoenmaker	19
1972–73	Eredivisie	34	27	4	3	89	28	58	2nd	QF		UC	R32	Theo de Jong	18
1973–74	Eredivisie	34	25	6	3	96	28	56	**W**	QF		UC	**W**	Lex Schoenmaker	27
1974–75	Eredivisie	34	23	7	4	94	29	53	2nd	R16		EC	R16	Willy Kruez	25
1975–76	Eredivisie	34	23	6	5	88	40	52	2nd	QF		UC	R64	Nico Jansen	19
1976–77	Eredivisie	34	16	12	6	65	35	48	4th	R16		UC	QF	Nico Jansen	28
1977–78	Eredivisie	34	10	12	12	52	47	32	10th	R16				Willy Kruez	12
1978–79	Eredivisie	34	19	13	2	62	19	51	2nd	R32				Jan Peters	13
1979–80	Eredivisie	34	15	13	6	58	36	43	4th	**W**		UC	R16	Petur Petursson	34
1980–81	Eredivisie	34	18	9	7	74	48	47	4th	R16		CWC	SF	Pierre Vermeulen	13
1981–82	Eredivisie	34	13	12	9	61	59	38	6th	R16		UC	R16	Andrej Jeliazkov	12
1982–83	Eredivisie	34	22	10	2	72	39	54	2nd	R16				Peter Houtman ♦	31
1983–84	Eredivisie	34	25	7	2	96	31	57	**W**	**W**		UC	R32	Ruud Gullit Peter Houtman	25
1984–85	Eredivisie	34	21	6	7	87	51	48	3rd	R32		EC	R32	Peter Houtman	22
1985–86	Eredivisie	34	19	6	9	74	50	44	3rd	R16		UC	R64	John Eriksen	25
1986–87	Eredivisie	34	15	12	7	73	43	42	3rd	R16		UC	R32	Simon Tahamata	16
1987–88	Eredivisie	34	14	8	12	63	57	32	6th	QF		UC	R16	Mario Been André Hoekstra	15
1988–89	Eredivisie	34	15	10	9	66	52	40	4th	R16				Martin van Geel	15
1989–90	Eredivisie	34	9	13	12	51	45	31	11th	R16		UC	R64	Piet Keur	15
1990–91	Eredivisie	34	8	16	10	39	40	32	8th	**W**				Harry van der Laan	11
1991–92	Eredivisie	34	20	9	5	54	19	49	3rd	**W**	**W**	CWC	SF	Marian Damaschin Jozsef Kiprich	12
1992–93	Eredivisie	34	22	9	3	82	32	53	**W**	SF	RU	CWC	QF	Jozsef Kiprich	24
1993–94	Eredivisie	34	19	13	2	61	27	51	2nd	**W**	RU	UCL	R16	Rob Witschge	11
1994–95	Eredivisie	34	19	5	10	66	56	43	4th	**W**	RU	CWC	QF	Henrik Larsson	16
1995–96	Eredivisie	34	18	9	7	66	36	63	3rd	SF	RU	CWC	SF	Ronald Koeman	14
1996–97	Eredivisie	34	22	7	5	67	34	73	2nd	QF		UC	R16	Pablo Sánchez	17
1997–98	Eredivisie	34	18	7	9	62	40	61	4th	QF		UCL	GS	Julio Ricardo Cruz	19
1998–99	Eredivisie	34	25	5	4	76	38	80	**W**	SF		UC	R64	Jon Dahl Tomasson	16
1999–2000	Eredivisie	34	18	10	6	66	42	64	3rd	R16	**W**	UCL	2GS	Julio Ricardo Cruz	18
2000–01	Eredivisie	34	21	3	10	67	37	66	2nd	QF		UCL UC	Q3 R32	Jon Dahl Tomasson	17
2001–02	Eredivisie	34	19	7	8	68	29	64	3rd	QF		UCL UC	GS **W**	Pierre van Hooijdonk ♦	33
2002–03	Eredivisie	34	25	5	4	89	39	80	3rd	RU		USC UCL	RU GS	Pierre van Hooijdonk	30
2003–04	Eredivisie	34	20	8	6	71	38	68	3rd	QF		UC	R64	Dirk Kuyt	22
2004–05	Eredivisie	34	19	5	10	90	51	62	4th	SF		UC	R32	Dirk Kuyt ♦	36
2005–06	Eredivisie	34	21	8	5	79	34	71	3rd	R16		UC	1R	Dirk Kuyt	25
2006–07	Eredivisie	34	15	8	11	56	66	53	7th	R32		UC	R32	Angelos Charisteas	10
2007–08	Eredivisie	34	18	6	10	64	41	60	6th	**W**				Roy Makaay	20
2008–09	Eredivisie	34	12	9	13	54	46	45	7th	R16	RU	UC	GS	Roy Makaay	20
2009–10	Eredivisie	34	17	12	5	54	31	63	4th	RU				Jon Dahl Tomasson	12
2010–11	Eredivisie	34	12	8	14	53	54	44	10th	R64		UEL	PO	Luc Castaignos	15
2011–12	Eredivisie	34	21	7	6	70	37	70	2nd	R32				John Guidetti	20
2012–13	Eredivisie	34	21	6	7	64	38	69	3rd	QF		UCL UEL	Q3 PO	Graziano Pellè	29
2013–14	Eredivisie	34	20	7	7	76	40	67	2nd	QF		UEL	PO	Graziano Pellè	26
2014–15	Eredivisie	34	17	8	9	56	39	59	4th	R64		UCL UEL	Q3 R32	Colin Kazim-Richards	13
2015–16	Eredivisie	34	19	6	9	62	40	63	3rd	**W**				Dirk Kuyt	23
2016–17	Eredivisie	34	26	4	4	86	25	82	**W**	QF	RU	UEL	GS	Nicolai Jørgensen ♦	25
2017–18	Eredivisie	34	20	6	8	76	39	66	4th	**W**	**W**	UCL	GS	Steven Berghuis	23
2018–19	Eredivisie	34	20	5	9	75	41	65	3rd	SF	**W**	UEL	Q3	Robin van Persie	18
2019–20	Eredivisie	25	14	8	3	50	35	50	3rd	F		UEL	GS	Steven Berghuis ♦	22
2020–21	Eredivisie	34	16	11	7	64	36	59	5th	QF		UEL	GS	Steven Berghuis	18
2021–22	Eredivisie	34	22	5	7	76	34	71	3rd	R32		UECL	RU	Luis Sinisterra	23
2022–23	Eredivisie	34	25	7	2	81	30	82	**W**	SF		UEL	QF	Santiago Giménez	23
2023–24	Eredivisie	34	26	6	2	92	26	84	2nd	**W**	RU	UCL UEL	GS KRPO	Santiago Giménez	26
2024–25	Eredivisie	34	20	8	6	76	38	68	3rd	QF	**W**	UCL	R16	Igor Paixão	18
2025–26	Eredivisie	34	19	8	7	70	44	65	2nd	R32		UEL	LS	Ayase Ueda	26
