= Jaap Bulder =

Dutch footballer (1896–1979)

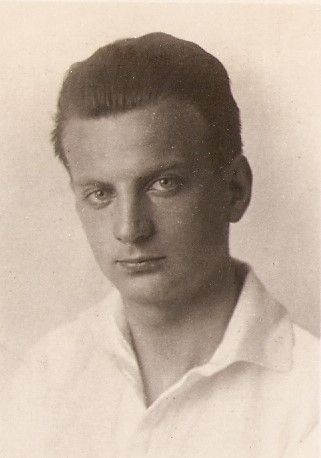

Personal information
- Full name: Jacob Eisse Bulder
- Date of birth: 27 September 1896
- Place of birth: Groningen, Netherlands
- Date of death: 30 April 1979 (aged 82)
- Place of death: Leiderdorp, Netherlands
- Position: Forward

Youth career
- 1906–1910: Be Quick

Senior career*
Years	Team	Apps	(Gls)
1910–1928	Be Quick	196+	(347+)

International career
1920–1923	Netherlands	6	(6)
Medal record
Men's football
Representing Netherlands
Olympic Games
Bronze medal – third place	1920 Antwerp	Team competition
- * Club domestic league appearances and goals

Jacob "Jaap" Eisse Bulder (27 September 1896 – 30 April 1979) was a Dutch footballer who played as a forward. He represented his home country at the 1920 Summer Olympics in Antwerp, Belgium. There he won the bronze medal with the Netherlands national team.

== Club career ==
Bulder played as a centre-forward for hometown club Be Quick, having made his debut on 23 October 1910 against WVV at the age of 14. He won 11 Northern Division titles with Be Quick, and the Dutch league title with them in 1919–20. Bulder scored 59 goals in 14 matches during 1919–20. He was considered the greatest footballer from the Northern Netherlands during his playing career; he was a great dribbler, a prolific goal scorer, and a technician who had practiced his technique with a tennis ball with his brother Evert Jan during their early years. Bulder played his final game on 9 April 1928 against Frisia.

Bulder scored a record 8 goals in a 14–0 win against Veendam in 1920, and also 8 in a 10–0 win against Alcides in 1922. That record would last until 1956, when Henk Schouten of Feyenoord scored 9 in one match.

In 1920, Bulder criticised the Dutch Football Association for never calling up players from the north of the country. His critique cost Bulder his debut in the national team, although he was still part of the 1920 Summer Olympics in Antwerp. Rebellion against the Dutch officials about the poor state of the base of the Dutch team in Antwerp cost Bulder his place in the team. He only returned to the national team after twenty months, when he would play in the inside forward trio with his club teammates Appie Groen and Harry Rodermond. Talented footballers from the Northern Netherlands were finally recognised.

On 16 September 1923, Jaap scored two goals in one minute against Velocitas, in the final of the Groninger Dagbladbeker.

== International career ==
He made his debut for the Netherlands in an August 1920 friendly match against Luxembourg in which he immediately scored and earned a total of 6 caps, scoring 6 goals. His final match was in an April 1923 friendly match against France.

== Personal life ==
Bulder was born in Groningen. His older brother Evert Jan (born 1893) was also a footballer and a member of the same Olympic squad. Bulder died, aged 82, in Leiderdorp.

== Career statistics ==
Appearances and goals by club, season, and competition. Only official games are included in this table.
Club	Season	Eerste Klasse North		League Play-Off		Dutch Cup		Groninger Dagblad		Total	
Club	Season	Apps	Goals	Apps	Goals	Apps	Goals	Apps	Goals	Apps	Goals
Be Quick	1910/1911	2+	0+	0	0	0	0	0	0	2+	0+
Be Quick	1911/1912	1	0	0	0	0	0	-	-	0	0
Be Quick	1912/1913	2+	4+	0	0	0	0	1+	1	3+	5+
Be Quick	1913/1914	7+	9+	0	0	0	0	0	0	7+	9+
Be Quick	1914/1915	7+	11+	0	0	2+	7+	2+	4+	11+	22+
Be Quick	1915/1916	8+	20+	0	0	1+	3+	2	3	11+	26+
Be Quick	1916–17	9+	22+	6+	5+	2	3	2+	1+	19+	31+
Be Quick	1917–18	11+	33+ (Note: 1 game and 9 goals in a cancelled match)	8+	4+	0	0	-	-	19+	38+
Be Quick	1918–1919	12+	23+	6+	3+	0	0	1+	3+	19+	30+
Be Quick	1919–20	14	59	6	8	0	0	1+	1+	21+	68+
Be Quick	1920–21	13+	30+	5+	3+	0	0	1+	0+	19+	33+
Be Quick	1921–22	16+	32+	6	2	0	0	0	0	22+	34+
Be Quick	1922–23	19+	42+ (Note: 2 games and 12 goals in cancelled matches)	6	2	0	0	2	3	27+	47+
Be Quick	1923–24	13+	23+	7	2	0	0	1+	2+	21+	27+
Be Quick	1924–25	2+	2+	0	0	0	0	–	–	2+	2+
Be Quick	1925–26	3+	2+	3+	1+	0	0	2+	2+	7+	4+
Be Quick	1926–27	0	0	0	0	0	0	–	–	0	0
Be Quick	1927–28	4+	5+	0	0	0	0	–	–	4+	5+
Be Quick	Total	143+	317+	53+	30+	5+	13+	15+	20+	216+	380+

== Honours ==
Competition	Number of times	Years
National
National football title	1	1919–1920
Regional
Champion of the North	11	1915, 1916, 1917, 1918, 1919, 1920, 1921, 1922, 1923, 1924, 1926
Groninger Dagbladbeker	4	1914, 1919, 1922, 1923
Individual (From 1912/13)
Club Top Scorer	11	1913–1924
Top Scorer of the North	11	1913–1924
