= Wim de Bois =

Dutch footballer and manager

Personal information
- Full name: Cornelis Hendrik Willem "Wim" de Bois
- Date of birth: 19 June 1896
- Place of birth: Steenwijk, Netherlands
- Date of death: 1 August 1975 (aged 79)
- Place of death: Oldenzaal, Netherlands
- Position: Forward

Senior career*
Years	Team	Apps	(Gls)
1919–1931	Ajax	33	(6)

Managerial career
- 1931–1934: BVV De Kennemers
- 1934–1937: Hermes DVS
- 1937–1941: Sportclub Enschede
- 1941–1948: DFC
- 1948: Dutch Guyana
- 1949–1952: DOS
- 1952–1956: RBC
- 1956–1957: Go Ahead
- 1957–1959: Veendam
- 1959–1963: Oldenzaal
- 1963–1965: Quick '20
- 1965–1967: Tubantia
- * Club domestic league appearances and goals as of 31 December 2015 ‡ National team caps and goals as of 31 December 2015

Cornelis Hendrik Willem de Bois (19 June 1896 – 1 August 1975) was a Dutch football manager and player who played for AFC Ajax in the Netherlands. During his managerial career he managed the Dutch Guyana national team (now known as Suriname), DFC, DOS, RBC, Go Ahead, SC Veendam, VV Oldenzaal, Quick '20 and Tubantia.

== Career ==
Born 19 June 1896 in Steenwijk, Overijssel, De Bois relocated to Amsterdam to play for AFC Ajax. De Bois made 64 appearances in the attack of Ajax, scoring 11 goals and helping his team to win the national championship in the 1930–31 season, his final season with the club.

== Managerial career ==
As one of the first football managers to be certified by the Royal Dutch Football Association (KNVB), De Bois took a managerial position with BVV De Kennemers in 1931. After three seasons he became manager of Hermes DVS, only to manage Sportclub Enschede three seasons later. From 1941 to 1948 he was the manager of DFC (now known as FC Dordrecht).

In 1948, De Bois became the manager of the Dutch Guyana national team, Dutch Guyana being the predecessor of Suriname, as the Dutch colony was known prior to 1976. He made his first appearance as newly appointed manager on 18 December 1948 in a 4–3 loss to Martinique.

After his brief stint in South America, De Bois returned to the Netherlands, taking the manager position at VV DOS in Utrecht. In 1952 he then relocated to Roosendaal to manage RBC. In 1957 he became manager of SC Veendam, whom he led to a Tweede Klasse championship, and promotion to the Eerste Divisie in 1959. He later managed VV Oldenzaal, Quick '20 and Tubantia, before retiring as a manager.

== Death ==
On 1 August 1975, De Bois was killed in a car accident near his home in Oldenzaal, it was the day that his former club AFC Ajax had organized a ceremonial friendly match between the senior teams of Ajax and FC Twente in honor of De Bois, who had officially declared his retirement from the sport that same year.

== Career statistics ==
=== Player ===
Club	Season	Kampioenscompetitie		Play Off		KNVB Cup		Other		Total	
Club	Season	Caps	Goals	Caps	Goals	Caps	Goals	Caps	Goals	Caps	Goals
Ajax; Netherlands	1919-20	16	4	0	0	0	0	4	4	20	8
Ajax; Netherlands	1920-21	4	0	1	0	0	0	2	0	7	0
Ajax; Netherlands	1921-22	5	0	0	0	0	0	2	0	7	0
Ajax; Netherlands	1922-23	1	0	0	0	0	0	2	0	3	0
Ajax; Netherlands	1923-24	0	0	0	0	0	0	3	0	3	0
Ajax; Netherlands	1924-25	0	0	0	0	3	0	3	0	6	0
Ajax; Netherlands	1925-26	3	2	0	0	0	0	3	0	6	2
Ajax; Netherlands	1926-27	0	0	0	0	0	0	1	0	1	0
Ajax; Netherlands	1928-29	3	0	0	0	0	0	0	0	3	0
Ajax; Netherlands	1929-30	1	0	0	0	5	1	1	0	7	1
Ajax; Netherlands	1930-31	0	0	0	0	0	0	1	0	1	0
Total		33	6	1	0	8	1	22	4	64	11
Source: AFC-Ajax.info.

== Honours ==
=== Player ===
AFC Ajax

- National championship: 1930–31

=== Coach ===
SC Veendam

- Tweede Divisie: 1958–59
