= Rieks de Haas =

Dutch footballer

- Haas in Groningen, June 1920; originally pictured with the Be Quick 1887 team

Personal information
- Full name: Theodoricus de Haas
- Date of birth: 2 September 1902
- Place of birth: Groningen, Netherlands
- Date of death: 6 January 1976 (aged 73)
- Position: Striker

Senior career*
Years	Team	Apps	(Gls)
1919–1927	Be Quick 1887		
1929–1934	Forward		
1934–1944	Be Quick 1887		

International career
1923–1926	Netherlands	4	(1)
- * Club domestic league appearances and goals

Theodoricus "Rieks" de Haas (2 September 1902 – 6 January 1976) was a Dutch footballer. He played in four matches for the Netherlands national football team from 1923 to 1926.

Born in Groningen, De Haas made his senior debut for hometown club Be Quick 1887 just three weeks after his 17th birthday. He won the 1920 national league title with the club in a team alongside fellow internationals Appie Groen, Max Tetzner and brothers Evert Jan and Jaap Bulder. De Haas scored the first goal in the decisive match against VOC from Rotterdam.
