= Louis Biesbrouck =

Dutch association football player

Loek Biesbrouck
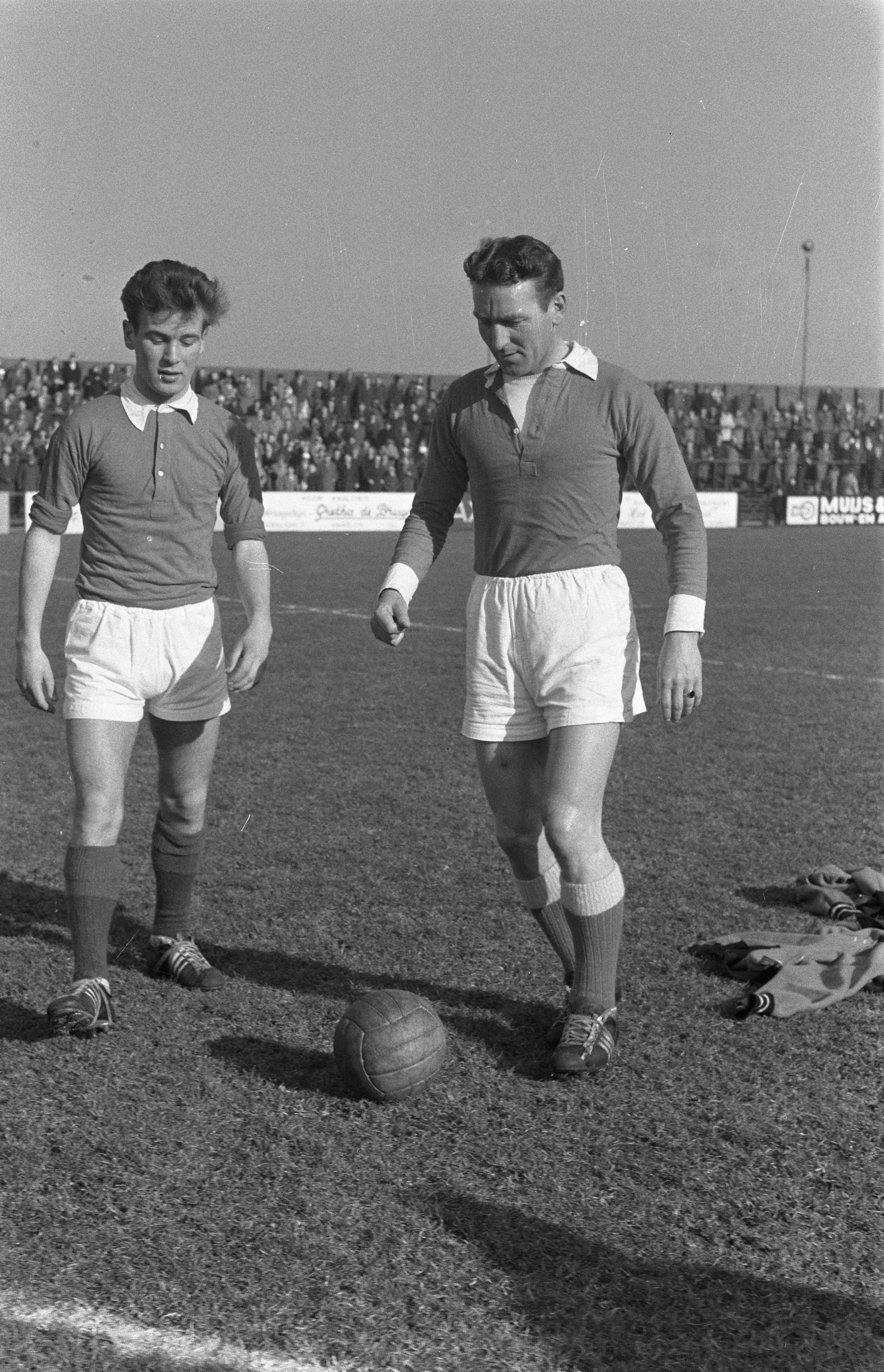
- Louis Biesbrouck (right) in 1960

Personal information
- Full name: Louis Biesbrouck
- Date of birth: 20 February 1921
- Place of birth: Haarlem, Netherlands
- Date of death: 20 December 2005 (aged 84)
- Place of death: Heemstede, Netherlands
- Position: Midfielder

Senior career*
Years	Team	Apps	(Gls)
1938–1960	RCH		

International career
1950–1954	Netherlands	19	(0)
- * Club domestic league appearances and goals

Louis "Loek" Biesbrouck (20 February 1921 – 20 December 2005) was a Dutch footballer, who played as a midfielder.

== Club career ==
Biesbrouck joined RCH at the age of ten, and made his debut for the first team in 1938, at the age of seventeen. A one-club man, he spent his whole career at RCH, which spanned 21 years. During his first years, he helped bring the team back to the Dutch first division, along with striker Wim Hanse. In the 1952–53 season, he achieved the high point of his club career by winning the Netherlands Football League Championship, which was the first for RCH since the 1922–23 season.

Despite offers from both national and foreign clubs, Biesbrouck always remained an amateur player, even after professionalism was introduced to Dutch football in 1954. He said that someone playing professional football is no longer a sportsman, but rather a slave. He scored 11 goals in 133 Eerste Divisie matches from 1956 to 1961.

After his career, he was appointed honorary member of RCH.

== International career ==
Biesbrouck was selected for the Dutch squad at the 1948 Summer Olympics, but did not make an appearance. He eventually made his debut for the Netherlands on 10 December 1950, against France. He was also selected for the 1952 Summer Olympics, where he captained the team during their only match, a 1–5 defeat against Brazil. In total, he gained 19 caps, of which 12 were as captain.

== Honours ==
- Netherlands Football League Championship:

1952–53
