= 1930–31 Netherlands Football League Championship =

Netherl. Football Championship
- Season: 1930–1931
- Champions: AFC Ajax (3rd title)

The Netherlands Football League Championship 1930–1931 was contested by 50 teams participating in five divisions. The national champion would be determined by a play-off featuring the winners of the eastern, northern, southern and two western football divisions of the Netherlands. AFC Ajax won this year's championship by beating Feijenoord, PSV Eindhoven, Go Ahead and Velocitas 1897.

== New entrants ==
Eerste Klasse North:

- Promoted from 2nd Division: Meppeler Sport Club

Eerste Klasse South:

- Promoted from 2nd Division: De Valk

Eerste Klasse West-I:

- Moving in from West-II: HVV 't Gooi, Hermes DVS, Koninklijke HFC, Stormvogels, VUC and ZFC

Eerste Klasse West-II:

- Moving in from West-I: ADO Den Haag, RCH, FC Hilversum, Sparta Rotterdam and VSV
- Promoted from 2nd Division: KFC

== Divisions ==
=== Eerste Klasse East ===
Pos	Team	Pld	W	D	L	GF	GA	GD	Pts	Qualification
1	Go Ahead	19	14	0	5	64	34	+30	28	Qualified for Championship play-off
2	PEC Zwolle	19	11	4	4	54	31	+23	26	
3	Heracles	18	11	3	4	52	37	+15	25	
4	SC Enschede	18	7	5	6	34	31	+3	19	
5	FC Wageningen	18	7	3	8	37	36	+1	17	
6	AGOVV Apeldoorn	18	8	0	10	42	34	+8	16	
7	HVV Tubantia	18	5	5	8	41	50	−9	15	
8	ZAC	18	4	5	9	29	46	−17	13	
9	Vitesse Arnhem	18	5	2	11	28	58	−30	12	
10	Robur et Velocitas	18	5	1	12	38	62	−24	11	

Source: rsssf.com

=== Eerste Klasse North ===
Pos	Team	Pld	W	D	L	GF	GA	GD	Pts	Qualification or relegation
1	Velocitas 1897	18	16	1	1	85	23	+62	33	Qualified for Championship play-off
2	Veendam	18	11	2	5	59	28	+31	24	
3	VV Leeuwarden	18	10	3	5	54	33	+21	23	
4	MVV Alcides	18	8	0	10	38	49	−11	16	
5	LAC Frisia 1883	18	7	2	9	33	60	−27	16	
6	Be Quick 1887	18	7	1	10	43	42	+1	15	
7	Achilles 1894	18	7	1	10	33	48	−15	15	
8	GVAV Rapiditas	18	6	1	11	43	60	−17	13	
9	LVV Friesland	18	4	5	9	35	55	−20	13	
10	Meppeler Sport Club	18	5	2	11	35	60	−25	12	Relegated to 2nd Division

Source: rsssf.com

=== Eerste Klasse South ===
Pos	Team	Pld	W	D	L	GF	GA	GD	Pts	Qualification or relegation
1	PSV Eindhoven	18	14	1	3	75	34	+41	29	Qualified for Championship play-off
2	NAC	18	9	5	4	50	45	+5	23	
3	Willem II	18	10	2	6	69	59	+10	22	
4	NOAD	18	9	3	6	51	35	+16	21	
5	FC Eindhoven	18	9	2	7	52	47	+5	20	
6	LONGA	18	8	0	10	40	55	−15	16	
7	De Valk	18	7	1	10	38	55	−17	15	
8	BVV Den Bosch	18	5	4	9	58	74	−16	14	
9	MVV Maastricht	18	5	3	10	36	36	0	13	
10	RKVV Wilhelmina	18	3	1	14	28	57	−29	7	Relegated to 2nd Division

Source: rsssf.com

=== Eerste Klasse West-I ===
Pos	Team	Pld	W	D	L	GF	GA	GD	Pts	Qualification or relegation
1	AFC Ajax	18	14	3	1	75	20	+55	31	Qualified for Championship play-off
2	ZFC	18	10	6	2	49	30	+19	26	Division West-II next season
3	Stormvogels	18	7	6	5	39	28	+11	20	
4	DFC	18	8	3	7	37	44	−7	19	Division West-II next season
5	HBS Craeyenhout	18	6	6	6	43	38	+5	18	
6	Hermes DVS	18	5	7	6	40	48	−8	17	
7	HVV 't Gooi	18	6	3	9	37	48	−11	15	
8	VUC	18	4	4	10	37	65	−28	12	Division West-II next season
9	Koninklijke HFC	18	3	6	9	20	38	−18	12	Division West-II next season
10	SBV Excelsior	18	2	6	10	37	55	−18	10	Relegated to 2nd Division

Source: rsssf.com

=== Eerste Klasse West-II ===
Pos	Team	Pld	W	D	L	GF	GA	GD	Pts	Qualification or relegation
1	Feijenoord	18	13	2	3	50	17	+33	28	Qualified for Championship play-off
2	Sparta Rotterdam	18	12	3	3	34	16	+18	27	Division West-I next season
3	ADO Den Haag	18	8	3	7	41	38	+3	19	
4	FC Hilversum	18	9	1	8	31	29	+2	19	
5	VSV	18	7	2	9	26	28	−2	16	
6	KFC	18	6	4	8	37	41	−4	16	Division West-I next season
7	HVV Den Haag	18	6	3	9	25	43	−18	15	Division West-I next season
8	RCH	18	6	2	10	32	43	−11	14	Division West-I next season
9	Blauw-Wit Amsterdam	18	5	3	10	25	32	−7	13	
10	HFC EDO	18	6	1	11	28	42	−14	13	Relegated to 2nd Division

Source: rsssf.com

=== Championship play-off ===
Pos	Team	Pld	W	D	L	GF	GA	GD	Pts	AJA	FEY	PSV	GOA	VEL
1	AFC Ajax	8	5	2	1	29	15	+14	12		2–2	4–2	2–0	7–0
2	Feijenoord	8	3	2	3	17	15	+2	8	5–2		2–1	2–2	2–0
3	PSV Eindhoven	8	4	0	4	21	21	0	8	2–5	3–1		5–2	5–0
4	Go Ahead	8	2	2	4	17	22	−5	6	2–5	3–2	0–2		5–1
5	Velocitas 1897	8	2	2	4	15	26	−11	6	2–2	2–1	7–1	3–3	

Source: rsssf.com
