= Peer Krom =

Dutch footballer (1898–1965)

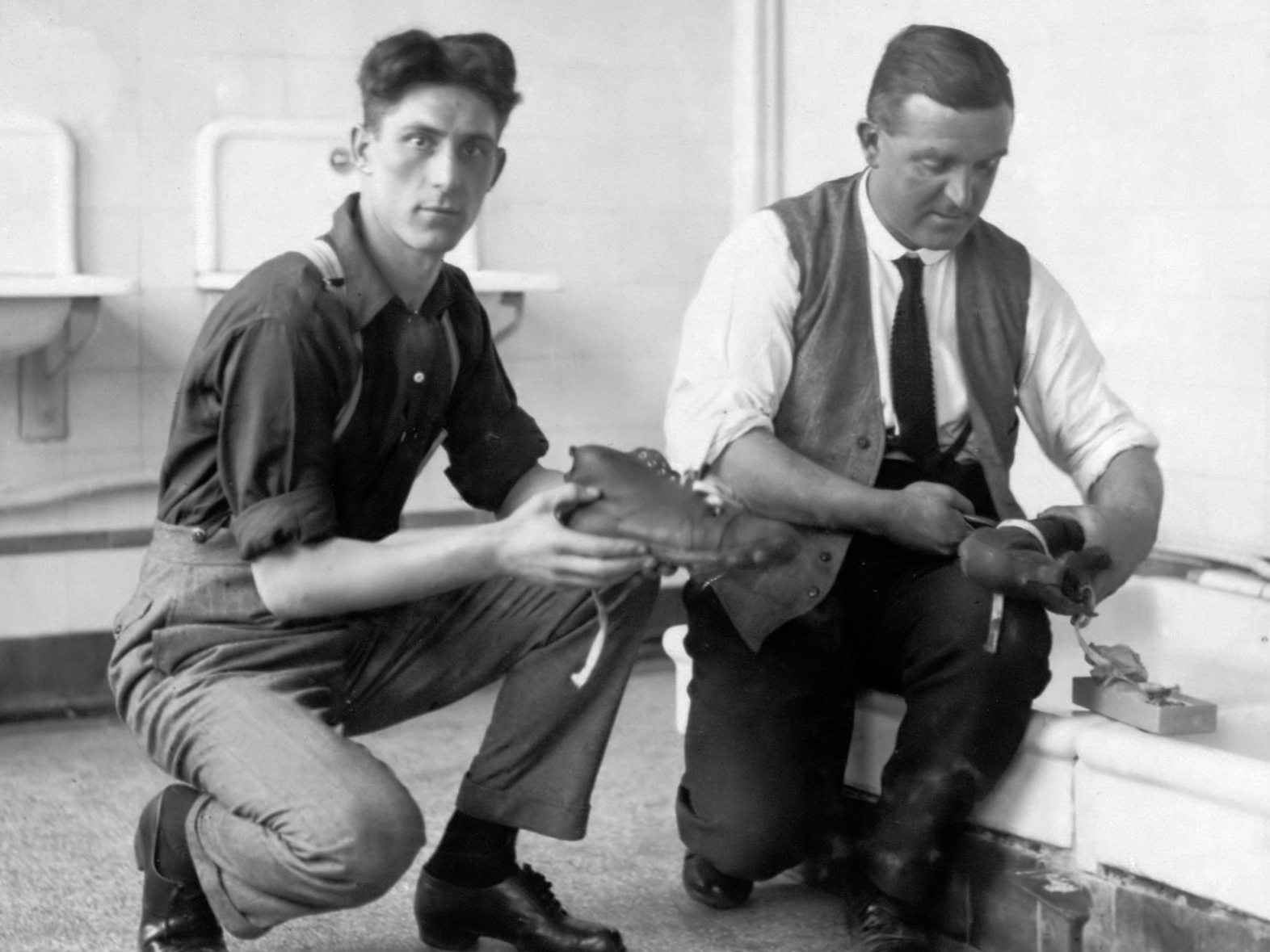
- Krom (left) with Bob Glendenning in 1923

Personal information
- Full name: Gerardus Johannes Krom
- Date of birth: 10 March 1898
- Place of birth: Haarlem, Netherlands
- Date of death: 15 December 1965 (aged 67)
- Place of death: Beverwijk, Netherlands

Senior career*
Years	Team	Apps	(Gls)
1915–1930	RCH		

International career
1924–1928	Netherlands	14	(1)
- * Club domestic league appearances and goals

Gerardus Johannes "Peer" Krom (10 March 1898 – 15 December 1965) was a Dutch footballer. He competed in the men's tournament at the 1924 Summer Olympics.

At club level, Krom spent his career with RCH, where he won the national championship in the 1922–23 season.

== Honours ==
RCH

- Netherlands Football League Championship: 1922–23
