= Bulder =

Bulder is a surname. Notable people with the surname include:

- Evert Jan Bulder (1894–1973), Dutch footballer
- Jaap Bulder (1896–1979), Dutch footballer
