= Tetzner =

Tetzner is a German surname that may refer to

- Hans Tetzner (1898–1987), Dutch association football player
- Heinz Tetzner (1920–2007), German expressionist painter and printmaker
- Lisa Tetzner (1894–1963), German-born Swiss children's writer
- Max Tetzner (1896–1932), Dutch association football player, brother of Hans
