= Bertus Freese =

Dutch footballer (1902–1959)

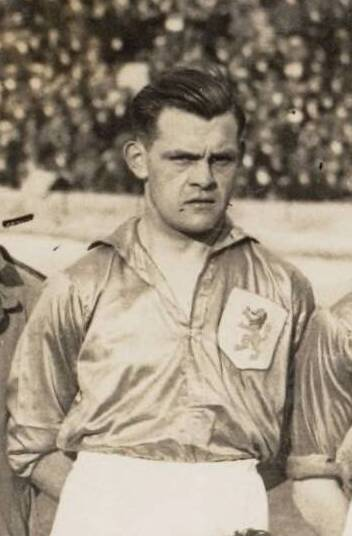
- Freese (Olympics, 1928)

Personal information
- Full name: Bertus Johannes Freese
- Date of birth: 20 February 1902
- Place of birth: Almelo, Netherlands
- Date of death: 21 November 1959 (aged 57)
- Place of death: Almelo, Netherlands

Senior career*
Years	Team	Apps	(Gls)
- Heracles

International career
1928	Netherlands	1	(0)
- * Club domestic league appearances and goals

Bertus Freese (20 February 1902 – 21 November 1959) was a Dutch footballer. He competed in the men's tournament at the 1928 Summer Olympics. During his career, he played for Heracles where he was part of the title-winning team in 1926–27.

== Honours ==
Heracles

- Netherlands Football League Championship: 1926–27
