= 1925–26 Netherlands Football League Championship =

Netherl. Football Championship
- Season: 1925–1926
- Champions: SC Enschede (1st title)

The Netherlands Football League Championship 1925–1926 was contested by 50 teams participating in five divisions. The national champion would be determined by a play-off featuring the winners of the eastern, northern, southern and two western football divisions of the Netherlands. SC Enschede won this year's championship by beating MVV Maastricht, Feijenoord, Stormvogels and Be Quick 1887.

== New entrants ==
Eerste Klasse East:

- Promoted from 2nd Division: DOTO Deventer

Eerste Klasse North:

- Promoted from 2nd Division: HSC

Eerste Klasse South:

- Promoted from 2nd Division: RFC Roermond
- Bredania/'t Zesde was the result of a merger between 't Zesde and last seasons competitor Bredania

Eerste Klasse West-I:

- Moving in from West-II: DFC, HVV Den Haag, RCH, Stormvogels and VOC

Eerste Klasse West-II:

- Moving in from West-I: Ajax Sportsman Combinatie, Feijenoord, HFC Haarlem and ZFC
- Promoted from 2nd Division: De Spartaan

== Divisions ==
=== Eerste Klasse Oost ===
Pos	Team	Pld	W	D	L	GF	GA	GD	Pts	Qualification or relegation
1	SC Enschede	18	13	2	3	56	19	+37	28	Qualified for Championship play-off
2	Heracles	18	12	2	4	54	28	+26	26	
3	Go Ahead	18	12	2	4	46	25	+21	26	
4	Vitesse Arnhem	18	8	2	8	41	42	−1	18	
5	Wageningen	18	5	6	7	37	40	−3	16	
6	Enschedese Boys	18	6	3	9	30	38	−8	15	
7	DOTO (Deventer)	18	5	4	9	38	50	−12	14	
8	Hengelo	18	4	5	9	40	58	−18	13	
9	ZAC (Zwolle)	18	5	2	11	34	49	−15	12	
10	Quick Nijmegen	18	5	2	11	34	61	−27	12	Relegated after losing play-off against ZAC

=== Eerste Klasse North ===
Pos	Team	Pld	W	D	L	GF	GA	GD	Pts	Qualification or relegation
1	Be Quick 1887	18	16	1	1	94	16	+78	33	Qualified for Championship play-off
2	Velocitas 1897	18	16	0	2	72	26	+46	32	
3	LAC Frisia 1883	18	10	4	4	37	27	+10	24	
4	GVV Groningen	18	6	4	8	29	51	−22	16	
5	WVV Winschoten	18	5	5	8	40	50	−10	15	
6	VV Leeuwarden	18	6	2	10	29	43	−14	14	
7	Veendam	18	5	4	9	27	42	−15	14	
8	LVV Friesland	18	6	1	11	40	59	−19	13	
9	Achilles 1894	18	6	0	12	39	50	−11	12	
10	HSC	18	2	3	13	25	68	−43	7	Relegated to 2nd Division

Source: rsssf.com

=== Eerste Klasse South ===
Pos	Team	Pld	W	D	L	GF	GA	GD	Pts	Qualification or relegation
1	MVV Maastricht	18	13	4	1	52	23	+29	30	Qualified for Championship play-off
2	RKVV Wilhelmina	18	12	2	4	31	25	+6	26	
3	NAC	18	10	4	4	44	25	+19	24	
4	NOAD	18	7	4	7	36	24	+12	18	
5	FC Eindhoven	18	6	6	6	35	36	−1	18	
6	RFC Roermond	18	6	5	7	31	39	−8	17	
7	Willem II	18	5	4	9	28	47	−19	14	
8	BVV Den Bosch	18	6	1	11	31	38	−7	13	
9	Bredania/'t Zesde	18	4	3	11	20	33	−13	11	
10	De Valk	18	4	1	13	34	52	−18	9	Relegated to 2nd Division

Source: rsssf.com

=== Eerste Klasse West-I ===
Pos	Team	Pld	W	D	L	GF	GA	GD	Pts	Qualification or relegation
1	Stormvogels	18	12	3	3	43	22	+21	27	Qualified for Championship play-off
2	Sparta Rotterdam	18	12	2	4	53	19	+34	26	
3	VOC	18	9	5	4	43	48	−5	23	Division West-II next season
4	Koninklijke HFC	18	8	5	5	41	38	+3	21	Division West-II next season
5	Blauw-Wit Amsterdam	18	9	1	8	42	39	+3	19	
6	HVV 't Gooi	18	5	6	7	47	42	+5	16	
7	DFC	18	7	2	9	58	65	−7	16	
8	RCH	18	5	6	7	38	44	−6	16	
9	HVV Den Haag	18	5	2	11	43	45	−2	12	
10	GVV Unitas	18	0	4	14	18	64	−46	4	Relegated to 2nd Division

Source: rsssf.com

=== Eerste Klasse West-II ===
Pos	Team	Pld	W	D	L	GF	GA	GD	Pts	Qualification or relegation
1	Feijenoord	18	9	5	4	47	29	+18	23	Qualified for Championship play-off
2	SBV Excelsior	18	9	5	4	42	28	+14	23	Division West-I next season
3	HFC EDO	18	9	4	5	34	20	+14	22	
4	AFC Ajax	18	9	4	5	43	27	+16	22	Division West-I next season
5	HBS Craeyenhout	18	9	4	5	46	38	+8	22	
6	ZFC	18	7	6	5	38	42	−4	20	
7	De Spartaan	18	7	1	10	38	44	−6	15	
8	Ajax Sportsman Combinatie	18	6	2	10	34	53	−19	14	
9	UVV Utrecht	18	5	3	10	31	51	−20	13	
10	HFC Haarlem	18	2	2	14	32	53	−21	6	Relegated to 2nd Division

Source: rsssf.com

=== Championship play-off ===
Pos	Team	Pld	W	D	L	GF	GA	GD	Pts	ENS	MVV	FEY	STO	BEQ
1	SC Enschede	8	6	2	0	25	11	+14	14		4–2	4–1	3–1	3–3
2	MVV Maastricht	8	5	0	3	22	16	+6	10	1–3		4–2	2–1	6–1
3	Feijenoord	8	3	2	3	20	20	0	8	2–3	3–0		2–2	4–2
4	Stormvogels	8	1	2	5	11	17	−6	4	1–1	1–3	2–3		1–2
5	Be Quick 1887	8	1	2	5	13	27	−14	4	0–4	1–4	3–3	1–2	

Source: rsssf.com
