= 1932–33 Netherlands Football League Championship =

Netherl. Football Championship
- Season: 1932–1933
- Champions: Go Ahead (4th title)

The Netherlands Football League Championship 1932–1933 was contested by 50 teams participating in five divisions. The national champion would be determined by a play-off featuring the winners of the eastern, northern, southern and two western football divisions of the Netherlands. Go Ahead won this year's championship by beating Feijenoord, Stormvogels, PSV Eindhoven and Velocitas 1897.

== New entrants ==
Eerste Klasse East:

- Promoted from 2nd Division: Enschedese Boys

Eerste Klasse North:

- Promoted from 2nd Division: Sneek Wit Zwart

Eerste Klasse South:

- Promoted from 2nd Division: Zeelandia Middelburg

Eerste Klasse West-I:

- Moving in from West-II: ADO Den Haag, Feijenoord, FC Hilversum, VSV and ZFC
- Promoted from 2nd Division: DHC

Eerste Klasse West-II:

- Moving in from West-I: AFC Ajax, Sparta Rotterdam, Stormvogels, West Frisia and KFC
- Promoted from 2nd Division: HFC Haarlem

== Divisions ==
=== Eerste Klasse East ===
Pos	Team	Pld	W	D	L	GF	GA	GD	Pts	Qualification or relegation
1	Go Ahead	18	12	3	3	47	18	+29	27	Qualified for Championship play-off
2	PEC Zwolle	18	11	4	3	42	26	+16	26	
3	SC Enschede	18	8	4	6	37	31	+6	20	
4	Vitesse Arnhem	18	8	4	6	39	35	+4	20	
5	Heracles	18	8	1	9	39	34	+5	17	
6	Enschedese Boys	18	5	6	7	35	40	−5	16	
7	AGOVV Apeldoorn	18	5	5	8	33	36	−3	15	
8	HVV Tubantia	18	6	2	10	29	42	−13	14	
9	FC Wageningen	18	3	7	8	27	39	−12	13	
10	Robur et Velocitas	18	5	2	11	29	56	−27	12	Relegated to 2nd Division

Source: rsssf.com

=== Eerste Klasse North ===
Pos	Team	Pld	W	D	L	GF	GA	GD	Pts	Qualification
1	Velocitas 1897	18	15	1	2	86	33	+53	31	Qualified for Championship play-off
2	VV Leeuwarden	18	9	2	7	42	34	+8	20	
3	Veendam	17	9	2	6	51	47	+4	20	
4	Achilles 1894	18	8	3	7	43	48	−5	19	
5	LAC Frisia 1883	17	6	5	6	40	50	−10	17	
6	Be Quick 1887	17	6	4	7	54	44	+10	16	
7	GVAV Rapiditas	18	5	5	8	55	53	+2	15	
8	Sneek Wit Zwart	18	5	5	8	38	41	−3	15	
9	MVV Alcides	17	6	1	10	42	61	−19	13	
10	LVV Friesland	18	3	4	11	27	67	−40	10	

Source: rsssf.com

=== Eerste Klasse South ===
Pos	Team	Pld	W	D	L	GF	GA	GD	Pts	Qualification
1	PSV Eindhoven	18	10	5	3	44	21	+23	25	Qualified for Championship play-off
2	MVV Maastricht	18	10	2	6	52	43	+9	22	
3	FC Eindhoven	18	9	3	6	43	36	+7	21	
4	LONGA	18	8	4	6	42	35	+7	20	
5	NAC	18	8	3	7	46	45	+1	19	
6	NOAD	18	5	7	6	33	41	−8	17	
7	Bleijerheide	18	6	4	8	35	35	0	16	
8	Willem II	18	4	7	7	36	39	−3	15	
9	BVV Den Bosch	18	3	7	8	37	53	−16	13	
10	Zeelandia Middelburg	18	4	4	10	38	58	−20	12	

Source: rsssf.com

=== Eerste Klasse West-I ===
Pos	Team	Pld	W	D	L	GF	GA	GD	Pts	Qualification or relegation
1	Feijenoord	18	13	3	2	52	25	+27	29	Qualified for Championship play-off
2	HBS Craeyenhout	18	9	3	6	41	34	+7	21	Division West-II next season
3	ADO Den Haag	18	7	3	8	36	33	+3	17	
4	RCH	18	7	3	8	40	41	−1	17	Division West-II next season
5	Hermes DVS	18	7	3	8	39	41	−2	17	
6	DHC	18	7	3	8	49	56	−7	17	Division West-II next season
7	HVV 't Gooi	18	6	5	7	30	44	−14	17	
8	ZFC	18	6	4	8	38	37	+1	16	
9	VSV	18	6	4	8	40	49	−9	16	
10	Blauw-Wit Amsterdam	18	3	7	8	34	39	−5	13	Relegated to 2nd Division

Source: rsssf.com

=== Eerste Klasse West-II ===
Pos	Team	Pld	W	D	L	GF	GA	GD	Pts	Qualification or relegation
1	Stormvogels	18	14	1	3	66	23	+43	29	Qualified for Championship play-off
2	AFC Ajax	18	10	4	4	55	37	+18	24	Division West-I next season
3	Sparta Rotterdam	18	10	3	5	49	41	+8	23	Division West-I next season
4	FC Hilversum	18	8	3	7	43	53	−10	19	
5	KFC	18	7	3	8	41	39	+2	17	
6	Xerxes	18	6	5	7	50	51	−1	17	
7	DFC	18	6	4	8	54	51	+3	16	
8	HFC Haarlem	18	6	2	10	52	68	−16	14	Division West-I next season
9	VUC	18	5	2	11	46	64	−18	12	
10	West Frisia	18	3	3	12	32	61	−29	9	Relegated to 2nd Division

Source: rsssf.com

=== Championship play-off ===
Pos	Team	Pld	W	D	L	GF	GA	GD	Pts	GOA	FEY	STO	PSV	VEL
1	Go Ahead	8	5	1	2	23	13	+10	11		4–0	4–3	3–0	4–5
2	Feijenoord	8	4	2	2	21	14	+7	10	1–1		4–0	2–1	2–0
3	Stormvogels	8	3	2	3	16	18	−2	8	1–2	2–2		3–1	1–0
4	PSV Eindhoven	8	3	0	5	18	25	−7	6	2–1	3–8	2–3		5–4
5	Velocitas 1897	8	2	1	5	17	25	−8	5	1–4	3–2	3–3	1–4	

Source: rsssf.com
