= 1952–53 Netherlands Football League Championship =

Netherl. Football Championship
- Season: 1952–1953
- Champions: RCH (2nd title)

The Netherlands Football League Championship 1952–1953 was contested by 56 teams participating in four divisions. The national champion would be determined by a play-off featuring the winners of each division of the Netherlands. RCH won this year's championship by beating FC Eindhoven, Sparta Rotterdam and Vitesse Arnhem.

== New entrants ==
Eerste Klasse A:

- Moving in from other divisions: AFC Ajax, DOS, NEC Nijmegen, RCH, Sneek Wit Zwart, VSV, FC Wageningen and Zwolsche Boys
- Promoted from 2nd Division: Heracles

Eerste Klasse B:

- Moving in from other divisions: AGOVV Apeldoorn, DWS, Elinkwijk, Go Ahead, HVV 't Gooi, HFC Haarlem and sc Heerenveen
- Promoted from 2nd Division: Stormvogels

Eerste Klasse C:

- Moving in from other divisions: Brabantia, Emma, HBS Craeyenhout, LONGA, Sparta Rotterdam, Theole and VVV Venlo
- Promoted from 2nd Division: SBV Excelsior

Eerste Klasse D:

- Moving in from other divisions: ADO Den Haag, Bleijerheide, DHC Delft, FC Eindhoven, Feijenoord, NAC and RBC Roosendaal
- Promoted from 2nd Division: TEC Tiel

== Divisions ==
=== Eerste Klasse A ===
Pos	Team	Pld	W	D	L	GF	GA	GD	Pts	Qualification or relegation
1	RCH	26	16	7	3	49	21	+28	39	Qualified for Championship play-off
2	VSV	26	13	6	7	50	34	+16	32	Transferred to Eerste B
3	AFC Ajax	26	12	6	8	53	40	+13	30	
4	HFC EDO	26	11	7	8	30	32	−2	29	Transferred to Eerste B
5	DOS	26	13	2	11	62	49	+13	28	Transferred to Eerste B
6	FC Wageningen	26	7	14	5	30	28	+2	28	
7	Heracles	26	9	8	9	51	51	0	26	
8	GVAV Rapiditas	26	9	6	11	47	47	0	24	Transferred to Eerste B
9	Enschedese Boys	26	9	6	11	40	47	−7	24	
10	NEC Nijmegen	26	8	7	11	31	39	−8	23	
11	Sneek Wit Zwart	26	7	8	11	31	45	−14	22	Transferred to Eerste B
12	De Volewijckers	26	9	3	14	41	43	−2	21	Transferred to Eerste B
13	Zwolsche Boys	26	7	6	13	34	58	−24	20	
14	LAC Frisia 1883	26	5	8	13	32	47	−15	18	Relegated to 2nd Division

Source: rsssf.com

=== Eerste Klasse B ===
Pos	Team	Pld	W	D	L	GF	GA	GD	Pts	Qualification or relegation
1	Vitesse Arnhem	26	16	4	6	43	32	+11	36	Qualified for Championship play-off
2	Stormvogels	26	15	4	7	66	33	+33	34	Transferred to Eerste A
3	sc Heerenveen	26	15	4	7	59	40	+19	34	
4	HFC Haarlem	26	13	8	5	44	32	+12	34	Transferred to Eerste A
5	SC Enschede	26	12	6	8	47	44	+3	30	
6	DWS	26	11	5	10	46	36	+10	27	Transferred to Eerste A
7	VV Leeuwarden	26	11	4	11	52	42	+10	26	
8	Elinkwijk	26	11	3	12	35	40	−5	25	Transferred to Eerste A
9	Blauw-Wit Amsterdam	26	9	6	11	32	32	0	24	Transferred to Eerste A
10	HVV 't Gooi	26	8	7	11	35	39	−4	23	
11	AGOVV Apeldoorn	26	8	6	12	41	49	−8	22	
12	Be Quick 1887	26	8	6	12	48	67	−19	22	Transferred to Eerste A
13	Go Ahead	26	5	6	15	32	50	−18	16	
14	Achilles 1894	26	3	5	18	29	73	−44	11	Relegated to 2nd Division

Source: rsssf.com

=== Eerste Klasse C ===
Pos	Team	Pld	W	D	L	GF	GA	GD	Pts	Qualification or relegation
1	Sparta Rotterdam	26	18	4	4	57	25	+32	40	Qualified for Championship play-off
2	Willem II	26	17	5	4	79	40	+39	39	Transferred to Eerste D
3	BVV Den Bosch	26	13	7	6	53	26	+27	33	
4	SBV Excelsior	26	13	6	7	65	42	+23	32	Transferred to Eerste D
5	VVV Venlo	26	11	7	8	41	38	+3	29	
6	MVV Maastricht	26	10	8	8	49	36	+13	28	Transferred to Eerste D
7	Emma	26	10	5	11	52	53	−1	25	
8	Sittardia	26	11	3	12	59	70	−11	25	
9	SVV	26	11	1	14	50	59	−9	23	
10	LONGA	26	11	1	14	43	57	−14	23	
11	Brabantia	26	9	2	15	44	52	−8	20	
12	Juliana	26	5	8	13	30	52	−22	18	Transferred to Eerste D
13	HBS Craeyenhout	26	6	4	16	47	70	−23	16	
14	Theole	26	4	5	17	36	85	−49	13	Relegated to 2nd Division

Source: rsssf.com

=== Eerste Klasse D ===
Pos	Team	Pld	W	D	L	GF	GA	GD	Pts	Qualification or relegation
1	FC Eindhoven	27	17	5	5	47	22	+25	39	Qualified for Championship play-off
2	PSV Eindhoven	27	16	5	6	61	34	+27	37	Transferred to Eerste C
3	ADO Den Haag	26	13	6	7	43	31	+12	32	
4	Bleijerheide	26	11	6	9	46	32	+14	28	Transferred to Eerste C
5	Feijenoord	26	9	9	8	45	43	+2	27	
6	NAC	26	11	5	10	46	47	−1	27	Transferred to Eerste C
7	Limburgia	26	10	5	11	37	38	−1	25	
8	Hermes DVS	26	9	7	10	47	57	−10	25	
9	NOAD	26	8	7	11	37	42	−5	23	
10	Xerxes	26	7	9	10	42	51	−9	23	Transferred to Eerste C
11	RBC Roosendaal	26	10	2	14	44	50	−6	22	
12	DHC Delft	26	9	4	13	48	67	−19	22	
13	Maurits	26	6	7	13	47	57	−10	19	
14	TEC Tiel	26	6	5	15	41	60	−19	17	Relegated to 2nd Division

Source: rsssf.com

=== Championship play-off ===
Pos	Team	Pld	W	D	L	GF	GA	GD	Pts	Result	RCH	EIN	SPA	VIT
1	RCH	6	3	1	2	8	7	+1	7	Champion		0–2	2–2	2–1
2	FC Eindhoven	6	3	1	2	13	8	+5	7		0–2		0–2	6–0
3	Sparta Rotterdam	6	2	2	2	11	8	+3	6		1–1	0–1		1–2
4	Vitesse Arnhem	6	1	2	3	10	19	−9	4		1–1	4–4	2–5	

Source: rsssf.com

=== Play-off ===
Team 1	Score	Team 2
RCH	2–1	FC Eindhoven

RCH won the championship.
