= Leo Halle =

Dutch footballer (1906–1992)

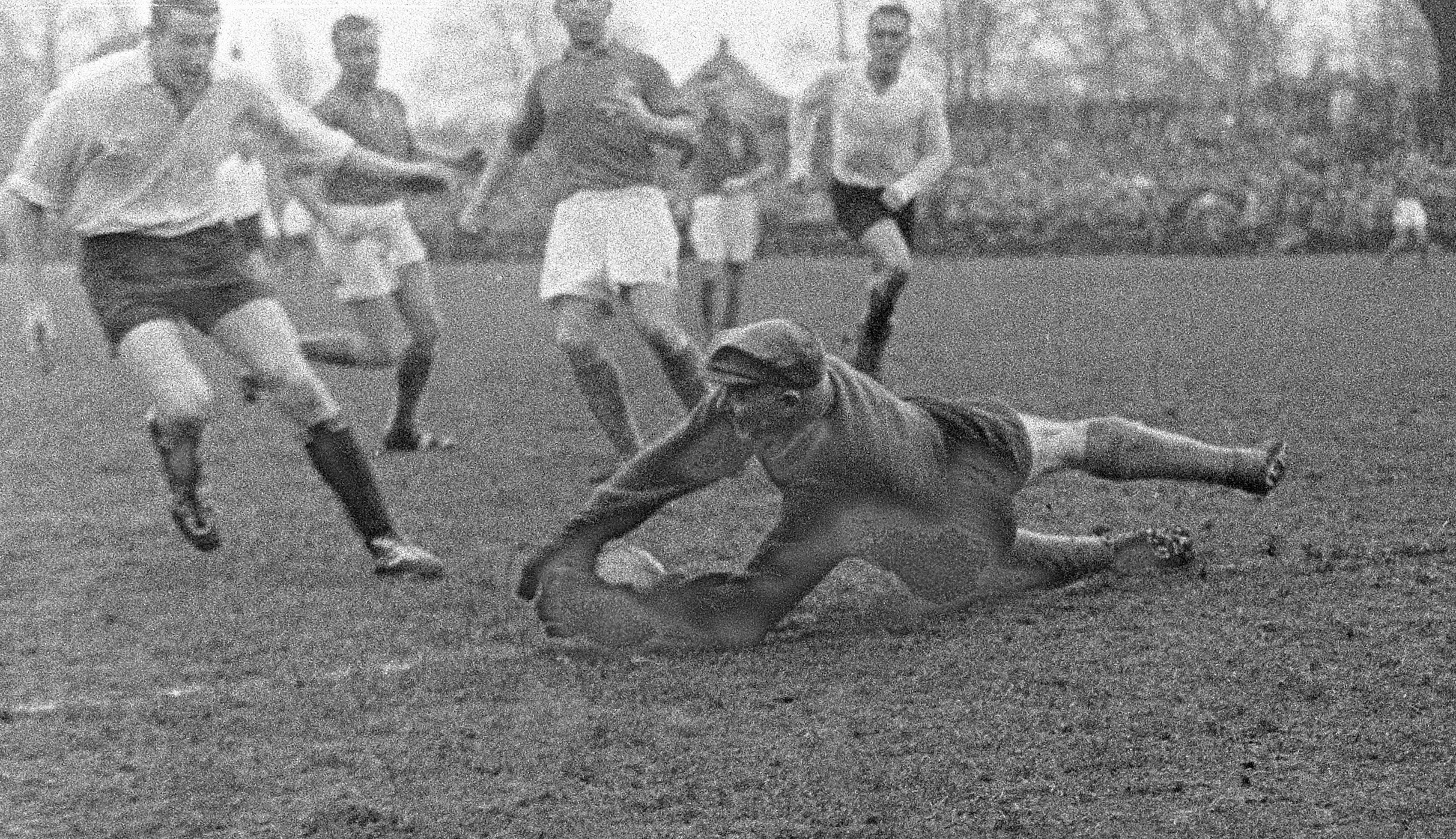

Personal information
- Full name: Leonard Herman Gerrit Halle
- Date of birth: 26 January 1906
- Place of birth: Deventer, Netherlands
- Date of death: 15 June 1992 (aged 86)
- Place of death: Deventer, Netherlands
- Position: Goalkeeper

Senior career*
Years	Team	Apps	(Gls)
1923-1939	Go Ahead		

International career
1928–1937	Netherlands	15	(0)
- * Club domestic league appearances and goals

Leonard Herman Gerrit Halle (26 January 1906 – 15 June 1992) was a Dutch football goalkeeper who played for Netherlands in the 1934 FIFA World Cup.

Halle played his entire career for hometown club Go Ahead and won the 1933 league title with the club as well as the one in 1930.

== Personal life ==
Born in Deventer, he was a younger brother of fellow international player Jan Halle and was married to Alberdina Steenbruggen.

Nicknamed De Leeuw van Deventer, a statue of Halle outside the Go Ahead Eagles stadium was unveiled in 2020.
