= 1955–56 Eerste Klasse =

Eerste Klasse
- Season: 1955-1956
- Champions: RCH Heemstede; Hermes DVS; Kooger Football Club

1955–56 Eerste Klasse was a Dutch soccer season of the Eerste Klasse division. It was the first season in which the Eerste Klasse was no longer the senior competition of the Netherlands, as a professional Hoofdklasse had been created just above. The Eerste Klasse continued as professional soccer, also in the 1955–56 season.

There were three Eerste Klasse sections: A, B, and C. A and B had 14 teams each, C had 16 teams.

Section champions were:

- A – RCH Heemstede
- B – Hermes DVS
- C – Kooger Football Club (now AZ Alkmaar)
