= Leo Ghering =

Dutch footballer

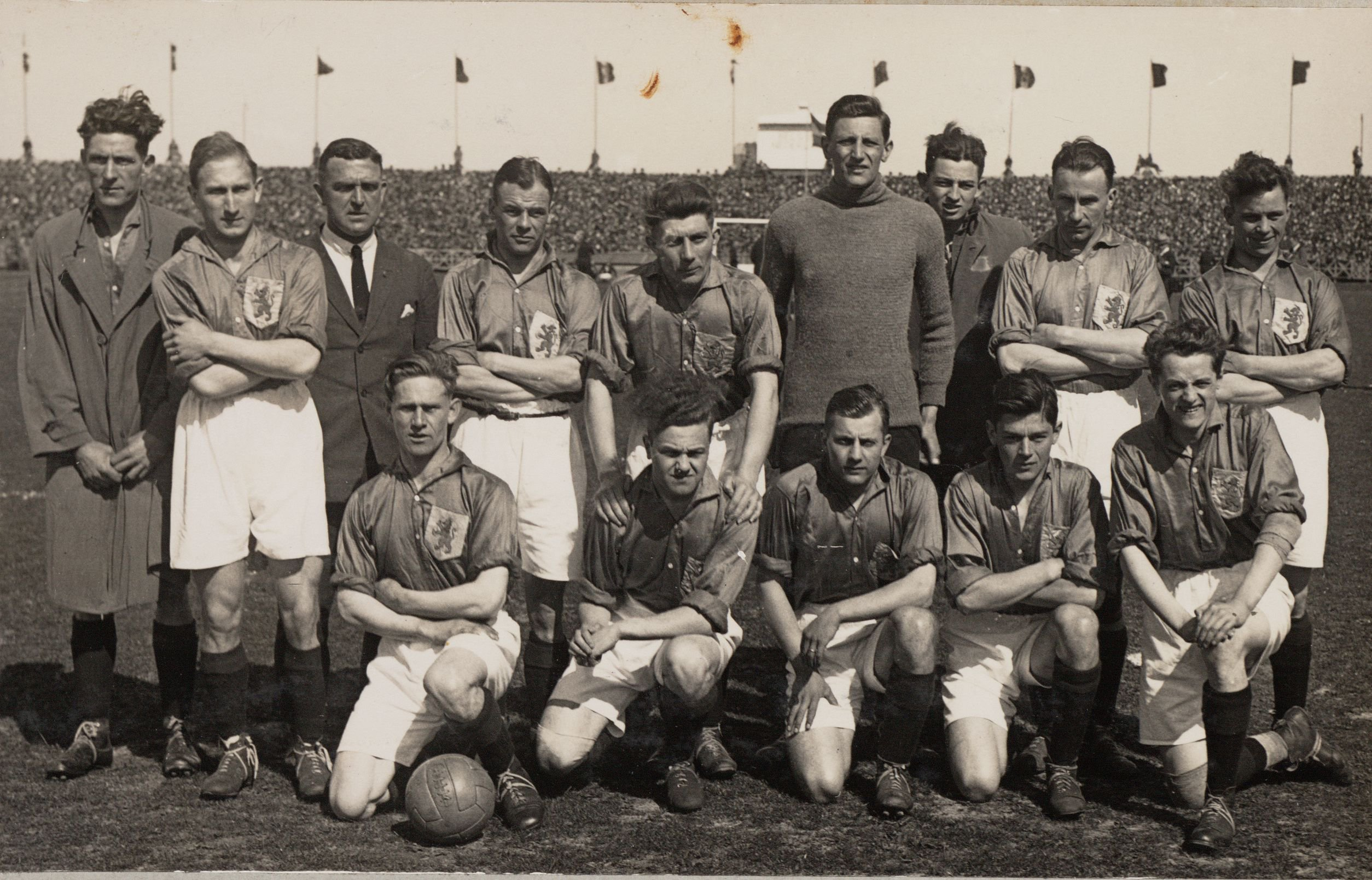
- Ghering (kneeling, far right) at the international match Netherlands – Belgium in 1927

Personal information
- Full name: Leonardus Franciscus Ghering
- Date of birth: 19 August 1900
- Place of birth: Tilburg, Netherlands
- Date of death: 1 April 1966 (aged 65)
- Place of death: Tilburg, Netherlands

Senior career*
| Years | Team | Apps | (Gls) |
| 1920–1921 | LONGA | | |
| 1921–1924 | Willem II | 55 | (57) |
| 1924–1934 | LONGA | | |

International career
| 1927–1928 | Netherlands | 9 | (6) |
- * Club domestic league appearances and goals

Leonardus Franciscus Ghering (19 August 1900 – 1 April 1966) was a Dutch footballer who played as a striker. He competed in the men's tournament at the 1928 Summer Olympics for the Netherlands.

== Club career ==
Born in Tilburg, Ghering spent almost his entire football career representing hometown club LONGA, with which he won the 1925–26 KNVB Cup. Ghering was presumably a part of LONGA from the club's foundation in 1920 or shortly thereafter. In the 1926 cup final against De Spartaan from Amsterdam he scored the 3–0 and the 4–0 goals on the way to a 5–2 win. From 1921 to 1924, Ghering played for Willem II, another club from Tilburg, where he won the Eerste Klasse South in 1922–23.

In 1927, Ghering was promoted to the Eerste Klasse South with LONGA, after he had returned to the club in 1924.

== International career ==
Ghering made his debut in the Netherlands national team on 18 April 1927, gaining a total of 9 caps until 4 November 1928. He scored 6 goals. In addition to Oranje, he also played for the Southern Netherlands national team and the Olympic team.

== Style of play ==
Ghering was a "quick and tactical" striker, renowned for his powerful striking ability, with either foot.

== Honours ==
LONGA

- KNVB Cup: 1925–26

Willem II

- Eerste Klasse South: 1922–23
