= Jan Halle =

Dutch footballer

Personal information
- Date of birth: 17 February 1903
- Place of birth: Deventer, Netherlands
- Date of death: 6 January 1986 (aged 82)
- Place of death: Zaanstad, Netherlands
- Position: Midfielder

Senior career*
Years	Team	Apps	(Gls)
1921–1939	Go Ahead		

International career
1929	Netherlands	2	(0)
- * Club domestic league appearances and goals

Jan Halle (17 February 1903 – 6 January 1986) was a Dutch footballer. He played in two matches for the Netherlands national football team in 1929.

Halle played his entire career for Go Ahead and won the 1933 league title with the club. He was part of the team that played a record 20 successive games without defeat in 1923.

He was a brother of fellow international player Leo Halle and after retiring as a player Jan coached amateur side VV Vorden among others.
