= Vilmos Halpern =

Hungarian football manager (1910–1969)

Personal information
- Full name: Vilmos Halpern-Hawas III
- Date of birth: 12 February 1910
- Place of birth: Budapest, Austria-Hungary
- Date of death: 27 September 1969 (aged 59)
- Place of death: Brussels, Belgium

Managerial career
- Years: Team
- 1933: Alemannia Aachen
- 1935: SC Aachen
- 1936: RFC Roermond
- 1937: LAC Frisia 1883
- 1937–193x: LSC 1890
- 1939–193x: VUC Den Haag
- 1940–1941: Ajax
- 1941–19xx: NOAD
- 1951: FC Grenchen
- 1953–1954: İstanbulspor
- 1954–1955: Holland Sport
- 1955–1956: AC Bellinzona

Vilmos Halpern (12 February 1910 – 27 September 1969) was a Hungarian football player and manager who managed Dutch side Ajax between 1940 and 1941, before moving to Dutch amateur side NOAD.

He later managed a number of club sides in Switzerland - FC Grenchen (1951) and AC Bellinzona (1955–1956). He also coached LAC Frisia 1883, LSC 1890, VUC Den Haag, and Holland Sport.

== Personal life ==
Vilmos was born in Budapest, to Sara Izrael and Chaim Wolf Halpern. He was married to Antje Postma.
