= 1926–27 Netherlands Football League Championship =

Netherl. Football Championship
- Season: 1926–1927
- Champions: Heracles (1st title)

The Netherlands Football League Championship 1926–1927 was contested by 50 teams participating in five divisions. The national champion would be determined by a play-off featuring the winners of the eastern, northern, southern and two western football divisions of the Netherlands. Heracles won this year's championship by beating NAC, AFC Ajax, Feijenoord and Velocitas 1897.

== New entrants ==
Eerste Klasse East:

- Promoted from 2nd Division: Robur et Velocitas

Eerste Klasse North:

- Promoted from 2nd Division: GVAV

Eerste Klasse South:

- Promoted from 2nd Division: PSV Eindhoven

Eerste Klasse West-I:

- Moving in from West-II: AFC Ajax and SBV Excelsior
- Promoted from 2nd Division: VUC

Eerste Klasse West-II:

- Moving in from West-I: Koninklijke HFC and VOC
- Promoted from 2nd Division: FC Hilversum

== Divisions ==
=== Eerste Klasse East ===
Pos	Team	Pld	W	D	L	GF	GA	GD	Pts	Qualification or relegation
1	Heracles	19	13	3	3	54	26	+28	29	Qualified for Championship play-off
2	SC Enschede	19	12	3	4	68	25	+43	27	
3	Enschedese Boys	18	9	2	7	39	44	−5	20	
4	ZAC	18	7	5	6	44	35	+9	19	
5	Vitesse Arnhem	18	7	4	7	45	42	+3	18	
6	Go Ahead	18	5	6	7	32	39	−7	16	
7	FC Wageningen	18	6	3	9	42	55	−13	15	
8	DOTO Deventer	18	5	4	9	28	44	−16	14	
9	Robur et Velocitas	18	5	3	10	33	47	−14	13	
10	HVV Hengelo	18	5	1	12	34	62	−28	11	Relegated to 2nd Division

Source: rsssf.com

=== Eerste Klasse North ===
Pos	Team	Pld	W	D	L	GF	GA	GD	Pts	Qualification or relegation
1	Velocitas 1897	18	16	0	2	79	21	+58	32	Qualified for Championship play-off
2	Be Quick 1887	18	11	1	6	63	30	+33	21 (Note: 2 points deducted)	
3	Achilles 1894	18	10	1	7	44	40	+4	21	
4	VV Leeuwarden	18	9	2	7	41	48	−7	20	
5	LVV Friesland	18	9	1	8	45	46	−1	19	
6	GVAV Rapiditas	18	7	2	9	42	45	−3	16	
7	Veendam	18	6	3	9	40	50	−10	15	
8	LAC Frisia 1883	18	5	4	9	45	64	−19	14	
9	GVV Groningen	18	6	0	12	30	52	−22	12	
10	WVV Winschoten	18	4	0	14	32	65	−33	8	Relegated to 2nd Division

Source: rsssf.com

=== Eerste Klasse South ===
Pos	Team	Pld	W	D	L	GF	GA	GD	Pts	Qualification or relegation
1	NAC	18	12	4	2	60	20	+40	28	Qualified for Championship play-off
2	MVV Maastricht	18	12	3	3	47	24	+23	27	
3	NOAD	18	9	8	1	43	17	+26	26	
4	PSV Eindhoven	18	6	7	5	37	31	+6	19	
5	Willem II	18	5	7	6	43	45	−2	17	
6	FC Eindhoven	18	4	8	6	23	24	−1	16	
7	BVV Den Bosch	18	4	7	7	24	46	−22	15	
8	RFC Roermond	18	4	6	8	29	45	−16	14	
9	RKVV Wilhelmina	18	4	3	11	24	47	−23	11	
10	Bredania/'t Zesde	18	2	3	13	10	41	−31	7	Relegated to 2nd Division

Source: rsssf.com

=== Eerste Klasse West-I ===
Pos	Team	Pld	W	D	L	GF	GA	GD	Pts	Qualification
1	AFC Ajax	18	13	1	4	49	15	+34	27	Qualified for Championship play-off
2	Stormvogels	18	10	4	4	59	35	+24	24	Division West-II next season
3	SBV Excelsior	18	8	3	7	42	44	−2	19	
4	HVV 't Gooi	18	8	2	8	51	48	+3	18	Division West-II next season
5	RCH	18	8	2	8	34	41	−7	18	
6	Sparta Rotterdam	18	8	1	9	39	36	+3	17	Division West-II next season
7	DFC	18	7	3	8	48	58	−10	17	
8	Blauw-Wit Amsterdam	18	8	1	9	34	42	−8	17	Division West-II next season
9	VUC	18	6	1	11	37	52	−15	13	
10	HVV Den Haag	18	4	2	12	30	52	−22	10	Division West-II next season

Source: rsssf.com

=== Eerste Klasse West-II ===
Pos	Team	Pld	W	D	L	GF	GA	GD	Pts	Qualification or relegation
1	Feijenoord	18	12	3	3	75	31	+44	27	Qualified for Championship play-off
2	HFC EDO	18	10	5	3	47	24	+23	25	Division West-I next season
3	FC Hilversum	18	8	7	3	43	28	+15	23	Division West-I next season
4	HBS Craeyenhout	18	9	4	5	46	35	+11	22	Division West-I next season
5	ZFC	18	8	4	6	51	54	−3	20	
6	UVV Utrecht	18	6	6	6	39	40	−1	18	Division West-I next season
7	De Spartaan	18	8	1	9	46	48	−2	17	
8	Koninklijke HFC	18	5	4	9	35	44	−9	14	
9	VOC	18	4	3	11	35	53	−18	11	Division West-I next season
10	Ajax Sportman Combinatie	18	1	1	16	25	85	−60	3	Relegated to 2nd Division

Source: rsssf.com

=== Championship play-off ===
Pos	Team	Pld	W	D	L	GF	GA	GD	Pts	HER	NAC	AJA	FEY	VEL
1	Heracles	8	6	2	0	16	5	+11	14		2–0	0–0	3–0	2–1
2	NAC	8	5	0	3	14	11	+3	10	2–3		3–1	1–0	1–0
3	AFC Ajax	8	3	2	3	14	15	−1	8	2–2	1–4		0–2	5–1
4	Feijenoord	8	3	1	4	10	10	0	7	0–2	3–1	2–3		0–0
5	Velocitas 1897	8	0	1	7	4	17	−13	1	0–2	1–2	1–2	0–3	

Source: rsssf.com
