= Siebold Sissingh =

Dutch footballer (1899–1960)

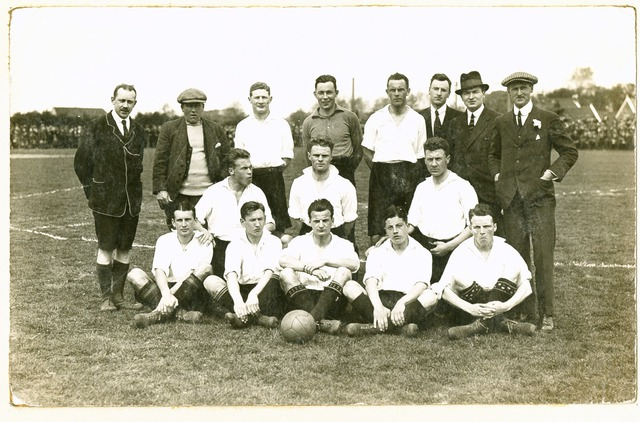
- The championship team of Be Quick in 1920. Siebold Sissingh is on the middle row, left.

Personal information
- Date of birth: July 5, 1899
- Place of birth: Groningen, Netherlands
- Date of death: May 31, 1960 (aged 60)
- Place of death: Amsterdam, Netherlands
- Positions: Right back; right midfielder

Senior career*
Years	Team	Apps	(Gls)
1915–1934	Be Quick 1887		

International career
1921	Netherlands	1	(0)

Managerial career
- 1929–1932: Be Quick 1887
- * Club domestic league appearances and goals as of 1 November 2022

Siebold Sissingh (born 5 July 1899 - 31 May 1960) was a Dutch footballer who played as a right defender or right midfielder. Sissingh was a professional wine merchant by trade.

== Career ==
Sissingh was born in Groningen in 1899 as the son of Hieronymus Jacobus Sissingh. He began his football career with GSAVV Forward. Between 1915 and 1934, he played for Be Quick 1887, winning the national championship with the team in 1920.

At the end of 1920 and the beginning of 1921, while traveling for his work as a wine buyer, Sissingh also played for several months in France with Vie au grand air du Médoc from Mérignac.

On 12 June 1921, Sissingh made his debut for the Netherlands national football team in a friendly match against Denmark, which ended in a 1–1 draw.

In 1928 he took over the family wine merchant's business "H. J. Sissingh" in Groningen. He managed to make the company grow successfully. In 1936 the business celebrated its 125 anniversary.

Between 1929 and 1932, he served as head coach of Be Quick (Groningen). He was also part of the club’s board of directors and later became an honorary member of the club.

Sissingh was married to G. Kruizinga and was father. He died on 31 May 1960 in Amsterdam at the age of 60.

A street in the Van Starkenborgh district of Groningen, the Siebold Sissinghlaan, was named in his honor.

== International statistics ==
International appearances of Siebold Sissingh
#	Date	Match	Result	Type	Goals
While playing for (Netherlands) Be Quick 1887
1	12 June 1921	Denmark – Netherlands	1–1	Friendly	0

== See also ==
- List of Netherlands international footballers
