= Jan Fransz =

Dutch footballer and coach (1937–2021)

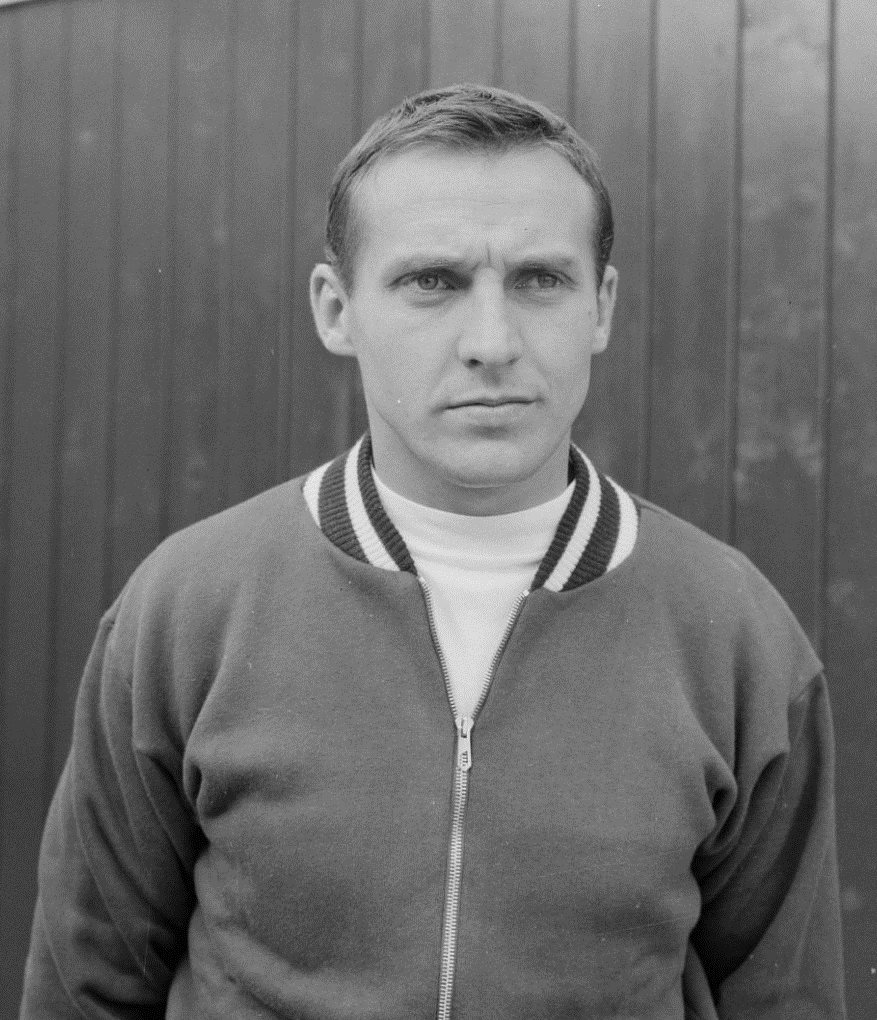
- Fransz in 1964

Personal information
- Date of birth: 24 May 1937
- Place of birth: Amsterdam, Netherlands
- Date of death: 18 December 2021 (aged 84)
- Place of death: Alkmaar, Netherlands
- Position: Midfielder

Youth career
- DVOS
- 1951–1958: Ajax

Senior career*
Years	Team	Apps	(Gls)
1958–1961	Ajax	30	(5)
1961–1964	SHS	90	(20)
1964–1965	Holland Sport	30	(7)
1965–1968	RCH	102	(14)
1968–1970	Haarlem	63	(3)
1970–1972	Blauw-Wit	54	(1)
1972–1975	FC Amsterdam	81	(5)
1975–1976	Haarlem	50	(3)
Total		500	(58)

Managerial career
- 1981–1987: AFC '34
- 1989: AZ (caretaker)
- 1995: AZ (caretaker)
- * Club domestic league appearances and goals

Jan Fransz (24 May 1937 – 18 December 2021) was a Dutch professional football player and coach.

== Career ==
Fransz played as a midfielder for DVOS, Ajax, Blauw-Wit, FC Amsterdam, RCH, HFC Haarlem, SHS and Holland Sport, retiring from professional play at the age of 39. He won the Eredivisie title and KNVB Cup with Ajax, and the Eerste Divisie title with Haarlem.

He later worked as a coach, including as an assistant at HFC Haarlem, and as assistant manager, scout, and caretaker manager at AZ. He also managed amateur club AFC '34, winning promotion with the club.

Fransz died on 18 December 2021, at the age of 84.
