= 1920–21 Netherlands Football League Championship =

Netherl. Football Championship
- Season: 1920–1921
- Champions: NAC (1st title)

The Netherlands Football League Championship 1920–1921 was contested by 43 teams participating in four divisions. The national champion would be determined by a play-off featuring the winners of the eastern, northern, southern and western football division of the Netherlands. NAC won this year's championship by beating Be Quick 1887, AFC Ajax, and Go Ahead.

== New entrants ==
Eerste Klasse East:

- Promoted from 2nd Division: TSV Theole

Eerste Klasse North:

- Promoted from 2nd Division: GVV Groningen

Eerste Klasse South:

- Promoted from 2nd Division: BVV Den Bosch & SV DOSKO

Eerste Klasse West:

- Promoted from 2nd Division: De Spartaan

== Divisions ==
=== Eerste Klasse East ===
Pos	Team	Pld	W	D	L	GF	GA	GD	Pts	Qualification or relegation
1	Go Ahead	18	14	3	1	49	10	+39	31	Qualified for Championship play-off
2	SC Enschede	18	12	4	2	54	22	+32	28	
3	Quick Nijmegen	18	8	3	7	34	33	+1	19	
4	Vitesse Arnhem	18	8	2	8	38	34	+4	18	
5	HVV Hengelo	18	5	7	6	19	26	−7	17	
6	ZAC	18	6	4	8	30	28	+2	16	
7	Theole	18	7	1	10	22	38	−16	15	
8	Be Quick Zutphen	18	6	2	10	21	41	−20	14	
9	Koninklijke UD	18	5	2	11	21	31	−10	12	
10	HVV Tubantia	18	4	2	12	21	46	−25	10	Relegated to 2nd Division

Source: rsssf.com

=== Eerste Klasse North ===
Pos	Team	Pld	W	D	L	GF	GA	GD	Pts	Qualification or relegation
1	Be Quick 1887	18	16	2	0	88	19	+69	34	Qualified for Championship play-off
2	WVV Winschoten	18	11	5	2	47	24	+23	27	
3	Velocitas 1897	18	10	5	3	44	19	+25	25	
4	Achilles 1894	18	8	3	7	32	33	−1	19	
5	LAC Frisia 1883	18	6	5	7	20	25	−5	17	
6	GSAVV Forward	18	6	2	10	21	36	−15	14	
7	Veendam	18	4	5	9	21	42	−21	13	
8	MVV Alcides	18	5	2	11	31	49	−18	12	
9	GVV Groningen	18	3	4	11	14	48	−34	10	
10	HSC	18	4	1	13	23	46	−23	9	Relegated to 2nd Division

Source: rsssf.com

=== Eerste Klasse South ===
Pos	Team	Pld	W	D	L	GF	GA	GD	Pts	Qualification or relegation
1	NAC	20	17	3	0	64	8	+56	37	Qualified for Championship play-off
2	MVV Maastricht	20	14	2	4	50	23	+27	30	
3	NOAD	20	10	5	5	30	17	+13	25	
4	Willem II	20	10	2	8	37	30	+7	22	
5	Bredania	20	9	4	7	28	25	+3	22	
6	VVV Venlo	20	8	4	8	25	33	−8	20	
7	BVV Den Bosch	20	7	5	8	21	24	−3	19	
8	CVV Velocitas	20	7	2	11	29	39	−10	16	
9	SV DOSKO	20	4	7	9	20	40	−20	15	
10	RKVV Wilhelmina	20	6	2	12	35	43	−8	14	
11	Zeelandia Middelburg	20	0	0	20	8	65	−57	0	Relegated to 2nd Division

Source: rsssf.com

=== Eerste Klasse West ===
Pos	Team	Pld	W	D	L	GF	GA	GD	Pts	Qualification or relegation
1	AFC Ajax	22	18	1	3	50	20	+30	37	Qualified for Championship play-off
2	Blauw-Wit Amsterdam	22	14	3	5	40	20	+20	31	
3	HBS Craeyenhout	22	11	4	7	37	23	+14	26	
4	UVV Utrecht	22	11	4	7	38	35	+3	26	
5	De Spartaan	22	10	2	10	33	39	−6	22	
6	HFC Haarlem	22	10	1	11	39	31	+8	21	
7	HVV Den Haag	22	9	3	10	41	36	+5	21	
8	VOC	22	7	6	9	33	42	−9	20	
9	DFC	22	8	2	12	29	34	−5	18	
10	VVA Amsterdam	22	8	1	13	30	50	−20	17	
11	Sparta Rotterdam	22	6	3	13	23	36	−13	15	Relegated to 2nd Division
12	AFC	22	4	2	16	19	46	−27	10	Relegated to 2nd Division

Source: rsssf.com

=== Championship play-off ===
Pos	Team	Pld	W	D	L	GF	GA	GD	Pts	NAC	BEQ	AJA	GOA
1	NAC	6	4	0	2	13	8	+5	8		0–2	2–0	3–1
2	Be Quick 1887	6	3	1	2	11	11	0	7	4–3		1–0	1–1
3	AFC Ajax	6	3	0	3	14	9	+5	6	1–2	3–2		5–2
4	Go Ahead	6	1	1	4	8	18	−10	3	0–3	4–1	0–5	

Source: rsssf.com
