= Evert van Linge =

Dutch footballer

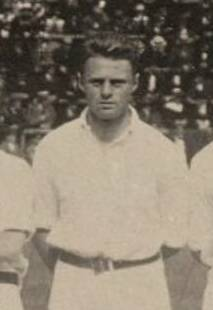

Personal information
- Date of birth: 19 November 1895
- Place of birth: Veendam, Netherlands
- Date of death: 6 December 1964 (aged 69)
- Place of death: Groningen, Netherlands

International career
Years	Team	Apps	(Gls)
1919–1926	Netherlands	13	(3)

Evert van Linge (19 November 1895 – 6 December 1964) was a Dutch footballer who earned 13 caps for the Dutch national side between 1919 and 1926, scoring three goals. He also participated at the 1924 Summer Olympics. He played for Be Quick 1887 and SC Veendam.

He was an architect and designed football club Be Quick 1887's Stadion Esserberg.
