= Wim Hanse =

Dutch footballer (1924–1967)

Personal information
- Full name: Willem Hansen
- Date of birth: 5 February 1924
- Place of birth: Haarlem, Netherlands
- Date of death: 19 October 1967 (aged 43)
- Place of death: Haarlem, Netherlands
- Position: Forward

Senior career*
Years	Team	Apps	(Gls)
1939-1949	RCH	168	(178)
- * Club domestic league appearances and goals

Wim Hansen (5 February 1924 – 19 October 1967), more commonly known as Wim Hanse, was a Dutch footballer who played as a forward for Racing Club Haarlem between 1939 and 1949.

== Career ==
At the age of 16, Wim Hanse made his debut for Racing Club Haarlem (R.C.H.) in the away match against Koninklijke HFC. As a result of four goals scored by the young Hanse, R.C.H. won the game with a score of 4–1. After a 5–0 win against BVV De Kennemers, Hanse joined the standard line-up as a striker.

In the 1941–42 season, R.C.H. won the league and played playoffs for promotion against De Volewijckers and VV DOS. The club did not manage to promote as a result of two losses. Another setback for Hanse's team was that, during the later phases of World War II, the German occupiers needed more and more young men for the war, so some of Hanse's teammates were sent to Germany or disappeared entirely during the 1943–44 season.

In the same season, the R.C.H. eleven needed to walk almost two hours to an away game at Oostzaan, because of sudden absence of transportation from Amsterdam. Despite this, they spectacularly won the match with 5–1. The subsequent season, 1944–45 was cancelled prematurely because of the Dutch famine.

During that same precarious period, Hanse was selected for the Netherlands national team, for which he played at least one game (0–3 against England in De Kuip).

After the liberation, R.C.H. had a few good seasons in the Tweede Klasse, with the 1948–49 season as the highlight. During the deciding match against RKVV Velsen, Hanse managed to score the winning goal, making R.C.H. champions of the league. This championship allowed them to compete in a promotion league. The first three promotion matches were won effortlessly, but because of the two subsequent losses, a win against D.H.C. on 1 May 1949 was essential. Hanse scored a whopping four goals during this match, and his assist on Koster resulted in the game ending in a 5–1 victory. After 12 years, Racing Club Haarlem finally managed to return to the Eerste Klasse, at the time the highest Dutch football league.

In the 1949/50 season, Wim Hanse only played in four games. A few days after the victory over SC 't Gooi, a disease was diagnosed that ended Hanse's football career. His position as a striker was taken over by Klaas de Boer. Hanse was missed severely at the club, as proven by the following (translated) words about him in the 1951 club magazine: "He was our striker for nine years and he has done countless times, what a striker is expected to do: making goals. He had an extraordinarily fierce sprint and could shoot on target at full speed, without having a preference for his left or right foot. His whole body seemed to be geared towards making goals, because he could just as easily score with his head as he did with his legs. For years he, along with great technical players like Biesbrouck and De Wette, formed an almost ideal trio. For a considerable amount, our promotion was his work and because of that, it's such a shame that he could only play a few matches in the Eerste Klasse."

During Hanse's time at R.C.H. he scored 178 goals in 168 matches, and was the team's top scorer in every year that he played for the club. Despite his short career, Hanse is an indispensable part of the history of R.C.H. and Haarlem's football history as a whole. In 1953, he was appointed as a member of merit by his old club.

== Personal life ==
Born to Willem Hansen and Mina Steffens, Wim Hanse died on 19 October 1967, at the age of 43. He left behind his wife Coby Munter and two daughters.

== Career statistics ==
Appearances and goals by club, season and competition
Season	Club	Competition	League		Playoffs		Total	
Season	Club	Competition	Apps	Goals	Apps	Goals	Apps	Goals
Racing Club Haarlem	1939–40	Tweede Klasse	1	0			1	0
Racing Club Haarlem	1940–41	Tweede Klasse	16	15			16	15
Racing Club Haarlem	1941–42	Tweede Klasse	22	23	4	0	26	23
Racing Club Haarlem	1942–43	Tweede Klasse	18	18			18	18
Racing Club Haarlem	1943–44	Tweede Klasse	20	24			20	24
Racing Club Haarlem	1944–45	Tweede Klasse						
Racing Club Haarlem	1945–46	Tweede Klasse	20	27			20	27
Racing Club Haarlem	1946–47	Tweede Klasse	20	22			20	22
Racing Club Haarlem	1947–48	Tweede Klasse	20	24			20	24
Racing Club Haarlem	1948–49	Tweede Klasse	17	18	6	7	23	25
Racing Club Haarlem	1949–50	Eerste Klasse	4	0			4	0
Career total			158	171	10	7	168	178
