= Toon Oprinsen =

Dutch footballer

Personal information
- Date of birth: 25 November 1910
- Place of birth: Tilburg, Netherlands
- Date of death: 14 January 1945 (aged 34)
- Place of death: Vught, Netherlands
- Position: Midfielder

Senior career*
Years	Team	Apps	(Gls)
- NOAD Tilburg

International career
1934	Netherlands	1	(0)
- * Club domestic league appearances and goals

Antonius Adrianus Henricus Oprinsen (25 November 1910 – 14 January 1945) was a Dutch football midfielder who played for Netherlands in the 1934 FIFA World Cup. He also played for NOAD Tilburg.
