= Frits Louer =

Dutch footballer (1931–2021)

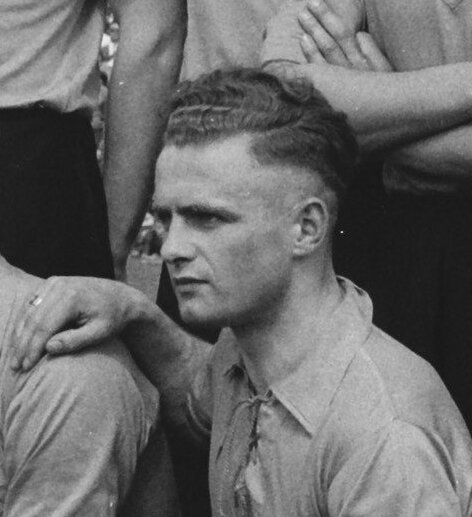
- Louer in 1954

Personal information
- Full name: Fredericus Joannes Louer
- Date of birth: 24 November 1931
- Place of birth: Tilburg, Netherlands
- Date of death: 29 November 2021 (aged 90)
- Place of death: Tilburg, Netherlands
- Position: Forward

Senior career*
Years	Team	Apps	(Gls)
1948–1961	NOAD		
1961–1964	Willem II		

International career
1952–1954	Netherlands	3	(1)
- * Club domestic league appearances and goals

Fredericus Joannes Louer (24 November 1931 – 29 November 2021) known as Frits Louer, was a Dutch footballer who played as a forward for NOAD and Willem II. He played in three matches and scored once for the Netherlands national team between 1952 and 1954. He represented his country at the men's tournament of the 1952 Summer Olympics.
