= Appie Groen =

Dutch footballer (1901–1964)

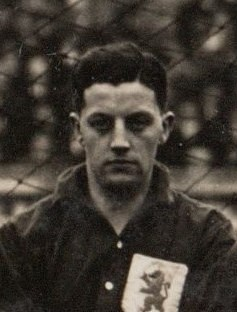
- Groen in 1926

Personal information
- Full name: Albert Geert Groen
- Date of birth: 7 September 1901
- Place of birth: Groningen, Netherlands
- Date of death: 29 February 1964 (aged 62)
- Place of death: Haren, Netherlands
- Position: Forward

Senior career*
Years	Team	Apps	(Gls)
1919-1927	Be Quick 1887		

International career
1922–1926	Netherlands	5	(1)
- * Club domestic league appearances and goals

Albert "Appie" Geert Groen (7 September 1901 – 29 February 1964) was a Dutch footballer who played as a forward. He made five appearances for the Netherlands national team from 1922 to 1926.

Groen joined hometown club Be Quick 1887 in 1919 and immediately won the 1919–20 Netherlands Football League Championship with the club.
