= Herman Legger =

Dutch footballer

Personal information
- Date of birth: 7 July 1895
- Place of birth: Veendam, Netherlands
- Date of death: 7 September 1978 (aged 83)

International career
Years	Team	Apps	(Gls)
1921-1922	Netherlands	2	(0)

Herman Legger (7 July 1895 – 7 September 1978) was a Dutch footballer. He played in two matches for the Netherlands national football team in 1921 and 1922.
