= Hans Tetzner =

Dutch footballer (1898–1987)

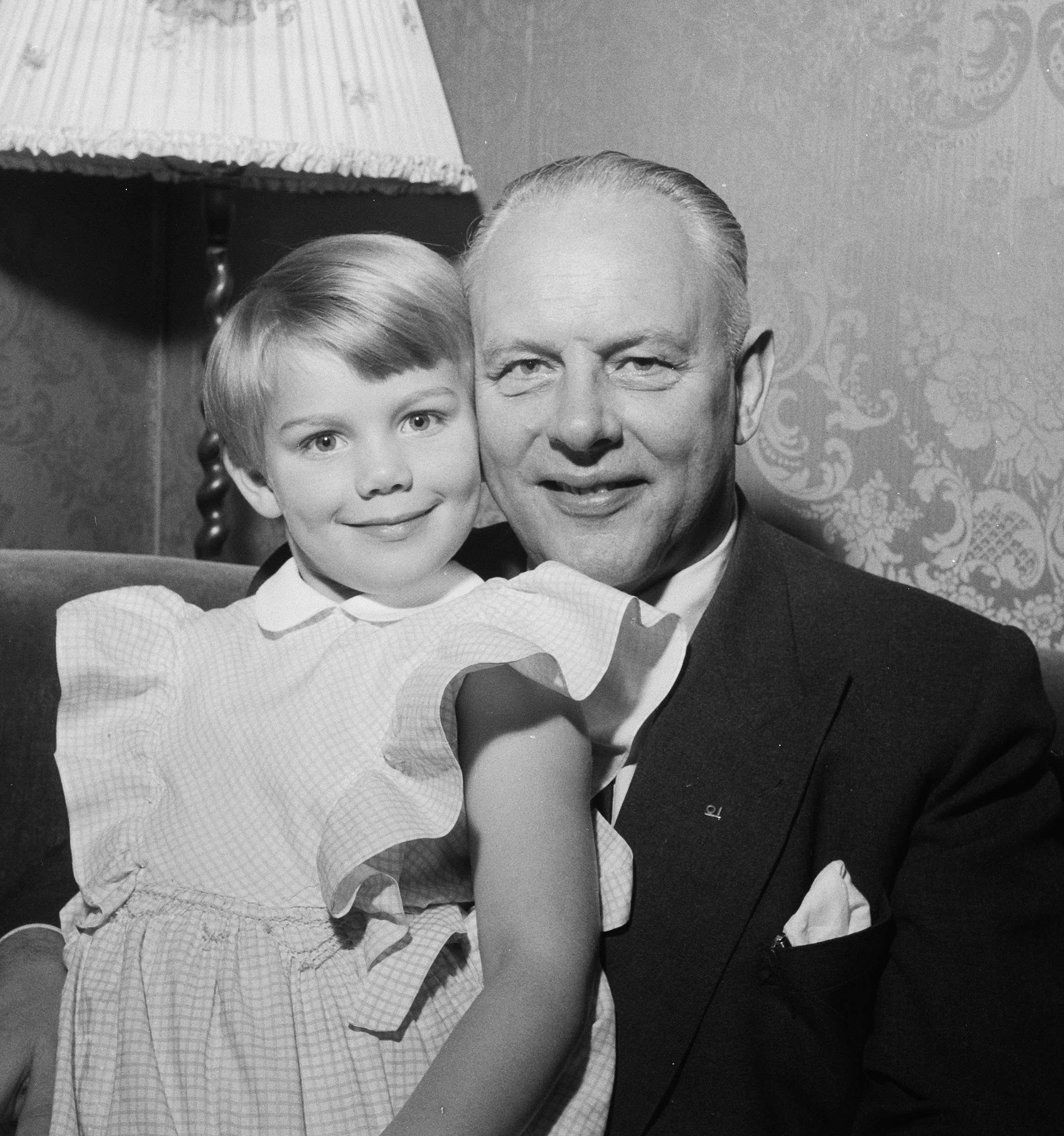
- Tetzner with his eldest daughter in 1955

Personal information
- Date of birth: 9 June 1898
- Place of birth: Groningen, the Netherlands
- Date of death: 17 February 1987 (aged 88)
- Place of death: Amsterdam, the Netherlands
- Position: Defender

Senior career*
Years	Team	Apps	(Gls)
1915–1926	Be Quick 1887		

International career
1923–1925	Netherlands	8	
- * Club domestic league appearances and goals

Johannes Cornelis "Hans" Tetzner (9 June 1898 – 17 February 1987) was a Dutch association football defender and medical doctor. He was part of the Dutch team that finished fourth at the 1924 Summer Olympics. Between 1915 and 1926 he played for Be Quick 1887, winning nine Northern Dutch titles and one national title in 1920.

Hans Tetzner had an elder brother Max; they competed alongside both in football and speed skating. Hans also played tennis, once reaching the semifinals of the Dutch national doubles championships. He later became a prominent surgeon and served as a doctor for the football club AFC Ajax and for the 1936 Dutch Olympic cycling team. In the 1960s he was a regular guest at the television show Wie van de Drie?
