= Max Tetzner =

Dutch footballer (1896–1932)

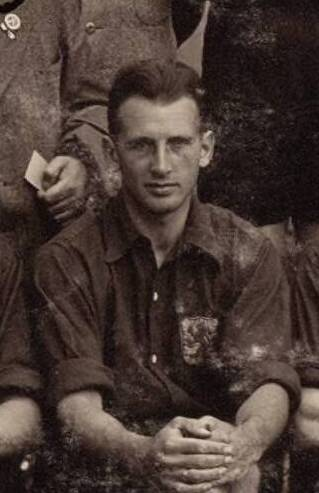
- Tetzner in 1921

Personal information
- Full name: Max Robert Dietrich Tetzner
- Date of birth: 25 September 1896
- Place of birth: Groningen, Netherlands
- Date of death: 7 November 1932 (aged 36)
- Position: Forward

Senior career*
Years	Team	Apps	(Gls)
- Be Quick 1887

International career
1921–1922	Netherlands	3	(0)
- * Club domestic league appearances and goals

Max Robert Dietrich Tetzner (25 September 1896 – 7 November 1932) was a Dutch footballer and speed skater. A forward, he played for Be Quick 1887 and in three matches for the Netherlands national team from 1921 to 1922. With Be Quick he won the Dutch national championship in 1920. His younger brother Hans was a member of the same team.

Max Tetzner was also successful as a speed skater. He became Dutch champion in 1919 and in 1922. In the last championship, held in his hometown of Groningen, he won all four distances.

He studied medicine and became a physician. He died of an infection at the age of 36.
