= 1922–23 Netherlands Football League Championship =

Netherl. Football Championship
- Season: 1922–1923
- Champions: RCH (1st title)

The Netherlands Football League Championship 1922–1923 was contested by 43 teams participating in four divisions. The national champion would be determined by a play-off featuring the winners of the eastern, northern, southern and western football division of the Netherlands. RCH won this year's championship by beating Be Quick 1887, Go Ahead, and Willem II.

== New entrants ==
Eerste Klasse East:

- Promoted from 2nd Division: Enschedese Boys

Eerste Klasse North:

- Promoted from 2nd Division: LVV Friesland

Eerste Klasse South:

- Promoted from 2nd Division: FC Eindhoven

Eerste Klasse West:

- Promoted from 2nd Division: HC & CV Quick & Sparta Rotterdam

== Divisions ==
=== Eerste Klasse East ===
Pos	Team	Pld	W	D	L	GF	GA	GD	Pts	Qualification or relegation
1	Go Ahead	18	15	3	0	55	9	+46	33	Qualified for Championship play-off
2	Heracles	18	9	6	3	33	23	+10	24	
3	SC Enschede	18	8	7	3	38	22	+16	23	
4	Quick Nijmegen	18	7	5	6	23	21	+2	19	
5	Enschedese Boys	18	8	2	8	28	29	−1	18	
6	HVV Hengelo	18	6	3	9	23	28	−5	15	
7	Koninklijke UD	18	6	3	9	31	39	−8	15	
8	ZAC	18	5	2	11	27	35	−8	12	
9	TSV Theole	18	5	3	10	20	39	−19	13	
10	Be Quick Zutphen	18	4	0	14	14	47	−33	8	Relegated to 2nd Division

Source: rsssf.com

=== Eerste Klasse North ===
Pos	Team	Pld	W	D	L	GF	GA	GD	Pts	Qualification or relegation
1	Be Quick 1887	18	13	3	2	73	22	+51	29	Qualified for Championship play-off
2	Velocitas 1897	18	13	0	5	42	19	+23	24 (Note: 2 points deducted.)	
3	Achilles 1894	18	9	5	4	39	22	+17	23	
4	WVV Winschoten	18	10	3	5	52	40	+12	23	
5	LAC Frisia 1883	18	7	4	7	33	30	+3	18	
6	Upright	18	6	3	9	18	43	−25	15	
7	LVV Friesland	18	6	4	8	26	31	−5	14	
8	Veendam	18	5	2	11	24	31	−7	12	
9	MVV Alcides	18	4	5	9	17	43	−26	11	
10	GSAVV Forward	18	2	1	15	12	55	−43	5	Relegated to 2nd Division

Source: rsssf.com

=== Eerste Klasse South ===
Pos	Team	Pld	W	D	L	GF	GA	GD	Pts	Qualification or relegation
1	Willem II	20	16	1	3	68	31	+37	33	Qualified for Championship play-off
2	NAC	20	14	1	5	53	31	+22	29	
3	FC Eindhoven	20	10	5	5	42	25	+17	25	
4	MVV Maastricht	20	11	3	6	38	27	+11	25	
5	RKVV Wilhelmina	20	10	2	8	33	35	−2	22	
6	BVV Den Bosch	20	9	3	8	48	34	+14	21	
7	NOAD	20	5	7	8	26	29	−3	17	
8	Bredania	20	6	4	10	27	27	0	16	
9	SV DOSKO	20	6	0	14	19	54	−35	12	
10	PSV Eindhoven	20	4	3	13	29	49	−20	11	
11	CVV Velocitas	20	4	1	15	24	65	−41	9	Relegated to 2nd Division

Source: rsssf.com

=== Eerste Klasse West ===
Pos	Team	Pld	W	D	L	GF	GA	GD	Pts	Qualification
1	RCH	22	9	11	2	38	21	+17	29	Qualified for Championship play-off Division West-I next season
2	Blauw-Wit Amsterdam	22	11	5	6	41	31	+10	27	Division West-II next season
3	Feijenoord	22	10	5	7	47	33	+14	25	Division West-I next season
4	HBS Craeyenhout	22	8	8	6	24	24	0	24	Division West-II next season
5	AFC Ajax	22	9	5	8	32	27	+5	23	Division West-I next season
6	VOC	22	9	4	9	41	36	+5	22	Division West-I next season
7	HFC Haarlem	22	9	3	10	43	45	−2	21	Division West-II next season
8	Sparta Rotterdam	22	8	4	10	28	34	−6	20	Division West-II next season
9	DFC	22	8	3	11	38	41	−3	19	Division West-I next season
10	HC & CV Quick	22	6	7	9	24	31	−7	19	Division West-II next season
11	HVV Den Haag	22	8	3	11	34	45	−11	19	Division West-I next season
12	UVV Utrecht	22	5	6	11	20	42	−22	16	Division West-II next season

Source: rsssf.com

=== Championship play-off ===
Pos	Team	Pld	W	D	L	GF	GA	GD	Pts	RCH	BEQ	GOA	WIL
1	RCH	6	4	0	2	16	11	+5	8		1–3	3–0	4–2
2	Be Quick 1887	6	2	1	3	9	8	+1	5	1–2		0–0	0–2
3	Go Ahead	6	2	1	3	4	8	−4	5	2–0	0–3		2–0
4	Willem II	6	3	0	3	12	14	−2	4 (Note: 2 points deducted.)	3–6	3–2	2–0	

Source: rsssf.com
