= Harry Rodermond =

Dutch footballer

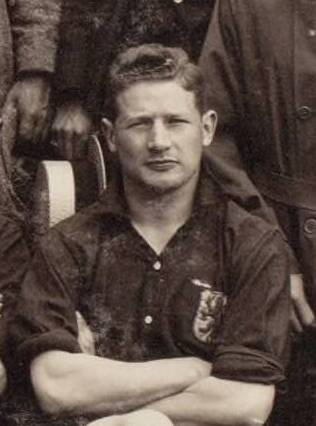
- Rodermond (1921)

Personal information
- Date of birth: 3 January 1897
- Date of death: 29 March 1983 (aged 86)

International career
Years	Team	Apps	(Gls)
1921–1922	Netherlands	5	(3)

Harry Rodermond (3 January 1897 – 29 March 1983) was a Dutch footballer. He played in five matches for the Netherlands national football team from 1921 to 1922.
