= Evert Jan Bulder =

Dutch footballer

Personal information
- Full name: Evert Jan Bulder
- Date of birth: 24 December 1894
- Place of birth: Groningen, Netherlands
- Date of death: 21 April 1973 (aged 78)
- Place of death: Heerenveen, Netherlands
- Position: Winger

Senior career*
Years	Team	Apps	(Gls)
1913–1932	Be Quick		

International career
1920	Netherlands	1	(0)
- * Club domestic league appearances and goals

Medal record

Men's Football

Representing Netherlands

Olympic Games
Bronze medal – third place	1920 Antwerp	Team competition

Evert Jan Bulder (24 December 1894 – 21 April 1973) was an association football player from the Netherlands, who represented his native country at the 1920 Summer Olympics in Antwerp, Belgium. There he won the bronze medal with the Netherlands national football team.

== Club career ==
Bulder played on the left wing for hometown club Be Quick, playing his final match against Leeuwarden on 11 October 1931. He won the Dutch league title with Be Quick in 1920.

== International career ==
He only earned one cap for the Netherlands, a September 1920 Olympic qualifier against Spain.

== Personal life ==
Bulder was born in Groningen. His younger brother Jaap (born 1896) was also a footballer and a member of the same Olympic squad. Bulder died, aged 78, in Heerenveen.
