= 1919–20 Netherlands Football League Championship =

Netherl. Football Championship
- Season: 1919–1920
- Champions: Be Quick 1887 (1st title)

The Netherlands Football League Championship 1919–1920 was contested by 41 teams participating in 4 divisions. The national champion would be determined by a play-off featuring the winners of the eastern, northern, southern and western football division of the Netherlands. Be Quick 1887 won this year's championship by beating VOC, Go Ahead and MVV Maastricht.

== New entrants ==
Eerste Klasse East:

- Promoted from 2nd Division: HVV Hengelo

Eerste Klasse South:

- Promoted from 2nd Division: 't Zesde (returning after five seasons of absence) & Bredania

Eerste Klasse West:

- Moving in from Division West-B: AFC

== Divisions ==
=== Eerste Klasse East ===
Pos	Team	Pld	W	D	L	GF	GA	GD	Pts	Qualification or relegation
1	Go Ahead	18	13	3	2	43	13	+30	29	Qualified for Championship play-off
2	HVV Tubantia	18	12	3	3	36	15	+21	27	
3	SC Enschede	18	8	5	5	27	29	−2	21	
4	ZAC	18	7	2	9	34	23	+11	16	
5	Quick Nijmegen	18	7	2	9	28	23	+5	16	
6	HVV Hengelo	18	6	4	8	21	29	−8	16	
7	Be Quick Zutphen	18	5	6	7	24	34	−10	16	
8	Vitesse Arnhem	18	5	4	9	28	36	−8	14	
9	Koninklijke UD	18	5	4	9	25	45	−20	14	
10	EFC PW 1885	18	4	3	11	16	35	−19	11	Relegated to 2nd Division

Source: rsssf.com

=== Eerste Klasse North ===
Pos	Team	Pld	W	D	L	GF	GA	GD	Pts	Qualification
1	Be Quick 1887	16	15	1	0	87	12	+75	31	Qualified for Championship play-off
2	Achilles 1894	16	8	2	6	35	33	+2	18	
3	WVV Winschoten	16	6	6	4	29	28	+1	18	
4	Velocitas 1897	16	7	2	7	42	39	+3	16	
5	Veendam	16	6	2	8	28	42	−14	14	
6	GSAVV Forward	16	5	3	8	31	40	−9	13	
7	MVV Alcides	16	5	2	9	22	41	−19	12	
8	HSC	16	5	2	9	23	46	−23	12	
9	LAC Frisia 1883	16	5	0	11	26	42	−16	10	

Source: rsssf.com

=== Eerste Klasse South ===
Pos	Team	Pld	W	D	L	GF	GA	GD	Pts	Qualification or relegation
1	MVV Maastricht	18	17	1	0	63	10	+53	35	Qualified for Championship play-off
2	NAC	18	14	0	4	45	14	+31	28	
3	Willem II	18	7	7	4	21	20	+1	21	
4	CVV Velocitas	18	7	3	8	31	33	−2	17	
5	NOAD	18	5	6	7	22	24	−2	16	
6	RKVV Wilhelmina	18	5	5	8	24	31	−7	15	
7	VVV Venlo	18	5	5	8	15	27	−12	15	
8	Bredania	18	5	5	8	14	26	−12	15	
9	Zeelandia Middelburg	18	5	4	9	30	44	−14	14	
10	't Zesde	18	2	0	16	10	46	−36	4	Relegated to 2nd Division

Source: rsssf.com

=== Eerste Klasse West ===
Pos	Team	Pld	W	D	L	GF	GA	GD	Pts	Qualification or relegation
1	VOC	22	12	6	4	33	21	+12	30	Qualified for Championship play-off
2	HBS Craeyenhout	22	12	5	5	45	26	+19	29	
3	HVV Den Haag	22	11	5	6	42	29	+13	27	
4	Blauw-Wit Amsterdam	22	10	4	8	33	22	+11	24	
5	AFC Ajax	22	8	7	7	34	31	+3	23	
6	UVV Utrecht	22	10	2	10	29	36	−7	22	
7	HFC Haarlem	22	8	5	9	35	31	+4	21	
8	Sparta Rotterdam	22	8	4	10	26	35	−9	20	
9	DFC	22	8	3	11	34	34	0	19	
10	AFC	22	8	2	12	25	35	−10	18	
11	HV & CV Quick	22	8	1	13	25	35	−10	17	
12	Koninklijke HFC	22	4	6	12	21	47	−26	14	Relegated to 2nd Division

Source: rsssf.com

=== Championship play-off ===
Pos	Team	Pld	W	D	L	GF	GA	GD	Pts	BEQ	VOC	GOA	MVV
1	Be Quick 1887	6	5	0	1	19	11	+8	10		4–0	2–1	7–3
2	VOC	6	3	1	2	16	10	+6	7	7–1		6–0	3–2
3	Go Ahead	6	2	1	3	10	14	−4	5	0–1	3–0		5–4
4	MVV Maastricht	6	0	2	4	10	20	−10	2	0–4	0–0	1–1	

Source: rsssf.com
