= Be Quick 1887 =

Association football club in Haren, Netherlands

- Full name: Be Quick 1887
- Nickname: Good-Old
- Founded: 10 April 1887; 138 years ago
- Ground: Stadion Esserberg, Haren
- Capacity: 12,000
- Chairman: Johan Vreeken
- Manager: Paul Matthijs
- League: Eerste Klasse
- 2023–24: Vierde Divisie D, 15th of 16
Home colours	Away colours

Be Quick 1887 is a football club based in Groningen, Netherlands. Currently members of the Vierde Divisie, the fifth tier of the Dutch football league system, the club was established in 1887, and the first team play their home matches at the 12,000-capacity Stadion Esserberg. The club's colours are yellow and red.

Be Quick won the 1919–20 Netherlands Football League Championship, becoming the first and only club from the Northern Netherlands to win the Dutch top-flight title.

== History ==
=== 19th century ===
Be Quick 1887 was founded on 4 October 1887 by students of a local gymnasium. The club joined the football competition in 1895, and was placed in the Tweede Klasse Noord, then the highest tier of football in the northern districts of the country.

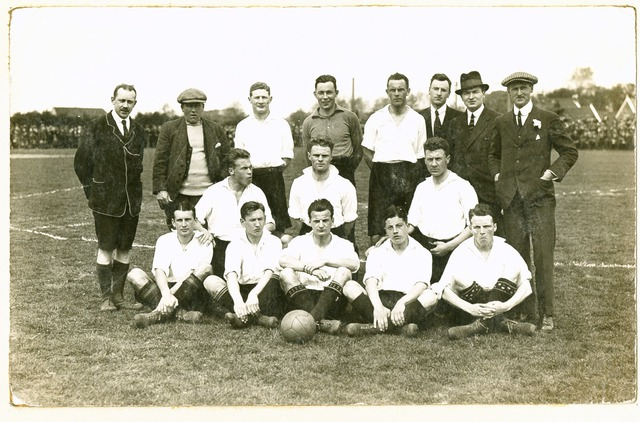
Be Quick team photographed in June 1920. Seated from left to right: Max Tetzner, Rieks de Haas, Jaap Bulder, Appie Groen, and Evert Jan Bulder. Kneeling from left to right: Siebold Sissingh, Evert van Linge and Herman Legger. Standing from left to right: J. (E.G.?) van Bisselick (referee), Harry Waites (trainer), Harry Rodermond, Deck de Ruiter Zijlker, Hans Tetzner, unknown, Jacob Koning (board member) and Bruins Oving (board member).

=== 20th century ===
Be Quick joined the newly established Eerste Klasse in 1916, and would remain in the league until the introduction of professional football in the Netherlands in 1954.

The heyday of Be Quick came between 1915 and 1926. The club won the title in the northern football competition in every season except for 1925. On 6 June 1920, Be Quick won the national football title, by defeating VOC of Rotterdam, champion of the western football league, 4–0. Of that team, goalkeeper Deck Ruijter Zylker was the only player who wouldn't make it to the Netherlands national football team.

When professional football was introduced in the Netherlands, in 1954, Be Quick joined the professional leagues. They were placed in the Tweede Divisie, where they won the 1959–60 title. Be Quick played in the Eerste Divisie for a number of seasons, but withdrew from the ranks of professional football after the 1963–64 season.

Upon returning to the amateur football structure, Be Quick were placed in the Tweede Klasse (now Eerste Klasse). The club were promoted to the Hoofdklasse in 1992, suffered relegation to the Eerste Klasse in 1995 and to the Tweede Klasse in 1997. After one season in the Tweede Klasse, the club returned to the Eerste Klasse, finishing the first season there in second place and winning the title in the second season, 1999–2000.

=== 21st century ===
The club was relegated back to the Eerste Klasse in 2002, but secured promotion a year later, and has played in the Hoofdklasse since. They were promoted to the Topklasse in 2013, but went relegated after one only season in the top Dutch amateur level. Two seasons later, they returned to the renamed Derde Divisie by placing second in Hoofdklasse C. In 2018, the club would get relegated from the Derde Divisie again, playing in the Zondag Hoofdklasse A until it got renamed to the Vierde Divisie in 2022. In 2024, the club would finish 15th in the Vierde Divisie D, meaning the club would be relegated to the Eerste Klasse, the 4th highest amateur level and the 6th level in the complete Dutch football pyramid.

== Stadium ==
The successes between 1915 and 1926 allowed the club to buy a piece of land to the south of the city of Groningen. Stadion Esserberg was then built, designed by architect Evert van Linge, one of the players of the team that won the national title in 1920. The stadium had a capacity of 18,000 when it was built, and now is located in the territory of the municipality of Haren, just a mere four kilometers south of Groningen. Nowadays, it has hosted to the Eurovoetbal tournament.

== Honours ==
Club honours
Honour	No.	Years
Netherlands Football League Championship	1	1919–20
Tweede Divisie	1	1959–60
Northern Football League Championship	18	1895–96, 1896–97, 1905–06, 1914–15, 1915–16, 1916–17, 1917–18, 1918–19, 1919–20, 1920–21, 1921–22, 1922–23, 1923–24, 1925–26, 1935–36, 1936–37, 1937–38, 1940–41
Eerste Klasse	2	1991–92, 1999–2000
