= Velocitas 1897 =

- Full name: Velocitas Groningen 1897
- Nickname: Velo (the Velo)
- Founded: 1 April 1897; 128 years ago
- Ground: Sportpark Stadspark, Groningen, Netherlands
- League: Eerste Klasse
colors

Velocitas 1897 is an association football club from Groningen, Netherlands. Founded in 1897, it won the 1933–34 KNVB Cup. Velo, as the club is nicknamed, played professional football from 1955 to 1960.

== History ==
=== 19th century: Foundation ===
Velocitas was founded on 1 April 1897.

=== 20th century: Rises and falls ===
In 1904 and 1905, Velocitas won section championships in the Derde Klasse. In 1905, it promoted to the Tweede Klasse and in 1916 to the Eerste Klasse.

==== 1920s–1950s: The golden years ====
From 1926 until 1935, with the exception of 1931–32, Velocitas won the regional Eerste Klasse championships every single season. In 1934, Velocitas won the KNVB Cup after beating Feyenoord 3–2 after extra time.

In 1952, after a long and impressive run in Eerste Klasse, Velocitas relegated to the Tweede Klasse. In 1954 and 1955, it won Tweede Klasse championships. In 1955 Veloictas promoted to the Eerste Klasse, exactly when it turned professional. Finishing 12th, the next season it continued to the professional second tier Tweede Divisie.

==== 1960s–1990s: Amateurs again; Women's football ====
In 1960, Velocitas relegated to Eerste Klasse that was back to amateur football since 1956. Velocitas immediately won two section championships yet would not return to play professional football. In 1974–75, Veolocitas played one year in the Hoofdklasse.

In 1982, a women's team was started that immediately won championships in the Derde Klasse and in the Tweede Klasse. This squad eventually made it to the national Hoofdklasse and Eredivisie. In 1994, a men's Saturday team was added, playing its first season in a regional derde klasse.

=== 21st century: The move to Saturday football ===
In 2001 the women's team and most of its players were sold to Oranje Nassau Groningen. In 2017 the Sunday team was discontinued.

In 2018 and 2019, the Saturday first squad won section championships in the Vijfde Klasse and Vierde Klasse, respectively. In 2022, the Saturday men's first squad won a Derde Klasse championship and promoted to the Tweede Klasse. In 2023, it won a Tweede Klasse championship and promoted to the Eerste Klasse.
