= TSV NOAD =

NOAD
- Full name: Tilburgse Sportvereniging Nooit Ophouden Altijd Doorspelen (Tilburgian Sports Association Never Stop Always Play)
- Founded: 1910
- Dissolved: 2017
- Ground: Sportpark TSV NOAD; Tilburg
- Capacity: 2,000
- 2016–17: Derde Klasse Sunday B, 14th
Home colours

TSV NOAD was an association football club based in Tilburg, Netherlands. Founded in 1910, the club played at the highest level of Dutch football between 1918 and 1961.

== History ==
NOAD was founded on 5 June 1910. Unlike most other clubs in North Brabant, the club was not formed as Roman Catholic but was rather secular. Initially, NOAD mainly played friendly matches against Roman Catholic institutes. Many so-called Roman Catholic clubs were not allowed by the clergy to play the "savages" of NOAD.

The first competitive league matches were played as Brabantian Football Association (BVB). In November 1917, the Royal Dutch Football Association (KNVB) placed NOAD in the National 2nd Klasse B. This meant, that the team regularly left the city and the province of Brabant to play at national level. NOAD immediately won the National 2nd Klasse B title. In order to reach promotion to the National 1st Division, two games had to be played against Bredania. In Breda, the score was 0–0. At home on Bosscheweg, Jan Panis scored the only goal – in front of more than 3,000 spectators – and secured the promotion to the 1st Division.

From 1918, the club played at the highest level, and from 1954 to 1971 as a professional club. In 1971, the municipality of Tilburg wanted a merger of the three professional teams of the town Willem II, NOAD and LONGA, but Willem II refused. The result was that NOAD and LONGA became non-league amateur clubs and Willem II continued as the only professional team of the city. Eventually in 2017, NOAD merged with LONGA and RKTVV to form FC Tilburg.

The exact meaning of the club name is unclear. TSV stands for Tilburgse Sportvereniging (Tilburgian Sports Association), and NOAD probably stands for "Nooit Ophouden Altijd Doorspelen" (Never Stop Always Play), which has been the most commonly used explanation. Another theory is that the name means is "Nooit Ophouden Altijd Doorgaan" (Never Stop Always Continue).

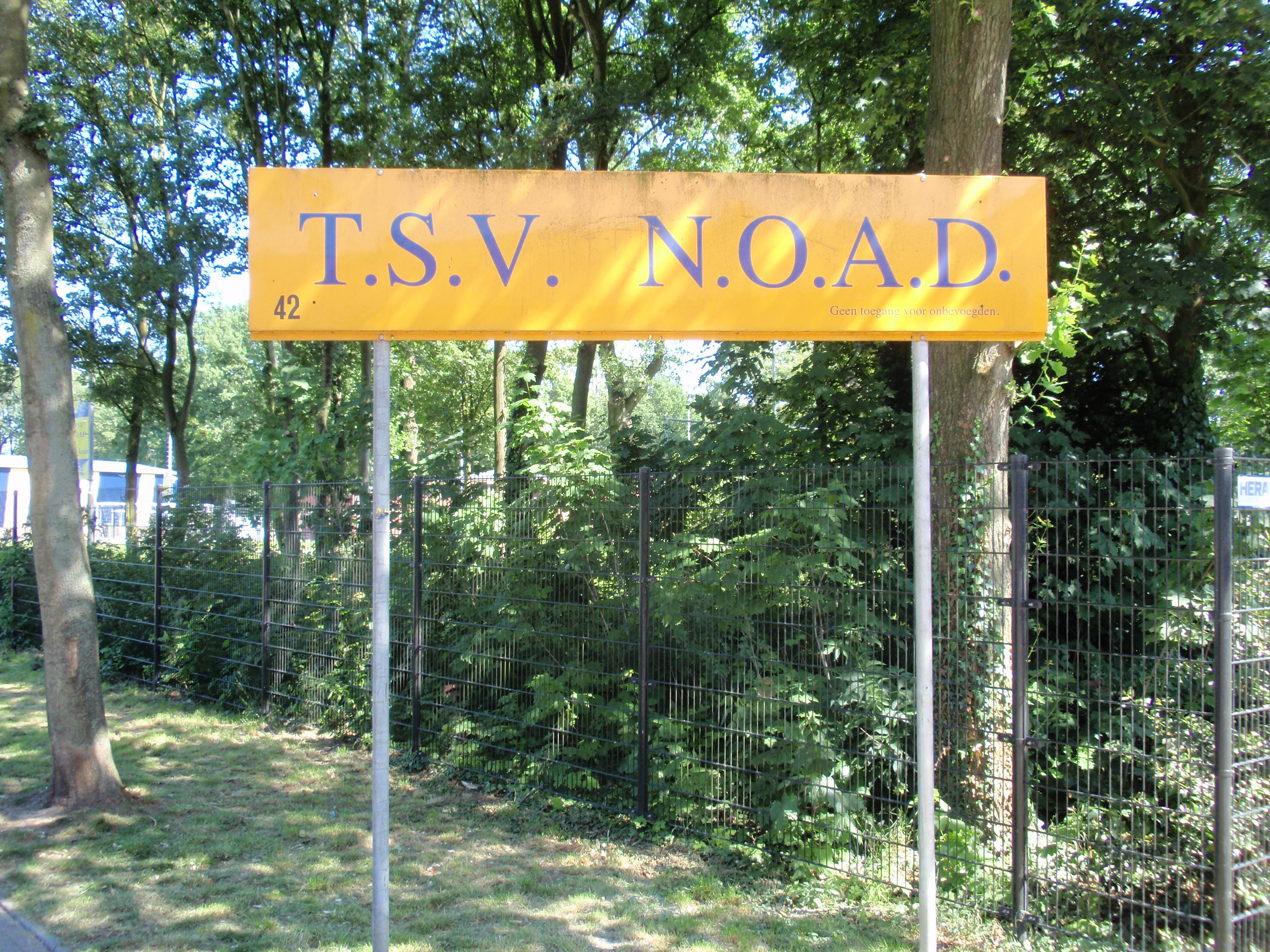
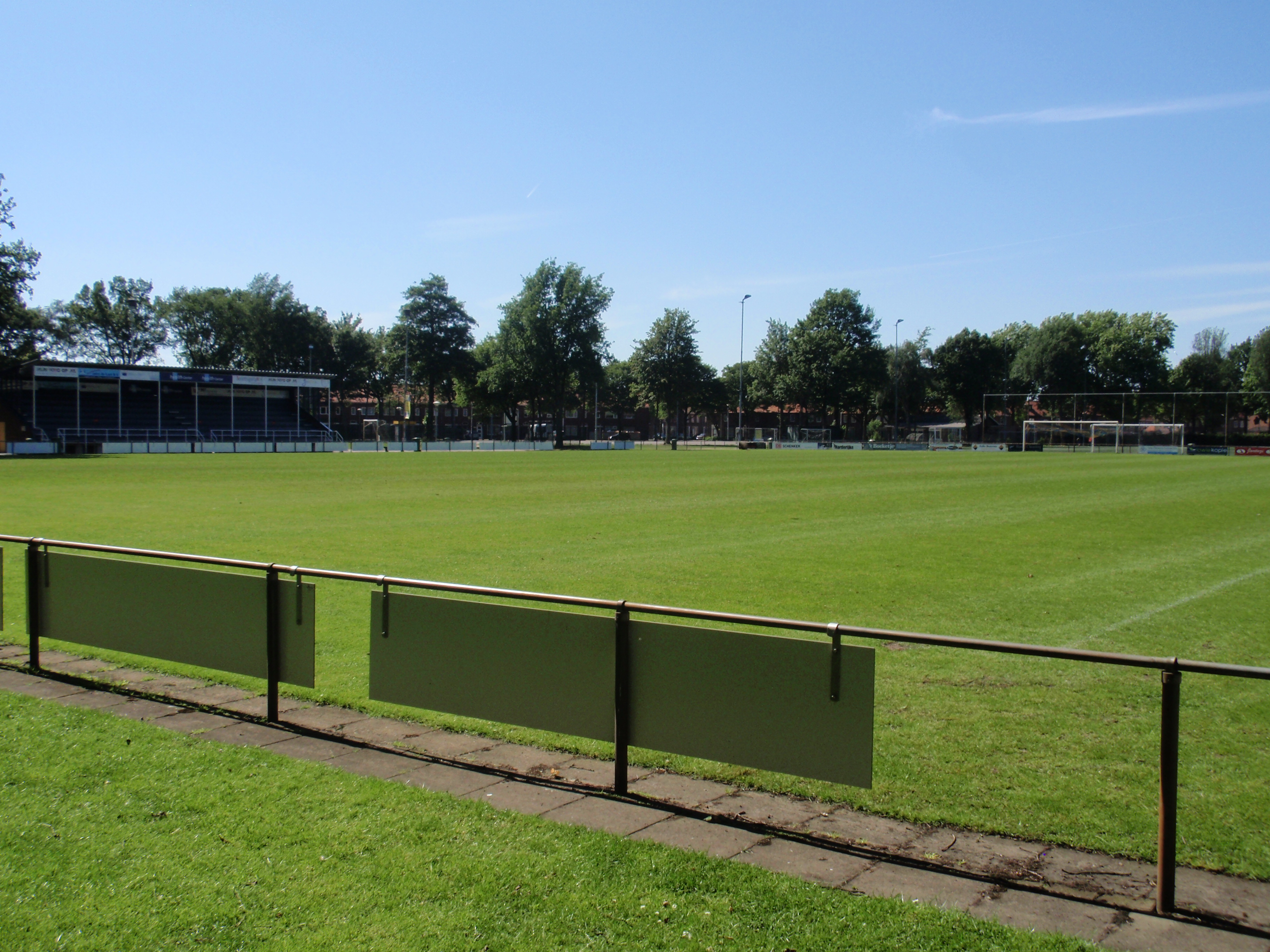
Logo at entrance (left) and stadium with main stand (right)

== Former players ==
=== National team players ===
The following players were called up to represent their national teams in international football and received caps during their tenure with NOAD:

- (Netherlands) Frits Louer (1948–1961)
- (Netherlands) Toon Oprinsen (1928–1936)
- (Netherlands) Henk van Tilburg (1918–1932)

- Years in brackets indicate careerspan with NOAD.

== Managerial history ==
Dates	Names
1930–1932	(England) Tim Coleman
1932–1933	(Austria) Richard Longin
1936–1938	(England) Bill Julian
1941	(Hungary) Vilmos Halpern
1945–1950	(Netherlands) Jan Bijl

Dates	Names
1950–1954	(Netherlands) Leen Vente
1954–1956	(Netherlands) Jan Bijl
1956–1958	(Netherlands) Kees van Dijke
1958–1961	(Netherlands) Jan de Bouter
1961–1964	(Netherlands) Maarten Vink

Dates	Names
1964–1965	(Netherlands) Kees van Dijke
1965–1968	(Netherlands) Maarten Vink
1968–1969	(Netherlands) Jan Rab
1969–1970	(Netherlands) Joop de Busser
1970–1971	(Netherlands) Hans Alleman
