= Racing Club Heemstede =

Dutch football club

RCH
- Full name: Racing Club Heemstede
- Founded: 25 February 1911
- Ground: Gemeentelijk Sportpark Heemstede
- League: Vierde Klasse
Home colours

Racing Club Heemstede (RCH) is an association football club from Heemstede, Netherlands. It was founded on 25 February 1911 and won the national title in 1923 and 1953. Until 1932 the club played in Haarlem and until 1965 the official name was Racing Club Haarlem.

== Honours ==
- Dutch National Football League

Winners
1922–23, 1952–53

- Dutch Football Cup

Winners
1917–18, 1927–28

== Associated people ==
=== Chief coach ===
- 1922–1924: Bill Julian
- 1946–1947: Bob Meacock
- 1947–1959: Les Talbot
- 1959–1961: Kick Smit
- 1961–1962: Thim van der Laan
- 1962–1965: Meg de Jongh
- 1965–1967: Tinus van der Pijl
- 1967–1967: Piet Dubbelman
- 1967–1970: Piet Peeman
- 1970: Les Talbot (interim)
- 1970–1971: Ben Tap

=== Top scorer ===
- 1936/37: Jacob v. d. Horst (10)
- 1937/38: Jacob v. d. Horst (11)
- 1938/39: Jacob v. d. Horst (16)
- 1939/40: Jacob v. d. Horst (8)
- 1940/41: Wim Hanse (15)
- 1941/42: Wim Hanse (23)
- 1942/43: Wim Hanse (18)
- 1943/44: Wim Hanse (24)
- 1945/46: Wim Hanse (27)
- 1946/47: Wim Hanse (22)
- 1947/48: Wim Hanse (24)
- 1955/56: Maup Kruijer (17)
- 1956/57: Lodewijk van Braam (17)
- 1957/58: Dries Mul (18)
- 1958/59: László Nánai (10)
- 1958/59: László Nánai (13)
- 1960/61: Bram Peper (13)
- 1961/62: Ab Koning (7)
- 1962/63: Arie van den Berg (18)
- 1963/64: Uli Maslo (13)
- 1964/65: Uli Maslo (14)
- 1965/66: Jan Fransz (10)
- 1966/67: Dick Meijer (12)
- 1967/68: Gerrie de Goede (12)
- 1968/69: Gerrie de Goede (11)
- 1969/70: Herman Kamoen (12)
- 1970/71: Piet van den Berg (13)
