= Paul Mulders =

Dutch-born Filipino footballer (born 1981)

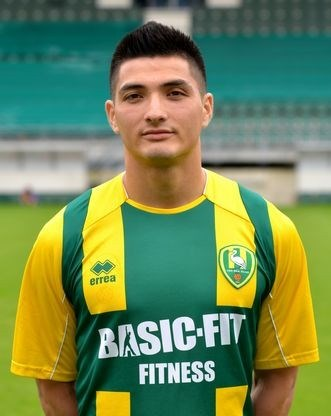
- Mulders with ADO Den Haag in 2012

Personal information
- Full name: Paul de la Cruz Mulders
- Date of birth: 16 January 1981 (age 45)
- Place of birth: Amsterdam, Netherlands
- Height: 1.82 m (5 ft 11 1/2 in)
- Position: Attacking midfielder

Youth career
- 1985–1989: A.V.V. Zeeburgia
- 1989–1997: Ajax
- 1997–2000: Haarlem

Senior career*
Years	Team	Apps	(Gls)
2000–2005	Haarlem	114	(20)
2005–2007	Cambuur	60	(5)
2007–2009	FC Omniworld	60	(11)
2009–2011	AGOVV Apeldoorn	58	(9)
2011–2013	ADO Den Haag	13	(5)
2013–2014	Global	3	(1)
2014	Cambuur	12	(5)
2014–2017	Ceres	5	(2)
2018	Global Cebu	10	(2)
2018–2019	Ceres–Negros	0	(0)

International career^{‡}
2011–2018	Philippines	44	(2)
Medal record
Men's football
Representing Philippines
AFC Challenge Cup
Silver medal – second place	2014 Maldives
Bronze medal – third place	2012 Nepal
- * Club domestic league appearances and goals as of 10:23, 7 May 2017 (UTC) ‡ National team caps and goals as of 15:42, 17 November 2018 (UTC)

Paul de la Cruz Mulders (born 16 January 1981) is a former professional footballer who plays as an attacking midfielder. Born in the Netherlands, he played for the Philippines national team.

He was last signed by Ceres–Negros in the Philippines Football League. Mulders is also a member of the Philippines national team. He had previously played for HFC Haarlem, FC Omniworld, AGOVV Apeldoorn, ADO Den Haag, Global Cebu and Cambuur. As of 2024 the National Football Teams Web site shows his last game for the Philippines as in 2018, and his last club game in 2019.

== Club career ==
=== Early years ===
Born in Amsterdam, Mulders is the youngest son of Dutchman Leo Mulders and Filipina mother Ofelia de la Cruz from Isabela, Ilagan. Mulders started youth football at A.V.V. Zeeburgia at age four until he was scouted by Ajax at age eight and trained at the Ajax Academy until he was 16.

=== HFC Haarlem ===
Mulders continued on to HFC Haarlem in 1997 where many former Ajax youth players have gone to continue their football pursuits. He made his professional debut in the Eerste Divisie at the age of 19 on 14 October 2000 against BV Veendam. Notably, on 6 August 2003, Mulders netted a goal against the opposition team consisting of Zlatan Ibrahimović and Wamberto during a friendly match against Ajax at the Amsterdam Arena. He won 114 appearances and scored 20 goals for Haarlem as a winger from 2000 to 2005 and impressed upon head trainer, Roy Wesseling.

=== Cambuur ===
As a free agent after the 2005 season, Wesseling brought Mulders and co-Haarlem teammate Rick Hooijboer with him to Cambuur. The then 24-year-old Mulders signed a two-year contract with the Frisian club. He would make sixty appearances for the Leeuwarders and score five goals as a forward. Cambuur, bogged by financial problems had failed expectations to climb the Jupiler League rankings in Mulders' second season with the club. As a result, he and six other players' contracts were not renewed.

=== FC Omniworld ===
Before the 2007–08 season got underway, Mulders had a brief failed pro-adventure in Austria during the summer break before finally signing with FC Omniworld in his backyard of Almere for two seasons. Poised to play his naturally preferred position as an attacking midfielder or as a shadow striker, he scored eleven goals in sixty appearances. In Omniworld, he met and clicked with assistant trainer Peter van Vossen who he would later meet again at AGOVV.

=== AGOVV Apeldoorn ===
On 3 February 2009, it was announced that Mulders had signed with AGOVV in Apeldoorn for two seasons and began his training in earnest in the summer of that same year with coaches John van den Brom and Peter van Vossen. It was while under the tutelage of Van den Brom that Mulders flourished with the team and in tandem played his best season yet in 2009–10 with the likes of teammates Nacer Chadli, Ramon Leeuwin, Chiró N'Toko, Jeremy Bokila, where AGOVV reached the promotion play-offs. In late April 2011, it was announced that he signed a two-year deal with an option for another year with ADO Den Haag.

=== ADO Den Haag ===
It was widely reported in August 2010, that Mulders' former coach at AGOVV Apeldoorn, John van den Brom, wanted to bring him to his new club ADO Den Haag, but talks for a transfer fell through. During the end of the winter transfer window, in January 2011 Zwolle was reportedly pursuing Mulders for a last minute mid-season transfer. In late April 2011, it was announced that he signed a two-year deal with an option for another year with ADO Den Haag.

Mulders made his UEFA Europa League debut for Den Haag on 4 August 2011, appearing as a substitute for Ahmed Ammi in the 32nd minute against Cypriot club Omonia in the third qualifying round. Den Haag won 1–0 but lost 3–1 on aggregate.

After 11 seasons in the Eerste Divisie, Mulders made his debut in the Eredivisie on 7 August 2011 against Vitesse.

=== Chiangrai United ===
In January 2013, it has been reported that Mulders had received an offer from Chiangrai United in the Thai Premier League, but both parties did not reach a final agreement before the winter transfer window closed.

Prior to the end of Mulders' contract with ADO Den Haag, and with the support of former teammate Adnan Barakat from Cambuur, Mulders travelled to Thailand in July 2013 to play a test match for Chiangrai United. Chiangrai's new head coach, however, did not extend him an offer to join the team.

=== Global FC ===
As a free agent, in July 2013 Mulders lent his services to Global FC ahead their campaign for the Singapore Cup.

=== Cambuur ===
On 20 January 2014, Mulders signed an amateur deal with Dutch Eredivisie side Cambuur until the end of the 2013–14 season.

=== Ceres Negros and Global Cebu ===
Mulders moved to Ceres Negros, then playing as Ceres in the United Football League, in 2014 after his second Cambuur stint. He later had a second stint with Global (now Global Cebu) and played for them for the first half of the 2018 Philippines Football League season before returning to Ceres in July 2018.

== International career ==
Shortly after the announcement of Mulders' transfer to ADO Den Haag, his friends and a cousin set up a Facebook fanpage for him. The page was then forwarded to the Philippine Football Federation and within a week he was invited to come to Manila to join the national team. Mulders cited that based on his football resume, video compilations and the fact that he had signed with ADO that he made the selection.

In early June 2011, he arrived in Manila and obtained his Philippine passport. He was named into the final squad for their 2014 FIFA World Cup qualification first round match against Sri Lanka. On 29 June 2011, Mulders made his debut for the Philippines in Colombo, as they drew 1–1 with Sri Lanka. Philippines wins the return match in Manila at 4–0 and advances to the second round qualifiers against Kuwait . He would miss the Kuwait matches due to a leg wound infection incurred from a sliding tackle in Colombo.

On 7 October 2011, Mulders would again reprise his role in a friendly match against Singapore with a 2–0 loss for the Philippines. Following a friendly match against Nepal on 11 October 2011, the Philippines won 4–0 where Mulders played an instrumental role providing an assist to Phil Younghusband's goal in the 17th minute.

=== Retirement ===
On 16 March 2016, Azkals team manager Dan Palami confirmed that Mulders has retired from playing at international level. He has since returned to play again for the Azkals.

=== International goals ===
Scores and results list the Philippines' goal tally first.

#	Date	Venue	Opponent	Score	Result	Competition
2012
1.	24 November 2012	Rajamangala Stadium, Bangkok, Thailand	Thailand	1–2	1–2	2012 AFF Suzuki Cup
2014
2.	28 November 2014	Mỹ Đình National Stadium, Hanoi, Vietnam	Vietnam	1–3	1–3	2014 AFF Suzuki Cup

== Honours ==
=== International ===
Philippines

- AFC Challenge Cup runner-up: 2014; third place: 2012

== See also ==
- List of Philippines international footballers born outside the Philippines
