= Rick Hooijboer =

Dutch footballer (born 1974)

Personal information
- Date of birth: 3 August 1974 (age 52)
- Place of birth: Venhuizen, Netherlands
- Position: Defender

Youth career
- De Valken
- Volendam

Senior career*
| Years | Team | Apps | (Gls) |
| 1997–1998 | Hollandia | | |
| 1998–2000 | AZ | 0 | (0) |
| 2000–2005 | Haarlem | 144 | (8) |
| 2005–2008 | Cambuur | 85 | (3) |
| Total | | 229 | (11) |
- * Club domestic league appearances and goals

Rick Hooijboer (born 3 August 1974 in Venhuizen) is a Dutch retired footballer who played as a defender.

== Career ==
=== Amateur career: until 1998 ===
Hooijboer started out playing for local team De Valken. He was discovered by FC Volendam and played there for several years. He returned to his former home town club and before moving to Hollandia in Hoorn two years later. He did very well for the Hoofdklasse club. AZ noticed the 23-year-old West Frisian who at that point became a full pro. He was the first player AZ Alkmaar recruited for Eredivisie season 1998–99. Even though the AZ staff appeared to want him badly, the defender/midfielder was not given a chance to show his skills.

=== HFC Haarlem: 2000–2005 ===
He skippered Eerste Divisie outfit Haarlem and objected against filmin a reality soap about the club in 2005.

=== Cambuur Leeuwarden: 2005–present ===
Hooijboer left his club HFC Haarlem together with team mate Paul Mulders in 2005. Both men left Haarlem on a free transfer for Cambuur Leeuwarden. The 30-year-old centre back and captain wanted a new challenge after a five year stay in Haarlem. Former Haarlem manager Roy Wesseling (manager of Cambuur at the time) persuaded him to join his new club. He broke his ankle in a March 2008 match against Volendam and that proved to be his final match.

== Post-playing career ==
After retiring as a player, Hooijboer became a plasterer.

Hooijboer was named assistant head coach at former club Hollandia in 2015.

== Statistics ==
| Seizoen | Club | Wedstrijden | Doelpunten | Competitie |
|---|---|---|---|---|
| 1998/99 | AZ | 0 | 0 | Eredivisie |
| 1999/00 | AZ | 0 | 0 | Eredivisie |
| 2000/01 | HFC Haarlem | 16 | 0 | Eerste Divisie |
| 2001/02 | HFC Haarlem | 32 | 2 | Eerste Divisie |
| 2002/03 | HFC Haarlem | 32 | 2 | Eerste Divisie |
| 2003/04 | HFC Haarlem | 29 | 3 | Eerste Divisie |
| 2004/05 | HFC Haarlem | 35 | 1 | Eerste Divisie |
| 2005/06 | Cambuur Leeuwarden | 24 | 1 | Eerste Divisie |
| 2006/07 | Cambuur Leeuwarden | 33 | 1 | Eerste Divisie |
| 2007/08 | Cambuur Leeuwarden | 15 | 2 | Eerste Divisie |
| Totaal | | 216 | 12 | |
Updated December 12, 2007 Reference:
