= Mohamed Hamdaoui =

Dutch footballer (born 1993)

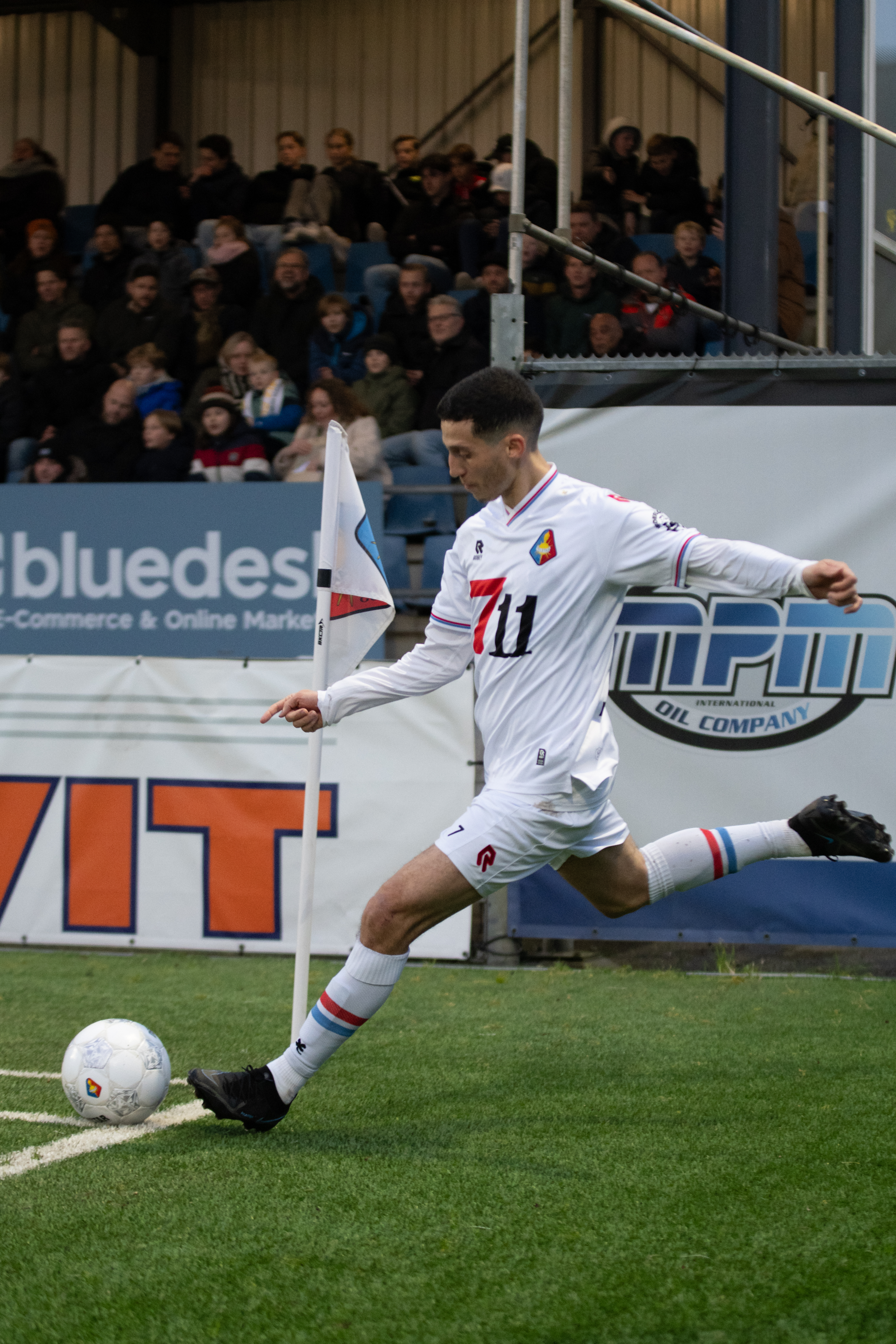
- Hamdaoui with Telstar in 2025

Personal information
- Date of birth: 10 June 1993 (age 33)
- Place of birth: Amsterdam, Netherlands
- Height: 1.70 m (5 ft 7 in)
- Position: Winger

Team information
- Current team: Al-Riffa

Youth career
- Kennemerland
- Haarlem
- Ajax
- 2011–2014: Vitesse

Senior career*
Years	Team	Apps	(Gls)
2014–2015	Vitesse	0	(0)
2014	→ Dordrecht (loan)	3	(0)
2015–2017	Go Ahead Eagles	3	(1)
2017–2018	Telstar	35	(11)
2018–2021	De Graafschap	44	(14)
2019	→ Twente (loan)	11	(1)
2021–2023	Zira	57	(4)
2023–2024	ADO Den Haag	12	(0)
2024–2026	Telstar	34	(3)
2026–	Al-Riffa	1	(1)
- * Club domestic league appearances and goals as of 09:47, 20 March 2026 (UTC)

Mohamed Hamdaoui (born 10 June 1993) is a Dutch professional footballer who plays as a left winger for Bahraini Premier League club Al-Riffa.

== Club career ==
Hamdaoui was born in Amsterdam. After playing for HFC Kennemerland, HFC Haarlem, AFC Ajax and Vitesse's youth setups, he graduated with the latter in 2014, and was loaned to Eredivisie side FC Dordrecht on 29 May 2014, along with fellow Vitesse teammate Robin Gosens.

Hamdaoui made his professional debut on 20 September 2014, coming on as a late substitute for Mart Lieder in a 1–1 away draw against SBV Excelsior. In January 2015 he returned to Vitesse, after appearing in three league matches for Dordrecht.

On 15 June 2015, Hamdaoui signed a two-year deal with Go Ahead Eagles.

On 28 January 2019, Hamdaoui joined FC Twente on a half-year loan deal from De Graafschap.

Hamdaoui signed a two-year contract with Azerbaijan Premier League club Zira on 16 July 2021.

On 30 August 2023, Hamdaoui moved to ADO Den Haag on a one-season contract.

On 2 September 2024, Hamdaoui signed an amateur contract with Telstar of the Eerste Divisie, returning to the club where he had previously played from 2017 to 2018. He left the club by mutual consent on 3 February 2026.

== Personal life ==
Hamdaoui was born in the Netherlands to parents of Moroccan descent.
