= Piet Groeneveld =

Dutch footballer

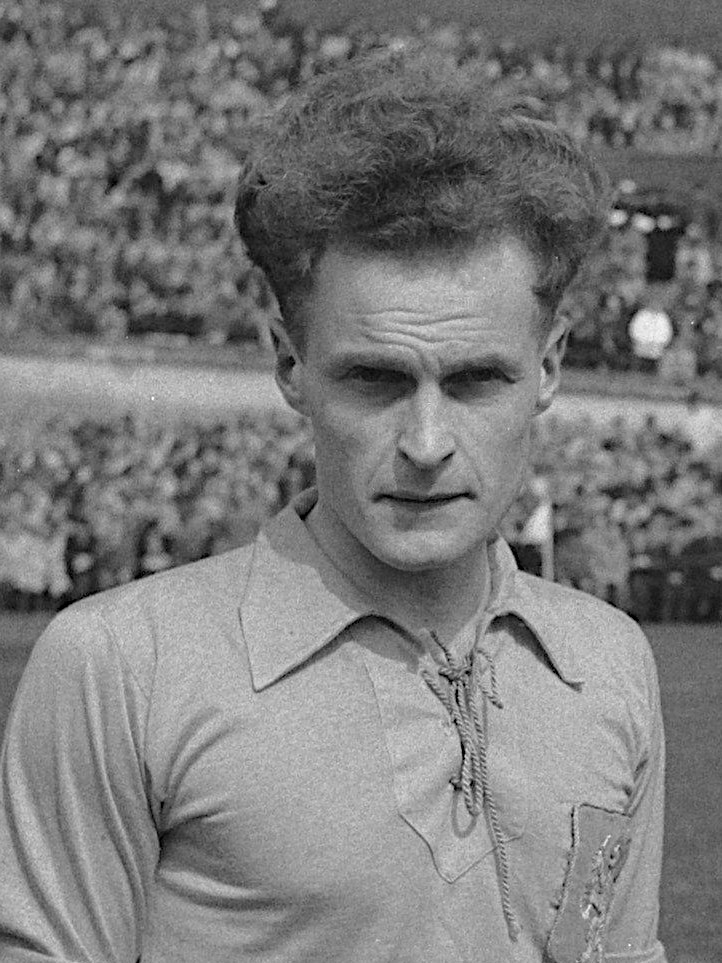
- Groeneveld in 1951

Personal information
- Full name: Johannes Pieter Groeneveld
- Date of birth: 18 August 1924
- Place of birth: Beverwijk, Netherlands
- Date of death: 9 November 1990 (aged 66)
- Place of death: The Hague, Netherlands
- Position: Left winger

Senior career*
Years	Team	Apps	(Gls)
1943–1960	Haarlem	408	

International career
1951	Netherlands	3	(0)
- * Club domestic league appearances and goals

Piet Groeneveld (18 August 1924 – 9 November 1990) was a Dutch footballer. He played in three matches for the Netherlands national football team in 1951.

Groeneveld played for Haarlem and formed a prolific partnership with Haarlem legend Kick Smit after World War II. He was part of their only title-winning team in 1946.
