= Venhuizen =

- Village
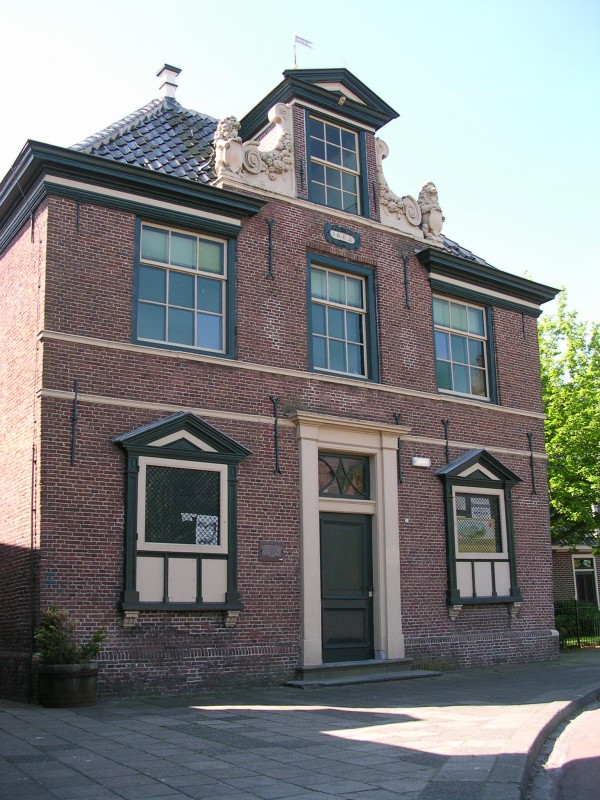
- The former town hall from 1662

- Flag Coat of arms

- Location in the Netherlands Location in the province of North Holland in the Netherlands
- Coordinates: 52°39′47″N 5°12′39″E
- Country: Netherlands
- Province: North Holland
- Municipality: Drechterland

Area
  - Village: 8.50 km^{2} (3.28 sq mi)
- Elevation: −1.0 m (−3.3 ft)

Population (2025)
  - Village: 4,285
  - Density: 504/km^{2} (1,310/sq mi)
  - Urban: 2,870
  - Rural: 1,415
- Time zone: UTC+1 (CET)
  - Summer (DST): UTC+2 (CEST)
- Postal code: 1606
- Dialing code: 0228

Venhuizen (Dutch: [vɛnˈɦœyzə(n)]; West Frisian: Fenhúze) is a town in the north-western Netherlands, in the province of North Holland and the region of West-Frisia, in the municipality of Drechterland. Venhuizen was a separate municipality until 1 January 2006, when it was merged with the existing municipality of Drechterland. It was decided to call the new municipality Drechterland.

On a map of the Hollands Noorderkwartier from 1288 is Venhuizen mentioned as Veenhusen. The name could refer to houses at or in the fen. The Dutch Reformed church dates from the 15th century. The other large church is the Roman Catholic St. Lucaskerk (St. Lucas church), built in 1956. It's also locally called the tough (robust) church (nl: stoere).

== Culture ==
The village fest occurs every year with Pentecost and includes a fun fair, a horse race, a volleyball tournament and several festivals. Each spring since 2017, a Food Festival Venhuizen has been held, attracting more than 10,000 visitors annually.

== Notable people ==
- Hendrik Offerhaus (1875–1953), rower
- Rob Compas (born 1966), road bicycle racer
- Rick Hooijboer (born 1974), football player
- Mathieu Boots (born 1976), soccer player
- Peter Koning (born 1990), racing cyclist

== Gallery ==
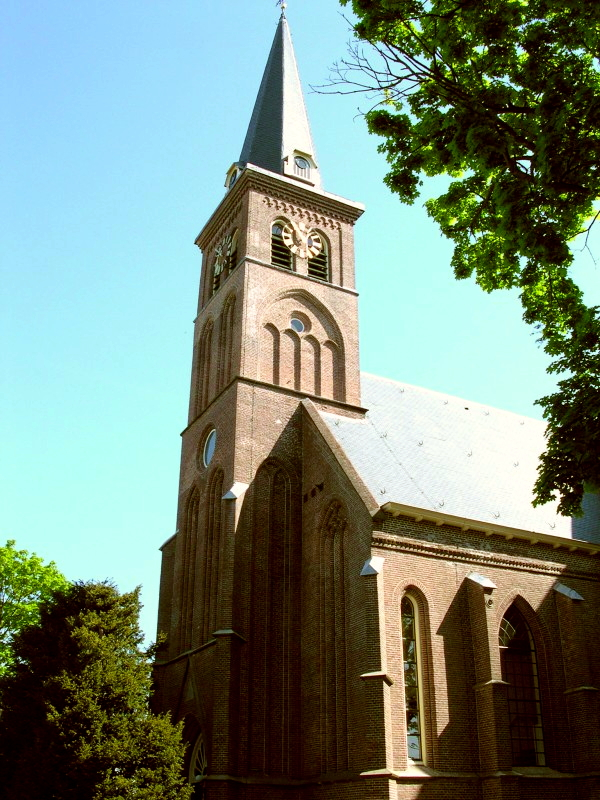
Dutch Reformed Church in Venhuizen

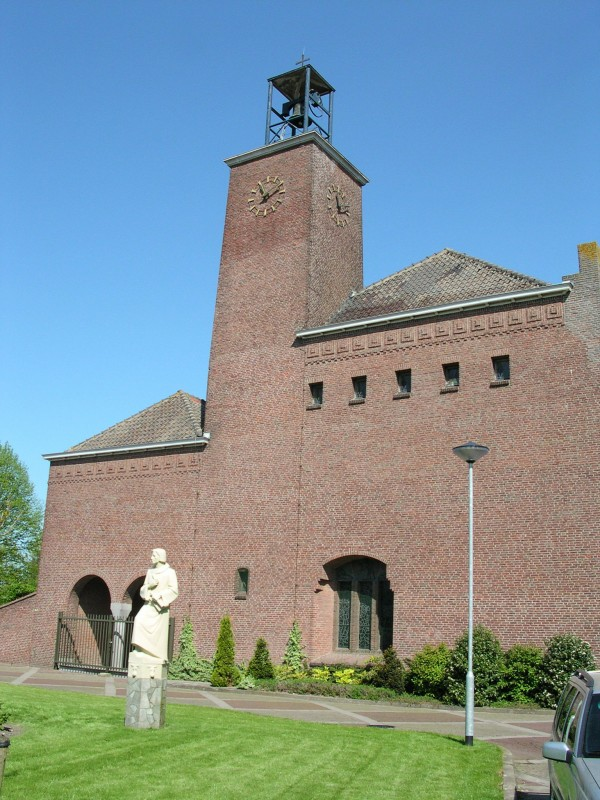
St. Lucaskerk.

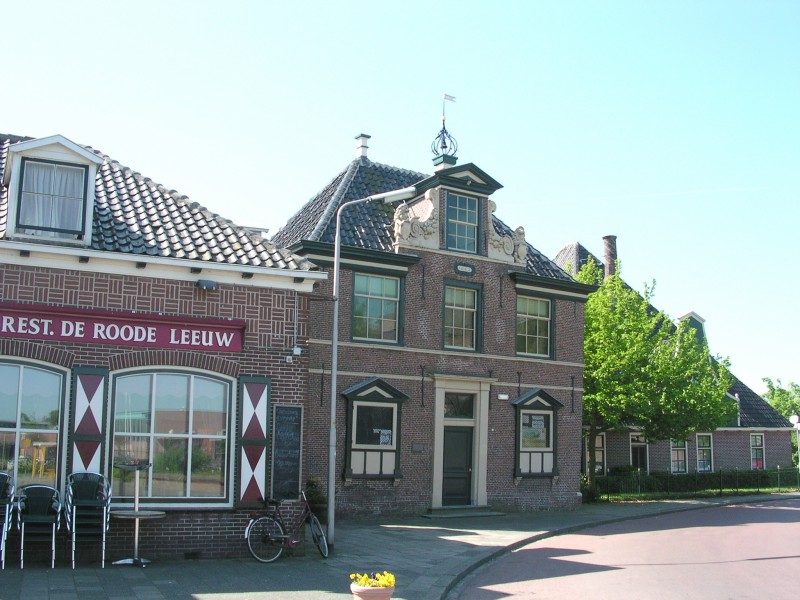
Restaurant next to the former town hall from 1662

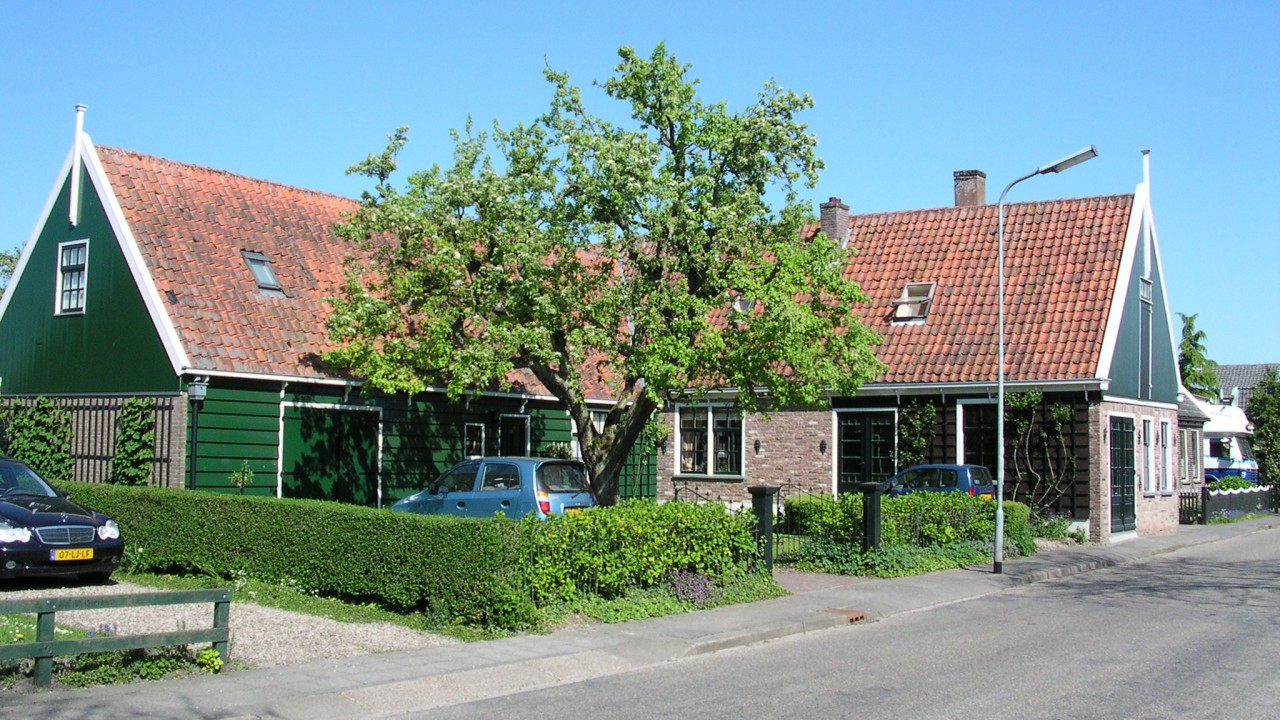
A typical house at Venhuizen

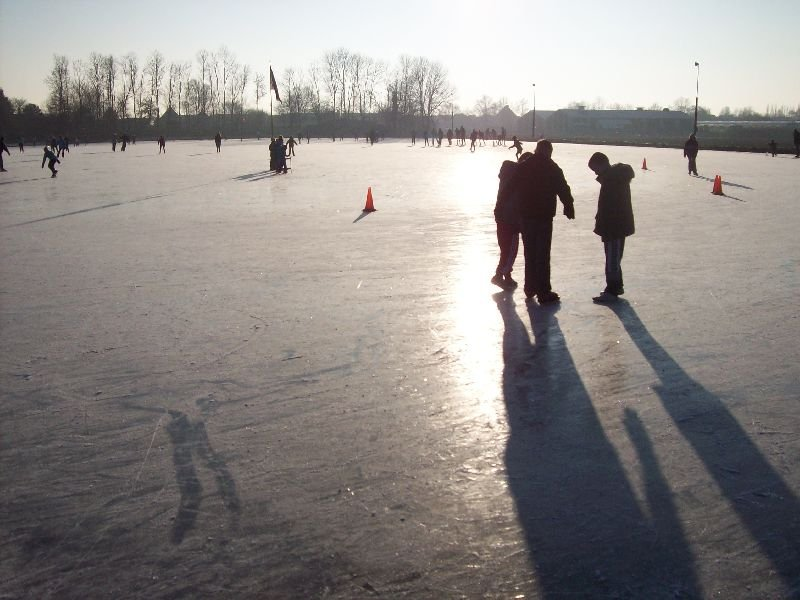
The Teun Sluis-iceskating rink at Venhuizen

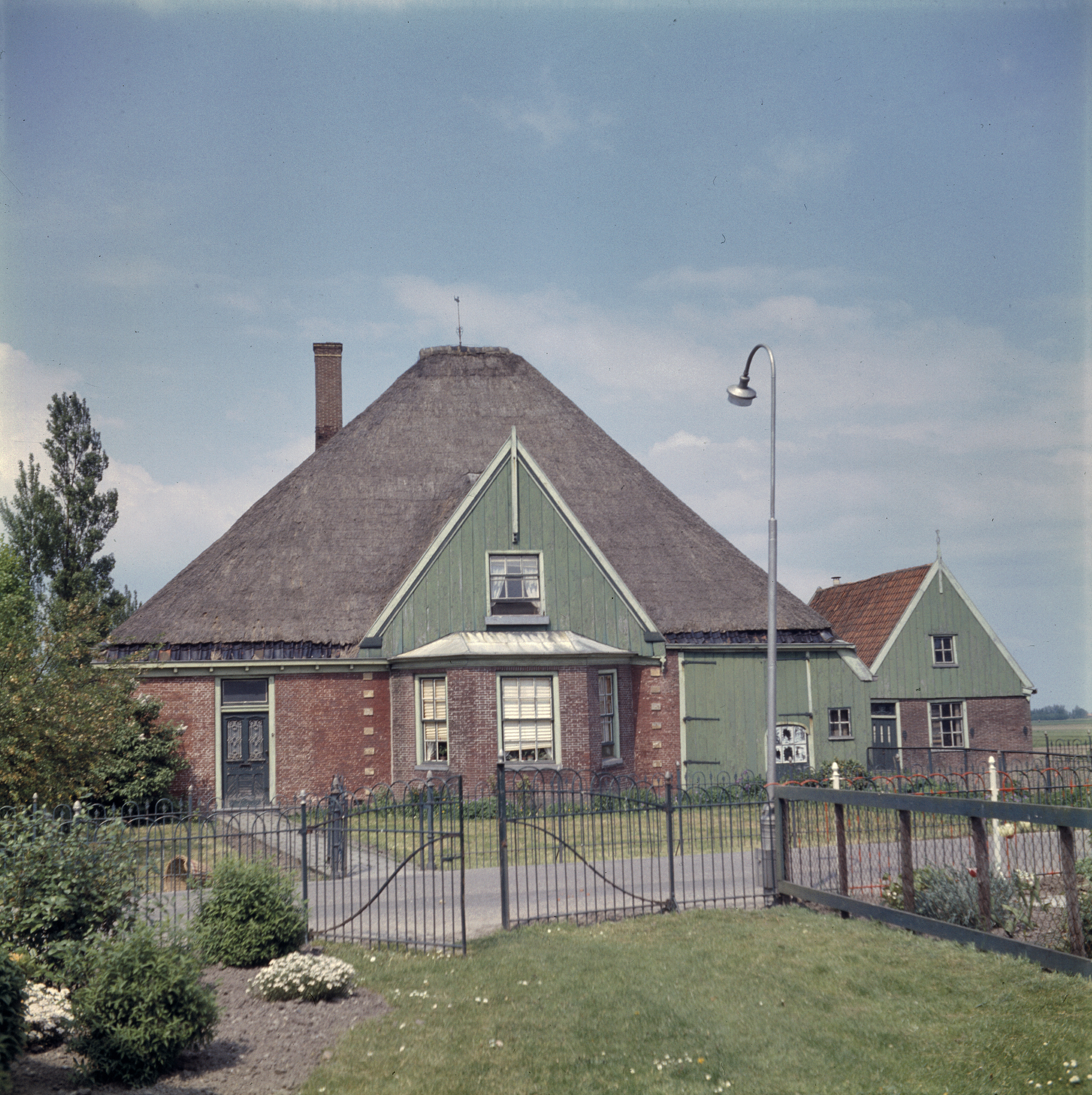
