= Haarlem Stadion =

Stadium in Haarlem, Netherlands

Coordinates: 52°24′37″N 4°38′56″E

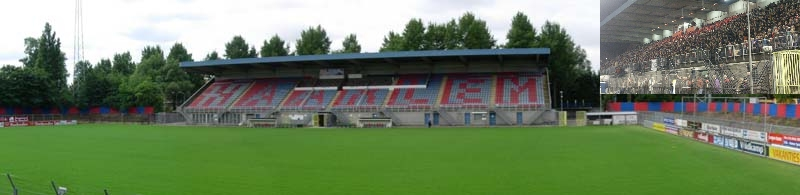
- South-side stands

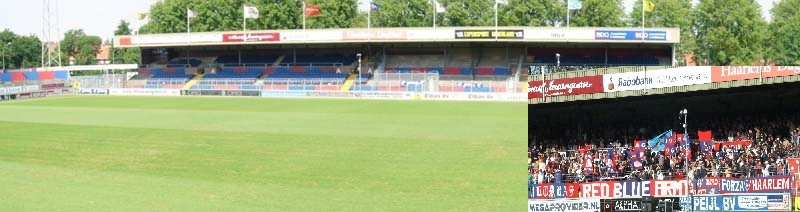
- North-side stands
- Interactive map of Haarlem Stadion
- Location: Haarlem, Netherlands
- Capacity: 3,442
- Surface: grass

Construction
- Built: 1907
- Renovated: 1947, 1986

Tenants
- HFC Haarlem (Eerste Divisie) 1948–2010; Haarlem Kennemerland (Vierde Klasse) 2010–

Haarlem Stadion (Dutch pronunciation: [ˈɦaːrlɛm ˌstaːdijɔn]) is a stadium in Haarlem, Netherlands, and the home stadium of the Dutch amateur football club Haarlem Kennemerland. Formerly home of the defunct professional football club HFC Haarlem, the stadium is located in the north of Haarlem. It was built in 1907, with renovations in 1947 and during the eighties, including the replacement of the south stand, which is an all-seater stand.

Today, the stadium consists of a vacant all-seater stands on the south. The north stand was demolished in 2016 after asbestos was found in the roof. The remaining stand is not used because it does not meet modern safety standards. The total capacity is 3,442 with 600 seats allocated to the visiting team.
