= Kees Kuijs =

Dutch footballer (1931–2026)

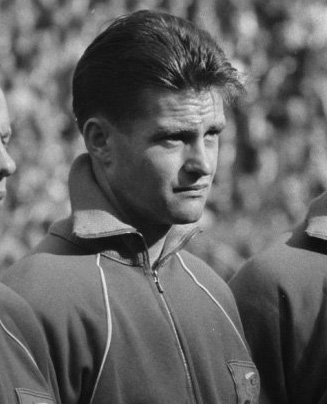
- Kuijs in 1960

Personal information
- Full name: Cornelis Johannes Kuijs
- Date of birth: 4 October 1931
- Place of birth: Anna Paulowna, Netherlands
- Date of death: March 2026 (aged 94)
- Position: Left-back

Senior career*
Years	Team	Apps	(Gls)
- BKC Anna Paulowna
–1955	HFC Haarlem		
1955–1963	NAC Breda		

International career
1955–1962	Netherlands	43	(0)
- * Club domestic league appearances and goals

Cornelis Johannes "Kees" Kuijs (4 October 1931 – March 2026) was a Dutch footballer who played as a left-back. He made 43 appearances for the Netherlands national team from 1955 to 1962. Kuijs died in March 2026, at the age of 94. At the time of his death he was the oldest surviving former international for the Netherlands national team.

== Career statistics ==
=== International ===
Appearances and goals by national team and year
National team	Year	Apps	Goals
Netherlands	1955	7	0
Netherlands	1956	6	0
Netherlands	1957	8	0
Netherlands	1958	6	0
Netherlands	1959	4	2
Netherlands	1960	8	0
Netherlands	1961	3	0
Netherlands	1962	1	0
Total		43	0
