= Luzhniki disaster =

1982 human crush in Luzhniki Stadium, Moscow

Coordinates: 55°42′57″N 37°33′13″E

- Date: 20 October 1982
- Location: Central Lenin Stadium, Moscow, Soviet Union
- Description: Crowd crush on stairway one of the east stand
- Deaths: 66 (disputed)
- Injured: 61

The Luzhniki disaster was a deadly crowd crush that took place at the Grand Sports Arena of the Central Lenin Stadium (Russian: Большая спортивная арена Центрального стадиона им. В. И. Ленина, now known as Luzhniki Stadium) in Moscow during the 1982–83 UEFA Cup match between FC Spartak Moscow and HFC Haarlem on 20 October 1982. According to the official enquiry, 66 FC Spartak Moscow fans, mostly adolescents, died in the crush, which made it Russia's worst sporting disaster. The number of fatalities in this crush was not officially revealed until seven years later, in 1989. Until then, this figure varied in press reports from 3 to 340 fatalities. The circumstances of this disaster are similar to those of the second Ibrox disaster in Scotland.

== Disaster ==
=== Match ===
20 October 1982 Second round	FC Spartak Moscow (Soviet Union)	2–0 Report	(Netherlands) HFC Haarlem	Moscow, USSR
19:00 MSD (UTC+04)	Fyodor Cherenkov; Rinat Dasayev; Yuri Gavrilov; 16' Edgar Gess; Boris Pozdnyakov; Sergey Rodionov; Oleg Romantsev; Sergey Shavlo; Vladimir Shcherbak; 90' Sergei Shvetsov; Vladimir Sochnov		Wim Balm; Joop Böckling; Martin Haar; Piet Keur (substituted off) 85'; Gerrie Kleton; Tommy Kristiansen (substituted on) 85'; Frank van Leen; Alwin Leysner; Keith Masefield; Edward Metgod; Luc Nijholt; Chris Verkaik	Stadium: Central Lenin Stadium; Attendance: 16,500; Referee: Edvard Sostarić (Yugoslavia)

On 20 October 1982, the weather in Moscow was snowy and extraordinarily cold for the middle of October, −10 °C (14 °F). There were 82,000 match tickets available, but because of the freezing weather conditions only about 16,500 tickets were sold.

The Grand Arena of Central Lenin Stadium (also called Olympic Stadium) did not have a roof over the seating at the time (it was installed in the 1997 improvements). In preparation for the match, the stadium management decided to open only two of the four stands for fans: the East Stand ("C") and the West Stand ("A"), to have enough time to clean snow from the stands before the game. Each stand had seating for 23,000 spectators. Most of the fans (about 12,000) went to the East Stand, which was closer to the Metro station. (Note: The proportion of the spectators between the two stands could be seen by comparing photos of the East Stand and the West Stand. Both photos were taken when the footballers were leaving the pitch after the game, i.e. approximately the time of the crush on Stairway 1 underneath the East Stand.) There were approximately 100 Dutch supporters; the vast majority of fans in attendance were fans of Spartak Moscow.

The match started at 7:00 pm. In the 16th minute, Spartak took the lead through an Edgar Gess strike. The rest of the game was largely uneventful. Minutes before the end of the game, several hundred fans began to leave the stadium in an attempt to get to the Metro station ahead of the crowds.

There are two covered stairways in the stadium under each stand, leading down to the exits. All of the exits at both stands were open. However, most of the fans from the East Stand rushed to Stairway 1, closer to the Metro station.

=== Crush ===
According to the witnesses who were interviewed during the investigation, one of the fans fell at the lower steps of Stairway 1. According to some reports, it was a young woman, who had lost her shoe on the stairs and stopped, trying to retrieve it and put it back on. A couple of people also stopped, trying to help the fan in need, but the moving dense crowd on the stairs, limited by metal banisters, crushed them down. People began to stumble over the bodies of those who were crushed in a crowd collapse.

More and more mostly teenage fans were joining the crowd on the stairs, trying to push their way down and unaware of the tragedy unfolding below, which caused a pile-up of people. The crush coincided with the second goal for Spartak, which was scored by Sergei Shvetsov twenty seconds before the final whistle.

The injured were taken by ambulances to the NV Sklifosovsky Scientific Research Institute of First Aid in Moscow. The next day Yuri Andropov (who replaced Leonid Brezhnev as leader of the country, less than a month after this disaster) visited the institute and met several doctors and relatives of the injured. The bodies of the dead were taken to the Moscow morgues for autopsy and identification. Later the bodies were returned to the victims' relatives for burial.

A total of 66 people died in this crush, 45 of whom were teenagers as young as 14, including five women. According to the post-mortem examinations, all of the fatalities died of compressive asphyxia. Another 61 people were injured, including 21 seriously. The Luzhniki Stadium tragedy was the Soviet Union's worst sporting disaster.

== Aftermath ==
=== Investigation ===
A thorough investigation of the Luzhniki disaster corresponded with the new policies of Yuri Andropov, a former KGB head, who became the leader of the country a month after the tragedy. He became known in the Soviet Union for his efforts to restore discipline at all levels of the society that had been loosened by the last years of Brezhnev's rule. On 17 December 1982, two months after the crush, he even went as far as firing the interior minister Nikolai Shchelokov, the Soviet Union's top police officer, after learning of the corruption allegations against him.

The criminal investigation of this disaster was launched by the Moscow Prosecutor's Office. Detective Aleksandr Shpeyer was appointed in charge of it. 150 witnesses were interviewed during the investigation. It produced 10 volumes of evidence, and took about three months to complete.

On 26 November, one month after the disaster, the first criminal charges were made against Stadium Director Victor Kokryshev and Stadium Manager Yuri Panchikhin. They were detained and placed in Butyrka prison.

=== Trial ===
Four officials were eventually charged in relation to this disaster: Stadium Director Victor Kokryshev, Stadium Manager Yuri Panchikhin, Stadium Deputy Director K. Lyzhin and the chief of the police guards at the East Stand, S. Koryagin.

The trial of the first two was held on 8 February 1983, three and a half months after the tragedy. Both were found guilty of negligence and both were sentenced to three years of imprisonment, the maximum penalty for a crime in the Soviet Criminal code. However, Kokryshev (as a person previously decorated by the state) was eligible for a recent amnesty (on the occasion of the 60th anniversary of the creation of the USSR) and was released. For Panchikhin, according to the same amnesty rules, the sentence was halved.

The other two officials, Deputy Director Lyzhin and police chief Major Koryagin, did not stand trial in February for medical reasons. Lyzhin, a World War II veteran, was admitted to the hospital after a heart attack. Koryagin was badly injured during his attempt to prevent more people from going into the crush. Later, both of them were given amnesty.

=== Memorial ===
In 1992, on the 10th anniversary of the disaster, and three years after the information about it was revealed to the public, a monument was erected near the site of the tragedy. On 20 October 2007, on the 25th anniversary, a memorial match was played at Luzhniki between the former players of FC Spartak Moscow and HFC Haarlem.

The Luzhniki disaster is sometimes compared with the second Ibrox disaster. Both of the crushes happened at the end of the match, when a fall on the stairs of one of the spectators caused a chain-reaction pile-up. There was also the same number of fatalities in both crushes – 66, many of whom were youths. Furthermore, both crushes coincided with a last-minute goal on the pitch.

The Luzhniki stadium has now been awarded the highest (4th) category status by UEFA. It hosted the 2008 UEFA Champions League final and the FIFA World Cup final in 2018.

Luzhniki stadium through the years
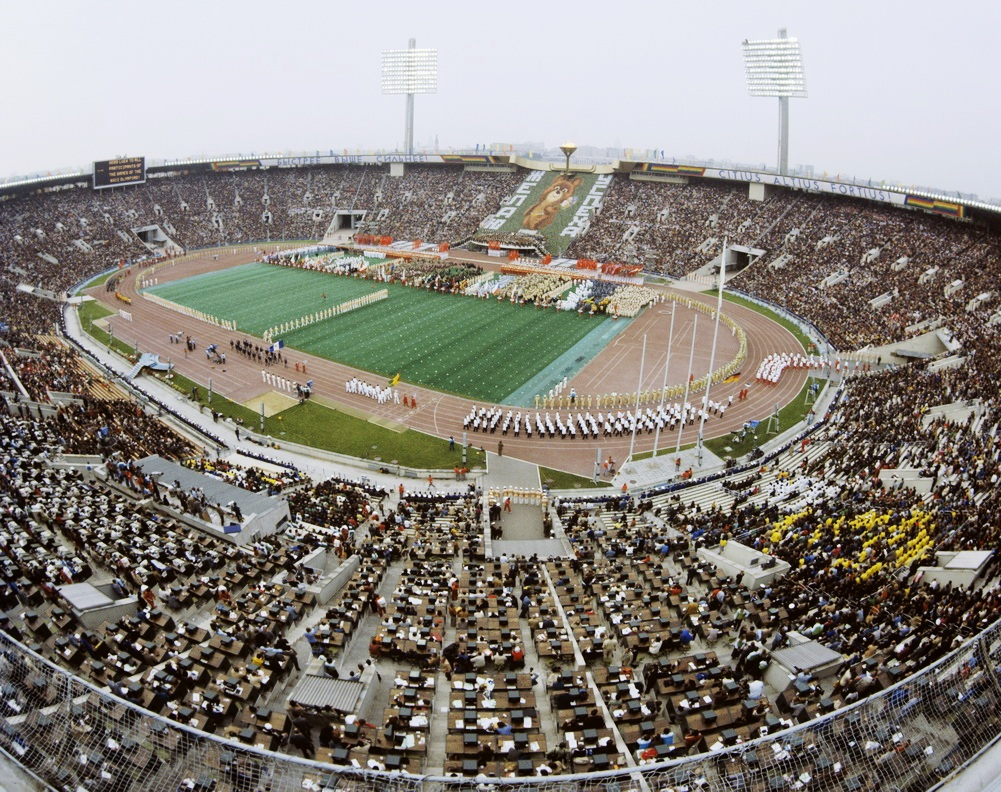
1980: No cover, as in the October 1982 match. The East Stand is straight ahead.

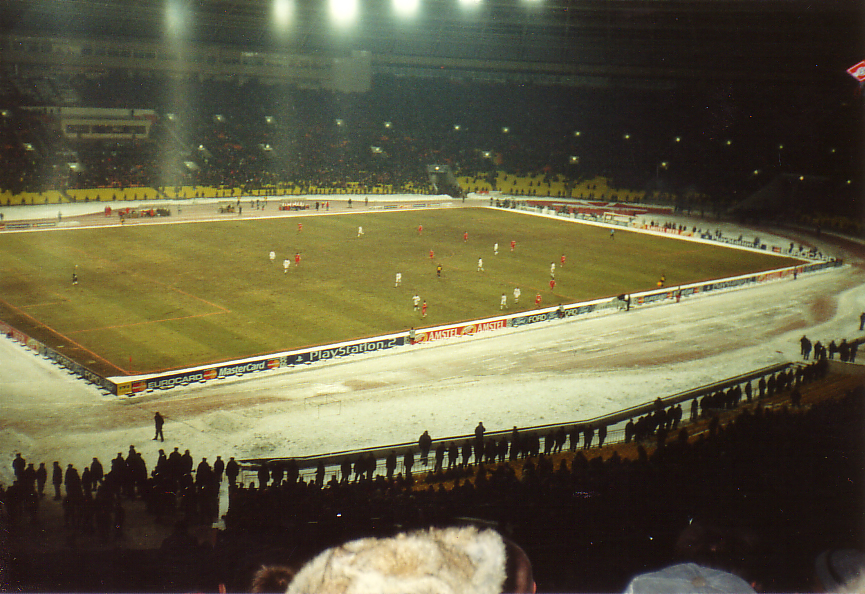
2001: A UEFA Champions League match in cold weather

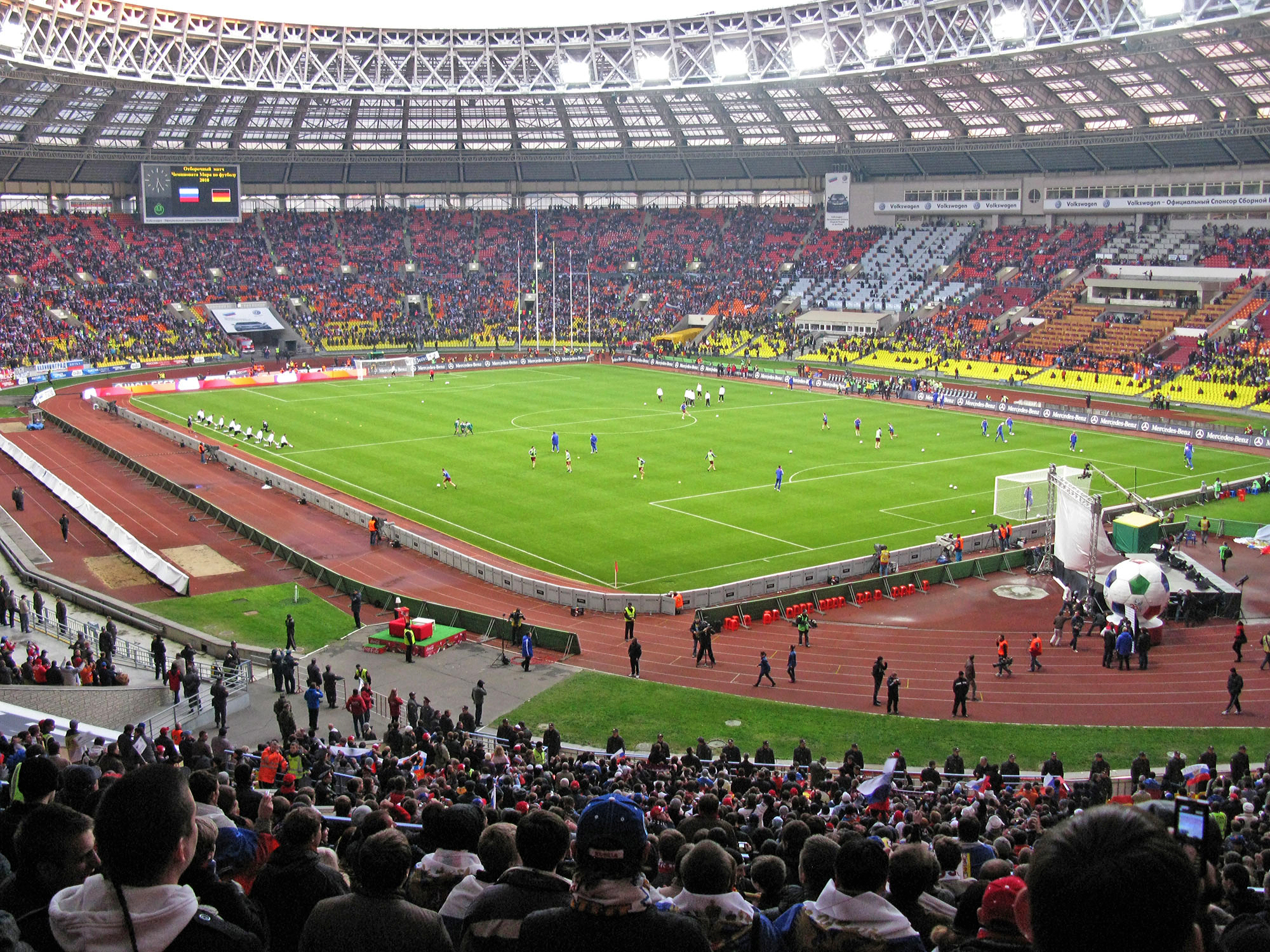
2009: Luzhniki with covered stands

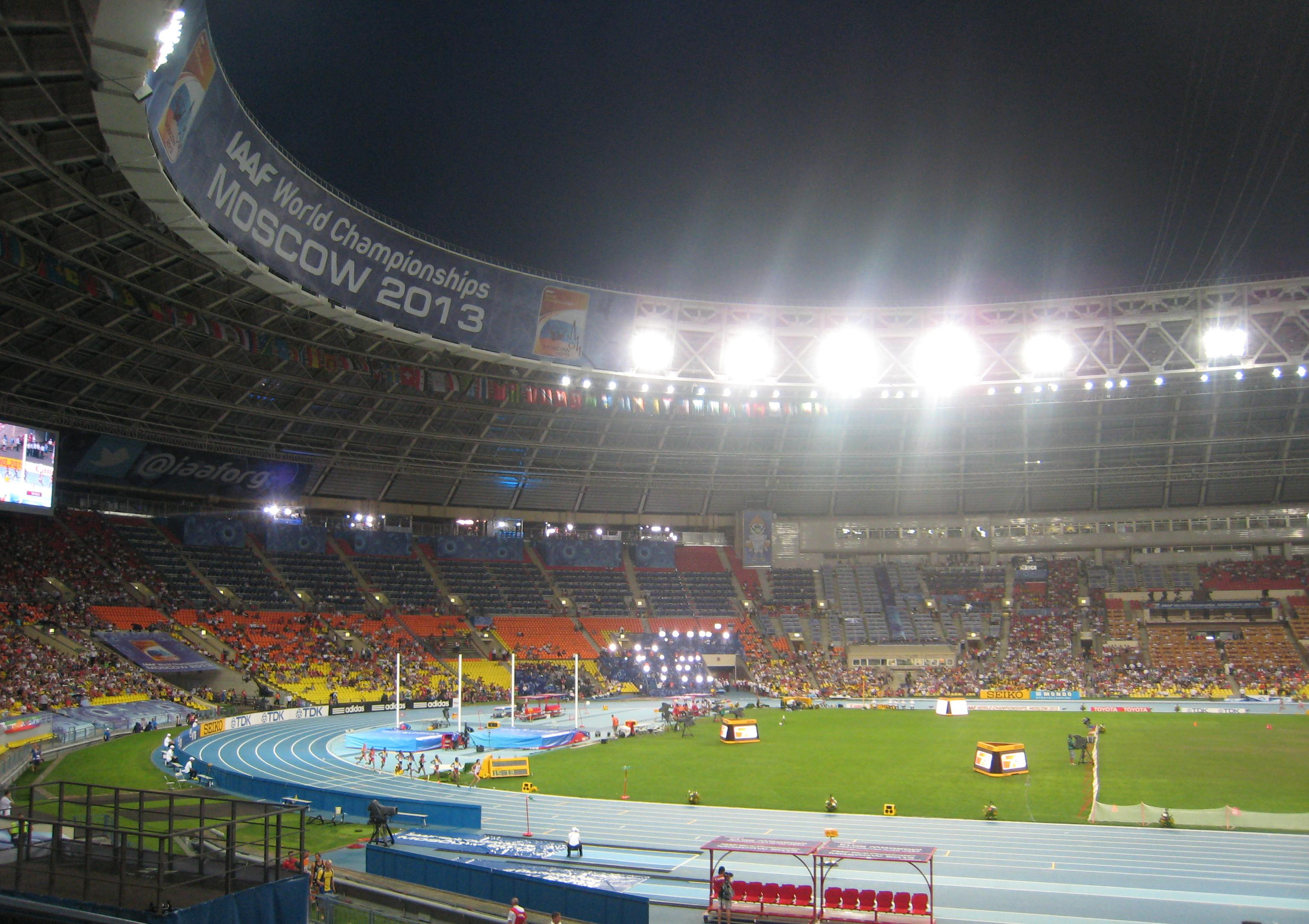
2013: Luzhniki with running tracks during the 2013 IAAF World Championships

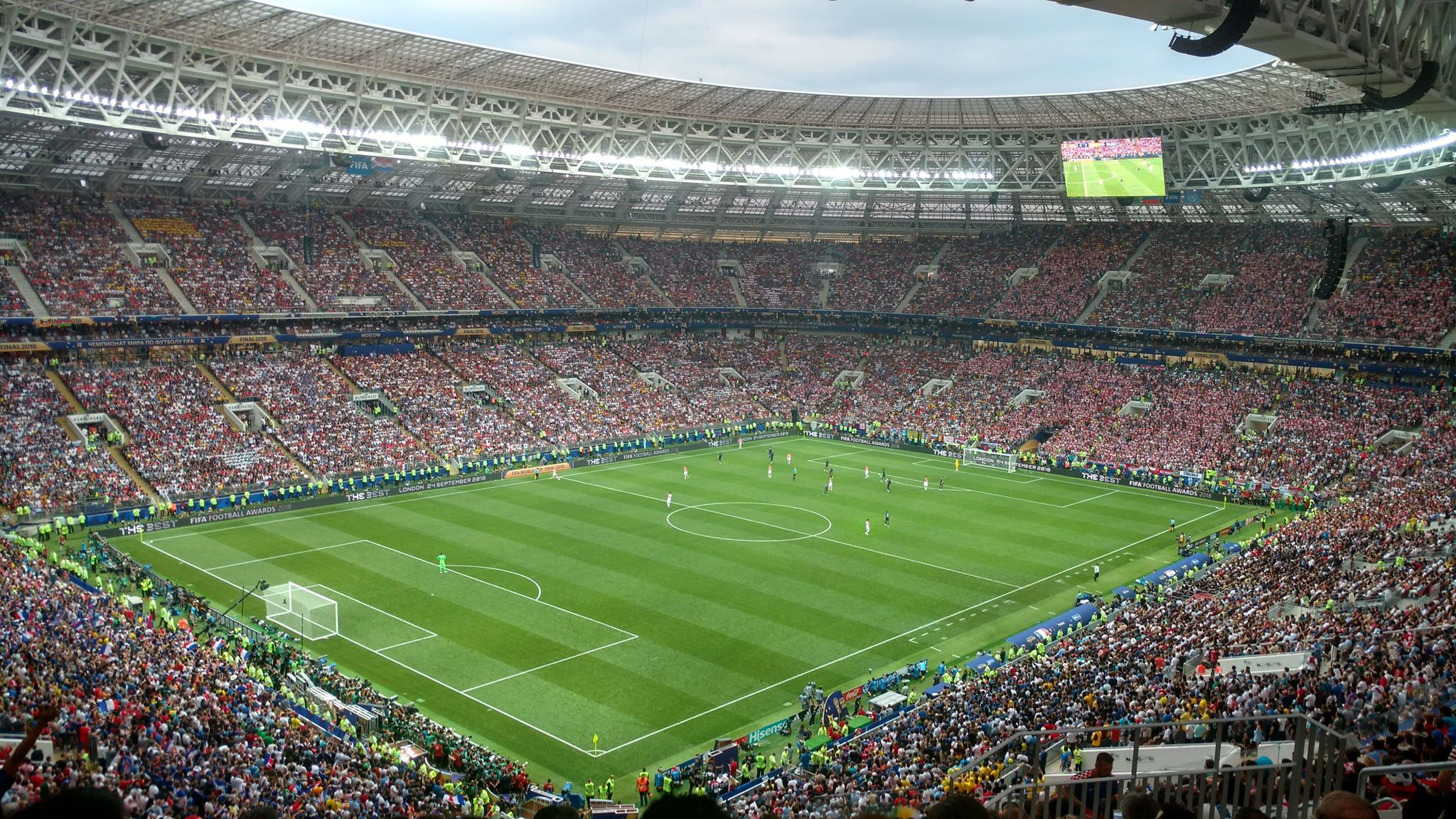
2018: Renovated Luzhniki with no running tracks during the 2018 FIFA World Cup Final

== Media coverage ==
=== Before 1989 ===
The only information about the tragedy in the Soviet media immediately after the disaster was a short note in a local daily, Vechernyaya Moskva, the next day. It said:

On 20 October 1982, after the football match at the Grand Sports Arena of the Central Lenin Stadium, as spectators were on their way out, an accident took place due to disturbances in the movement of people. There were casualties. An investigation into the circumstances of the accident is under way. (Note: The original text in Russian: "20 октября 1982 г. после футбольного матча на Большой спортивной арене Центрального стадиона имени В. И. Ленина при выходе зрителей в результате нарушения порядка движения людей произошел несчастный случай. Имеются пострадавшие. Проводится расследование обстоятельств происшедшего.")

On 21 and 24 October 1982, two Soviet national sports newspapers — the daily Sovetsky Sport and weekly Football-Hockey — published detailed accounts of this match, but neither mentioned the spectator tragedy that occurred.

The article in Vechernyaya Moskva did not go unnoticed by the West. It was reproduced by the Italian news agency ANSA. On 22 October, two days after the tragedy, La Stampa published a front-page article, where it revealed the information from the Soviet newspaper to its readers and speculated whether the word "casualties" should be understood as "injured" or "injured and killed". In this article La Stampa also said that the crush was probably caused by the fall of a woman, although La Stampa's source of that information is unclear, as this detail was not revealed by Vechernyaya Moskva.

On the next day, 23 October, Italian, Spanish and other Western newspapers stated that there were 3 people killed and 60 injured in this disaster, citing the Dutch journalists who were present at the match. They also mentioned, that, according to the Dutch journalists, both exits at the stand were open. According to El País, the information about 3 fatalities and 60 injured was distributed by the Dutch news agency ANP.

Three days later, on 26 October The New York Times wrote that "more than 20 persons were killed and dozens were injured in a panic at Lenin Stadium". Ten days later, in the article published on 5 November 1982, La Stampa stated that "it seems that 72" people were killed and "at least 150" were injured in the Luzhiniki disaster, citing the unnamed "unofficial sources". By 1987, El País had lowered its number of estimated fatalities to 68.

Until 1989, none of these figures were either confirmed or challenged by the Soviet officials. Soviet citizens were able to learn the details of this disaster only from the reports of the Voice of America and other Western shortwave-radio broadcasters.

=== 1989 ===
The first publications in the Soviet Union about the number of fatalities of the Luzhniki tragedy appeared only after the introduction of the Glasnost policy by Soviet leader Mikhail Gorbachev at the end of the 1980s.

==== 18 April ====
On 18 April 1989, seven years after the Luzhniki tragedy, Sovetsky Sport published a list of the football disasters in history, and mentioned the Luzhniki disaster among them. The journalists noticed that no information about the number of fatalities in Luzhniki had ever been revealed in the Soviet media and suggested that there were about 100 fatalities, without providing any reference.

The information from this article was immediately reproduced by Italian, French, Spanish and other international media outlets.

==== 8 July ====
Three months later, on 8 July 1989, Sovetsky Sport published another article, "Luzhniki's Dark Secret", which received even more publicity in the West. A pair of journalists admitted in the article that they were not familiar with the archived evidence from the criminal investigation and therefore they did not know even the number of fatalities. So, they loosely estimated it at 340 fatalities, citing the unnamed "parents of the children who died", but admitting that it is "an unverified figure". The journalists went further, accusing the police officers at the stadium of provoking this disaster and making some other allegations.

Though full of numerous factual mistakes and fabricated details, this article immediately became a sensation in the Western media. Reuters, Associated Press, Agence France-Presse, UPI, and other news agencies replicated the news about the "340 fatalities" of the "worst-ever sporting disaster in the history". By the end of next day, The New York Times, Los Angeles Times, The Washington Post, La Stampa, la Repubblica, Le Monde, die Tageszeitung, and other leading newspapers publicized this information all over the world.

==== 20 July ====
Two weeks later, on 20 July 1989, the Soviet newspaper of record Izvestia published an interview with a Detective Aleksandr Shpeyer, who was in charge of the 1982 investigation of the Luzhniki disaster. In this article, named "The Tragedy at Luzhniki: Facts and Fabrication", Detective Shpeyer provided various factual details of the disaster and revealed the real number of fatalities (66) and injured (61). When being asked, why this information was hidden from the public for so many years, Shpeyer replied that the Prosecutor's Office did not hide any information. The archives are open and any researcher could explore the evidence for themselves, after making an official, but simple request, the detective advised.

Unlike the "dark secret" article of Sovetsky Sport, the article in broadsheet Izvestia was hardly mentioned by the international media.

==== 21 July ====
The next day, Sovetsky Sport in its editorial admitted that its journalists, who wrote the sensational article two weeks earlier, had to use "conjectures" to provide details of this tragedy. At the same time, the editors expressed their satisfaction over the worldwide response evoked by their article.

In a special press conference in Moscow in August 1989, the Moscow Prosecutor's Office confirmed that there had been 66 fatalities in the Luzhniki disaster.

==== 27 September ====
On 27 September 1989, Sovetsky Sport finally admitted that information provided by their journalists "could not be confirmed" and that "emotions had prevailed over the facts". The author of this article, Vladimir Geskin, stated that "there were no reasons to doubt the results of the investigation", reported by Izvestia on 20 July.

=== Since 1989 ===
Despite its refutation in 1989, the figure of 340 fatalities or its variations ("more than 300", "closer to 350", "hundreds", etc.), is still often reproduced by some international media. Other details from the "dark secret" article in Sovetsky Sport (e.g., that only one stand and one exit were opened for spectators, or that there was a head-on collision of two fans' crowds moving in the opposite directions after the second goal) also sometimes resurface in modern publications.

In 2007 NTV aired its "Fatal Goal" (Роковой гол) documentary in Russia about the Luzhniki disaster. In 2008, ESPN Classic aired a Dutch documentary "Russian Night, the hidden football disaster" throughout Europe.

The only book about this disaster, Drama in het Lenin-stadion, was published in Dutch in the Netherlands in 2007.

On 6 June 2018, in the run-up to the 2018 FIFA World Cup, the British newspaper, The Daily Telegraph published an article that suggested that the true scale of the disaster has been covered up by the Russian state and that the death toll was considerably higher than the official figure of 66. The article suggests that the tragedy was caused by police attempting to arrest Spartak fans who were singing "subversive" songs against the communist regime.

== List of dead ==
№	Name	Age
1	Abdulaev Eldar	15
2	Abdulin Anver	29
3	Anykin Volod'a	14
4	Bagaev Sergei	14
5	Baranov Igor'	17
6	Bezhencova Victoria	17
7	Berezan' Alexander	15
8	Bakutenkova Nadezhda	15
9	Borisov Oleg	16
10	Budanov Mikhail	17
11	Volkow Dmitriy	16
12	Viktorow Oleg	17
13	Voronow Nikolas	19
14	Golubev Vladimir	33
15	Grishakov Alexander	15
16	Derug'in Igor'	17
17	Evseew Anatoli	16
18	Egorow Vladimir	16
19	Ermakov Anatoli	43
20	Zhidecki Vladimir	45
21	Zavert'aev Vladimir	23
22	Zaev Alexey	17
23	Zarembow Vladimir	28
24	Zisman Evgeni	16
25	Zozulenk V'acheslav	18
26	Kalaydjan Wartan	?
27	Kalinin Nikolas	?
28	Karpasov Maxim	17
29	Kerbs Egbert	23
30	Kisel'ev Vladimir	40
31	Klimenko Alexander	18
32	Koroleva Elena	16
33	Kostylev Alexey	18
34	Kusticov Vladislav	16
35	Kucev Nikolas	27
36	Larryonov Uriy	19
37	Lebedev Sergei	16
38	Lisaev Vladimir	24
39	Lichkun Nikolas	30
40	Lusanova Svetlana	15
41	Martynov Alexander	22
42	Mil'kov Alexey	17
43	Mosichkin Oleg	17
44	Muratov Alexander	39
45	Novostruev Michael	15
46	Panes Michael	37
47	Polityko Sergei	14
48	Popkov Alexander	15
49	P'atnicyn Nikolas	23
50	Radionow Konstantin	16
51	Rodin Sergei	16
52	Samowarova Elena	15
53	Sergonecew Valerie	19
54	Scotnikov Stanislav	16
55	Sudarkina Zinaida	37
56	Tamam'an Lebon	19
57	Uvarov Michael	14
58	Osmanow Dmitriy	17
59	Usov Sergei	17
60	Fedin Konstantin	16
61	Funtikov Vladimir	24
62	Hlewchuk Igor'	18
63	Chebotarev Oleg	20
64	Chernyshow Viktor	42
65	Shabanow Igor'	19
66	Shagin Igor'	19

Source: “Мемориал памяти погибших” (Memorial to the victims) and “Офицальный список жертв матча ‘Спартак’—‘Хаарлем’” (Official list of victims of the Spartak—Haarlem match).

== See also ==
- Second Ibrox disaster – in Glasgow, Scotland, on 2 January 1971.
