= Wim Roosen =

Dutch footballer (1918–1986)

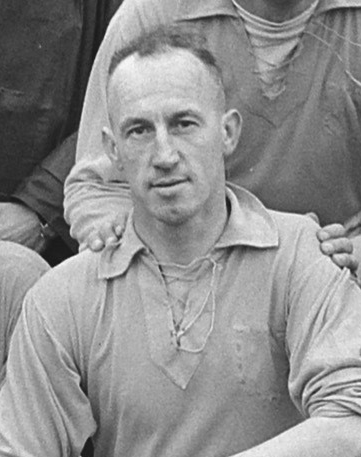
- Roosen in 1956

Personal information
- Full name: Wilhelmus Gerardus Johannes Roosen
- Date of birth: 31 July 1918
- Place of birth: Haarlem, Netherlands
- Date of death: 19 November 1986 (aged 68)
- Position: Forward

Senior career*
Years	Team	Apps	(Gls)
- HFC Haarlem

International career
1946–1947	Netherlands	6	(1)
- * Club domestic league appearances and goals

Wilhelmus Gerardus Johannes "Wim" Roosen (31 July 1918 – 19 November 1986) was a Dutch footballer who played as a forward for HFC Haarlem. He made six appearances for the Netherlands national team from 1946 to 1947. He scored one goal with a header, in a match against Belgium in Antwerp.

Roosen is the great-grandfather of Sven Roosen, the Dutch athlete who achieved a national record at his Olympic debut, during the 2024 Olympic Decathlon in Paris.
