= Sergei Shvetsov =

Soviet footballer

Personal information
- Full name: Sergei Aleksandrovich Shvetsov
- Date of birth: 7 December 1960 (age 65)
- Place of birth: Kutaisi, Georgian SSR
- Height: 1.89 m (6 ft 2 in)
- Position: Defender

Senior career*
| Years | Team | Apps | (Gls) |
| 1976–1977 | FC Torpedo Kutaisi | 17 | (3) |
| 1978–1980 | Zenit Leningrad | 34 | (6) |
| 1981–1984 | FC Spartak Moscow | 68 | (14) |
| 1985 | FC Torpedo Kutaisi | 23 | (1) |
| 1986 | Guria Lanchkhuti | 40 | (1) |
| 1987 | Lokomotiv Samtredia | 26 | (6) |
| 1990 | FC Baltika Kaliningrad | | |
| 1991–1992 | K.S.V. Bornem (Belgium) | | |

International career
| 1980 | USSR | 1 | (0) |
- * Club domestic league appearances and goals

Sergei Aleksandrovich Shvetsov (Russian: Серге́й Александрович Швецов) (born 7 December 1960 in Kutaisi) is a retired Soviet football player. He is probably most known for the goal he scored in the UEFA Cup game between FC Spartak Moscow and HFC Haarlem, which finished with the Luzhniki disaster.

== International career ==
Shvetsov played his only game for USSR on 4 December 1980 in a friendly against Argentina.
