= Gerrie Kleton =

Dutch footballer (1953–2006)

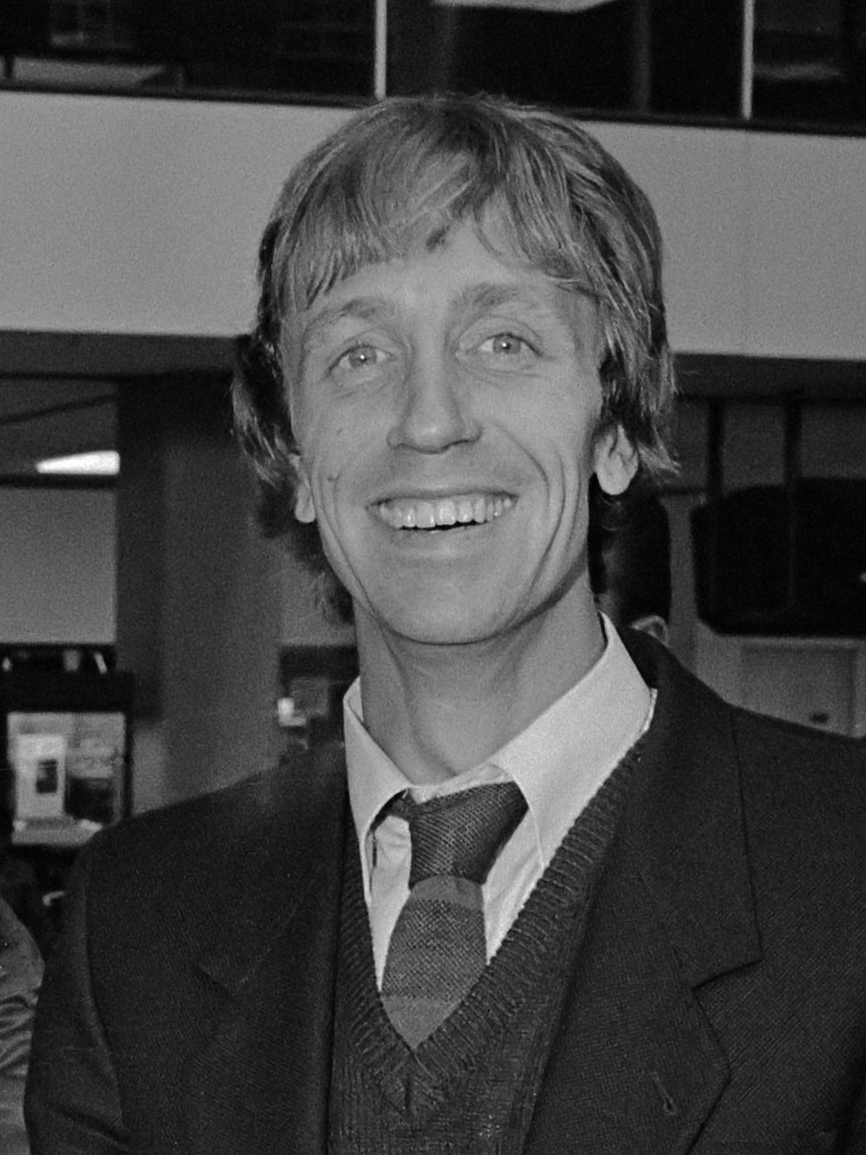
- Kleton in 1982

Personal information
- Full name: Gerrit Kleton
- Date of birth: 15 September 1953
- Place of birth: Amsterdam, Netherlands
- Date of death: 9 January 2006 (aged 52)
- Place of death: Amstelveen, Netherlands
- Position: Midfielder

Senior career*
Years	Team	Apps	(Gls)
1972–1974	Ajax	4	(0)
1974–1975	MVV	20	(2)
1975–1976	Haarlem	35	(18)
1976–1978	Cercle Brugge	63	(22)
1978–1979	Beerschot	22	(2)
1979–1985	Haarlem	164	(24)
1985–1986	AZ'67	26	(0)
1986–1988	RKC	61	(0)
Total		395	(68)

International career
1969	Netherlands U16	2	(0)
1970–1972	Netherlands U19	11	(2)
- * Club domestic league appearances and goals

Gerrie Kleton (15 September 1953 – 9 January 2006) was a Dutch professional footballer who played as a midfielder for Ajax, AZ Alkmaar, HFC Haarlem, RKC Waalwijk and Cercle Brugge. He was a member of the Haarlem team, that competed in the UEFA Cup in the 1982–83 season, for the first time in the club's history. However this campaign was to be overshadowed by the Luzhniki disaster.

== Death ==
Kleton died in January 2006 after a long illness. He was 52 years old and survived by his wife and two daughters.
