= Peet Stol =

Dutch footballer

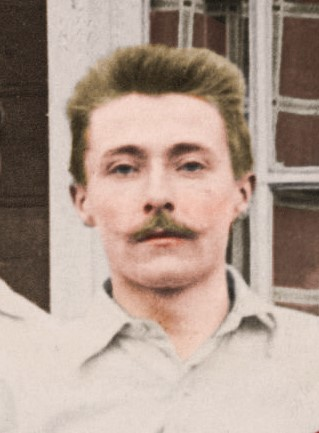
- Stol in 1905

Personal information
- Full name: Petrus Cornelis Stol
- Date of birth: 26 January 1880
- Place of birth: Haarlem, Netherlands
- Date of death: 27 November 1956 (aged 76)
- Position: Defender

Senior career*
| Years | Team | Apps | (Gls) |
- Haarlemsche FC

International career
| 1905 | Netherlands | 2 | (0) |
- * Club domestic league appearances and goals

Petrus Cornelis Stol (26 January 1880 – 27 November 1956), known as Peet Stol, was a Dutch footballer who played in the Netherlands' first ever international match on 30 April 1905, scoring an own goal. Stol, who spent his entire career playing with Haarlemsche FC, made a total of two appearances for the national team in 1905.
