= Henri Baaij =

Dutch footballer (1900–1943)

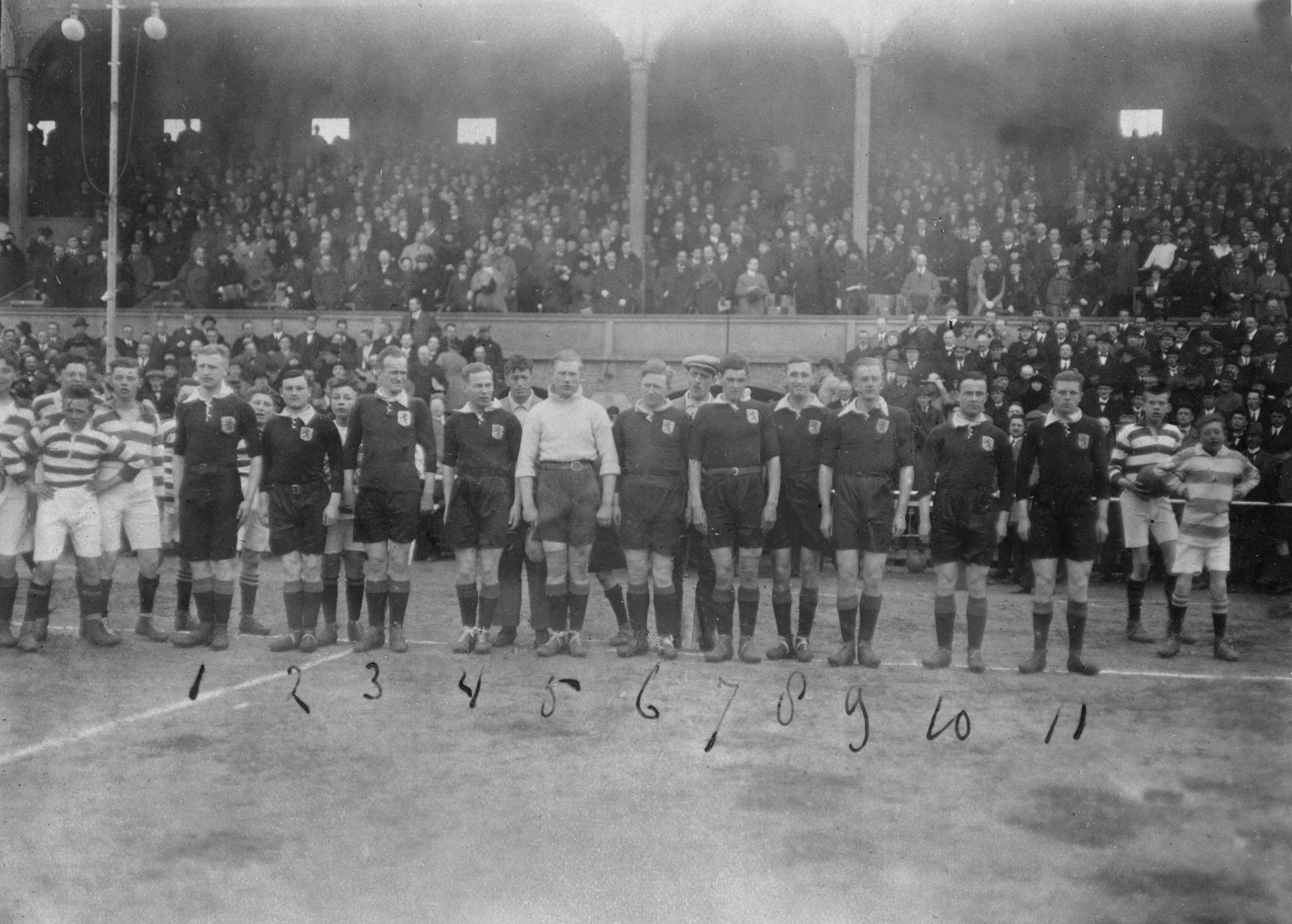
- Netherlands-Switzerland 28 March 1921, Baaij (1)

Personal information
- Full name: Hendrik Bernardus Baaij
- Date of birth: 19 September 1900
- Place of birth: Amsterdam, Netherlands
- Date of death: 26 March 1954 (aged 56)
- Place of death: Amsterdam, Netherlands
- Position: Defender

Senior career*
Years	Team	Apps	(Gls)
1920–1923	Haarlem	23	(2)

International career
1921	Netherlands	2	(0)
- * Club domestic league appearances and goals

Henri Baaij (25 November 1897 – 26 March 1954) was a Dutch footballer who played for HFC Haarlem. He was part of the Netherlands national team, playing two matches in 1921.

The KNVB (Dutch FA) website states that infantry soldier in the Royal Netherlands East Indies Army Baaij died on 31 May 1943, while working on the Burma Railway as a Japanese prisoner.
