= Edward Metgod =

Dutch footballer and coach

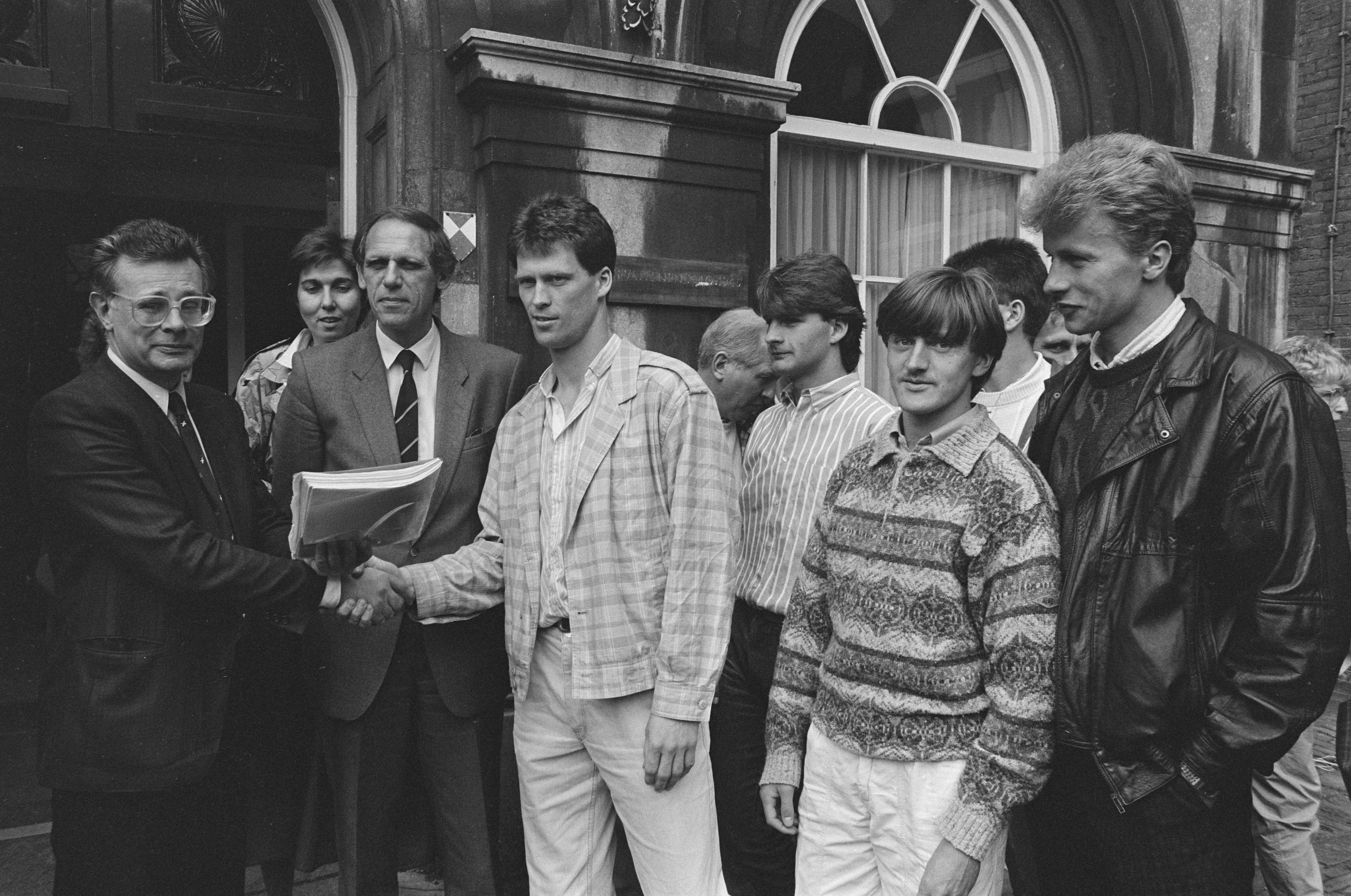

Personal information
- Date of birth: 19 December 1959 (age 66)
- Place of birth: Amsterdam, Netherlands
- Position: Goalkeeper

Senior career*
Years	Team	Apps	(Gls)
1979–1990	HFC Haarlem	329	(0)
1990–1997	Sparta Rotterdam	224	(0)

International career
1982	Netherlands	1	(0)

Managerial career
- 2008–2010: Telstar
- 2008–2010: Team VVCS
- * Club domestic league appearances and goals

Edward Metgod (born 19 December 1959) is a Dutch former professional footballer who played as a goalkeeper.

== Career ==
Metgod made his debut in Dutch professional football on 13 April 1980 for HFC Haarlem in a competition game against Roda JC losing 2–1. He spent 11 years at Haarlem before finishing his playing career with seven seasons at Sparta Rotterdam. Metgod was a member of the famous Haarlem team, that competed in the UEFA Cup in the 1982–83 season, for the first time in the club's history. However, this campaign was to be overshadowed by the Luzhniki disaster.

He earned one cap for the Netherlands national team during his career: on 10 November 1982 against France in a 2–1 loss.

Metgod managed a number of amateur clubs before becoming assistant manager of AZ Alkmaar in 2002. He went on to manage Telstar in the Dutch Eerste Divisie from 2008 to 2010 before moving to Team VVCS.

== Personal life ==
Metgod is the younger brother of John Metgod.
