= Wiggert van Daalen =

Dutch footballer (1895–1968)

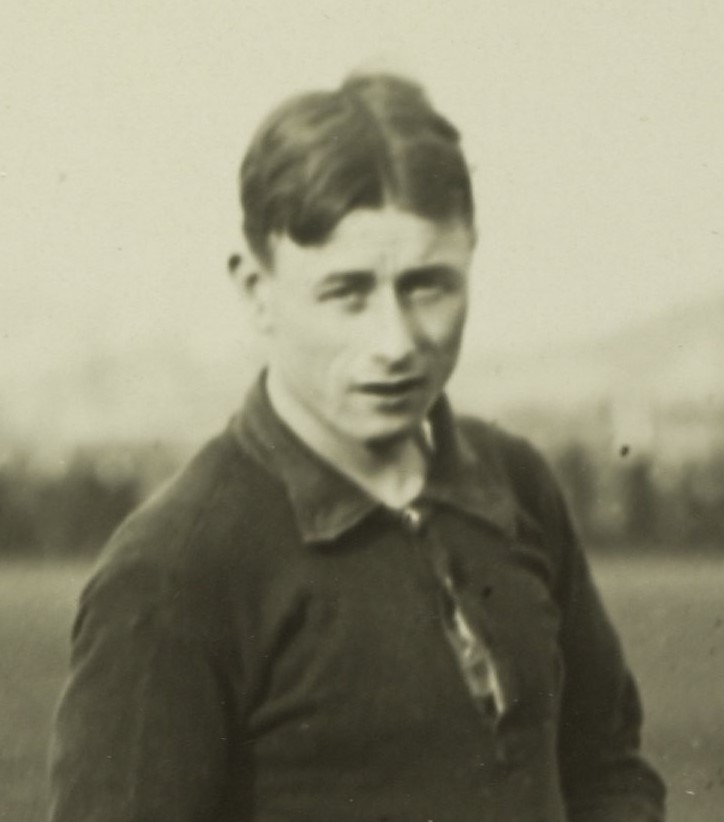
- Van Daalen in 1921

Personal information
- Full name: Wiggert Antoon van Daalen
- Date of birth: 22 February 1895
- Place of birth: Haarlem, Netherlands
- Date of death: 27 November 1968 (aged 73)
- Place of death: Haarlem, Netherlands
- Height: 1.73 m (5 ft 8 in)
- Position: Midfielder

Senior career*
Years	Team	Apps	(Gls)
	Haarlem	216	

International career
1925	Netherlands	1	(0)

Managerial career
- 1940–1942: Haarlem
- 1945–1948: Haarlem
- * Club domestic league appearances and goals

Wiggert Antoon van Daalen (22 February 1895 – 27 November 1968) was a Dutch footballer who played as a midfielder. He is best known for his long career with Haarlem, for which he made a total of 216 appearances. In recognition of his service to the club, he was made an Honorary Member (Lid van verdienst) in 1939. He also made one appearance for the Netherlands national team in a friendly match.

He was the father of Wiggert van Daalen Jr., who also became a footballer.

== Personal life ==
Wiggert Antoon van Daalen was born in February 1895 in Haarlem. His father, David Hendrik van Daalen, was also from Haarlem, and his mother, Maria Johanna Elisa van Sarlos, was born in Den Helder. He had five siblings, two sisters and three brothers.

At the age of 22, he married Grietje Appelman, a 22-year-old woman from Hoorn. Their marriage was registered on 2 January 1918 in Haarlem. In March of the same year, they had a son, Wiggert van Daalen Jr., who also played for Haarlem and became a national champion with the club in 1946.

At the time of his marriage, van Daalen worked as a typesetter in a printing house, and by 1943 he was a member of the Haarlem fire brigade.

He died on 27 November 1968 at the age of 73 in Haarlem.
