= Rob Compas =

Dutch racing cyclist

Personal information
- Born: 10 November 1966 (age 59) Venhuizen, North Holland, Netherlands

Cycling career
- Sport: Cycling

Rob Compas (born 10 November 1966) is a retired road bicycle racer from the Netherlands, who won the Dutch title for amateurs (road race) in 1992, defeating Erik Dekker (second) and Bart Voskamp (third). He represented his native country at the 1992 Summer Olympics in Barcelona, Spain, where he finished in 42nd position.

== See also ==
- List of Dutch Olympic cyclists
