= Kick Smit =

Dutch footballer (1911–1974)

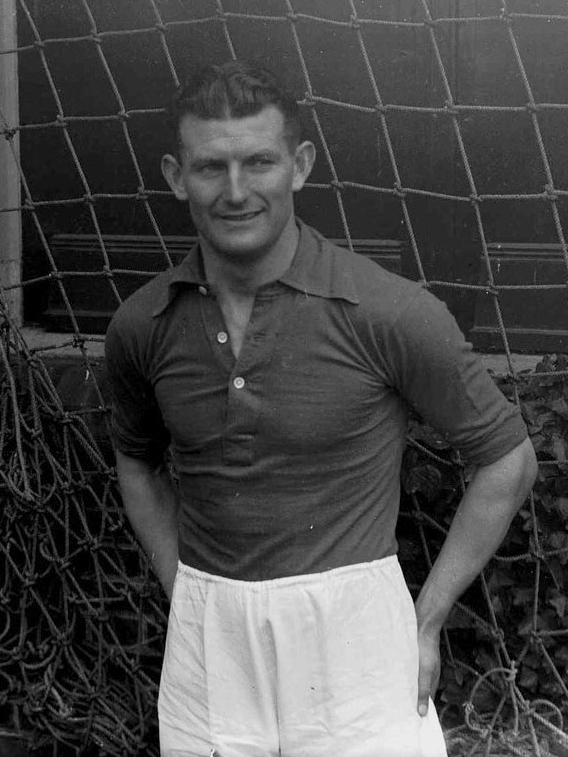
- Smit in 1946

Personal information
- Full name: Johannes Chrishostomus Smit
- Date of birth: 3 November 1911
- Place of birth: Bloemendaal, Netherlands
- Date of death: 1 July 1974 (aged 62)
- Place of death: Haarlem, Netherlands
- Position: Striker

Senior career*
Years	Team	Apps	(Gls)
1928–1949	HFC Haarlem	387	(139)

International career
1934–1946	Netherlands	29	(26)

Managerial career
- 1950–1956: HFC Haarlem
- 1956–1958: AZ '54
- 1965–1966: HFC Haarlem
- * Club domestic league appearances and goals

Johannes Chrishostomus "Kick" Smit (3 November 1911 – 1 July 1974) was a Dutch footballer who played as a striker. He earned 29 caps and scored 26 goals for the Netherlands national team, and played in the 1934 and 1938 World Cups. He is the first Netherlands football player who scored a goal in a World Cup (27 May 1934 against Switzerland). During his club career, he played for HFC Haarlem.
