= Haarlem-Kennemerland FC =

Dutch football club

- Full name: Haarlem-Kennemerland Football Club
- Founded: 1 January 1921 as Wilhelmina; 26 April 2010 as Haarlem-Kennemerland
- Ground: Haarlem Stadion; Haarlem
- Capacity: 3,442
- Chairman: Henk Jansma
- Manager: René van Marsbergen
- League: Vierde Klasse (Saturday B, West 1)
- Website: https://www.haarlem-kennemerland.nl/
Home colours

Haarlem-Kennemerland FC is a Dutch football club from the city of Haarlem, established in 2010 when a new club that had bought the naming rights of the bankrupt HFC Haarlem merged into the Tweede Klasse-side HFC Kennemerland. HFC Kennemerland was founded in 1921 as Wilhelmina.

== History ==
=== 1921–2010: HFC Kennemerland ===
The club was founded on 1 January 1921 under the name Wilhelmina. Because this name was already used by another club, the club changed its name to HFC Kennemerland in December 1921. The club grew quickly and because the club played on Saturdays, unusual in the region, the Haarlemsche Voetbalbond needed to start in the 1921–22 season a Saturday competition.

In 1941 a baseball division was added. In 1947 the club won a section championship in the Vierde Klasse of the KNVB. In 1949, the finale of the KNVB cup for amateurs was won and lost to IJmuiden. In 1950 the club was promoted to the Derde Klasse.

On May 31, 1988 HFC Kennemerland played a practice match against the Dutch national football team that was preparing for the 1988 European Championship, which it would win. The Dutch team won 13-2 against Kennemerland.

When the club decided to merge in 2010 with the new HFC Haarlem, the first squad of Kennemerland played in the Saturday Tweede klasse.

=== 2010: Merger with HFC Haarlem ===
On January 25, 2010, HFC Haarlem was declared bankrupt and was thus according to Dutch league rules excluded from the 2009–10 Eerste Divisie.

In February 2010, HFC Haarlem was reborn as an amateur club that acquired the naming and logo rights of the old team. The club began talks for a potential merger with HFC Kennemerland from the Tweede Klasse. It was announced that the merger was completed on April 27. the new club was named Haarlem-Kennemerland FC, and would play home games at Haarlem Stadion, thus aiming to continue some of the legacy of the old HFC Haarlem on the license of HFC Kennemerland.

=== Since 2010: Haarlem-Kennemerland ===
in 2010–2011, Haarlem-Kennemerland FC continued to play in the Tweede Klasse on the HFC Kennemerland license. It relegated to the Derde Klasse to return in 2012 to the Tweede Klasse. Also not for long, as Haarlem-Kennemerland was relegated again in 2013, this time to follow by a second relegation to the Vierde Klasse in 2014. Since 2014, Haarlem-Kennemerland is a constant staple in the Vierde Klasse.
