= Roy Wesseling =

Dutch footballer and manager

Personal information
- Date of birth: 24 October 1964 (age 62)
- Place of birth: Haarlem, Netherlands

Managerial career
- Years: Team
- 1995–1996: HFC Haarlem U21
- 1996–1997: SC Telstar
- 1997–2000: ADO '20
- 2000–2003: SV Huizen
- 2003–2005: HFC Haarlem
- 2005–2007: SC Cambuur
- 2007: FC Utrecht U21
- 2008–2009: IJsselmeervogels
- 2010–?: Ajax (scout)

Roy Wesseling (born 25 October 1964 in Haarlem) is a Dutch football manager. He has worked as a scout for Ajax.
