= HFC Haarlem =

Association football club in the Netherlands

- Full name: Haarlemsche Football Club Haarlem
- Nickname: Roodbroeken (Red Shorts)
- Founded: 1 October 1889; 136 years ago
- Dissolved: 25 January 2010; 16 years ago
- Ground: Haarlem Stadion, Haarlem, Netherlands
- Capacity: 3,442
- Coordinates: 52°24′37″N 4°38′56″E
Home colours	Away colours

HFC Haarlem was a Dutch football club from the city of Haarlem, established in 1889 and dissolved in 2010. The club won the Eredivisie in 1946 and reached five Cup finals, winning in 1902 and 1912. Haarlem reached the second round of the 1982–83 UEFA Cup, losing to Spartak Moscow of the Soviet Union.

Haarlem was declared bankrupt on 25 January 2010, and excluded from professional football with immediate effect. Haarlem played its last professional match on 22 January 2010, a 3–0 away loss to Excelsior.

In April 2010, three months after its exclusion from professional football, a new HFC Haarlem merged into Tweede Klasse club HFC Kennemerland, the new club being named Haarlem-Kennemerland FC. The team played in Tweede Klasse A Saturday Division, West District I in its debut season and has since relegated two tiers.

== History ==
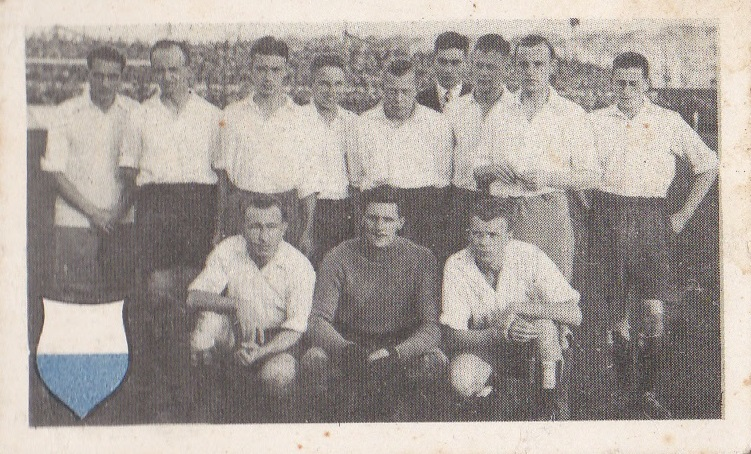
HFC Haarlem squad 1931-32 (Reydon, van Riemsdijk, de Ruyter, Lamp, Hagenaar, P. Jongeneel, v.d. Lee, R. Jongeneel, Wamsteker, van Baasbank, v.d. Meulen)

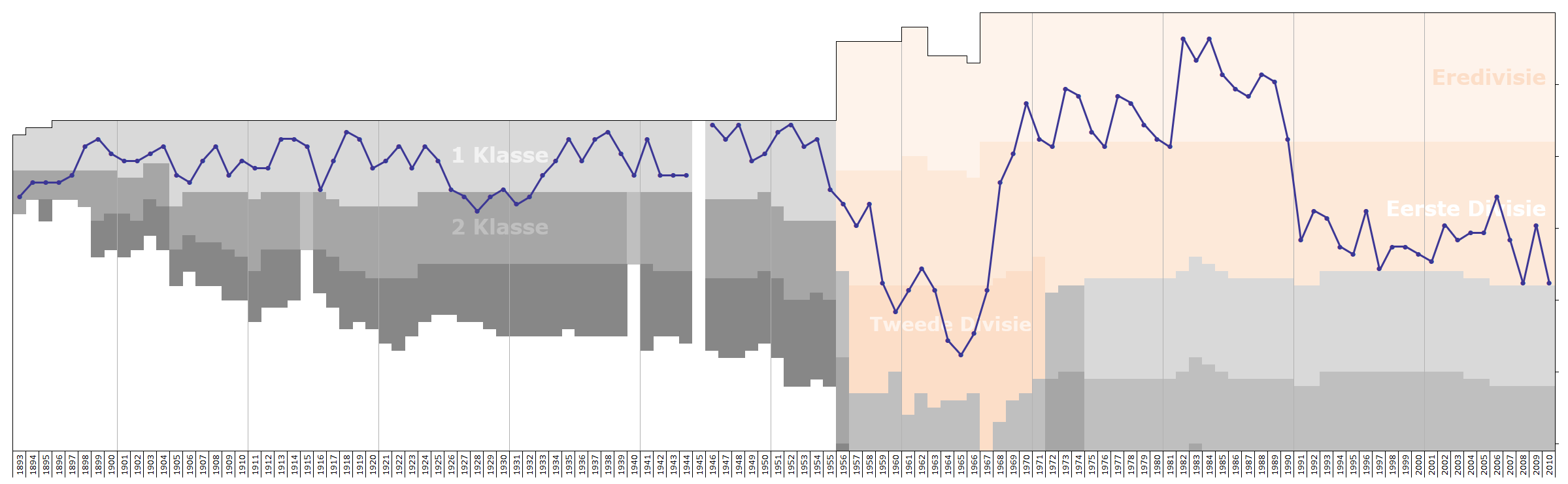
Historical chart of league performance

The club was founded on 1 October 1889. Haarlem won the Dutch national title in 1946 and reached five Dutch cup finals, winning in 1902 and 1912 and losing in 1911, 1914 and 1950. Haarlem won the title in the Eerste Divisie in 1972, 1976 and 1981. In 1982, HFC Haarlem, featuring a young Ruud Gullit, qualified for UEFA Cup football, in which they were eliminated by Spartak Moscow in the second round (the match hosted by Spartak is known in Russia because of the Luzhniki disaster that occurred in the stadium after the game). In 1990, Haarlem was relegated to the Eerste Divisie again, in which they played until 25 January 2010.

=== Ajax partnership ===
On 10 August 2009, Haarlem and AFC Ajax announced a partnership. Ajax would loan one to four players to Haarlem every season, it also meant Ajax would get a say in Haarlem-transfers, and would deploy employees to Haarlem, Cock Jol, brother of Martin Jol supervised the Ajax-Haarlem project.

=== Bankruptcy ===
On 25 January 2010 Haarlem was declared bankrupt and was, according to Dutch league rules, excluded from competition, with all its previous results in the ongoing competition expunged. The club ceased to exist, with all its players (and staff) becoming free agents.

In February 2010, HFC Haarlem was reinstated as a new amateur club, who also took the naming and logo rights from the old version. This club then started talks for a potential merger with amateur Tweede Klasse Haarlem-based side HFC Kennemerland, which was announced to have been completed on 27 April; the new club would be called Haarlem-Kennemerland FC, and would play home games at Haarlem Stadion, thus continuing the legacy of the old HFC Haarlem.

== Honours ==
- Eredivisie
  - Winner: 1946
- KNVB Cup
  - Winner: 1902, 1912
  - Runners-up: 1911, 1914, 1950
- Eerste Divisie
  - Winner: 1972, 1976, 1981
- Tweede Divisie
  - Winner: 1961, 1963, 1967
- Promoted to Eredivisie
  - Promotion: 1969

== 1982–83 UEFA Cup ==
15 September 1982
First Round
First Leg

HFC Haarlem	2–1	AA Gent
Gerrie Kleton 37'; Martin Haar 73'		Kiyiaki Tokodi 78' (pen.)

Haarlem Stadion, Haarlem
Attendance: 11.800
Referee: Ib Nielsen (DEN)

29 September 1982
First Round
Second Leg

AA Gent	3–3	HFC Haarlem
Aad Koudijzer 23', 60'; Cees Schapendonk 29'		Joop Böckling 3'; Gerrie Kleton 67'; Piet Keur 90'

Jules Otten Stadion, Ghent
Attendance: 9.604
Referee: Osmo Orakangas (FIN)

20 October 1982
Second Round
First Leg

Spartak Moscow	2–0	HFC Haarlem
Edgar Gess 17'; Sergei Shvetsov 90'

Luzhniki Stadium, Moscow
Attendance: 15,000
Referee: Eduard Sostarić (YUG)

3 November 1982
Second Round
Second Leg

HFC Haarlem	1–3	Spartak Moscow
Piet Huyg 25'		Sergei Shvetsov 43'; Sergei Shavlo 55'; Yuri Gavrilov 85'

Haarlem Stadion, Haarlem
Attendance: 18,000
Referee: Viriato Graça Oliva (POR)

== Former players ==
=== National team players ===
The following players were called up to represent their national teams in international football and received caps during their tenure with HFC Haarlem:

- Armenia
  - (Armenia) Edgar Manucharyan (2009–2010)
  Denmark
  - (Denmark) Niels-Christian Holmstrøm (1970–1971)
- Netherlands
  - (Netherlands) Henri Baaij (1920–1923)
  - (Netherlands) Arie Bieshaar (1917–1934)
  - (Netherlands) Gerrit Bouwmeester (1908–1914)
  - (Netherlands) Klaas Breeuwer (1923–1925)
  - (Netherlands) Nico de Wolf (1910–1913)
  - (Netherlands) Piet Groeneveld (1950–1960)
  - (Netherlands) Ruud Gullit (1979–1982)
  - (Netherlands) Jur Haak (1911–1922)
  - (Netherlands) Martien Houtkooper (1910–1927)
- **Netherlands** (continued)
  - (Netherlands) Kees Kuijs (1951–1955)
  - (Netherlands) Edward Metgod (1979–1990)
  - (Netherlands) Arthur Numan (1987–1991)
  - (Netherlands) Joop Odenthal (1954–1957)
  - (Netherlands) Wim Roosen (1945–1956)
  - (Netherlands) Kick Smit (1928–1949)
  - (Netherlands) Peet Stol (189?–19??)
  - (Netherlands) Piet Tekelenburg (1913–1926)
  - (Netherlands) Wiggert van Daalen (1918–1943)

- Players in bold actively play for HFC Haarlem and for their respective national teams. Years in brackets indicate careerspan with HFC Haarlem.

== Players in international tournaments ==
The following is a list of HFC Haarlem players who have competed in international tournaments, including the FIFA World Cup. To this date no HFC Haarlem players have participated in the UEFA European Championship, Africa Cup of Nations, Copa América, AFC Asian Cup, CONCACAF Gold Cup or the OFC Nations Cup while playing for HFC Haarlem.

Cup	Players
(Italy) 1934 FIFA World Cup	(Netherlands) Kick Smit
(France) 1938 FIFA World Cup	(Netherlands) Kick Smit

== Player records ==
Most appearances (as of December 11, 2017)
#	Name	Career	Apps	Goals
1	(Netherlands) Beer Wentink	1963–78	524	
2	(Netherlands) Piet Groeneveld	1950s	408	
3	(Netherlands) Gerrit Peijs	1966–78	368	23
4	(Netherlands) Edward Metgod	1979–90	351	0
5	(Netherlands) Piet Huyg	1970–84	349	

== Historical list of coaches ==
This is the list of coaches of HFC Haarlem:

1. (Netherlands) Kick Smit (1951–1956)
2. (Netherlands) Wim Roosen (1956–1957)
3. (Netherlands) Ben Peeters (1957–1959)
4. (Netherlands) Karel Kaufman (1959–1962)
5. (Netherlands) Ruud van Wilsum (1962–1965)
6. (Netherlands) Kick Smit (1965–1966)
7. (Netherlands) Piet Peeman (1966–1967)
8. (Wales) Barry Hughes (1968–1970)
9. (Scotland) Bill Thompson (1970–1971)
10. (Netherlands) Joop Brand (1971–1973)
11. (Wales) Barry Hughes (1973–1980)
12. (Netherlands) Hans van Doorneveld (1980–1987)
13. (Netherlands) Dick Advocaat (1987–1989)
14. (Netherlands) Hans Eijkenbroek (1989–1990)
15. (Netherlands) Ted Immers (1990–1991)
16. (Netherlands) Hans van Doorneveld (1991–1994)
17. (Netherlands) Henny Lee (1994–1995)
18. (Netherlands) Ben Hendriks (1995–1997)
19. (Netherlands) Karel Bonsink (1997–2000)
20. (Netherlands) Heini Otto (2000–2002)
21. (Netherlands) Leo van Veen (2002–2003)
22. (Netherlands) Roy Wesseling (2003–2005)
23. (Netherlands) Gert Aandewiel (2005–2007)
24. (Netherlands) Jan Zoutman (2007–2009)
25. (Netherlands) Hennie Spijkerman (2009–2010)
